= 2026–27 United States network television schedule =

The 2026–27 network television schedule for the five major English-language commercial broadcast networks that air in the United States covers the prime time hours from September 2026 to August 2027. The schedule is followed by a list per network of returning series, new series, and series canceled after the 2025–26 television season.

CBS was the first to announce its initial fall schedule on April 15, 2026 via press release (without an upfront presentation), followed by NBC (with its upfront presentation at 10:30 a.m. Eastern time) on May 11, Fox (with its upfront presentation at 4 p.m.) also on May 11, and ABC on May 12 (with its upfront presentation at 4 p.m. that day).

The CW did not announce a schedule for fall 2026 via upfronts, instead opting to announce renewals and premiere dates throughout the summer.

Beginning this season, CBS permanently discontinued the Crimetime Saturday block and was permanently replaced by CBS Encores and other programming on select weeks (including sports).

PBS is not included here, as the member television stations have local flexibility over most of their schedule and broadcast times for network shows may vary.

Each of the 30 highest-rated shows releasing in June 2027 will be listed with its rank and rating as determined by Nielsen Media Research.

== Legend ==
- Light blue indicates local programming.
- Gray indicates encore programming, including repeats.
- Blue-gray indicates news programming.
- Light green indicates sporting events.
- Red indicates series being burned off and other irregularly scheduled programs, including specials and movies.
- Light gold indicates programming produced outside of the United States.
- Bronze indicates reruns of programming that originally aired on a cable channel or streaming service.
- Light yellow indicates the current schedule.

== Schedule ==
- New series to broadcast television are highlighted in **bold**.
- Repeat airings or same-day rebroadcasts are indicated by **(R)**.
- All times are U.S. Eastern and Pacific Time (except for some live sports or events). Subtract one hour for Central, Mountain, Alaska, and Hawaii–Aleutian times.
- All sporting events air live in all time zones in U.S. Eastern time, with local and/or late night programming scheduled by affiliates after game completion.
- Dates (e.g., (9/13)) indicate the first month and day of a program in its regular timeslot, and also the time slot premiere (the season premiere date can be used here if it's also the time slot premiere, otherwise include the season premiere as a separate note).
- During the NFL regular season and Wild Card Round (excluding games on broadcast networks, with ABC and/or Hearst affiliates having first refusal on games broadcast by ESPN (due to ABC being owned by the same company as ESPN, and Hearst owning 18% stake on ESPN)), the NFL policy on Monday Night Football games on ESPN, Thursday Night Football, NFL Network Exclusive Game Series and any game exclusively airing on Peacock, Netflix, and ESPN DTC will affect the 31 primary markets (30 markets with NFL teams and Milwaukee, WI). The NFL sells syndication rights to the cable and streaming-only games to local broadcasters in the home and away teams' primary markets to maximize ratings. Therefore, affiliates airing simulcasts of cable networks and streaming services in these areas during such games will have to either delay its primetime programming from its respective network's usual time slots or have it moved to another sister station to air live.
- During the NFL preseason, NBA, MLB and NHL preseason and regular season (plus first round NHL postseason games), some affiliates may not air their respective primetime programming due to their local NFL, NBA, MLB or NHL team games and may choose to put its network's programming on a sister channel to air live, delay the program to air later on the network or preempt the shows entirely.

=== Sunday ===
Network		7:00 p.m.	7:30 p.m.	8:00 p.m.	8:30 p.m.	9:00 p.m.	9:30 p.m.	10:00 p.m.	10:30 p.m.
ABC	Fall	America's Funniest Home Videos		The Wonderful World of Disney (Note: On select weeks when episodes of America's Funniest Home Videos: So Many Laughs, So Little Time or hour-long ABC encores air at 8 p.m., The Wonderful World of Disney will air at 8:30 p.m. or 9 p.m., depending on the gap between new AFV and the movie.) (Note: On select weeks when America's Funniest Home Videos cannot air new episodes at 7 p.m., The Wonderful World of Disney may be shifted to 7:30 p.m. with other ABC encores filling in the 7pm ET/PT half hour.)					
ABC	Spring	America's Funniest Home Videos		The Bachelor (3/21)				What Would You Do? (3/21)	
CBS	Fall	NFL on CBS (4:25 p.m.)	60 Minutes		Marshals		Tracker		**Cupertino** (R)
CBS	Winter	60 Minutes (1/17)		Marshals (1/17)		Tracker (1/17)		**Cupertino** (1/17)	
The CW		Police 24/7 (R)	The CW Sunday Night Movie (Note: On select weeks, The CW Sunday Night Movie airs 3 hours of movies at 7 p.m., thus no other programming will air in the 7 p.m. hour.)					Local programming	
Fox	Fall	Fox NFL (4:25 p.m.)	The OT	The Simpsons	Animal Control	Universal Basic Guys	Grimsburg	Local programming	
Fox	Winter	Animal Control (R) (1/17)	Universal Basic Guys (R) (1/17)	The Simpsons	Animal Control	Universal Basic Guys	Grimsburg	Local programming	
NBC	Fall	Football Night in America		NBC Sunday Night Football (8:20 p.m.)					
NBC	Winter	Basketball Night in America (6:30 p.m.) (1/24)	NBC Sunday Night Basketball (1/24)						
NBC	Spring	NBC Sunday Night Baseball (7:20 p.m.)						TBA	

Notes:

- On weeks when CBS airs an NFL singleheader (and in the time zones west of Central time on all weeks), its programming will be shifted a half hour earlier with local programming and/or CBS encores filling in the 7 or 10:30 pm ET/PT half hour in those time zones.
- On weeks when Fox airs an NFL singleheader, an additional hour of encore programming will air in the 7 p.m. ET/PT slot on the network.
- When Fox airs a late NFL singleheader game in the eastern and central time zones, its programming will be joined in progress if the game does overrun past its 7 p.m. ET/6 p.m. CT slot. If there is an overrun on CBS, 60 Minutes will air in its entirety delaying all subsequent programs unless the game runs beyond 8 p.m. ET/7 p.m. CT. Then, the show in the 10 p.m. ET/PT slot will be preempted and an encore of a different show will air in its place in all time zones west of central time. If Fox overruns its games past 8 p.m. ET/7 p.m. CT, The OT will be preempted on all affiliates and the show airing in the 8 p.m. ET/PT slot will air in its entirety and delaying all subsequent programs along with local programming airing in all time zones in the 7 p.m. PT/6 p.m. MT slot regardless of end time.
- On January 24 and 31, 2027, NBC will air single NBC Sunday Basketball games at 8:30 p.m. ET; other programming will air in the 7 p.m. ET hour (Basketball Night in America begins at 8 p.m. ET on those nights). On February 14, the network will not air any games due to the Super Bowl. On February 21, the 2027 NBA All-Star Game series will be played, with start time of the first game to be determined. On select other weeks, the network may opt to air a 7 and 9:30 p.m. ET game instead of a 7:30 and 10 p.m. ET game.
- CBS is scheduled to air the 84th Golden Globes on January 10, 2027 at 8 p.m.
- ABC is scheduled to air the 69th Annual Grammy Awards on February 7, 2027 at 7 p.m.
- ABC is scheduled to air Super Bowl LXI on February 14, 2027 at 6:30 p.m.
- ABC is scheduled to air the 99th Academy Awards on March 14, 2027 at 7 p.m.

=== Monday ===
Network		8:00 p.m.	8:30 p.m.	9:00 p.m.	9:30 p.m.	10:00 p.m.	10:30 p.m.
ABC	Fall	Monday Night Countdown (7:30 p.m.)	Monday Night Football (8:15 p.m.)				
ABC	Winter	American Idol (2/8)				Shark Tank (2/8)	
CBS	Fall	FBI		CIA		Harlan Coben's Final Twist	
CBS	Winter	Ghosts (1/25)	**Eternally Yours** (1/25)	FBI (1/25)		CIA (1/25)	
The CW	Fall	**Private Eyes West Coast**		Law & Order Toronto: Criminal Intent		Local programming	
The CW	Winter	Wild Cards (2/1)		Penn & Teller: Fool Us (R) (1/4)		Local programming	
Fox	Fall	Celebrity Name That Tune		Celebrity Weakest Link		Local programming	
Fox	Winter	Murder in a Small Town (2/1)		Memory of a Killer (2/1)		Local programming	
NBC	Fall	The Voice				**Line of Fire**	
NBC	Mid-fall	St. Denis Medical	The Fall and Rise of Reggie Dinkins	The Voice		**Line of Fire**	
NBC	Winter	St. Denis Medical	The Fall and Rise of Reggie Dinkins	**The Rockford Files** (R) (1/11)		**Line of Fire**	
NBC	Mid-winter	St. Denis Medical	**Sunset P.I.** (2/8)	The Voice (2/8)		**Line of Fire**	
NBC	Spring	NBA Monday					NBA Showtime

Notes:

- NBC is scheduled to air a two-hour season finale of The Voice on December 14, 2026 at 9 p.m.
- The CW is scheduled to air a special CW College Basketball game on December 21, 2026 at 8 p.m.
- NBC is scheduled to air a special NBA Monday game on December 28, 2026 at 8 and 10:30 p.m.

=== Tuesday ===
Network		8:00 p.m.	8:30 p.m.	9:00 p.m.	9:30 p.m.	10:00 p.m.	10:30 p.m.
ABC	Fall	Dancing with the Stars				R.J. Decker	
ABC	Mid-fall	Dancing with the Stars				Various programming	
ABC	Late fall	High Potential (R) (12/15)					
ABC	Winter	Will Trent (1/5)		High Potential (1/5)		**Surviving a Scandal** (1/5)	
CBS	Fall	NCIS		**NCIS: New York**		NCIS: Origins	
CBS	Winter	NCIS		**NCIS: New York**		NCIS: Sydney (1/26)	
The CW	Fall	WWE NXT*				Local programming	
The CW	Winter	WWE NXT*				CW College Basketball (1/12)	
The CW	Late winter	WWE NXT*				Local programming	
Fox	Fall	Best Medicine		Doc		Local programming	
Fox	Winter	**The Interrogator** (2/9)		Doc		Local programming	
NBC	Fall	The Voice				**The Traitors: New Blood** (R)	
NBC	Mid-fall	Coast 2 Coast Tuesday					NBA Showtime

Notes:

- Depending on their choice of feed, NBC stations have the option of airing NBA on NBC games at 8 p.m. ET/5 p.m. PT and/or 11 p.m. ET/8 p.m. PT, with the option of games starting a half or a whole hour earlier; some affiliates that opt to carry the late game may preempt their late local newscasts, rather than air them on a delayed basis, and instead air late night programming immediately following the game. On December 22 and 29, all NBC affiliates will air both games at 8 and 10:30 p.m. ET doubleheaders.
- On weeks when CW College Basketball airs in the 10 p.m. ET window, WWE NXT airs live or gets delayed to after the game for viewers in the Mountain and Pacific Time Zones, Central, Eastern, Alaska and Hawaii–Aleutian time zones are unaffected by this change and will continue to air the program at its normal time.
- ABC is scheduled to air the 2026 Rock and Roll Hall of Fame Induction Ceremony on December 8, 2026 at 8 p.m.
- The CW is scheduled to air a special CW College Basketball game on January 12, and February 2, 16, and 23, 2027 at 10 p.m.

=== Wednesday ===
Network		8:00 p.m.	8:30 p.m.	9:00 p.m.	9:30 p.m.	10:00 p.m.	10:30 p.m.
ABC	Fall	Scrubs	Abbott Elementary	Who Wants to Be a Millionaire		Shark Tank	
ABC	Mid-fall	Scrubs	Abbott Elementary	Various programming		Shark Tank	
ABC	Late fall	Scrubs	Abbott Elementary	Shifting Gears (R) (12/2)		Shark Tank	
ABC	Winter	Shifting Gears (1/13)	Abbott Elementary	The Rookie (1/6)		**The Rookie: North** (1/6)	
CBS	Fall	Survivor			The Amazing Race		
CBS	Winter	The Price Is Right at Night (1/6)		**Stacks of Cash** (1/6)		TBA	
CBS	Late winter	Survivor (2/24)				Undercover Boss (2/24)	
The CW	Fall	Police 24/7 (R)		**The Great American Road Rally**		Local programming	
The CW	Winter	**CW Courtside Wednesday** (12/9)				Local programming	
The CW	Late winter	Police 24/7 (3/10)		Police 24/7 (R) (3/10)		Local programming	
Fox	Fall	The Floor		99 to Beat		Local programming	
Fox	Winter	The Masked Singer (1/6)		**Baywatch** (1/6)		Local programming	
NBC		Chicago Med		Chicago Fire		Chicago P.D.	

Notes:

- Fox is scheduled to air a primetime NCAA Women's Volleyball Game on November 25, 2026 at 8 p.m.
- The CW is scheduled to air the 2026 Poinsettia Bowl on December 23, 2026 at 8 p.m.
- The CW is scheduled to air a special CW College Basketball game on January 27, 2027 at 10 p.m.

=== Thursday ===
Network		8:00 p.m.	8:30 p.m.	9:00 p.m.	9:30 p.m.	10:00 p.m.	10:30 p.m.
ABC		9-1-1		9-1-1: Nashville		Grey's Anatomy	
CBS	Fall	Georgie & Mandy's First Marriage	**Eternally Yours**	Elsbeth		**Cupertino**	
CBS	Winter	Georgie & Mandy's First Marriage	Ghosts (1/21)	Elsbeth		Matlock (1/21)	
The CW	Fall	Scrabble		Trivial Pursuit		Local programming	
The CW	Winter	Scrabble		Trivial Pursuit (R) (1/7)		Local programming	
Fox	Fall	Hell's Kitchen		Special Forces: World's Toughest Test		Local programming	
Fox	Late fall	Hell's Kitchen		Next Level Baker		Local programming	
Fox	Winter	Hell's Kitchen		Extracted (1/14)		Local programming	
Fox	Mid- winter	Next Level Chef (2/18)		Extracted (1/14)		Local programming	
NBC	Fall	**The Traitors: New Blood**		Law & Order: Special Victims Unit		Law & Order	
NBC	Winter	**The Rockford Files** (1/7)		Law & Order: Special Victims Unit		Law & Order	

Notes:

- NBC is scheduled to air a primetime special edition of NBC Sunday Night Football game on November 26, 2026 at 8:20 p.m.
- The CW is scheduled to air a special CW College Basketball game on December 31, 2026 at 8 p.m.
- Fox is scheduled to air a two-hour season premiere of Extracted on January 7, 2027 at 8 p.m.

=== Friday ===
Network		8:00 p.m.	8:30 p.m.	9:00 p.m.	9:30 p.m.	10:00 p.m.	10:30 p.m.
ABC	Fall	Celebrity Wheel of Fortune		20/20			
ABC	Winter	Celebrity Jeopardy! (1/29)		20/20			
CBS	Fall	Sheriff Country		Fire Country		Boston Blue	
CBS	Winter	**Einstein** (2/12)		Sheriff Country (2/12)		Boston Blue	
The CW	Fall	Various programming				Local programming	
The CW	Winter	Penn & Teller: Fool Us (1/22)		Masters of Illusion (1/22)		Local programming	
Fox	Fall	Fox College Football Friday					
Fox	Winter	Fox College Basketball Friday (12/4)				Local programming	
Fox	Spring	Fox UFL Friday					
NBC	Fall	**Line of Fire** (R)		Dateline NBC			
NBC	Mid-fall	Happy's Place	**Newlyweds**	Dateline NBC			

Notes:

- On select weeks, Fox College Football Friday games will begin at 9 p.m ET/6 p.m. PT instead of 8 p.m. ET/5 p.m. PT, with encores of programming airing in the 8 p.m. ET/PT hour.
- The CW is scheduled to air a special CW College Basketball game on December 11, 2026 at 8 p.m.
- CBS is scheduled to air Soul Train Awards 2026 on November 27, 2026 at 8 p.m.
- ABC is scheduled to air primetime College Football on ABC games on November 27, 2026 at 7:30 p.m. and December 4, 2026 at 8 p.m.
- NBC is scheduled to air a primetime College Football on NBC Sports game on November 27, 2026 at 7:30 p.m.
- CBS is scheduled to air the 2026 Pac-12 Football Championship Game on December 4, 2026 at 8 p.m.
- ABC is scheduled to air primetime NBA Christmas games on December 25, 2026 at 8 and 10:30 p.m.
- Fox is scheduled to an air NFL on Christmas Day game on December 25, 2026 at 8 p.m.

=== Saturday ===
Network		8:00 p.m.	8:30 p.m.	9:00 p.m.	9:30 p.m.	10:00 p.m.	10:30 p.m.
ABC	Fall	Saturday Night Football (7:30 p.m.)					
ABC	Winter	NBA Tip-Off (1/30)	NBA Saturday Primetime (1/30)				
ABC	Spring	ABC Hockey Saturday (3/20)					
ABC	Mid-spring	ESPN on ABC Sports programming					
CBS	Fall	College Football on CBS (7:30 p.m.)					
CBS	Mid-fall	Various programming				48 Hours	
The CW	Fall	CW Sports programming				CW College Football	
The CW	Winter	CW College Basketball (12/5)					
Fox	Fall	Fox College Football (7:30 p.m.)					
Fox	Winter	Fox Primetime Hoops (12/12)				Local programming	
Fox	Spring	Baseball Night in America (7:00 p.m.)				Local programming	
NBC	Fall	College Football on NBC (Note: Branded as Big Ten Saturday Night or Notre Dame Football on NBC depending on the game that is being broadcast.) (7:30 p.m.)					
NBC	Late fall	Password (R) (12/12)		Dateline Weekend Mystery (R) (12/5)		Saturday Night Live (R) (12/5)	
NBC	Winter	The Voice (R) (2/13)		Dateline Weekend Mystery (R) (12/5)		Saturday Night Live (R) (12/5)	

Notes:

- As with the ten previous seasons, affiliates in NBC's Pacific and Mountain Time Zone carry new episodes of Saturday Night Live in real time along with the rest of the United States, placing its airtime within the prime time period throughout this season (the primetime programming scheduled for those nights may air in an earlier slot, delayed for later viewing, placed on a different station to air in its original time slot or be preempted entirely); a re-air is broadcast after the late local news in those time zones. The network's affiliates in Alaska, Hawaii, and other Pacific islands carry the show on delay as usual.
- Fox is scheduled to air a primetime Fox Primetime Hoops game on November 28, 2026 at 7 p.m.
- Fox is scheduled to air a primetime Fox College Football game on November 28, 2026 at 9 p.m.
- Fox is scheduled to air the 2026 Big Ten Football Championship Game on December 5, 2026 at 8 p.m.
- CBS is scheduled to air UFC 335 on December 12, 2026 at 8 p.m.
- ABC is scheduled to air a NBA Saturday Primetime game on December 12, 2026 at 8:30 p.m.
- Fox is scheduled to air a primetime Fox College Hoops game on December 12, 2026 at 10 p.m.
- CBS is scheduled to air a special NFL on CBS game on December 19, 2026 at 8:20 p.m.
- ABC is scheduled to air the 2027 NHL Stadium Series game on February 20, 2027 at 8 p.m.

== By network ==
=== ABC ===
Returning series:

- 20/20
- 9-1-1
- 9-1-1: Nashville
- Abbott Elementary
- ABC Hockey Saturday
- American Idol
- The Bachelor
- Bachelor in Paradise
- Celebrity Jeopardy!
- Celebrity Wheel of Fortune
- Dancing with the Stars
- Grey's Anatomy
- High Potential
- Monday Night Countdown
- Monday Night Football
- NBA Saturday Primetime
- NBA Tip-Off
- R.J. Decker
- The Rookie
- Saturday Night Football
- Scrubs
- Shark Tank
- Shifting Gears
- What Would You Do?
- Who Wants to Be a Millionaire
- Will Trent

New series:

- Can You Hide... Shaq?
- Michael Strahan's Iconic
- The Rookie: North
- Surviving a Scandal
- Who's in the Band?

Not returning from 2025–26:

- Dirty Talk: When Daytime Talk Shows Ruled TV

=== CBS ===
Returning series:

- 48 Hours
- 60 Minutes
- The Amazing Race
- Big Brother
- Boston Blue
- CIA
- Elsbeth
- FBI
- Fire Country
- Georgie & Mandy's First Marriage
- Ghosts
- Harlan Coben's Final Twist
- Marshals
- Matlock
- NCIS
- NCIS: Origins
- NCIS: Sydney
- NFL on CBS
- Sheriff Country
- Survivor
- Tracker
- Undercover Boss

New series:

- 24 Hour Millionaire
- Cupertino
- Einstein
- Eternally Yours
- NCIS: New York
- Stacks of Cash

Not returning from 2025–26:

- DMV
- The Neighborhood
- Watson

=== The CW ===
Returning series:

- CW College Basketball
- CW College Football
- Law & Order Toronto: Criminal Intent
- Masters of Illusion
- Penn & Teller: Fool Us
- Police 24/7
- Scrabble
- Sullivan's Crossing
- Totally Funny Animals
- Trivial Pursuit
- Wild Cards
- WWE NXT

New series:

- The Great American Road Rally
- NXT Premium Live Events
- Private Eyes West Coast

Not returning from 2025–26:

- All American

=== Fox ===
Returning series:

- 99 to Beat
- American Dad!
- Animal Control
- Baseball Night in America
- Beat Shazam
- Best Medicine
- Bob's Burgers
- Celebrity Name That Tune
- Celebrity Weakest Link
- Crime Scene Kitchen
- Doc
- Don't Forget the Lyrics
- Extracted
- Family Guy
- Fear Factor: House of Fear
- The Floor
- Fox College Football
- Fox College Hoops
- Gordon Ramsay's Secret Service
- Grimsburg
- Hell's Kitchen
- Kitchen Nightmares
- Krapopolis
- Lego Masters
- The Masked Singer
- MasterChef
- Memory of a Killer
- Murder in a Small Town
- Nation's Dumbest
- Next Level Baker
- Next Level Chef
- NFL on Fox
- The OT
- The Simpsons
- Special Forces: World's Toughest Test
- UFL on Fox
- Universal Basic Guys

New series:

- Baywatch
- The Interrogator
- Marriage Market

Not returning from 2025–26:

- Going Dutch

=== NBC ===
Returning series:

- American Ninja Warrior
- Big Ten Saturday Night
- Chicago Fire
- Chicago Med
- Chicago P.D.
- Dateline NBC
- Destination X
- The Fall and Rise of Reggie Dinkins
- Football Night in America
- Happy's Place
- Law & Order
- Law & Order: Special Victims Unit
- NBA on NBC
- NBC Sunday Night Football
- St. Denis Medical
- The Voice
- WNBA on NBC

New series:

- Line of Fire
- Newlyweds
- The Rockford Files
- Sunset P.I.
- The Traitors: New Blood (Note: First NBC edition of the series; a celebrity version has aired on Peacock since 2023.)
- The Voice: Celebrity
- Wordle

Not returning from 2025–26:

- Brilliant Minds
- The Hunting Party
- Law & Order: Organized Crime
- On Brand with Jimmy Fallon
- Stumble
- Surviving Earth

== Renewals and cancellations ==
=== Full season pickups ===
==== ABC ====
- Scrubs—Picked up for a 10-episode full second season on April 30, 2026.

==== Fox ====
- Doc—Picked up for a 22-episode full third season on March 9, 2026.

==== NBC ====
- Line of Fire—Picked up for a 18-episode full first season on October 12, 2026.

=== Renewals ===
==== ABC ====
- ABC Hockey Saturday—Renewed for a fourteenth season on March 10, 2021.
- Monday Night Football—Renewed for an eighth season on March 18, 2021; deal will go to a thirteenth season in 2033.

==== CBS ====
- Big Brother—Renewed for a thirtieth season on October 1, 2026.

==== Fox ====
- American Dad!—Renewed for a twenty-fourth and twenty-fifth season on April 2, 2025.
- Bob's Burgers—Renewed for an eighteenth and nineteenth season on April 2, 2025.
- Family Guy—Renewed for a twenty-sixth and twenty-seventh season on April 2, 2025.
- Krapopolis—Renewed for a fifth season on May 10, 2025.
- The Simpsons—Renewed for a thirty-ninth and fortieth season on April 2, 2025.

==== NBC ====
- American Ninja Warrior—Renewed for a nineteenth and twentieth season on August 31, 2026.
- Big Ten Saturday Night—Renewed for a fifth season on August 18, 2022; deal will go to a seventh season in 2029.
- Football Night in America—Renewed for a twenty-second season on March 18, 2021; deal will go to a twenty-eighth season in 2033.
- NBC Sunday Night Football—Renewed for a twenty-second season on March 18, 2021; deal will go to a twenty-eighth season in 2033.
- The Traitors: New Blood—Renewed for a second season on November 19, 2026.

=== Cancellations/series endings ===
==== The CW ====
- The Great American Road Rally—This reality series is meant to run for one season only.

== See also ==
- 2026–27 Canadian network television schedule
- 2026–27 United States network television schedule (morning)
- 2026–27 United States network television schedule (daytime)
- 2026–27 United States network television schedule (late night)
- 2026–27 United States network television schedule (overnight)
