= 2026–27 Canadian network television schedule =

Television schedule for the five major English commercial broadcast networks in Canada

The 2026–27 network television schedule for the five major English commercial broadcast networks in Canada covers primetime hours from September 2026 through August 2027. The schedule is followed by a list per network of returning series, new series, and series canceled after the 2025–26 television season, for Canadian, American, and other series.

CBC Television was first to announce its fall schedule on May 22, 2026, followed by Citytv on June 2, 2026, Global on June 3, 2026, and CTV on June 4, 2026. Yes TV (including indieNET) and Omni Television are not included as member television stations have local flexibility over most of their schedules. CTV 2 is not included on Saturday as it normally only schedules encore programming in primetime on Saturdays.

== Legend ==
- Grey indicates encore programming.
- Blue-grey indicates news programming.
- Light green indicates sporting events/coverage.
- Light purple indicates movies.
- Red indicates Canadian content shows, which is programming that originated in Canada.
- Light yellow indicates the current schedule.

== Schedule ==
- New series to Canadian television are highlighted in **bold**.
- All times given are in Canadian Eastern Time. Subtract one hour for Central time for most programs (excluding CBC). Airtimes may vary in the Atlantic and Mountain times and do not necessarily align with U.S. stations in the Mountain time zone. Add one half-hour to Atlantic Time schedule for Newfoundland time. (See also: Effects of time zones on North American broadcasting)
- Dates (e.g., (9/13)) indicate the first month and day of a program in its regular timeslot, and also the premiere date.

=== Sunday ===
Network		7:00 p.m.	7:30 p.m.	8:00 p.m.	8:30 p.m.	9:00 p.m.	9:30 p.m.	10:00 p.m.	10:30 p.m.
CBC	Fall	Heartland		The Great Canadian Baking Show		**Must Love Dogs**	The Assembly	The National	
Citytv	Fall	Hudson & Rex (R)		The Simpsons	Animal Control	Universal Basic Guys	Grimsburg	Hudson & Rex (R)	
CTV	Fall	NFL on Fox/NFL on CBS overrun (continued to game completion)	NFL on CTV Live	Football Night in America	NBC Sunday Night Football				
CTV 2	Fall	CTV Movie							
Global	Fall	60 Minutes		Sunday Night Movie					

=== Monday ===
Network		7:00 p.m.	7:30 p.m.	8:00 p.m.	8:30 p.m.	9:00 p.m.	9:30 p.m.	10:00 p.m.	10:30 p.m.
CBC	Fall	Coronation Street	Family Feud Canada	Murdoch Mysteries		**I, Jack Wright**		The National	
Citytv	Fall	Family Feud		The Price Is Right Tonight		Hudson & Rex		**Line of Fire**	
CTV	Fall	Tracker		The Voice				The Traitors Canada	
CTV	Mid-fall	Tracker		St. Denis Medical	The Fall and Rise of Reggie Dinkins	The Voice		The Traitors Canada	
CTV 2	Fall	The Big Bang Theory (R)	Etalk	Monday Night Football					
Global	Fall	Abbott Elementary (R)	ET	FBI		CIA		Harlan Coben's Final Twist	

=== Tuesday ===
Network		7:00 p.m.	7:30 p.m.	8:00 p.m.	8:30 p.m.	9:00 p.m.	9:30 p.m.	10:00 p.m.	10:30 p.m.
CBC	Fall	Coronation Street	Family Feud Canada	This Hour Has 22 Minutes	Son of a Critch	Animal Control	Halifax Comedy Festival	The National	
Citytv	Fall	Family Feud		Dancing with the Stars				The Price Is Right Tonight (R)	
CTV	Fall	MasterChef Canada		Best Medicine		Doc		R.J. Decker	
CTV 2	Fall	The Big Bang Theory (R)	Etalk	CTV Movie					
Global	Fall	Abbott Elementary (R)	ET	NCIS		**NCIS: New York**		NCIS: Origins	

=== Wednesday ===
Network		7:00 p.m.	7:30 p.m.	8:00 p.m.	8:30 p.m.	9:00 p.m.	9:30 p.m.	10:00 p.m.	10:30 p.m.
CBC	Fall	Coronation Street	Family Feud Canada	**Doula: A True Crime**		The Passionate Eye		The National	
Citytv	Fall	Family Feud		Chicago Med		Chicago Fire		Chicago P.D.	
CTV	Fall	Etalk	Scrubs	The Floor		Georgie & Mandy's First Marriage	The Amazing Race		
CTV 2	Fall	The Big Bang Theory (R)	Etalk	The Rookie (R)		Celebrity Weakest Link		Shark Tank	
Global	Fall	Abbott Elementary (R)	ET	Survivor			**Private Eyes West Coast**		Abbott Elementary

=== Thursday ===
Network		7:00 p.m.	7:30 p.m.	8:00 p.m.	8:30 p.m.	9:00 p.m.	9:30 p.m.	10:00 p.m.	10:30 p.m.
CBC	Fall	Coronation Street	Family Feud Canada	Dragons' Den		**Trigger Point**		The National	
CBC	Mid-fall	Coronation Street	Family Feud Canada	Dragons' Den		**Lord of the Flies**		The National	
Citytv	Fall	Family Feud		Law & Order Toronto: Criminal Intent		Law & Order: Special Victims Unit		Law & Order	
CTV	Fall	Etalk	The Big Bang Theory (R)	**The Traitors: New Blood**		9-1-1: Nashville		Grey's Anatomy	
CTV 2	Fall	Thursday Night Football Pre-Game		Thursday Night Football					
Global	Fall	ET	**Eternally Yours**	9-1-1		Elsbeth		**Cupertino**	

=== Friday ===
Network		7:00 p.m.	7:30 p.m.	8:00 p.m.	8:30 p.m.	9:00 p.m.	9:30 p.m.	10:00 p.m.	10:30 p.m.
CBC	Fall	Coronation Street	Family Feud Canada (R)	Marketplace	About That with Andrew Chang	The Fifth Estate		The National	
Citytv	Fall	Family Feud		The Price Is Right Tonight (R)		Dateline NBC			
CTV	Fall	Etalk	**Newlyweds**	Celebrity Wheel of Fortune		**S.W.A.T. Exiles**		Boston Blue	
CTV 2	Fall	The Big Bang Theory (R)	Etalk	CTV Movie					
Global	Fall	Abbott Elementary (R)	ET	Sheriff Country		Fire Country		Crime Beat	

=== Saturday ===
Network		7:00 p.m.	7:30 p.m.	8:00 p.m.	8:30 p.m.	9:00 p.m.	9:30 p.m.	10:00 p.m.	10:30 p.m.
CBC	Fall	CBC Sports Primetime							
Citytv	Fall	Various programming						Hudson & Rex (R)	
CTV	Fall	CTV Movie						Encore programming (R)	
Global	Fall	Encore programming (R)						48 Hours	

== By network ==
=== CBC ===
Returning series:

- About That with Andrew Chang
- Animal Control
- The Assembly
- CBC Sports Primetime
- Coronation Street
- Dragons' Den
- Family Feud Canada
- The Fifth Estate
- The Great Canadian Baking Show
- Halifax Comedy Festival
- Heartland
- Marketplace
- Murdoch Mysteries
- The National
- The Passionate Eye
- Son of a Critch
- This Hour Has 22 Minutes

New series:

- Doula: A True Crime
- I, Jack Wright
- Lord of the Flies
- Must Love Dogs
- Trigger Point

Not returning from 2025–26:

=== Citytv ===
Returning series:

- Animal Control
- Chicago Fire
- Chicago Med
- Chicago P.D.
- Dancing with the Stars
- Dateline NBC
- Family Feud
- Grimsburg
- Hockey Night in Canada
- Hudson & Rex
- Law & Order
- Law & Order: Special Victims Unit
- Law & Order Toronto: Criminal Intent
- The Price Is Right Tonight
- The Simpsons
- Universal Basic Guys

New series:

- Line of Fire

Not returning from 2025–26:

=== CTV/CTV 2 ===
Returning series:

- 9-1-1: Nashville
- The Amazing Race
- Best Medicine
- The Big Bang Theory
- Big Brother (moved from Global)
- Big Brother Canada (moved from Global)
- Boston Blue
- Celebrity Jeopardy!
- Celebrity Weakest Link
- Celebrity Wheel of Fortune
- Doc (moved from Global)
- Etalk
- The Fall and Rise of Reggie Dinkins
- Fear Factor: House of Fear
- The Floor
- Georgie & Mandy's First Marriage
- Grey's Anatomy
- High Potential
- The Masked Singer
- MasterChef Canada
- Memory of a Killer
- Monday Night Football
- R.J. Decker
- The Rookie
- Scrubs
- Shark Tank
- Shifting Gears
- St. Denis Medical
- Sunday Night Football
- Thursday Night Football
- Tracker
- The Traitors Canada
- The Voice
- Will Trent

New series:

- Newlyweds
- The Rookie: North
- Sunset P.I.
- S.W.A.T. Exiles
- The Traitors: New Blood
- Untitled Grey's Anatomy spin-off

Not returning from 2025–26:

=== Global ===
Returning series:

- 48 Hours
- 60 Minutes
- 9-1-1
- Abbott Elementary
- CIA
- Crime Beat
- Elsbeth
- ET
- FBI
- Fire Country
- Ghosts
- Harlan Coben's Final Twist
- Matlock
- Murder in a Small Town
- NCIS
- NCIS: Origins
- NCIS: Sydney
- Sheriff Country
- Survivor

New series:

- Cupertino
- Eternally Yours
- NCIS: New York

Not returning from 2025–26:

- Big Brother (moved to CTV)
- Big Brother Canada (moved to CTV)
- Doc (moved to CTV)

== See also ==
- 2026–27 United States network television schedule
