= 2027 in American television =

Certain American television events in 2027 have been scheduled. Events listed include television show debuts, finales, and cancellations; channel launches, closures, and rebrandings; stations changing or adding their network affiliations; information on controversies, business transactions, and carriage disputes; and deaths of those who made various contributions to the medium.

== Future events ==
=== January ===
Date	Event	Ref
3	The 32nd Critics Choice Awards will be simulcast on E! and USA Network from the Barker Hangar in Santa Monica, California, with Janelle James set to host the ceremony. This will be the third consecutive ceremony to air on E! and the second consecutive year the ceremony is simulcast on both networks.	
10	The 84th Golden Globe Awards will air on CBS from The Beverly Hilton. Nikki Glaser is set to return for her third consecutive year as host.	

=== February ===
Date	Event	Ref
7	The 69th Annual Grammy Awards will air on ABC from the Crypto.com Arena in Los Angeles, with streaming on Disney+ and Hulu. This will be the first Grammy Awards ceremony to air on ABC since the 14th Grammy Awards in 1972.	
14	Super Bowl LXI will be played at SoFi Stadium in Inglewood, California. The game will be simulcast on ESPN and ABC, making it the first Super Bowl to be simulcast on the two sister networks. This will also mark the first Super Bowl to air on ABC since Super Bowl XL in 2006, as well as the first Super Bowl to broadcast on ESPN. Jay-Z is set to headline the halftime show. Disney+, Disney Channel, and Disney XD will also air an alternate telecast animated in real time and featuring characters from the Star Wars franchise.	
28	The 33rd Actor Awards will stream live on Netflix.	

=== March ===
Date	Event	Ref
14	The 99th Academy Awards will air on ABC from Los Angeles' Dolby Theatre. Conan O'Brien is set to return for his third consecutive year as host.	

=== April ===
Date	Event	Ref

=== May ===
Date	Event	Ref
16	The 62nd Academy of Country Music Awards will stream live on Prime Video from the MGM Grand Garden Arena in Las Vegas.	

=== June ===
Date	Event	Ref
13	The 80th Tony Awards will air on CBS from Radio City Music Hall in New York City, with streaming on Paramount+.	
TBA	Christiane Amanpour will leave CNN after working with the network for 43 years.	

=== July ===
Date	Event	Ref

=== August ===
Date	Event	Ref

=== September ===
Date	Event	Ref
TBA	The 79th Primetime Emmy Awards will stream live on Prime Video as part of a six-year deal with Amazon and the Academy of Television Arts & Sciences. This will also be the first Emmy ceremony not to air on a broadcast network and on broadcast television since the first ceremony in 1949.	

=== October ===
Date	Event	Ref

=== November ===
Date	Event	Ref

=== December ===
Date	Event	Ref

== Television shows ==
=== Shows debuting in 2027 ===
First aired	Title	Channel	Source
January 1	The Twin	Netflix	
January 5	Surviving a Scandal	ABC	
January 6	The Rookie: North	ABC	
January 6	Stacks of Cash	CBS	
January 7	The Gotti Files	A&E	
January 10	Bosch: Start of Watch	MGM+	
January 13	The Spot	Hulu	
January 13	Fallout Shelter: The Experiment	Amazon Prime Video	
January 13	Criminal	Amazon Prime Video	
January 20	Bloodaxe	Amazon Prime Video	
January 22	Neuromancer	Apple TV	
January 27	She's Fine	Apple TV	
February 4	Don't Date Alone with Trisha Paytas	Tubi	
February 8	Sunset P.I.	NBC	
February 9	The Interrogator	Fox	
February 10	Barbershop	Amazon Prime Video	
February 12	Einstein	CBS	
February 15	The Land	Hulu	
February 18	The Age of Innocence	Netflix	
February	Oswald	Disney+	
March	Skye's Pup Squad	Nickelodeon	
Early	Deadliest Catch: Northern Edge	Discovery Channel	
Early	I Am Prey	Discovery Channel	
Early	Dan the Donut Man	Food Network	
Early	Wildcard Kitchen: High Rollers at Sea	Food Network	
April 16	Wild Things	Apple TV	
May	Lindbergh	PBS	
Spring	The Voice: Celebrity	NBC	
Spring	The Savant	Apple TV	
Summer	Who's In The Band?	ABC	
October 31	Afterlife with Archie	Disney+	
Fall	The Bureau: A Secret History of the FBI	PBS	
TBA	Cars: Lightning Racers	Disney Jr.	
TBA	Avengers: Mightiest Friends	Disney Jr.	
TBA	Motel Translyvania	Netflix	
TBA	Ghostbusters: Night Shift	Netflix	
TBA	Scooby-Doo: Origins	Netflix	
TBA	Simon Says	Netflix	
TBA	Monopoly	Netflix	
TBA	The Sticks	Netflix	
TBA	Sonic	Netflix	
TBA	Diablo	Netflix	
TBA	Ladies of the House	Netflix	
TBA	Celebrity Million Dollar Secret	Netflix	
TBA	Planeswalker	Netflix	
TBA	Stewie	Fox	
TBA	Mammoth	Fox	
TBA	Katie Greaves	Fox	
TBA	Making Love	Paramount+	
TBA	Fear Not	Paramount+	
TBA	The Best of Us	Paramount+	
TBA	Untitled Clueless sequel limited series	Paramount+	
TBA	Ascent	Paramount+	
TBA	Discretion	Paramount+	
TBA	Vought Rising	Amazon Prime Video	
TBA	Reality Retreat	Amazon Prime Video	
TBA	Point Break	AMC	
TBA	Thunder Road	AMC/AMC+	
TBA	Happy Jack	AMC/AMC+	
TBA	Snapped: Rich Bitch Rampage	Oxygen	
TBA	Untitled Grey's Anatomy spinoff	ABC	
TBA	Limited Time Offer	ABC	
TBA	Superfakes	Peacock	
TBA	Clap If You Care: The Wendy Williams Show	Peacock	
TBA	Love Trapped: The Case of Laura Owens	Peacock	
TBA	Wordle	NBC	
TBA	Untitled Cartoon Network docuseries	Adult Swim	
TBA	The Trial of Louise Woodward	HBO	
TBA	Crazy Rich Asians	HBO	
TBA	Yokoso Scooby-Doo!	Tubi	
TBA	Change of Heart	Hallmark+	
TBA	Kingdom Hearts: The Series	Disney Channel/Disney+	
TBA	Artemis Fowl	Disney Channel/Disney+	
TBA	Legends	FX/Hulu	
TBA	The People v. Gorilla Grodd	HBO Max	
TBA	Let's Go Back To Your Place	HGTV	
TBA	Uptown Girl: The Christie Brinkley Story	Fox Nation	
TBA	Scarlett Holmes	The Roku Channel	
TBA	Deep Dive	CNN	
TBA	The Black Tapes	MGM+	
TBA	Shelf Life	Angel	
TBA	Untitled Whitney Leavitt reality show	Hulu	
TBA	The Real Frozen	Nat Geo	

=== Shows changing networks ===
Show	Moved from	Moved to	Source
Somebody Feed Phil	Netflix	YouTube	
Westminster Kennel Club Dog Show	Fox Sports	Netflix	

=== Television films and specials ===
First aired	Title	Channel	Source
January 1	Bernie Taupin: Life, Music, Elton & Me	CNN	
January 23	Black Widow Killer: The Judy Buenoano Story	Lifetime	
February 1	American Idol at 25	ABC	
February 21	Kevin Fredericks: Grief Sucks	Tubi	
February	Spectacle: Michael Jackson at the Super Bowl	ESPN/Hulu	
Early	Battle of the Streaming Stars II	The Roku Channel	
Early	Harlem Globetrotters 100th Anniversary Special	The Roku Channel	
Early	She Married Her Murderer: The Susan Cox Powell Story	Lifetime	
Early	Murder in Cold Country	Lifetime	
Fall	Marvel Zombies: The Winter Soldier	Disney+	
TBA	The Americas: Mother's Day	NBC	
TBA	Untitled Robot Chicken anthology special	Adult Swim	
TBA	The Cheetah Girls: Next Gen	Disney Channel/Disney+	
TBA	Hidden Heroes: A Descendants Story	Disney Channel/Disney+	
TBA	Zombies 5: Secrets of the Sea	Disney Channel/Disney+	
TBA	Buried in Barstow: Blood for Blood	Lifetime	
TBA	Buried in Barstow: The Reckoning	Lifetime	
TBA	The Girl Who Disappeared	Lifetime	
TBA	Double Double Trouble 2	Lifetime	
TBA	Untitled Futurama specials	Hulu	
TBA	The It Girls: Inside the 2000s	The Roku Channel	
TBA	Untitled Curious Caterer movie	Hallmark Channel	

=== Milestone episodes and anniversaries ===
Show	Network	Episode #	Episode title	Episode airdate	Source
American Idol	ABC	25th anniversary	American Idol at 25	February 1	
Ghosts	CBS	100th episode	TBA	TBA	
Gabby's Dollhouse	Netflix	100th episode	TBA	TBA	

=== Shows returning in 2027 ===
Show	Last aired	Type of return	Previous channel	New/returning/same channel	Return date	Source
The Rockford Files	1980	Reboot	NBC	same	January 2	
Baywatch	2001	Reboot	Syndication	Fox	January 6	
3 Body Problem	2024	New season	Netflix	same	January 14	
Blue Eye Samurai	2023	New season	Netflix	same	January 19	
Ahsoka	2023	New season	Disney+	same	January 20	
Presumed Innocent	2024	New season	Apple TV	same	February 19	
Undercover Boss	2022	Revival	CBS	same	February 24	
The Bachelor	2025	New season	ABC	same	March 21	
Thomas & Friends: All Engines Go (as Thomas & Friends: Railway Stories)	2025	Reboot	Netflix	same	Early	
Bachelor in Paradise	2025	New season	ABC	same	Summer	
The Joker's Wild	2019	Reboot	TNT	Syndication	Fall	
Highway to Heaven	1989	Reboot	NBC	Fox	TBA	
I'm a Celebrity...Get Me Out of Here! (as Get Me Out of Here)	2009	Reboot	NBC	Peacock	TBA	
Girls	2017	Revival	HBO	same	TBA	
Clifford the Big Red Dog	2021	Reboot	Amazon Prime Video/PBS Kids	PBS Kids	TBA	
True Detective	2024	New season	HBO	same	TBA	

=== Shows ending in 2027 ===
End date	Show	Channel	First aired	Status	Source
January 22	Yellowjackets	Showtime	2021	Ending	
January 29	P-Valley	Starz	2020	Ending	
Early	Miss Scarlet and The Duke	PBS	2020	Ending	
Early	Mayor of Kingstown	Paramount+	2021	Ending	
Early	The Walking Dead: Daryl Dixon	AMC	2023	Ending	
Spring	Star Trek: Starfleet Academy	Paramount+	2026	Ending	
June	The Amanpour Hour	CNN	2023	Ending	
Summer	Silo	Apple TV	2023	Ending	
TBA	Criminal Minds: Evolution	Paramount+	2005	Ending	
TBA	The Morning Show	Apple TV	2019	Ending	
TBA	For All Mankind	Apple TV	2019	Ending	
TBA	The Witcher	Netflix	2019	Ending	
TBA	Godfather of Harlem	MGM+	2019	Ending	
TBA	Industry	HBO	2020	Ending	
TBA	Gabby's Dollhouse	Netflix	2021	Ending	
TBA	Star Trek: Strange New Worlds	Paramount+	2022	Ending	
TBA	From	MGM+	2022	Ending	
TBA	The Lincoln Lawyer	Netflix	2022	Ending	
TBA	The Night Agent	Netflix	2023	Ending	
TBA	Avatar: The Last Airbender	Netflix	2024	Ending	
TBA	A Man on the Inside	Netflix	2024	Ending	
TBA	Devil May Cry	Netflix	2025	Ending	
TBA	Daredevil: Born Again	Disney+	2025	Ending	

=== Entering syndication in 2027 ===
A list of programs (current or canceled) that have accumulated enough episodes (between 65 and 100) or seasons (three or more) to be eligible for off-network syndication or basic cable runs.

Show	Seasons	In Production	Notes	Source

== Networks and services ==
=== Launches ===
Network/ service	Type	Launch date	Notes	Sources

=== Conversions and rebrandings ===
Old network name	New network name	Type	Conversion date	Notes	Source

=== Closures ===
Network/ service	Type	Closure date	Notes	Source
FanDuel TV	Cable/satellite channel	TBA	In March 2026, FanDuel announced plans to close FanDuel TV by the end of 2027. This will mark the second national FanDuel branded channel to close, following FanDuel Sports Network in September 2026.	

== Television stations ==
=== Subchannel launches ===
Date	Market	Station	Channel	Affiliation	Notes	Source

=== Stations changing network affiliations ===
Date	Market	Station	Channel	Prior affiliation	New affiliation	Notes	Source

=== Subchannels changing network affiliations ===
Date	Market	Station	Channel	Prior affiliation	New affiliation	Notes	Source

== Deaths ==
=== January ===
Date	Name	Age	Notes	Sources
