= Carthage Courthouse Square Historic District =

Carthage Courthouse Square Historic District may refer to:

- Carthage Courthouse Square Historic District (Carthage, Illinois), listed on the NRHP in Illinois
- Carthage Courthouse Square Historic District (Carthage, Missouri), listed on the NRHP in Missouri
