= 2026 Holiday Bowl =

2026 Holiday Bowl may refer to:

- 2026 Holiday Bowl (January), contested between the Arizona Wildcats and SMU Mustangs following the 2025 FBS season
- 2026 Holiday Bowl (December), scheduled for December 28, 2026, following the 2026 FBS season
