= The Great American Road Rally =

American dating reality television series

- Also known as: The Great American Road Rally: Celebrity Edition
- Genre: Reality competition
- Directed by: Chad Hoerner
- Presented by: Ian Ziering
- Starring: Johnny Estrada; Dan Stoll
- No. of seasons: 1
- No. of episodes: 7

Production
- Executive producers: Eric Richey; Gary Bridges; Ian Ziering; Colleen Cole-Velasquez
- Producers: Eric Richey; Gary Bridges; Chad Hoerner; Brett Clark; Laurel Ripley; Christi Richey; Kwyn Bridges; John Bohlinger; Glen Parrish; Ben Hoskins; Joseph Jacobson
- Production company: 7 Bridges Media Group

Original release
- Network: The CW
- Release: September 16, 2026 – present

The Great American Road Rally, also known as The Great American Road Rally: Celebrity Edition is an American reality competition series which premiered on September 16, 2026, on The CW.

== Contestants ==
Contestant	Notability	Driving for	Result
John Schneider	Actor	James Burton Foundation in conjunction with Carpe Artista	Participating
Kevin Lawson	Actor	A Soldier's Child Foundation	Participating
Jesse Love (Episodes 1, 2, TBA)	2025 NOAPS Champion	Friends of Jaclyn Foundation	Participating
Denis Murphy (Episodes 2, TBA)	Friends of Jaclyn	Friends of Jaclyn Foundation	Participating
Joe Valento (Episodes 3, TBA)	NASCAR Driver	Friends of Jaclyn Foundation	Participating
John O'Hurley (Episodes 1, 3, TBA)	Actor	Challenged Athletes Foundation	Participating
Jamie Kaler (Episodes 2, TBA)	Actor/Comedian	Challenged Athletes Foundation	Participating
Oleg Prudius	Actor/Pro Wrestler	FDNY Foundation	Participating
Shilo Harris	Decorated Combat Veteran	Helping a Hero	Participating
Nik West (Episodes 1, 3, TBA)	Musician	Boys & Girls Clubs of America	Participating
Erin Murphy (Episodes 2, 3, TBA)	Actress	Boys & Girls Clubs of America	Participating
Audrey Eckert (Episodes 1–3, TBA)	Miss USA	Operation Light Shine	Participating
Madison Beck (Episodes 2, 3, TBA)	Miss Missouri USA	Operation Light Shine	Participating
Sam J. Jones (Episodes 1, 2, TBA)	Actor	Heart Browser	Participating
Butch Patrick (Episodes 3, TBA)	Actor	Heart Browser	Participating
Erik Estrada (Episodes 1, 3, TBA)	Actor	Route 66: The Road Ahead Partnership	Participating
John Henson (Episodes 2, TBA)	Comedian/TV Personality	Route 66: The Road Ahead Partnership	Participating

== Production ==
On January 13, 2026, it was announced that The CW had ordered the series. Originally scheduled for May 13, 2026 and then September 2, 2026, the series premiered on September 16, 2026.

== Episodes ==
No.	Title	Original release date	Prod. code	U.S. viewers (millions)	Rating/share (18-49)
1	"The Send-Off"	September 16, 2026	101	N/A	TBA
Episode 1 Results: Chicago / Willowbrook, Illinois ——▶ St. Louis, Missouri: Roadside Table: Dell Rhea's Chicken Basket, Willowbrook; Roadside Oddity: Gemini Giant, Wilmington; Route 66 Lore: Pontiac's Route 66 murals and the Old Log Cabin; The View: The Illinois prairie at golden hour; Landmark: Chain of Rocks Bridge; Guests: Erin Murphy, Skip Martin, Tammy Pescatelli, Jamie Kaler, Stephanie Boswell, Butch Patrick, Jackie Joyner-Kersee, Charlene Tilton, Taylor Hicks, John Henson, Santino Marella, Callie Truelove, Denis Murphy
2	"Gateway West"	September 23, 2026	102	N/A	TBA
Episode 2 Results: St. Louis, Missouri ——▶ Springfield, Missouri: Landmark: Gateway Arch; Route 66 Lore: Meramec Caverns, Stanton, Missouri; Neon & Motels: Cuba's mural mile and the restored Wagon Wheel Motel; Roadside Oddity: World's Largest Rocking Chair, Fanning, Missouri; The View: Devils Elbow, Missouri; Guests: Skip Martin, Tammy Pescatelli, Stephanie Boswell, Butch Patrick, Jackie Joyner-Kersee, Charlene Tilton, Taylor Hicks, Santino Marella, Callie Truelove, Kelsey Pumel-Woods, Curtis Woods, Bob Babbitt, Colton Kelly, Chase, Craig Campbell, Sean Fitzgibbons; Lap Drivers: John Schneider (The Duke), Kevin Lawson (The Tick), Jesse Love, Jamie Kaler, Oleg Prudius (Superhero), Shilo Harris (Papa Roast), Erin Murphy (MadDog), Audrey Eckert (Miss USA), Sam J. Jones (The Flash), John Henson (The Groom): 1. Jesse Love; 2. Shilo Harris (47.067); 3. Kevin Lawson (47.151); 4. Erin Murphy (48.520); 5. John Schneider (49.598); 6. Audrey Eckert (49.679); 7. John Henson (49.867); 8. Sam J. Jones (50.869); 9. Jamie Kaler (51.178); 10. Oleg Prudius (61.096)
3	"Three-State Run"	September 30, 2026	103	N/A	TBA
Episode 3 Results: Springfield, Missouri ——▶ Tulsa, Oklahoma: The View: Tulsa's art-deco skyline arriving over the Arkansas River; Roadside Oddity: Blue Whale of Catoosa; Neon & Motels: Coleman Theatre; Route 66 Lore: Galena, Kansas; Landmark: Carthage Courthouse Square Historic District; Guests: Charlene Tilton, Kelsey Pumel-Woods, Chase, Amy Francka, Callie Truelove, Curtis Woods, Taylor Hicks, Craig Campbell, Stephanie Boswell, Tammy Pescatelli, Skip Martin, Jaclyn Murphy, Ross Cox; Leaderboard: 1. Chase – Friends of Jaclyn Foundation – Ace of Spades/Ace of Diamonds; 2. Jamie Kaler – James Burton Foundation in conjunction with Carpe Artista – Nine of Spades/King of Diamonds; 3. Shilo Harris – Helping a Hero – Ace of Spades; 4. Kevin Lawson – A Soldier's Child Foundation – King of Spades; 5. Erin Murphy – Boys & Girls Clubs of America – Queen of Spades; 6. John Henson – Route 66: The Road Ahead Partnership – Jack of Spades; 7. Audrey Eckert – Operation Light Shine – Ten of Spades; 8. Sam J. Jones – Heart Browser – Eight of Spades; 9. John O'Hurley – Challenged Athletes Foundation – Seven of Spades; 10. Oleg Prudius – FDNY Foundation – Six of Spades
4	"Mother Road Country"	October 7, 2026	104	N/A	TBA
Episode 4 Results: Roadside Table: Roadside Oddity: Route 66 Lore: The View: Landmark: Neon & Motels: Guests:
5	"The Panhandle"	October 14, 2026	105	N/A	TBA
Episode 5 Results: Roadside Table: Roadside Oddity: Route 66 Lore: The View: Landmark: Neon & Motels: Guests:
6	"High Plains"	October 21, 2026	106	TBD	TBA
Episode 6 Results: Roadside Table: Roadside Oddity: Route 66 Lore: The View: Landmark: Neon & Motels: Guests:
7	"The Divide"	November 11, 2026	107	TBD	TBA
Episode 7 Results: Roadside Table: Roadside Oddity: Route 66 Lore: The View: Landmark: Neon & Motels: Guests:
