= Kat Cunning =

American actor, model, dancer and musician

- Cunning at the 2026 Toronto International Film Festival
- Born: Kat Cunningham
- Education: SUNY Purchase
- Occupations: Actor; model; dancer; musician
- Website: www.katcunning.com

Katrina Cunningham is an American actor, model, dancer, singer and musician. They performed in Les Liaisons Dangereuses (2016), Cirque Du Soleil's Paramour, and NYC's Sleep No More. Cunning appeared in the recurring role of Christina Fuego in the later two seasons of The Deuce on HBO starring James Franco and Maggie Gyllenhaal. More recently, Cunning starred as the mysterious chanteuse Sabine in the Netflix series Trinkets based on the books by Kirsten Smith. They play blackfishing white rapper Reina Reign in Issa Rae's Rap Sh!t.

== Career ==
Cunning began their career by performing in Baroque-Burlesque Operas with Company XIV. Following their 2016 Broadway debut, they performed in Refinery 29's sold out 29 Rooms and opened for the sold out North American Tour for LP.

Their singles "Baby" "Wild Poppies" and "Stay on the Line" have received praise for their overt displays of queer sexuality.

Cunning appears as Christina Fuego in The Deuce on HBO.

Cunning plays Sabine in the Netflix show Trinkets, and their original songs "Birds" and "King of Shadow" are featured on the show.

For the 2019 Hulu adaptation of John Green's Looking for Alaska, Cunning covered Alexi Murdoch's song "Orange Sky". Their single "For The Love" has been called a "rallying cry for hope and strength in the face of adversity" by Billboard. On August 20, 2020, Cunning officially signed with Lava Records.

Cunning played the role of Claire Hollingsworth on Line of Fire.

== Personal life ==
Residing in Los Angeles, Cunning is queer and non-binary, using they/them pronouns. In 2026 they announced their engagement to Fire Country star Jules Latimer.

Cunning received a BFA in Dance from SUNY Purchase.

== Awards ==
- Best Actor. Nothing Serious. 2016 Trail Dance Film Festival
- Best Supporting Actor. Pepper and the Salt Sea. 2016 Damn! Series
