= Doc (2025 TV series) =

2025 American medical drama

- Genre: Medical drama
- Based on: Doc – Nelle tue mani by: Francesco Arlanch; Viola Rispoli
- Developed by: Barbie Kligman
- Showrunners: Barbie Kligman; Hank Steinberg
- Starring: Molly Parker; Omar Metwally; Jon Ecker; Amirah Vann; Anya Banerjee; Patrick Walker; Charlotte Fountain-Jardim; Felicity Huffman; Blair Underwood
- Music by: James S. Levine
- Country of origin: United States
- Original language: English
- No. of seasons: 3
- No. of episodes: 40

Production
- Executive producers: Rebecca Thomas; Judith McCreary; John Weber; Frank Siracusa; Russell Lee Fine; Erwin Stoff; Hank Steinberg; Barbie Kligman
- Producers: Luca Bernabei; Nick Iannelli; Katie Varney; Victoria Woods; Molly Parker
- Cinematography: David Greene; Fraser Brown
- Editors: D. Gillian Truster; Jonathan Eagan; Lauren Brandon; Duncan Christie
- Running time: 44 minutes
- Production companies: Channel Road Productions; Avenue K Productions; Fox Entertainment Studios; Sony Pictures Television

Original release
- Network: Fox
- Release: January 7, 2025 – present

Doc is an American medical drama television series developed by Barbie Kligman which premiered on January 7, 2025 on Fox and stars Molly Parker in the lead role. It is based on the Italian series Doc – Nelle tue mani (2020–present), which in turn was inspired by the true story of Dr. Pierdante Piccioni, former chief of the emergency room of Lodi and Codogno, who forgot the previous 12 years of his own life following a 2013 car accident.

The series has received mixed reviews from critics.

In March 2026, Fox renewed the series for a third season which premiered on September 22, 2026.

== Premise ==
Dr. Amy Larsen, the chief of internal medicine at Minneapolis's fictional Westside Hospital, suffers a traumatic brain injury in a car accident that causes her to lose her memory of the last eight years. She struggles to resume her medical career and build a new life after the events she cannot remember, which include a divorce from her husband and a tragedy that made her push others away.

== Cast and characters ==
=== Main ===
- Molly Parker as Dr. Amy Larsen, attending physician in internal medicine, former Chief of Internal Medicine prior to her accident where she lost the memories of the past eight years, and new co-chief resident along with Sonya in season 3
- Omar Metwally as Dr. Michael Hamda, former Chief Medical Officer, new Chief of Internal Medicine in season 3, and Amy's ex-husband
- Jon Ecker as Dr. Jake Heller, chief resident in seasons 1 and 2, cardiology fellow in season 3, and Amy's ex-boyfriend
- Amirah Vann as Dr. Gina Walker, a neuropsychiatrist, and Amy's best friend
- Anya Banerjee as Dr. Sonya Maitra, a third-year resident in seasons 1 and 2, new co-chief resident along with Amy in season 3, and TJ’s girlfriend
- Patrick Walker as Dr. Theodore "TJ" Coleman (seasons 2–present; recurring season 1), a first-year resident in seasons 1 and 2, and Sonya’s boyfriend
- Charlotte Fountain-Jardim as Katie Hamda (season 2; recurring season 1; guest season 3), Amy and Michael's daughter
- Felicity Huffman as Dr. Joan Ridley (season 2), new Chief of Internal Medicine and Amy's mentor who passed away by the start of season 3
- Blair Underwood as Dr. Ben Grant (season 3; special guest season 2), new Chief of Surgery who had a dalliance with Amy a few years before her accident

=== Recurring ===
- Scott Wolf as Dr. Richard Miller (seasons 1–2), briefly replaced Amy as Chief of Internal Medicine, eventually relocating to Eastside in season 3
- Sarah Allen as Nora Hamda, Michael's second wife whom he divorced at the end of season 2
- Claire Armstrong as Nurse Julie Kenner
- Conni Miu as Nurse Liz Kwon
- Darrin Baker as Max Garner, chairmen of the hospital board
- Allan Dobrescu as Darrin Amalia, tech
- Emma Pfitzer Price as Hannah Clark (season 2), a new intern whose father used to work under Amy
- Daniel Gravelle as Charlie Clark (season 2), Hannah's brother
- Samantha Massell as Rachel (seasons 2–present), Jake's ex-wife
- Tennille Read as Wendy (seasons 2–present), Gina's wife
- Barrett Carnahan as Graham Barker (season 3), a new intern who is the son of one Westside's donors
- Raffa Virago as Nikki De Silva (season 3), a new intern
- Cecilia Lee as Ruth Chen (season 3), a new intern
- Kolton Stewart as Kyle Ferguson (season 3), a new intern
- Nazanin Boniadi as Sasha (season 3), a colleague of Ben's who is helping with his clinical trial

=== Guest ===
- Timothy Vincent Murphy as Chaplain Eamon O'Leary (season 2)
- Brian Tee as Bobby Ho (season 2)
- Judd Hirsch as Herman Zweig (season 2)

== Episodes ==
=== Series overview ===
Season	Episodes	Originally released	
Season	Episodes	First released	Last released
1	10	January 7, 2025	March 18, 2025
2	22	September 14, 2025	April 14, 2026
3	22	September 22, 2026	TBA

=== Season 1 (2025) ===
No. overall	No. in season	Title	Directed by	Written by	Original release date	U.S. viewers (millions)
1	1	"If at First You Don't Succeed..."	Rebecca Thomas	Barbie Kligman	January 7, 2025	2.22
Chief of Internal Medicine Dr. Amy Larsen is a great doctor, but doesn't have the best bedside or professional manner. She is on thin ice with the hospital board due to her behavior. She is secretly dating Chief Resident Dr. Jake Heller. Amy asks Dr. Richard Miller about a patient of his, Bill Dixon, who died, and wants to know if he accidentally gave him metoprolol, which can't be mixed with the medication he was given. He denies this and says that he aspirated on his lunch and could not be saved. Amy tells him that she ordered an autopsy and, if he lied, he is done. After treating a pregnant patient and her co-workers rudely, her ex-husband, Dr. Michael Hamda, the Chief Medical Officer, tells her to go home for the night. On the way home, she gets into a car accident and suffers a traumatic brain injury. When she wakes up from surgery, she has lost the memories from the last eight years of her life. Jake administers a test ordered for the pregnant patient by Amy, which ends up saving her life. Richard replaces Amy as Chief. Amy asks Michael to help her become a doctor again.
2	2	"...Try Try Again"	Rebecca Thomas	Barbie Kligman	January 14, 2025	2.52
While still recovering, Amy watches Jake treat Simone, who had a lupus flare. Amy interrupts a board meeting to request she become a doctor again, but they refuse. Desperate to prove herself, Amy pressures Jake to follow her recommendations for Simone's treatment, but she rapidly declines, putting Jake and the hospital in jeopardy. Richard gets ahold of Bill Dixon's autopsy results and changes the chart to cover up his mistake. Amy's friend, psychiatrist Dr. Gina Walker, tries to help Amy navigate her new unknown life after she's discharged. Flashbacks reveal how Amy pushed away family and friends after the death of her son Danny seven years before and how cold she's been towards the staff, including Dr. Sonya Maitra. Jake is kind to her, as is Dr. TJ Coleman, who has a previous history with Amy. Amy realizes what's wrong with Simone and helps Jake save her life. Amy later tells Michael that she'll become a doctor elsewhere, because it's one part of her she loves and still has. Michael convinces the board to let Amy stay or risk the hospital being sued. Amy's daughter Katie stops by, but is distant, still hurt by Amy's past actions. Later, Amy calls Katie to apologize and promises to be there for her.
3	3	"Day One"	Russell Lee Fine	Teleplay by : Hank Steinberg; Story by : Barbie Kligman	January 21, 2025	2.33
Gina and Michael tell Amy that the board is requiring her to shadow other doctors and re-take the board exams in order to become a doctor again. Though Richard assigns Amy to follow Sonya, Jake assigns her to TJ, knowing Sonya's dislike of Amy. Amy's first case is Evan, who is experiencing abdominal pain. Amy suspects alcohol abuse, but Evan denies it. Richard reprimands both Jake and TJ for not keeping Amy in check. Sonya and Jake examine Dante, who has an aortic aneurysm that requires a risky surgery because of Dante's old age. While in the hospital, Dante's wife, Ruby, suddenly dies from a heart attack and he decides to leave without treatment, saying he has lived a full life and is ready to die. When Evan's case worsens, Richard takes over. Amy goes to Evan's workplace and figures out the true cause of Evan's symptoms. TJ administers the correct treatment, saving Evan's life. Jake recalls his interactions with Amy before they were dating, when he fought for TJ and other interns, though Amy was impressed. Amy tries to get into her emails, but can't remember her password. Remembering their earlier interactions, Jake is able to give Amy her password and she gets access.
4	4	"One Small Step"	Debs Paterson	Judith McCreary	January 28, 2025	2.08
Amy combs through all of her previous correspondence to help her memory, but it doesn't help. However, she notices the way her behavior changed towards Michael after Danny's death and asks Michael to tell her what happened to Danny. He refuses to talk about it, though. Amy asks Katie if she became distant after Danny died, which Katie confirms. Amy apologizes and promises to try better going forward. Michael sees Katie crying and assumes Amy upset her until Katie corrects him. Sonya and TJ clash while treating a Marine. TJ, a former Army Ranger, later helps the Marine avoid getting court-martialed. Richard and Jake treat Cece, an Alzheimer's patient, but she refuses to be helped by anyone but Amy, who she saw previously. Amy pretends to be her prior self and helps Jake figure out that Cece doesn't have Alzheimer's, but heart embolisms. A relieved Cece thanks Amy and hugs her. Michael changes his mind and brings Amy to the museum where Danny died, explaining how he took Amy's place on a school field trip and should've checked Danny's pulse after he vomited, but didn't; Danny later died because of his heart condition. Amy apologizes for blaming Michael and being distant; Michael breaks down crying and Amy consoles him.
5	5	"He Ain't Heavy"	Marisol Adler	Hank Steinberg & Mark Bianculli	February 4, 2025	2.14
Before shadowing Sonya, Amy finds out from Jake that she told Sonya she shouldn't be a doctor. Amy and Sonya clash while treating Sam, the stem cell donor for his older brother, Leo, a cancer patient. Leo is upset by the toll the treatments have taken on Sam. While Amy understands the parents' perspective, Sonya is on Leo's side; his parents complain and Michael has to intervene. After Leo codes, Amy encourages the parents to listen to both their sons, like Sonya suggested. They agree to stop making Sam the donor, but convince Leo to keep fighting until they find another one. Amy apologizes to Sonya for her remarks. Jake treats Kayla, a bride who fainted at the altar. Jake asks Gina to consult, thinking Kayla wanted to leave her fiancé, but Gina says that's not the case. Jake discovers a tumor that was causing Kayla's anxiety spike. Kayla decides to get married before having surgery, which is a success. Jake confesses to Gina about his relationship with Amy. Michael and his new wife, Nora, are expecting a baby, which Amy doesn't remember. Michael remembers being terrified when Nora first told him. He later goes to Amy's home and tells her about Nora's pregnancy; she wishes him well.
6	6	"Once More, with Feeling"	Amanda Row	Katie Varney	February 11, 2025	2.28
Amy goes back to her old home to see if she gets any new memories. She bonds with Katie while she's there. Flashbacks reveal how Katie and Amy's relationship deteriorated after the divorce until Katie went back to live with Michael full-time. At the hospital, Amy and Jake try to figure out what is wrong with college student Chloe, who has a disorder that blocks all pain, but also has progressively worse symptoms throughout her body. Katie decides to move back in with Amy to help her out. Michael is reluctant after Amy hurt Katie, causing tension between him and Nora. Gina treats a hypochondriac patient, a board member's nephew, while TJ runs tests on him. Richard comes in to help with Chloe, but Amy figures out that Chloe has appendicitis and they're able to save her. Amy figures out that she and Jake were in a relationship after seeing the same energy drink mix from her house in his locker. Gina tells her to figure out what she wants now and Amy goes to Jake's place to start their relationship over.
7	7	"Secrets and Lies"	Russell Lee Fine	Judith McCreary	February 18, 2025	2.45
Richard's oldest son, Lucas, struggles with bipolar and schizotypal disorders and his episodes cause tension for the rest of the family. Gina has recommended admitting Lucas to an inpatient facility, but Richard is reluctant. Amy is paired up with Sonya to treat Ravi, the son of Sonya's father's business partner who raped her five years before. Seeing Sonya's traumatic reaction, Amy figures out what happened and decides to help Sonya get justice. They find another victim and go to Michael to get Ravi arrested with the evidence. Sonya thanks Amy and decides to go get help before coming back to work. TJ and Jake treat a patient, Cary, with cystic fibrosis and they confront his wife that her son isn't Cary's. When his wife tells him the truth, Cary admits he already knew, but still loves his son. Richard finally decides to send Lucas for treatment. He admits to his wife, Victoria, that Lucas' troubles caused him to accidentally kill a patient and Amy figured it out before the accident, but she doesn't remember now; if she does remember, Richard will lose his job. Jake and Amy study for her board exams, which she later re-takes.
8	8	"Man Plans"	Jono Oliver	Mark Bianculli	February 25, 2025	2.48
Amy notices an email titled "Dixon" with no recipient in her drafts and asks nurse Julie to help her figure out what it means. Michael sees Jake and Amy together and confronts them both, worried that Amy's future as a doctor could be in jeopardy. Amy follows Richard to treat Francine, who has increasingly erratic behavior and impulses. Flashbacks reveal how Richard and Amy's friendship deteriorated after Danny's death. Amy figures out that Francine has dementia and she, Richard, and Gina help Francine and her family process the diagnosis. Jake and nurse Liz treat Wes, who has a heart condition. He hopes to reconnect with his high school crush, but doesn't realize his best friend is in love with him. Julie, Liz, and Jake treat Wes while watching the love triangle play out. Jake tells Amy that he's in love with her and thinks they should wait to date until she's officially a doctor again. Richard confesses to Amy about Lucas' troubles; Amy comes clean to Richard about her relationship with Jake. Richard still recommends Amy's reinstatement to Michael. Katie and Gina celebrate with Amy after she finds out that she passed the boards and is officially a doctor again.
9	9	"What Goes Up..."	Nicole Rubio	Katie Varney	March 11, 2025	2.46
On Amy's first day after being re-certified a doctor, TJ asks her to examine his father, Randy, who has issues with his mobility. Flashbacks reveal how Amy saved TJ's life years before as a boy, inspiring him to become a doctor. Amy finds a lesion near Randy's spine and the surgeons think it needs to be cut out, which would cause Randy to not feel his lower extremities, but still be able to move them. Amy suggests another diagnosis that would not require surgery and preserve Randy's sensation. TJ doesn't want to give false hope, but Randy refuses to go through with the surgery and opts for Amy's method. After the treatment starts, Randy loses feeling in his body and TJ blames Amy for pushing the diagnosis. Julie tells Amy about Bill Dixon and Richard restricting the autopsy report. She finds out from pathologist Dr. Franco about the metoprolol. Jake and Sonya treat a mother who's worried about losing her daughter if she's hospitalized. Amy confronts Richard about Bill's case, but then he claims that she prescribed the metoprolol and it led to Bill's death. After TJ scolding her and hearing Richard's claim, Amy breaks down crying in front of Michael. He consoles her and they kiss.
10	10	"...Must Come Down"	Michael Goi	Barbie Kligman	March 18, 2025	2.38
A mass casualty event floods the hospital with patients after a suicidal man stops his car on train tracks. Gina figures out that he was her patient and feels guilty for not being able to help him. Nora sees texts from Amy on Michael's iPad and confronts Michael, who tells her the truth. On her way out, she runs into Amy and calls her out on it; Sonya overhears this. TJ tells Amy that his father has regained feeling, proving Amy's diagnosis was correct. Amy visits Bill Dixon's widow to apologize and finds out that Bill never took metoprolol. She realizes Richard and Liz gaslit her to make her think that she killed Bill instead of him. A flashback reveals Richard received a call about Lucas being arrested before Bill coded. Amy turns him in to Michael and the head of the board, Max. Richard is fired and has his license suspended. Sonya tells Jake about Amy and Michael being together, but he doesn't believe her. Jake goes back to the hospital and sees them together in Michael's office.

=== Season 2 (2025–26) ===
No. overall	No. in season	Title	Directed by	Written by	Original release date	U.S. viewers (millions)
11	1	"Her Heart"	Russell Lee Fine	Teleplay by : Hank Steinberg; Story by : Hank Steinberg & Barbie Kligman	September 14, 2025	4.14
Amy's past comes to haunt her when a former patient of hers, Rosie, is back and needs a heart transplant. Amy notices a spot on Rosie's lung and says there is a chance the transplant can't happen. Rosie's father, Alex, recognizes Amy and gets mad at her because she refused to give one for Rosie six years ago. Because of her memory loss, she has no recollection of him. Jake realizes Alex has a gun and tries to stop him. TJ intervenes but ends up getting shot in the leg and is rushed into surgery. Alex holds Amy, Sonya and nurse Julie hostage while trying to treat Rosie, and the hospital is put on lockdown. There is a heart waiting for Rosie, and Michael lies to the United Network for Organ Sharing so they can go forward with the transplant. Amy tries to remember why she made the decision not to approve of the heart transplant years ago. Regarding her kiss to Michael, it is revealed that he pushed her away, and as he does, Amy sees Jake. Meanwhile, Nora goes into labor and has a baby boy, named Simon. Amy asks Gina to help get her memory back.
12	2	"Delusions of Grandeur"	Jono Oliver	Teleplay by : Barbie Kligman; Story by : Barbie Kligman & Hank Steinberg	September 30, 2025	2.40
A pregnant woman who is in a commune and has no doctor travels four hours to Westside to check on the baby. Since there aren't any available obstetricians, Amy is asked to check on the woman. When she does an ultrasound, Amy discovers that the woman isn't pregnant but has a tumor. She asks Gina how to deal with this. Gina tells her to lie, or the woman will bolt if she finds out she isn't pregnant. Michael has to go on paternity leave earlier than he planned to let the flames die down after he put the hospital at risk for ignoring UNOS. Amy is surprised by her friend and mentor, Dr. Joan Ridley, who is at the hospital doing rounds with med students. After meeting with Joan, Amy gets some memories back. Joan helps Jake and Sonya with their patient. Michael offers Joan the position of Chief of Internal Medicine. Amy and Jake have broken up, and he asks her if she would go back to Michael if Nora and the baby weren't in the picture. She doesn't say anything. Sonya asks Jake if he wants to go out for drinks. First appearance of: Dr. Joan Ridley.
13	3	"New Blood"	Nicole Rubio	Katie Varney	October 7, 2025	2.38
Amy continues with her TMS treatment to try to get some memories back, but it leaves her with some side effects. Amy's patient, Claire Pinto, who has MS and hepatitis, needs to get to Mexico, or she'll be kicked out of the stem cell trial she is in to treat her MS. They won't let her leave because it would put the hospital at risk. Later, Amy walks in and sees that Claire was able to get the injections flown in from Mexico. A nurse friend of hers was going to give her the injection, but Amy did it because she was afraid the friend might accidentally hurt her. TJ helps with a wounded veteran. Amy tells Jake that he still loves her, and kisses him, but he pulls away before things go too far. Joan tasks Jake with hiring an intern to fill in while TJ is recovering. Joan finds out what happened with Amy's patient and accuses her of taking advantage of their friendship. She tells her that she will review her past cases. Joan will also be giving her staff a review in two months. Jake declines Sonya's offer to go a Timberwolves game.
14	4	"Something to Prove"	Jono Oliver	Carol Barbee	October 14, 2025	2.14
College student, Seth, suddenly goes blind, and Amy, Jake and Hannah, the new intern, see how to treat him. Hannah's dad, Dr. Brian Clark, used to work under Amy. Joan tells Jake to end whatever his relationship with Amy is. Elsewhere, Sonya has a patient whose ex-husband is still his medical proxy, but his current partner doesn't like how he is the one who has to make a tough decision. Gina visits the memorial of her former patient, who tried to commit suicide on the train tracks. Back to Seth, it turns out he has blood clots in his eyes and was taking a high dosage of a Viagra knockoff, which led to the blindness. They find a treatment to try to correct his blindness, which works. Amy has memory seizures throughout the day. There are flashbacks to when Amy worked with Dr. Clark and why he resigned from the hospital. Joan has a blood condition that can turn into leukemia. Amy goes out for drinks with the other interns, and Sonya asks if she said something to Jake, since he declined her offer of going to a basketball game. Amy says yes and tells her that she isn't going anywhere.
15	5	"Tightrope"	Nicole Rubio	Laura Valdivia	October 21, 2025	2.19
After having memory seizures of a snow globe, Amy tries to figure out the meaning of it. Jake asks Joan if he and Amy can work on separate cases. Jake's patient, Jess, had a vasovagal event. She ends up falling asleep and starts talking truthfully. They put her in a sleep study. She has temporal lobe epilepsy. Amy's patient, Sal, has trouble with his blood sugar and his wife ends up collapsing while chastising him for overeating. She is malnourished. Chairman of the Board, Max, wants Michael to convince Sonya's dad to donate $10 million to the hospital. Jess's sister, Casey flirts with Jake. The head of HR tells Hannah that her dad left the hospital after he filed a report against Amy.
16	6	"Saints and Sinners"	Russell Lee Fine	David Renaud	November 4, 2025	2.04
Sonya is in charge for the day while Dr. Ridley is at a conference, and TJ returns to work. He volunteers to treat Malcolm, a sick prisoner. Malcolm poisoned himself as a way to get to the hospital to see if he could see his mother, who is dying of cancer. But she doesn't want to see him. The hospital chaplain starts bleeding from his eyes while visiting a patient. Amy tells Chaplain O'Leary he has advanced vasculitis, and it's hard to cure. UNOS has suspended the hospital's transplant program after they lied to them during the hostage situation. Feeling like the transplant board is throwing him under the bus, Michael tells him they will receive his resignation at the end of the day. Jake faked a test for Rosie, who was supposed to get the heart to save Michael. Hannah steals information from Amy's laptop with a USB drive, and uses it to log into Amy's account. Jake spent the night with Casey. Later that evening while seeing a band with her, he leaves when Amy texts him, thanking him for saving Michael.
17	7	"What I Did For Love"	So Yong Kim	Barbie Kligman & Katie Varney	November 11, 2025	2.30
A patient of Gina's, Kim, is admitted to the hospital after being pushed out of a window by her husband, Ray. This is the second time she has been to the ER with an injury. She lies to the detective that he is abusing her because she is afraid of him. They arrange for her to go to a safe house, but their plan is foiled. The next day, Kim asks Gina to rescue her from her home. Ray shows up and attacks Gina. The police arrive and arrest Ray. Sonya and TJ's patient Ben, a social media influencer, learns he never had cancer. Hannah and her brother, Charlie, mess with Amy's emails and her prescriptions to make her look bad, nearly killing a patient. Joan won't let Amy practice for a while due to her mistakes and assigned her a new neurologist to assess her. Michael is on thin ice with the board.
18	8	"He Loved You"	Marisol Adler	David Foster	November 18, 2025	2.23
Jake gets news that his dad died and starts to act irrationally about his patient, Dante. Katie is worried about Amy since things aren't going well with her mom's neuropathy tests. She gets new memories, including one of Danny. She doesn't take the medicine to help with the side effects of the treatment so she can retain memories of him. Hannah and Charlie listen to Amy's memory recovery sessions and try to use that to get her. TJ's patient, Peter, tries to convince him that he has kidney stones, but he has testicular torsion. Amy passes out while trying to figure out who the man in her memories is. Joan, Michael and Amy's new doctor make her take the medication. There is a flashback of Amy meeting Jake's dad.
19	9	"Kaddish"	Russell Lee Fine	Hank Steinberg	November 25, 2025	2.31
Staff from the hospital come to support Jake at his father's funeral. Afterwards, at the reception, Hannah tries to fish for information about Jake and Amy's relationship. Using Amy's email, Charlie sends an email containing the recordings from her TMS treatments to Nora. She finds out about Amy and Michael's kiss in the elevator and hears Amy wondering if he still loves Nora. Amy finds out about this and figures out someone is out to get her. In March 2020, Jake thought about taking a job at Johns Hopkins. But after he and Amy treated a patient who had Covid, he decided to stay. Back in the present, Nora leaves Michael and takes Simon with her, and Jake also receives the recording. He doesn't care, and he and Amy get back together. Hannah wants Charlie to stop, but he doesn't. Using AI, he begins to create deepfakes using Amy's voice.
20	10	"Chief"	Seith Mann	Jake Gillman	January 6, 2026	2.38
A man with no identification is dropped off at the hospital. Using clues, Amy finds out that his name is Tim, he is married, and he has been missing for seven years. Jake and TJ's patient, Shannon, and Hannah's patient, Chris, are showing the same symptoms as Tim. Turns out that Shannon and Chris know each other. They snuck out to an abandoned house under construction, where they found an injured and homeless Tim. Chris was the one who dropped him off. TJ goes to find out if something at the house made them sick and discovers they have copper sulfate exposure. Chris slips into Code Blue, and after trying to revive him for almost 40 minutes, he doesn't make it. Amy, who was under Sonya's supervision for the day, lashes out at her for not doing the test for Tim that could have saved Chris. Amy tells Joan that she wants to be considered for chief resident. Katie hears a recording of "Amy" saying that Danny was her favorite child. Charlie is shocked when Hannah tells him about Chris' death, and Hannah feels guilty for letting their revenge kill someone.
21	11	"Family Matters"	Scott Wolf	Andre Jackson	January 13, 2026	2.38
Hannah tells Charlie to leave her place the morning after Chris' death. Amy and Hannah treat Albert, an elderly patient who collapsed, but they quickly discover a more sinister plot involving his daughter, son, and nurse. When checking school kids for scoliosis, TJ comes across Noah, who has strep throat that hasn't been treated. While treating Noah, Sonya tries to help his sister Alyssa, a bright, young woman who gave up going to college to look after her siblings after their parents died. The FBI is called in to investigate the hospital hack. Kate confronts Gina about the recording she heard, but Gina tells her that it was a deep fake, which helps the FBI find Charlie's voice from the original recording. Amy realizes the man she sees in her memories of the snow globe is Brian Clark. Hannah walks into her apartment and sees that Charlie overdosed.
22	12	"Inquisition"	David Petrarca	Hank Steinberg	January 20, 2026	2.46
The FBI and medical board investigate the hacking while Amy and her team fight to reverse Charlie's overdose. The board is trying to scapegoat Amy over this. Doctors and nurses are being interviewed about's Amy's behavior toward Brian. Amy asks around to help defend her, including TJ's dad. Since he is a police officer and he owes her one for saving his life months ago, she wants him to dig up information on the Clarks. Richard is one of the people called in to be asked about Amy. Charlie is rushed into surgery. When Amy confronts Hannah, she notices Charlie's hand and figures out his symptoms are from SIADH, not the overdose. Hannah's mom saves Amy by telling the investigator the truth about Brian. Hannah has been unmasked as the saboteur, and Charlie is responsible for Chris's death. By day's end, Hannah was being removed from the hospital by police. Michael and Max argue about Amy. Michael says she's the hospital's best doctor, while Max says she is a liability.
23	13	"Fare Well"	Lee Friedlander	David Renaud	January 27, 2026	2.63
Amy and Sonya are up for Chief Resident, and Michael's parents are in town visiting. Sonya's patient, Jayla, has had stomach pain for six years. Sonya notices her foot has turned black, and she checks it out. Jayla has porphyria which has been causing the stomach pain. Amy's patient, Troy, who is a paraplegic, has permanent lung damage and will have to be on a ventilator someday. He is a legislator and needs to get to City Hall to help pass a bill that he sponsored. Whenever he sits up, he has a hard time breathing. Amy remembers a drug that she once gave to a patient and thinks it might work for him so he will be able to get down to City Hall. Though the drug will make him have to be on a ventilator a lot sooner. He was able to get the bill passed, but he had to be put on a ventilator the next day. Michael admits to his dad that he doesn't love Nora, not the way she needs to be. It all changed after Amy's accident. Overhearing this, Katie freaks out. Michael takes her over to Amy's where she has a panic attack.
24	14	"When You Know, You Know"	Kristin Lehman	Carol Barbee & Barbie Kligman	February 3, 2026	2.70
During a convenience store robbery, a pregnant woman, Andi, gets her leg cut by a sunglass stand. She is admitted to the hospital and goes into labor four weeks early. After giving birth, Andi has a brain aneurysm and dies due to high blood pressure raised from the robbery and delivery. At first, after a blood test, it is revealed that Andi's boyfriend, Andy, isn't the baby's father. Amy figures out that Andy is a chimera and is the baby's father. TJ treats nurse Julie, who has a benign tumor. Amy runs into Jake's ex-wife at the hospital. Rachel tells Jake that she found a lump and went in for a mammogram. Katie starts talking to a therapist to help with her panic attacks. While out for drinks, TJ and Sonya start to figure out something is wrong with Joan. Amy has a flashback and figures out that Michael cheated on her when they were married. He confirms that he cheated on her with Nora.
25	15	"Trust"	Russell Lee Fine	Laura Valdivia	February 10, 2026	2.54
Poker player Bobby Ho feels that something is wrong with him when he flipped a table during a game. Tests say he is fine, but while playing poker, Gina notices his eyes are dilated. Diane, a recovering alcoholic with liver problems, needs a liver transplant. Her granddaughter, Liz, wants to be her donor regardless of the risks and her grandmother's disapproval. Rachel tells Jake not to tell anybody about her health issues. Joan is out again, leaving TJ and Sonya curious. Katie has another panic attack, and Amy tells her about the memory she had about Michael cheating on her. Michael tells Amy that he ended things with Nora the day after she moved out and didn't get back with Nora until two years later. Gina thinks if she has a benign growth removed from Bobby, it will trick him into start playing poker well again, which it does. Sonya finds syringes in Joan's desk and finds out she has an autoimmune disease. Richard goes to get his job back and gets it because he has leverage against Amy.
26	16	"The Best We Can Do"	Marcus Stokes	Nick Arciero	March 3, 2026	2.11
It's Richard's first day back and Amy warns him, if he does anything wrong, she is going to take him down. She and TJ's patient is a malpractice lawyer. Sonya and TJ are concerned about Joan performing surgery with her illness. They want Jake to talk to her about it.
27	17	"Good Hands"	Marisol Adler	Katie Varney	March 10, 2026	2.36
Joan tells Amy she has MDS, and Jake wants Amy to tell Michael about Joan. Richard and TJ debate over a treatment for a patient who has small cell lung cancer. Amy goes through TMS treatments to regain memories of Joan, and they argue about her diagnosis. Michael and Nora go through mediation, Rachel learns that she doesn't have cancer, and Joan performs a risky surgery on her friend. Amy is able to get Joan's son, Ethan, to come see her. Joan tells the staff that she has MDS and will be resigning.
28	18	"Orientation"	Russell Lee Fine	David Foster	March 24, 2026	2.22
On the way to take Katie to her college orientation in Chicago, Katie finds out that her mom is dating Jake. Amy, Katie, and Michael take a side trip to a place where they used to camp. They find an unconscious man, Cody, lying on the ground who is about to freeze. While Katie goes to get help, Amy and Michael help him. They realize Cody is not alone, and Michael goes to find his girlfriend, Rina. The two crashed their snowmobiles. She is injured and becomes hypothermic. The EMTs arrive and take them to the hospital. Amy thinks about her past with Michael. The next evening Jake asks Amy if he can come over. She declines, saying she is tired.
29	19	"Next"	Matt Smukler	Carol Barbee	March 31, 2026	2.20
Joan prepares for her final days working at Westside. Sixteen-year-old Hayley comes in with abdominal pains. TJ looks into checking on a kid named Walter who was dropped off at the hospital by his group home counselor. He has rheumatoid arthritis. Joan and Michael look for her replacement. Hayley finds out she has an ectopic pregnancy and doesn't want her mom Jocelyn to know, so she only tells her father Carl. There is hostility between Jake and Amy when they disagree about her treatment and if her mom should know what's wrong with her. TJ gets into the surgical residency. Gina gets close to Walter, and when she can't get in touch with his social worker, she makes a medical decision for him. Michael suggests to Joan that he replace her, which she accepts. Amy and Sonya become co-chief residents.
30	20	"The Big Chair"	Russell Lee Fine	Joe Walsh	April 7, 2026	2.22
Joan is rushed to the hospital with respiratory failure, and she finds out that she now has full-blown leukemia. Gina checks on Walter, who needs surgery. Even though Joan's cultures came back negative, Amy thinks there is still something wrong with her. She gets another blood test done behind Richard's back, and it turns out she has a Candida organ infection. Walter needs another surgery, and Joan starts seizing. Michael won't listen to what Liz has to say about Richard. Joan doesn't have leukemia but has a parasite in her liver.
31	21	"Stuck"	Bethany Rooney	Katie Varney	April 14, 2026	2.12
The sixth floor is put on lockdown after Richard's patient, George, died of a variant of Marburg. Liz, Richard, Gina, and Nurse Lucy were in the room with him. Before this, Liz made an HR complaint against Richard related to the Bill Dixon case. Dr. Ben Grant, who is at Westside visiting his sister, helps out with the lockdown. He recognizes Amy from a conference, but she can't remember him. Lucy, Richard, and Liz all test positive, with Lucy dying soon after. The lockdown causes Amy to have seizure flashes of the COVID lockdown. Amy takes medication to help. Noticing a rapid replication rate, the doctors come up with a cocktail to counter the virus. Richard seems to respond well to the drug, but later codes. While trying to help him, Amy gets stuck with an infected needle due to the medication making her lose focus. First appearance of: Dr. Ben Grant.
32	22	"Happy Birthday"	Russell Lee Fine	Barbie Kligman	April 14, 2026	2.12
Amy is rushed to get tested and is put into isolation. She tests positive. By day four, thirteen are infected and six are dead. Gina is still negative and finds out that she has a genetic mutation that blocks the variant. Though she doesn't have any antibodies, Richard does, and the doctors know now where to look to find the antibody and get a cure. When Richard is finally cured, Michael, Joan and Sonya plan to use his antibodies to create a cure, but because he's weak, they can only come up with three doses. Names are put in a hat to see who are the three to receive it. Amy starts to bleed internally and goes into surgery. Joan assists Ben & TJ with the surgery. Amy makes it through, as well as Liz and Richard. It is revealed that Ben and Amy had an affair at the medical conference.

=== Season 3 (2026) ===
No. overall	No. in season	Title	Directed by	Written by	Original release date	U.S. viewers (millions)
33	1	"Wherefore Art Thou"	Russell Lee Fine	Hank Steinberg	September 22, 2026	N/A
Amy and Sonya prepare for their first day as co-chief residents. Joan has passed away, Richard moved to Eastside Hospital, and Jake starts his fellowship in cardiology. Amy and her interns, Ruth Chen and Graham Barker, check on high school student Torey, who is having seizures. Sonya and her interns, Nikki De Silva and Kyle Ferguson, are treating Torey's drama teacher, Mr. Galvin, who has the same symptoms as her. More students have the same symptoms as them, and Amy figures out they have conversion disorder. Seeing Torey having the seizure triggered it. Dr. Ben Grant tries to convince the board to hire him as chief of surgery. Amy gets flashbacks to the day of her accident. They include her telling Jake that she loves him and ignoring a call from Ben. Amy and Jake have also broken up again.
34	2	"Ready or Not"	Bethany Rooney	Teleplay by : Barbie Kligman; Story by : Ashley Michel Hoban	September 29, 2026	N/A
A family who was in a car accident after hitting a deer is admitted to the hospital. This triggers Amy to remember the night of her accident. The dad, Anthony, was impaled by the deer's antlers, but they have to stop surgery on him after Amy discovers his Troponins BNP and lactate are way off. Ben wants to proceed with the surgery anyway, but Amy tells him he can't because Anthony is in heart failure and she has to fix it first. He gives her four hours, or he'll die in the ICU. When the mom, Jen, comes to, she doesn't recognize her son, Theo. Gina and Michael try to figure out what is causing Jen's amnesia. Amy figures out that Anthony has capillary leak syndrome and how to proceed with the surgery. The daughter, Harper, is in critical condition and also needs surgery. When Jen's fever keeps rising, Gina figures out that she was infected by the deer's blood. Ben tells Amy that they hooked up after the medical conference four years earlier. Jake has gotten back together with Rachel. When Max warns Michael not to give Amy any leeway like he used to, Michael tells him he will let her go if she jeopardizes the hospital.
35	3	"I Know What I Want"	Marcus Stokes	Heather Mitchell	October 6, 2026	N/A
Sonya's patient, Adam, is a drug addict and is in liver failure. Amy and Jake team up to help 74-year-old Tabby, who is in a polyamorous relationship. She has gonorrhea, which caused her heart palpitations and damage to her heart. She opts to have surgery to replace a valve so she can still have sex, angering her husband. Meanwhile, Adam has a blood vessel in his stomach that ruptured. It was caused by the kratom he has been taking. Gina learns that her former patient, Walter, has a family who wants to adopt him. She wants to make sure they are a right fit for Walter because of his chronic health issues. Adam turns himself in for breaking into his parent's home as a way to get clean. Gina tells her wife that she wants a child, and Sonya takes a pregnancy test. Jake tells Amy that he is back together with Rachel, and she tells him that she had a memory of him saying that he would never get back with her.
36	4	"Great Expectations"	Russell Lee Fine	Matthew Libby	October 13, 2026	N/A
Sonya confides in Amy about her pregnancy test. Jake is assigned to clinic duty, and finds a possible case of negligence against a surgeon. Amy's former patient, Cece ("One Small Step"), brings in her ex-wife, Bonnie, to be examined by Amy after her inoperable tumor suddenly causes numbness. Ben and Amy argue about the best treatment plan, forcing Michael to mediate. Sonya notices her intern, Claire, is distracted by various phone calls while they help out with Jake's patient. Gina and her wife, Wendy, see a fertility specialist about having a child, and get some surprising results.
37	5	"S.O.S"	Kelli Williams	Ashley Michel Hoban	October 20, 2026	N/A
Amy doesn't know what's wrong with her patient, Roxie when all her tests come back clear. When it is brought up if Roxie had the measles, her uncle says she was exposed to it as a baby. Nikki wonders if it's SSPE. Amy gets on to her for jumping the gun on a diagnosis, especially since SSPE is fatal. Michael suggests that Roxie could have toxoplasmosis, which comes from cats. That test comes back negative, so there is a 50/50 chance it's SSPE. All of this triggers memories of when Danny died. Michael is afraid those memories will affect her job. Sonya's patient, Mason, is obsessed with wanting good looks to impress women, but his actions lead to life-changing consequences. Later in the day, Amy also gets on to Graham because he passed his assignments on to Kyle. Roxie's test results come back, and it's not good.
38	6	"Facade"	David Katzenberg	Justin Boyd	November 3, 2026	TBD
A woman who fell on the train tracks is revealed to be in witness protection, but her identity is blown when a video of her falling goes viral. The woman, Sofia, used to be a drug mule. To keep her safe, only a few know about her, and she needs to be transported to another hospital. Sofia has a capsule full of cocaine inside her that needs to be extracted. She has to make a tough decision about her love life regarding her boyfriend's safety. Graham's stepmother, Nina, stops by the hospital for a donor's luncheon, and Amy doesn't remember meeting her. A year earlier, before her accident, Amy tried to convince her to donate her money to a clinic for underprivileged women instead of going towards a plastic surgery wing at the hospital. Nina also blackmailed Amy into hiring Graham once he graduated because she knew Amy was involved with Ben's clinical trial. TJ meets Sonya's father, and convinces him to fund Ben's trial.
39	7	"Heroic Measures"	Shana Stein	Nick Arciero	November 10, 2026	TBD
After Amy's latest scans, her memory seizures could return, so Michael doesn't want her to perform any procedures. Ben begins his clinical trials in which patients will receive artificial hearts. Based on recent brain activity, Gina thinks her coma patient, Rob, could be coming out of his unresponsive state. Amy discovers that he is having a brain aneurysm. Arguments arise between the two over whether Rob should be treated, as Amy believes he has no quality of life. Michael gives the go-ahead for the procedure to treat Rob. Afterwards, Rob wakes up from his coma, but unfortunately the joy doesn't last. Grant and Nina try to figure out how to go after Amy after she assigned Grant grunt work.
40	8	"Operation"	Randy Zisk	Teresa Tuan	November 17, 2026	TBD
The first patient to receive an artificial heart in Ben's clinical trial is underway. Amy's patient, Holly, a single mother is facing the consequences of vaping. Graham offers to pay for her hospital bill. To get a head start on her pre-med requirements, Katie is in town observing her mother. Michael doesn't want her to know about her mother's latest health conditions. One of Ben's clinical trial participants awaiting treatment suffered a stroke, disqualifying him. Amy identifies the root cause of Holly's symptoms and diagnoses her with sarcoidosis. Amy encourages Holly's ex, Keith to be there for Holly and their daughter. When Graham continues insisting on seeing patients on his own, Amy suspends his rotations for a week. Flashbacks reveal Amy's childhood when her father left her mother. Amy reveals to Katie that he is still alive after previously saying to her that he had died.

== Production ==
=== Development ===
On February 16, 2023, Fox announced that it was developing an adaptation of Doc – Nelle tue mani, a series created by Francesco Arlanch and Viola Rispoli for Italian channel Rai 1. On April 3, 2023, it was announced that the adaptation had been picked up for a full series, created by Barbie Kligman, who is also credited as an executive producer alongside Hank Steinberg and Erwin Stoff. Production companies involved are 3 Arts Entertainment, Fox Entertainment, and Sony Pictures Television. Although initially scheduled for the 2023–24 season, the series was moved to the 2024–25 season due to production delays related to the 2023 Hollywood labor disputes. On February 26, 2025, Fox renewed the series for a 22-episode second season, making it the first drama on the network to receive a 22-episode season order since The Resident during the 2021–22 season. On March 9, 2026, Fox renewed the series for a third season consisting of 22 episodes.

=== Casting ===
On December 19, 2023, Molly Parker was cast in the lead role. On March 4, 2024, Omar Metwally, Amirah Vann, Jon-Michael Ecker and Anya Banerjee were announced as series regulars, and Scott Wolf and Patrick Walker were set to recur in the series. On May 28, 2025, Walker and Charlotte Fountain-Jardim were promoted to series regulars for the second season. On June 10, 2025, Felicity Huffman joined the cast as a new series regular for the second season. On August 13, 2025, Emma Pfitzer Price was cast in a recurring capacity for the second season. On March 10, 2026, Blair Underwood was cast as a series regular for the third season. On August 25, 2026, Barrett Carnahan, Raffa Virago, Cecilia Lee and Kolton Stewart were cast in recurring capacities for the third season.

=== Filming ===
Production started in March 2024 in both Toronto, and Oakville, Ontario, Canada. Filming for the second season began on June 6, 2025 and concluded on April 3, 2026. Filming for the third season started on June 29, 2026 and is scheduled to conclude April 2, 2027.

== Broadcast ==
Doc premiered on Fox on January 7, 2025, and streaming on Hulu the next day. In Canada, the series airs on Global and is available to stream on StackTV.

The second season premiered on September 14, 2025. The third season premiered on September 22, 2026.

== Reception ==
=== Critical response ===
For the first season the review aggregator website Rotten Tomatoes reported a 44% approval rating with an average rating of 4.1/10, based on 9 critic reviews. Metacritic, which uses a weighted average, assigned a score of 58 out of 100 based on 5 critics, indicating "mixed or average" reviews.

=== Ratings ===
Viewership and ratings per season of Doc
Season	Timeslot (ET)	Episodes	First aired		Last aired		TV season	Viewership rank	Avg. viewers (millions)	18–49 rank	Avg. 18–49 rating
Season	Timeslot (ET)	Episodes	Date	Viewers (millions)	Date	Viewers (millions)	TV season	Viewership rank	Avg. viewers (millions)	18–49 rank	Avg. 18–49 rating
1	Tuesday 9:00 p.m.	10	January 7, 2025	2.22	March 18, 2025	2.38	2024–25	TBD	7.62	TBD	TBD
2	Sunday 8:00 p.m. (1); Tuesday 9:00 p.m. (2–22)	22	September 14, 2025	4.14	April 14, 2026	2.12	2025–26	TBD	TBD	TBD	TBD
3	Tuesday 9:00 p.m.	22	September 22, 2026	TBD	TBA	TBD	2026–27	TBD	TBD	TBD	TBD

==== Season 1 ====
Viewership and ratings per episode of Doc
No.	Title	Air date	Rating/share (18–49)	Viewers (millions)	DVR (18–49)	DVR viewers (millions)	Total (18–49)	Total viewers (millions)	Ref.
1	"If at First You Don't Succeed..."	January 7, 2025	0.2/2	2.22	0.1	1.99	0.3	4.16	
2	"Try Try Again"	January 14, 2025	0.3/3	2.52	0.2	2.38	0.4	4.90	
3	"Day One"	January 21, 2025	0.2/3	2.33	0.1	2.36	0.4	4.69	
4	"One Small Step"	January 28, 2025	0.2/3	2.08	0.2	2.41	0.4	4.57	
5	"He Ain't Heavy"	February 4, 2025	0.2/3	2.14	0.2	2.28	0.4	4.42	
6	"Once More, with Feeling"	February 11, 2025	0.3/3	2.28	0.1	2.17	0.4	4.44	
7	"Secrets and Lies"	February 18, 2025	0.3/4	2.45	0.2	2.31	0.5	4.76	
8	"Man Plans"	February 25, 2025	0.3/4	2.48	0.2	2.11	0.4	4.59	
9	"What Goes Up..."	March 11, 2025	0.2/3	2.46	0.2	2.21	0.4	4.67	
10	"...Must Come Down"	March 18, 2025	0.3/4	2.38	0.1	2.16	0.4	4.54	

==== Season 2 ====
Viewership and ratings per episode of Doc
No.	Title	Air date	Rating/share (18–49)	Viewers (millions)	DVR (18–49)	DVR viewers (millions)	Total (18–49)	Total viewers (millions)	Ref.
1	"Her Heart"	September 14, 2025	0.8/8	4.14	0.1	1.54	0.9	5.68	
2	"Delusions of Grandeur"	September 30, 2025	0.2/2	2.40	0.2	1.85	0.3	4.25	
3	"New Blood"	October 7, 2025	0.2/3	2.38	TBD	TBD	TBD	TBD	
4	"Something to Prove"	October 14, 2025	0.2/2	2.14	0.2	1.93	0.3	4.07	
5	"Tightrope"	October 21, 2025	0.2/2	2.19	0.1	1.9	0.3	4.09	
6	"Saints and Sinners"	November 4, 2025	0.2/2	2.04	0.1	1.82	0.3	3.87	
7	"What I Did For Love"	November 11, 2025	0.2/2	2.30	TBD	TBD	TBD	TBD	
8	"He Loved You"	November 18, 2025	0.2/2	2.23	TBD	TBD	TBD	TBD	
9	"Kaddish"	November 25, 2025	0.2/2	2.31	TBD	TBD	TBD	TBD	
10	"Chief"	January 6, 2026	0.2/4	2.38	TBD	TBD	TBD	TBD	
11	"Family Matters"	January 13, 2026	0.2/3	2.38	TBD	TBD	TBD	TBD	
12	"Inquisition"	January 20, 2026	0.2/2	2.46	TBD	TBD	TBD	TBD	
13	"Fare Well"	January 27, 2026	0.2/3	2.63	TBD	TBD	TBD	TBD	
14	"When You Know, You Know"	February 3, 2026	0.2/3	2.70	TBD	TBD	TBD	TBD	
15	"Trust"	February 10, 2026	0.2/2	2.54	TBD	TBD	TBD	TBD	
16	"The Best We Can Do"	March 3, 2026	0.2/3	2.11	TBD	TBD	TBD	TBD	
17	"Good Hands"	March 10, 2026	0.2/3	2.36	TBD	TBD	TBD	TBD	
18	"Orientation"	March 24, 2026	0.2/2	2.22	TBD	TBD	TBD	TBD	
19	"Next"	March 31, 2026	0.1/2	2.20	TBD	TBD	TBD	TBD	
20	"The Big Chair"	April 7, 2026	0.2/2	2.22	TBD	TBD	TBD	TBD	
21	"Stuck"	April 14, 2026	0.1/2	2.12	TBD	TBD	TBD	TBD	
22	"Happy Birthday"	April 14, 2026	0.1/2	2.12	TBD	TBD	TBD	TBD	
