= 2026 Poinsettia Bowl =

Postseason college football bowl game

2026 SDCCU Poinsettia Bowl
- 13th Poinsettia Bowl
- Date: December 23, 2026
- Season: 2026
- Stadium: Snapdragon Stadium
- Location: San Diego, California, US

United States TV coverage
- Network: The CW
- Announcers: Rick Allen (play-by-play), Will Blackmon (analyst), and Michael Bumpus (sideline)

The 2026 Poinsettia Bowl is an American college football bowl game that is scheduled to be played on December 23, 2026, at Snapdragon Stadium located in San Diego, California. The 13th edition of the Poinsettia Bowl will be one of the 2026–27 bowl games concluding the 2026 FBS football season. This will be the first Poinsettia Bowl to be played in a decade, as the bowl went on hiatus following its 2016 edition. Sponsored by the San Diego County Credit Union, the game is officially known at the SDCCU Poinsettia Bowl.

== See also ==
- 2026 Holiday Bowl (December), contested at the same venue five days later
