= Legends (miniseries) =

Upcoming American miniseries

- Genre: Metafiction; Thriller
- Created by: Charlie Hunnam; Jonathan Groff
- Showrunner: Jonathan Groff
- Starring: Charlie Hunnam; Ron Perlman; Katey Sagal; Maggie Siff; Mark Boone Junior; Tommy Flanagan; Kim Coates; Theo Rossi
- Country of origin: United States
- Original language: English

Production
- Executive producers: Charlie Hunnam; Jonathan Groff; Rob Mac; Nicholas Frenkel; Jackie Cohn
- Production companies: More Better Productions; RGC Productions; 20th Television; FXP

Original release
- Network: FX; FX on Hulu

Legends is an upcoming American metafictional thriller miniseries created by Charlie Hunnam and Jonathan Groff and starring Hunnam, Ron Perlman, Katey Sagal, Maggie Siff, Mark Boone Junior, Tommy Flanagan, Kim Coates, and Theo Rossi for FX.

== Premise ==
When the cast of Sons of Anarchy reunites at a fan convention after more than a decade, the line between life and art blurs as the fractured brotherhood finds itself up against a real-world threat more dangerous than anything they ever faced in their show.

== Cast ==
- Charlie Hunnam as himself
- Ron Perlman as himself
- Katey Sagal as herself
- Maggie Siff as herself
- Mark Boone Junior as himself
- Tommy Flanagan as himself
- Kim Coates as himself
- Theo Rossi as himself

== Production ==
=== Development ===
On August 19, 2026, it was reported that FX had given a series order to a metafictional thriller titled Legends from co-creators Charlie Hunnam and Jonathan Groff, whom the latter would be the showrunner, with Hunnam and Groff executive producing alongside Rob Mac, Nicholas Frenkel, and Jackie Cohn of More Better Productions. 20th Television and FX Productions will be producing the series.

In September 2026, Hunham stated that he developed the idea of the series with Groff as a love letter to Sons of Anarchy, which he starred as Jax Teller.

=== Casting ===
Alongside the series order, it was also announced that Hunnam would star alongside fellow Sons of Anarchy cast members Ron Perlman, Katey Sagal, Maggie Siff, Mark Boone Junior, Tommy Flanagan, Kim Coates, and Theo Rossi, all of which will play fictional versions of themselves.
