= NCIS: New York =

American police procedural television series

- Genre: Police procedural; Drama
- Based on: NCIS by Donald P. Bellisario & Don McGill
- Developed by: R. Scott Gemmill; Byron Balasco
- Starring: LL Cool J; Scott Caan; Jennifer Beals; Jacqueline Byers; Shane Harper; Devin Druid
- Country of origin: United States
- Original language: English
- No. of seasons: 1
- No. of episodes: 6

Production
- Executive producers: Byron Balasco; Jason Barrett; LL Cool J; Paris Barclay; R. Scott Gemmill
- Production location: New York
- Editor: Geofrey Hildrew
- Running time: 44–45 minutes
- Production companies: LL Cool J Incorporated; Balasco Pictures; R. Scott Gemmill Productions; CBS Studios

Original release
- Network: CBS
- Release: October 6, 2026 – present

Related
- JAG; Hawaii Five-0; NCIS; NCIS: Los Angeles; NCIS: New Orleans; NCIS: Hawaiʻi; NCIS: Origins; NCIS: Sydney; NCIS: Tony & Ziva

NCIS: New York is an American police procedural action crime drama television series developed by R. Scott Gemmill and Byron Balasco which premiered on October 6, 2026 on CBS. A spin-off of NCIS, the series features LL Cool J reprising his character of Sam Hanna from NCIS: Los Angeles, leading a team of the Naval Criminal Investigative Service based in New York City.

== Premise ==
Sam Hanna (LL Cool J) – a former Special Agent of the Office of Special Projects in Los Angeles – returns to his hometown of New York City to lead a team of NCIS alongside a "roguish" partner, Nick Schaeffer (Scott Caan).

== Cast ==
=== Main ===
- LL Cool J as Sam Hanna, a Naval Criminal Investigative Service (NCIS) Senior Special Agent, a former Navy SEAL, and former second-in-command of the Office of Special Projects.
- Scott Caan as Nick Schaeffer, a roguish NCIS Special Agent and Hanna's new partner.
- Jennifer Beals as Robyn Wells, the Assistant Special Agent-in-Charge (ASAC) and the director of the Naval Criminal Investigative Service (NCIS) New York field office.
- Jacqueline Byers as Addison "Addy" Ross, an NCIS Special Agent.
- Shane Harper as Wyatt Sellers, an NCIS Special Agent.
- Devin Druid as Sean Sullivan, an NCIS Technical Operator.

=== Guest ===
- Sharon Leal as Tamara, Hanna's ex-lover.

=== Crossover ===
- Brian Dietzen as Dr. Jimmy Palmer

== Episodes ==
No.	Title	Directed by	Written by	Original release date	U.S. viewers (millions)
1	"Pilot"	Adam Davidson	Byron Balasco & R. Scott Gemmill	October 6, 2026	5.49
2	"Family Business"	Eagle Egilsson	Kyle Harimoto	October 13, 2026	4.88
3	"Carousel"	Nick Gomez	Melissa Glenn	October 20, 2026	5.18
4	"Homecoming"	Cherie Nowlan	Joe Halpin	October 27, 2026	4.85
5	"True Love"	Nelson McCormick	Hennah Sekander	November 10, 2026	4.92
6	"My Companion"	Adam Davidson	Byron Balasco	November 17, 2026	4.66
7	"The River"	Maja Vrvilo	Joseph C. Wilson & Byron Balasco	December 1, 2026	TBD
8	"Statuario"	Anthony Hemingway	Kyle Harimoto	December 8, 2026	TBD

== Development ==
After the 2023 cancellation of NCIS: Los Angeles after 14 seasons, LL Cool J joined season 3 of NCIS: Hawaiʻi as a recurring guest star, reprising his character of Special Agent Sam Hanna. In late 2025, CBS Studios began to pitch a New York City–based spin-off focused on Hanna to LL Cool J. At his suggestion, CBS brought on R. Scott Gemmill—who had previously served as showrunner and executive producer of NCIS: Los Angeles—to write the pilot; he would draft the script during a Christmas break in production on The Pitt. Gemmill explained that he was excited by the project because it was a return "home" for both Hanna and LL Cool J, and because New York was "the burning center of the universe". Byron Balasco was brought on as showrunner. Scott Caan was cast as Hanna's partner; Caan had previously participated in an NCIS: Los Angeles crossover with Hawaii Five-0.

On April 15, 2026, CBS announced that it had ordered NCIS: New York to series as part of its fall lineup for the 2026–27 television season. LL Cool J explained that the show would "be a lot of fun", and have "a lot of sarcasm, lot of banter, lot of witty repartees, lot of New York. It's gonna be everything you need to get." In July 2026, Jennifer Beals joined the cast as the female lead.

== Release ==
=== Broadcast television ===
NCIS: New York premiered on October 6, 2026 on CBS in the United States. The program broadcasts on M-Net in Africa, Disney in the Balkans, Global TV in Canada, Hot in Israel, J:COM in Japan, AXN in Latin America, and Sky in New Zealand.

=== Streaming ===
NCIS: New York is streaming on Paramount + in the United States, Australia, Austria, Brazil, Ireland, Latin America, Germany, Switzerland, and the United Kingdom. The program streams on StackTV in Canada, Yes in Israel, Wowow in Japan, and Amazon Prime Video in Southeast Asia.
