= 2026 Holiday Bowl (December) =

Postseason college football bowl game

- 47th Holiday Bowl
- Date: December 28, 2026
- Season: 2026
- Stadium: Snapdragon Stadium
- Location: San Diego, California, US

United States TV coverage
- Network: The CW

The 2026 Holiday Bowl is an American college football bowl game that is scheduled to be played on December 28, 2026, at Snapdragon Stadium located in San Diego, California. The 47th edition of the Holiday Bowl will be one of the 2026–27 bowl games concluding the 2026 FBS football season.

== See also ==
- 2026 Poinsettia Bowl, contested at the same venue five days earlier
