= Einstein (American TV series) =

Upcoming American TV series

- Genre: Police procedural; Comedy drama
- Based on: Einstein by: Martin Ritzenhoff; Matthias Dinter
- Developed by: Andy Breckman
- Starring: Matthew Gray Gubler; Melissa Fumero; Aunjanue Ellis-Taylor
- Country of origin: United States
- Original language: English

Production
- Executive producers: Andy Breckman; Randy Zisk; Michael Rauch; Tariq Jalil; Rose Hughes; Rodrigo Herrera Ibarguengoytia; Laura Beetz
- Producer: Matthew Gray Gubler
- Production companies: Intrigue Entertainment; Seven One Studios International; CBS Studios

Original release
- Network: CBS
- Release: February 12, 2027

Einstein is an upcoming police procedural comedy drama television series that is set to premiere on February 12, 2027 on CBS. The American series is based on the 2017 German series and the 2015 film of the same name by Martin Ritzenhoff and Matthias Dinter. It is being executive produced by Randy Zisk and Andy Breckman. The series stars former Criminal Minds star Matthew Gray Gubler as Lewis Einstein, the great-grandson of Albert Einstein, partnering with a homicide detective solving complex homicide cases.

== Premise ==
The series centers on tenured Princeton Professor Lewis Einstein, who happens to be the great-grandson of famed scientist Albert Einstein. Despite his extraordinary intelligence, Lewis Einstein struggles with reckless behavior, and when his latest antics land him in serious trouble with the law, he avoids jail time by agreeing to help a local police detective, Teri, using his intelligence to solve complex homicide cases.

== Cast ==
=== Main ===
- Matthew Gray Gubler as Lewis Einstein, a tenured professor at Princeton University who, after reckless antics, ends up in trouble with the law, agrees to assist the local police department using his genius for solving difficult homicide cases, and is the great-grandson of Albert Einstein
- Melissa Fumero as Detective Teresa "Teri" London, a highly disciplined detective inspector for the New Jersey State Police who expects a lot from her colleagues and herself, and who is conflicted about working with the professor.
- Aunjanue Ellis-Taylor as Captain Marcia Frost, the current captain of the New Jersey State Police and a veteran police officer who is counting down the days until retirement.

=== Recurring ===
- Tony Shalhoub as Jack Einstein, the father of Lewis Einstein and grandson of Albert Einstein.

== Production ==
=== Development ===
In 2018, Tariq Jahil spearheaded a project to adapt the German TV series Einstein to American audiences. The original series was written by Martin Ritzenhoff and Matthias Dinter, based on 2015 film of the same name that they wrote. The pilot was written by Michael Reisz and produced by Carol Mendelsohn for development for NBC, but the series did not move forward. In 2019, it was reported that the project had moved to CBS, with Andy Breckman writing and Randy Zisk directing the series. In 2020, it was reported that, a gender-swapped version of the series was put in development by CBS, with Lauren Gussis serving as writer.

In June 2024, it was reported that the project had been re-developed for the direct U.S. adaptation with Breckman and Zisk returning the project as writer and director respectively. In August 2024, the pilot of the series was ordered by CBS. In April 2025, the show was greenlit and originally slated to air during the 2025-26 season but got delayed to the 2026-27 season.

=== Casting ===
In October 2024, it was announced that Matthew Gray Gubler would be playing the title role and serving as producer. Rosa Salazar's casting opposite him as a detective character, Veronica "Ronni" Paris was announced in November 2024. However, it was reported in May 2025 that after the series got delayed, Salazar had left the show. In March 2026, it was announced that Melissa Fumero would be replacing Salazar's character, though under a different name, Teresa "Teri" London. In the same month, Aunjanue Ellis-Taylor joined the main cast as Captain Marcia Frost. In May 2026, Tony Shalhoub joined the cast in a recurring role as Jack Einstein, reuniting with Breckman and Zisk from Monk, where Shaloub played the title role.

=== Filming ===
The show began filming in Montreal and Toronto in March 2026 and ended in August.

== Release ==
The series is set to premiere on February 12, 2027.
