= Super Bowl LXI halftime show =

Event during the 2027 Super Bowl

- Part of: Super Bowl LXI
- Date: February 14, 2027
- Location: Inglewood, California, U.S.
- Venue: SoFi Stadium
- Headliner: Jay-Z
- Sponsor: Apple Music

Super Bowl halftime show chronology
LX (2026)	LXI (2027)	LXII (2028)

The Super Bowl LXI halftime show, officially known as the Apple Music Super Bowl LXI Halftime Show, is the upcoming halftime entertainment for Super Bowl LXI, scheduled to take place on February 14, 2027, at SoFi Stadium in Inglewood, California. It will be headlined by Jay-Z. It will be televised nationally by ABC and ESPN.

== Background ==
Time listed Miley Cyrus, Justin Bieber, and Jay-Z as their top three performers that could headline. Other artists considered have included Sabrina Carpenter, Harry Styles, Jonas Brothers, Taylor Swift, Billie Eilish, BTS, Post Malone, Ariana Grande, and Dua Lipa. Following a leak by Apple Music on October 7, 2026 rumors began circulating that Cyrus would headline the halftime show. Cyrus would also share several black and white photos of herself with the caption "Bowl rehearsals, see you soon." This would cause confusion as fans were unsure if Cyrus was referring to the Super Bowl or her then upcoming performance at the 2026 Hollywood Bowl. On October 20, reports began circulating that Jay-Z had chosen himself to headline the 2027 halftime show. In response to the rumors, Roger Goodell would respond, "I am not aware of a leak. I've been in the committee meetings. So I'm not sure it’s a leak. We haven't announced anything. Until we do, we won't make any comment on that."

=== Announcement ===
Jay-Z was announced as headliner for the Apple Music Super Bowl LXI halftime show by the NFL, in partnership with Apple Music and Jay-Z's Roc Nation on October 26, 2026. The performance is scheduled for February 14, 2027, at SoFi Stadium in Inglewood, California.
