= Carthage Courthouse Square Historic District (Carthage, Missouri) =

Historic district in Missouri, United States

- U.S. National Register of Historic Places
- U.S. Historic district
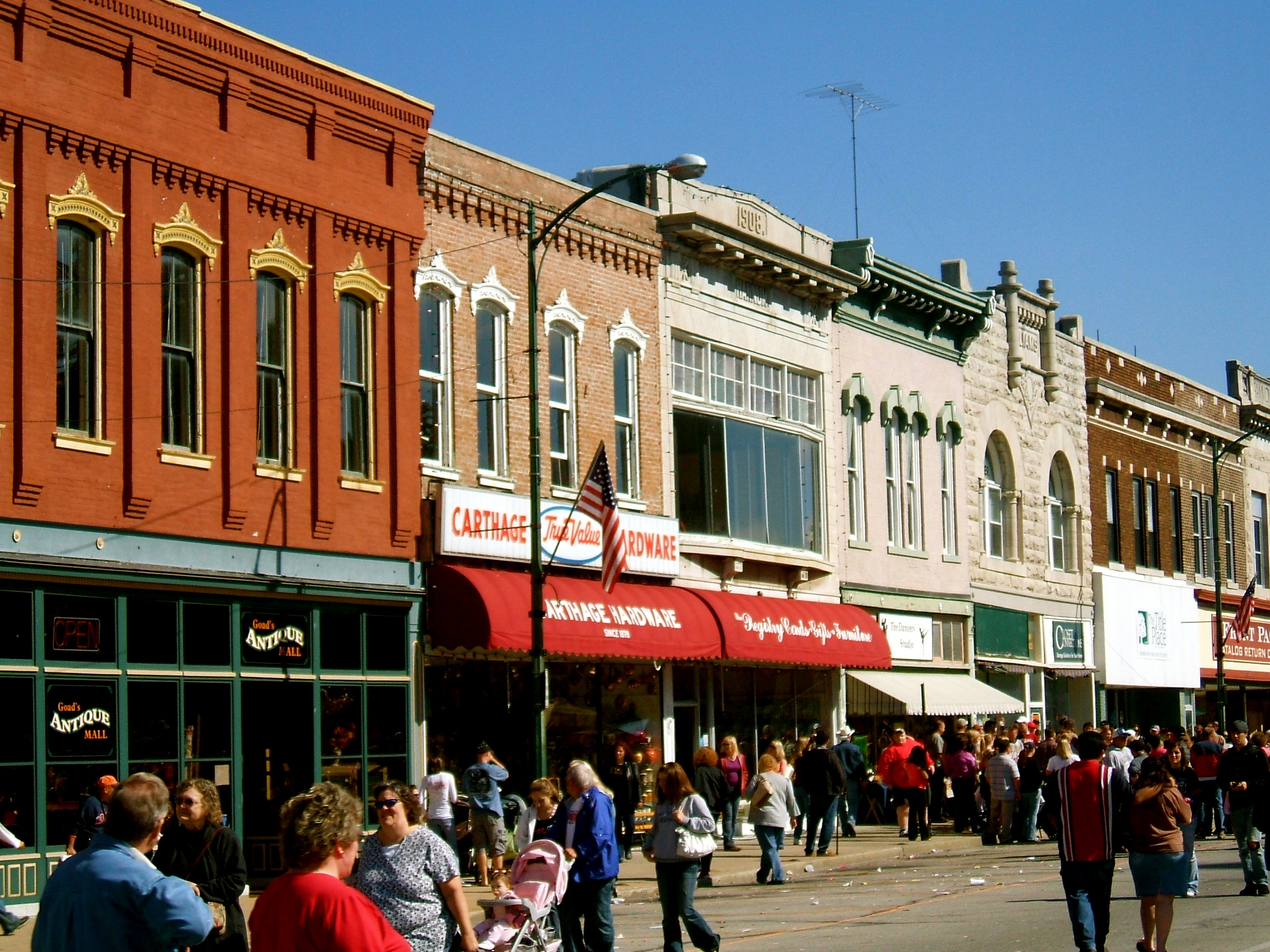

- Location within Missouri Location within the United States
- Location: Roughly bounded by E. Central Ave., S. Maple, Lincoln, and W. 5th Sts., Carthage, Missouri
- Coordinates: 37°10′36″N 94°18′37″W
- Area: 27.7 acres (11.2 ha)
- Architect: Multiple
- Architectural style: Italianate, Romanesque
- NRHP reference No.: 80002370
- Added to NRHP: May 15, 1980

Carthage Courthouse Square Historic District is a national historic district located at Carthage, Jasper County, Missouri. The district encompasses 42 contributing buildings in the central business district of Carthage. It developed in the late-19th and early-20th centuries and includes representative examples of Italianate and Romanesque Revival style architecture. Located in the district is the separately listed Jasper County Courthouse. Other notable buildings include the Bank of Carthage, Ben Franklin Store (1920s), Farmers and Drovers Bank / Miller Clothing Company (1875, 1908), Belk-Simpson Building (pre-1884), Carthage Water & Electric Co. (pre-1884), Snyder Building (1901), Drake Hotel (1920), Fire Department (1883), Leggett and Platt (1920), McNerney Block (1905), and Carthage National Bank.

It was listed on the National Register of Historic Places in 1980.
