= Cupertino (TV series) =

2026 American legal drama television series

- Genre: Legal drama
- Created by: Robert King; Michelle King
- Starring: Mike Colter; Rachel Keller; Ella Stiller; Nik Dodani; Busy Philipps; Renée Elise Goldsberry
- Music by: David Buckley
- Country of origin: United States
- Original language: English
- No. of seasons: 1
- No. of episodes: 8

Production
- Executive producers: Sam Hoffman; Liz Glotzer; Robert King; Michelle King
- Producer: Fran Giblin
- Cinematography: Fred Murphy; Petr Hlinomaz
- Editors: Matt Kregor; David Dworetzky; Dan Erickson
- Production companies: King Size Productions; CBS Studios

Original release
- Network: CBS
- Release: October 8, 2026 – present

Cupertino is an American legal drama television series created by Robert King and Michelle King, who also produce. The series stars Mike Colter as a Silicon Valley attorney who, after being denied his stock options and dismissed by his employer, forms a firm with another ousted lawyer (Rachel Keller) to represent people harmed by the technology industry. It takes its name from Cupertino, California, the Santa Clara County city that is home to Apple Inc.

Cupertino premiered on CBS on October 8, 2026. It received widespread praise from critics.

== Premise ==
Michael Price, an attorney working in Silicon Valley, is cheated out of his stock options and fired by the technology start-up that he co-founded. Rather than accept the outcome, he partners with Olivia Siffre, a lawyer recently dismissed from her own position, to open a practice devoted to clients who have been exploited by the region's technology companies.

== Cast ==
=== Main ===
- Mike Colter as Michael Price, an attorney who loses his job and his stock options at a Silicon Valley start-up
- Rachel Keller as Olivia Siffre, a young attorney who goes into practice with Price
- Ella Stiller as Christy Palladino, Michael's assistant at the start-up who was also fired
- Nik Dodani as Vikram, the firm’s tech expert
- Busy Philipps as Natalia Boutella
- Renée Elise Goldsberry as Nichole Ferebee

=== Recurring ===
- Rob McClure as Bo, a prospective client of the firm
- Joe Morton as Bayard, Price's father, a prominent attorney
- Steven Pasquale as Ry, an established Silicon Valley lawyer

== Episodes ==
No.	Title	Directed by	Written by	Original release date	U.S. viewers (millions)
1	"Michael & Olivia"	Robert King	Robert King & Michelle King	October 8, 2026	3.19
2	"Vik & Bo"	Ron Underwood	Robert King & Michelle King	October 15, 2026	2.86
3	"Juno"	John Dahl	Jennifer Cacicio	October 22, 2026	2.85
4	"A.J. & Buddy"	Robert King	Joey Hartstone	October 29, 2026	2.86
5	"Celeste"	Nancy Hower	Dewayne Darian Jones	November 5, 2026	3.01
6	"Harper"	Rosemary Rodriguez	Keith Eisner	November 8, 2026	TBD
7	"YUNGWOOD"	Rob Hardy	Aurin Squire	November 12, 2026	TBD
8	"Judith & Michael"	Tyne Rafaeli	Sejal Pachisia	November 19, 2026	TBD
9	"Khalil & Luke"	Joe Menendez	Jennifer Cacicio	December 3, 2026	TBD

== Production ==
=== Development ===
Legal drama The Good Wife (2009–2016) delved into technology and the law, and in 2016, showrunners Robert and Michelle King pitched a spinoff for the Diane Lockhart character (Christine Baranski), who was originally envisioned as moving to Silicon Valley. The eventual spinoff series, called The Good Fight (2017–2022), instead retained the Chicago setting of the original. After Paramount+ canceled Evil (2021–2024), the Kings refashioned their Silicon Valley idea into a standalone legal series, with a focus on David-versus-Goliath stories and the growing presence of AI in daily life.

The series was first set up in development at CBS in 2024. In May 2025 the network commissioned a full writers' room along with an order for thirteen scripts. The room opened that September, after Robert King completed directing duties on an episode of the Kings' CBS series Elsbeth (2024–present). CBS gave the project a formal series order in October 2025 for the 2026–27 television season, shortly after receiving the first material produced by the writers' room. Technology journalist Brian Merchant was also brought on as a consultant for the show's writers.

The Kings write and serve as co-showrunners, and executive produce through their CBS Studios-based banner King Size Productions alongside Liz Glotzer; Robert King directed the premiere episode. Sam Hoffman also serves as an executive producer. The series marks the Kings' first drama set against the technology industry, following their legal series The Good Wife, The Good Fight and Elsbeth.

=== Casting ===
Mike Colter was attached in a lead role at the time of the series pickup, reuniting him with the Kings after Evil and recurring roles on The Good Wife and The Good Fight. In February 2026, Busy Philipps was cast in a series regular role, joining Colter, Rachel Keller, Renée Elise Goldsberry, Ella Stiller and Nik Dodani. Later that month, Rob McClure, Joe Morton and Steven Pasquale joined as recurring guest stars.

Some publications have noted that the real-world city of Cupertino has a population of 70.9% Asian Americans and noted that, apart from Dodani, this is not reflected in the show's main cast, with the producers apparently choosing the location as a metonym for Big Tech. The series' producers have not responded to this critique.

== Release ==
Cupertino premiered on CBS on Thursday, October 8, 2026, at 10:00 p.m. ET, airing in the slot following Elsbeth. Episodes stream live on Paramount+ for subscribers to the service's premium tier and become available the following day to all subscribers.

== Reception ==
On the review aggregator website Rotten Tomatoes, the series holds an approval rating of 100%, based on 37 reviews, with an average of rated reviews of 8.5/10. The website's critics consensus reads, "Cupertino revitalizes the legal procedural with sharp wit, addictive courtroom drama, and sophisticated explorations of the tech industry's moral complexities, crafting biting satire with surprising humanity." Metacritic, which uses a weighted average, assigned a score of 85 out of 100 based on 20 critics, indicating "universal acclaim".
