= Line of Fire (2026 TV series) =

American family drama series

- Genre: Family drama; Procedural drama; Crime thriller
- Created by: Joshua Safran
- Starring: Peter Krause; Hope Davis; Kat Cunning; Tommy O'Brien; Taylor Bloom; Charlie Barnett
- Music by: Ariel Rechtshaid; Will Canzoneri
- Country of origin: United States
- Original language: English
- No. of seasons: 1
- No. of episodes: 8

Production
- Executive producers: Joshua Safran; Jenna Bush Hager; Ben Spector; Rebecca Thomas
- Producer: Peter Krause
- Production companies: Random Acts Productions; Thousand Voices; Universal Television

Original release
- Network: NBC
- Release: September 21, 2026 – present

Line of Fire is an American family action thriller television series created by Joshua Safran and produced by Universal Television for NBC. The series centers around a family of agents from various branches of federal law enforcement who find themselves tangled in a deadly conspiracy. The series stars Peter Krause, Hope Davis, Kat Cunning, Tommy O'Brien and Taylor Bloom. It premiered on September 21, 2026.

== Premise ==
The Hollingsworths are a family of law enforcement agents that bridge differences and cross boundaries as they take cases for the FBI, U.S. Marshals, Secret Service, and Department of Justice. After a case turns into a conspiracy, they must protect one another and bring the killer to justice, even if it means going against their code.

== Cast and characters ==
=== Main ===
- Peter Krause as Mike Hollingsworth, a Deputy Special Agent in Charge in the U.S. Secret Service and Jane's estranged husband
- Hope Davis as Jane Hollingsworth, a Deputy U.S. Marshal in the U.S. Marshals Service and Mike's estranged wife
- Kat Cunning as Clare Hollingsworth, a Special Agent in the FBI
- Tommy O'Brien as Mike "Micah" Hollingsworth Jr., a Special Agent in the U.S. Secret Service's Presidential Protective Division; assigned to First Daughter Sydney Kayana's detail
- Taylor Bloom as Russ Hollingsworth, an analyst in the Department of Justice National Security Division and Marine veteran.
- Charlie Barnett as Jack Hollingsworth, a veteran and Mike's son from his first marriage who was presumed dead

=== Guest ===
- Sam Waterston as Thomas Barnes, the former President of the United States who survived an assassination attempt
- Chris Chalk as Kayana, the incumbent President of the United States, codename "Stallion"
- Campbell Scott as Terry Cross, a United States Senator, member of the Judiciary Committee and Jane's boyfriend
- Savannah Lee Smith as Sydney, the First Daughter of President Kayana, codename "Sparrow"
- Anna Chlumsky as Libby Farrell, a Deputy U.S. Marshal
- Antoinette Crowe-Legacy as Nia Wallace, a Homeland Security agent leading a task force investigating the targeted killing of federal agents
- Tyler Posey as Brandon Hayes
- Zoë Winters as Emily, Mike’s new girlfriend

== Episodes ==
No.	Title	Directed by	Written by	Original air date	U.S. viewers (millions)
1	"Pilot"	Rebecca Thomas	Joshua Safran	September 21, 2026	3.20
Deputy U.S. Marshal Libby Farrell and fugitive cartel accountant Carlos Decina are killed by a masked gunman, who frames it as a mutual shooting. It is investigated by District U.S. Marshal Jane Hollingsworth and her daughter Clare, an FBI agent. Clare suspects foul play but is rebuffed by both agencies. Mike Hollingsworth, a retiring senior Secret Service agent asks for more time to investigate the assassination attempt of now former President Thomas Barnes. He admonishes his elder son Micah, a junior Secret Service agent, for sleeping with his protectee First Daughter Sydney Kayana, and asks his younger son Russ, a DOJ analyst, for files relating to the suspected shooter. Clare's boyfriend Logan Welling leaves dinner at the family home early due to awkward tensions. Clare discovers Farrell struck a deal with Decina's boss for experimental cancer treatment, and it is theorized he had them both killed. Jack Hollingsworth, Mike's presumed dead son, kills Logan in the family home when he returns to apologize. DHS agent Nia Wallace tells the Hollingsworths they are being targeted by a killer focused on federal agents. Jane and Mike find evidence of Jack's involvement, an origami left at the scenes of both Logan and Farrell's murders but keep it from investigators.
2	"A Bigger Picture"	Rebecca Thomas	Joshua Safran	September 28, 2026	N/A
Wallace sets up a task force to investigate the killer and grows suspicious looking into Logan's background in Wisconsin. Mike and Jane discuss how they told everyone Jack died when he went on a deep cover mission and agree to find him before Wallace does. Mike's retirement is paused and he is assigned to the Presidential Protective Division alongside Micah. Clare stays in work after Logan's death and butts heads with Jane investigating a deadly bank robbery in Elkton. After Russ assists in expediting subpoenas for them, they identify and neutralize the two perpetrators, and Jane saves Clare from being shot. Micah and Sydney conspire to conceal their relationship from President Kayana and the Secret Service. Micah later prevents a man stalking the First Lady from carrying out a surprise vitriol attack, impressing Mike. Clare temporarily moves into the Hollingsworth family residence. Jane obtains information from an ATF contact that Jack's undercover alias has not been paid in over a year, implying he died in service. They theorize someone who knew Jack left the origamis and plan to identify them. Wallace discovers Logan was an undercover CIA operative and tells Clare she believes he was assigned to get close to her. Jack observes the house from a distance.
3	"There Are Two Wolves"	David McWhirter	Diana Son	October 5, 2026	2.76
Despite pressure from the CIA to back off, Wallace is convinced by Clare to investigate Logan's links to North Carolina. She discovers another cover identity, Jason Marks, and information suggesting he got into relationships for missions before Clare. Jane secretly obtains information on the ATF and DEA agents killed before Farrell and Logan and worries about losing her job if it is discovered she removed the origamis from the crime scenes. Mike's dated and strict supervision methods draw the ire of the PPD, but Micah convinces him to change his leadership style. Russ brings Clare and Jane into an investigation of federal grand jury bribery and intimidation after one juror is killed. Concerned for their safety, the judge discharges the jury, which removes both FBI and USMS jurisdiction to further investigate. However, with the reluctant help of Jane's boyfriend, Senator Terry Cross (who is on the Judiciary Committee), the Hollingsworths identify the perpetrator as Eric Ting, a broker involved with cases linked to Triads and Mexican cartels. Feeling used, Terry decides to pause his relationship with Jane. Using an alias, Jack starts working as a dental technician in a practice directly next door to the disused store being used by Wallace's task force as a temporary headquarters.
4	"Paper Trails"	Lisa Robinson	Graham Norris	October 12, 2026	N/A
5	"Cul-de-Sac"	Roxann Dawson	Sascha Rothchild	October 19, 2026	N/A
6	"Cabin Pressure"	Darren Grant	Logan Slakter	October 26, 2026	TBD
7	"Guest List"	Yangzom Brauen	Saba Saghafi & Tiffany So	November 9, 2026	TBD
8	"Besieged"	Rebecca Thomas	Stephanie Hicks	November 16, 2026	TBD
9	"Blind Eye"	TBA	TBA	November 23, 2026	TBD

== Production ==
=== Development ===
Line of Fire is loosely based on the experiences of executive producer Jenna Bush Hager (daughter of former US President George W. Bush) with the United States Secret Service. In January 2026, it was given a pilot order, then called Protection. The pilot was written by Joshua Safran and directed by Rebecca Thomas. In May 2026, it was considered to be a strong contender for a series pickup while working under the title In the Line of Fire.

NBC announced the series order on May 8, 2026, with the new title being Line of Fire. In October 2026, the series was given a back order for five additional scripts, which in the event of continued ratings success, are intended to be converted to episodes for a full season of 18.

=== Casting ===
Peter Krause was the first actor cast for the pilot in February 2026. Hope Davis was added to the cast in early March 2026, followed by Tommy O'Brien, Kat Cunning, and Taylor Bloom. In August 2026, former Law & Order star Sam Waterston, Chris Chalk, and Campbell Scott were added as guest stars.

=== Music ===
The music for the series is composed by Ariel Rechtshaid and Will Canzoneri.

== Broadcast ==
Line of Fire premiered on NBC on September 21, 2026 and airs on Mondays.

== Reception ==
On the review aggregator website Rotten Tomatoes, the series holds an approval rating of 87%, based on 15 reviews, with an average of rated reviews of 6.5/10. The website's critics consensus reads, "Through an exciting blend of genres, Line of Fire agilely toes the line between family soap opera and crime procedural to fun effect." Metacritic, which uses a weighted average, assigned a score of 68 out of 100 based on 10 critics, indicating "generally favorable" reviews.
