= Super Bowl LXI =

2027 National Football League championship game

- Date: February 14, 2027
- Stadium: SoFi Stadium; Inglewood, California

Ceremonies
- Halftime show: Jay-Z

TV in the United States
- Network: Broadcast: ABC; Univision (Spanish); Cable: ESPN; ESPN2 (Manningcast); ESPNU (alternate telecast); NFL Network (alternate telecast); Disney Channel (alternate telecast); Disney XD (alternate telecast); ESPN Deportes (Spanish); Streaming: Disney+ ESPN Unlimited; NFL+
- Announcers: Joe Buck (play-by-play); Troy Aikman (analyst); Lisa Salters and Laura Rutledge (sideline reporters); Russell Yurk (rules analyst); Peyton Manning and Eli Manning (Manningcast); Pat McAfee, Dan Orlovsky, and Darius Butler (ESPNU); Field Yates, Chase Daniel, Louis Riddick, and Seth Walder (NFL Network)

Radio in the United States
- Network: Westwood One

Super Bowl LXI is the upcoming American football championship game of the National Football League (NFL) for the 2026 season. The game will be played on February 14, 2027, at SoFi Stadium in Inglewood, California. This will be the ninth Super Bowl hosted by the Greater Los Angeles area, and the second at this venue, the first being Super Bowl LVI in 2022. It will also be the first Super Bowl to be played on both Valentine's Day and Presidents' Day weekend.

The game is set to be the first time in Super Bowl history that the main U.S. national telecast will be simulcast on both a broadcast network (ABC) and its sister cable network (ESPN), in addition to multiple altcasts across other sister networks (ESPN2, ESPNU, NFL Network, Disney Channel, and Disney XD). The main broadcast and altcasts will also be streamed on Disney+ and ESPN DTC.

== Background ==
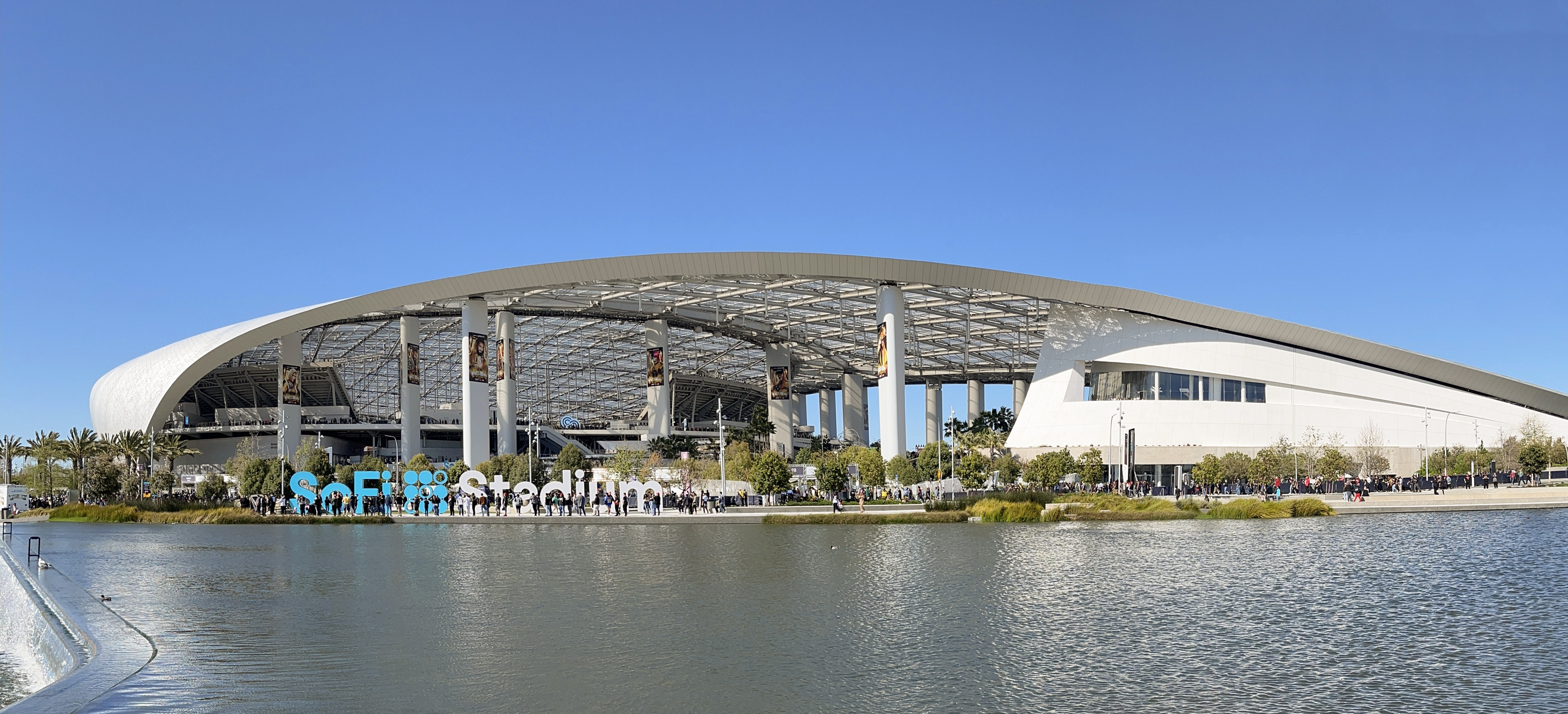
SoFi Stadium in Inglewood, California, the venue of the game

=== Host selection ===
The league has made all decisions regarding hosting sites from Super Bowl LVII onward. There is no bidding process per site: the league selects a potential venue unilaterally, the chosen team puts together a hosting proposal, and then the league votes to determine whether it is acceptable.

On December 13, 2023, the NFL announced that SoFi Stadium, home of both the Los Angeles Rams and the Los Angeles Chargers, was selected as the Super Bowl site. This will be the second Super Bowl hosted by the venue and ninth hosted in the Greater Los Angeles Metropolitan Area, with SoFi Stadium last hosting Super Bowl LVI in 2022.

=== Logo ===
The official logo for Super Bowl LXI was unveiled by the game's broadcaster ESPN on February 8, 2026, during a special post-Super Bowl LX edition of SportsCenter with Scott Van Pelt from SoFi Stadium. It was formally unveiled during a press conference in Los Angeles the following day, accompanied by an introductory video narrated by Inglewood-based rapper D Smoke. Keeping with the tradition established at Super Bowl LVI, the logo features Roman numerals with imagery representing the host city/region, in this case being waves – reflecting Southern California's surfing culture and the "grit and tenacity of Los Angeles".

== Entertainment ==
=== Halftime ===
On October 20, 2026, Puck and Deadline Hollywood reported that the American rapper Jay-Z, whose production company Roc Nation has overseen the halftime show since 2019, would headline the Super Bowl LXI halftime show. The selection was confirmed by the NFL on October 26.

== Broadcasting ==
=== United States ===
==== Television ====
Super Bowl LXI is scheduled to be nationally televised by ABC in English and simulcast on ESPN. It will be the fourth Super Bowl to be broadcast under the current 11-year NFL television contract, which allows a four-year rotation between CBS, Fox, NBC, and ABC/ESPN. It will mark ABC's first Super Bowl since Super Bowl XL in 2006, and the first time in Super Bowl history that a broadcast network's main telecast is simulcast on a sister cable network. The game is expected to be called by ESPN's lead commentary team of Joe Buck (play-by-play) and Troy Aikman (color), who will be calling the Super Bowl together for the first time since their 2022 move to ESPN from Fox. Aikman has indicated that this will be his last game as a color commentator for ESPN and ABC, as his contract expires following the game and he does not expect to renew it. The game will be broadcast in Spanish by ESPN Deportes and Univision, with each carrying a separate broadcast. ABC will air a new episode of High Potential after the game.

In addition to the main telecast on ABC and ESPN, four ESPN-produced altcasts are scheduled across ESPN and parent company Disney's cable networks, including Peyton and Eli on ESPN2, Field Pass with The Pat McAfee Show on ESPNU, the analytics-oriented Playbook with Next Gen Stats on NFL Network (which was acquired by ESPN in 2026), and the youth-oriented Star Wars Funday Football on Disney Channel and Disney XD (which will feature a real-time 3D recreation of the game with Star Wars characters). The game and its altcasts will be streamed on the ESPN streaming service and Disney+.

ESPN will employ a significantly expanded production for the game, with executive producer Steve Ackles stating that its production compound would utilize 21 trucks (as opposed to the usual convoy of six trucks used by Monday Night Football), and that the game will be produced in 4K. The broadcast will be directed by Artie Kempner, who worked several previous Super Bowl games with Fox before joining ESPN and MNF in 2025. ABC and ESPN will broadcast from a complex on Santa Monica State Beach during Super Bowl week, which will host four studios, and a "football festival" with entertainment and Disney promotional presences.

Disney itself launched a company-wide "Year of the Super Bowl" campaign following Super Bowl LX to promote the game's telecast, featuring cross-promotion across its various platforms and properties during the year prior to the game, and a reimagining of its "I'm going to Disneyland/Disney World!" campaign depicting Disney characters and personalities declaring that they were going to Super Bowl LXI. ABC shows and specials are being used to cross-promote Super Bowl LXI, such as Dancing with the Stars (which hosted a Super Bowl theme week with Buck as guest judge), and ABC's telecast of the 69th Grammy Awards from Los Angeles on the Sunday preceding the game.

==== Advertising ====
Disney charged an average rate of $8.5–10 million for a 30-second advertisement during Super Bowl LXI. The company had initially attempted to charge a $10 million rate on par with NBC's rates for Super Bowl LX, along with requiring advertisers to commit to an equivalent spend across other Disney platforms, but became more willing to negotiate after a lukewarm reception from advertisers. All national advertising inventory will be simulcast across the various feeds of the game, while the Star Wars Funday Football feed on Disney Channel and Disney XD will be commercial-free. Disney CFO Hugh Johnston stated that 58 individual brands had purchased advertisements during the game, including nine first-time advertisers.

Disney's plans to simulcast the game across ABC, ESPN cable networks, and Disney Streaming services has been faced with concern from ABC's affiliate board, who believed that it would dilute broadcast television viewership and local advertising revenue (with at least one station group projecting a 35% decline in comparison to previous games); unlike Paramount+, Tubi, and Peacock—which streamed the previous three Super Bowl games for CBS, Fox, and NBC, respectively—Disney+ does not presently offer the ability for streams to insert geotargeted advertising sold by ABC's affiliates.

==== Radio ====
Westwood One holds the national radio rights to the game.

=== International ===
- In the United Kingdom, the game will be televised free-to-air by 5, and on Virgin Media Television in Ireland.
- In Latin America, the game will be televised by ESPN and its streaming and on-demand platform Disney+.
- In Germany and Austria, the game will be televised by RTL.
- In Serbia, the game will be televised by Arena Sport.
- In Africa, the game will be televised by ESPN Africa and Disney+ in South Africa.
