= The Rookie: North =

Upcoming American television series

- Genre: Police procedural
- Created by: Alexi Hawley
- Written by: Alexi Hawley
- Starring: Jay Ellis; Chris Sullivan; Janet Montgomery; Mya Lowe; Malik Watson; Froy Gutierrez; Karen Fukuhara
- Country of origin: United States
- Original language: English

Production
- Executive producers: Alexi Hawley; Nathan Fillion; Bill Norcross; Michelle Chapman
- Producer: Jay Ellis
- Production location: Vancouver
- Production companies: Lionsgate Television; Perfectman Pictures; 20th Television

Original release
- Network: ABC

Related
- The Rookie; The Rookie: Feds

The Rookie: North is an upcoming American police procedural television series and a spin-off of The Rookie. It is scheduled to premiere on January 6, 2027 on ABC.

== Premise ==
Alex Holland believed his midlife wasn't worthy of a crisis. But after a violent home invasion ignites a dormant purpose, Alex battles a lifetime of failed commitments by joining the Pierce County Police Department as a rookie. Policing from the urban coast to the rural forest where backup isn't just five minutes away, Alex must prove to his skeptical training officer, his fellow rookies and himself, that he's finally found something worthy of the fight.

== Cast ==
=== Main ===
- Jay Ellis as Alex Holland
- Chris Sullivan as Nix
- Janet Montgomery as Charlotte Dru
- Mya Lowe as Elora Howe
- Malik Watson as Mark Lewis
- Froy Gutierrez as Odell Chance
- Karen Fukuhara as Leah Mizuno

=== Recurring ===
- Curtis Lum as Officer Charley Furst
- Andy Allo as Brooke

=== Crossover characters from The Rookie ===
- Nathan Fillion as John Nolan
- Melissa O'Neil as Lucy Chen
- Eric Winter as Tim Bradford

== Production ==
=== Development ===
On December 5, 2024, it was announced that a second spin-off series of The Rookie was in development. On November 24, 2025 the series gets pilot order. On May 11, 2026 the series gets series order. Principal photography for the series began on August 11, 2026 and will conclude on November 23, 2026 in Vancouver.

=== Casting ===
Jay Ellis was the first to be cast in the series. On January 14, 2026, Chris Sullivan joined Ellis. On February 13, 2026, Froy Gutierrez, Janet Montgomery, Karen Fukuhara, Mya Lowe and Malik Watson were cast as series regular. On August 19, 2026, Curtis Lum joined the series in a recurring role.

== Release ==
The Rookie: North will premiere on January 6, 2027 on ABC.
