= Sunset P.I. =

American sitcom

- Genre: Procedural; Sitcom
- Created by: Dan Goor; Luke Del Tredici
- Starring: Jake Johnson; Jane Levy; Keith David; Langston Kerman; Mary Shalaby
- Country of origin: United States
- Original language: English

Production
- Executive producers: Akiva Schaffer; Dan Goor; Luke Del Tredici
- Camera setup: Single-camera
- Running time: 30 minutes
- Production companies: Tumultuous, Inc.; Dr. Goor Productions; Universal Television

Original release
- Network: NBC

Sunset P.I. is an upcoming American procedural sitcom that is scheduled to premiere on February 8, 2027, on NBC. The show was created by Dan Goor and Luke Del Tredici, and stars Jake Johnson, Jane Levy, Keith David, Langston Kerman, and Mary Shalaby.

== Synopsis ==
Sunset P.I. is about a proud tradition of Los Angeles private eyes that began with Philip Marlowe and will end with this show.

== Cast ==
- Jake Johnson as Mickey Wilder
- Jane Levy as Faye
- Keith David as Garner Taggert
- Langston Kerman as Justin Royal
- Mary Shalaby as Raya

== Episodes ==
No.	Title	Directed by	Written by	Original release date
1	"Pilot"	Akiva Schaffer	TBA	February 8, 2027

== Production ==
In May 2026, the series was greenlit, starring Jake Johnson, Jane Levy, Keith David, Langston Kerman, and Mary Shalaby. The show is scheduled to premiere on February 8, 2027.
