= 2020–21 Canadian network television schedule =

Television schedule for the five major English commercial broadcast networks in Canada

The 2020–21 network television schedule for the five major English commercial broadcast networks in Canada covers primetime hours from September 2020 through August 2021. The schedule is followed by a list per network of returning series, new series, and series cancelled after the 2019–20 television season, for Canadian, American and other series. CBC was first to announce its fall schedule on May 27, 2020, followed by Citytv on June 22, and CTV and Global on June 23. CTV was first to announce its winter schedule on December 1, followed by Global on December 16 and the CBC on December 17, 2020. As in the past, the commercial networks' announcements come shortly after they have had a chance to buy Canadian rights to new American series. CTV 2 is not included on Saturday as it normally only schedules encore programming in primetime on Saturdays.

== Legend ==
- Light blue indicates local programming.
- Grey indicates encore programming.
- Blue-grey indicates news programming.
- Light green indicates sporting events/coverage.
- Light purple indicates movies.
- Red indicates Canadian content shows, which is programming that originated in Canada.
- Light yellow indicates the current schedule.

== Schedule ==
- New series to Canadian television are highlighted in **bold**.
- All times given are in Canadian Eastern Time and Pacific Time (except for some live events or specials, including most sports, which are given in Eastern Time). Subtract one hour for Central time for most programs (excluding CBC). Airtimes may vary in the Atlantic and Mountain times and do not necessarily align with U.S. stations in the Mountain time zone. Add one half-hour to Atlantic Time schedule for Newfoundland time. (See also: Effects of time zones on North American broadcasting)

=== Sunday ===
Network		7:00 p.m.	7:30 p.m.	8:00 p.m.	8:30 p.m.	9:00 p.m.	9:30 p.m.	10:00 p.m.	10:30 p.m.
CBC	Fall	**Because News**	The Great British Baking Show			**Enslaved**		The National	
CBC	Winter	Heartland		Les Misérables		Les Misérables		The National	
CBC	Mid-Winter	Heartland		The Great Canadian Baking Show		**Belgravia**		The National	
Citytv	Fall	Local programming		The Simpsons	Bless the Harts	Bob's Burgers	Family Guy	Card Sharks	
Citytv	Winter	The Simpsons	Bless the Harts	American Idol				Bob's Burgers	Family Guy
Citytv	Summer	Local programming	Duncanville	Celebrity Family Feud		**The Chase**		Mom (R)	
CTV	Fall	NFL overrun (continued to game completion)	NFL on CTV Live	Encore programming					
CTV	Mid-fall	NFL overrun (continued to game completion)	NFL on CTV Live	**Supermarket Sweep**		Who Wants to Be a Millionaire		Weakest Link	
CTV	Winter	Encore programming		**Holmes Family Effect**		MasterChef Canada		The Rookie	
CTV	Late winter	The Big Bang Theory (R)		Ellen's Game of Games		MasterChef Canada		Who Wants to Be a Millionaire	
CTV	Spring	Ellen's Game of Games (R)		Ellen's Game of Games		MasterChef Canada		The Rookie	
CTV	Summer	Encore programming		**Wipeout**		Love Island			
CTV 2	Fall	Encore programming		Football Night in America	NBC Sunday Night Football				
CTV 2	Winter	Encore programming							
Global	Fall	60 Minutes		Big Brother		NCIS: Los Angeles		NCIS: New Orleans	
Global	Winter	60 Minutes		**The Equalizer**		NCIS: Los Angeles		NCIS: New Orleans	
Global	Summer	60 Minutes		Big Brother		Nurses		48 Hours	

=== Monday ===
Network		7:00 p.m.	7:30 p.m.	8:00 p.m.	8:30 p.m.	9:00 p.m.	9:30 p.m.	10:00 p.m.	10:30 p.m.
CBC	Fall	Coronation Street	Family Feud Canada	**The Sounds**		Pure		The National	
CBC	Winter	Coronation Street	Family Feud Canada	Murdoch Mysteries		Frankie Drake Mysteries		The National	
Citytv	Fall	Local programming		Dancing with the Stars				The Twilight Zone	
Citytv	Winter	Local programming		The Bachelor				Encore programming	
Citytv	Spring	Local programming		American Idol				Encore programming	
Citytv	Late spring	Hell's Kitchen: Young Guns		The Bachelorette				**The Republic of Sarah**	
Citytv	Summer	Hell's Kitchen: Young Guns		Bachelor in Paradise				**The Republic of Sarah**	
CTV	Fall	Etalk	The Big Bang Theory (R)	Jann	Encore programming	**Filthy Rich**		**Weakest Link**	
CTV	Mid-fall	Etalk	The Big Bang Theory (R)	Encore programming	Bob Hearts Abishola	All Rise		The Good Doctor	
CTV	Winter	All Rise		Encore programming	Bob Hearts Abishola	9-1-1: Lone Star		The Good Doctor	
CTV	Spring	All Rise		B Positive	Bob Hearts Abishola	9-1-1: Lone Star		The Good Doctor	
CTV	Late spring	Etalk	The Big Bang Theory (R)	American Ninja Warrior				**The Celebrity Dating Game**	
CTV 2	Fall	The Big Bang Theory (R)	Etalk	American Ninja Warrior				Encore programming	
CTV 2	Mid-fall	The Big Bang Theory (R)	Etalk	The Voice				**Filthy Rich**	
CTV 2	Winter	The Big Bang Theory (R)	Etalk	Encore programming					
CTV 2	Spring	The Big Bang Theory (R)	Etalk	Encore programming		**HouseBroken**	Encore programming		
Global	Fall	ET	ET Canada	The Neighborhood (R)		**One Day at a Time**		**Manhunt: Deadly Games**	
Global	Mid-fall	ET	ET Canada	Private Eyes		**Next**		Bull	
Global	Winter	ET	ET Canada	9-1-1		The Wall		Bull	
Global	Spring	ET	ET Canada	9-1-1		Big Brother Canada		Bull	
Global	Summer	ET	ET Canada	The Neighborhood	Call Your Mother	Nurses		**Small Fortune**	

=== Tuesday ===
Network		7:00 p.m.	7:30 p.m.	8:00 p.m.	8:30 p.m.	9:00 p.m.	9:30 p.m.	10:00 p.m.	10:30 p.m.
CBC	Fall	Coronation Street	Family Feud Canada	Still Standing	22 Minutes	Baroness von Sketch Show	Catastrophe	The National	
CBC	Winter	Coronation Street	Family Feud Canada	Kim's Convenience	22 Minutes	Baroness von Sketch Show	**Humour Resources**	The National	
CBC	Mid-winter	Coronation Street	Family Feud Canada	Kim's Convenience	22 Minutes	Workin' Moms	TallBoyz	The National	
Citytv	Fall	Local programming		The Bachelorette				Encore programming	
Citytv	Winter	Local programming		Hudson and Rex		Black-ish	Mixed-ish	Mom (R)	
Citytv	Mid-winter	Black-ish	Mixed-ish	**Young Rock**	**Kenan**	Hudson and Rex		Mom (R)	
Citytv	Spring	Local programming		America's Got Talent				**Capital One College Bowl**	
CTV	Fall	Etalk	The Big Bang Theory (R)	Encore programming		Ellen's Game of Games		Transplant (R)	
CTV	Mid-fall	Etalk	The Big Bang Theory (R)	The Voice		This Is Us		**Big Sky**	
CTV	Winter	Etalk	The Big Bang Theory (R)	The Resident		This Is Us		**Big Sky**	
CTV	Spring	Etalk	The Big Bang Theory (R)	**Lego Masters**		**Mental Samurai**		Transplant (R)	
CTV	Summer	Etalk	The Big Bang Theory (R)	**Lego Masters**		**Mental Samurai**		Love Island	
CTV 2		The Big Bang Theory (R)	Etalk	**In the Dark**		Encore programming			
Global	Fall	ET	ET Canada	NCIS (R)		**Next**		**The FBI Declassified**	
Global	Mid-fall / Winter	ET	ET Canada	NCIS		FBI		FBI: Most Wanted	
Global	Spring	FBI: Most Wanted		NCIS		Prodigal Son		New Amsterdam	
Global	Summer	ET	ET Canada	NCIS (R)		**Fantasy Island**		FBI: Most Wanted (R)	

=== Wednesday ===
Network		7:00 p.m.	7:30 p.m.	8:00 p.m.	8:30 p.m.	9:00 p.m.	9:30 p.m.	10:00 p.m.	10:30 p.m.
CBC	Fall	Coronation Street	Family Feud Canada	**War of the Worlds**		**Trickster**		The National	
CBC	Winter	Coronation Street	Family Feud Canada	Encore programming		**Quiz**		The National	
CBC	Mid-winter	Coronation Street	Family Feud Canada	Coroner		**Pretty Hard Cases**		The National	
Citytv	Fall/Winter	Local programming		Chicago Med		Chicago Fire		Chicago P.D.	
Citytv	Spring	A Million Little Things		Chicago Med		Chicago Fire		Chicago P.D.	
Citytv	Late spring	Local programming		Press Your Luck		Hudson & Rex (R)		Card Sharks	
Citytv	Summer	Press Your Luck		America's Got Talent		Hudson & Rex (R)		Mom	
CTV	Fall	The Amazing Race		The Masked Singer		The Goldbergs	The Conners	For Life	
CTV	Winter	Etalk	The Big Bang Theory (R)	**The Masked Dancer**		The Goldbergs	The Conners	For Life	
CTV	Late winter	Etalk	The Big Bang Theory (R)	The Masked Singer		Call Me Kat	The Goldbergs (R)	The Big Bang Theory (R)	
CTV	Spring	Etalk	The Big Bang Theory (R)	The Masked Singer		The Conners	**Home Economics**	Law & Order: Special Victims Unit	
CTV	Late spring	Etalk	The Big Bang Theory (R)	MasterChef: Legends		The $100,000 Pyramid		Ellen's Game of Games (R)	
CTV	Summer	Etalk	The Big Bang Theory (R)	MasterChef: Legends		The $100,000 Pyramid		Love Island	
CTV 2	Fall	The Big Bang Theory (R)	Etalk	Encore programming					
CTV 2	Spring	The Big Bang Theory (R)	Etalk	**Kung Fu**		Encore programming			
Global	Fall	ET	ET Canada	Big Brother		**I Can See Your Voice**		**48 Hours: Suspicion**	
Global	Mid-fall	ET	ET Canada	Private Eyes (R)		**I Can See Your Voice**		S.W.A.T.	
Global	Winter	ET	ET Canada	Prodigal Son		SEAL Team		S.W.A.T.	
Global	Mid-winter	ET	ET Canada	Tough as Nails		SEAL Team		S.W.A.T.	
Global	Spring	Big Brother Canada		Kids Say the Darndest Things		SEAL Team		S.W.A.T.	
Global	Summer	ET	ET Canada	Big Brother		**Family Game Fight!**		S.W.A.T. (R)	

=== Thursday ===
Network		7:00 p.m.	7:30 p.m.	8:00 p.m.	8:30 p.m.	9:00 p.m.	9:30 p.m.	10:00 p.m.	10:30 p.m.
CBC	Fall	Coronation Street	Family Feud Canada	Battle of the Blades		Dragon's Den		The National	
CBC	Winter	Coronation Street	Family Feud Canada	Burden of Truth		The Fifth Estate		The National	
Citytv	Fall	Local programming		Celebrity Family Feud		Press Your Luck		Mom	
Citytv	Mid-fall	Local programming		Encore programming					
Citytv	Winter	Local programming	**Mr. Mayor**	Hell's Kitchen: Las Vegas		Mom	Mom (R)	Mom (R)	
Citytv	Spring	Manifest		Hell's Kitchen: Las Vegas		Mom	Mom (R)	Law & Order: Organized Crime	
Citytv	Summer	Beat Shazam		Brooklyn Nine-Nine		Hudson & Rex (R)		Mom (R)	
CTV	Fall	Etalk	The Big Bang Theory (R)	Encore programming		Match Game		**Star Trek: Discovery**	
CTV	Mid-fall	Station 19		Young Sheldon	**B Positive**	Grey's Anatomy		Law & Order: Special Victims Unit	
CTV	Winter	Etalk	The Big Bang Theory (R)	Young Sheldon	**B Positive**	**Call Me Kat**	The Big Bang Theory (R)	Law & Order: Special Victims Unit	
CTV	Late winter	Station 19		Young Sheldon	**B Positive**	Grey's Anatomy		Law & Order: Special Victims Unit	
CTV	Spring	Etalk	Young Sheldon	Station 19		Grey's Anatomy		**Rebel**	
CTV	Summer	Etalk	The Big Bang Theory (R)	Holey Moley		Making It		Love Island	
CTV	Mid-summer	Etalk	The Big Bang Theory (R)	Holey Moley		Making It		Law & Order: Special Victims Unit (R)	
CTV 2	Fall	The Big Bang Theory (R)	Thursday Night Football						
CTV 2	Spring	The Big Bang Theory (R)	Etalk	Encore programming					
Global	Fall	ET	ET Canada	Big Brother		Late Night with Seth Meyers (R)	Connecting	**Departure**	
Global	Winter	ET	ET Canada	**Call Your Mother**	Superstore	The Neighborhood	The Unicorn	**Private Eyes**	
Global	Mid-winter	ET	ET Canada	**Call Your Mother**	Superstore	The Neighborhood	The Unicorn	**Clarice**	
Global	Spring	ET	ET Canada	The Neighborhood	**United States of Al**	Big Brother Canada		**Clarice**	
Global	Summer	ET	ET Canada	Big Brother		Private Eyes		Bull (R)	

=== Friday ===
Network		7:00 p.m.	7:30 p.m.	8:00 p.m.	8:30 p.m.	9:00 p.m.	9:30 p.m.	10:00 p.m.	10:30 p.m.
CBC	Fall	Coronation Street		Marketplace	You Can't Ask That	Landscape Artist of the Year Canada		The National	
CBC	Mid-fall	Coronation Street		Marketplace	You Can't Ask That	The Nature of Things		The National	
CBC	Winter	Coronation Street		Marketplace	**Anyone's Game**	The Nature of Things		The National	
CBC	Mid-winter	Coronation Street		Marketplace	**Arctic Vets**	The Nature of Things		The National	
Citytv	Fall	Local programming		Fall in Love Fridays				Mom (R)	
Citytv	Winter	Local programming		Encore programming				Hudson & Rex (R)	
CTV	Fall/Winter/Spring	Etalk	The Big Bang Theory (R)	Shark Tank		Magnum P.I.		Blue Bloods	
CTV	Summer	Etalk	The Big Bang Theory (R)	**Superman & Lois**		Love Island		Encore programming	
CTV 2		The Big Bang Theory (R)	Etalk	CTV Movie				Corner Gas (R)	
Global	Fall	ET	ET Canada	**The Greatest#AtHome Videos**		Undercover Boss		Border Security: America's Front Line (R)	
Global	Mid-fall / winter	ET	ET Canada	The Blacklist		MacGyver		Border Security: America's Front Line (R)	

=== Saturday ===
Network		7:00 p.m.	7:30 p.m.	8:00 p.m.	8:30 p.m.	9:00 p.m.	9:30 p.m.	10:00 p.m.	10:30 p.m.
CBC	Fall	Short Film Face Off		Encore programming		Movie Night in Canada			
CBC	Mid-fall	Absolutely Canadian		Encore programming		Movie Night in Canada			
CBC	Winter	Hockey Night in Canada						Hockey Night in Canada	
Citytv	Fall	Encore programming							
Citytv	Winter	Hockey Night in Canada						Encore programming	
Citytv	Summer	Encore programming		Bachelor in Paradise				Encore programming	
CTV	Fall	W5		American Housewife	Jann (R)	CTV Movie			
CTV	Spring	W5		CTV Movie				Encore programming	
Global		Border Security: America's Front Line (R)		Encore programming		Crime Beat		48 Hours	

== By network ==
=== CBC ===
Returning series:

- Baroness von Sketch Show
- Battle of the Blades
- Burden of Truth
- Catastrophe
- Coroner
- Diggstown
- Family Feud Canada
- The Fifth Estate
- Frankie Drake Mysteries
- The Great Canadian Baking Show
- The Great British Baking Show
- Halifax Comedy Fest
- Heartland
- Just for Laughs: Galas
- Kim's Convenience
- Marketplace
- Murdoch Mysteries
- The National
- The Nature of Things
- Pure
- Still Standing
- TallBoyz
- 22 Minutes
- Workin' Moms
- You Can't Ask That

New series:

- Anyone's Game
- Arctic Vets
- Enslaved
- Pretty Hard Cases
- The Sounds
- Trickster
- War of the Worlds

Not returning from 2019–20:

- Anne
- Back in Time for Winter
- The Detectives
- Endlings (moved to CBC Gem)
- Find Me in Paris (moved to CBC Gem)
- Fortunate Son
- Fridge Wars
- In the Making
- Northern Rescue
- The Oland Murder
- Schitt's Creek
- Wild Bill

=== Citytv ===
Returning series:

- A Million Little Things
- American Idol (moved from CTV)
- America's Got Talent
- The Bachelor
- Bachelor in Paradise USA
- The Bachelorette
- Beat Shazam
- Black-ish
- Bless the Harts
- Bob's Burgers
- Brooklyn Nine-Nine
- Card Sharks
- Celebrity Family Feud
- Chicago Fire
- Chicago Med
- Chicago P.D.
- Dancing with the Stars
- Duncanville
- Fall in Love Fridays
- Family Guy
- Hell's Kitchen
- Hudson & Rex
- Manifest
- Mixed-ish
- Mom
- Press Your Luck
- The Simpsons

New series

- Capital One College Bowl
- The Chase
- The Great North
- Kenan
- Law & Order: Organized Crime
- Mr. Mayor
- The Republic of Sarah
- Young Rock

Not returning from 2019–20:

- The Bachelor: The Greatest Seasons- Ever!
- The Bachelor Presents: Listen to Your Heart
- The Baker and the Beauty
- Bluff City Law
- Council of Dads
- Four Weddings and a Funeral
- Lincoln Rhyme: Hunt for the Bone Collector
- Perfect Harmony
- Vagrant Queen

=== CTV/CTV 2 ===
Returning series:

- 9-1-1: Lone Star
- All Rise
- The Amazing Race USA (returned from 2018–19)
- American Housewife
- American Ninja Warrior
- Blue Bloods
- Bob Hearts Abishola
- The Conners
- Etalk
- For Life
- The Good Doctor
- Grey's Anatomy
- Holey Moley (moved from Global)
- Jann
- L.A.'s Finest
- Law & Order: Special Victims Unit
- Love Island
- Magnum P.I.
- Making It
- The Masked Singer
- MasterChef Canada (returned from 2018–19)
- MasterChef USA (returned from 2018–19)
- Mental Samurai (moved from Citytv)
- The $100,000 Pyramid
- The Resident
- The Rookie
- Shark Tank
- Station 19
- This Is Us
- W5
- Who Wants to Be a Millionaire
- The Voice
- Young Sheldon

New series:

- B Positive
- Big Sky
- Call Me Kat
- The Celebrity Dating Game
- Filthy Rich
- Holmes Family Effect
- Home Economics
- HouseBroken
- Kung Fu
- Lego Masters
- The Masked Dancer
- Rebel
- Superman & Lois
- Supermarket Sweep
- Weakest Link
- Wipeout

Not returning from 2019–20:

- Agents of S.H.I.E.L.D.
- Almost Family
- American Idol (moved to Citytv)
- Blindspot
- Cardinal
- Double Your Dish
- Emergence
- Flirty Dancing
- God Friended Me
- How to Get Away with Murder
- I Do, Redo
- Mary's Kitchen Crush
- The Masked Singer: After the Mask
- Stumptown
- Transplant (returned for 2021–22)
- World of Dance
- Zoey's Extraordinary Playlist

=== Global ===
Returning series:

- 48 Hours (moved from CHCH/CHEK)
- 60 Minutes (moved from CHCH/CHEK)
- 9-1-1
- Big Brother Canada
- Big Brother USA
- The Blacklist
- Bull
- Crime Beat
- ET
- ET Canada
- FBI
- FBI: Most Wanted
- Kids Say the Darndest Things
- MacGyver
- NCIS
- NCIS: Los Angeles
- NCIS: New Orleans
- The Neighborhood
- New Amsterdam
- Nurses
- Private Eyes
- Prodigal Son
- SEAL Team
- Superstore
- S.W.A.T.
- The Unicorn

New series:

- Call Your Mother
- Clarice
- Connecting
- Departure
- The Equalizer
- Family Game Fight!
- Fantasy Island
- I Can See Your Voice
- Next
- Small Fortune
- United States of Al
- When Nature Calls with Helen Mirren

Not returning from 2019–20:

- Carol's Second Act
- Evil (moved to Paramount+)
- The Good Place
- Madam Secretary
- Modern Family
- Schooled
- Single Parents
- Survivor (returned for 2021–22)
- Tommy
- Will & Grace

=== Cancellations/series endings ===
==== CBC ====
- Burden of Truth—Cancelled on March 18, 2021, after four seasons.
- Frankie Drake Mysteries—Cancelled on February 28, 2021, after four seasons. The series concluded on March 8, 2021.
- Kim's Convenience—It was announced on March 8, 2021, that season five would be the final season. The series concluded on April 13, 2021.
- Trickster—Cancelled on January 29, 2021.

==== Citytv ====
- Bless the Harts—Cancelled on April 1, 2021, by creator Fox, after two seasons. The series concluded on June 20, 2021.
- Brooklyn Nine-Nine—It was announced on February 11, 2021, by creator NBC that season eight would be the final season. The series concluded on September 16, 2021.
- Mixed-ish—Cancelled on May 14, 2021, by creator ABC, after two seasons. The series concluded on May 18, 2021.
- Mom—It was announced on February 17, 2021, by creator CBS that season eight would be the final season. The series concluded on May 13, 2021.
- The Twilight Zone—Cancelled on February 25, 2021, by creator Paramount+, after two seasons.

==== CTV/CTV2 ====
- All Rise—Cancelled on May 15, 2021, by creator CBS, after two seasons. The series concluded on May 24, 2021.
- American Housewife—Cancelled on May 14, 2021, by creator ABC, after five seasons.
- Filthy Rich—Cancelled on October 30, 2020, by creator Fox. The series concluded on November 30, 2020.
- For Life—Cancelled on May 14, 2021, by creator ABC, after two seasons.
- Holmes Family Effect—The documentary miniseries was meant to run for one season only; it concluded on March 23, 2021.
- L.A.'s Finest—Cancelled on October 14, 2020, by creator Charter Spectrum, after two seasons.
- Rebel—Cancelled on May 14, 2021, by creator ABC. The series concluded on June 10, 2021.

==== Global ====
- Call Your Mother—Cancelled on May 14, 2021, by creator ABC. The series concluded on May 19, 2021.
- Connecting—Cancelled on November 2, 2020, by creator NBC.
- MacGyver—It was announced on April 7, 2021, by creator CBS that season five would be the final season. The series concluded on April 30, 2021.
- Manhunt: Deadly Games—The anthology series was meant to run for one season only; it concluded on November 7, 2020.
- NCIS: New Orleans—It was announced on February 17, 2021, by creator CBS that season seven would be the final season. The series concluded on May 23, 2021.
- Next—Cancelled on October 30, 2020, by creator Fox. The series concluded on December 22, 2020.
- One Day at a Time—Cancelled on November 24, 2020, by creator Pop, after four seasons.
- Prodigal Son—Cancelled on May 10, 2021, by creator Fox, after two seasons. The series concluded on May 18, 2021.
- Superstore—It was announced on December 3, 2020, by creator NBC that season six would be the final season. The series concluded on March 25, 2021.
- The Unicorn—Cancelled on May 15, 2021, by creator CBS, after two seasons.

== Weekly ratings ==
Most-watched shows by week (single-network only)
Week of	Title	Network	Viewers (millions)	Ref.
August 31	CTV News at Six	CTV	1.52	
September 7	2020 NBA playoffs Eastern Conference Semifinals; Toronto Raptors games	TSN	1.96	
September 14	72nd Primetime Emmy Awards	CTV	1.66	
September 21	The Masked Singer	CTV	1.73	
September 28	The Masked Singer	CTV	2.08	
October 5	The Masked Singer	CTV	1.87	
October 12	The Masked Singer	CTV	2.08	
October 19	The Amazing Race	CTV	1.50	
October 26	The Masked Singer	CTV	1.86	
November 2	The Good Doctor	CTV	2.42	
November 9	The Good Doctor	CTV	2.53	
November 16	Grey's Anatomy	CTV	2.19	
November 23	The Good Doctor	CTV	2.27	
November 30	The Good Doctor	CTV	2.28	
December 7	NCIS	Global	2.03	
December 14	Grey's Anatomy	CTV	2.03	
December 21	2021 World Junior Ice Hockey Championships; Canada preliminary round games	TSN	1.96	
December 28	2021 World Junior Ice Hockey Championships; Canada quarterfinals game	TSN	2.86	
January 4	2021 World Junior Ice Hockey Championships; Canada semifinals & final games	TSN	3.05	
January 11	Wednesday Night Hockey	Sportsnet	2.13	
January 18	The Good Doctor	CTV	2.31	
January 25	The Good Doctor	CTV	2.26	
February 1	Super Bowl LV	CTV	7.77	
February 8	The Rookie	CTV	2.05	
February 15	The Good Doctor	CTV	2.18	
February 22	The Good Doctor	CTV	2.17	
March 1	Oprah with Meghan and Harry	Global	3.21	
March 8	The Good Doctor	CTV	2.42	
March 15	Grey's Anatomy	CTV	1.99	
March 22	The Good Doctor	CTV	2.20	
March 29	The Good Doctor	CTV	2.14	
April 5	Station 19	CTV	1.89	
April 12	The Rookie	CTV	2.12	
April 19	93rd Academy Awards	CTV	2.26	
April 26	The Rookie	CTV	2.16	
May 3	NCIS	Global	1.83	
May 10	9-1-1	Global	2.08	
May 17	The Good Doctor	CTV	2.03	
May 24	The Good Doctor	CTV	1.91	
May 31	2021 Stanley Cup playoffs Toronto Maple Leafs vs. Montreal Canadiens (game 7)	CBC	2.49	
June 7	The Good Doctor	CTV	2.04	
June 14	CTV News at Six	CTV	1.46	
June 21	CTV News at Six	CTV	1.45	
June 28	2021 Stanley Cup Finals (games 1–3)	CBC	1.81	
July 5	UEFA Euro 2020 Final	TSN	2.38	
July 12	CTV News at Six	CTV	1.40	
July 19	America's Got Talent	Citytv	1.40	
July 26	Olympic Games Primetime	CBC	1.39	
August 2	CTV News at Six	CTV	1.28	
August 9	CTV News at Six	CTV	1.34	
August 16	CTV News at Six	CTV	1.33	
August 23	Private Eyes	Global	1.36	

== See also ==
- 2020–21 United States network television schedule
