= 2019–20 Canadian network television schedule =

The 2019–20 network television schedule for the five major English commercial broadcast networks in Canada covers primetime hours from September 2019 through August 2020. The schedule is followed by a list per network of returning series, new series, and series canceled after the 2018–19 television season, for Canadian, American and other series.

CBC Television was first to announce its fall schedule on May 29, 2019, followed by Global and Citytv on May 30, and CTV and CTV 2 on June 6. As in the past, the commercial networks' announcements come shortly after the networks have had a chance to buy Canadian rights to new American series. CTV 2 and Global are not included on Saturday as they normally only schedule encore programming in primetime on Saturdays.

== Legend ==
Grey indicates encore programming.
Light green indicates sporting events.
Red indicates original Canadian programming.

== Schedule ==
- New series are highlighted in **bold**. Series that have changed network are not highlighted as new series.
- All times given are in Canadian Eastern Time and Pacific Time (except for some live events or specials, including most sports, which are given in Eastern Time).

=== Sunday ===
Network		7:00 p.m.	7:30 p.m.	8:00 p.m.	8:30 p.m.	9:00 p.m.	9:30 p.m.	10:00 p.m.	10:30 p.m.
CBC	Fall	Heartland		Anne		The Fifth Estate		The National	
CBC	Winter	**Endlings**		High Arctic Haulers		CBC Docs POV		The National	
CBC	Spring	**Find Me in Paris**		High Arctic Haulers		CBC Docs POV		The National	
Citytv	Fall	CityNews		The Simpsons	**Bless the Harts**	Bob's Burgers	Family Guy	Mom (R)	
Citytv	Winter	Little Big Shots		The Simpsons	**Duncanville**	Bob's Burgers	Family Guy	Mom (R)	
Citytv	Spring	Mom (R)		Celebrity Family Feud		Press Your Luck		**Vagrant Queen**	
CTV	Fall	NFL (continued to game completion)	SportsCentre	God Friended Me		Shark Tank		The Rookie	
CTV	Winter	The Big Bang Theory (R)		God Friended Me		**Zoey's Extraordinary Playlist**		The Rookie	
CTV	Spring	**I Do, Redo**		God Friended Me		**Zoey's Extraordinary Playlist**		The Rookie	
CTV	Late spring	**Marvel Sunday Night Movies**						Match Game	
CTV	Summer	Mary's Kitchen Crush	**Double Your Dish**	The Big Bang Theory (R)		Love Island		Criminal Minds (R)	
CTV 2	Fall	Football Night in America (joined in progress)			Sunday Night Football (continued to game completion)				
CTV 2	Winter	America's Got Talent: The Champions (R)				Shark Tank		Shark Tank (R)	
CTV 2	Spring	Question Period		American Idol				Motive (R)	
Global	Fall	Border Security; Canada's Front Line (R)		Kids Say the Darndest Things		NCIS: Los Angeles		Madam Secretary	
Global	Winter	Border Security; Canada's Front Line (R)		Kids Say the Darndest Things		NCIS: Los Angeles		NCIS: New Orleans	
Global	Summer	Border Security; Canada's Front Line (R)		Big Brother USA		NCIS: Los Angeles		NCIS: New Orleans	

=== Monday ===
Network		8:00 p.m.	8:30 p.m.	9:00 p.m.	9:30 p.m.	10:00 p.m.	10:30 p.m.
CBC	Fall	Murdoch Mysteries		Frankie Drake Mysteries		The National	
CBC	Winter	Murdoch Mysteries		Coroner		The National	
CBC	Spring	Murdoch Mysteries		**Wild Bill**		The National	
Citytv	Fall	Dancing with the Stars				**Bluff City Law**	
Citytv	Winter	The Bachelor				Manifest	
Citytv	Spring	**The Bachelor Presents: Listen to Your Heart**				**The Baker and the Beauty**	
Citytv	Summer	**The Bachelor: The Greatest Seasons- Ever!**					
CTV	Fall	The Conners	**Bob Hearts Abishola**	**All Rise**		The Good Doctor	
CTV	Winter	**9-1-1: Lone Star**		**All Rise**		The Good Doctor	
CTV	Spring	The Big Bang Theory (R)	**Bob Hearts Abishola**	**All Rise**		Cardinal	
CTV 2	Fall	The Voice				Criminal Minds (R)	
CTV 2	Winter	America's Got Talent: The Champions				The Goldbergs (R)	Seinfeld (R)
CTV 2	Spring	The Voice				The Goldbergs (R)	Seinfeld (R)
Global	Fall	9-1-1		**Prodigal Son**		Bull	
Global	Winter	**Nurses**		**Prodigal Son**		Bull	
Global	Summer	The Neighborhood (R)	Schooled	Private Eyes (R)		Bull	

- Note: Global aired The Neighborhood at 7:30 p.m. Eastern, outside of primetime hours.
- Note: CTV aired **Bob Hearts Abishola** at 7:30 p.m. Eastern, outside of winter primetime hours.
- Note: Citytv aired Songland at 7 p.m. Eastern, outside of spring primetime hours.

=== Tuesday ===
Network		8:00 p.m.	8:30 p.m.	9:00 p.m.	9:30 p.m.	10:00 p.m.	10:30 p.m.
CBC	Fall	Still Standing	22 Minutes	Baroness von Sketch Show		The National	
CBC	Winter	Kim's Convenience	22 Minutes	Schitt's Creek	Catastrophe	The National	
CBC	Late winter	Kim's Convenience	22 Minutes	Schitt's Creek	Workin' Moms	The National	
Citytv	Fall	Hudson & Rex		**Mixed-ish**	Black-ish	Mom (R)	
Citytv	Spring	America's Got Talent				Mom (R)	
CTV	Fall	The Resident		This Is Us		**Emergence**	
CTV	Late fall	The Resident		Ellen's Game of Games		**Emergence**	
CTV	Winter	The Resident		This Is Us		**For Life**	
CTV	Spring	Corner Gas (R)		Unforgettable		World of Dance	
CTV	Summer	Match Game (R)		Love Island		Unforgettable (R)	
CTV 2	Fall	The Voice		Seinfeld (R)	The Goldbergs (R)	Criminal Minds (R)	
CTV 2	Winter	**Pandora**		Seinfeld (R)	The Goldbergs (R)	Criminal Minds (R)	
CTV 2	Spring	The Voice		Seinfeld (R)	The Goldbergs (R)	Criminal Minds (R)	
Global		NCIS		FBI		New Amsterdam	

- Note: Global aired NCIS: New Orleans at 7 p.m. Eastern, outside of primetime hours.
- Note: CTV aired The Conners at 7:30 p.m. Eastern, outside of winter primetime hours.

=== Wednesday ===
Network		8:00 p.m.	8:30 p.m.	9:00 p.m.	9:30 p.m.	10:00 p.m.	10:30 p.m.
CBC	Fall	The Great Canadian Baking Show		**Northern Rescue**		The National	
CBC	Winter	Burden of Truth		Fortunate Son		The National	
CBC	Spring	Diggstown		Fortunate Son		The National	
Citytv	Fall	Chicago Med		Chicago Fire		Chicago P.D.	
Citytv	Spring	**The Moodys**	**The Moodys**	Hudson & Rex (R)		**Godfather of Harlem**	
CTV	Fall	The Masked Singer		**Almost Family**		**Stumptown**	
CTV	Winter	**Flirty Dancing**		Criminal Minds		**Stumptown**	
CTV	Spring	The Masked Singer		**Transplant**		**Stumptown**	
CTV	Mid-spring	The Masked Singer		**The Masked Singer: After the Mask**		**Transplant**	
CTV	Summer	Encore Programming		**Ultimate Tag**		Agents of S.H.I.E.L.D.	
CTV 2	Fall	The Goldbergs (R)	The Big Bang Theory (R)	Seinfeld (R)	The Goldbergs (R)	Criminal Minds (R)	
CTV 2	Winter	The Goldbergs (R)	The Big Bang Theory (R)	**Almost Family**		Criminal Minds (R)	
Global	Fall	Survivor: Island of the Idols		Modern Family	Single Parents	S.W.A.T.	
Global	Winter	**Undercover Boss USA**		Modern Family	Single Parents	S.W.A.T.	
Global	Spring	Big Brother Canada		Modern Family	Single Parents	S.W.A.T.	
Global	Summer	Big Brother USA		**Tough as Nails**		SEAL Team	

- Note: CTV aired The Goldbergs at 7:30 p.m. Eastern, outside of primetime hours.
- Note: Global airs **FBI: Most Wanted** at 7 p.m. Eastern, outside of winter primetime hours.

=== Thursday ===
Network		8:00 p.m.	8:30 p.m.	9:00 p.m.	9:30 p.m.	10:00 p.m.	10:30 p.m.
CBC	Fall	Battle of the Blades		Dragons' Den		The National	
CBC	Winter	Back in Time for Winter		The Detectives		The National	
CBC	Spring	**Fridge Wars**		**The Oland Murder**		The National	
Citytv	Fall	Mom	**Perfect Harmony**	A Million Little Things		**Four Weddings and a Funeral**	
Citytv	Winter	Mom	Brooklyn Nine-Nine	Mom	Perfect Harmony	A Million Little Things	
Citytv	Spring	**Council of Dads**		**Labor of Love**		Mom (R)	
CTV	Fall	Grey's Anatomy		How to Get Away with Murder		Law & Order: Special Victims Unit	
CTV	Winter	Station 19		Grey's Anatomy		Law & Order: Special Victims Unit	
CTV	Spring	**Who Wants To Be A Millionaire**		Station 19		Blindspot	
CTV	Summer	The Big Bang Theory (R)		In the Dark		Blindspot	
CTV	Late summer	The Big Bang Theory (R)		**United We Fall**	United We Fall	Law & Order: Special Victims Unit (R)	
CTV 2	Fall	Thursday Night Football (continued to game completion)					
CTV 2	Winter	The Goldbergs (R)	**Outmatched**	CTV Movie			
Global	Fall	Superstore	**The Unicorn**	The Good Place	Carol's Second Act	**Evil**	
Global	Mid-fall	Will & Grace	**The Unicorn**	The Good Place	Carol's Second Act	**Evil**	
Global	Winter	**The Unicorn**	The Good Place	Will & Grace	Carol's Second Act	**Evil**	
Global	Spring	Superstore	**The Unicorn**	Will & Grace	Carol's Second Act	**Tommy**	
Global	Summer	Big Brother USA		Border Security: America's Front Line		NCIS: Los Angeles (R)	

- Note: CTV aired Young Sheldon at 7:30 p.m. Eastern, outside of primetime hours.

=== Friday ===
Network		8:00 p.m.	8:30 p.m.	9:00 p.m.	9:30 p.m.	10:00 p.m.	10:30 p.m.
CBC	Fall	Marketplace	In the Making	The Nature of Things		The National	
CBC	Winter	Marketplace	**You Can't Ask That**	The Nature of Things		The National	
Citytv	Fall	**Fall in Love Fridays**				Hudson & Rex (R)	
Citytv	Winter	**Lincoln Rhyme: Hunt for the Bone Collector**		CityTV movie			
CTV	Fall	**L.A.'s Finest**		Magnum P.I.		Blue Bloods	
CTV	Winter	American Housewife	The Conners (R)	Magnum P.I.		Blue Bloods	
CTV	Summer	Shark Tank (R)		Love Island		Blue Bloods	
CTV 2	Fall	American Housewife	The Big Bang Theory (R)	CTV Movie			
CTV 2	Winter	The Goldbergs (R)	The Big Bang Theory (R)	CTV Movie			
Global	Fall	Hawaii Five-0		The Blacklist		SEAL Team	
Global	Winter	MacGyver		Hawaii Five-0		SEAL Team	
Global	Spring	MacGyver		The Blacklist		SEAL Team	

=== Saturday ===
Network		7:00 p.m.	7:30 p.m.	8:00 p.m.	8:30 p.m.	9:00 p.m.	9:30 p.m.	10:00 p.m.	10:30 p.m.
CBC	Fall	Hockey Night in Canada (doubleheader game 1)						Hockey Night in Canada (doubleheader game 2; continued to game completion)	
CBC	Spring	Encore Programming							
Citytv	Fall	Hockey Night in Canada						Encore Programming	
Citytv	Spring	Encore Programming							
CTV		W5		CTV Movie				The Big Bang Theory (R)	

== By network ==
=== CBC Television ===
Returning series:

- 22 Minutes
- Anne
- Back in Time for Winter
- Baroness von Sketch Show
- Battle of the Blades
- Burden of Truth
- Catastrophe
- Coroner
- The Detectives
- Diggstown
- Dragons' Den
- The Fifth Estate
- Fortunate Son
- Frankie Drake Mysteries
- The Great Canadian Baking Show
- Heartland
- High Arctic Haulers
- Hockey Night in Canada (shared with Citytv)
- In the Making
- Kim's Convenience
- Marketplace
- Murdoch Mysteries
- The National
- The Nature of Things
- Schitt's Creek
- Still Standing
- Workin' Moms

New series:

- Endlings
- Family Feud Canada (Note: Aired outside primetime broadcast hours on Weeknights at 7:30 p.m.)
- Find Me in Paris
- Fridge Wars
- Northern Rescue (Note: Canadian Broadcast television premiere; a CBC Gem series)
- The Oland Murder
- Wild Bill
- You Can't Ask That

Not returning from 2018–19:

- Cavendish
- Little Dog
- Mr. D
- Unspeakable
- Vanity Fair

=== Citytv ===
Returning series:

- America's Got Talent
- The Bachelor
- Black-ish
- Bob's Burgers
- Brooklyn Nine-Nine
- Celebrity Family Feud
- CityNews
- Chicago Fire (moved from Global)
- Chicago Med (moved from Global)
- Chicago P.D. (moved from Global)
- Dancing with the Stars
- Family Guy
- Hockey Night in Canada (shared with CBC)
- Hudson & Rex
- Little Big Shots
- Manifest
- A Million Little Things
- Mom
- Press Your Luck
- The Simpsons
- Songland

New series:

- The Bachelor: The Greatest Seasons- Ever!
- The Bachelor Presents: Listen to Your Heart
- The Baker and the Beauty
- Bless the Harts
- Bluff City Law
- Council of Dads
- Duncanville
- Fall in Love Fridays (Hallmark Channel original films)
- Four Weddings and a Funeral
- Godfather of Harlem
- Labor of Love
- Lincoln Rhyme: Hunt for the Bone Collector
- Mixed-ish
- Perfect Harmony
- Vagrant Queen
- The Moodys

Not returning from 2018–19:

- The Bletchley Circle: San Francisco (returning for 2020–21)
- Catch-22
- The Cool Kids
- The Gifted
- Hell's Kitchen (returning for 2020–21)
- Lethal Weapon
- Life in Pieces
- Mental Samurai (moved to CTV in 2020–21)
- Modern Family (moved to Global)
- The Murders
- Murphy Brown
- The Orville (moved to Star)
- Paradise Hotel
- Rel

=== CTV ===
Returning series:

- Agents of S.H.I.E.L.D.
- American Housewife (shared with CTV 2)
- American Idol (shared with CTV 2)
- Blindspot
- Blue Bloods
- Cardinal
- The Conners
- Criminal Minds
- Ellen's Game of Games
- God Friended Me
- Grey's Anatomy
- The Good Doctor
- How to Get Away with Murder
- In the Dark
- Law & Order: Special Victims Unit
- Love Island
- Magnum P.I.
- Mary's Kitchen Crush
- The Masked Singer
- Match Game
- NFL
- The Goldbergs
- The Resident
- The Rookie
- Shark Tank (shared with CTV 2)
- SportsCentre
- Station 19
- This Is Us
- Unforgettable (Note: Returned for the fourth season since 2014—15)
- World of Dance
- Young Sheldon

New series:

- 9-1-1: Lone Star
- All Rise
- Almost Family (shared with CTV 2)
- Bob Hearts Abishola
- Double Your Dish
- Emergence
- Flirty Dancing
- For Life
- I Do, Redo
- L.A.'s Finest
- Marvel Sunday Night Movies
- The Masked Singer: After the Mask
- Stumptown
- Transplant
- Ultimate Tag
- Who Wants to Be a Millionaire
- Zoey's Extraordinary Playlist
- United We Fall

Not returning from 2018–19:

- The Alec Baldwin Show
- The Amazing Race Canada (returned for 2021–22)
- The Amazing Race USA (returned for 2020–21)
- The Enemy Within
- The Fix
- Jann (returned for 2020–21)
- The Kids Are Alright
- MasterChef Canada (returned for 2020–21)
- MasterChef Junior (returned for 2021–22)
- MasterChef USA (returned for 2020–21)
- The Village
- Whiskey Cavalier

=== CTV 2 ===
Returning series:

- American Housewife (shared with CTV)
- American Idol (shared with CTV)
- America's Got Talent: The Champions
- Football Night in America
- Shark Tank (shared with CTV)
- Sunday Night Football
- The Voice

New series:

- Almost Family (shared with CTV)
- Outmatched
- Pandora

Not returning from 2018–19:

- Carter
- For the People
- Gotham
- Splitting Up Together

=== Global ===
Returning series:

- 9-1-1
- Big Brother Canada
- Big Brother USA
- Bull
- The Good Place
- Hawaii Five-0
- MacGyver
- Madam Secretary
- Modern Family (moved from Citytv)
- NCIS
- NCIS: Los Angeles
- NCIS: New Orleans
- The Neighborhood
- New Amsterdam
- Schooled (Note: The series' second season released first on the network's SVOD service before its Summer broadcast premiere.)
- SEAL Team
- Single Parents
- Superstore
- Survivor
- S.W.A.T.
- The Titan Games
- Will & Grace

New series:

- Carol's Second Act
- Crime Beat
- Evil
- FBI: Most Wanted
- Kids Say the Darndest Things
- Nurses
- Prodigal Son
- Tommy
- Tough as Nails
- Undercover Boss USA
- The Unicorn

Not returning from 2018–19:

- BH90210
- Blood & Treasure (returning for 2021–22)
- Celebrity Big Brother
- Chicago Fire (moved to Citytv)
- Chicago Med (moved to Citytv)
- Chicago P.D. (moved to Citytv)
- Dancing with the Stars: Juniors
- Elementary
- Happy Together
- Holey Moley (moved to CTV in 2020–21)
- I Feel Bad
- The InBetween
- Instinct
- Mary Kills People

== Renewals and cancellations ==
=== Renewals ===
==== CBC Television ====
- 22 Minutes—Renewed for a twenty-eighth season on May 27, 2020.
- Baroness von Sketch Show—Renewed for a fifth and final season on May 21, 2020.
- Battle of the Blades—Renewed for a sixth season on May 27, 2020.
- Burden of Truth—Renewed for a fourth season on July 21, 2020.
- Coroner—Renewed for a third season on May 28, 2020.
- Diggstown—Renewed for a third season on July 21, 2020.
- Dragons' Den—Renewed for a fifteenth season of May 27, 2020.
- Frankie Drake Mysteries—Renewed for a fourth season on May 27, 2020.
- The Great Canadian Baking Show—Renewed for a fourth season on May 27, 2020.
- Heartland—Renewed for a fourteenth season on May 27, 2020.
- Kim's Convenience—Renewed for a fifth and sixth season on April 2, 2020.
- Marketplace—Renewed for a forty-seventh season on May 27, 2020.
- Murdoch Mysteries—Renewed for a fourteenth season on May 13, 2020.
- The Nature of Things—Renewed for a sixtieth season on May 27, 2020.
- Workin' Moms—Renewed for a fifth season on May 27, 2020.
- You Can't Ask That—Renewed for a second season of May 27, 2020.

==== Citytv ====
- A Million Little Things—Renewed for a third season on June 22, 2020.
- Bless the Harts—Renewed for a second season on June 22, 2020.
- Bob's Burgers—Renewed for an eleventh season on June 22, 2020.
- Brooklyn Nine-Nine—Renewed for an eighth and final season on June 22, 2020.
- Chicago Fire—Renewed for a ninth season on June 22, 2020.
- Chicago Med—Renewed for a sixth season on June 22, 2020.
- Chicago P.D.—Renewed for an eighth season on June 22, 2020.
- Dancing with the Stars—Renewed for a twenty-ninth season on June 22, 2020.
- Fall in Love Fridays—Renewed for a second season on June 22, 2020.
- Family Guy—Renewed for a nineteenth season on June 22, 2020.
- Hudson & Rex—Renewed for a third season on June 16, 2020.
- Manifest—Renewed for a third season on June 22, 2020.
- Mom—Renewed for an eighth and final season on June 22, 2020.
- The Simpsons—Renewed for a thirty-second season on June 22, 2020.

==== CTV ====
- All Rise—Renewed for a second season on June 23, 2020.
- Blue Bloods—Renewed for an eleventh season on June 23, 2020.
- Bob Hearts Abishola—Renewed for a second season on June 23, 2020.
- The Conners—Renewed for a second season on June 23, 2020.
- The Good Doctor—Renewed for a fourth season on June 23, 2020.
- Grey's Anatomy—Renewed for a seventeenth season on June 23, 2020.
- Law & Order: Special Victims Unit—Renewed for a twenty-second season on June 23, 2020.
- Magnum P.I.—Renewed for a third season on June 23, 2020.
- The Masked Singer—Renewed for a fourth season on June 23, 2020.
- The Rookie—Renewed for a third season on June 23, 2020.
- Shark Tank—Renewed for a twelfth season on June 23, 2020.
- Station 19—Renewed for a fourth season on June 23, 2020.
- This Is Us—Renewed for a fifth season on June 23, 2020.
- Who Wants to Be a Millionaire—Renewed for a second season on June 23, 2020.
- Young Sheldon—Renewed for a fourth season on June 23, 2020.

==== Global ====
- 9-1-1—Renewed for a fourth season on June 23, 2020.
- The Blacklist—Renewed for an eighth season on June 23, 2020.
- Bull—Renewed for a fifth season on June 23, 2020.
- FBI—Renewed for a third season on June 23, 2020.
- FBI: Most Wanted—Renewed for a second season on June 23, 2020.
- MacGyver—Renewed for a fifth season on June 23, 2020.
- NCIS—Renewed for an eighteenth season on June 23, 2020.
- NCIS: Los Angeles—Renewed for a twelfth season on June 23, 2020.
- NCIS: New Orleans—Renewed for a seventh and final season on June 23, 2020.
- The Neighborhood—Renewed for a third season on June 23, 2020.
- New Amsterdam—Renewed for a third season on June 23, 2020.
- Nurses—Renewed for a second season on June 23, 2020.
- Prodigal Son—Renewed for a second season on June 23, 2020.
- SEAL Team—Renewed for a fourth season on June 23, 2020.
- Survivor—Renewed for a forty-fifth season on June 23, 2020.
- S.W.A.T.—Renewed for a fourth season on June 23, 2020.
- The Unicorn—Renewed for a second season on June 23, 2020.

=== Cancellations/series endings ===
==== CBC Television ====
- Anne—Canceled on November 25, 2019, after three seasons.
- Catastrophe—Concluded on February 12, 2019, after four seasons.
- The Oland Murder—The documentary miniseries was meant to run for one season only.
- Schitt's Creek—It was announced on March 21, 2019, that season six would be the final season. The series concluded on April 7, 2020.
- Wild Bill—Canceled on November 13, 2019, by creator ITV. The series concluded on May 11, 2020.

==== Citytv ====
- The Baker and the Beauty—Canceled on June 15, 2020, by creator ABC.
- Bluff City Law—Canceled on June 16, 2020, by creator NBC.
- Council of Dads—Canceled on June 25, 2020, by creator NBC.
- Four Weddings and a Funeral—The miniseries was meant to run for one season only; it concluded on November 28, 2019.
- Lincoln Rhyme: Hunt for the Bone Collector—Canceled on June 10, 2020, by creator NBC.
- Perfect Harmony—Canceled on June 10, 2020, by creator NBC.
- Vagrant Queen—Canceled on June 26, 2020, by creator Syfy.

==== CTV ====
- Agents of S.H.I.E.L.D.—It was announced on July 18, 2019, by creator ABC that season seven would be the final season. The series concluded on August 12, 2020.
- Blindspot—It was announced on May 17, 2019, by creator NBC that season five would be the final season. The series concluded on July 23, 2020.
- Cardinal—It was announced in April 2019 that season four would be the final season. The series concluded on May 11, 2020.
- Criminal Minds—It was announced on January 10, 2019, by creator CBS that season fifteen would be the final season. The series concluded on February 19, 2020.
- Emergence—Canceled on May 21, 2020, by creator ABC.
- Flirty Dancing—Canceled on January 11, 2020, by creator Fox. The series concluded on January 25, 2020.
- God Friended Me—Canceled on April 14, 2020, by creator CBS, after two seasons. The series concluded on April 26, 2020.
- How to Get Away with Murder—It was announced on July 11, 2019, by creator ABC that season six would be the final season. The series concluded on May 14, 2020.
- I Do, Redo—On June 13, 2020, CTV pulled the series from its prime-time schedule.

==== CTV 2 ====
- Almost Family—Canceled on March 2, 2020, by creator Fox.
- Outmatched—Canceled on May 19, 2020, by creator Fox.

==== Global ====
- Carol's Second Act—Canceled on May 6, 2020, by creator CBS.
- The Good Place—It was announced on June 7, 2019, by creator NBC that season four would be the final season. The series concluded on January 30, 2020.
- Hawaii Five-0—It was announced on February 28, 2020, by creator CBS that season ten would be the final season. The series concluded on April 3, 2020.
- Madam Secretary—It was announced on May 15, 2019, by creator CBS that season six would be the final season. The series concluded on December 8, 2019.
- Modern Family—It was announced on February 5, 2019, by creator ABC that season eleven would be the final season. The series concluded on April 8, 2020.
- Schooled—Canceled on May 21, 2020, by creator ABC, after two seasons.
- Single Parents—Canceled on May 21, 2020, by creator ABC, after two seasons.
- Tommy—Canceled on May 6, 2020, by creator CBS.
- Will & Grace—It was announced on July 25, 2019, by creator NBC that season eleven would be the final season. The series concluded on April 23, 2020.

== Weekly ratings ==
Most-watched shows by week
Week of	Title	Network	Viewers (millions)	Ref.
August 26	The Amazing Race Canada	CTV	2.02	
September 2	The Amazing Race Canada	CTV	1.86	
September 9	The Amazing Race Canada	CTV	2.13	
September 16	71st Primetime Emmy Awards	CTV	1.82	
September 23	The Good Doctor	CTV	2.59	
September 30	The Good Doctor	CTV	2.44	
October 7	The Good Doctor	CTV	2.39	
October 14	The Good Doctor	CTV	2.21	
October 21	2019 Canadian federal election coverage	CBC	2.12	
October 28	Survivor	Global	2.13	
November 4	The Good Doctor	CTV	2.28	
November 11	The Good Doctor	CTV	2.46	
November 18	107th Grey Cup	TSN	3.67	
November 25	The Good Doctor	CTV	2.31	
December 2	The Good Doctor	CTV	2.53	
December 9	Survivor	Global	1.98	
December 16	NCIS	Global	1.89	
December 23	2019 World Junior Ice Hockey Championships; Canada preliminary round games	TSN	1.89	
December 30	77th Golden Globe Awards	CTV	3.01	
January 6	NCIS	Global	1.90	
January 13	The Good Doctor	CTV	2.48	
January 20	Station 19	CTV	2.55	
January 27	Super Bowl LIV	CTV	7.91	
February 3	92nd Academy Awards	CTV	4.81	
February 10	The Good Doctor	CTV	2.23	
February 17	The Good Doctor	CTV	2.41	
February 24	The Good Doctor	CTV	2.64	
March 2	The Good Doctor	CTV	2.63	
March 9	The Good Doctor	CTV	2.49	
March 16	Survivor	Global	2.21	
March 23	The Good Doctor	CTV	2.68	
March 30	The Good Doctor	CTV	3.03	
April 6	Grey's Anatomy	CTV	2.25	
April 13	One World: Together at Home	CTV	3.13	
April 20	Stronger Together, Tous Ensemble	CTV	3.23	
April 27	Survivor	Global	2.30	
May 4	9-1-1	Global	2.32	
May 11	9-1-1	Global	2.41	
May 18	The Masked Singer	CTV	1.98	
May 25	CTV News at Six	CTV	1.74	
June 1	CTV News at Six	CTV	1.65	
June 8	CTV News at Six	CTV	1.71	
June 15	CTV News at Six	CTV	1.63	
June 22	America's Got Talent	Citytv	1.57	
June 29	CTV News at Six	CTV	1.48	
July 6	CTV News at Six	CTV	1.55	
July 13	CTV News at Six	CTV	1.54	
July 20	CTV News at Six	CTV	1.47	
July 27	CTV News at Six	CTV	1.44	
August 3	CTV News at Six	CTV	1.43	
August 10	CTV News at Six	CTV	1.37	
August 17	CTV News at Six	CTV	1.44	
August 24	CTV News at Six	CTV	1.45	

== See also ==
- 2019–20 United States network television schedule
- Impact of the COVID-19 pandemic on television
