= 2021–22 Canadian network television schedule =

Television schedule for the five major English commercial broadcast networks in Canada

The 2021–22 network television schedule for the five major English commercial broadcast networks in Canada covers primetime hours from September 2021 through August 2022. The schedule is followed by a list per network of returning series, new series, and series cancelled after the 2020–21 television season, for Canadian, American and other series. CBC was first to announce its fall schedule on June 2, 2021, followed by Citytv and Global on June 8, and CTV on June 10. Yes TV, indieNET and Omni Television are not included as member television stations have local flexibility over most of their schedules. CTV 2 is not included on Friday or Saturday as it normally only schedules encore programming in primetime on Fridays and Saturdays.

== Legend ==
- Grey indicates encore programming.
- Blue-grey indicates news programming.
- Light green indicates sporting events/coverage.
- Light purple indicates movies.
- Red indicates Canadian content shows, which is programming that originated in Canada.
- Light yellow indicates the current schedule.

== Schedule ==
- New series to Canadian television are highlighted in **bold**.
- All times given are in Canadian Eastern Time and Pacific Time (except for some live events or specials, including most sports, which are given in Eastern Time). Subtract one hour for Central time for most programs (excluding CBC). Airtimes may vary in the Atlantic and Mountain times and do not necessarily align with U.S. stations in the Mountain time zone. Add one half-hour to Atlantic Time schedule for Newfoundland time. (See also: Effects of time zones on North American broadcasting)
- Dates (e.g., (9/13)) indicate the first month and day of a program in its regular timeslot, not necessarily the premiere date.

=== Sunday ===
Network		7:00 p.m.	7:30 p.m.	8:00 p.m.	8:30 p.m.	9:00 p.m.	9:30 p.m.	10:00 p.m.	10:30 p.m.
CBC	Fall	Heartland		The Great Canadian Baking Show		**A Suitable Boy**		The National	
CBC	Winter	**All Creatures Great and Small** (1/2)		Hot Docs on CBC (1/2)				The National	
Citytv	Fall	Mom (R)		**Bachelor in Paradise Canada**			**The Bachelor After Show: After Paradise**	Mom (R)	
Citytv	Winter	Mom (R)		American Idol (2/27)				Mom (R)	
Citytv	Late spring	Mom (R)	Duncanville (5/8)	American Idol (2/27)				Mom (R)	
Citytv	Summer	Mom (R)		Celebrity Family Feud (7/10)		**The Final Straw** (7/10)		Mom (R)	
CTV	Early fall	NFL overrun (continued to game completion)	NFL on CTV Live	Celebrity Wheel of Fortune		Supermarket Sweep		The Rookie	
CTV	Fall	NFL overrun (continued to game completion)	NFL on CTV Live	Celebrity Wheel of Fortune		The Big Bang Theory (R)		The Rookie	
CTV	Spring	The Big Bang Theory (R)		MasterChef Junior (3/20)		Weakest Link (3/13)		The Rookie	
CTV	Summer	Who Do You Think You Are? (7/10)		The Amazing Race Canada (R) (7/10)		Wipeout (7/10)		The $100,000 Pyramid (7/10)	
CTV 2		The Big Bang Theory (R)		Football Night in America	NBC Sunday Night Football				
Global	Fall	60 Minutes		The Equalizer		NCIS: Los Angeles		SEAL Team	
Global	Winter	60 Minutes		The Equalizer		NCIS: Los Angeles		S.W.A.T. (1/2)	
Global	Summer	60 Minutes		Big Brother (7/10)		The Equalizer (R)		NCIS: Los Angeles (R)	

=== Monday ===
Network		7:00 p.m.	7:30 p.m.	8:00 p.m.	8:30 p.m.	9:00 p.m.	9:30 p.m.	10:00 p.m.	10:30 p.m.
CBC	Fall	Coronation Street	Family Feud Canada	Murdoch Mysteries		Victoria		The National	
CBC	Winter	Coronation Street	Family Feud Canada	Murdoch Mysteries		**The Witness for the Prosecution** (1/3)		The National	
CBC	Late winter	Coronation Street	Family Feud Canada	Murdoch Mysteries		**The Porter** (2/21)		The National	
Citytv	Fall	Mom (R)	Mom (R)	Dancing with the Stars				**Ordinary Joe**	
Citytv	Winter	**That's My Jam** (1/3)		The Bachelor (1/3)				**Ordinary Joe**	
Citytv	Spring	Mom (R)	Mom (R)	American Idol (3/21)				**The Endgame** (2/21)	
Citytv	Summer	Mom (R)	Mom (R)	Don't Forget the Lyrics! (5/23)		Beat Shazam (5/23)		Mom (R)	Mom (R)
Citytv	Mid Summer	Don't Forget the Lyrics! (7/11)		The Bachelorette (7/11)				Beat Shazam (7/11)	
CTV	Fall	Jann	Bob Hearts Abishola	The Voice				The Good Doctor	
CTV	Winter	Etalk	Bob Hearts Abishola	9-1-1: Lone Star (1/3)		**The Cleaning Lady** (1/3)		Transplant (1/3)	
CTV	Spring	Etalk	The Big Bang Theory (R)	Call Me Kat (R)	Bob Hearts Abishola	9-1-1: Lone Star		The Good Doctor	
CTV	Summer	Etalk	The Big Bang Theory (R)	American Ninja Warrior (5/30)				Weakest Link (6/6)	
CTV	Mid-Summer	Etalk	The Big Bang Theory (R)	American Ninja Warrior (5/30)				**Claim to Fame** (7/11)	
CTV 2	Fall	The Big Bang Theory (R)	Etalk	Young Sheldon (R)		**The Big Leap**		Criminal Minds (R)	
CTV 2	Winter	The Big Bang Theory (R)	Etalk	**America's Got Talent: Extreme** (2/28)				**All American: Homecoming** (2/28)	
CTV 2	Spring	The Big Bang Theory (R)	Etalk	Ghost Whisperer (R)		**All American: Homecoming**		Criminal Minds (R)	
Global	Fall	ET Canada	The Neighborhood	9-1-1		NCIS		**NCIS: Hawaiʻi**	
Global	Winter	ET	ET Canada	The Neighborhood (1/3)	United States of Al (1/10)	NCIS		**NCIS: Hawaiʻi**	
Global	Spring	Big Brother Canada (3/21)		9-1-1 (3/21)		NCIS		**NCIS: Hawaiʻi**	

=== Tuesday ===
Network		7:00 p.m.	7:30 p.m.	8:00 p.m.	8:30 p.m.	9:00 p.m.	9:30 p.m.	10:00 p.m.	10:30 p.m.
CBC	Fall	Coronation Street	Family Feud Canada	22 Minutes	**Strays**	**Moonshine**		The National	
CBC	Late fall	Coronation Street	Family Feud Canada	22 Minutes	**Strays**	**Sort Of** (11/9)	**Sort Of** (11/9)	The National	
CBC	Winter	Coronation Street	Family Feud Canada	22 Minutes	**Son of a Critch** (1/4)	Workin' Moms (1/4)	TallBoyz (1/4)	The National	
Citytv	Fall	Mom (R)	Mom (R)	The Bachelorette				Mom (R)	Mom (R)
Citytv	Winter	Mom (R)	Mom (R)	**American Auto** (1/4)	**Grand Crew** (1/4)	Kenan (1/4)	Black-ish (1/4)	Mom (R)	Mom (R)
Citytv	Spring	Young Rock (3/15)	Mr. Mayor (3/15)	Canada's Got Talent (3/22)		Hudson & Rex (3/22)		Black-ish (3/22)	Mom (R)
Citytv	Summer	The Chase		America's Got Talent (5/31)				Mom (R)	Mom (R)
CTV	Fall	Etalk	The Big Bang Theory (R)	The Resident		**La Brea**		**Queens**	
CTV	Winter	Etalk	The Big Bang Theory (R)	**Judge Steve Harvey** (1/4)		This Is Us (1/4)		**Queens**	
CTV	Mid-winter	Etalk	The Big Bang Theory (R)	The Resident		**The Real Dirty Dancing** (2/8)		**Queens**	
CTV	Late winter	Etalk	The Big Bang Theory (R)	The Resident		This Is Us		Transplant (3/1)	
CTV	Summer	Etalk	The Big Bang Theory (R)	Holey Moley (5/24)		The Big Bang Theory (R) (5/31)	The Big Bang Theory (R) (5/31)	**Dancing with Myself** (5/31)	
CTV	Later summer	Etalk	The Big Bang Theory (R)	Holey Moley (5/24)		The Amazing Race Canada (7/5)		**Password** (8/9)	
CTV 2		The Big Bang Theory (R)	Etalk	The Voice		**Our Kind of People**		**Walker**	
Global	Fall/Winter	FBI: Most Wanted		FBI		**FBI: International**		New Amsterdam	
Global	Late winter	FBI: Most Wanted		FBI		**FBI: International**		**The Thing About Pam** (3/8)	
Global	Spring	FBI: Most Wanted		FBI		**FBI: International**		New Amsterdam (4/19)	

=== Wednesday ===
Network		7:00 p.m.	7:30 p.m.	8:00 p.m.	8:30 p.m.	9:00 p.m.	9:30 p.m.	10:00 p.m.	10:30 p.m.
CBC	Fall	Coronation Street	Family Feud Canada	War of the Worlds		Diggstown		The National	
CBC	Winter	Coronation Street	Family Feud Canada	Still Standing (1/5)	**Run the Burbs** (1/5)	Pretty Hard Cases (1/5)		The National	
Citytv	Fall	Mom (R)		Chicago Med		Chicago Fire		Chicago P.D.	
Citytv	Summer	Mom (R)		America's Got Talent (8/10)		So You Think You Can Dance		Mom (R)	
CTV	Fall	Etalk	**The Wonder Years**	The Masked Singer		The Conners	Home Economics	**Alter Ego**	
CTV	Winter	The Amazing Race (1/12)		**Children Ruin Everything** (1/12)	The Wonder Years (1/12)	The Conners	Home Economics	**Next Level Chef** (1/5)	
CTV	Spring	Etalk	**The Wonder Years**	The Masked Singer		The Conners	Home Economics	**Domino Masters** (3/16)	
CTV	Summer	Etalk	The Big Bang Theory (R)	MasterChef		**The Challenge: USA** (7/13)		The Big Bang Theory (R)	The Big Bang Theory (R)
CTV 2	Fall	The Big Bang Theory (R)	Etalk	The Goldbergs	The Goldbergs (R)	In the Dark		Criminal Minds (R)	
CTV 2	Spring	The Big Bang Theory (R)	Etalk	The Goldbergs	The Goldbergs (R)	Kung Fu (3/9)		Criminal Minds (R)	
Global	Fall	ET	ET Canada	Survivor		Tough as Nails		**CSI: Vegas**	
Global	Winter	ET	ET Canada	I Can See Your Voice (1/5)		**Abbott Elementary** (1/5)	**Ghosts** (R)	**Good Sam**	
Global	Late winter	ET	ET Canada	Celebrity Big Brother (2/2)		I Can See Your Voice		**Good Sam**	
Global	Spring	Big Brother Canada (3/9)		Survivor (3/9)		**Beyond the Edge** (3/16)		**Good Sam**	
Global	Summer	ET	ET Canada	Big Brother (7/13)		Departure (7/13)		Family Law (R)	

=== Thursday ===
Network		7:00 p.m.	7:30 p.m.	8:00 p.m.	8:30 p.m.	9:00 p.m.	9:30 p.m.	10:00 p.m.	10:30 p.m.
CBC	Fall	Coronation Street	Family Feud Canada	**Race Against the Tide**		The Nature of Things (R)		The National	
CBC	Late fall	Coronation Street	Family Feud Canada	Dragon's Den (10/14)		The Fifth Estate (10/14)		The National	
CBC	Winter	Coronation Street	Family Feud Canada	Coroner (1/6)		The Fifth Estate (10/14)		The National	
CBC	Spring	Coronation Street	Family Feud Canada	Coroner (1/6)		Evil By Design: Surviving Nygard (3/17)		The National	
Citytv	Fall	Encore programming		Law & Order: Special Victims Unit		Encore programming		Law & Order: Organized Crime	
Citytv	Late fall	Encore programming		Hudson & Rex		Law & Order: Special Victims Unit		Law & Order: Organized Crime	
Citytv	Winter	Encore programming		Law & Order (2/24)		Law & Order: Special Victims Unit		Law & Order: Organized Crime	
Citytv	Summer	Encore programming		Press Your Luck (7/7)		Encore programming			
CTV	Fall	B Positive	Young Sheldon	Station 19		Grey's Anatomy		Big Sky	
CTV	Winter	B Positive	Young Sheldon	**Joe Millionaire: For Richer or Poorer** (1/13)		Call Me Kat (1/13)	**Pivoting** (1/13)	**The Unusual Suspects**	
CTV	Spring	Call Me Kat	Young Sheldon	Station 19		Grey's Anatomy		Big Sky	
CTV	Summer	Etalk	The Big Bang Theory (R)	Young Sheldon (R)	Children Ruin Everything (R)	**Generation Gap** (7/7)		Transplant (R)	
CTV 2	Fall	The Big Bang Theory (R)	Thursday Night Football (10/7)						
Global	Fall	ET	ET Canada	The Blacklist		**Ghosts**	United States of Al	Bull	
Global	Winter	ET Canada	**Ghosts** (1/6)	**Women of the Movement** (1/6)				Bull	
Global	Late winter	ET	ET Canada	FBI: Most Wanted (R)		**Ghosts**	**Abbott Elementary**	Bull	
Global	Spring	ET	ET Canada	Big Brother Canada (3/3)		**Ghosts**	**How We Roll** (3/31)	Bull	
Global	Summer	ET	ET Canada	Border Security: Canada's Front Line (R)		Big Brother (7/14)		CSI: Vegas (R)	

=== Friday ===
Network		7:00 p.m.	7:30 p.m.	8:00 p.m.	8:30 p.m.	9:00 p.m.	9:30 p.m.	10:00 p.m.	10:30 p.m.
CBC	Fall	Coronation Street		Marketplace	**Travel Man: 48 Hours In...**	The Passionate Eye		The National	
CBC	Late fall	Coronation Street		Marketplace	**Travel Man: 48 Hours In...**	The Nature of Things		The National	
CBC	Winter	Coronation Street		Marketplace	Arctic Vets (1/7)	The Nature of Things		The National	
Citytv		Mom (R)		Fall in Love Fridays				Hudson & Rex (R)	
CTV		Etalk	The Big Bang Theory (R)	Shark Tank		Magnum P.I.		Blue Bloods	
Global	Fall	ET	ET Canada	S.W.A.T.		**Family Law**		Crime Beat	
Global	Winter	ET	ET Canada	The Blacklist (1/7)		Border Security: America's Front Line (R)		Crime Beat	
Global	Spring	ET	ET Canada	**Come Dance with Me** (4/15)		The Blacklist		Crime Beat	

=== Saturday ===
Network	7:00 p.m.	7:30 p.m.	8:00 p.m.	8:30 p.m.	9:00 p.m.	9:30 p.m.	10:00 p.m.	10:30 p.m.
CBC	Hockey Night in Canada							
Citytv	Hockey Night in Canada						Hudson & Rex (R)	
CTV	W5		CTV Movie				Discovery Channel programming (R)	
Global	The New Reality	ET Canada Weekend		Border Security: America's Front Line (R)	Border Security: Canada's Front Line (R)		48 Hours	

== By network ==
=== CBC ===
Returning series:

- 22 Minutes
- Arctic Vets
- Coroner
- Diggstown
- Dragon's Den
- Family Feud Canada
- The Fifth Estate
- The Great Canadian Baking Show
- Halifax Comedy Fest
- Heartland
- Hot Docs at Home
- Marketplace
- Murdoch Mysteries
- The National
- The Passionate Eye
- Pretty Hard Cases
- The Nature of Things
- The New Wave of Standup
- Still Standing
- TallBoyz
- Victoria
- War of the Worlds
- Winnipeg Comedy Festival
- Workin' Moms

New series:

- Moonshine
- The Porter
- Race Against the Tide
- Run the Burbs
- Son of a Critch
- Sort Of
- Strays
- A Suitable Boy
- Travel Man: 48 Hours In...

Not returning from 2020–21:

- Baroness von Sketch Show
- Battle of the Blades
- Burden of Truth
- Frankie Drake Mysteries
- Kim's Convenience
- Trickster

=== Citytv ===
Returning series:

- American Idol
- America's Got Talent
- The Bachelorette
- Bachelor in Paradise (USA)
- Black-ish
- Canada's Got Talent (returning from 2011–12)
- Chicago Fire
- Chicago Med
- Chicago P.D.
- Dancing with the Stars
- Duncanville
- Fall in Love Fridays
- Hudson & Rex
- Hockey Night In Canada
- Kenan
- Law & Order
- Law & Order: Organized Crime
- Law & Order: Special Victims Unit (moved from CTV)
- Mr. Mayor
- So You Think You Can Dance (new to Citytv)
- Young Rock

New series:

- American Auto
- The Bachelor After Show
- Bachelor in Paradise Canada
- The Endgame
- Grand Crew
- Ordinary Joe
- That's My Jam

Not returning from 2020–21:

- Bless the Harts
- Bob's Burgers (moved to Disney+, returning to Citytv in 2023-24)
- Brooklyn Nine-Nine
- Card Sharks
- Family Guy (moved to Disney+, returning to Citytv in 2023-24)
- The Great North (moved to Disney+, returning to Citytv in 2023-24)
- Manifest (moved to Netflix)
- A Million Little Things (moved to W Network)
- Mixed-ish
- Mom
- The Republic of Sarah
- The Simpsons (moved to Disney+, returning to Citytv in 2023-24)
- The Twilight Zone

=== CTV/CTV 2 ===
Returning series:

- 9-1-1: Lone Star
- The Amazing Race (USA)
- The Amazing Race Canada (returning from 2018–19)
- B Positive
- Big Sky
- Blue Bloods
- Bob Hearts Abishola
- Call Me Kat
- Celebrity Wheel of Fortune (moved from Yes TV)
- The Conners
- Etalk
- The Goldbergs
- The Good Doctor
- Grey's Anatomy
- Holey Moley
- Home Economics
- Jann
- Kung Fu
- Magnum P.I.
- MasterChef
- MasterChef Junior (returning from 2018–19)
- The Masked Singer
- The Resident
- The Rookie
- Shark Tank
- Station 19
- Supermarket Sweep
- This Is Us
- Transplant (returning from 2019–20)
- The Voice
- W5
- Weakest Link
- Young Sheldon

New series:

- AGT: Extreme
- All American: Homecoming
- Alter Ego
- The Big Leap
- Children Ruin Everything
- The Cleaning Lady
- Dancing with Myself
- Domino Masters
- Joe Millionaire: For Richer or Poorer
- Judge Steve Harvey
- La Brea
- Next Level Chef
- Our Kind of People
- Password
- Pivoting
- Queens
- The Real Dirty Dancing
- The Unusual Suspects
- The Wonder Years

Not returning from 2020–21:

- All Rise
- American Housewife
- The Celebrity Dating Game
- Ellen's Game of Games
- Filthy Rich
- For Life
- Holmes Family Effect
- HouseBroken
- L.A.'s Finest
- Law & Order: Special Victims Unit (moved to Citytv)
- MasterChef Canada
- Match Game
- Rebel
- The Masked Dancer

=== Global ===
Returning series:

- 9-1-1
- 48 Hours
- 60 Minutes
- Big Brother Canada
- The Blacklist
- Bull
- Celebrity Big Brother
- Crime Beat
- Departure
- The Equalizer
- ET
- ET Canada
- FBI: Most Wanted
- NCIS
- NCIS: Los Angeles
- The Neighborhood
- New Amsterdam
- The New Reality
- SEAL Team
- Survivor (returning from 2019–20)
- S.W.A.T.
- Tough as Nails
- United States of Al

New series:

- Abbott Elementary
- Beyond the Edge
- Come Dance with Me
- CSI: Vegas
- Family Law
- FBI: International
- Ghosts
- Good Sam
- How We Roll
- NCIS: Hawaiʻi
- The Thing About Pam
- Women of the Movement

Not returning from 2020–21:

- Call Your Mother
- Connecting
- MacGyver
- NCIS: New Orleans
- Next
- One Day at a Time
- Private Eyes
- Prodigal Son
- Superstore
- The Unicorn

=== Renewals ===
==== CBC ====
- Moonshine—Renewed for a second season on November 10, 2021.
- Sort Of—Renewed for a second season on February 25, 2022.
- Son of a Critch—Renewed for a second season on February 28, 2022.

==== CTV/CTV 2 ====
- The Amazing Race—Renewed for a thirty-fourth season on March 9, 2022.
- The Amazing Race Canada—Renewed for a ninth season on November 28, 2022.
- Children Ruin Everything—Renewed for a second season on February 4, 2022.
- Transplant—Renewed for a third season on February 17, 2022.

==== Global ====
- Departure—Renewed for a third season on May 27, 2021.
- Family Law—Renewed for a second season on May 27, 2021.

=== Cancellations/series endings ===
==== Citytv ====
- Black-ish—It was announced on May 14, 2021, by creator ABC that season eight would be the final season. The series concluded on April 19, 2022.
- Dancing with the Stars—It was announced on April 8, 2022, by creator ABC that from its thirty-first season onward, the series would be moving to Disney+.
- Duncanville—Canceled on June 26, 2022. by creator Fox, after three seasons. The last six episodes streamed exclusively on Hulu.
- The Endgame—Canceled on May 12, 2022, by creator NBC.
- Kenan—Canceled on May 12, 2022, by creator NBC, after two seasons.
- Mr. Mayor—Canceled on May 12, 2022, by creator NBC, after two seasons. The series concluded on May 17, 2022.
- Ordinary Joe—Canceled on March 4, 2022, by creator NBC.

==== CTV/CTV 2 ====
- B Positive—Canceled on May 12, 2022, by creator CBS, after two seasons.
- Our Kind of People—Canceled on May 13, 2022, by creator Fox.
- Pivoting—Canceled on May 13, 2022, by creator Fox.
- Queens—Canceled on May 6, 2022, by creator ABC.
- This Is Us—It was announced on May 12, 2021, by creator NBC that season six would be the final season. The series concluded on May 24, 2022.

==== Global ====
- Bull—It was announced on January 18, 2022, by creator CBS that season six would be the final season.
- Good Sam—Canceled on May 12, 2022, by creator CBS.
- How We Roll—Canceled on May 12, 2022, by creator CBS. The series concluded on May 19, 2022.
- SEAL Team—It was announced on May 18, 2021, that after airing the first four episodes of the fifth season on Global and creator CBS, the series would be moving to Paramount+ for the remainder of its run.
- The Thing About Pam—The miniseries is meant to run for one season only; it concluded on April 12, 2022.
- United States of Al—Canceled on May 12, 2022, by creator CBS, after two seasons. The series concluded on May 19, 2022.
- Women of the Movement—The miniseries is meant to run for one season only, it concluded on January 20, 2022.

== Weekly ratings ==
Most-watched shows by week (single-network only)
Week of	National anglophone			Quebec francophone			Refs.
Week of	Title	Network	Viewers (millions)	Title	Network	Viewers (millions)	Refs.
August 30	CTV News at Six	CTV	1.32	La Poule aux œufs d'or	TVA	0.64	
September 6	CTV News at Six	CTV	1.27	C'est la rentrée TVA	TVA	1.16	
September 13	CTV News at Six	CTV	1.35	District 31	R-C	1.73	
September 20	The Rookie	CTV	1.79	District 31	R-C	1.74	
September 27	The Good Doctor	CTV	1.88	District 31	R-C	1.81	
October 4	CSI: Vegas	Global	2.05	District 31	R-C	1.88	
October 11	9-1-1	Global	1.87	District 31	R-C	1.82	
October 18	Blue Bloods	CTV	1.70	Chanteurs masqués	TVA	1.88	
October 25	The Good Doctor	CTV	1.88	District 31	R-C	1.79	
November 1	The Good Doctor	CTV	1.78	District 31	R-C	1.76	
November 8	Adele One Night Only	Global	2.00	District 31	R-C	1.81	
November 15	9-1-1	Global	1.75	Chanteurs masqués	TVA	1.84	
November 22	CSI: Vegas	Global	1.64	Chanteurs masqués	TVA	1.98	
November 29	9-1-1	Global	1.72	District 31	R-C	1.80	
December 6	108th Grey Cup	TSN	2.89	District 31	R-C	1.79	
December 13	CTV News at Six	CTV	1.61	District 31	R-C	1.70	
December 20	2022 WJHC preliminary round game Czechia vs. Canada	TSN	1.94	TVA Nouvelles 18h	TVA	0.85	
December 27	The Rookie	CTV	1.61	Bye Bye 2021	R-C	4.86	
January 3	9-1-1: Lone Star	CTV	1.80	Le bonheur	TVA	1.91	
January 10	9-1-1: Lone Star	CTV	1.92	District 31	R-C	1.74	
January 17	Blue Bloods	CTV	1.75	District 31	R-C	1.78	
January 24	NFL conference championships (viewership average for two games)	CTV	2.03	District 31	R-C	1.77	
January 31	FBI	Global	1.62	District 31	R-C	1.82	
February 7	Super Bowl LVI	CTV	7.23	District 31	R-C	1.74	
February 14	9-1-1: Lone Star	CTV	1.71	District 31	R-C	1.78	
February 21	9-1-1: Lone Star	CTV	1.76	District 31	R-C	1.68	
February 28	9-1-1: Lone Star	CTV	2.01	District 31	R-C	1.65	
March 7	9-1-1: Lone Star	CTV	1.79	District 31	R-C	1.68	
March 14	The Good Doctor	CTV	1.76	District 31	R-C	1.64	
March 21	94th Academy Awards	CTV	3.27	District 31	R-C	1.70	
March 28	Survivor	Global	1.81	District 31	R-C	1.68	
April 4	Survivor	Global	1.69	District 31	R-C	1.67	
April 11	The Good Doctor	CTV	1.81	District 31	R-C	1.69	
April 18	Survivor	Global	1.74	District 31	R-C	1.82	
April 25	Survivor	Global	1.66	Tout le monde en parle	R-C	1.03	
May 2	Survivor	Global	1.54	Tout le monde en parle	R-C	0.98	
May 9	Survivor	Global	1.57	Vlog	TVA	0.80	
May 16	Survivor	Global	1.70	Le Tricheur	TVA	0.85	
May 23	Survivor	Global	1.47	Un zoo pas comme les autres	TVA	0.81	
May 30	CTV News at Six	CTV	1.20	Un zoo pas comme les autres	TVA	0.85	
June 6	CTV News at Six	CTV	1.26	Un zoo pas comme les autres	TVA	0.85	
June 13	CTV News at Six	CTV	1.19	Un zoo pas comme les autres	TVA	0.83	
June 20	2022 Stanley Cup Finals (viewership average for Games 3-6)	Sportsnet	1.27	Un zoo pas comme les autres	TVA	0.86	
June 27	CTV News at Six	CTV	1.18	Un zoo pas comme les autres	TVA	1.03	
July 4	The Amazing Race Canada	CTV	1.70	Un zoo pas comme les autres	TVA	0.88	
July 11	The Amazing Race Canada	CTV	1.59	Un zoo pas comme les autres	TVA	0.80	
July 18	The Amazing Race Canada	CTV	1.77	Un zoo pas comme les autres	TVA	0.87	
July 25	The Amazing Race Canada	CTV	1.41	9-1-1 (v.f.)	TVA	0.70	
August 1	CTV News at Six	CTV	1.24	La recrue	TVA	0.68	
August 8	The Amazing Race Canada	CTV	1.60	La recrue Roue de fortune chez vous (tie)	TVA	0.61	
August 15	The Amazing Race Canada	CTV	1.75	La recrue	TVA	0.68	
August 22	The Amazing Race Canada	CTV	1.54	9-1-1 (v.f.)	TVA	0.66	

Note: Certain programs rated by Numeris are aggregates of multiple productions (such as local newscasts on a network's owned-and-operated stations) that may include common national advertising, and/or averaged over multiple broadcasts during the week.

== See also ==
- 2021–22 United States network television schedule
