= 2021 in Canadian television =

The following is a list of events affecting Canadian television in 2021. Events listed include television show debuts, finales, cancellations, and channel launches, closures and rebrandings.

== Events ==
=== March ===
Date	Event	Source
11	Following its acquisition of the French-language V network, now branded as Noovo, in 2020, Bell Media announces the relaunch of dedicated news division Noovo Info. The network has had only a barebones news presence since former owner Remstar imposed major staffing cutbacks in 2008; under Bell Media's new plan, the network's news division will relaunch a twice-daily newscast titled Le Fil on March 29.	

=== June ===
Date	Event	Source
16	The journalism division of the CBC — News, Current Affairs, and Local — are to turn off commenting on their Facebook posts for four weeks. The move was in response to written attacks on staff, and moderation levels described as "not sustainable."	

== Programs ==
=== Programs debuting in 2021 ===
Start date	Show	Channel	Source
January 5	Humour Resources	CBC Television	
January 6	Sans rancune	TVA	
January 10	Big Brother Célébrités	Noovo	
January 13	Entre deux draps	Noovo	
January 15	Anyone's Game	CBC Television	
February 4	Project Bakeover	Food Network	
February 7	Holmes Family Effect	CTV	
February 11	Secret History	APTN	
February 13	Gespe'gewa'gi: The Last Land	APTN	
February 18	Rock Solid Builds	HGTV	
February 23	Pretty Hard Cases	CBC Television	
February 26	Arctic Vets	CBC Television	
March 4	For Heaven's Sake	CBC Gem	
March 6	This Is Pop	CTV	
March 22	Shine True	OutTV	
March 29	Le Fil	Noovo	
April 30	Cam Boy	OutTV	
May 7	Way Over Me (Sortez-moi de moi)	Crave, Super Écran	
May 8	Yukon Harvest	APTN	
May 17	Gabby's Farm	TVOntario	
June 1	Querencia	APTN Lumi	
July 16	SurrealEstate	CTV Sci-Fi Channel	
August 25	Motel Makeover	Netflix	
August 27	Undisrupted	CBC Gem	
September 6	Mary Makes It Easy	CTV Life Channel	
September 9	Race Against the Tide	CBC Television	
September 10	Unsettled	APTN	
September 13	Qui sait chanter?	Noovo	
September 14	Moonshine	CBC Television	
September 14	Strays	CBC Television	
September 15	Virage	Noovo	
September 17	Family Law	Global	
September 18	Thomas & Friends: All Engines Go	Treehouse TV	
September 19	Chanteurs masqués	TVA	
October 11	Roast Battle Canada	CTV Comedy Channel	
October 12	British Columbia: An Untold History	Knowledge	
October 20	Vollies	TV1	
October 25	Call Me Mother	OutTV	
October 29	Overlord and the Underwoods	CBC Gem	
November 9	Sort Of	CBC Television	
November 22	The Missus Downstairs	TV1	
December 9	1 Queen 5 Queers	Crave	
Unknown date	Happy House of Frightenstein	Family Jr.	
Unknown date	Pink Is In	TV1	

=== Programs ending in 2021 ===
End date	Show	Channel	First aired	Status	Source
February 8	Les Pays d'en haut	Ici Radio-Canada Télé	2016	Ended	
March 8	Frankie Drake Mysteries	CBC Television	2017	Canceled	
March 18	Burden of Truth	CBC Television	2018	Ended	
April 13	Kim's Convenience	CBC Television	2016	Ended	
November 1	Corner Gas Animated	CTV Comedy Channel	2018	Ended	

=== Television films and specials ===
Airdate	Show	Channel	Source
April	Faith Heist	Super Channel	
April 30	Catching a Serial Killer: Bruce McArthur	Super Channel	
May 25	The Face of Anonymous	TVOntario	
June 6	Juno Awards of 2021	CBC Television	
July 5	Fresh Water	Crave	
August 1	FreeUp! The Emancipation Day Special	CBC Gem	
September 18	2021 TIFF Tribute Awards	CTV	
September 30	We Know the Truth: Stories to Inspire Reconciliation	CBC Television	
November 7	43rd Félix Awards	Ici Radio-Canada Télé	

== Networks and services ==
=== Network launches ===
Network	Type	Launch date	Notes
Uvagut TV	Cable and satellite	January 18	An Inuktut language channel. Translates as "Our TV."

=== Network conversions and rebrandings ===
Old network name	New network name	Type	Conversion date	Notes
HIFI	BBC First		March 16	

=== Network closures ===
Network	Type	Closure date	Notes
BookTelevision		February 21	
Fashion Television		February 21	

=== Station closures ===
Market	Station	Affiliation	Closure date	Notes
Rivière-du-Loup, Quebec	CKRT-DT	Ici Radio-Canada Télé	August 31	

== Deaths ==
- May 26 – Paul Soles, actor and television personality (The Marvel Super Heroes, Spider-Man) (born 1930)
- July 24 – Alfie Scopp, English-born actor (Tales of the Wizard of Oz, Fiddler on the Roof, Rudolph the Red-Nosed Reindeer) (born 1919).
- September 14 - Norm Macdonald, comedian and actor better known for his work in American television (born 1959)
