= Jessica Mulroney =

Canadian fashion stylist (born 1980)

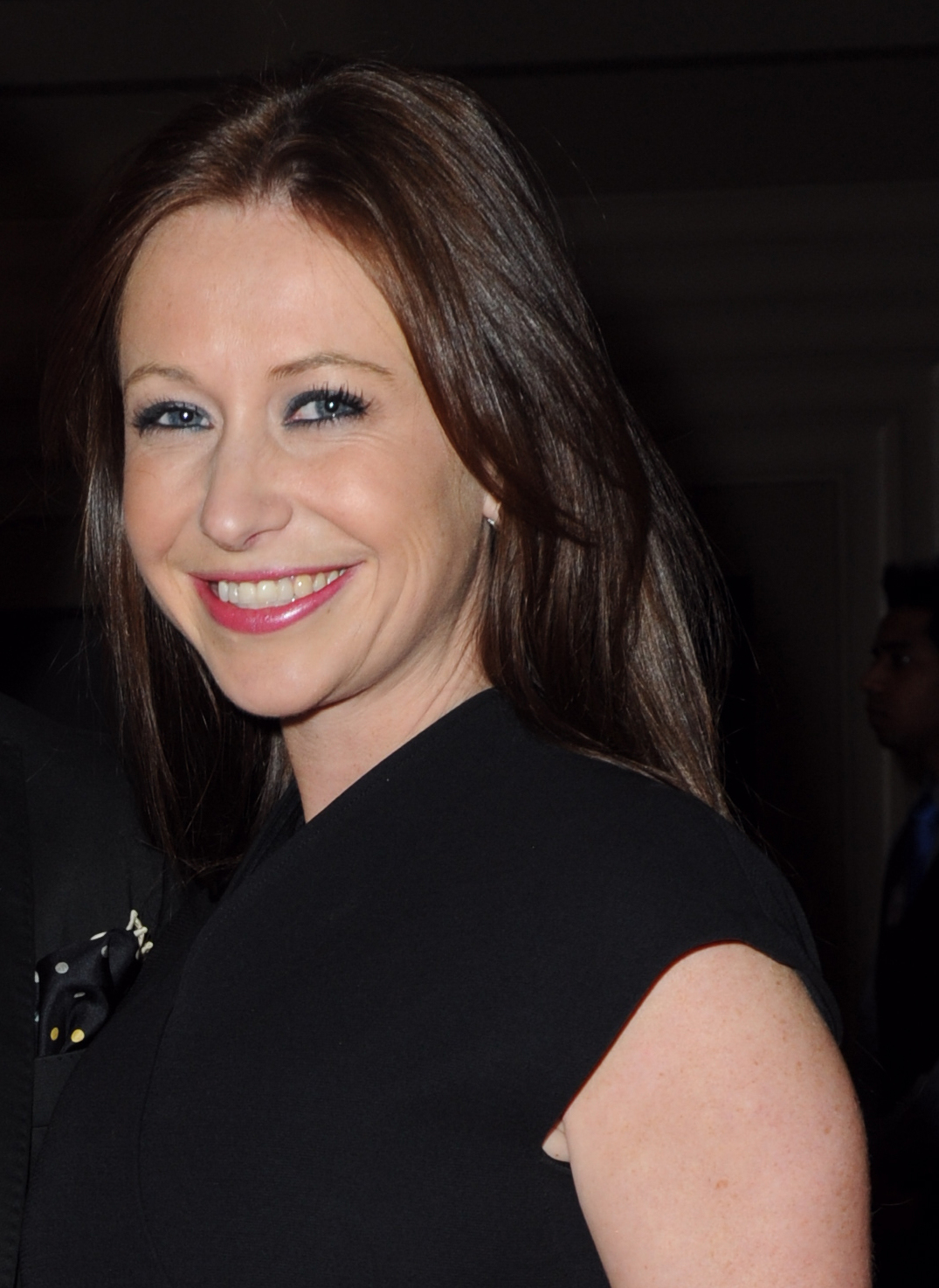
- Mulroney at a Canadian Film Centre gala in 2012
- Born: Jessica Brownstein; March 14, 1980 (age 46)
- Education: McGill University
- Occupations: Fashion stylist; marketing consultant
- Spouse: Ben Mulroney (m. 2008; sep. 2025)
- Children: 3
- Relatives: John Brownstein (brother); Brian Mulroney (father-in-law); Mila Mulroney (mother-in-law); Caroline Mulroney (sister-in-law)

Jessica Mulroney (née Brownstein; born March 14, 1980) is a Canadian fashion stylist and marketing consultant, noted for her previous work with Kleinfeld Bridal (Hudson's Bay), past guest appearances on television shows Good Morning America and CityLine, and hosting of I Do, Redo. She is a Canadian fashion advocate and as a contributor to Sunwing's Wedding Vacations magazine.

== Early life ==
Mulroney was born Jessica Brownstein to a Jewish family, the daughter of Veronica (née Coleman) and Stephen Brownstein. Her brother is Harvard professor John Brownstein. She is a great-granddaughter of Benjamin Brownstein, the founder of Browns Shoes.

She grew up in Westmount and attended Miss Edgar's and Miss Cramp's School on a scholarship. She graduated from McGill University with a degree in industrial relations.

== Career ==
Early in her career, Mulroney and sibling Elizabeth distributed the lingerie lines la Perla and Cosabell.

In November 2015, Mulroney styled ensembles for Sophie Grégoire Trudeau, then the wife of Canadian prime minister Justin Trudeau (in an unofficial capacity); Mulroney and her husband Ben Mulroney were considered close to the former couple. In 2015, Mulroney assisted Meghan Markle in choosing a wedding dress for Markle's Suits character, Rachel Zane. In 2019, she styled Mindy Kaling for a number of appearances, including the Oscars red carpet. She was also a stylist for Shania Twain.

In 2014, Mulroney became a bridal consultant for the Hudson's Bay Company (Kleinfeld branch), which later expanded to include consulting, PR, social media, events, and serving as the acting spokesperson for their CORE Life brand, which launched in fall 2018. She made appearances on Breakfast Television Toronto and was a regular guest stylist for CityLine. In 2019, ABC signed Mulroney as a style contributor. Mulroney hosted the 2020 reality series I Do, Redo for CTV, in which couples renewed their wedding vows. She is also a regular contributor to Wedding Vacations by Sunwing, an annual magazine published by the travel company.

Mulroney is a prominent advocate for the Canadian fashion industry.

=== Bullying allegation ===
On June 10, 2020, Mulroney became the centre of controversy after Sasha Exeter, a Black brand marketer/lifestyle influencer from Toronto, posted a video on Instagram stating that Mulroney had bullied her after Exeter publicly called for social media influencers to use their platforms in support of black people; according to Exeter, Mulroney had taken this call as a personal attack. Mulroney later made a public apology. After Exeter's video gained significant attention, Mulroney lost her contracts with Hudson's Bay, ABC, Cityline and CTV (her CTV series I Do, Redo was cancelled). Following the incident, Mulroney's husband resigned from etalk on June 22. National Post opinion columnist Barbara Kay was given private access to previously undisclosed texts and messages between Mulroney and Exeter. Kay argued in her January 21, 2021, column that Mulroney was threatened and bullied by Exeter and that Mulroney's own threats to Exeter had thus been provoked.

== Charity ==
Mulroney and her sisters-in-law Caroline, Katy, and Vanessa Mulroney co-founded the charity The Shoebox Project for Shelters, aiming to assist homeless and at-risk women. In 2020, following the controversy involving Sasha Exeter, Mulroney stepped down from her role in the project.

== Personal life ==
On October 30, 2008, Brownstein married Ben Mulroney, the eldest son and second eldest child of former Canadian Prime Minister Brian Mulroney and Mila Mulroney. The couple have three children: two sons, who are fraternal twins, and a daughter. In July 2025, it was reported that the couple had separated.

Mulroney was considered to be a close friend of the Duchess of Sussex (née Meghan Markle), whom she met in 2011 while she was working in Toronto. In 2018, she and her husband attended her wedding to Prince Harry, and their children participated as page boys and flower girl. During her 2020 feud with Sasha Exeter, Mulroney described Markle as her "closest friend" with whom she had experiences "where race was front and centre", a statement which was reportedly perceived by the Duchess to exploit their friendship. Mulroney later denied the rumors of a rift with Markle.
