= The Shoebox Project for Shelters =

Canadian charity

The Shoebox Project for Shelters (French: Opération boîte à chaussures pour refuges) is a Canadian registered charity based in Toronto, Ontario. It is nationally supported by Dream. It collects and distributes shoeboxes filled by volunteer donors with essential and small luxury items for women who are homeless or at-risk of homelessness in communities across Canada and the United States. Its mission is to remind "women experiencing homelessness...that they are special, beautiful, and worthy of a happy holiday." It serves to let women living in or accessing shelters and outreach centers know their community cares about them and values them. The current executive director is Lesley Hendry, former social worker, in Toronto, Ontario and Ottawa, Ontario.

The Shoebox Project operates more than 35 chapters across the U.S. and Canada including in San Francisco, New York City, Vancouver, Montreal, and Ottawa. Local drives are usually active around various holidays including International Women's Day, Mother's Day, and Christmas.

In 2011, The Shoebox Project distributed over 400 Shoeboxes to four Toronto women's shelters. This increased to delivering almost 25,000 Shoeboxes to 135 communities across Canada and the U.S. in 2015.

== History ==
The Shoebox Project for Shelters was founded in 2011 by Caroline Mulroney Lapham, Jessica Mulroney, Katy Mulroney, and Vanessa Mulroney. The idea for the charity stemmed from the efforts of Jessica's mother to collect donations for shelters in Montreal. The sisters-in-law decided to do a similar initiative to benefit the Red Door Family Shelter in Toronto. Their original goal was 156 Shoeboxes, but they surpassed this and collected 400 Shoeboxes which were distributed to 4 local shelters in time for the holidays.
