= Flirty Dancing =

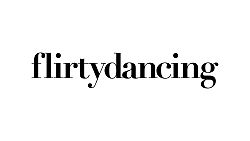
- Genre: Reality television Dance
- Presented by: Jenna Dewan
- Country of origin: United States
- Original language: English
- No. of seasons: 1
- No. of episodes: 6

Production
- Executive producers: Deborah Sargeant; Jilly Pearce
- Production companies: Second Star; All3Media

Original release
- Network: Fox
- Release: December 29, 2019 – January 25, 2020

Flirty Dancing is an American dance reality television series created for the Fox Broadcasting Company. Based on the Channel 4 version in the United Kingdom, it is produced by Second Star, which produces the original, and All3Media, and debuted on December 29, 2019.

On May 18, 2020, the series was cancelled after one season.

== Premise ==
Jenna Dewan hosts the show which features single people going on blind dates and dancing to choreographed routines.

== Episodes ==
No.	Title	Original release date	U.S. viewers (millions)
1	"Octavius & Erin"	December 29, 2019	3.46
2	"Cy & Beau"	January 1, 2020	1.79
3	"Anna & Ted"	January 8, 2020	1.38
4	"Danielle & Jordan"	January 15, 2020	1.48
5	"Alex & Navi"	January 25, 2020	0.89
6	"Khairi & Ashlee"	January 25, 2020	0.93
