= I Do, Redo =

2020 Canadian reality television series

- Genre: Reality
- Presented by: Jessica Mulroney
- Country of origin: Canada
- Original language: English
- No. of seasons: 1
- No. of episodes: 5

Production
- Production companies: Insight Productions; Bell Media

Original release
- Network: CTV
- Release: March 22 – April 19, 2020

I Do, Redo is a Canadian reality television series that premiered on March 22, 2020, on CTV. Hosted by celebrity influencer Jessica Mulroney, the series profiles couples whose weddings went badly due to circumstances outside of their control and features Mulroney and designer Caspar Haydar designing an opportunity for them to redo the ceremonies.

On June 10, the show was abruptly cancelled following allegations that Mulroney threatened Sasha Exeter, a black female writer and influencer over social media. The episode that aired on April 19, 2020, was made the final episode.
