= Almost Family =

2019 American drama television series

- Genre: Drama
- Based on: Sisters by Jonathan Gavin & Imogen Banks
- Developed by: Annie Weisman
- Starring: Brittany Snow; Megalyn Echikunwoke; Emily Osment; Mo McRae; Mustafa Elzein; Victoria Cartagena; Timothy Hutton
- Music by: David Schwartz
- Country of origin: United States
- Original language: English
- No. of seasons: 1
- No. of episodes: 13

Production
- Executive producers: Leslye Headland; Imogen Banks; Sharon Levy; Jeni Mulein; Annie Weisman; Jason Katims
- Producers: Patrick Ward; Lori Keith Douglas
- Cinematography: Tim Bellen; Arthur Africano
- Editors: Peter Forslund; Nancy Morrison; Garret Price; Mike Weintraub
- Camera setup: Single-camera
- Running time: 43–46 minutes
- Production companies: Parasox; True Jack Productions; Endemol Shine North America; XOF Productions; Universal Television

Original release
- Network: Fox
- Release: October 2, 2019 – February 22, 2020

Almost Family is an American drama television series based on the Australian television series Sisters, developed by Annie Weisman which aired from October 2, 2019, to February 22, 2020, on Fox.

In March 2020, Fox canceled the series after one season.

== Premise ==
When it is revealed that fertility doctor Leon Bechley (Timothy Hutton) had used his own sperm to conceive at least 100 children throughout his career, Julia Bechley (Brittany Snow) unites with two of her half siblings—including childhood friend Edie Palmer (Megalyn Echikunwoke), and retired Olympic athlete Roxy Doyle (Emily Osment)—as they deal with issues that have been affecting their lives.

== Cast ==
- Brittany Snow as Julia Bechley, a communications director for her father's fertility clinic
- Megalyn Echikunwoke as Edie Palmer, Julia's childhood friend and one of Julia's half siblings who is a criminal defense attorney
- Emily Osment as Roxy Doyle, a retired gymnast and one of Julia's half siblings
- Mo McRae as Tim Moore, Edie's husband who is also a criminal defense attorney at the same law firm and Julia's ex-boyfriend
- Mustafa Elzein as Dr. Isaac Abadi, an employee of the Bechley clinic and Leon's trusted second-in-command
- Victoria Cartagena as Amanda Doherty, the woman that Edie is cheating on her husband with and the assistant district attorney assigned to prosecute Leon
- Timothy Hutton as Leon Bechley, a fertility doctor and Julia's father, accused of fathering dozens of children without his patients' knowledge or consent

== Production ==
=== Development ===
On October 16, 2018, it was announced that Fox had given the production, then titled Sisters, a pilot production commitment. The pilot was written by Annie Weisman who was also set to executive produce alongside Jason Katims, Jeni Mulein, Imogen Banks, Sharon Levy, Leslye Headland (also the director). Production companies involved with the pilot include Universal Television and Fox Entertainment. On February 13, 2019, the production officially received a pilot order.

On May 9, 2019, it was announced that Fox had given the series order. A few days later, it was announced that the title of the show had been changed to Not Just Me. A day after that, it was announced that the series would premiere in the fall of 2019 and air on Wednesdays at 9:00 P.M. In June 2019, Fox changed the title from Not Just Me to Almost Family. The series debuted on October 2, 2019. On March 2, 2020, the series was canceled after one season.

=== Casting ===
In February 2019, it was announced that Brittany Snow and Megalyn Echikunwoke had been cast in the pilot's lead roles. In March 2019, it was reported that Emily Osment and Victoria Cartagena had joined the cast.

== Episodes ==
No.	Title	Directed by	Teleplay by	Original release date	U.S. viewers (millions)
1	"Pilot"	Leslye Headland	Annie Weisman	October 2, 2019	2.73
2	"Related AF"	Randy Zisk	Annie Weisman	October 9, 2019	2.33
3	"Notorious AF"	Jonathan Brown	Ian Deitchman & Kristin Robinson	October 16, 2019	2.17
4	"Fake AF"	Michael Weaver	Ellen Fairey	November 13, 2019	1.58
5	"Risky AF"	Kellie Cyrus	Joshua Allen	November 20, 2019	1.73
6	"Kosher AF"	Tricia Brock	Michelle Lirtzman	November 27, 2019	1.32
7	"Thankful AF"	Catalina Aguilar Mastretta	Abdi Nazemian	November 28, 2019	1.12
8	"Fertile AF"	Peter Sollett	Annie Weisman	December 11, 2019	2.08
9	"Rehabilitated AF"	Arlene Sanford	Ian Deitchman & Kristin Robinson	January 1, 2020	1.06
10	"Courageous AF"	Tim Bellen	Zina Camblin	January 8, 2020	1.03
11	"Generational AF"	Linda Mendoza	Ellen Fairey	January 15, 2020	1.01
12	"Permanent AF"	Kimberly McCullough	Joshua Allen	February 22, 2020	0.92
13	"Expectant AF"	Randy Zisk	Annie Weisman & Michelle Lirtzman	February 22, 2020	0.82

== Release ==
On May 13, 2019, Fox released the first official trailer for the series.

== Reception ==
=== Critical response ===
On review aggregator Rotten Tomatoes, Almost Family holds an approval rating of 28% based on 18 reviews, with an average rating of 4.40/10. The website's critical consensus states, "An appealing cast can't make up for Almost Family's appalling premise." On Metacritic, it has a weighted average score of 38 out of 100, based on 11 critics, indicating "generally unfavorable reviews".

=== Ratings ===
Viewership and ratings per episode of Almost Family
No.	Title	Air date	Rating/share (18–49)	Viewers (millions)	DVR (18–49)	DVR viewers (millions)	Total (18–49)	Total viewers (millions)
1	"Pilot"	October 2, 2019	0.7/4	2.73	0.3	1.21	1.1	3.94
2	"Related AF"	October 9, 2019	0.7/3	2.33	0.3	1.00	1.0	3.34
3	"Notorious AF"	October 16, 2019	0.6/3	2.17	0.3	0.93	0.9	3.10
4	"Fake AF"	November 13, 2019	0.5/3	1.58	0.2	0.77	0.7	2.35
5	"Risky AF"	November 20, 2019	0.5/3	1.73	0.2	0.68	0.7	2.41
6	"Kosher AF"	November 27, 2019	0.3/2	1.32	0.2	0.58	0.5	1.90
7	"Thankful AF"	November 28, 2019	0.3/2	1.12	0.2	0.60	0.5	1.72
8	"Fertile AF"	December 11, 2019	0.6/3	2.08	0.2	0.58	0.8	2.66
9	"Rehabilitated AF"	January 1, 2020	0.3/2	1.06	—N/a	—N/a	—N/a	—N/a
10	"Courageous AF"	January 8, 2020	0.3/2	1.03	—N/a	—N/a	—N/a	—N/a
11	"Generational AF"	January 15, 2020	0.3/2	1.01	—N/a	—N/a	—N/a	—N/a
12	"Permanent AF"	February 22, 2020	0.3/2	0.92	—N/a	—N/a	—N/a	—N/a
13	"Expectant AF"	February 22, 2020	0.2/1	0.82	—N/a	—N/a	—N/a	—N/a
