= The Oland Murder =

Canadian television documentary series

The Oland Murder is a Canadian television documentary series that aired on CBC Television in 2020. The series profiles the 2011 death of Richard Oland, centering in particular on the appeal and retrial of his son Dennis Oland after legal errors were found in his original conviction.

The series was created by Deborah Wainwright for eOne.

The series also aired internationally under the title The Suspect.

The series received two Canadian Screen Award nominations at the 9th Canadian Screen Awards in 2021, for Best Direction in a Factual Program or Series (Deborah Wainwright for "Dog in the Fight") and Best Writing in a Factual Program or Series (Wainwright, Greg Laikan, Kristian Olsen and Stephanie Rosloski for "Dog in the Fight").
