= Fridge Wars =

Canadian cooking reality show

- Promotional poster for the series, containing the US airdate.
- Genre: Cookery
- Presented by: Emma Hunter
- Country of origin: Canada
- Original language: English
- No. of seasons: 1
- No. of episodes: 6

Production
- Production companies: The Gurin Company; Canadian Broadcasting Corporation

Original release
- Network: CBC Television
- Release: February 27 – April 2, 2020

Fridge Wars is a Canadian reality television series, which premiered February 27, 2020 on CBC Television. Hosted by Emma Hunter, the series features professional chefs competing to create restaurant-quality meals using only the contents found in a real Canadian family's refrigerator, which are then judged by the families whose fridges were raided to determine the winner.

The series is produced by The Gurin Company and the CBC.

== Format ==
Each episode of Fridge Wars features two chefs cooking two meals (separated by two rounds) for two different families, with the sole ingredients they find in each family's fridge. They are given 45 minutes to prepare each meal and are given clues to help them make a meal that the family they are cooking for might enjoy. After each round, the families are allowed to taste the meal, without knowing which of the two chefs cooked it. They are then given devices to rate the food on 3 categories: Look, Taste, and Originality. These scores are later averaged, and the chef with the highest score wins the episode and is awarded a trophy.

=== What the Fridge Challenge ===
During round two, the chefs are given a challenge that increases the difficulty in the meals they are preparing.

- In the premiere episode, the chefs were told that their original meal for six was to be increased into a meal for ten.
- In episode 2, the chefs were forced to blindly pick a "sauce" (from 3 options) to use in their meals.
- In episode 3, the chefs were forced to add bitter melon and Vietnamese basil to their meals.
- In episode 6, the chefs had to switch the dishes that they were cooking with each other.

== Episodes ==
The winners of each episode are listed in bold.

No.	Title	Original release date
1	"Matt Basile vs. Massimo Capra"	February 27, 2020
Matt Basile: Total Score: **8.9**; Round 1: Reverse seared sirloin steak, sweet peas, and a side of fried gnudi.; Round 2: Trinity sauce bean ragù with prosciutto, toasted sourdough, and crispy cheese frico, and a side of fish fry.; Massimo Capra: Total Score: 8.6; Round 1: Roasted pork chops in a mustard orange sauce, sweet potato flan, and a side of meatballs.; Round 2: Fideuà with chorizo, raw broccoli Greek salad, and cornmeal-crusted basa fish.
2	"Shahir Massoud vs. Wallace Wong"	March 5, 2020
Shahir Massoud: Total Score: 8.0; Round 1: Indian chicken Milanese in a carbonara sauce, and a romesco purée with roasted peppers.; Round 2: Homemade tagliatelle pasta with pork, cabbage, and lentil ragu topped with a crispy pangrattato.; Wallace Wong: Total Score: **9.2**; Round 1: Shrimp and sausage croquette stuffed with cheese and a ramen crust, a butternut squash sauce, and stir-fried roti strips.; Round 2: Pan-fried dumplings with Bolognese sauce consisting of lentils and leeks, and fried chow mein noodles on top.
3	"Nicole Gomes vs. Dustin Gallagher"	March 12, 2020
Nicole Gomes: Total Score: **8.6**; Round 1: Frilly pork cutlet in a yellow curry sauce.; Round 2: Scallop crab cake with lobster salad.; Dustin Gallagher: Total Score: 8.1; Round 1: Tortilla polenta with sausage.; Round 2: Lobster Thermidor.
4	"La-Toya Fagon vs. Julie Miguel"	March 19, 2020
5	"Nadia G vs. Rodney Bowers"	March 26, 2020
6	"Shane Chartrand vs. Joshna Maharaj"	April 2, 2020

== International broadcast ==
The series premiered in the US on August 2, 2020, as part of The CW's Summer 2020 programming lineup.

In April 2022 the German spin-off Kühlschrank öffne dich! (en: Fridge open!) was aired on Sat.1 and is based on the Canadian original Fridge Wars.

== Reception ==
=== Critical reception ===
Joel Keller, writing for Decider, lauded the series, stating that "[I] didn’t think that Fridge Wars was going to be as fun as it was; [I] thought that it would be a standard-grade cooking competition and that’s that. But executive producers Phil Gurin and Tracie Tighe have hit on a formula that takes the Chopped-style format and brings it down to earth." Meanwhile, Rob Owen, writing for the Pittsburgh Post-Gazette, criticized the series, saying that it felt too long. Rob writes: "As with plenty of reality competitions, one wonders if Fridge Wars might be stronger with one family at a half-hour rather than the one-hour running time, but for the most part Fridge Wars doesn’t feel padded."
