= Anyone's Game =

Canadian documentary television series

Anyone's Game is a Canadian documentary television series, which premiered on CBC Television in January 2021.

The series profiles Athlete Institute, a basketball training program in Dufferin County, Ontario which has developed a reputation as one of the world's foremost producers of Division I and NBA basketball players.

The series was originally announced with the title Orangeville Prep.

The series received a Canadian Screen Award nomination for Best Sports Program or Series at the 10th Canadian Screen Awards in 2022.
