= Holmes Family Effect =

Canadian home improvement television show

- Genre: Reality; Home improvement
- Directed by: Robin Johnston
- Presented by: Mike Holmes; Mike Holmes, Jr. Sherry Holmes
- Country of origin: Canada
- Original language: English
- No. of seasons: 1
- No. of episodes: 4

Production
- Executive producer: Mike Holmes
- Producers: Grant Greschuk; Paul McConvey
- Production company: Make It Right Productions

Original release
- Network: CTV (Canada); Fox (United States)
- Release: 7 February – 7 March 2021

Holmes Family Effect is a Canadian reality television series, which premiered on 7 February 2021 on CTV. Hosted by Mike Holmes with his children Mike Holmes Jr. and Sherry Holmes, the series features the trio working with service organizations seeking to redesign and improve their working spaces.

Mike Holmes' first show for CTV after years of being associated primarily with HGTV Canada, the series premiered on 7 February 2021 following Super Bowl LV. The series has also been acquired by Fox for broadcast in the United States later in 2021. The series aired on 16 March 2021 and 23 March 2021 for 2 hours on Fox.

== Crew ==
Assisting the Holmes family in this endeavour are his team. Mike Holmes employs his regular crew for the episodes in and around the Greater Toronto Area, and a separate crew for the episodes taking place in Metro Vancouver.

- Blake Steed is the crew chief, and is the husband of Sherry Holmes. He has been with the Holmes Crew since the second episode of Holmes Makes it Right in 2012. He is the only member of the Holmes Crew, outside of the Holmes family, to travel to Metro Vancouver for the episodes that take place there.
- Derek Ullman is the best friend of Michael, and has been with the Holmes Crew since the first episode of Holmes Makes it Right. This series is the last series where he appears on the Holmes Crew.
- Bailey Harris is a member of the Holmes Crew, first introduced as an apprentice in 2019's Holmes 911. She comes from a family of handypeople, and got her experience from working with them to renovate her own home.
- Troy McKenna is a member of the Holmes Crew, first appearing on Holmes 911.
- Tyler Morrison is also a member of the Holmes Crew that was introduced on Holmes 911.
- Daniel Vella is the owner of a finish carpentry business that has appeared both as a subcontractor and a member of the Holmes Crew since Holmes Makes it Right in 2012. He was first credited as a member of the Holmes Crew in 2018's Holmes: Next Generation.

== Episodes ==
| No. | Title | Original release date | Canada viewers (millions) |
|---|---|---|---|
| 1 | "A Trade of a Lifetime" | 7 February 2021 | N/A |
The Holmes family helps a building trades teacher at Judith Nyman Secondary School in Brampton, Ontario redesign and update his classroom space.
| 2 | "Think Big. Dream Bigger." | 14 February 2021 | N/A |
Solid State, a talent incubator and coworking space for immigrant and racialized youth in Surrey, British Columbia, has its offices renovated into a more flexible space better suited to the collaborative and technological needs of a group of young and creative entrepreneurs.
| 3 | "One Step at a Time" | 21 February 2021 | N/A |
Working Gear, an organization in Vancouver, British Columbia, which supplies free work clothing to low-income men and women reentering the workforce, gets help improving its crowded and cluttered offices.
| 4 | "Hold the Fort" | 7 March 2021 | N/A |
The Fort, a youth centre in Smithville, Ontario, gets a radical transformation of its run-down facilities.
