= Arctic Vets =

Canadian documentary television series

Arctic Vets is a Canadian documentary television series, which premiered on CBC Television in February 2021. The series profiles the veterinary team at the Assiniboine Park Conservancy in Winnipeg, Manitoba, who specialize in the care of Arctic animals such as seals, polar bears and muskox.

The series received a Canadian Screen Award nomination for Best Factual Series at the 11th Canadian Screen Awards in 2023.

== Episodes ==
=== Season 1 ===
No. overall	No. in season	Title	Directed by	Written by	Original release date
1	1	"Polar Bear Heli-Rescue"	Unknown	Unknown	February 26, 2021
2	2	"Mama Bear, Her Three Cubs and a Movie Star Wolf"	Unknown	Unknown	March 5, 2021
3	3	"Beluga Scars, a Cracked Beak and Broken Polar Bear Teeth"	Unknown	Unknown	March 12, 2021
4	4	"Polar Bear Doc on Call"	Unknown	Unknown	March 19, 2021
5	5	"Great Horned Owl Rescue"	Unknown	Unknown	March 26, 2021
6	6	"Movie Wolves in Distress"	Unknown	Unknown	April 2, 2021
7	7	"Blizzard"	Unknown	Unknown	April 9, 2021
8	8	"Trouble for Onyx the Wolf"	Unknown	Unknown	April 16, 2021
9	9	"Bumblefoot"	Unknown	Unknown	April 23, 2021
10	10	"Arctic Goodbyes"	Unknown	Unknown	April 30, 2021

=== Season 2 ===
No. overall	No. in season	Title	Directed by	Written by	Original release date
11	1	"Polar Bear Rush Hour"	Unknown	Unknown	January 7, 2022
12	2	"Grey Wolf Cancer Scare"	Unknown	Unknown	January 14, 2022
13	3	"Snow Leopard Surgery"	Unknown	Unknown	January 21, 2022
14	4	"Alaskan Seal Rescue"	Unknown	Unknown	January 28, 2022
15	5	"Polar Bear Helicopter Hazing"	Unknown	Unknown	February 25, 2022
16	6	"Polar Bear Emergency Surgery"	Unknown	Unknown	March 4, 2022
17	7	"Lynx Kidney Failure"	Unknown	Unknown	March 11, 2022
18	8	"Polar Bear Brace"	Unknown	Unknown	March 18, 2022
19	9	"Polar Bear Ice Release"	Unknown	Unknown	March 25, 2022
20	10	"Mom and Cubs Polar Bear Rescue"	Unknown	Unknown	April 1, 2022
