= Family Feud Canada =

Canadian television game show

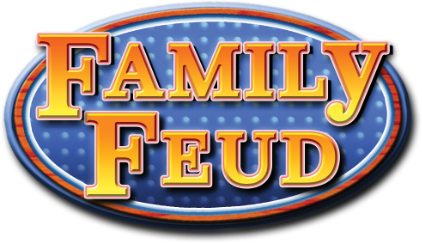
- Genre: Game show
- Created by: Mark Goodson
- Presented by: Gerry Dee
- Announcer: Rory O'Shea
- Theme music composer: Walt Levinsky
- Country of origin: Canada
- Original language: English
- No. of seasons: 6
- No. of episodes: 582

Production
- Production locations: Canadian Broadcasting Centre; Toronto, Ontario
- Running time: 22 minutes
- Production companies: Zone3; Fremantle North America

Original release
- Network: CBC
- Release: December 16, 2019 – present

Related
- Family Feud; La Guerre des clans

Family Feud Canada is an English-language Canadian game show based on the American game show. It is hosted by actor and comedian Gerry Dee. On May 29, 2019, it was announced that an English-speaking version would air on CBC Television, produced by Zone3, and distributed by Fremantle North America, starting on December 16, 2019.

While this was the first English-spoken version of its kind, its formerly long-running French-spoken version La Guerre des Clans {The War of the Clans} hosted by Luc Senay, Jean-François Baril and Jean-François Breau aired in Quebec.

Game play is the same as the concurrent U.S. version. The Fast Money prize in this version is CA$10,000 in tax-free money, and if the champions fail to win the grand prize, they receive $5 a point. As of December 30, 2019, there is a limit of three appearances (unlike the U.S. version, in which a family can appear up to five times, and also win a cash bonus and vacation after their fifth and final win). The music score is the same as in the U.S. original, and the set is nearly identical to the current one used in U.S. version of Family Feud, but with some differences. Each winning family from the first month would return following the three-day limit change.

All family members must be at least 18 years old, compared to the U.S. version, in which they don't have a fixed age requirement. (The U.S. version still recommends that the contestants be at least 15 years old, due to the nature of the questions).

In February 2020, the show was renewed for a second season by CBC. The second season began airing on October 12, 2020. It was also renewed for a third, fourth, fifth and upcoming sixth season.

The show covers costs for the contestants to travel to Toronto for game sessions. Among the game's rules are that contestants cannot boo other contestants.

== International broadcast ==
On July 6, 2026, episodes of this series began airing on American digital channel Buzzr as part of a promotional mini-marathon dubbed "Games Go Global", which also featured episodes of fellow British game shows Small Talk, hosted by Ronnie Corbett, and Going for Gold, hosted by Henry Kelly.
