= The Unicorn (TV series) =

2019 American sitcom television series

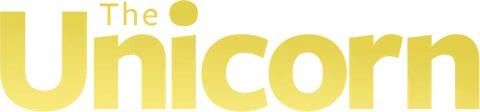
- Genre: Sitcom
- Created by: Bill Martin; Mike Schiff; Grady Cooper
- Starring: Walton Goggins; Rob Corddry; Omar Miller; Maya Lynne Robinson; Ruby Jay; Makenzie Moss; Devin Bright; Michaela Watkins
- Composers: Gabriel Mann; Rebecca Kneubuhl
- Country of origin: United States
- Original language: English
- No. of seasons: 2
- No. of episodes: 31

Production
- Executive producers: Bill Martin; Mike Schiff; Aaron Kaplan; Dana Honor; Wendi Trilling; Peyton Reed; John Hamburg
- Producers: Grady Cooper; Walton Goggins; Scott Sites
- Cinematography: Craig Kief
- Editor: Scott Ashby
- Camera setup: Single-camera
- Running time: 21–22 minutes
- Production companies: Trill TV; Kapital Entertainment; Mike and Bill Productions; CBS Studios

Original release
- Network: CBS
- Release: September 26, 2019 – March 18, 2021

The Unicorn is an American sitcom created by Bill Martin, Mike Schiff and Grady Cooper for CBS which premiered on September 26, 2019 and concluded on March 18, 2021. It stars Walton Goggins along with Rob Corddry, Omar Miller, Maya Lynne Robinson, Ruby Jay, MaKenzie Moss, Devin Bright, and Michaela Watkins in supporting roles. In May 2020, the series was renewed for a second season which premiered on November 12, 2020. In May 2021, the series was canceled after two seasons.

== Premise ==
A recently widowed father with two daughters is encouraged by his friends to re-enter the dating scene. To his surprise he becomes highly sought after due to his status as both an eligible widower and as a devoted father. The show is set in Raleigh, North Carolina.

== Cast and characters ==
=== Main ===
- Walton Goggins as Wade, the owner of a landscaping company and a single father trying to find a new balance in his life after his wife's death.
- Rob Corddry as Forrest, Wade's friend and Delia's husband who works as a human resources specialist.
- Omar Miller as Ben, a friend of Wade's who coaches the local soccer team and runs an audio technology company. Married to Michelle.
- Maya Lynne Robinson as Michelle, a friend of Wade's who is a stay-at-home mother of four and Ben's wife.
- Ruby Jay as Grace, Wade's older daughter.
- Makenzie Moss as Natalie, Wade's younger daughter.
- Devin Bright as Noah, Ben and Michelle's son.
- Michaela Watkins as Delia, Wade's pediatrician friend who is married to Forrest.

=== Recurring ===
- Betsy Brandt as Caroline, Wade's friend who manages a support group for widows.
- Sarayu Blue as Anna, a colleague of Delia's who briefly dates Wade.
- Cleo Fraser as Addie, Forrest and Delia's daughter.
- Princess K. Mapp as Sahai, Ben and Michele's daughter.
- Helen Hong as Emma, a member of Wade's support group.
- Cindy Drummond as Cynthia
- Natalie Zea as Shannon (season 2; guest season 1), Wade's love interest.

=== Guest ===
- Christina Moore as Lizzie ("Breaking Up is Hard to Do")
- Brittany Ishibashi as Lena ("Three Men Out" and "Put Your Mask on First")
- Missi Pyle as Ava ("Wade Delayed")
- Nicole Byer as Meg, Michelle's sister ("Breaking Up Is Hard to Do", "The Client" and "Out With the Old")
- Donal Logue as Denny ("The Client")
- Rob Riggle as Trey ("Work It" and "Put Your Mask on First")

== Episodes ==
=== Series overview ===
Season	Episodes	Originally released	
Season	Episodes	First released	Last released
1	18	September 26, 2019	March 12, 2020
2	13	November 12, 2020	March 18, 2021

=== Season 1 (2019–20) ===
No. overall	No. in season	Title	Directed by	Written by	Original air date	U.S. viewers (millions)
1	1	"Pilot"	John Hamburg	Story by : Bill Martin & Mike Schiff and Grady Cooper; Teleplay by : Bill Martin & Mike Schiff	September 26, 2019	6.04
A year after the death of his wife Jill, Wade and his two daughters Grace and Natalie are still living off the food from Jill's funeral, with Wade throwing himself into work and refusing to discipline his children or set a good example for them. After the food runs out, Wade's friends intervene and tell him that he needs to start dating and get his life back in order, a decision that Grace supports but Natalie does not. Wade sets up a dating profile and goes out on a date with a divorced woman named Danielle, but it goes poorly when he admits that his wife died and Danielle offers to sleep with him out of pity. Wade decides that he will not commit to a relationship until he figures out what he wants. He later learns that Grace and her boyfriend tried to have sex while he was out, which makes him realize that he needs to put his foot down and set boundaries for his kids. At a party for the soccer team he helps manage, his friends are pleased to see him hitting it off with an attractive neighbor.
2	2	"Breaking Up is Hard to Do"	John Hamburg	Bill Martin	October 3, 2019	5.99
Wade runs into a problem with his dating life when his latest date, Lizzie, turns out to be too dull and annoying for his tastes; he finds that none of his friends can offer much help since none of them have dated in years. Good-natured to a fault, Wade proves unable to break things off with Lizzie even when Michelle brings in her sister Meg to talk some sense into him. Grace starts leaving home without her father's knowledge, which upsets him until he discovers that his daughter has been secretly taking pictures for her Instagram account so she can feel some sense of normalcy. Once the two reconcile, they talk and Wade recognizes that he does not have to stay in an unhappy relationship, giving him the courage to dump Lizzie. Ben's son Noah tries to impress Natalie by eating a bag of sour candy, only to wind up with an upset stomach.
3	3	"Widow's Group"	John Hamburg	Mike Schiff	October 10, 2019	5.15
Convinced that Wade has an anger problem, his friends force him to go to a widows support group, where he happens to be the only male attendee present. At first, he sees no point in returning since the group talks about nothing but sex, and he feels that he does not have an anger problem. Delia tells him to speak up the next time, which leads to him expressing his anger at other married couples that haven't suffered like he has. The other widows explain to him that he needs to accept his anger in order to move on. After a night of heavy drinking and partying, Wade barely wakes up in time for Natalie's match, and afterwards tells his friends his new-found revelations. He also tells Grace, who's been feeling left out now that the rest of her family aren't so close anymore, that she will never have to worry about him leaving her.
4	4	"The Unicorn and the Catfish"	Matt Sohn	Christine Zander	October 17, 2019	5.23
Wade's friends admit that they regularly access his dating profile to spy on him, so he retaliates by changing the password. Forrest then comes up with the idea of creating a fake profile for a woman he names "Zoya" and links it to Wade's account to continue spying. To Forrest's surprise, he comes to enjoy texting his friend as Zoya, upsetting Delia who feels neglected. Unbeknownst to Forrest, Wade is aware of his deception and, goaded by his daughters, forces Forrest to delete the profile by asking Zoya out. The next day, he pranks Forrest by pretending to be upset, but unintentionally hurts his friend's feelings by mocking him. Recognizing that they need to talk to each other as themselves, the two patch things up. Forrest and Delia decide that they want to save up for a boat for when they both retire.
5	5	"No Small Parts"	Todd Holland	Jason Belleville	October 24, 2019	5.87
Grace's drama teacher, Mr. Kersey, casts her as Audrey in the school's upcoming performance of Little Shop of Horrors. However, Wade soon learns that he did so only because he was sorry about Jill's death, and that Grace is in fact terrified about performing on stage. He gives her the option to quit, and so she decides to do so. Ben signs commitment-phobic Delia and Forrest up to run the soccer field snack stand, which turns into a disaster as Delia refuses to sell junk food and drives away all of her customers by offering healthy snacks. Ben then admits he signed them on to volunteer once a month and at tournaments. After her father pushes her to not give up, Grace stays in the musical and gives a stellar debut performance. Wade then tells his daughter how much Jill would have been proud of her.
6	6	"Three Men Out"	Matthew A. Cherry	Chris Kelly	November 7, 2019	5.89
After a date ends badly, Wade decides to take advantage of his kids being away for the weekend and have a guy's night with Forrest and Ben; both decline, citing prior commitments. Disappointed, Wade goes out to a bar to drink alone. Ben and Forrest then show up out of the blue, having decided that they need to be Wade's wingmen so he can score. Unfortunately, neither has much success, and they are ready to leave until Wade pushes Ben to use his "Captain Cristal" personality to make him the center of attention. Forrest gets a kiss on the cheek, which he takes as proof of unfaithfulness to Delia and leaves. Michelle shows up, having seen a picture of Ben surrounded by attractive women, and takes him home. Wade pays his tab and goes home as well, only to realize that the bartender, Lena, left him her number written on a napkin.
7	7	"Wade Delayed"	Kabir Akhtar	Jacque Edmonds Cofer	November 14, 2019	5.63
Wade has to go to Atlanta for a business trip, but when his return flight is delayed, he gets Delia to pick up his daughters from school. Grace takes advantage of his absence by lying to Delia about needing to go to a neighbor's house to study. While on the plane, Wade suffers a panic attack when he realizes he could die, and two fellow passengers help calm him down. One of them, Ava, seems to be interested in Wade, but when they land, she turns down his offer of a drink. Michelle and Delia find Grace when she fails to show up for dinner and scold her; Michelle insists, however, that they not tell Wade a thing. Wade comes to collect his children and tells the group that since he now realizes not all women are into him, he needs them to help keep him grounded so he does not get too cocky.
8	8	"Turkeys and Traditions"	Dean Holland	Skander Halim & Gina Ippolito	November 21, 2019	5.65
Thanksgiving is coming up, which unnerves Wade as he always counted on Jill to arrange everything. Nevertheless, he and the girls decide to try anyway, inviting Wade's friends as well as Jill's sister Allison and her family. This quickly causes a slew of problems: Allison starts fighting with Delia out of jealousy that Jill treated her more like a sister, Ben and Michelle argue over how to cook the turkey, no one is coordinating anything, and the girls are discouraged by their inability to cook one of Jill's best dishes. Wade finds his wife's cookbook, but this only serves to further dampen his spirits. Just when it seems nothing will work out, the dish comes out perfectly. Inspired, Wade decides to dedicate the entire meal to Jill's memory, noting that without her, none of them would be together.
9	9	"No Pressure"	Alex Reid	Sophia Lear	December 5, 2019	5.74
For Ben and Michelle's anniversary party, Wade gets his friend and fellow widow Caroline to pose as his girlfriend when Delia again tries to set him up, this time with her colleague Anna. Ben hires a caterer to take the pressure off his wife to cook, but miscalculates how much food to purchase and winds up forcing Michelle to cook boxed macaroni instead to feed their guests. The experience pulls them closer together when Michelle admits that she's willing to take the pressure in order to make their anniversary special. To Wade's surprise, he hits it off with Anna, convincing him to end his fake relationship with Caroline. When he goes to see Anna, they kiss. Delia is delighted that for the first time since Jill passed away, Wade is now in a serious relationship.
10	10	"Anna and the Unicorn"	Jay Karas	Howard Jordan, Jr.	December 12, 2019	5.46
Wade's relationship with Anna is going steady, but he keeps putting off telling his kids while continually agreeing to his girlfriend's requests for date nights. The result is that the girls are left unsupervised, and wind up throwing a huge party with boys against their father's rules. Wade realizes that he can't be a good dad and keep seeing Anna every night, so the two agree to start spending less time together. Grace catches them kissing, and tells Wade that if he really loves Anna, he shouldn't have to worry about getting her approval. Meanwhile, Delia becomes unreasonably obsessed with including Michelle in all the activities she's doing with Anna.
11	11	"If It Doesn't Spark Joy"	Dean Holland	Eden Dranger	January 9, 2020	4.75
Michelle asks Wade to throw a yard sale so she can get rid of some things. Everyone is asked to contribute something, which upsets Grace and Natalie as they don't want to sell anything that reminds them of their mother. Delia tells them to do it anyway, but has a change of heart when she realizes how much she misses Jill; the girls give her all of it for free. Wade arranges for his kids to leave the house that night so he can finally consummate his relationship with Anna, but the two break up when Anna tells Wade she will never be comfortable dating him as long as he still has feelings for his late wife. Wade decides that he needs to address his grief before he can date again.
12	12	"It Isn't Romantic"	Betsy Thomas & Alex Reid	Bill Martin	January 16, 2020	5.62
Ben and Delia take charge while Michelle is recovering at home from having her gallbladder removed, which Delia insists is necessary to promote proper healing. Wade's fellow widows encourage him to focus less on dating and more on casual hook-ups, which makes him uncomfortable. He takes Noah with him to do some contracting work, and the two discuss Wade's issues. Delia becomes concerned that Michelle is emotionally hurt by the thought that she isn't needed, and forces Ben to help her screw things up to raise his wife's spirits. Forrest discovers that he has a knack for fashion while shopping for clothes. Tired of thinking, Wade goes to Caroline's house for sex.
13	13	"Worst Case Scenario"	John Hamburg	Jacque Edmonds Cofer	January 30, 2020	5.76
After a health scare, Wade learns that his medical information is severely outdated and that he does not have a proper will. Cynthia, a widowed lawyer, agrees to help him pro bono, and informs Wade that he needs to decide who will get custody of his daughters if he dies. Michelle asks Ben to get a vasectomy now that they have four kids, which he refuses to do until Forrest talks him into it. Wade sparks an argument by choosing Delia over Michelle; upset by the lack of support, he decides to give Allison custody instead but later changes his mind and instead asks all of his friends to raise his kids together, recognizing that they all have positive contributions to offer.
14	14	"The Wade Beneath My Wings"	Bill Purple	Jason Belleville	February 6, 2020	6.06
Forrest takes Wade's advice and challenges his boss at work; this gets him fired and leaves Delia angrily blaming Wade for being irresponsible. Ben lands a huge contract doing audio installation for a hotel and starts spending lavishly, which offends Michelle's sense of fiscal restraint. The two talk it over, and Ben compromises, agreeing to use the money from the hotel account to start college funds for their children. Forrest sets up a job profile and lands an interview, which he passes with Wade's encouragement. However, when the job turns out to be exactly the same as his old one, Forrest decides that he owes it to himself to figure out if there's something more he wants out of life.
15	15	"Everyone's a Winner"	Matt Sohn	Chris Kelly	February 13, 2020	5.97
Wade has a bad date with Heather, the mother of Natalie's friend Jordyn. When Natalie is not invited to Jordyn's birthday party, she blames her dad. Ben picks a fight with Vanessa, who coaches his daughter's basketball team, and is banned from attending games. Michelle forces him to apologize, and Ben acknowledges that he should trust Vanessa's judgment as a coach. Forrest, having quit his job, becomes obsessed with the "porch pirate" stealing his packages. Delia confronts him, and they agree he needs to find a new job. After discovering that he misplaced Natalie's invitation, Wade has to make a humiliating apology to a vindictive Heather.
16	16	"The Client"	Rebecca Asher	Christine Zander & Sophia Lear	February 20, 2020	5.90
Denny, a newly divorced client, hires Wade for a job and takes advantage of their relationship by trying to make Wade his wingman for picking up girls. Meg, a professional bookkeeper, does an audit of Wade's business and informs him he's in worse financial shape then he realized; despite the news, Wade decides to cancel his arrangement with Denny. Annoyed with Forrest's inability to find work, Delia insists that they argue to "get it all out". Afterwards, however, they realize they love each other too much to fight. Wade ultimately chooses to help Denny get his life back together and finish the job, and Denny returns the favor by giving Wade the pay he's owed early.
17	17	"Caroline, No"	Kabir Akhtar	Jake Lasker	March 5, 2020	5.45
Wade continues his casual hookups with Caroline, but becomes concerned that she might be in love with him. It turns out to be the opposite: when Wade discovers Caroline has been seeing someone, he gets jealous and proceeds to act out during a meeting of the support group. He and Caroline decide that they can still be friends, but Wade feels he isn't the guy who can hook up with someone and not develop feelings for them. Delia and Michelle try to connect with Grace, who eventually shares her bad experience with a crush at school. The two women tell her that being young means you get to make all kinds of mistakes, which she passes along to her dad.
18	18	"No Matter What the Future Brings"	Alex Reid	Mike Schiff	March 12, 2020	5.79
Grace is set to go to her first high school dance, but when her date comes down with pinkeye, she decides not to go. Wade intervenes by persuading her ex-boyfriend Andrew to take her instead, and Grace restarts her relationship with him. Ben and Michelle attend the preschool graduation of their youngest child, while Forrest finally gets a new job. While celebrating with Wade, the group realizes how many years have passed and how old they've all gotten. Michelle is inspired to go back to college and finish her degree now that she has more free time. Delia tells her husband that she wants to find new experiences to share with him. Later that day, Wade goes to the cemetery to mark Jill's birthday at her grave and helps a woman catch an injured skunk, though not before it sprays both of them. At home, he tells his friends that he can't stop thinking about her.

=== Season 2 (2020–21) ===
No. overall	No. in season	Title	Directed by	Written by	Original air date	U.S. viewers (millions)
19	1	"There's Something About Whoever-She-Was"	John Hamburg	Bill Martin	November 12, 2020	4.08
Wade develops an obsession with finding the woman from the cemetery, worrying his friends. A month later, with Wade close to giving up, Delia finds a potential clue to her location. However, the group makes a pact not to reveal this to Wade. Forrest eventually caves and reveals it anyway, and Wade tracks the woman to an elementary school, where he leaves after seeing her with another man. Michelle is placed on the waiting list for her dream college, but after the school accepts her, she turns them down without hesitation to go to a college closer to her home. The woman tracks down Wade and introduces herself as a divorcee named Shannon. Flush with joy, Wade collects her phone number for later.
20	2	"It's Complicated"	John Hamburg	Mike Schiff	November 19, 2020	3.90
21	3	"It's the Thought That Counts"	Matthew A. Cherry	Howard Jordan, Jr.	December 3, 2020	3.69
22	4	"Work It"	Matt Sohn	Jason Belleville	December 17, 2020	3.36
23	5	"The First Supper"	Betsy Thomas	Jacque Edmonds Cofer	January 21, 2021	3.55
24	6	"Overnight Sensation"	Amy Coughlin	Chris Kelly	January 28, 2021	3.12
25	7	"Swerve and Volley"	Dean Holland	Sophia Lear	February 4, 2021	3.16
26	8	"No Exit"	Dean Holland	Gina Ippolito & Skander Halim	February 11, 2021	4.05
27	9	"A Big Move"	Kabir Akhtar	Christine Zander	February 18, 2021	3.76
28	10	"In Memory Of..."	Angela Tortu	Jason Belleville	February 25, 2021	3.76
29	11	"So Far Away"	Lauren Hennessey	Mike Schiff	March 4, 2021	3.81
30	12	"Out With the Old"	Pete Chatmon	Teleplay by : Jacque Edmonds Cofer; Story by : Jake Lasker	March 18, 2021	3.43
31	13	"Put Your Mask on First"	Angela Tortu	Bill Martin	March 18, 2021	3.19

== Production ==
=== Development ===
On February 6, 2019, it was announced that CBS had given the production a pilot order. On May 9, 2019, it was announced that the production had been given a series order. The series was created by Bill Martin and Mike Schiff, who were also expected to executive produce, alongside Aaron Kaplan, Dana Honor, Wendi Trilling, and Peyton Reed. The production companies involved with the series are Trill TV, Kapital Entertainment and CBS Television Studios. On May 15, 2019, it was announced that the series would premiere in the fall of 2019 and air on Thursdays at 8:30 p.m. The series debuted on September 26, 2019. On October 22, 2019, the series received a back order of five episodes. On May 6, 2020, CBS renewed the series for a second season which premiered on November 12, 2020. On May 15, 2021, CBS canceled the series after two seasons.

=== Casting ===
In March 2019, it was announced that Walton Goggins, Rob Corddry, Michaela Watkins, Omar Benson Miller and Maya Lynne Robinson had been cast in the pilot's starring roles. Along with the announcement of the series order, it was reported that Ruby Jay and Makenzie Moss had joined the main cast. On October 7, 2020, it was announced that Natalie Zea was set to reprise her role as Shannon, the woman with whom Wade had a connection in the first season finale.

== Release ==
=== Marketing ===
On May 15, 2019, CBS released the first official trailer for the series.

== Reception ==
=== Critical response ===
On Rotten Tomatoes, the series holds an approval rating of 85% with an average rating of 6.87/10, based on 27 reviews. The website's critical consensus states, "Warm and funny, The Unicorn finds humor in unexpected places and shows off a whole new side of the talented Walton Goggins." On Metacritic, it has a weighted average score of 65 out of 100, based on 13 critics, indicating "generally favorable reviews".

=== Ratings ===
==== Overall ====
Viewership and ratings per season of The Unicorn
Season	Timeslot (ET)	Episodes	First aired		Last aired		TV season	Viewership rank	Avg. viewers (millions)	18–49 rank	Avg. 18–49 rating
Season	Timeslot (ET)	Episodes	Date	Viewers (millions)	Date	Viewers (millions)	TV season	Viewership rank	Avg. viewers (millions)	18–49 rank	Avg. 18–49 rating
1	Thursday 8.30 p.m.	18	September 26, 2019	6.04	March 12, 2020	5.79	2019–20	48	7.10	61	1.0
2	Thursday 9.30 p.m. (1–11, 13); Thursday 9.00 p.m. (12)	13	November 12, 2020	4.08	March 18, 2021	3.19	2020–21	60	5.05	80	0.7

==== Season 1 ====
Viewership and ratings per episode of The Unicorn
No.	Title	Air date	Rating/share (18–49)	Viewers (millions)	DVR (18–49)	DVR viewers (millions)	Total (18–49)	Total viewers (millions)
1	"Pilot"	September 26, 2019	0.8/4	6.04	0.5	2.05	1.3	8.10
2	"Breaking Up Is Hard to Do"	October 3, 2019	0.8/4	5.99	0.4	1.73	1.2	7.72
3	"Widow's Group"	October 10, 2019	0.7/4	5.15	0.4	1.59	1.1	6.75
4	"The Unicorn and the Catfish"	October 17, 2019	0.7/4	5.23	0.3	1.41	1.0	6.64
5	"No Small Parts"	October 24, 2019	0.8/4	5.87	0.3	1.41	1.1	7.29
6	"Three Men Out"	November 7, 2019	0.8/4	5.89	0.2	1.36	1.0	7.25
7	"Wade Delayed"	November 14, 2019	0.7/4	5.63	—N/a	1.28	—N/a	6.91
8	"Turkeys and Traditions"	November 21, 2019	0.7/4	5.65	—N/a	1.34	—N/a	7.00
9	"No Pressure"	December 5, 2019	0.8/4	5.74	0.3	1.28	1.1	7.03
10	"Anna and the Unicorn"	December 12, 2019	0.7/4	5.46	—N/a	1.20	—N/a	6.67
11	"If It Doesn't Spark Joy"	January 9, 2020	0.6/3	4.75	0.3	1.50	0.9	6.25
12	"It Isn't Romantic"	January 16, 2020	0.6/3	5.62	—N/a	1.54	—N/a	7.16
13	"Worst Case Scenario"	January 30, 2020	0.6/4	5.76	—N/a	1.30	—N/a	7.06
14	"The Wade Beneath My Wings"	February 6, 2020	0.7	6.06	—N/a	1.30	—N/a	7.36
15	"Everyone's a Winner"	February 13, 2020	0.8	5.97	—N/a	1.41	—N/a	7.38
16	"The Client"	February 20, 2020	0.6	5.90	—N/a	1.36	—N/a	7.26
17	"Caroline, No"	March 5, 2020	0.6	5.45	—N/a	1.30	—N/a	6.76
18	"No Matter What the Future Brings"	March 12, 2020	0.7	5.79	—N/a	1.31	—N/a	7.10

==== Season 2 ====
Viewership and ratings per episode of The Unicorn
No.	Title	Air date	Rating (18–49)	Viewers (millions)	DVR (18–49)	DVR viewers (millions)	Total (18–49)	Total viewers (millions)
1	"There's Something About Whoever-She-Was"	November 12, 2020	0.4	4.08	0.4	1.58	0.8	5.66
2	"It's Complicated"	November 19, 2020	0.5	3.90	—N/a	—N/a	—N/a	—N/a
3	"It's the Thought That Counts"	December 3, 2020	0.5	3.69	—N/a	—N/a	—N/a	—N/a
4	"Work It"	December 17, 2020	0.4	3.36	—N/a	—N/a	—N/a	—N/a
5	"The First Supper"	January 21, 2021	0.4	3.55	—N/a	—N/a	—N/a	—N/a
6	"Overnight Sensation"	January 28, 2021	0.4	3.12	—N/a	—N/a	—N/a	—N/a
7	"Swerve and Volley"	February 4, 2021	0.4	3.16	—N/a	—N/a	—N/a	—N/a
8	"No Exit"	February 11, 2021	0.6	4.05	0.2	1.46	0.8	5.51
9	"A Big Move"	February 18, 2021	0.5	3.76	0.2	1.45	0.7	5.21
10	"In Memory Of..."	February 25, 2021	0.5	3.76	0.3	1.49	0.8	5.26
11	"So Far Away"	March 4, 2021	0.6	3.81	0.2	1.37	0.8	5.19
12	"Out With the Old"	March 18, 2021	0.4	3.43	—N/a	—N/a	—N/a	—N/a
13	"Put Your Mask on First"	March 18, 2021	0.4	3.19	—N/a	—N/a	—N/a	—N/a

== Home media ==
The first season was released on DVD on July 21, 2020. The second season was released on DVD on July 13, 2021.
