= 2025–26 Canadian network television schedule =

Television schedule for the five major English commercial broadcast networks in Canada

The 2025–26 network television schedule for the five major English commercial broadcast networks in Canada covers primetime hours from September 2025 through August 2026. The schedule is followed by a list per network of returning series, new series, and series canceled after the 2024–25 television season, for Canadian, American, and other series.

Global was first to announce its fall schedule on June 2, 2025, followed by Citytv on June 3, CTV on June 5, and CBC on June 8. CBC was first to announce its winter schedule on November 20, 2025, followed by Global on December 11, and CTV on December 16. Yes TV (including indieNET) and Omni Television are not included as member television stations have local flexibility over most of their schedules. CTV 2 is not included on Saturday as it normally only schedules encore programming in primetime on Saturdays.

== Legend ==
- Grey indicates encore programming including repeats.
- Blue-grey indicates news programming.
- Light green indicates sporting events/coverage.
- Red indicates movies, specials, series being burned off and other irregularly scheduled programs.
- Light gold indicates programming produced outside of Canada.
- Light yellow indicates the current schedule.

== Schedule ==
- New series to Canadian television are highlighted in **bold**.
- Repeat airings or same-day rebroadcasts are indicated by **(R)**.
- All times given are in Canadian Eastern Time and Pacific Time (except for some live events or specials, including most sports, which are given in Eastern Time). Subtract one hour for Central time for most programs (excluding CBC). Airtimes may vary in the Atlantic and Mountain times and do not necessarily align with U.S. stations in the Mountain time zone. Add one half-hour to Atlantic Time schedule for Newfoundland time. (See also: Effects of time zones on North American broadcasting)
- Dates (e.g., (9/13)) indicate the first month and day of a program in its regular timeslot, and also the time slot premiere (the season premiere date can be used here if it’s also the time slot premiere, otherwise include the season premiere as a separate note).
- From February 6 to 22, 2026 and March 6 to 15, 2026, CBC coverage of the 2026 Winter Olympics and 2026 Winter Paralympics in Milan and Cortina d'Ampezzo, Italy live or taped in all time zones, encompassing all of primetime those days.

=== Sunday ===
Network		7:00 p.m.	7:30 p.m.	8:00 p.m.	8:30 p.m.	9:00 p.m.	9:30 p.m.	10:00 p.m.	10:30 p.m.
CBC	Fall	Heartland (10/5)		The Great Canadian Baking Show (10/5)		**Locals Welcome** (10/5)	**Chuck and the First Peoples Kitchen** (10/5)	The National	
CBC	Mid-fall	Heartland (10/5)		The Great British Baking Show (11/30)		**Locals Welcome** (10/5)	**Chuck and the First Peoples Kitchen** (10/5)	The National	
CBC	Winter	various Winter Olympic qualifying events						The National	
Citytv	Fall	Family Feud (R)		The Simpsons	Universal Basic Guys	Krapopolis	Bob's Burgers	Hudson & Rex	
Citytv	Winter	Come Dine with Me Canada (R)		Family Guy (2/22)	Universal Basic Guys	American Dad! (2/22)	Family Guy (2/22)	Hudson & Rex	
Citytv	Spring	Property Brothers: Under Pressure (R)		Family Guy (2/22)	Bob's Burgers (4/26)	American Dad! (2/22)	Family Guy (R)	Hudson & Rex	
CTV	Fall	NFL on Fox/NFL on CBS overrun (continued to game completion)	NFL on CTV Live	Football Night in America	Sunday Night Football				
CTV	Spring	Sullivan's Crossing (R)		Sullivan's Crossing (3/22)		Tracker (3/1)		**Betrayal: Secrets & Lies** (3/22)	
CTV 2	Fall	The Big Bang Theory (R)		CTV Movie					
CTV 2	Winter	Battle of the Generations		CTV Movie					
CTV 2	Spring	Battle of the Generations		NBC Sunday Night Basketball					
Global	Fall	60 Minutes		Murder in a Small Town		**The Road** (10/19)		Various programming	
Global	Winter	60 Minutes		Global Movie					
Global	Spring	60 Minutes		Family Law (3/1)		various programming		Watson (3/1)	

=== Monday ===
Network		7:00 p.m.	7:30 p.m.	8:00 p.m.	8:30 p.m.	9:00 p.m.	9:30 p.m.	10:00 p.m.	10:30 p.m.
CBC	Fall	Coronation Street	Family Feud Canada (10/6)	Murdoch Mysteries (10/6)		**DI Ray** (10/6)		The National	
CBC	Winter	Coronation Street	Family Feud Canada (10/6)	Murdoch Mysteries (10/6)		Saint-Pierre (1/5)		The National	
Citytv	Fall	Family Feud (R)		Hudson & Rex (9/22)		**TV We Love** (10/13)		Brilliant Minds (9/22)	
Citytv	Winter	Family Feud (R)		American Idol (1/26)				Brilliant Minds (9/22)	
Citytv	Spring	Family Feud (R)		American Idol (1/26)				Hudson & Rex (R)	
CTV	Fall	Tracker		The Voice				**Celebrity Weakest Link**	
CTV	Mid-fall	Tracker		St. Denis Medical (11/3)	**Stumble** (11/10)	The Voice		**Celebrity Weakest Link**	
CTV	Winter	Etalk	St. Denis Medical	Extracted (1/26)		**Memory of a Killer** (1/26)		The Rookie (1/26)	
CTV	Spring	Etalk	The Big Bang Theory (R)	Extracted (1/26)		**Memory of a Killer** (1/26)		The Rookie (1/26)	
CTV 2	Fall	The Big Bang Theory (R)	Etalk	Monday Night Football					
CTV 2	Winter	The Big Bang Theory (R)	Etalk	CTV Movie				Criminal Minds (R)	
CTV 2	Spring	The Big Bang Theory (R)	Etalk	St. Denis Medical	**The Fall and Rise of Reggie Dinkins** (2/23)	The Voice			
Global	Fall	The Goldbergs (R)	ET	The Neighborhood (10/13)	**DMV** (10/13)	FBI (10/13)		Watson (10/13)	
Global	Late-fall	ET	**The Paper** (11/10)	The Neighborhood (10/13)	**DMV** (10/13)	FBI (10/13)		Watson (10/13)	
Global	Winter	The Goldbergs (R)	ET	The Neighborhood (10/13)	**DMV** (10/13)	The Wall (1/5)		NCIS: Origins (R)	
Global	Spring	The Goldbergs (R)	ET	The Neighborhood (10/13)	**DMV** (10/13)	FBI (2/23)		**CIA** (2/23)	

=== Tuesday ===
Network		7:00 p.m.	7:30 p.m.	8:00 p.m.	8:30 p.m.	9:00 p.m.	9:30 p.m.	10:00 p.m.	10:30 p.m.
CBC	Fall	Coronation Street	Family Feud Canada (10/7)	This Hour Has 22 Minutes (9/16)	The Just for Laughs Galas	Animal Control (9/16)	The New Wave of Standup (9/16)	The National	
CBC	Mid-fall	Coronation Street	Family Feud Canada (10/7)	This Hour Has 22 Minutes (9/16)	The Just for Laughs Galas	Animal Control (9/16)	Halifax Comedy Festival	The National	
CBC	Winter	Coronation Street	Family Feud Canada (10/7)	This Hour Has 22 Minutes (9/16)	Still Standing (1/6)	Small Achievable Goals (1/6)	**Austin** (1/6)	The National	
CBC	Spring	Coronation Street	Family Feud Canada (10/7)	This Hour Has 22 Minutes (9/16)	Still Standing (R)	The Just for Laughs Galas (3/24)		The National	
Citytv	Fall	Family Feud (R)		Dancing with the Stars (9/30)				**On Brand with Jimmy Fallon**	
Citytv	Winter	Family Feud (R)		NBA Coast 2 Coast Tuesday					
Citytv	Late winter	Family Feud (R)		Hudson & Rex (2/3)		**Blue Skies** (2/24)		Hudson & Rex (R)	
Citytv	Spring	Family Feud (R)		**The Price Is Right Tonight** (3/10)		**Blue Skies** (2/24)		Hudson & Rex (R)	
CTV	Fall	Etalk	The Big Bang Theory (R)	MasterChef Canada (10/2)		The Traitors Canada		High Potential (9/16)	
CTV	Winter	**Best Medicine** (1/6)		Will Trent (1/6)		High Potential (1/6)		The Rookie (1/6)	
CTV	Spring	**Best Medicine** (1/6)		Will Trent (1/6)		High Potential (1/6)		**R.J. Decker** (3/3)	
CTV 2	Fall	The Big Bang Theory (R)	Etalk	CTV Movie					
CTV 2	Spring	The Big Bang Theory (R)	Etalk	NBA Coast 2 Coast Tuesday					
Global	Fall	The Goldbergs (R)	ET	NCIS (10/14)		NCIS: Origins (10/14)		NCIS: Sydney (10/14)	
Global	Winter	The Goldbergs (R)	ET	**Harlan Coben's Final Twist** (1/14)		Doc (1/6)		NCIS (R)	
Global	Spring	Doc (3/3)		NCIS (3/3)		NCIS: Origins (3/3)		NCIS: Sydney (3/3)	

=== Wednesday ===
Network		7:00 p.m.	7:30 p.m.	8:00 p.m.	8:30 p.m.	9:00 p.m.	9:30 p.m.	10:00 p.m.	10:30 p.m.
CBC	Fall	Coronation Street	Family Feud Canada (10/8)	**Parenthood** (9/17)		The Passionate Eye (9/17)		The National	
CBC	Mid-fall	Coronation Street	Family Feud Canada (10/8)	**The Assembly**		The Passionate Eye (9/17)		The National	
CBC	Late-fall	Coronation Street	Family Feud Canada (10/8)	The Nature of Things		The Passionate Eye (9/17)		The National	
CBC	Winter	Coronation Street	Family Feud Canada (10/8)	Wild Cards (1/7)		Allegiance (1/7)		The National	
Citytv	Fall	The Golden Bachelor		Chicago Med (10/1)		Chicago Fire (10/1)		Chicago P.D. (10/1)	
Citytv	Winter	The Price Is Right at Night (1/7)		Chicago Med (10/1)		Chicago Fire (10/1)		Chicago P.D. (10/1)	
Citytv	Spring	Family Feud (R)		Chicago Med (10/1)		Chicago Fire (10/1)		Chicago P.D. (10/1)	
CTV	Fall	The Floor (9/24)		Shifting Gears (10/1)	Georgie & Mandy's First Marriage (10/8)	Georgie & Mandy's First Marriage (R)	The Amazing Race (9/25)		
CTV	Winter	Etalk	Shifting Gears (1/7)	The Masked Singer (1/7)		Fear Factor: House of Fear (1/14)		Shark Tank (1/7)	
CTV	Spring	Etalk	Scrubs (2/25)	MasterChef (4/15)		The Floor (4/8)		Shark Tank (1/7)	
CTV 2	Fall	The Big Bang Theory (R)	Etalk	The Rookie (R)				Shark Tank (9/24)	
CTV 2	Winter	The Big Bang Theory (R)	Etalk	The Rookie (R)				Criminal Minds (R)	
Global	Fall	The Goldbergs (R)	ET	Survivor (9/24)			Abbott Elementary (10/1)	Doc	
Global	Winter	The Goldbergs (R)	ET	Hollywood Squares (1/7)		Abbott Elementary (1/7)	Ghosts (R)	**Harlan Coben's Final Twist** (R)	
Global	Late winter	The Goldbergs (R)	ET	Survivor (2/25)			Abbott Elementary (2/25)	**Harlan Coben's Final Twist** (R)	
Global	Spring	The Goldbergs (R)	ET	Survivor (2/25)			**America's Culinary Cup** (3/4)		Hollywood Squares

=== Thursday ===
Network		7:00 p.m.	7:30 p.m.	8:00 p.m.	8:30 p.m.	9:00 p.m.	9:30 p.m.	10:00 p.m.	10:30 p.m.
CBC	Fall	Coronation Street	Family Feud Canada (10/9)	Dragons' Den (9/25)		Plan B (9/25)		The National	
CBC	Mid-fall	Coronation Street	Family Feud Canada (10/9)	Dragons' Den (9/25)		**Diamonds & Plastic**		The National	
CBC	Late-fall	Coronation Street	Family Feud Canada (10/9)	Dragons' Den (9/25)		**The Assembly** (11/7)		The National	
CBC	Winter	Coronation Street	Family Feud Canada (10/9)	Dragons' Den (9/25)		The Nature of Things (1/8)		The National	
CBC	Spring	Coronation Street	Family Feud Canada (10/9)	**Cirque Life** (3/19)		The Nature of Things (1/8)		The National	
Citytv	Fall	Family Feud (R)		Law & Order (9/25)		Law & Order: Special Victims Unit (9/25)		Law & Order: Organized Crime (9/25)	
Citytv	Winter	Family Feud (R)		Law & Order (9/25)		Law & Order: Special Victims Unit (9/25)		The Hunting Party (1/8)	
Citytv	Spring	The Hunting Party (3/5)		Law & Order (9/25)		Law & Order: Special Victims Unit (9/25)		Law & Order Toronto: Criminal Intent (3/5)	
CTV	Fall	Etalk	The Big Bang Theory (R)	Hell's Kitchen (9/25)		**9-1-1: Nashville** (10/9)		Grey's Anatomy (10/9)	
CTV	Winter	Etalk	The Big Bang Theory (R)	Next Level Chef (1/29)		**9-1-1: Nashville** (10/9)		Grey's Anatomy (10/9)	
CTV	Spring	Etalk	Georgie & Mandy's First Marriage (2/26)	Next Level Chef (1/29)		**9-1-1: Nashville** (10/9)		Grey's Anatomy (10/9)	
CTV 2	Fall	Thursday Night Football Pre-Game		Thursday Night Football					
CTV 2	Winter	The Big Bang Theory (R)	Etalk	New Girl (R)				Criminal Minds (R)	
Global	Fall	ET	Ghosts (10/16)	9-1-1 (10/9)		Matlock (10/16)		Elsbeth (10/16)	
Global	Winter	The Goldbergs (R)	ET	9-1-1 (10/9)		Family Law (1/8)		Elsbeth (R)	
Global	Spring	Abbott Elementary (2/26)	Ghosts (2/26)	9-1-1 (10/9)		Matlock (2/26)		Elsbeth (2/26)	

=== Friday ===
Network		7:00 p.m.	7:30 p.m.	8:00 p.m.	8:30 p.m.	9:00 p.m.	9:30 p.m.	10:00 p.m.	10:30 p.m.
CBC	Fall	Coronation Street		Marketplace (9/26)	About That with Andrew Chang (9/19)	The Fifth Estate (10/10)		The National	
CBC	Winter	Coronation Street	The Legacy Lounge (R)	Marketplace (9/26)	About That with Andrew Chang (9/19)	The Fifth Estate (10/10)		The National	
Citytv	Fall	Family Feud (R)		**On Brand with Jimmy Fallon**		Dateline NBC			
Citytv	Winter	Family Feud (R)		Hudson & Rex (R)		Dateline NBC			
Citytv	Spring	Family Feud (R)		The Price Is Right at Night Canada (R)		Dateline NBC			
CTV	Fall	Etalk	The Big Bang Theory (R)	Celebrity Wheel of Fortune (9/26)		Special Forces: World's Toughest Test		**Boston Blue** (10/17)	
CTV	Late-fall	Etalk	Happy's Place (11/7)	Celebrity Wheel of Fortune (9/26)		Special Forces: World's Toughest Test		**Boston Blue** (10/17)	
CTV	Winter	Etalk	The Big Bang Theory (R)	Celebrity Wheel of Fortune (9/26)		Happy's Place (1/16)	Stumble (1/16)	**Boston Blue** (10/17)	
CTV	Spring	Etalk	The Big Bang Theory (R)	Celebrity Jeopardy!		Happy's Place (1/16)	Stumble (1/16)	**Boston Blue** (10/17)	
CTV 2	Fall	The Big Bang Theory (R)	Etalk	CTV Movie					
Global	Fall	The Goldbergs (R)	ET	**Sheriff Country** (10/17)		Fire Country (10/17)		Crime Beat	

=== Saturday ===
Network		7:00 p.m.	7:30 p.m.	8:00 p.m.	8:30 p.m.	9:00 p.m.	9:30 p.m.	10:00 p.m.	10:30 p.m.
CBC	Fall	Hockey Night in Canada							
Citytv	Fall	Hockey Night in Canada						Hudson & Rex(R)	
CTV	Fall	CTV Movie						Billionaire Murders (R)	
Global	Fall	Border Security: America's Front Line (R)		Murder in a Small Town (R)		Private Eyes (R)		Ransom (R)	
Global	Winter	Border Security: America's Front Line (R)		Family Law (R)		Ransom (R)		Top Chef Canada	

== By network ==
=== CBC ===
Returning series:

- This Hour has 22 Minutes
- Allegiance
- Animal Control
- Dragon's Den
- Family Feud Canada
- The Fifth Estate
- For the Culture with Amanda Parris
- The Great Canadian Baking Show
- Halifax Comedy Festival
- Heartland
- Hockey Night in Canada
- Marketplace
- Murdoch Mysteries
- The National
- The Nature of Things
- The New Wave of Standup
- North of North
- The Passionate Eye
- Plan B
- Saint-Pierre
- Still Standing
- Small Achievable Goals
- Son of a Critch
- Wild Cards

New series:

- The Assembly
- Chuck and the First Peoples Kitchen
- Cirque Life
- Diamonds & Plastic
- DI Ray
- Locals Welcome
- Must Love Dogs
- Parenthood
- Running Smoke

Not returning from 2024–25:

- Bollywed
- Canada's Ultimate Challenge
- Crime Scene Kitchen
- The Knowing
- Paid in Full: The Battle for Black Music
- SkyMed (moved to Paramount+)
- Stuff the British Stole

=== Citytv ===
Returning series:

- American Dad! (moved from Much; shared with CHCH and on demand with Hulu on Disney+)
- American Idol
- The Bachelorette
- Bob's Burgers (shared with CHCH; on demand with Hulu on Disney+)
- Brilliant Minds
- Chicago Fire
- Chicago Med
- Chicago P.D.
- Dateline NBC
- Dancing with the Stars (shared with Disney+)
- Family Guy (shared with CHCH; on demand with Hulu on Disney+)
- The Golden Bachelor
- Hockey Night in Canada
- Hudson & Rex
- The Hunting Party
- Krapopolis
- Law & Order
- Law & Order Toronto: Criminal Intent
- Law & Order: Organized Crime
- Law & Order: Special Victims Unit
- The Simpsons (on demand with Disney+)
- Universal Basic Guys (shared with CHCH)

New series:

- On Brand with Jimmy Fallon
- TV We Love
- Surviving Earth
- The Price Is Right Tonight
- Blue Skies

Not returning from 2024–25:

- The Americas
- Canada's Got Talent
- Found
- The Irrational
- Lopez vs Lopez

=== CTV/CTV 2 ===
Returning series:

- The Amazing Race (USA)
- The Amazing Race Canada
- Battle of the Generations
- Celebrity Jeopardy!
- Celebrity Wheel of Fortune
- CTV Movie
- Etalk
- Extracted
- The Floor (moved from Global)
- Georgie and Mandy's First Marriage
- Grey's Anatomy
- Happy's Place
- Hell's Kitchen
- High Potential (on demand with Hulu on Disney+)
- Kitchen Nightmares
- The Masked Singer
- MasterChef (USA)
- MasterChef Canada
- Monday Night Football
- Next Level Chef
- The Rookie
- Shark Tank
- Shifting Gears (on demand with Disney+)
- Special Forces: World's Toughest Test
- St. Denis Medical
- Sullivan's Crossing
- Sunday Night Football
- Thursday Night Football
- Tracker
- The Traitors Canada
- The Voice
- Will Trent (on demand with Hulu on Disney+)

New series:

- 9-1-1: Nashville (on demand with Hulu on Disney+)
- Best Medicine
- Boston Blue
- Next Level Baker
- Stumble
- Celebrity Weakest Link
- The Fall and Rise of Reggie Dinkins
- Memory of a Killer
- R.J. Decker

Not returning from 2024–25:

- The $100,000 Pyramid
- 9-1-1: Lone Star
- Alert: Missing Persons Unit
- Blue Bloods
- Children Ruin Everything
- The Cleaning Lady
- The Conners
- Doctor Odyssey
- Farming for Love
- Lego Masters
- Mark McKinney Needs a Hobby
- MasterChef Junior
- Night Court
- Rescue: HI-Surf
- Scamanda
- Suits LA
- The Summit

=== Global ===
Returning series:

- 60 Minutes
- 9-1-1 (on demand with Hulu on Disney+)
- Abbott Elementary (on demand with Hulu on Disney+)
- Crime Beat
- Doc
- ET
- Elsbeth
- Fire Country
- Family Law
- FBI
- Ghosts
- Hollywood Squares
- Matlock
- Murder in a Small Town
- NCIS
- NCIS: Origins
- Survivor
- Watson

New series:

- America's Culinary Cup
- CIA
- DMV
- Harlan Coben's Final Twist
- The Road
- Sheriff Country

Not returning from 2024–25:

- Accused
- The Equalizer
- FBI: International
- FBI: Most Wanted
- The Floor (moved to CTV)
- I Can See Your Voice
- Raid the Cage
- S.W.A.T.

== See also ==
- 2025–26 United States network television schedule
