= 2024–25 Canadian network television schedule =

Television schedule for the five major English commercial broadcast networks in Canada

The 2024–25 network television schedule for the five major English commercial broadcast networks in Canada covers primetime hours from September 2024 through August 2025. The schedule is followed by a list per network of returning series, new series, and series canceled after the 2023–24 television season, for Canadian, American, and other series.

CBC Television was first to announce its fall schedule on May 22, 2024 and airdates on August 21, 2024, followed by Citytv on June 3, 2024, Global schedule on June 5, 2024 and airdates on August 26, 2024, and CTV schedule on June 6, 2024 and airdates on August 29, 2024. CBC was first to announce its Winter schedule on November 27, 2024, followed by CTV schedule on December 12, 2024. Yes TV (including indieNET) and Omni Television are not included as member television stations have local flexibility over most of their schedules. CTV 2 is not included on Saturday as it normally only schedules encore programming in primetime on Saturdays.

== Legend ==
- Grey indicates encore programming, including repeats.
- Blue-grey indicates news programming.
- Light green indicates sporting events/coverage.
- Light gold indicates programming produced outside of Canada.
- Red indicates movies and specials.

== Schedule ==
- New series to Canadian television are highlighted in **bold**.
- All times given are in Canadian Eastern Time and Pacific Time (except for some live events or specials, including most sports, which are given in Eastern Time). Subtract one hour for Central time for most programs (excluding CBC). Airtimes may vary in the Atlantic and Mountain times and do not necessarily align with U.S. stations in the Mountain time zone. Add one half-hour to Atlantic Time schedule for Newfoundland time. (See also: Effects of time zones on North American broadcasting)
- Dates (e.g., (9/13)) indicate the first month and day of a program in its regular timeslot, and also the premiere date.

=== Sunday ===
Network		7:00 p.m.	7:30 p.m.	8:00 p.m.	8:30 p.m.	9:00 p.m.	9:30 p.m.	10:00 p.m.	10:30 p.m.
CBC	Fall	Heartland		The Great Canadian Baking Show		Crime Scene Kitchen		The National	
CBC	Winter	The Great British Baking Show			Travel Man: 48 Hours in...	SkyMed		The National	
CBC	Spring	The Great British Baking Show			Travel Man: 48 Hours in...	SkyMed		The National	
CBC	Summer	The Great British Baking Show			Travel Man: 48 Hours in...	SkyMed		The National	
Citytv	Fall	Hudson & Rex (R)		The Simpsons	**Universal Basic Guys**	Bob's Burgers	Krapopolis	Hudson & Rex (R)	
Citytv	Winter	**The Americas**		American Idol				**Grosse Pointe Garden Society**	
Citytv	Spring	**The Americas**		American Idol				Hudson & Rex (R)	
Citytv	Summer	**The Americas**		American Idol				Hudson & Rex (R)	
CTV	Fall	NFL overrun (continued to game completion)	NFL on CTV Live	Football Night in America	NBC Sunday Night Football				
CTV	Winter	The Big Bang Theory (R)	The Big Bang Theory (R)	Tracker		**Suits LA**		The $100,000 Pyramid	
CTV	Spring	Sullivan's Crossing		Tracker		**Suits LA**		The $100,000 Pyramid	
CTV	Summer	Sullivan's Crossing		Tracker		**Suits LA**		The $100,000 Pyramid	
CTV 2		How I Met Your Mother (R)	How I Met Your Mother (R)	CTV Movie					
Global	Fall	60 Minutes		The Floor		The Equalizer		Accused	
Global	Winter	Crime Beat		Family Law		Watson		The Equalizer	
Global	Spring	60 Minutes		Crime Beat (R)		Watson		The Equalizer	
Global	Summer	60 Minutes		Crime Beat (R)		Watson		The Equalizer	

=== Monday ===
Network		7:00 p.m.	7:30 p.m.	8:00 p.m.	8:30 p.m.	9:00 p.m.	9:30 p.m.	10:00 p.m.	10:30 p.m.
CBC	Fall	Coronation Street	Schitt's Creek (R)	Murdoch Mysteries		Plan B		The National	
CBC	Winter	Coronation Street	Family Feud Canada	Murdoch Mysteries		**Saint-Pierre**		The National	
CBC	Spring	Coronation Street	Family Feud Canada	Murdoch Mysteries		**Saint-Pierre**		The National	
CBC	Summer	Coronation Street	Family Feud Canada	Murdoch Mysteries		**Saint-Pierre**		The National	
Citytv	Fall	Family Feud (R)	Family Feud (R)	**The Golden Bachelorette**				**Brilliant Minds**	
Citytv	Winter	Family Feud (R)	Family Feud (R)	The Bachelor				**The Hunting Party**	
Citytv	Spring	Family Feud (R)	Family Feud (R)	American Idol				Chicago Fire (R)	
Citytv	Summer	Family Feud (R)	Family Feud (R)	Bachelor in Paradise				Hudson & Rex (R)	
CTV	Fall	Tracker		9-1-1: Lone Star		**Rescue: HI-Surf**		The Traitors Canada	
CTV	Winter	Etalk	The Big Bang Theory (R)	**Extracted**		**Rescue: HI-Surf**		Sight Unseen	
CTV	Spring	Etalk	The Big Bang Theory (R)	**Extracted**		**Rescue: HI-Surf**		**Paradise**	
CTV	Mid-spring	Etalk	The Big Bang Theory (R)	The Voice				**Yes, Chef!**	
CTV	Summer	Etalk	The Big Bang Theory (R)	American Ninja Warrior				**Yes, Chef!**	
CTV 2	Fall	The Big Bang Theory (R)	Etalk	The Voice				Suits (R)	
CTV 2	Winter	The Big Bang Theory (R)	Etalk	The Voice				Suits (R)	
CTV 2	Spring	The Big Bang Theory (R)	Etalk	The Voice				Suits (R)	
CTV 2	Summer	The Big Bang Theory (R)	Etalk	LEGO Masters		The Conners (R)	The Conners (R)	The Conners (R)	The Conners (R)
Global		The Goldbergs (R)	ET	The Neighborhood	**Poppa's House**	NCIS		**NCIS: Origins**	

=== Tuesday ===
Network		7:00 p.m.	7:30 p.m.	8:00 p.m.	8:30 p.m.	9:00 p.m.	9:30 p.m.	10:00 p.m.	10:30 p.m.
CBC	Fall	Coronation Street	Schitt's Creek (R)	22 Minutes	Still Standing	Animal Control	The New Wave of Standup	The National	
CBC	Winter	Coronation Street	Family Feud Canada	22 Minutes	Son of a Critch	**North of North**	Halifax Comedy Fest	The National	
CBC	Spring	Coronation Street	Family Feud Canada	22 Minutes	Son of a Critch	**Small Achievable Goals**	Halifax Comedy Fest	The National	
CBC	Summer	Coronation Street	Family Feud Canada	22 Minutes	Son of a Critch	**Small Achievable Goals**	Halifax Comedy Fest	The National	
Citytv	Fall	Family Feud (R)	Family Feud (R)	Dancing with the Stars				The Irrational	
Citytv	Winter	Family Feud (R)	Family Feud (R)	Hudson & Rex		Deal or No Deal Island		The Irrational	
Citytv	Spring	Family Feud (R)	Family Feud (R)	Canada's Got Talent		Hudson & Rex (R)		Hudson & Rex (R)	
Citytv	Summer	Family Feud (R)	Family Feud (R)	America's Got Talent				**Destination X**	
CTV	Fall	Etalk	The Big Bang Theory (R)	**St. Denis Medical**	Night Court	The Voice		**High Potential**	
CTV	Winter	Kitchen Nightmares		Will Trent		**High Potential**		The Rookie	
CTV	Spring	Etalk	The Big Bang Theory (R)	Will Trent		The Rookie		Night Court	**St. Denis Medical**
CTV	Summer	Etalk	The Big Bang Theory (R)	Will Trent		The Rookie		Night Court	**St. Denis Medical**
CTV 2	Fall	The Big Bang Theory (R)	Etalk	Transplant (R)		Transplant (R)		Suits (R)	
CTV 2	Winter	The Big Bang Theory (R)	Etalk	**St. Denis Medical**	Night Court	Transplant (R)		Suits (R)	
CTV 2	Spring	The Big Bang Theory (R)	Etalk	The Cleaning Lady		Alert: Missing Persons Unit		Criminal Minds (R)	
CTV 2	Summer	The Big Bang Theory (R)	Etalk	The Cleaning Lady		Alert: Missing Persons Unit		Criminal Minds (R)	
Global	Fall	The Goldbergs (R)	ET	FBI		FBI: International		FBI: Most Wanted	
Global	Winter	FBI: International		FBI		**Doc**		FBI: Most Wanted	
Global	Spring	The Goldbergs (R)	ET	FBI		FBI: International		FBI: Most Wanted	
Global	Summer	The Goldbergs (R)	ET	NCIS (R)		**The Snake**		NCIS: Sydney (R)	

=== Wednesday ===
Network		7:00 p.m.	7:30 p.m.	8:00 p.m.	8:30 p.m.	9:00 p.m.	9:30 p.m.	10:00 p.m.	10:30 p.m.
CBC	Fall	Coronation Street	Schitt's Creek (R)	**The Knowing**		The Passionate Eye		The National	
CBC	Mid-fall	Coronation Street	Schitt's Creek (R)	**The Battle for Black Music**		The Passionate Eye		The National	
CBC	Winter	Coronation Street	Family Feud Canada	Wild Cards		Allegiance		The National	
CBC	Spring	Coronation Street	Family Feud Canada	Wild Cards		Allegiance		The National	
CBC	Summer	Coronation Street	Family Feud Canada	Wild Cards		Allegiance		The National	
Citytv		Family Feud (R)	Family Feud (R)	Chicago Med		Chicago Fire		Chicago P.D.	
CTV	Fall	Etalk	The Big Bang Theory (R)	The Masked Singer		**Mark McKinney Needs a Hobby**	**The Summit**		
CTV	Winter	Etalk	The Big Bang Theory (R)	**Shifting Gears**	Children Ruin Everything	Celebrity Jeopardy!		Various programming	
CTV	Late winter	Etalk	The Big Bang Theory (R)	The Masked Singer		**Shifting Gears**	The Amazing Race		
CTV	Spring	Etalk	The Conners	The Masked Singer		The Big Bang Theory (R)	The Amazing Race		
CTV	Summer	Etalk	The Big Bang Theory (R)	MasterChef		**Gordon Ramsay's Secret Service**		Battle of the Generations	
CTV 2	Fall	The Big Bang Theory (R)	Etalk	Sullivan's Crossing (R)		The Conners (R)	The Conners (R)	Suits (R)	
CTV 2	Winter	The Big Bang Theory (R)	Etalk	Special Forces: World's Toughest Test		Special Forces: World's Toughest Test		Suits (R)	
CTV 2	Spring	The Big Bang Theory (R)	Etalk	How I Met Your Mother (R)	How I Met Your Mother (R)	Celebrity Jeopardy!		Suits (R)	
CTV 2	Summer	The Big Bang Theory (R)	Etalk	Celebrity Wheel of Fortune		Celebrity Jeopardy!		Jeopardy! Masters	
Global	Fall	The Goldbergs (R)	ET	Survivor			Abbott Elementary	**Murder in a Small Town**	
Global	Winter	The Goldbergs (R)	ET	The Goldbergs (R)	Abbott Elementary	Raid the Cage		Elsbeth (R)	
Global	Mid-winter	The Goldbergs (R)	ET	**Hollywood Squares**	**Hollywood Squares**	The Goldbergs (R)	Abbott Elementary	Raid the Cage	
Global	Late winter	The Goldbergs (R)	ET	Survivor			Abbott Elementary	The Floor	
Global	Spring	The Goldbergs (R)	ET	Survivor			Abbott Elementary	The Floor	
Global	Summer	The Goldbergs (R)	ET	Survivor			Abbott Elementary	The Floor	

=== Thursday ===
Network		7:00 p.m.	7:30 p.m.	8:00 p.m.	8:30 p.m.	9:00 p.m.	9:30 p.m.	10:00 p.m.	10:30 p.m.
CBC	Fall	Coronation Street	Schitt's Creek (R)	Dragons' Den		My Mum, Your Dad		The National	
CBC	Winter	Coronation Street	Family Feud Canada	Dragons' Den		The Nature of Things		The National	
CBC	Late winter	Coronation Street	Family Feud Canada	Canada's Ultimate Challenge		The Nature of Things		The National	
CBC	Spring	Coronation Street	Family Feud Canada	Canada's Ultimate Challenge		Bollywed	Bollywed	The National	
CBC	Summer	Coronation Street	Family Feud Canada	Canada's Ultimate Challenge		Bollywed	Bollywed	The National	
Citytv	Fall	Family Feud (R)	Family Feud (R)	Law & Order		Law & Order: Special Victims Unit		Found	
Citytv	Winter	Found		Law & Order		Law & Order: Special Victims Unit		Law & Order Toronto: Criminal Intent	
Citytv	Spring	Found		Law & Order		Law & Order: Special Victims Unit		Law & Order Toronto: Criminal Intent	
Citytv	Summer	Found		Law & Order		Law & Order: Special Victims Unit		Law & Order Toronto: Criminal Intent	
CTV	Fall	Hell's Kitchen		**Georgie & Mandy's First Marriage**	Children Ruin Everything	**Doctor Odyssey**		Grey's Anatomy	
CTV	Winter	Etalk	**Georgie & Mandy's First Marriage**	Hell's Kitchen		**Scamanda**		Various programming	
CTV	Spring	Etalk	The Big Bang Theory (R)	**Georgie & Mandy's First Marriage**	**Happy's Place**	Doctor Odyssey		Grey's Anatomy	
CTV	Summer	Etalk	The Big Bang Theory (R)	**Georgie & Mandy's First Marriage**	**Happy's Place**	Doctor Odyssey		Grey's Anatomy	
CTV 2	Fall	The Big Bang Theory (R)	Thursday Night Football						
CTV 2	Winter	The Big Bang Theory (R)	Etalk	Next Level Chef		Criminal Minds (R)		Criminal Minds (R)	
CTV 2	Spring	The Big Bang Theory (R)	Etalk	Next Level Chef		Criminal Minds (R)		Criminal Minds (R)	
CTV 2	Summer	The Big Bang Theory (R)	Etalk	Next Level Chef		Criminal Minds (R)		Criminal Minds (R)	
Global	Fall	ET	Ghosts	9-1-1		**Matlock**		Elsbeth	
Global	Winter	The Goldbergs (R)	ET	The Goldbergs (R)	Ghosts	**Matlock**		Elsbeth	
Global	Spring	ET	Ghosts	9-1-1		**Matlock**		Elsbeth	
Global	Summer	ET	Ghosts	9-1-1		**Matlock**		Elsbeth	

=== Friday ===
Network		7:00 p.m.	7:30 p.m.	8:00 p.m.	8:30 p.m.	9:00 p.m.	9:30 p.m.	10:00 p.m.	10:30 p.m.
CBC	Fall	Coronation Street	Coronation Street	Marketplace	About That with Andrew Chang	The Fifth Estate		The National	
CBC	Winter	Coronation Street	Coronation Street	Marketplace	Stuff the British Stole	The Fifth Estate		The National	
CBC	Spring	Coronation Street	Coronation Street	Marketplace	Stuff the British Stole	The Fifth Estate		The National	
CBC	Summer	Coronation Street	Coronation Street	Marketplace	Stuff the British Stole	The Fifth Estate		The National	
Citytv	Fall	Family Feud (R)	Lopez vs Lopez	Let's Make a Deal (R)		Dateline NBC			
Citytv	Winter	Family Feud (R)	Lopez vs Lopez	Let's Make a Deal (R)		Dateline NBC			
Citytv	Spring	Family Feud (R)	Family Feud (R)	Grosse Pointe Garden Society		Dateline NBC			
Citytv	Summer	Family Feud (R)	Family Feud (R)	Grosse Pointe Garden Society		Dateline NBC			
CTV		Etalk	**Happy's Place**	Shark Tank		Crime Scene Kitchen		Blue Bloods	
CTV 2		The Big Bang Theory (R)	Etalk	CTV Movie					
Global	Fall	The Goldbergs (R)	ET	S.W.A.T.		Fire Country		Crime Beat	
Global	Winter	The Goldbergs (R)	ET	NCIS: Sydney		Fire Country		S.W.A.T.	
Global	Spring	The Goldbergs (R)	ET	NCIS: Sydney		Fire Country		S.W.A.T.	
Global	Summer	The Goldbergs (R)	ET	NCIS: Sydney		Fire Country		S.W.A.T.	

=== Saturday ===
Network		7:00 p.m.	7:30 p.m.	8:00 p.m.	8:30 p.m.	9:00 p.m.	9:30 p.m.	10:00 p.m.	10:30 p.m.
CBC		Hockey Night in Canada							
Citytv		Hockey Night in Canada						Hudson & Rex (R)	
CTV	Fall	CTV Movie						Children Ruin Everything (R)	Children Ruin Everything (R)
CTV	Winter	CTV Movie						Children Ruin Everything (R)	Children Ruin Everything (R)
CTV	Spring	CTV Movie						Children Ruin Everything (R)	Children Ruin Everything (R)
CTV	Summer	CFL on CTV						Children Ruin Everything (R)	Children Ruin Everything (R)
Global	Fall	Border Security: America's Front Line (R)	Border Security: America's Front Line (R)	Murder in a Small Town (R)		Private Eyes (R)		48 Hours	
Global	Winter	Border Security: America's Front Line (R)	Border Security: America's Front Line (R)	Family Law (R)		Ransom (R)		Crimebeat: Most Wanted (R)	Crimebeat: Most Wanted (R)
Global	Spring	Border Security: America's Front Line (R)	Border Security: America's Front Line (R)	Family Law (R)		Ransom (R)		Crimebeat: Most Wanted (R)	Crimebeat: Most Wanted (R)
Global	Summer	Border Security: America's Front Line (R)	Border Security: America's Front Line (R)	Family Law (R)		Ransom (R)		Crimebeat: Most Wanted (R)	Crimebeat: Most Wanted (R)

== By network ==
=== CBC ===
Returning series:

- 22 Minutes
- Animal Control
- Allegiance
- Bollywed
- Canada's Ultimate Challenge
- Dragon's Den
- Family Feud Canada
- The Fifth Estate
- The Great Canadian Baking Show
- Heartland
- Hockey Night in Canada
- The Legacy Awards
- Marketplace
- Murdoch Mysteries
- The National
- The Nature of Things
- The New Wave of Standup
- The Passionate Eye
- Plan B
- SkyMed
- Son of a Critch
- Still Standing
- Stuff the British Stole
- Wild Cards

New series:

- The Knowing
- Locals Welcome
- North of North
- Paid in Full: The Battle for Black Music
- Saint-Pierre
- Small Achievable Goals

Not returning from 2023–24:

- Bones of Crows
- Blackberry
- Moonshine
- One More Time
- Race Against the Tide
- Run the Burbs
- Sort Of
- Victoria

=== Citytv ===
Returning series:

- America's Got Talent
- American Idol
- The Bachelor
- Bachelor in Paradise (USA)
- Bachelor in Paradise Canada
- Bob's Burgers (shared with CHCH, on-demand with Star)
- Canada's Got Talent
- Chicago Fire
- Chicago Med
- Chicago P.D.
- Dateline NBC (Friday broadcasts only)
- Dancing with the Stars (shared with Disney+)
- Extreme Makeover: Home Edition (shared with Home Network)
- Family Guy (shared with CHCH, on-demand with Star)
- Found
- Grimsburg (shared with CHCH)
- Hockey Night in Canada
- Hudson & Rex
- The Irrational
- The Jennifer Hudson Show (late night)
- Jimmy Kimmel Live (late night)
- Krapopolis (shared with CHCH)
- Law & Order
- Law & Order Toronto: Criminal Intent
- Law & Order: Organized Crime
- Law & Order: Special Victims Unit
- Lopez vs Lopez
- The Simpsons (shared with CHCH, on-demand with Disney+)

New series:

- The Americas
- Brilliant Minds
- Going Dutch
- The Golden Bachelorette
- Grosse Pointe Garden Society
- Judy Justice (daytime)
- Trivial Pursuit
- The Hunting Party
- Universal Basic Guys
- Yes, Chef!

Not returning from 2023–24:

- Extended Family
- Hell's Kitchen (moved to CTV)

=== CTV/CTV 2 ===
Returning series

- The $100,000 Pyramid
- 9-1-1: Lone Star
- Alert: Missing Persons Unit
- The Amazing Race (USA)
- The Amazing Race Canada
- Battle of the Generations
- Blue Bloods
- Celebrity Jeopardy!
- Celebrity Wheel of Fortune
- CFL on CTV
- Children Ruin Everything
- The Cleaning Lady
- The Conners
- Etalk
- Grey's Anatomy
- Farming for Love
- Hell's Kitchen (moved from Citytv)
- Kitchen Nightmares
- Lego Masters
- The Masked Singer
- MasterChef Junior
- Monday Night Football
- Next Level Chef
- Night Court
- The Rookie
- Shark Tank
- Special Forces: World's Toughest Test
- Snake Oil
- Sullivan's Crossing
- Sunday Night Football
- Thursday Night Football
- Tracker
- The Voice
- Will Trent

New series:

- Doctor Odyssey
- Extracted
- Georgie and Mandy's First Marriage
- Happy's Place
- High Potential
- Mark McKinney Needs a Hobby
- Rescue: HI-Surf
- Shifting Gears
- St. Denis Medical
- Scamanda
- Suits LA
- The Summit

Not returning from 2023–24:

- Bob Hearts Abishola
- Farmer Wants a Wife
- The Good Doctor
- La Brea
- Magnum P.I.
- Not Dead Yet
- Station 19
- Transplant
- W5
- Young Sheldon

=== Global ===
Returning series:

- 48 Hours
- 60 Minutes
- 9-1-1
- Abbott Elementary
- Accused
- Big Brother
- Crime Beat
- The Equalizer
- ET
- Elsbeth
- The Floor
- Fire Country
- Family Law
- FBI
- FBI: International
- FBI: Most Wanted
- Ghosts
- I Can See Your Voice
- NCIS
- Raid the Cage
- Survivor
- S.W.A.T.

New series:

- Doc
- Hollywood Squares
- Matlock
- Murder in a Small Town
- NCIS: Origins
- Poppa's House
- The Snake
- Watson

Not returning from 2023–24:

- Big Brother Canada
- CSI: Vegas
- Departure
- ET Canada
- Lotería Loca
- NCIS: Hawai'i
- Robyn Hood
- So Help Me Todd

== Renewals and cancellations ==
=== Cancellations/series endings ===
==== CTV/CTV 2 ====
- Children Ruin Everything—It was announced on February 11, 2025 that season four would be the final season. The series concluded on February 27, 2025.

== See also ==
- 2024–25 United States network television schedule
