= The Summit (TV series) =

Australian reality television series

- Genre: Reality competition
- Presented by: Jai Courtney
- Country of origin: Australia
- Original language: English
- No. of seasons: 2
- No. of episodes: 21

Production
- Production locations: Mount Aspiring / Tititea, Southern Alps mountain range, South Island, New Zealand
- Running time: 90 min (with ads)
- Production company: Endemol Shine Australia

Original release
- Network: Nine Network
- Release: 14 May 2023 – 4 June 2024

Related
- The Summit (American TV series)

The Summit is an Australian reality television series which first premiered on 14 May 2023. The premise being that a group of contestants have to reach the top of a mountain, undertaking various tasks along the way. Each contestant has a backpack with a portion of the grand prize of A$1,000,000.

The series is produced by Nine Network and Endemol Shine Australia. Auditions for a second season opened in August 2023, with filming to take place over three weeks between November and December 2023. Season two premiered on Sunday, 12 May 2024. In October 2024, the series was not renewed and did not return for 2025.

== Format ==
Contestants must all inevitably work together to complete several tasks, within only fourteen days. They are initially strangers to each other. Where a contestant stops competing, the prize pot significantly reduces; similarly all the prize pot will disappear if the syndicate does not reach the summit in the allocated time.

The host of the series is Australian actor Jai Courtney.

=== Mountain's Keeper ===
The Mountain's Keeper will make appearances throughout the series; she keeps track of the trekkers' movements, is fully aware of the procedures necessary to reach the summit, and will be keeping an eye on the group at all times. The Keeper will occasionally instruct the gang to get rid of someone in order to advance.

=== Checkpoints ===
The team may stay in a sizeable campground and get a variety of amenities, including food, when the trekkers reach a checkpoint. The team must, however, vote one of its own team members off the mountain at the majority of checkpoints, with the evictee's money still in the game.

=== Endgame ===
Should the remaining team members make it to the summit, then the prize fund will be divided among the successful team members by the eliminated players. This was alluded to on the show with the saying “Be careful with who you meet on the way up, because you don't know who you'll see on the way down” as said by Jai on the start of their journey.

== Location ==
The series was filmed in the Southern Alps, South Island, New Zealand starting near Glenorchy at the northern tip of Lake Wakatipu. During the second episode a clear view of Mount Alfred can be seen during the climb up to the ridge overlooking the Rees River. The destination summit is Mount Head with several episodes were shot on Rees Valley and The Branches high-country stations in the province of Otago, north of Glenorchy. Lake scenes were shot at Lochnagar, headwaters of the Shotover River. Both locations are on private or leasehold land. The series places emphasis on the sociological aspects of competition and reward, as the group works together to complete the arduous task of climbing the mountain, while also having to work against each other out of self-preservation.

== Series details ==
Season	Episodes	No. of contestants	Originally aired		Result			
Season	Episodes	No. of contestants	Season premiere	Season finale	Remaining contestants at Summit	Initial Prize	Remaining Prize	Decision?
1	10	14	14 May 2023	4 June 2023	3	$1 million	$490k	Unequally split
2	11	15	12 May 2024	4 June 2024	3	$1 million	$536k	Unequally split

== Season 1 (2023) ==
=== Contestants ===
Name	Age	State	Occupation	Status	Reason for exit
Isaac Compton	36	NSW	Musician	Day 14	Completed
Brooke Kilowsky	38	SA	Parent	Day 14	Completed
Lulu Hawton	38	WA	Boxer	Day 14	Completed
Jans Andre	28	Qld	Entrepreneur	Day 14	Lulu chose to eliminate
Alex Silvagni	35	WA	Former AFL player	Day 13	Eliminated at checkpoint
Indy Thompson	23	Tas	Marine scientist	Day 13	Lulu chose to eliminate
Josh Waldhorn	52	Vic	Graphic designer	Day 11	Majority group voted to eliminate
Sam Molineaux	28	NSW	Personal trainer	Day 8	Eliminated at checkpoint
Phillip Kuoch	29	Vic	Doughnut bakery owner	Day 8	Eliminated in challenge by sacrifice
Annikki Chand	27	Qld	Dance teacher	Day 7	Eliminated at checkpoint
Jacqui Cooper	50	Vic	Olympic aerial skier	Day 6	Brooke chose to eliminate
Gemma Mullins	29	Vic	Health coach	Day 5	Eliminated at checkpoint
Catherine "Kitty" Connor	60	NT	Outback registered nurse	Day 3	Withdrew voluntarily
Stephen Butler	34	Qld	Sock designer	Day 2	Majority group voted to eliminate

==== Elimination ====
Colour key:
– Completed The Summit and received a share of the prize
– Eliminated and lost the money
– Withdrew from the competition and lost the money
– Eliminated at a checkpoint and money was stolen
– Eliminated at a checkpoint, money was stolen, but stole from the cash pot
– Trekker had immunity
– Given Power to Eliminate (PE) a Trekker

Name	Days in													
Name	1	2	3	4	5	6	7	8	9	10	11	12	13	14
Isaac														Completed $250k
Brooke						PE								Completed $150k
Lulu													PE	Completed $90k
Lulu													PE	PE
Jans														Eliminated -$71.5k
Alex													Eliminated	—N/a
Indy													Eliminated -$71.5k	—N/a
Josh											Eliminated -$71.5k	—N/a		
Sam					Immunity			Eliminated; Stole $10k	—N/a					
Phillip								Eliminated -$71.5k	—N/a					
Annikki							Eliminated	—N/a						
Jacqui						Eliminated -$71.5k	—N/a							
Gemma					Eliminated	—N/a								
Catherine			Withdrew -$71.5k	—N/a										
Stephen		Eliminated -$71.5k	—N/a											
Prize	$1m	$928.5k	$857k			$785.5k		$704k			$632k		$560.5k	$490k

=== Episodes ===
No. overall	No. in season	Title	Original release date	AUS viewers
1	1	"Days 1–2"	14 May 2023	401,000
The 14 trekkers meet for the first time and each receive a backpack with $71,430 inside (equivalent to $1 million all together), they are given 14 days to reach the top of the mountain. Nevertheless, by the end of the episode, all contestants are seen walking along the floor of the Rees Valley, having not gained any altitude. During the first challenge to cross a (staged) rickety bridge, a helicopter appears which turns out to be the Mountain's Keeper. The Keeper dispenses a letter that tells half the group who have crossed the bridge they must eliminate one trekker on the other side. Stephen is voted out in majority rules and as he crosses the bridge it is cut by Isaac, leaving Stephen behind. This reduces the prize money to $930,000.
2	2	"Days 3–5"	15 May 2023	400,000
Now down to 13 trekkers, some of the trekkers aren't happy with Kitty as she is slow and unable to keep up. At a pit stop (Twenty Five Mile Creek, Rees Valley), the group put it to her she should quit. She agrees she struggles and decides to leave the mountain and cut the prize down to $857,000. The trekkers continue, and the Mountain's Keeper drops a package at the bottom of the mountain where Sam, Gemma and Jans volunteer to grab it. Inside the package are some treats and a note. The note instructs that the one who carries the package back to the group before night will receive immunity. Sam withholds this information from the other trekkers. At the next checkpoint, before choosing to eliminate someone, host Jai tells the trekkers Sam has immunity.
3	3	"Day 6"	16 May 2023	428,000
Still on day 5, the trekkers must now vote someone out after finding out Sam has immunity. Since they're not allowed to vote out Sam and feeling deceived by Gemma, all trekkers vote her out. On Day 6, there are 131 kilometres (81 mi) till the trekkers reach the summit and $857,000 in prize money remaining. The Mountain's Keeper drops a yellow package which Brooke races towards. The package says one of the trekkers has the power to vote someone off immediately; however the money goes too. Brooke has the choice to use the power or pass it to someone else. She uses the power and eliminates Jacqui and cuts the prize down to $785,500.
4	4	"Day 7"	21 May 2023	441,000
It's the half way point as Day 7 arrives. The first obstacle of the day is to cross two suspended ropes. Everyone makes it but as Jans (the last to cross) begins moving along, the Mountain's Keeper arrives. Jans begins to agitate the Keeper, which stresses out the other trekkers thinking there will be consequences. The second obstacle is abseiled down a cliff-face waterfall which all trekkers do, but Isaac has a fear of heights and begins to pull out. After a pep talk from Alex, he abseils down and threatens to quit. They arrive at the checkpoint and it's time to eliminate a trekker. Some believe Isaac should go, and some want Annikki to go. In the end seven trekkers vote for Annikki to leave.
5	5	"Day 8"	22 May 2023	386,000
It's Day 8 and thanks to Jans' taunting, the Mountain's Keeper challenges the trekkers to a 1 kilometre (0.62 mi) sprint with their money on their backs on uneven terrain. Isaac and Philip are the last to cross, however Philip sacrifices himself and is eliminated and loses his money. The remaining trekkers make it to the second last checkpoint (at Lochnagar, Shotover River), where they're told they now must travel by kayak as the terrain is too harsh (which is not actually true because in reality Lochnagar is a popular location for trekkers and easily negotiable on foot). Before they can vote someone off, they must retrieve a second set of kayaks as there are not enough. Jans, Sam, Josh and Indy retrieve the kayaks, while the others remain on shore. The Mountain's Keeper, however, drops a bag into the lake where Alex swims in to grab it. Inside it says whichever team Alex was on are immune and have control over who gets eliminated on the other team at checkpoint.
6	6	"Day 9"	23 May 2023	395,000
Still on Day 8, Alex and his team must now vote a trekker off. Sam is eliminated and has his money taken in a unanimous decision, but the Mountain's Keeper gives him one last task: he can take $10,000 from the prize fund if he can successfully steal the bag containing more than $200,000 in stolen money, leave it on the shore, and vanish. Sam completes this task successfully and is awarded the $10,000. On Day 9, the travellers discover the money has vanished and learn that the Mountain's Keeper has dumped it in the middle of a lake (Lochnagar). They dive in together to grab the bag and open it to receive the money, minus $10,000. As they continue, Jans becomes concerned about being exposed now that Sam is gone and devises a strategy to attempt to become friends with everyone. But, not everyone thinks it's sincere.
7	7	"Days 10–11"	28 May 2023	448,000
The group face a near vertical 200 metres (660 ft) rock climb and as the only trekker with mountaineering experience, Josh leads the group on the task. Ironically Josh is the one who struggles most on the nine-hour challenge and some start to view Josh as the weakest link – however, they all make it. Moving forward, the Mountain's Keeper drops a package, opened by Isaac, inside a note says the first to the helicopter will receive an automatic seat to the next stage. As there are only six seats but seven trekkers, the group must then vote out one trekker, and all but Indy vote out Josh. In a twist, the already-eliminated trekkers return and now hold the power of how the money will be shared between the remaining trekkers who reach the summit.
8	8	"Days 12–13"	29 May 2023	421,000
It's Day 12, and it seems the trekkers are on track to make it to the summit, however, a radio message from a safety officer tells them the conditions are too harsh and they must return the previous campsite for safety. On Day 13, they get the go ahead and on their way they receive a letter from the Mountain's Keeper stating the only way to get to the next stage is to fly at the end of the long line hanging underneath a chopper. Lulu goes first and is met with another note stating to move forward one trekker must be eliminated. Lulu calls over Isaac, Brooke and Alex and she decides whether Jans or Indy must go, however since Jans is carrying the stolen money, she choose to eliminate Indy with the support of Isaac, Brooke and Alex. As the remaining trekkers continue, the Mountain's Keeper lets them each call a loved one at home. The five remaining trekkers make it to the last checkpoint where yet again they must vote someone out
9	9	"Days 13–14"	30 May 2023	413,000
Still on day 13, the trekkers must now vote someone out. Jans believes because Alex was a former AFL player he already has money, however some feel Jans should go, ultimately three trekkers vote for Alex who must leave and money stolen. On Day 14, the four remaining face a harsh challenge to hang upside down on a single rope drag themselves across the 30-metre gap. Although afraid and backs out at first, Isaac eventually crosses with the rest of them. Continuing on, the Mountains Keeper drops the last package which Lulu reaches first. Upon opening and reading the letter, Lulu bursts into tears and exclaims "Oh my god guys".
10	10	"Day 14"	4 June 2023	462,000 / 487,000
Still on Day 14, the package read that Lulu must vote out one person, she chose Jans. Moving on, Isaac, Lulu and Brooke reach the summit where they're met by the eliminated trekkers who decide how the prize of $490,000 will be split. Each trekker give their reasons why they deserve the money. In the end, the money was split, however, not equally. Lulu received $90,000, Brooke received $150,000 and Isaac received $250,000; more than half the prize money.

== Season 2 (2024) ==
=== Contestants ===
Name	Age	State	Occupation	Status	Reason for exit
Charlotte Shelton	35	NSW	Nurse/Midwife	Day 15	Completed
Mat Rogers	48	Qld	Former NRL player	Day 15	Completed
Simmone Jade Mackinnon	51	NSW	Business owner/Actress	Day 15	Completed
Trisha Lindgren	43	SA	Personal trainer	Day 14	Mat chose to eliminate
Taylor Reid	28	Vic	Stevedore	Day 13	Eliminated at checkpoint
Tiffani Wood	46	NSW	Singer	Day 12	Majority group voted to eliminate
Sam Molineaux	29	NSW	Personal trainer/Season 1 Climber	Day 11	Eliminated at checkpoint
Ava Kazemi	29	LA/WA	Aerospace engineer	Day 11	Majority group voted to eliminate
Phil Britten	43	WA	Martial artist/Motivations speaker	Day 10	Sam's choice to replace
Olympia Valance	31	Vic	Actress	Day 7	Eliminated at checkpoint
Lochie Dornauf	31	Tas	Farmer/councillor	Day 6	Eliminated at checkpoint
Glen "Sharkesy" Parkes	30	Qld	Unprofessional poker player	Day 5	Withdrew due to believing the game is rigged
Roslyn "Ros" Buerckner	41	Qld	Horse trainer/farmer	Day 4	Eliminated at checkpoint
Theo Zaharopoulos	49	Vic	Stay-at-home dad	Day 3	Withdrew for medical reasons
David Cotgreave	59	WA	Technical director	Day 2	Majority group voted to eliminate

==== Elimination ====
Colour key:
– Completed The Summit and received a share of the prize
– Eliminated and lost the money
– Withdrew from the competition and lost the money
– Eliminated at a checkpoint and money was stolen
– Eliminated by The Chaser and money was stolen
– The Chaser entered the competition

Name	Days in														
Name	1	2	3	4	5	6	7	8	9	10	11	12	13	14	15
Charlotte															Completed $336k
Mat															Completed $100k
Simmone															Completed $100k
Trisha														Eliminated -$53.5k	—N/a
Taylor													Eliminated	—N/a	
Tiffani												Eliminated -$53.5k	—N/a		
Sam							In				Eliminated	—N/a			
Ava											Eliminated -$53.5k	—N/a			
Phil										Eliminated	—N/a				
Olympia							Eliminated	—N/a							
Lochie						Eliminated	—N/a								
Sharkesy					Withdrew -$53.5k	—N/a									
Ros				Eliminated	—N/a										
Theo			Withdrew -$53.5k	—N/a											
David		Eliminated -$53.5k	—N/a												
Group	Lost $270k	Gained $250k	Lost $4k	—N/a			Lost $50K	Lost $100K; Gained $80K	—N/a				Lost $50k	—N/a	
Prize	$1m/ 750k	$925.5k	$869k		$815.5k		$765.5	$746.5			$693k	$639.5k	$589.5k	$536k	

=== Episodes ===
No. overall	No. in season	Title	Original release date	AUS viewers
11	1	"Days 1–2"	12 May 2024	583,000
As the 14 new trekkers arrive, they are immediately told by host Jai $250k is missing from the kitty. The money is waiting on the mountain and to obtain it they had must make it up a 50-metre sheer cliff face via a wooden ladder and rickety swing bridge in just 60 minutes. Unfortunately the money is dropped from the sky after David took to long to cross. On day 2, David has hurt his toe and the group receive a package which says as a group vote someone out, they lose that part of the money but will receive the $250k, most votes go to David who is eliminated but they lose his share. At the first checkpoint, Jai tells the group one of them must carry the money, in which they can keep it or put it back once reached the top. Phil is voted most to carry the money.
12	2	"Days 3–4"	13 May 2024	504,000
It's day 3 and the trekkers move on to reach the next checkpoint. Along the way, temptation arrives, a cup of coffee but it takes $1k from the kitty. Despite this four trekkers buy a cup which takes $4k from the total prize. Moving forward, the trekkers must scale the steepest part of the trek so far, a 3,000 foot uphill slog through dense rain forest. Along the way, Theo feels pain he had since he's awaken, and in doctors orders must leave the competition including his share. The trekkers reach the checkpoint and must eliminate one person, they all avoid Phil as he carries the $250k, in the end Ros unanimously receives the votes and is eliminated with her money taken into the share.
13	3	"Day 5"	14 May 2024	523,000
It's day 5 and Jai tells the audience that Sam, from season 1, is the chaser, he is 4 days behind on the trekkers but if he catches up he can steal one of the trekkers share of the money. Moving on, the trekkers must make it across a river by balancing in pairs along two tightropes high above it while holding each other, during which simmone hurts her hand, despite this they make it to the next checkpoint. Sharkesy, however, pulls a producer to the side and claims the game is “rigged” after failing to cross the ravine, and decides to withdraw from the competition, which also removes his share from the prize money.
14	4	"Day 6"	20 May 2024	N/A
The trekkers wake up on day 6 and find out about The Chaser, Sam, who is only 20km behind the group. Moving forward, the trekkers must hang upside down and cross a rope dangling above the water completely solo. Olympia loses her handle and falls after two Mountain's Keeper choppers arrive. At the next checkpoint, Jai reveals both choppers have a duffle bag, one black one red, the trekkers split into two teams and go after a bag each, one bag keeping the trekkers safe from elimination, the other meaning you can be eliminated immediately. Mats team, consisting of Taylor, Phil, Trisha and Ava, chose the safety bag and decide to vote off Lochie and steal his money.
15	5	"Day 7"	21 May 2024	N/A
As Day 7 arrives, the mountain keeper appears with a mysterious yellow bag. Mat, Olympia & Ava reach the bag which says there is two choppers at the end of the mountain, and you don't want to be the last three to arrive. Olympia & Mat keep this information private, but Ava tells her allies. The last three to arrive are Mat, Charlotte & Olympia who are told they're the only ones who can be eliminated at the next checkpoint. In the end, Olympia is voted out and her money stolen. Jai tells the remaining tellers the chaser is close and will send them to the next checkpoint to further ahead, however this cost them $50k. Upon arrival at the checkpoint, the Mountain's Keeper drops another yellow bag, which inside says “look behind you”, there the trekkers see The Chaser, Sam, had caught up with them.
16	6	"Days 7–8"	22 May 2024	N/A
Still on Day 7 arrives, the trekkers are surprised by Sam's arrival. As Sam tries to make the peace, Mat isn't buying into it and keeps an eye on him. Its day 8, and the trekkers must traverse across a rope suspended very high on the mountain, however if you fall, they lose $20K from the cash pot, unfortunately five trekkers fall and they lose $100K. After being evacuated to an emergency camp site, the Mountain's Keeper arrives and drops two more duffle bags, one red one black, as a team they must decide which bag to keep, they keep red. One bag will give them back $80K of the $100K they lost, the other bag will take another $20K. Taylor opens the bag…they receive $80K.
17	7	"Day 9–10"	27 May 2024	N/A
Now Day 9, Sam begins to strategise who to take the money from and take their place. Phil decides to tell Sam about the $250k his carrying to save his own skin from elimination, seems like the good choice, right? The trekkers arrive at the next checkpoint and plead their cases to Sam of why they should stay, in the end it dosent matter because surprise surprise, Sam chooses Phil to eliminate, takes his place and the $230k. Unfortunately for Sam, he now has a target on his back especially from Mat, not happy jan!
18	8	"Day 11"	28 May 2024	N/A
As Day 11 arrives, the trekkers are still mad at Sam for eliminating Phil. Moving forward the trekkers scale across a waterfall, however when the Mountain's Keeper arrives and drops a duffle bag, the game yet again changes. Sam and Taylor reach it first which says “last one to finish this challenge is cut and money lost”, the trekkers strategically and make sure Ava is last…which she is and receives a letter from the Mountain's Keeper saying everyone voted to eliminate her. The remaining trekkers make it to the second last checkpoint. They must vote off another trekker, which of course is…Sam.
19	9	"Days 12–13"	28 May 2024	N/A
It's day 12 and the climb up the mountain is getting harder, so the Mountain's Keeper allows each of the to talk to a loved one via facetime. Moving forward, the Mountain's Keeper drops a yellow duffel, Mat reaches it first which contains food and a letter, which says “they must leave a trekker behind with their cash during the night”, collectively they vote for Tiffani who doesn't know. In the early hours of Day 13, the trekkers sneak out and leave Tiffani behind, who in the morning finds the camp empty and a kind note left by the remaining trekkers.
20	10	"Days 13–14"	3 June 2024	N/A
It's still day 13 and the five remaining trekkers move forward and reach their next obstacle, zipline that will require them to swing 100 metres across two mountains. However, if a trekker falls they lose $50k each time. Trish goes first with the worst rope and of course falls off, losing them $50k. Thankfully the remaining trekkers make it across safely. The trekkers reach their final checkpoint where another climber must be voted off, and thanks to a strategic vote Taylor is eliminated and his money lost. It's day 14 and the trekkers make their final leap to The Summit. Finally after many gruelling days the reach The Summit…or so they think. Jai contacts the trekkers and tells them their on the wrong mountain, a red flare goes up to which Jai is standing, the trekkers must now make it to that mountain in less than 24 hours or the money will be completely lost.
21	11	"Days 14–15"	4 June 2024	665,000
Still Day 14, and the remaining trekkers start moving quickly to the “real” summit. The final four reach a road block at a deep crevice in the ice, and the only way across is via two very wobbly ladders. Mat successfully crosses and finds another hidden note which reveals the last trekker to cross must be eliminated. Unfortunately, Trish is last and almost crosses before Mat says “sorry” and let's go of the ladder, immediately eliminating her. It's now day 15 and the final day, and the remaining trekkers reach the “real” summit. The eliminated trekkers return to decide how to split the winnings…however in one last trick, the Mountains Keeper reveals a duffel bag which is opened by Charlotte, she gets the power to split the money, which surprises the eliminated trekkers. After deliberation, Charlotte gives Mat & Simmone $100k each, leaving herself with $336k, the biggest take in The Summit history.

== International versions ==
=== American version ===
An American version aired on CBS from September to December 2024 with New Zealand actor Manu Bennett as host. However, it was cancelled on April 22, 2025, after one season.

=== Other versions ===
In July 2024, it was reported that a British version had been commissioned by ITV. In November, Ben Shephard was confirmed as host of the series with filming taking place in New Zealand's South Island; it was initially expected to be aired in 2025, but was delayed until early 2026. This version features a top prize of £200,000. The series was cancelled after one season due to low viewership.

A Finnish version, The Summit Suomi, started airing on MTV3 in January 2025. It features 14 contestants climbing Stetinden in Norway for the maximum prize of €150,000. A Norwegian version, Vokteren, was commissioned by TV 2 that featured 14 contestants climbing Stetinden. A Swedish version, Berget, was commissioned by TV4; however, production was cancelled after a contestant died. A German edition was greenlit by Prime Video to be filmed in New Zealand, however will feature German celebrities.

== See also ==
Similar shows

- Australian Survivor
- The Bridge
