= Crime Scene Kitchen =

American reality TV series (2021– )

- Genre: Reality competition; Cookery
- Directed by: Paul Starkman (season 1); Ashley S. Gorman (season 2); Harbinder Singh (season 3)
- Presented by: Joel McHale
- Judges: Yolanda Gampp; Curtis Stone
- Country of origin: United States
- Original language: English
- No. of seasons: 3
- No. of episodes: 29

Production
- Executive producers: Allison Grodner; Rich Meehan; Conrad Green; Joel McHale; John Brunton (season 3-present)
- Production locations: Los Angeles (season 1); Atlanta (season 2); Toronto (season 3)
- Camera setup: Multi-camera
- Production companies: Fly on the Wall Entertainment; Insight Productions (season 3-present); Fox Alternative Entertainment (Note: Credited as Fox Entertainment for first season)

Original release
- Network: Fox
- Release: May 26, 2021 – present

Crime Scene Kitchen is an American reality television series that premiered on Fox on May 26, 2021. The series is hosted by Joel McHale with Yolanda Gampp and Curtis Stone serving as judges.

In May 2022, the series was renewed for a second season, which premiered in June 2023. In March 2024, the series was renewed for a third season, which premiered on September 26, 2024. In November 2024, Fox announced the series would be renewed for a fourth season. A casting call was issued in December 2025, but no launch date has been announced yet.

== Format ==
In each episode, teams of two bakers are tasked with deducing the type of dessert that was prepared in a kitchen by inspecting the state of its tools, food remnants, and other evidence such as written clues. Each team re-creates the dessert they identified, from scratch. The judges evaluate each team's dish based primarily on accuracy in identification, while taste and execution are considered as secondary factors.

Each episode consists of two rounds. The first round is the "Safety Bake" in which the winners are exempt from the second round and safe from elimination. In the first season, the first round was called the "Dessert Round", and the winners instead received an extra hint during the second round. The second round is called the "Elimination Bake" or the "Showpiece Round" in the first season. The worst-performing team in the second round is eliminated from the competition.

Each season features twelve teams, initially divided into two groups of six. In the second season, the groupings were based on the bakers' backgrounds, pitting self-taught bakers against those who are classically trained. Each of the first six episodes of each season features only one group, alternating until three teams have been eliminated from each group. Thereafter, the six teams remaining compete simultaneously. Thus, no more than six teams compete at once.

== Production ==
On April 7, 2021, it was announced that Fox had ordered Crime Scene Kitchen, with Joel McHale as host, who also serves as an executive producer. Yolanda Gampp and Curtis Stone serve as judges for the series. The series premiered on May 26, 2021.

On May 16, 2022, it was announced that the series had been renewed for a second season, which premiered on June 5, 2023, after originally being planned to premiere on May 22, 2023. In March 2024, the series was renewed for a third season, which premiered on September 26.

On November 23, 2024, it was announced that the series had been renewed for a fourth season, with Joel McHale set to return as host. On May 27, 2025, TVLine confirmed that the season was in development, although Fox had not yet scheduled a premiere date. In December 2025, a casting call for the fourth season began.

== Elimination tables ==
=== Season 1 ===
| Team | Relation | Episodes | | | | | | | | |
| Team | Relation | 1 | 2 | 3 | 4 | 5 | 6 | 7 | 8 | 9 |
| Team | Relation | Group A | Group B | A | B | A | B | 7 | 8 | 9 |
|---|---|---|---|---|---|---|---|---|---|---|
| Luis & Natalie | Friends | SAFE | | WIN^{†} | | SAFE | | SAFE | SAFE^{†} | WINNERS |
| Cathy & Thomas | Mother & son | WIN^{†} | | SAFE | | SAFE | | RISK^{†} | WIN | RUNNERS-UP |
| Lorie & Jason | Husband & wife | | SAFE^{†} | | SAFE | | SAFE | WIN | SAFE | RUNNERS-UP |
| Leslie & Emma | Mother & daughter | | WIN | | SAFE | | SAFE^{†} | SAFE | RISK | ELIM |
| Erinn & Amanda | Military veterans | SAFE | | SAFE | | RISK^{†} | | SAFE | ELIM | |
| Cory & Donte | Best friends | | SAFE | | SAFE | | RISK | ELIM | | |
| Shania & Hope | Best friends | | SAFE | | WIN | | ELIM | | | |
| Jay & Thuy-Linh | Culinary school friends | RISK | | SAFE | | ELIM | | | | |
| Rebecca & Jean | Mother & daughter | | RISK | | ELIM | | | | | |
| Carolyn & Caroline | Mother & daughter | SAFE | | ELIM | | | | | | |
| Natasha & Anthony | Friends | | ELIM | | | | | | | |
| Nathan & Anthony | Best friends | ELIM | | | | | | | | |

^{†}The team won the first round and received an extra hint for the Showpiece Round.

The team won Crime Scene Kitchen.
The team was a runner-up.
The team won the Showpiece Round.
The team was safe from elimination.
The team was at risk of elimination after the Showpiece Round.
The team lost the Showpiece Round and was eliminated from the competition.
The team did not compete in the episode.

=== Season 2 ===
| Team | Relation | Episodes | | | | | | | | | |
| Team | Relation | 1 | 2 | 3 | 4 | 5 | 6 | 7 | 8 | 9 | 10 |
| Team | Relation | ST (Note: Bakers in this group are self-taught) | CT (Note: Bakers in this group are classically-trained) | ST | CT | ST | CT | 7 | 8 | 9 | 10 |
|---|---|---|---|---|---|---|---|---|---|---|---|
| Amber & Yassmeen | Friends | | SAFE | | WIN | | SAFE | SAFE | WIN | SAFE | WINNERS |
| Laissa & Camille | Friends | | WIN | | SAFE | | SAFE | SAFE | SAFE | WIN | RUNNERS-UP |
| T & Fadi | Friends | SAFE | | SAFE | | SAFE | | WIN | SAFE | SAFE | RUNNERS-UP |
| Kristy & Tarsha | Mother & daughter | SAFE | | SAFE | | SAFE | | SAFE | SAFE | ELIM | |
| Steph & Cherry | Friends | WIN | | WIN | | WIN | | SAFE | ELIM | | |
| Sherry & Sally | Twin sisters | | SAFE | | SAFE | | WIN | ELIM | | | |
| Ricky & DJ | Friends | | SAFE | | SAFE | | ELIM | | | | |
| Kathleen & Hannah | Friends | SAFE | | SAFE | | ELIM | | | | | |
| Bob & Vikki | Husband & wife | | SAFE | | ELIM | | | | | | |
| Torre & Michelle | Husband & wife | SAFE | | ELIM | | | | | | | |
| Christina & Jen | Friends | | ELIM | | | | | | | | |
| Donovan & Dayveon | Stepbrothers | ELIM | | | | | | | | | |

The team won Crime Scene Kitchen.
The team was a runner-up.
The team won the Safety Bake and was safe from elimination.
The team was safe from elimination.
The team lost the Elimination Bake and was eliminated from the competition.
The team did not compete in the episode.

=== Season 3 ===
| Team | Relation | Episodes | | | | | | | | | |
| Team | Relation | 1 | 2 | 3 | 4 | 5 | 6 | 7 | 8 | 9 | 10 |
| Team | Relation | FA (Note: Bakers in this group are family) | FR (Note: Bakers in this group are friends) | FA | FR | FA | FR | 7 | 8 | 9 | 10 |
|---|---|---|---|---|---|---|---|---|---|---|---|
| Jessica & Lenore | Friends | | SAFE | | SAFE | | SAFE | SAFE | SAFE | WIN | WINNERS |
| Becky & Daniel | Siblings | SAFE | | WIN | | SAFE | | WIN | SAFE | SAFE | RUNNERS-UP |
| Janusz & Keiron | Friends | | SAFE | | WIN | | WIN | SAFE | SAFE | SAFE | RUNNERS-UP |
| Katelyn & Ronan | Spouses | WIN | | SAFE | | SAFE | | SAFE | WIN | ELIM | |
| Jesse & Justin | Brothers-in-law | | WIN | | SAFE | | SAFE | SAFE | ELIM | | |
| Starlett & Kai | Mother & daughter | SAFE | | SAFE | | WIN | | ELIM | | | |
| April & Samantha | Co-workers | | SAFE | | SAFE | | ELIM | | | | |
| Courtney & Danielle | Niece & uncle | SAFE | | SAFE | | ELIM | | | | | |
| Brando & Nikki | Friends | | SAFE | | ELIM | | | | | | |
| Anyatta & Sonjii | Sisters | SAFE | | ELIM | | | | | | | |
| Cliff & Adam | Friends | | ELIM | | | | | | | | |
| Nigel & Karen | Mother & son | ELIM | | | | | | | | | |

The team won Crime Scene Kitchen.
The team was a runner-up.
The team won the Safety Bake and was safe from elimination.
The team was safe from elimination.
The team lost the Elimination Bake and was eliminated from the competition.
The team did not compete in the episode.

== Episodes ==
=== Series overview ===
| Season | Episodes | Originally released | |
| Season | Episodes | First released | Last released |
|---|---|---|---|
| 1 | 9 | May 26, 2021 | July 21, 2021 |
| 2 | 10 | June 5, 2023 | August 14, 2023 |
| 3 | 10 | September 26, 2024 | December 5, 2024 |

=== Season 1 (2021) ===
| No. overall | No. in season | Title | Guest Judge | Original release date | Prod. code | U.S. viewers (millions) |
|---|---|---|---|---|---|---|
| 1 | 1 | "Premiere" | N/A | May 26, 2021 | CSK-101 | 2.35 |
| 2 | 2 | "Meet the Competition" | N/A | June 2, 2021 | CSK-102 | 1.89 |
| 3 | 3 | "Just Desserts" | Cheryl Hines | June 9, 2021 | CSK-103 | 1.74 |
| 4 | 4 | "Decisions, Decisions" | N/A | June 16, 2021 | CSK-104 | 1.63 |
| 5 | 5 | "Rock and Roll" | Kelly Osbourne | June 23, 2021 | CSK-105 | 1.83 |
| 6 | 6 | "Red, White and Clue" | Aarón Sanchez | June 30, 2021 | CSK-106 | 1.86 |
| 7 | 7 | "The Rise and Fall" | N/A | July 7, 2021 | CSK-107 | 1.89 |
| 8 | 8 | "Fight Until the Batter End" | Ken Jeong | July 14, 2021 | CSK-108 | 1.83 |
| 9 | 9 | "Finale" | N/A | July 21, 2021 | CSK-109 | 1.63 |

=== Season 2 (2023) ===
| No. overall | No. in season | Title | Guest Judge | Original release date | Prod. code | U.S. viewers (millions) |
|---|---|---|---|---|---|---|
| 10 | 1 | "Premiere: Welcome Self-Taught Bakers" | N/A | June 5, 2023 | CSK-201 | 1.17 |
| 11 | 2 | "Meet the Classically-Trained Competition" | N/A | June 12, 2023 | CSK-202 | 1.02 |
| 12 | 3 | "Self-Taught: Not So Simple" | N/A | June 19, 2023 | CSK-203 | 1.00 |
| 13 | 4 | "Classically-Trained: Going Plum Crazy" | N/A | June 26, 2023 | CSK-204 | 1.09 |
| 14 | 5 | "Self-Taught: Follow the Clues" | NeNe Leakes | July 10, 2023 | CSK-205 | 1.04 |
| 15 | 6 | "Classically-Trained: Easy as Pie" | N/A | July 17, 2023 | CSK-206 | 1.16 |
| 16 | 7 | "The Merge: A Total Crêpe Shoot" | Martina McBride | July 24, 2023 | CSK-207 | 1.15 |
| 17 | 8 | "The Quarterfinals: A Sticky Situation" | Richard Blais | July 31, 2023 | CSK-208 | 1.20 |
| 18 | 9 | "The Semifinals: It's All in the Details" | Dwight Howard | August 7, 2023 | CSK-209 | 1.03 |
| 19 | 10 | "The Finale: I Need a Drink!" | N/A | August 14, 2023 | CSK-210 | 1.01 |

=== Season 3 (2024) ===
| No. overall | No. in season | Title | Guest Judge | Original release date | Prod. code | U.S. viewers (millions) |
|---|---|---|---|---|---|---|
| 20 | 1 | "Premiere: It's A Family Affair" | N/A | September 26, 2024 | CSK-302 | 1.06 |
| 21 | 2 | "The One with the Friends" | N/A | October 3, 2024 | CSK-301 | 1.12 |
| 22 | 3 | "Keep Your Family Close, and Your Pans Closer" | N/A | October 10, 2024 | CSK-304 | 0.95 |
| 23 | 4 | "The Proof Is in the Mousse" | N/A | October 17, 2024 | CSK-303 | 1.05 |
| 24 | 5 | "Let's Get Ready to Ravi" | Ravi Patel | October 24, 2024 | CSK-306 | 1.00 |
| 25 | 6 | "Fruit, Flowers and Friends" | N/A | October 31, 2024 | CSK-305 | 1.09 |
| 26 | 7 | "The Merge" | N/A | November 7, 2024 | CSK-307 | 0.98 |
| 27 | 8 | "The Quarterfinals" | Dominique Ansel | November 14, 2024 | CSK-308 | 1.11 |
| 28 | 9 | "The Semifinals" | N/A | November 21, 2024 | CSK-309 | 1.07 |
| 29 | 10 | "The Finale" | N/A | December 5, 2024 | CSK-310 | 1.04 |

== Reception ==
=== Season 1 ===
Viewership and ratings per episode of Crime Scene Kitchen
| No. | Title | Air date | Rating/share (18–49) | Viewers (millions) | DVR (18–49) | DVR viewers (millions) | Total (18–49) | Total viewers (millions) | Ref. |
|---|---|---|---|---|---|---|---|---|---|
| 1 | "Premiere" | May 26, 2021 | 0.6/4 | 2.35 | 0.2 | 0.83 | 0.9 | 3.18 | |
| 2 | "Meet the Competition" | June 2, 2021 | 0.5/3 | 1.89 | 0.1 | 0.54 | 0.6 | 2.43 | |
| 3 | "Just Desserts" | June 9, 2021 | 0.5/3 | 1.74 | 0.2 | 0.66 | 0.6 | 2.40 | |
| 4 | "Decisions, Decisions" | June 16, 2021 | 0.4/3 | 1.63 | 0.1 | 0.60 | 0.5 | 2.22 | |
| 5 | "Rock and Roll" | June 23, 2021 | 0.5/3 | 1.83 | 0.1 | 0.59 | 0.6 | 2.42 | |
| 6 | "Red, White and Clue" | June 30, 2021 | 0.5/3 | 1.86 | 0.1 | 0.63 | 0.6 | 2.48 | |
| 7 | "The Rise and Fall" | July 7, 2021 | 0.5/3 | 1.89 | 0.2 | 0.70 | 0.6 | 2.58 | |
| 8 | "Fight Until the Batter End" | July 14, 2021 | 0.4/3 | 1.83 | 0.2 | 0.71 | 0.6 | 2.54 | |
| 9 | "Finale" | July 21, 2021 | 0.4/3 | 1.63 | 0.2 | 0.72 | 0.5 | 2.35 | |

=== Season 2 ===
Viewership and ratings per episode of Crime Scene Kitchen
| No. | Title | Air date | Rating/share (18–49) | Viewers (millions) | Ref. |
|---|---|---|---|---|---|
| 1 | "Premiere: Welcome Self-Taught Bakers" | June 5, 2023 | 0.2/3 | 1.17 | |
| 2 | "Meet the Classically-Trained Competition" | June 12, 2023 | 0.2/2 | 1.02 | |
| 3 | "Self-Taught: Not So Simple" | June 19, 2023 | 0.2/2 | 1.00 | |
| 4 | "Classically-Trained: Going Plum Crazy" | June 26, 2023 | 0.2/2 | 1.09 | |
| 5 | "Self-Taught: Follow the Clues" | July 10, 2023 | 0.2/2 | 1.04 | |
| 6 | "Classically-Trained: Easy as Pie" | July 17, 2023 | 0.2/2 | 1.16 | |
| 7 | "The Merge: A Total Crêpe Shoot" | July 24, 2023 | 0.2/2 | 1.15 | |
| 8 | "The Quarterfinals: A Sticky Situation" | July 31, 2023 | 0.2/3 | 1.20 | |
| 9 | "The Semifinals: It's All in the Details" | August 7, 2023 | 0.2/2 | 1.03 | |
| 10 | "The Finale: I Need a Drink!" | August 14, 2023 | 0.2/2 | 1.01 | |

=== Season 3 ===
Viewership and ratings per episode of Crime Scene Kitchen
| No. | Title | Air date | Rating/share (18–49) | Viewers (millions) | Ref. |
|---|---|---|---|---|---|
| 1 | "Premiere: It's A Family Affair" | September 26, 2024 | 0.2/1 | 1.06 | |
| 2 | "The One with the Friends" | October 3, 2024 | 0.2/2 | 1.12 | |
| 3 | "Keep Your Family Close, and Your Pans Closer" | October 10, 2024 | 0.1/1 | 0.95 | |
| 4 | "The Proof Is in the Mousse" | October 17, 2024 | 0.2/2 | 1.05 | |
| 5 | "Let's Get Ready to Ravi" | October 24, 2024 | 0.1/1 | 1.00 | |
| 6 | "Fruit, Flowers and Friends" | October 31, 2024 | 0.2/2 | 1.09 | |
| 7 | "The Merge" | November 7, 2024 | 0.2/1 | 0.98 | |
| 8 | "The Quarterfinals" | November 14, 2024 | 0.2/2 | 1.11 | |
| 9 | "The Semifinals" | November 21, 2024 | 0.2/2 | 1.07 | |
| 10 | "The Finale" | December 5, 2024 | 0.2/1 | 1.04 | |
