= Family Law (Canadian TV series) =

2021 Canadian legal drama TV series

- Genre: Legal drama; Comedy drama
- Created by: Susin Nielsen
- Starring: Jewel Staite; Zach Smadu; Genelle Williams; Lauren Holly; Victor Garber
- Opening theme: "Uh-Oh" by Jeremy Fisher featuring Serena Ryder
- Country of origin: Canada
- Original language: English
- No. of seasons: 4
- No. of episodes: 40

Production
- Executive producers: Tom Cox and; Jordy Randall; Erin Haskett
- Production locations: Vancouver, British Columbia, Canada
- Production companies: SEVEN24 Films; Lark Productions; Corus Entertainment; Lionsgate Canada

Original release
- Network: Global
- Release: September 16, 2021 – March 28, 2026

Family Law is a Canadian legal comedy-drama television series that premiered on September 16, 2021, on Global. The second season premiered on May 22, 2023, and the third premiered on January 5, 2025. In January 2024, the series was renewed for a fourth season, later confirmed as the final season, which premiered on January 8, 2026.

== Premise ==
Abigail Bianchi, a recovering alcoholic and lawyer, goes to work with her estranged father Harry and two half-siblings, Daniel and Lucy. She has never worked in family law before and suddenly finds herself having to manage not just her clients' family dysfunction, but her own. She must learn to navigate working with her father and siblings she does not know as part of her probation, all while trying to maintain her sobriety.

== Cast and characters ==
=== Main ===
- Jewel Staite as Abigail "Abby" Bianchi (nee Svensson), a recovering alcoholic lawyer who hits rock bottom after a video of her vomiting in court goes viral.
- Victor Garber as Harry Svensson, Abigail's estranged father and boss. A noted womanizer, he married three times: first to Abigail's mother, second to Daniel's mother, and last to Lucy's mother.
- Zach Smadu as Daniel Svensson, Abigail's half-brother and lawyer who is working for his father.
- Genelle Williams as Lucy Svensson, Abigail's half-sister, whose mother died when she was eight. She works at the law firm as a psychologist. Lucy has a PhD from Stanford.
- Lauren Holly as Joanne Kowalski (seasons 2–4; recurring season 1), Abigail's mother and Harry's first ex-wife

=== Recurring ===
- Bobbi Charlton as Jerri Rifkin, Harry's office manager and closest advisor
- Luke Camilleri as Frank Bianchi, Abigail's ex-husband
- Eden Summer Gilmore as Sofia Bianchi, Abigail's daughter
- Brenden Sunderland as Nico Bianchi (seasons 1–3; guest season 4), Abigail's son
- Brett Kelly as Cecil Patterson, Svensson & Svensson's paralegal
- Yvonne Chapman as Danielle Lim (season 1), Daniel's ex-fiancée
- Ali Liebert as Maggie Roth (seasons 1 & 2; guest seasons 3 & 4), Lucy's ex-wife who is a paramedic
- Kelli Ogmundson as Nina Beasley (seasons 1 & 2; guest seasons 3 & 4), the receptionist at Svensson & Associates who later leaves the firm in the second season to go backpacking with her dad
- Peter Bryant as Phillip Sterling, a lawyer and a friend of Harry
- Birkett Turton as Yannick Krol, a lawyer and a friend of Daniel
- B.J. Harrison as Cordelia (seasons 2 & 4; guest season 3), Abby's divorce lawyer and Harry's old flame and judge in season four.
- Miranda Edwards as Martina Hadish (seasons 2 & 3), a chef and Daniel's lover/friend
- Paul McGillion as Chip Crombie (season 3; guest season 2), a lawyer turned judge
- Ryan Lino as Winston Verdad (seasons 2–4), the receptionist at Svensson & Svensson
- Spencer Lord as Aiden (seasons 2 & 3), a firefighter and Abby's younger boyfriend
- Benjamin Ayres as Ben Cohen (seasons 3 & 4), a criminal defence lawyer who has a passing interest in Abby
- Aliyah O'Brien as Kelly Garcia (season 3; guest season 4), a psychologist and Lucy's girlfriend
- Thomas Cadrot as Quinn (season 3; guest season 4), Martina's husband

=== Guest ===
- Celia Reid as Asha (season 1), the woman whom Lucy is having an affair with
- Carmen Aguirre as Zina Selva (seasons 3 & 4), Daniel's mother, Harry's second ex-wife, and a Human Rights lawyer who owns her own firm
- Nathan Fillion as Bud (season 4)

== Episodes ==
=== Series overview ===
| Season | Episodes | Originally aired | |
| Season | Episodes | First aired | Last aired |
|---|---|---|---|
| 1 | 10 | September 16, 2021 | November 17, 2021 |
| 2 | 10 | May 22, 2023 | July 31, 2023 |
| 3 | 10 | January 5, 2025 | March 30, 2025 |
| 4 | 10 | January 8, 2026 | March 28, 2026 |

=== Season 1 (2021) ===
| No. overall | No. in season | Title | Directed by | Written by | Original release date | Prod. code | Canadian viewers |
|---|---|---|---|---|---|---|---|
| 1 | 1 | "Sins of the Fathers" | Jordan Canning | Susin Nielsen | September 16, 2021 | 411390-1 | 652,000 |
Abigail, an alcoholic lawyer, shows up during a court proceeding hungover and throws up on her client. The video of the event goes viral on the internet. Her life hits rock bottom as she loses her position at her firm and moves in to her mother’s house, separated from her husband Frank and her two children. Three months later, Abigail's estranged father, Harry, offers her a menial position in his law firm during her probation where she meets her half-brother, Daniel, who is lawyer working for their father, and her half-sister, Lucy, who is a psychologist. Initially, Abigail doesn’t get along with her half-siblings. Abigail soon becomes involved in a case where a teenage girl wants to locate her biological father and, when Abigail does locate him, the teen girl's single mother worries about her daughter becoming too attached to the man with whom she once had a fling.
| 2 | 2 | "Parenthood" | Jordan Canning | Susin Nielsen | September 24, 2021 | 411390-2 | N/A |
Daniel’s girlfriend Danielle is helping the firm to revamp and modernize its online presence. Daniel and Abigail represent a pregnant couple with Down Syndrome who are afraid that Social Services will take away their baby if they find them incapable of parenting. Meanwhile, Abigail is banned from her son Nico’s school after she confronts and physically threatens her son’s bullies. Harry asks Abigail not to be part of the group photo for the firm’s website because of her infamy and bad reputation. Elsewhere, Lucy panics at her spouse, Maggie’s, suggestion that they have a baby; she meets a woman, Asha, at a bar and the two hook up.
| 3 | 3 | "Addicted to Love" | David Frazee | Susin Nielsen | October 1, 2021 | 411390-3 | N/A |
Daniel and Abigail defend a stay-at-home mother with an online gaming addiction after her husband sues her for custody of their children due to her negligent parenting and her gaming avatar having sex with another player’s avatar. Daniel arbitrates the custody of a divorced couple's dog. Daniel and Danielle get engaged while Abigail, feeling melancholic after stalking Felicity, her ex-husband Frank's new girlfriend, on Instagram, falls off the wagon and gets drunk in Harry’s office.
| 4 | 4 | "Mama Don't Preach" | David Frazee | Story by : Corey Liu; Teleplay by : Sonja Bennett | October 8, 2021 | 411390-4 | N/A |
Harry confronts Abigail about her drinking while she hydrates to avoid alcohol detection on a breath analyzer. Daniel and Abigail represent a gay teenager, Aaron, who wants to be emancipated from his conservative parents because they are forcing him to attend a gay conversion camp. Abigail sends Cecil, the firm’s paralegal, undercover to the gay conversion camp, where he rescues Aaron from electrical shock treatment aversion therapy, following which Aaron’s father starts accepting his sexuality. Harry meets his grandchildren Sofia and Nico for the first time. Jerri accompanies Abigail to her first AA meeting.
| 5 | 5 | "Until Death Do Us Part" | Alysse Leite-Rogers | Damon Vignale | October 15, 2021 | 411390-5 | N/A |
Harry’s girlfriend Clemence informs him that he gave her chlamydia, which he contracted from another woman he was seeing during the relationship. Abigail and Daniel represent Ira, Daniel’s onetime neighbor, who wants his wife, Helen, moved from a care home that he claims is worsening her Alzheimer's; Ira's daughter, Mariam, doesn't want Helen moved and holds power of attorney. Ira challenges her in court, revealing that Helen is in a relationship at the care home. Clemence sues Harry and Harry asks Abigail to represent him against Clemence, who has hired Abigail’s ex-boss. Meanwhile, Maggie’s parents are visiting, which annoys Lucy. Also, Daniel is having second thoughts about marrying Danielle and Harry gives him advice to get a prenup. Abigail visits her old office with Harry and settles the case with Clemence via an apology from Harry. Daniel refuses to marry Danielle.
| 6 | 6 | "Baby Off Board" | Alysse Leite-Rogers | Sarah Dodd | October 22, 2021 | 411390-6 | N/A |
Abigail starts seeing a psychiatrist and considers her mother's role in her father's abandonment. At the same time, Abigail represents a couple during an adoption process, but later the couple finds that their adopted baby has a serious medical condition. The wife wants to keep the child, but the husband doesn't. Daniel and Abigail represent the wife, but Harry is concerned that the husband is hiding something and he hires Abigail’s private investigator to find out what. Daniel pushes to be made partner at Svensson and Associates, but Harry declines, saying Daniel is not business-minded enough. Abigail and Frank go out to dinner to meet Sofia’s boyfriend, where Abigail sees Lucy making out with Asha. Also, Daniel and Danielle’s breakup is out in the open.
| 7 | 7 | "Three's Company" | Mathias Herndl | Ken Craw | October 29, 2021 | 411390-7 | N/A |
Abigail and Daniel represent a starving artist who was once the third member of a polyamorous relationship involving a famous conservative political commentator, Crystal Steele. Abigail confronts Lucy about her ongoing extra-marital affair with Asha. The office gets attacked by Crystal Steele's followers. After Abigail’s home address is doxed online and she gets abusive and threatening texts from Steele’s fans, Frank and the kids stay with her at her mother's house. Daniel regrets dumping Danielle. Harry beefs up the office security as they start losing clients. Frank and Abigail bond and sleep together at her mother’s house. Crystal hires Harry as her divorce attorney. To Daniel's dismay, Harry picks Abigail to assist him with Crystal's case.
| 8 | 8 | "Truthiness" | Mathias Herndl | Sonja Bennett & Ken Craw | November 5, 2021 | 411390-8 | N/A |
Harry and Abigail represent Crystal in her divorce settlement. Abigail agrees to defend a longtime friend who is refusing to vaccinate her child. Daniel is bitter over Harry's rejection of his partnership proposal. Nico gets suspended from school when he is caught forging parents' signatures for other students for money, forcing Abigail and Frank to reconsider their parenting agreement. Lucy tells Maggie about her affair, minimizing its length and depth; Maggie forgives her and they reconcile. Lucy later runs into Asha and they make out.
| 9 | 9 | "Blame It on the Mother" | Andy Mikita | Sarah Dodd | November 12, 2021 | 411390-9 | N/A |
Abigail and Daniel represent two sisters who are being sued by their estranged mother for parental support. Harry’s speech at his alma mater becomes fodder for internet memes and trolling. Daniel considers leaving Svensson for a rival firm. Lucy is sad and angry when Harry fails to show up on their planned meeting on her deceased mother’s birthday. Daniel, Lucy, Abigail, and Jerri get upset upon learning that Harry is dating Crystal. It's the final straw for Daniel, who quits the firm. Lucy tells Maggie that she is ready to have a baby.
| 10 | 10 | "Legacy" | Andy Mikita | Susin Nielsen | November 17, 2021 | 411390-10 | N/A |
Maggie undergoes insemination at a fertility clinic. After Nina, the receptionist at Svensson, discovers she is not her father's biological daughter, Abigail traces a history of malpractice at the fertility clinic where Nina was conceived. Abigail asks Harry to re-hire Daniel and Harry makes him a partner at the firm. Abigail and Daniel file a class action lawsuit against Dr. Peterson, with Nina and her father as plaintiffs. Harry asks Abigail to stay at Svensson after her probation, saying the firm needs her legal skills. Maggie runs into Asha, who tells her about her last encounter with Lucy. Maggie ends her relationship with Lucy and informs her that she is pregnant. Abigail catches Frank meeting Felicity. Lucy goes to Abigail and breaks down.

=== Season 2 (2023) ===
| No. overall | No. in season | Title | Directed by | Written by | Original release date | Prod. code |
|---|---|---|---|---|---|---|
| 11 | 1 | "Revisionist History" | Andy Mikita | Susin Nielsen | May 22, 2023 | 411390-11 |
A woman, Norma, hires Abigail and Daniel to track down her presumed-dead husband, a failed inventor who left her heavily in debt. When found, the man claims to suffer from amnesia and Abigail convinces Norma to sue him for emotional distress to recover her money. In her psychiatric evaluation, Lucy concludes the husband's amnesia may be genuine, causing tension between her and Abigail. Hoping to get his kids to accept his relationship with Crystal, Harry arranges a family dinner, which backfires disastrously. Maggie angrily rejects Lucy's attempt to apologize for her infidelity. Abigail considers reconciling with Frank, but Sofia finds text messages proving his affair was serious and shows them to Abigail.
| 12 | 2 | "I Now Pronoun You" | Andy Mikita | Corey Liu | May 29, 2023 | 411390-12 |
Sofia's friend Chloe wants to start taking transitional therapy, but her grandfather files a motion to intercede, forcing Abigail and Daniel to take her case. Daniel tries to make changes around the office, irritating Abigail and Lucy. When reporters from a conservative news network show up at Chloe's school, Harry realizes Crystal tipped them off after they discussed the case, so he breaks up with her. Abigail deals with Frank's attempts to make amends and Sofia's refusal to see him.
| 13 | 3 | "Under the Influence" | Alysse Leite-Rogers | Sarah Dodd | June 12, 2023 | 411390-13 |
Abigail and Daniel work on a divorce case for Sabine, a woman whose husband claims she is in thrall to a cult posing as a wellness program. Abigail and Lucy investigate undercover at the program and help Sabine escape. The firm's class-action suit against Dr. Peterson falters when they learn his assets are protected by shell companies. Daniel works hard to find a legal argument to access the assets, but Harry steals his thunder by arguing the case in court himself. Cecil works up the courage to ask Nina out but, before he can do so, she says she is taking a leave of absence to travel the world. After couples therapy with Frank, Abigail decides to end the marriage.
| 14 | 4 | "Return to Sender" | Alysse Leite-Rogers | Sonja Bennett | June 19, 2023 | 411390-14 |
Abigail and Daniel represent Karolinka, a Slavic mail-order bride whose husband plans to annul their marriage and have her deported. Though unable to prevent the annulment, Abigail finds her a job with the marriage agency that placed her so she can stay in Canada. In the aftermath of a failed date, Daniel gets to know Martina, a chef. Meanwhile, Lucy learns Maggie has moved on to a new relationship. Elsewhere, Harry works on a prenup with Phil Sterling for an influencer couple. Their demands become ever more complicated until eventually Harry convinces them not to sign a prenup at all. Also, Nico is upset by Abigail's divorce; Harry consoles him. Abigail's separation negotiations with Frank bog down and she hires Cordelia, an old flame of Harry's, to represent her in her divorce.
| 15 | 5 | "Fifty Shades of Judginess" | Gail Harvey | Susin Nielsen | June 26, 2023 | 411390-15 |
Phaedra is a recent widow who hires Harry and Abigail to represent her; Phaedra was a wealthy man's escort before marrying him, so his daughter wants her written out of his will. Abigail and Cordelia have their first meeting with Frank and his divorce lawyer. Daniel gives an interview suggesting he is the future of the firm and Harry is old-fashioned; Harry reacts angrily. Meanwhile, Daniel and his new girlfriend Clara spend some time with Lucy and Martina. When Joanne leaves Abigail's children unsupervised to go out drinking while Abigail is on a blind date, Nico runs away to see Harry while Sofia sneaks out and comes home drunk. In response, Frank files for full custody, requiring Abigail's parenting to be thoroughly evaluated by a psychiatrist.
| 16 | 6 | "Wicked Games" | Gail Harvey | Ken Craw | July 3, 2023 | 411390-16 |
Abigail and Daniel take the case of Jessie, a teacher with a neurodivergent son who claims her ex-husband is harassing her to make her look crazy. Daniel suspects Jessie may be inflicting the harassment on herself; Abigail and he eventually discover Jessie's new boyfriend Gary is the culprit. Meanwhile, Abigail is asked on a date by Aidan, a fireman she meets while working on Jessie's case. Also, Cecil befriends Winston, the firm's new receptionist. Elsewhere, Clara breaks up with Daniel upon realizing he can't accept she previously dated Harry. A psychiatrist interviews Abigail for her custody evaluation and she becomes emotional, accusing Frank of wanting to take away her children and causing the psychiatrist to end the interview abruptly.
| 17 | 7 | "Arrested Development" | David Frazee | Ken Craw | July 10, 2023 | 411390-17 |
Abigail and Daniel represent Drew, an unemployed 40-year-old man whose overprotective parents are trying to evict him from their basement. Incensed Frank is representing the parents, Abigail insists on going to court, but loses. Ultimately, Drew's parents allow him to stay in exchange for him working on his career for the time being. Meanwhile, Cecil is forced to take the paralegal exam after Jerri discovers he never qualified; with Winston's help, he overcomes his fears and passes. Elsewhere, a client of Harry's switches to Phil Sterling's firm upon reading Daniel's interview; Harry wins her back by tipping her off about a case Phil botched. Also, the psychiatrist interviews Abigail's family for the custody evaluation: Daniel hedges when asked whether Abigail is still drinking; Harry strongly defends Abigail, but admits he's been out of her life for decades; Lucy dismisses the psychiatrist's questions and asserts Abigail is a good parent; Joanne hints she forced Abigail to take her side against Harry in their divorce. Abigail's first date with Aidan goes badly until she finally opens up about her personal problems and they become intimate. In the end, Frank's lawyer informs Abigail she can have equal custody on the condition that the children have no contact with Joanne, a high-functioning alcoholic herself, thus making it impossible for Abigail to comply.
| 18 | 8 | "The Good, the Bad, and the Pugly" "Family History" | Sarah Wayne Callies | Sarah Dodd | July 17, 2023 | 411390-18 |
Jerri's estranged daughter Christina refuses to let Jerri see her granddaughter. Believing this is due to transphobia, Abby confronts Christina, but learns that isn't the reason for the estrangement. Harry persuades Christina to attend counseling with Jerri, where it is revealed Jerri suppressed memories of her alcoholism and erratic behavior which frightened Christina as a child. Later, Jerri and Christina begin to reconcile. Meanwhile, Abigail brings Aidan to a professional gathering as her plus-one in order to antagonize Frank. Also, Harry counsels Lucy on her separation from Maggie, advising her not to offer support for Maggie's child. The former owner of Daniel's dog Craig blackmails Daniel into paying to keep him. Lucy finds Maggie bleeding and calls 911.
| 19 | 9 | "Acting Out" | David Frazee | Sonja Bennett & Corey Liu | July 24, 2023 | 411390-19 |
The firm takes the case of Charisma, a pop starlet whose erratic behavior prompted her brother to file for a conservatorship. Realizing Charisma is rebelling against the stress and restrictions of her career, Abigail convinces the judge not to grant the conservatorship. Meanwhile, Maggie's baby, Harmony, is delivered by C-section and Lucy bonds with her while Maggie recuperates in the hospital. Elsewhere, Daniel botches a live interview with comical results. Also, Joanne stays at a friend's place so that Abigail can have time with her kids. After meeting Nico, Aidan suggests spending time with Abigail's kids, but she replies she would only allow it if the relationship were serious. Daniel impulsively kisses Martina, causing her to run off. The psychiatrist's custody evaluation is critical of both Abigail and Frank over her alcoholism and his frequent infidelity, but Frank refuses to back down and opts to go to court rather than resolve his and Abigail's differences informally. Maggie refuses to allow Lucy to participate in Harmony's life.
| 20 | 10 | "All Happy Families" | Andy Mikita | Susin Nielsen | July 31, 2023 | 411390-20 |
On finally completing her probation, Abigail receives a lucrative job offer from her old law firm and a stingy one from Harry, causing friction between father and daughter. The judge in Abigail and Frank's divorce case awards 50/50 custody and mandates they alternate weeks living in the same house for their children's sake. Meanwhile, Daniel is forced to lay off Cecil in order to cut the firm's costs. Having signed away her parental rights for Harmony on Harry's advice, Lucy hires Abigail to sue to get them back. Lucy wins, but afterwards discovers Maggie has abandoned her apartment and disappeared with the baby. Harry makes Abigail a better offer and she accepts, irritating Daniel who had expected her to leave the firm. Harry then rehires Cecil, anticipating Abigail will bring in more money. Daniel visits Martina to apologize for kissing her; before he can do so, she kisses him. At the end, Abigail catches Joanne in bed with Harry.

=== Season 3 (2025) ===
| No. overall | No. in season | Title | Directed by | Written by | Original release date | Prod. code |
|---|---|---|---|---|---|---|
| 21 | 1 | "What Came First?" | Andy Mikita | Susin Nielsen | January 5, 2025 | 411390-21 |
Abigail represents Hannah, a woman whose ex-husband wants to use a frozen embryo they created to have a child with his new husband. Daniel ends his affair with Martina, hoping she will choose him over her boyfriend. Abigail clashes with Frank over their nesting arrangement. Lucy refuses Abigail’s offer to have Maggie extradited from Florida, where she is hiding with Harmony. Meanwhile, Harry takes on a lucrative new client, Sabrina Bass, who is divorcing her wealthy husband. Lucy meets Kelly, a fellow psychiatrist. Abigail reacts with hostility when Joanne reveals she is moving in with Harry. Elsewhere, Daniel runs into Martina’s boyfriend, Quinn.
| 22 | 2 | "A River in Egypt" | Andy Mikita | Sarah Dodd | January 12, 2025 | 411390-22 |
The firm attempts to help Nina’s father Brian after he marries a con artist who steals all his money and flees. Harry’s rival Chip Crombie is appointed a judge and Abigail insults him; in retaliation, he rules against Daniel in court. Martina chooses to stay with Quinn and Daniel befriends him. Lucy continues to spend time with Kelly. Abigail consults with Ben Cohen, a criminal lawyer, on Brian’s case, but he is unhelpful. Abigail has Cecil go undercover to entrap the con artist and they have her arrested. Afterwards, Ben asks Abigail out, but she declines.
| 23 | 3 | "It's the End of the World as We Know It" | Jordan Canning | Ken Craw | January 19, 2025 | 411390-23 |
Abigail and Daniel are hired by Magnus, a climate activist whose in-laws want custody of his children after he was arrested during protests. Abigail and Lucy become concerned with the intensity of his children’s involvement in his activism. After his daughter engages in a risky protest, Abigail declines to represent him; he later decides to let his children live with his in-laws so he can pursue activism. When Harry asks Crystal to return a family heirloom, she files an ethics complaint alleging they started dating when she was still his client. Abigail breaks up with Aidan, as he wants kids in the future and she doesn’t. During Harry’s ethics hearing, it is revealed he dated several women while they were his clients; he is then suspended from practicing law.
| 24 | 4 | "Play It Straight" | Jordan Canning | Corey Liu | January 26, 2025 | 411390-24 |
Abigail and Daniel take on one of Harry’s clients, Zander, an actor who wants to stop his ex-husband from outing him in a play. Abigail learns the ex is using Zander’s texts as material for a new TV show and successfully sues him. After having a breakdown from the stress of staying in the closet, Zander decides to star in his ex’s show while coming out publicly. Meanwhile, Kelly moves in with Lucy, irritating Abigail who does not get along with her. After meeting Quinn, Yannick tells Daniel he is a fabulist. When Harry nearly violates his suspension, his children threaten him to get him to step away from the firm until his suspension is over. Frank offers to modify his and Abigail’s separation agreement to let Aidan see their children, claiming it’s a favor; afterwards, Abigail learns Frank has introduced their children to his new girlfriend.
| 25 | 5 | "Between a Rock and a Hard Place" | David Frazee | Story by : Sonja Bennett and Jordan Hall; Teleplay by : Susin Nielsen | February 23, 2025 | 411390-25 |
Abigail represents the Gardiners, a couple struggling to care for their autistic teenage son Rory. She advises them to surrender Rory to the Ministry so he can get the care he needs. The Ministry accuses the Gardiners of child neglect and Abigail goes to court to defend their parental rights. In Harry’s absence, Daniel has to get creative to convince Sabrina Bass to retain the firm for her divorce. Meanwhile, Harry has difficulty adjusting to life at home; he enlists Cecil to keep track of the firm’s activities for him. A jealous Abigail has Winston and Cecil track down Frank’s new girlfriend Isabelle; she later agrees to allow Frank to introduce her to their children. At Kelly’s instigation, Lucy asks Abigail to move out of her apartment.
| 26 | 6 | "When the Chip Hits the Fan" | David Frazee | Susin Nielsen | March 2, 2025 | 411390-26 |
After having a heart attack during a heated argument with Abigail, Judge Chip Crombie is revealed to be a bigamist. His second wife hires Abigail to prove their marriage was legitimate. Ultimately, both Chip’s wives decide to leave him. Meanwhile, Daniel represents Parvin, a woman whose mother is demanding payment for taking care of her child. Pressured by Harry to be more aggressive, Daniel uses harsh tactics to win. Abigail runs into Ben Cohen at an A.A. meeting and they begin a relationship. Also, Daniel has dinner with Lucy and Kelly shows her disapproval of him. Abigail and Ben play a prank on Isabelle. Later, Maggie tries to call Lucy, but Kelly intercepts the call, tells her not to contact Lucy, and deletes her number.
| 27 | 7 | "Bass Fishing" | Alysse Leite-Rogers | Sarah Dodd | March 9, 2025 | 411390-27 |
Sabrina Bass’ divorce proceedings are halted when Daniel’s estranged lawyer mother Zina Bayat (Carmen Aguirre) produces evidence that Sabrina’s husband, Connery, embezzled from his clients. Upon discovering Sabrina was complicit, Abigail demands Daniel drop her as a client; Daniel ignores her and reaches a divorce settlement with Connery. Feeling competitive with Isabelle, Abigail goes overboard in doing activities with her children. Meanwhile, Joanne throws a housewarming party; Kelly malingers to get Lucy to leave early and Joanne appears to be ambivalent about her relationship with Harry. Daniel is shocked to learn Quinn and Martina are getting married. After Zina goes public about Sabrina’s role in Connery’s crimes, Daniel realizes Abigail tipped her off about Sabrina’s involvement.
| 28 | 8 | "Where There's a Will" | Alysse Leite-Rogers | Corey Liu | March 16, 2025 | 411390-28 |
Abigail and Frank end up on opposite sides of a case, representing a sister and brother in a dispute over their late father’s inheritance. Greek restauranteur Cosmo is sued by his father and hires Daniel and Harry to defend him. The conflict between Cosmo and his father over their restaurant mirrors that between Daniel and Harry over the firm. After the case is resolved, Harry offers to make Daniel an equity partner. Daniel agrees to emcee Martina’s wedding. Meanwhile, Kelly accidentally injures Lucy during an argument; they reconcile, but Kelly continues to be controlling and abusive, booking a vacation for her and Lucy without telling her. At Nico’s school concert, Abigail is forced to endure the other parents’ disapproval; afterward, she calls Ben for support, but he does not answer.
| 29 | 9 | "Catch 22" "To the End of Love" | Agam Darshi | Sonja Bennett | March 23, 2025 | 411390-29 |
Abigail’s elderly new client, Naomi, seeks authorization for euthanasia before her Alzheimer’s disease destroys her right to consent, but Naomi’s son sues to block her. Abigail wins the case, but Naomi's condition deteriorates and she is no longer legally able to consent. Naomi chooses to die without medical assistance and Abigail helps her son say goodbye. Meanwhile, Martina admits to Daniel she loves both him and Quinn. Cecil becomes intimate with Roz, the court clerk. Jealous of Isabelle’s closeness with Sofia and Nico, Abigail deliberately upstages her by taking the children to the same circus to which Isabelle planned to take them. Abigail rejects Isabelle’s first attempt to make peace but, prompted by Ben, reconciles with her. Elsewhere, Harry’s plans to move in with Joanne make her realize she cannot overcome the memory of his past infidelity, so she ends their relationship for good.
| 30 | 10 | "The Chickens Come Home to Roost" | Andy Mikita | Susin Nielsen | March 30, 2025 | 411390-30 |
While helping her client Carla get child support, Abigail discovers Carla’s daughter was switched at birth with another couple’s and goes to court when that couple sues to stop Carla from seeing her. Frank’s plans to move in with Isabelle prompt Abigail to consider selling their house. Embittered by Joanne’s dumping him, Harry unfairly blames Abigail for the breakup and loses patience with his client, a woman remarrying the same man for the third time. At Martina’s wedding, Daniel accidentally announces their affair to the guests and has to leave in disgrace. Meanwhile, Lucy runs into Maggie on the street. Learning that Kelly blocked Maggie's calls and also that Kelly has been trying to isolate her from everyone she knows, Lucy finally confronts Kelly about her controlling and abusive behavior and breaks up with her, demanding that she move out. Kelly refuses to leave and continues to stay in Lucy’s apartment, insisting they will work things out. Also, Abigail is shaken after discovering that Sofia wrote a school essay about her alcoholism. Fearing she will fall off the wagon at any second, Abigail tries calling Ben for consolation but, for the second time, he does not answer the phone. In the end, when Abigail shows up at Ben's house, she discovers that he has quietly relapsed into alcoholism himself.

=== Season 4 (2026) ===
| No. overall | No. in season | Title | Directed by | Written by | Original release date | Prod. code |
|---|---|---|---|---|---|---|
| 31 | 1 | "Fami-lease" "Rent a Family" | Andy Mikita | Susin Nielsen | January 8, 2026 | 411390-31 |
| 32 | 2 | "The Surrogate" | Andy Mikita | Sarah Dodd | January 15, 2026 | 411390-32 |
| 33 | 3 | "Game, Set, Match" "The Shoutout" | David Frazee | Ken Craw | January 22, 2026 | 411390-33 |
| 34 | 4 | "Autonomy" | David Frazee | Sonja Bennett | January 29, 2026 | 411390-34 |
| 35 | 5 | "PG Rating" | Alysse Leite-Rogers | Story by : Scott Button & Corey Liu; Teleplay by : Corey Liu | February 5, 2026 | 411390-35 |
| 36 | 6 | "Corporate Retreat" | Alysse Leite-Rogers | Susin Nielsen | March 1, 2026 | 411390-36 |
| 37 | 7 | "Knowing Me, Knowing You" | Siobhan Devine | Story by : Sonja Bennett & Kaylyn Johnson; Teleplay by : Sonja Bennett | March 8, 2026 | 411390-37 |
| 38 | 8 | "Valley of the Dolls" | Siobhan Devine | Corey Liu | March 15, 2026 | 411390-38 |
| 39 | 9 | "Take My Advice" | Damon Vignale | Sarah Dodd | March 22, 2026 | 411390-39 |
| 40 | 10 | "Second Chances" | Andy Mikita | Susin Nielsen | March 28, 2026 | 411390-40 |
Harry refuses Marcus' condition, and calls off the merger. A shocked Abigail later tells Harry about her plans, causing tension both personally and professionally. Jerri still plans to retire, but promises to help hire and train the new office manager. Cecil puts Winston's name towards the job, despite Winston's plans to go back to school. Harry represents his former shipwright, Fletcher, who wants to be part of his son's life after getting out of prison. While fighting for Fletcher, Joanne reminds him that he doesn't fight the same way for Abigail. Harry offers Abigail a position as equity partner. Daniel is offered a partner position by Zina. Lucy learns her producer is moving departments so that they can have a relationship in the future. Harry and Joanne get married, and Abigail makes a heartfelt speech to them. Cecil admits Roz wants him to move in, and Winston promises they will stay in touch. Jerri tells Abigail about Marcus' condition, and she decides to accept Harry's offer to be a partner, while Daniel opens his own practice using the space Abigail purchased. Abigail accepts Kieran's previous dinner invite. As Harry is about to leave for his and Joanne's honeymoon, a man named Bud shows up at the office, claiming to be his son.

Note: The Original Airdate column refers to Canadian dates on Global. The fourth season is available on the German streaming service WOW in English and dubbed version as of June 2025.

== Production ==
On December 20, 2019, Corus Entertainment announced that the series created by Susin Nielsen for SEVEN24 Films and Lark Productions had been given a ten episode series order. Executive produced by Tom Cox, Jordy Randall and Erin Haskett, the show would be produced and set in Vancouver, British Columbia.

In February 2020, it was reported that principal photography would begin on March 2, 2020. The primary cast members were announced as being all Canadian - Jewel Staite, Victor Garber, Zach Smadu and Genelle Williams.

In advance of the series premiere, Global announced in May 2021 that it had renewed the series for a second season.

On May 17, 2022, Global announced that the series had been renewed for a third season.

On January 31, 2024, Global announced that the series had been renewed for a fourth season.

In December 2025, creator Susin Nielsen confirmed that the series would end with its fourth season.

== Release ==
=== International ===
The series airs in the United States on The CW. It premiered on October 2, 2022. The second season premiered on July 7, 2023. The third season premiered on January 17, 2024. The fourth season premiered on July 23, 2025.

International distribution is managed by Lionsgate. The series premiered in Italy on Sky Investigation on July 6, 2021. The second season premiered on October 5, 2022 and the third season premiered on March 29, 2023. In the Nordics, the third season premiered on April 19, 2023, on Viaplay. In France, the third season premiered on February 5, 2024, on 13ème Rue. The fourth season premiered on June 2, 2025, on Sky One in Germany.

In the UK the 4 series are currently (2026) available on ITV x
