= The Summit (American TV series) =

American reality competition show

- Genre: Game show
- Based on: The Summit
- Presented by: Manu Bennett
- Composer: Uncanny Valley / Matt Dunne (additional music)
- Country of origin: United States
- Original language: English
- No. of seasons: 1
- No. of episodes: 10

Production
- Executive producers: Kevin Lee; Tina Nicotera; Manu Bennett; Sharon Levy; Michael Heyerman
- Production locations: Glenorchy, New Zealand, New Zealand
- Production company: Endemol Shine North America

Original release
- Network: CBS
- Release: September 29 – December 4, 2024

The Summit is an American reality competition television series that premiered with a sneak peek on September 29, 2024, before its timeslot premiere on October 9 on CBS and concluding December 4, 2024. The series is hosted by Manu Bennett and is based on the Australian series of the same name. The goal of the show is a group of contestants are required to climb a mountain; overcoming treacherous physical obstacles along the journey, while at certain points having to adopt a mental and social game as well.

On April 22, 2025, the series was cancelled after one season.

== Format ==
Contestants must climb a mountain, with the goal of reaching the summit, within only fourteen days. Each contestant holds an equal share of the prize money. When a contestant forfeits, or is medically evacuated, their share is removed from the game. At certain points alongside the trail, contestants reach checkpoints, where they are able to rest, and relax; however, this comes at a cost: the contestants in a social vote must vote someone out. The eliminated players' share of the prize money is equally split with the remaining players. The prize pot will disappear completely if the contestants do not reach the summit in the allocated time.

=== Mountain's Keeper ===
The Mountain's Keeper will make appearances throughout the series; she keeps track of the trekkers' movements, is aware of how the physical and social game is commencing, and is watching the group at all times. The Keeper will occasionally throw duffel bags onto the trail, and the contents of those bags may bring twists into the game.

=== Endgame ===
The contestants who make it to the end of the summit will receive a portion of the pot. However, how much they receive will be up to the other contestants. This was alluded to on the show with Bennett saying “Be careful with who you meet on the way up, because you don’t know who you’ll see on the way down" on the start of their journey.

== Location ==
The series was filmed in the Southern Alps, South Island, New Zealand, starting near Glenorchy.

== Series details ==
| Season | Episodes | No. of contestants | Originally aired | | Result | | | |
| Season | Episodes | No. of contestants | Season premiere | Season finale | Remaining contestants at Summit | Initial Prize | Remaining Prize | Decision? |
|---|---|---|---|---|---|---|---|---|
| 1 | 10 | 16 | September 29, 2024 | December 4, 2024 | 3 | $1 million | $750k | Unequally split |

== Season 1 (2024) ==
=== Contestants ===
| Name | Age | Hometown | Occupation | Left | Reason for exit |
|---|---|---|---|---|---|
| Nick Morgan | 28 | Madisonville, Louisiana | Salesman | Ep. 10 | Completed |
| Punkin Jackson | 33 | Columbus, Mississippi | Air Force Master Sergeant | Ep. 10 | Completed |
| Therron Pittman | 29 | Los Angeles, California | Waiter | Ep. 10 | Completed |
| Jeannie Geyer | 56 | Mahopac, New York | Grocery Store Employee | Ep. 10 | Nick chose to eliminate |
| Beckylee Rawls | 27 | San Diego, California | Construction Manager | Ep. 9 | Eliminated at checkpoint |
| Amy Stephens | 46 | Edisto Island, South Carolina | Bank Manager | Ep. 8 | Eliminated at checkpoint |
| Dusty Fisher | 28 | Boise, Idaho | Real Estate Agent | Ep. 8 | Therron chose to eliminate |
| Dennis Cho | 29 | Indianapolis, Indiana | Nurse | Ep. 7 | Eliminated at checkpoint |
| Jennye Stirlen | 37 | Cary, North Carolina | MMA Referee | Ep. 6 | Eliminated at checkpoint |
| Pati Arana | 37 | Los Angeles, California | Barber | Ep. 5 | Eliminated at checkpoint |
| Robert Culp | 42 | Bolingbrook, Illinois | Educator | Ep. 4 | Eliminated at checkpoint |
| Geoff Green | 28 | Sharpsburg, Georgia | Neuroscientist | Ep. 3 | Eliminated at checkpoint |
| Shweta Choudhury | 28 | Los Angeles, California | Corporate Strategist | Ep. 2 | Eliminated at checkpoint |
| Bo Martin | 52 | Gun Barrel City, Texas | Teacher/Coach | Ep. 2 | Eliminated in challenge by sacrifice |
| Rose Mattie | 41 | Chandler, Arizona | Stay-At-Home-Mom | Ep. 1 | Eliminated at checkpoint |
| Tony Reyes | 36 | Austin, Texas | Media Director | Ep. 1 | Medically Evacuated |

==== Elimination ====
Color key:
– Completed The Summit and received a share of the prize
– Eliminated and lost the money
– Evacuated/Withdrew from the competition and lost the money
– Eliminated at a checkpoint and money was stolen
– Eliminated, money was stolen, but stole from the cash pot
– Trekker had immunity
– Given Power to Eliminate (PE) a Trekker

| Name | Episode | | | | | | | | | | |
|---|---|---|---|---|---|---|---|---|---|---|---|
| Name | 1 | 2 | 3 | 4 | 5 | 6 | 7 | 8 | 9 | 10 | |
| Nick | | | | | | | | | | PE | Completed $500k |
| Punkin | | | | | | | | | | | Completed $250k |
| Therron | | | | | | | | PE | | | Completed $250k |
| Jeannie | | | | Immunity | | | | | | Eliminated | —N/a |
| Beckylee | | | | | | | | | Eliminated | —N/a | |
| Amy | | | | | | | | Eliminated | —N/a | | |
| Dusty | | | | | | | | Eliminated | —N/a | | |
| Dennis | | | | | | | Eliminated | —N/a | | | |
| Jennye | | | | | | Eliminated | —N/a | | | | |
| Pati | | | | | Eliminated | —N/a | | | | | |
| Robert | | | | Eliminated | —N/a | | | | | | |
| Geoff | | | Eliminated | —N/a | | | | | | | |
| Shweta | | Eliminated | —N/a | | | | | | | | |
| Bo | | Eliminated | —N/a | | | | | | | | |
| Rose | Eliminated | —N/a | | | | | | | | | |
| Tony | Withdrew | —N/a | | | | | | | | | |
| Prize | $937,000 | $870,536 | $870,536 | $870,536 | $870,536 | $870,536 | $870,536 | $750,000 | $750,000 | $750,000 | |

- The three finalists were each awarded the $250,000 that they carried. The 13 eliminated players voted on who would receive the $250,000 that was removed from the game; the final vote was Therron 2, Punkin 5, Nick 6.

=== Episodes ===
| No. | Title | Original release date | Prod. code | U.S. viewers (millions) | Rating (18-49) |
|---|---|---|---|---|---|
| 1 | "To the Summit" | September 29, 2024 | 101 | 3.03 | 0.3 |
| 2 | "Hard Choices Must Be Made" | October 9, 2024 | 102 | 1.96 | 0.3 |
| 3 | "Snakes and Ladders" | October 16, 2024 | 103 | 1.82 | 0.2 |
| 4 | "An Unexpected Storm" | October 23, 2024 | 104 | 2.01 | 0.2 |
| 5 | "Succeed Together, Fail Alone" | October 30, 2024 | 105 | 1.87 | 0.2 |
| 6 | "Never Show Your Weakness" | November 6, 2024 | 106 | 1.94 | 0.2 |
| 7 | "The Snowline" | November 13, 2024 | 107 | 1.96 | 0.2 |
| 8 | "Necessary Evils" | November 20, 2024 | 108 | 1.89 | 0.2 |
| 9 | "The Final Checkpoint" | November 27, 2024 | 109 | 2.04 | 0.3 |
| 10 | "Season Finale: Judgment Day" | December 4, 2024 | 110 | 2.27 | 0.2 |

== Production ==
On January 17, 2024, it was announced that CBS had ordered the series with Manu Bennett as the host. On July 13, 2024, it was announced that the series would premiere on September 29, 2024. On September 12, 2024, the contestants were announced. On April 22, 2025, the cancellation of the series was announced.
