= Mark McKinney Needs a Hobby =

Mark McKinney Needs a Hobby is a Canadian documentary television series, which premiered October 2, 2024, on CTV. Hosted by comedian and actor Mark McKinney, the series features McKinney investigating and meeting with practitioners of various hobbies, such as birdwatching, fly fishing, puppetry, robotics, cooking and barbershop quartet singing.

The series is structured on the premise that McKinney is actually looking for a new hobby for himself.
