= Extracted (TV series) =

American reality competition show

- Genre: Reality competition
- Narrated by: Mason Pettit
- Country of origin: United States
- Original language: English
- No. of seasons: 2
- No. of episodes: 20

Production
- Executive producers: Rhett Bachner; Brien Meagher; Sylvester Stallone; Braden Aftergood; Kourosh Taj; Lauren Taylor Harding; Dan Bree; Rob Buchta
- Production location: British Columbia
- Production companies: B17 Entertainment; Balboa Productions; Insight Productions (season 2–present); Fox Entertainment

Original release
- Network: Fox
- Release: February 10, 2025 – present

Extracted is an American reality competition television series that premiered on February 10, 2025, on Fox. It is filmed in the Canadian wilderness. The show's second season began airing on January 26, 2026. On May 11, 2026, the show was renewed for a third season.

== Format ==
Twelve teams composed of one amateur survivalist ("Competitor") and two friends or family members ("Companions") are sent into a forested area in British Columbia, Canada (for season 1) or Northern Ontario, Canada (season 2). The Competitors are each isolated in the wilderness and must do whatever they can (such as finding food and building shelter) to sustain themselves while their actions are monitored by cameras throughout the area. The Companions are together in a nearby compound with a studio where they can watch and listen to all the Competitors. At set intervals throughout the competition, the Companions have the opportunity to aid their teammates by selecting items for survival packages (e.g.: tools, bedding, food and other consumables) that are delivered to the Competitors via drone.

The Competitors are informed that they will have no control on when their participation in the competition ends. The Competitors can only be removed from the wilderness by their Companions, who may press a red "extract" button in the studio to initiate their Competitor's evacuation. Doing so eliminates the entire team from contention. The last team remaining will win a grand prize of $250,000.

== Series overview ==
Season	Episodes	Originally released	
Season	Episodes	First released	Last released
1	10	February 10, 2025	April 21, 2025
2	10	January 26, 2026	April 6, 2026

== Season 1 (2025) ==
=== Contestants ===
Team	Competitor	Age	Occupation & Relation	City of Residence	Episode exited	Status	Ref.
Team Haley	Haley Lindell	26	River guide	Long Island, New York	10	Winners	
Team Haley	Karly Sauve	TBA	Cousin	Long Island, New York	10	Winners	
Team Haley	Natalie Michaels	TBA	Cousin	Long Island, New York	10	Winners	
Team Jake	Jacob "Jake" Denison	35	Mortgage loan officer	Meridian, Idaho	10	Runners-up	
Team Jake	Austin Legg	TBA	Brother	Meridian, Idaho	10	Runners-up	
Team Jake	Justin Denison	TBA	Brother	Meridian, Idaho	10	Runners-up	
Team Meagan	Meagan Delatte Murphy	30	Wellness coach	Mandeville, Louisiana	10	Eliminated	
Team Meagan	Abby Hayes	TBA	Best friend	Mandeville, Louisiana	10	Eliminated	
Team Meagan	Gerrard Delatte	TBA	Father	Mandeville, Louisiana	10	Eliminated	
Team Woody	Woody Kaminer	50	Retired law officer	Grovetown, Georgia	10	Eliminated	
Team Woody	Blake Kaminer	TBA	Son	Grovetown, Georgia	10	Eliminated	
Team Woody	Collin Hodson	TBA	Nephew	Grovetown, Georgia	10	Eliminated	
Team Ryan H.	Ryan Heavner	28	Diesel mechanic	Lincolnton, North Carolina	8	Eliminated	
Team Ryan H.	Roger Heavner	TBA	Father	Lincolnton, North Carolina	8	Eliminated	
Team Ryan H.	Candance B Heavner	TBA	Mother	Lincolnton, North Carolina	8	Eliminated	
Team Jakoben	Jakoben Thomas	25	Off-road event promoter	McComb, Mississippi	7	Eliminated	
Team Jakoben	Terrance	TBA	Uncle	McComb, Mississippi	7	Eliminated	
Team Jakoben	David	TBA	Cousin	McComb, Mississippi	7	Eliminated	
Team Robyn	Robyn Lancaster	56	Personal assistant	Las Vegas, Nevada	6	Eliminated	
Team Robyn	Faith	TBA	Daughter	Las Vegas, Nevada	6	Eliminated	
Team Robyn	Lance	TBA	Husband	Las Vegas, Nevada	6	Eliminated	
Team Ryan W.	Ryan Willis	41	eBay reseller	Conifer, Colorado	5	Eliminated	
Team Ryan W.	Sarah	TBA	Wife	Conifer, Colorado	5	Eliminated	
Team Ryan W.	Sean	TBA	Brother	Conifer, Colorado	5	Eliminated	
Team Rose	Rose Hyak	30	Registered dietician	Denver, Colorado	4	Eliminated	
Team Rose	Kelsey	TBA	Cousin	Denver, Colorado	4	Eliminated	
Team Rose	Laura	TBA	Aunt	Denver, Colorado	4	Eliminated	
Team Ashley	Ashley Tyler-Metheny	38	Fourth grade teacher	Granbury, Texas	4	Eliminated	
Team Ashley	Scott	TBA	Father-in-law	Granbury, Texas	4	Eliminated	
Team Ashley	Austin	TBA	Fiancé	Granbury, Texas	4	Eliminated	
Team Davina	Davina Christy	42	Hairstylist and clown	Jacksonville, Florida	3	Eliminated	
Team Davina	Tori	TBA	Stepdaughter	Jacksonville, Florida	3	Eliminated	
Team Davina	Devin	TBA	Sister	Jacksonville, Florida	3	Eliminated	
Team Anthony	Anthony Banks	18	Model	Dallas, Texas; New York, New York	2	Eliminated	
Team Anthony	Yolanda	TBA	Mother	Dallas, Texas; New York, New York	2	Eliminated	
Team Anthony	Tony Banks	TBA	Father	Dallas, Texas; New York, New York	2	Eliminated	

=== Elimination table ===
Color key:

Winner
Runner-up
Survival Trial Winner
At Risk
Extracted

Place	Team	Episode									
Place	Team	1	2	3	4	5	6	7	8	9	10
1	Haley	SAFE	SAFE	SAFE	SAFE	SAFE	SAFE	RISK	WIN	RISK	WINNER
2	Jake	SAFE	SAFE	SAFE	SAFE	SAFE	SAFE	WIN	SAFE	WIN	RUNNER-UP
3	Woody	RISK	WIN	SAFE	SAFE	SAFE	RISK	WIN	SAFE	RISK	EXTRACTED
4	Meagan	SAFE	SAFE	SAFE	SAFE	SAFE	SAFE	WIN	SAFE	RISK	EXTRACTED
5	Ryan H.	SAFE	RISK	SAFE	SAFE	RISK	SAFE	SAFE	EXTRACTED		
6	Jakoben	SAFE	SAFE	SAFE	SAFE	SAFE	RISK	EXTRACTED			
7	Robyn	SAFE	SAFE	SAFE	SAFE	SAFE	EXTRACTED				
8	Ryan W.	SAFE	SAFE	WIN	SAFE	EXTRACTED					
9	Rose	SAFE	SAFE	SAFE	EXTRACTED						
10	Ashley	SAFE	RISK	RISK	EXTRACTED						
11	Davina	SAFE	SAFE	EXTRACTED							
12	Anthony	SAFE	EXTRACTED								

=== Episodes ===
No. overall	No. in season	Title	Original release date	Prod. code	U.S. viewers (millions)	Rating (18-49)
1	1	"Survive the Night"	February 10, 2025	EXT-101	1.91	0.4
2	2	"Gimme Shelter"	February 17, 2025	EXT-102	1.46	0.2
3	3	"The Hunt"	February 24, 2025	EXT-103	1.67	0.3
4	4	"Surviving the Storm"	March 3, 2025	EXT-104	1.68	0.2
5	5	"Burn Before Reading"	March 10, 2025	EXT-105	1.46	0.2
6	6	"The Game Has Changed"	March 24, 2025	EXT-106	1.40	0.2
7	7	"Family vs. Family"	March 31, 2025	EXT-107	1.53	0.2
8	8	"Mystery Box"	April 7, 2025	EXT-108	1.37	0.2
9	9	"Banished"	April 14, 2025	EXT-109	1.22	0.2
10	10	"The Final Drop"	April 21, 2025	EXT-110	1.44	0.2

== Season 2 (2026) ==
=== Contestants ===
Among the contestants are some former reality TV personalities - including 5-time Survivor contestant and two-time winner, Sandra Diaz-Twine, her daughter a two time Australian Survivor contestant, and winner of The Anonymous, Nina Twine, and Analyse Talavera, who appeared on Big Brother.

Team	Competitor	Age	Occupation & Relation	City of Residence	Episode exited	Status	Ref.
Team RJ	RJ Reynolds (Paired with Eric in Episode 4) (Competed against Doug and Polly in Episode 8)	26	Project Manager	Fort Worth, Texas	10	Winners	
Team RJ	Makala	TBA	Mother	Fort Worth, Texas	10	Winners	
Team RJ	Tanisha	TBA	Aunt	Fort Worth, Texas	10	Winners	
Team Rhoman	Rhoman Eyere (Paired with Amey in Episode 4) (Competed against Luke in Episode 8)	21	Sales Liaison	Spanish Fork, Utah	10	Runners-up	
Team Rhoman	Dallas	TBA	Brother	Spanish Fork, Utah	10	Runners-up	
Team Rhoman	Lynsey	TBA	Mother	Pleasant View, Utah	10	Runners-up	
Team Polly	Polly Pearson (Paired with Luke in Episode 4) (Competed against Doug and RJ in Episode 8)	59	Math Teacher	Holdrege, Nebraska	10	Eliminated	
Team Polly	Molly McClelland	TBA	Sister	Bloomfield Hills, Michigan	10	Eliminated	
Team Polly	Bailey	TBA	Niece	West Bloomfield, Michigan	10	Eliminated	
Team Luke	Luke Olson (Paired with Polly in Episode 4) (Competed against Rhoman in Episode 8)	33	Construction	Overland Park, Kansas	9	Eliminated	
Team Luke	Daniel	TBA	Brother	Kansas City, Missouri	9	Eliminated	
Team Luke	David	TBA	Brother	Lawrence, Kansas	9	Eliminated	
Team Doug	Doug Rogers (Paired with Katie in Episode 4) (Competed against Polly and RJ in Episode 8)	56	Business Consultant	Belmont, North Carolina	9	Eliminated	
Team Doug	Alec Rogers	TBA	Son	Belmont, North Carolina	9	Eliminated	
Team Doug	Dayton Rogers	TBA	Son	Belmont, North Carolina	9	Eliminated	
Team Katie	Katie Kratovil (Paired with Doug in Episode 4)	29	Administrative Assistant	Saratoga Springs, New York	7	Eliminated	
Team Katie	Carly	TBA	Sister	Longmeadow, Massachusetts	7	Eliminated	
Team Katie	Emily	TBA	Sister	Somerville, Massachusetts	7	Eliminated	
Team Amey	Amey Anderson (Paired with Rhoman in Episode 4)	28	Dental Hygienist	Magnolia, Texas	7	Eliminated	
Team Amey	Trung	TBA	Father	Jacksonville, Florida	7	Eliminated	
Team Amey	Skyler	TBA	Husband	Magnolia, Texas	7	Eliminated	
Team Summer	Summer Blalocks	37	General Manager	Sevierville, Tennessee	6	Eliminated	
Team Summer	Stacy	TBA	Mother	Sevierville, Tennessee	6	Eliminated	
Team Summer	Sage	TBA	Brother	Westerly, Rhode Island	6	Eliminated	
Team Eric	Eric Rivera (Paired with RJ in Episode 4)	29	Autobody Technician	Fayetteville, North Carolina	4	Eliminated	
Team Eric	Nina Twine	28	Girlfriend	Fayetteville, North Carolina	4	Eliminated	
Team Eric	Sandra Diaz-Twine	51	Nina's Mother	Fayetteville, North Carolina	4	Eliminated	
Team Jessica-Rey	Jessica-Rey Talavera	30	Legal Administrative Assistant	Los Angeles, California	2	Eliminated	
Team Jessica-Rey	Analyse Talavera	28	Sister	Los Angeles, California	2	Eliminated	
Team Jessica-Rey	Stacy	TBA	Mother	Los Angeles, California	2	Eliminated	
Team Olsen	Olsen Kroeger	20	Student	Washington, Indiana	1	Eliminated	
Team Olsen	Kevin	TBA	Father	Washington, Indiana	1	Eliminated	
Team Olsen	Anna	TBA	Mother	Washington, Indiana	1	Eliminated	

=== Elimination Chart ===
Color key:

Winner
Runner-up
Survival Trial Winner
At Risk
Extracted
Medically Evacuated

Place	Team	Episode									
Place	Team	1	2	3	4	5	6	7	8	9	10
1	RJ	SAFE	SAFE	SAFE	SAFE	SAFE	SAFE	SAFE	SAFE	SAFE	WINNER
2	Rhoman	SAFE	SAFE	SAFE	SAFE	SAFE	SAFE	SAFE	SAFE	SAFE	RUNNER-UP
3	Polly	SAFE	SAFE	SAFE	SAFE	SAFE	SAFE	SAFE	SAFE	SAFE	EXTRACTED
4	Luke	SAFE	SAFE	SAFE	SAFE	SAFE	SAFE	SAFE	SAFE	EXTRACTED	
5	Doug	SAFE	SAFE	SAFE	SAFE	SAFE	SAFE	SAFE	SAFE	EXTRACTED	
6	Katie	SAFE	SAFE	SAFE	SAFE	SAFE	SAFE	EXTRACTED			
7	Amey	SAFE	RISK	SAFE	SAFE	SAFE	SAFE	EXTRACTED			
8	Summer	SAFE	SAFE	SAFE	SAFE	SAFE	EXTRACTED				
9	Eric	SAFE	SAFE	SAFE	EXTRACTED						
10	Jessica-Rey	SAFE	EXTRACTED								
11	Olsen	EXTRACTED									

=== Episodes ===
No. overall	No. in season	Title	Original release date	Prod. code	U.S. viewers (millions)	Rating (18-49)
11	1	"Alone in the Wild"	January 26, 2026	EXT-201	1.89	0.22
12	2	"A Game of Deception"	February 2, 2026	EXT-202	1.50	0.19
13	3	"The Longest Night"	February 9, 2026	EXT-203	1.38	0.15
14	4	"Sink or Swim"	February 16, 2026	EXT-204	1.57	0.22
15	5	"A Juicy Power Play"	February 23, 2026	EXT-205	N/A	TBA
16	6	"Bitter Cold Consequences"	March 2, 2026	EXT-206	N/A	TBA
17	7	"Breaking Points and Power Plays"	March 16, 2026	EXT-207	N/A	TBA
18	8	"Swim for Your Life"	March 23, 2026	EXT-208	N/A	TBA
19	9	"Banishment"	March 30, 2026	EXT-209	N/A	TBA
20	10	"Last One Standing"	April 6, 2026	EXT-210	N/A	TBA

== Reception ==
=== Ratings ===
Viewership and ratings per episode of Extracted
No.	Title	Air date	Rating/share (18–49)	Viewers (millions)	DVR (18–49)	DVR viewers (millions)	Total (18–49)	Total viewers (millions)	Ref.
1	"Survive the Night"	February 10, 2025	0.4/5	1.91	0.1	0.46	0.5	2.37	
2	"Gimme Shelter"	February 17, 2025	0.2/3	1.46	0.1	0.44	0.3	1.90	
3	"The Hunt"	February 24, 2025	0.3/4	1.67	0.1	0.42	0.4	2.09	
4	"Surviving the Storm"	March 3, 2025	0.2/3	1.68	0.1	0.48	0.3	2.16	
5	"Burn Before Reading"	March 10, 2025	0.2/3	1.46	0.1	0.46	0.3	1.91	
6	"The Game Has Changed"	March 24, 2025	0.2/3	1.40	0.1	0.51	0.3	1.91	
7	"Family vs. Family"	March 31, 2025	0.2/3	1.53	TBD	TBD	TBD	TBD	
8	"Mystery Box"	April 7, 2025	0.2/3	1.37	TBD	TBD	TBD	TBD	
9	"Banished"	April 14, 2025	0.2/3	1.22	TBD	TBD	TBD	TBD	
10	"The Final Drop"	April 21, 2025	0.2/3	1.44	TBD	TBD	TBD	TBD	

== Production ==
The series pickup was announced on May 13, 2024, at Fox's upfronts, with its premiere date of February 10, 2025, divulged on December 2. The competitors and teams were revealed the next month on January 14, 2025.

On May 10, 2025, Fox renewed the show for a second season, which premiered on January 26, 2026. The competitors and teams were revealed on December 16, 2025. In October 2026, Fox announced that it would establish a production hub at Kenyir Lake, Malaysia, with the intent to sell and film international adaptations of Extracted.
