= 2023–24 Canadian network television schedule =

Television schedule for the five major English commercial broadcast networks in Canada

The 2023–24 network television schedule for the five major English commercial broadcast networks in Canada covers primetime hours from September 2023 through August 2024. The schedule is followed by a list per network of returning series, new series, and series canceled after the 2022–23 television season, for Canadian, American, and other series. The schedule was affected by strikes undertaken by the Writers Guild of America (which began on May 2 and ended on September 27) and SAG-AFTRA (which began on July 14 and concluded on November 9).

Citytv was first to announce its fall schedule on June 6, 2023, followed by Global on August 22, 2023, CBC Television on August 23, 2023, and CTV on September 13, 2023. CBC was first to announce its Winter schedule on December 4, 2023, followed by Global on December 7, 2023, and CTV on December 18, 2023. Yes TV (including indieNET) and Omni Television are not included as member television stations have local flexibility over most of their schedules. CTV 2 is not included on Saturday as it normally only schedules encore programming in primetime on Saturdays.

== Legend ==
- Grey indicates encore programming.
- Blue-grey indicates news programming.
- Light green indicates sporting events/coverage.
- Light purple indicates movies.
- Red indicates Canadian content shows, which is programming that originated in Canada.
- Light yellow indicates the current schedule.

== Schedule ==
- New series to Canadian television are highlighted in **bold**.
- All times given are in Canadian Eastern Time and Pacific Time (except for some live events or specials, including most sports, which are given in Eastern Time). Subtract one hour for Central time for most programs (excluding CBC). Airtimes may vary in the Atlantic and Mountain times and do not necessarily align with U.S. stations in the Mountain time zone. Add one half-hour to Atlantic Time schedule for Newfoundland time. (See also: Effects of time zones on North American broadcasting)
- Dates (e.g., (9/13)) indicate the first month and day of a program in its regular timeslot, and also the premiere date.
- From July 26 to August 11, 2024, CBC coverage of the 2024 Summer Olympics in Paris, France live in all time zones, encompassing all of primetime those days.

=== Sunday ===
Network		7:00 p.m.	7:30 p.m.	8:00 p.m.	8:30 p.m.	9:00 p.m.	9:30 p.m.	10:00 p.m.	10:30 p.m.
CBC	Fall	Heartland (10/1)		The Great Canadian Baking Show (10/1)		SkyMed (10/1)		The National	
CBC	Winter	Bollywed (1/14)	Push (1/14)	Feature Documentaries (1/7)				The National	
Citytv	Fall	Hudson & Rex (R)		The Simpsons (10/1)	**Krapopolis** (10/1)	Bob's Burgers (10/1)	Family Guy (10/1)	Hudson & Rex (R)	
Citytv	Mid-fall	Hudson & Rex (R)		Krapopolis (11/12)	The Simpsons (11/12)	Bob's Burgers (10/1)	Family Guy (10/1)	Hudson & Rex (R)	
Citytv	Late winter	Law & Order Toronto: Criminal Intent (R)		American Idol (2/18)				Hudson & Rex (R)	
CTV	Fall	NFL overrun (continued to game completion)	NFL on CTV Live	Football Night in America	NBC Sunday Night Football				
CTV	Late winter	The Big Bang Theory (R)	The Big Bang Theory (R)	Celebrity Jeopardy! (R)		**Tracker** (2/11)		The Rookie (R)	
CTV	Spring	The Big Bang Theory (R)	The Big Bang Theory (R)	Sullivan's Crossing (4/14)		**Tracker** (2/11)		The Rookie (R)	
CTV 2	Fall	The Big Bang Theory (R)	The Big Bang Theory (R)	The Wonderful World of Disney (10/1)					
CTV 2	Winter	Corner Gas (R)	Corner Gas (R)	CTV movie					
Global	Fall	60 Minutes (9/17)		Yellowstone (9/17)		Yellowstone (9/17)		Big Brother (9/17)	
Global	Winter	60 Minutes (9/17)		Yellowstone (9/17)		Yellowstone (9/17)		Yellowstone	
Global	Late winter	60 Minutes (9/17)		The Equalizer (2/18)		Big Brother Canada (3/10)		CSI: Vegas (2/18)	

=== Monday ===
Network		7:00 p.m.	7:30 p.m.	8:00 p.m.	8:30 p.m.	9:00 p.m.	9:30 p.m.	10:00 p.m.	10:30 p.m.
CBC	Fall	Coronation Street	Family Feud Canada (9/18)	Murdoch Mysteries (10/2)		Victoria (10/2)		The National	
CBC	Winter	Coronation Street	Family Feud Canada (9/18)	Murdoch Mysteries (10/2)		Miss Scarlet and The Duke (1/1)		The National	
CBC	Late winter	Coronation Street	Family Feud Canada (9/18)	Murdoch Mysteries (10/2)		Belgravia: The Next Chapter (2/12)		The National	
Citytv	Fall	Family Feud (R)	Family Feud (R)	**FBOY Island** (10/16)		**Poker Face** (10/2)		**The Irrational** (9/25)	
Citytv	Winter	Family Feud (R)	Family Feud (R)	The Bachelor (1/22)				**The Irrational** (9/25)	
Citytv	Spring	Family Feud (R)	Family Feud (R)	The Bachelor (1/22)				**Deal or No Deal Island** (2/27)	
Citytv	Late spring	Family Feud (R)	Family Feud (R)	American Idol (4/8)				**Deal or No Deal Island** (2/27)	
CTV	Fall	Etalk	The Big Bang Theory (R)	Kitchen Nightmares (9/25)		Special Forces: World's Toughest Test (9/25)		**The Traitors Canada** (10/2)	
CTV	Winter	Etalk	Bob Hearts Abishola (2/12)	**America's Got Talent: Fantasy League** (1/1)				**Sight Unseen** (1/22)	
CTV	Spring	Etalk	Bob Hearts Abishola (2/12)	The Voice (2/26)				**Sight Unseen** (1/22)	
CTV 2	Fall	The Big Bang Theory (R)	Etalk	The Voice (9/25)				Criminal Minds (R)	
CTV 2	Winter	The Big Bang Theory (R)	Etalk	CTV Movie				Criminal Minds (R)	
CTV 2	Spring	The Big Bang Theory (R)	Etalk	MasterChef Junior (4/15)		Battle of the Generations (4/15)		Criminal Minds (R)	
Global	Fall	ET (9/11)	ET Canada (9/11)	FBI: Most Wanted (R)		**Lotería Loca** (10/2)		NCIS (R)	
Global	Mid-fall/Winter	ET (9/11)	The Goldbergs (R)	NCIS (R)		NCIS (R)		NCIS (R)	
Global	Late winter	ET (9/11)	The Goldbergs (R)	The Neighborhood (2/12)	The Goldbergs (R)	NCIS (2/12)		NCIS: Hawai'i (2/12)	

=== Tuesday ===
Network		7:00 p.m.	7:30 p.m.	8:00 p.m.	8:30 p.m.	9:00 p.m.	9:30 p.m.	10:00 p.m.	10:30 p.m.
CBC	Fall	Coronation Street	Family Feud Canada (9/19)	22 Minutes (9/19)	Still Standing (9/26)	**Animal Control** (9/19)	The New Wave of Standup (9/19)	The National	
CBC	Winter	Coronation Street	Family Feud Canada (9/19)	22 Minutes (9/19)	Son of a Critch (1/9)	**One More Time** (1/9)	Run the Burbs (1/9)	The National	
CBC	Spring	Coronation Street	Family Feud Canada (9/19)	22 Minutes (4/9)	Son of a Critch (4/9)	Comedy Festival (4/9)		The National	
Citytv	Fall	Family Feud (R)	Family Feud (R)	Dancing with the Stars (9/26)				**Found** (10/3)	
Citytv	Winter	Family Feud (R)	**Extended Family** (1/2)	Hudson & Rex (2/20)		Hudson & Rex		Hudson & Rex	
Citytv	Spring	Lopez vs Lopez (4/2)	Lopez vs Lopez (4/2)	Canada's Got Talent (3/19)		Hudson & Rex		Hudson & Rex	
CTV	Fall	Etalk	The Big Bang Theory (R)	Celebrity Wheel of Fortune (9/26)		Battle of the Generations (9/26)		Magnum P.I. (10/3)	
CTV	Winter	Etalk	Night Court (1/2)	Celebrity Jeopardy! (1/2)		**Only Murders in the Building** (1/2)			
CTV	Late winter	Alert: Missing Persons Unit (3/5)		Will Trent (2/20)		The Rookie (2/20)		The Good Doctor (2/20)	
CTV 2	Fall	The Big Bang Theory (R)	Etalk	Ride (R) (10/2)		The Voice (9/26)		Criminal Minds (R)	
CTV 2	Winter	The Big Bang Theory (R)	Etalk	Rookie Blue (R)		La Brea (1/9)		Criminal Minds (R)	
CTV 2	Spring	The Big Bang Theory (R)	Etalk	The Cleaning Lady (3/5)		The Voice (2/27)		Password (3/12)	
CTV 2	Late spring	The Big Bang Theory (R)	Etalk	The Cleaning Lady (3/5)		Weakest Link (4/2)		Password (3/12)	
Global	Fall	ET (9/12)	ET Canada (9/12)	Big Brother		Beat Shazam (9/19)		FBI	
Global	Mid-fall	ET (9/12)	The Goldbergs (R)	**NCIS: Sydney** (11/14)		NCIS (R) (11/14)		Beat Shazam (11/14)	
Global	Winter	ET (9/12)	The Goldbergs (R)	FBI (2/13)		**The Floor** (1/2)		FBI: Most Wanted (2/13)	
Global	Late winter	ET (9/12)	The Goldbergs (R)	FBI (2/13)		FBI: International (2/13)		FBI: Most Wanted (2/13)	
Global	Spring	Big Brother Canada (3/5)		FBI (2/13)		FBI: International (2/13)		FBI: Most Wanted (2/13)	

=== Wednesday ===
Network		7:00 p.m.	7:30 p.m.	8:00 p.m.	8:30 p.m.	9:00 p.m.	9:30 p.m.	10:00 p.m.	10:30 p.m.
CBC	Fall	Coronation Street	Family Feud Canada (9/20)	The Passionate Eye (9/13)		**Bones of Crows** (9/20)		The National	
CBC	Mid-fall	Coronation Street	Family Feud Canada (9/20)	**Swan Song** (11/22)		**Black Life: Untold Stories** (10/25)		The National	
CBC	Winter	Coronation Street	Family Feud Canada (9/20)	**Wild Cards** (1/10)		**D.I. Ray** (1/10)		The National	
CBC	Late winter	Coronation Street	Family Feud Canada (9/20)	Trigger Point (3/20)		**Allegiance** (2/7)		The National	
Citytv	Fall	Family Feud (R)	Family Feud (R)	Quantum Leap (10/4)		Hudson & Rex (10/4)		Chicago Fire (R)	
Citytv	Mid-fall	Family Feud (R)	Family Feud (R)	Quantum Leap (10/4)		Hudson & Rex (10/4)		Chicago P.D. (R)	
Citytv	Winter	Family Feud (R)	Family Feud (R)	Chicago Med (1/17)		Chicago Fire (1/17)		Chicago P.D. (1/17)	
Citytv	Spring	Family Feud (R)	Family Guy (3/6)	Chicago Med (1/17)		Chicago Fire (1/17)		Chicago P.D. (1/17)	
CTV	Fall	**Snake Oil** (9/27)		The Masked Singer (9/27)		Children Ruin Everything (9/27)	The Amazing Race (9/27)		
CTV	Winter	Etalk	The Big Bang Theory (R)	The Conners (2/7)	Not Dead Yet (2/7)	Battle of the Generations		Celebrity Jeopardy! (R)	
CTV	Spring	Etalk	The Conners	The Masked Singer (3/6)		Not Dead Yet	The Amazing Race (3/13)		
CTV 2	Fall	The Big Bang Theory (R)	Etalk	Sullivan's Crossing (R)		The Spencer Sisters (R)		The $100,000 Pyramid (9/27)	
Global	Fall	ET (9/13)	ET Canada (9/13)	Survivor (9/27)			Ghosts (R)	**Robyn Hood** (9/27)	
Global	Mid-fall	ET (9/13)	The Goldbergs (R)	Survivor (9/27)			Ghosts (R)	**Robyn Hood** (9/27)	
Global	Winter	ET (9/13)	The Goldbergs (R)	I Can See Your Voice (1/3)		**We Are Family** (1/3)		Raid the Cage (1/3)	
Global	Spring	ET (9/13)	The Goldbergs (R)	Survivor (2/28)			Big Brother Canada (3/6)		Abbott Elementary (2/7)

=== Thursday ===
Network		7:00 p.m.	7:30 p.m.	8:00 p.m.	8:30 p.m.	9:00 p.m.	9:30 p.m.	10:00 p.m.	10:30 p.m.
CBC	Fall	Coronation Street	Family Feud Canada (9/21)	Dragons' Den (9/21)		**Crime Scene Kitchen** (9/14)		The National	
CBC	Mid-fall	Coronation Street	Family Feud Canada (9/21)	Dragons' Den (9/21)		**BlackBerry** (11/9)		The National	
CBC	Winter	Coronation Street	Family Feud Canada (9/21)	Dragons' Den (9/21)		The Nature of Things (1/4)		The National	
CBC	Mid-winter	Coronation Street	Family Feud Canada (9/21)	**The Great Canadian Pottery Throw Down** (2/8)		The Nature of Things (1/4)		The National	
CBC	Spring	Coronation Street	Family Feud Canada (9/21)	Dragons' Den (4/11)		Comedy Festival (4/18)		The National	
Citytv	Fall	Hell's Kitchen (9/28)		**The Golden Bachelor** (9/28)		Bachelor in Paradise (9/28)			
Citytv	Winter	Family Feud (R)	Family Feud (R)	Law & Order (1/18)		Law & Order: Special Victims Unit (1/18)		Law & Order: Organized Crime (1/18)	
Citytv	Spring	Law & Order (2/22)		**Law & Order Toronto: Criminal Intent** (2/22)		Law & Order: Special Victims Unit (1/18)		Law & Order: Organized Crime (1/18)	
CTV	Fall	Etalk	The Big Bang Theory (R)	Celebrity Jeopardy! (9/28)		LEGO Masters (9/28)		The Challenge: USA	
CTV	Mid-fall	Etalk	The Big Bang Theory (R)	Celebrity Jeopardy! (9/28)		LEGO Masters (9/28)		The Rookie (R)	
CTV	Later winter	Etalk	Young Sheldon (2/15)	Next Level Chef (2/1)		Grey's Anatomy (3/14)		Station 19 (3/14)	
CTV 2	Fall	The Big Bang Theory (R) (9/14)	Thursday Night Football (9/14)						
CTV 2	Winter	The Big Bang Theory (R) (9/14)	Etalk	Almost Paradise (R)		**Farmer Wants a Wife** (2/1)		Criminal Minds (R)	
CTV 2	Spring	The Big Bang Theory (R) (9/14)	Etalk	**Patti Stanger: The Matchmaker** (4/11)		**Farmer Wants a Wife** (2/1)		Criminal Minds (R)	
Global	Fall	ET (9/14)	ET Canada (9/14)	**Buddy Games** (9/14)		Big Brother		SEAL Team (11/2)	
Global	Mid-fall	ET (9/14)	The Goldbergs (R)	The Neighborhood (R)	Ghosts (R)	CSI: Vegas (R)		SEAL Team (11/2)	
Global	Winter	ET (9/14)	The Goldbergs (R)	The Goldbergs (R)	Ghosts (R)	SEAL Team		SEAL Team (11/2)	
Global	Late winter	ET (9/14)	The Goldbergs (R)	The Goldbergs (R)	Ghosts (2/15)	So Help Me Todd (2/15)		**Elsbeth** (2/29)	
Global	Spring	ET (9/14)	Ghosts (3/14)	9-1-1 (3/14)		So Help Me Todd (2/15)		**Elsbeth** (2/29)	

=== Friday ===
Network		7:00 p.m.	7:30 p.m.	8:00 p.m.	8:30 p.m.	9:00 p.m.	9:30 p.m.	10:00 p.m.	10:30 p.m.
CBC	Fall	Coronation Street	Coronation Street	Marketplace (10/13)	Planet Wonder (10/6)	The Fifth Estate (10/20)		The National (9/16)	
CBC	Winter	Coronation Street	Coronation Street	Marketplace (10/13)	**About That with Andrew Chang** (1/5)	The Fifth Estate (10/20)		The National (9/16)	
Citytv	Fall	Family Feud (R)	Family Feud (R)	Hudson & Rex (R)		Dateline (9/29)			
CTV	Fall	Etalk	The Big Bang Theory (R)	Shark Tank (9/29)		Transplant (10/6)		W5 (10/6)	
CTV	Winter	Etalk	The Big Bang Theory (R)	Shark Tank (9/29)		The Big Bang Theory (R)	The Big Bang Theory (R)	Little Bird (R)	
CTV	Later winter	Etalk	The Big Bang Theory (R)	Shark Tank (9/29)		The Big Bang Theory (R)	The Big Bang Theory (R)	Blue Bloods (2/16)	
CTV 2	Fall/Winter	The Big Bang Theory (R)	Etalk	CTV Movie					
Global	Fall	ET (9/15)	ET Canada (9/15)	The Wall (11/3)		**Raid the Cage** (10/13)		Crime Beat (10/13)	
Global	Mid-fall	ET (9/15)	The Goldbergs (R)	The Wall (11/3)		**Raid the Cage** (10/13)		Crime Beat (10/13)	
Global	Winter	ET (9/15)	The Goldbergs (R)	S.W.A.T. (2/18)		Fire Country (2/18)		Crime Beat (10/13)	

=== Saturday ===
Network		7:00 p.m.	7:30 p.m.	8:00 p.m.	8:30 p.m.	9:00 p.m.	9:30 p.m.	10:00 p.m.	10:30 p.m.
CBC		Hockey Night in Canada (10/15)							
Citytv		Hockey Night in Canada (10/15)						Hudson & Rex (R)	
CTV	Fall	The Big Bang Theory (R)	The Big Bang Theory (R)	CTV Movie					
CTV	Winter	W5		CTV Movie				Sight Unseen (R)	
Global	Fall	The New Reality (9/30)	**Crime Beat: Most Wanted** (9/30)	Robyn Hood (R)		Departure (R)		48 Hours (9/16)	
Global	Late fall	The New Reality (9/30)	**Crime Beat: Most Wanted** (9/30)	Private Eyes (R)		Departure (R)		48 Hours (9/16)	
Global	Winter	Border Security: America's Front Line (R)	Border Security: America's Front Line (R)	Private Eyes (R)		Salvage Kings (R)		Top Chef Canada (R)	

== By network ==
=== CBC ===
Returning series:

- 22 Minutes
- Bollywed
- Canada's Ultimate Challenge
- Family Feud Canada
- The Fifth Estate
- Heartland
- Hockey Night in Canada
- Marketplace
- Moonshine
- Murdoch Mysteries
- The National
- The Nature of Things
- The New Wave of Standup
- The Passionate Eye
- Race Against the Tide
- Run the Burbs
- SkyMed
- Son of a Critch
- Sort Of
- Stuff the British Stole
- Victoria

New series:

- Allegiance
- Animal Control
- BlackBerry
- Bones of Crows
- One More Time
- Wild Cards

Not returning from 2022–23:

- Comedy Night with Rick Mercer
- Diggstown
- Essex County
- Fakes
- The North Water
- Plan B (returning in 2024-25)
- Pretty Hard Cases
- Ridley Road
- Stay Tooned
- Strays
- Summit '72
- Travel Man: 48 Hours In...
- War of the Worlds
- Workin' Moms

=== Citytv ===
Returning series:

- America's Got Talent
- American Idol
- The Bachelor
- Bachelor in Paradise
- Bachelor in Paradise Canada
- Bob's Burgers (shared with CHCH, on-demand with Star)
- Canada's Got Talent
- Chicago Fire
- Chicago Med
- Chicago P.D.
- Dateline NBC (Friday broadcasts only)
- Dancing with the Stars (shared with Disney+)
- Family Guy (shared with CHCH, on-demand with Star)
- Hell's Kitchen
- Hockey Night in Canada
- Hudson & Rex
- Jimmy Kimmel Live (late night)
- The Jennifer Hudson Show (daytime)
- Law & Order
- Lopez vs Lopez
- Law & Order: Organized Crime
- Law & Order: Special Victims Unit
- Poker Face (Citytv+)
- Quantum Leap
- The Simpsons (shared with CHCH, on-demand with Disney+)

New series:

- Deal or No Deal Island
- Extended Family
- FBOY Island
- Found
- Krapopolis (shared with CHCH)
- The Golden Bachelor
- Grimsburg (shared with CHCH)
- The Irrational
- Law & Order Toronto: Criminal Intent

Not returning from 2022–23:

- American Auto
- Grand Crew
- Young Rock

=== CTV/CTV 2 ===
Returning series

- The $100,000 Pyramid
- 9-1-1: Lone Star
- Alert: Missing Persons Unit
- The Amazing Race
- The Amazing Race Canada
- Battle of the Generations
- Blue Bloods
- Bob Hearts Abishola
- Celebrity Jeopardy!
- Celebrity Wheel of Fortune
- Children Ruin Everything
- The Cleaning Lady
- The Conners
- Etalk
- The Good Doctor
- Grey's Anatomy
- Farming for Love
- Kitchen Nightmares
- La Brea
- Lego Masters
- Magnum P.I.
- The Masked Singer
- MasterChef Junior
- Monday Night Football
- Next Level Chef
- Night Court
- Not Dead Yet
- Password
- The Rookie
- Shark Tank
- Station 19
- Sullivan's Crossing
- Sunday Night Football
- Thursday Night Football
- Transplant
- The Voice
- W5
- Young Sheldon
- Will Trent

New series

- America's Got Talent: Fantasy League
- Farmer Wants a Wife
- Patti Stanger: The Matchmaker
- Sight Unseen
- Snake Oil
- Special Forces: World's Toughest Test
- Tracker
- The Traitors Canada

Not returning from 2022–23:

- Alaska Daily
- Big Sky
- Call Me Kat
- The Company You Keep
- East New York
- Evolving Vegan
- The Goldbergs
- The Resident
- Shelved
- True Lies
- The Winchesters

=== Global ===
Returning series:

- 9-1-1
- Accused
- 48 Hours
- 60 Minutes
- Abbott Elementary
- Big Brother
- Big Brother Canada
- Crime Beat
- CSI: Vegas
- Departure
- The Equalizer
- ET
- ET Canada
- Fire Country
- Family Law
- FBI
- FBI: International
- FBI: Most Wanted
- Ghosts
- I Can See Your Voice
- NCIS
- NCIS: Hawai'i
- The Neighborhood
- Survivor
- So Help Me Todd
- S.W.A.T.

New series:

- Buddy Games
- Crime Beat: Most Wanted
- Elsbeth
- The Floor
- Lotería Loca
- Raid the Cage
- Robyn Hood
- We Are Family

Not returning from 2022–23:

- The Blacklist
- Fantasy Island
- Monarch
- NCIS: Los Angeles
- New Amsterdam
- The Real Love Boat
- Superfan

== Renewals and cancellations ==
=== Renewals ===
==== CBC ====
- SkyMed—Renewed for a third season on March 20, 2024.
- Heartland—Renewed for an eighteenth season on May 13, 2024.
- Murdoch Mysteries—Renewed for an eighteenth season on May 23, 2024.
- Son of a Critch—Renewed for a fourth season on May 23, 2024.
- Wild Cards—Renewed for a second season on May 23, 2024.

==== CTV/CTV 2 ====
- The Amazing Race Canada—Renewed for an eleventh season on September 11, 2024.

=== Cancellations/series endings ===
==== CBC ====
- Run the Burbs—Canceled on April 25, 2024, after three seasons. The series concluded on April 2, 2024.
- Sort Of—It was announced on October 5, 2023, that season three would be the final season. The series concluded on December 8, 2023.
- One More Time— Show creator and star D.J. Demers confirmed the show's cancellation after one season on his Instagram.

==== CTV/CTV 2 ====
- The Spencer Sisters—Canceled on May 16 2024.
- Transplant—It was announced on September 13, 2023, that season four would be the final season. The series concluded on January 19, 2024.

==== Global ====
- ET Canada—On September 27, 2023, Global announced the cancellation of the series after 19 seasons due to the 2023 SAG-AFTRA strike. The final episode aired on October 6, 2023.

== See also ==
- 2023–24 United States network television schedule
