= 2022–23 Canadian network television schedule =

Television schedule for the five major English commercial broadcast networks in Canada

The 2022–23 network television schedule for the five major English commercial broadcast networks in Canada covers primetime hours from September 2022 through August 2023. The schedule is followed by a list per network of returning series, new series, and series canceled after the 2021–22 television season, for Canadian, American, and other series. CBC was first to announce its fall schedule on June 1, 2022, followed by Citytv on June 7, 2022, Global on June 8, 2022, and CTV and CTV 2 on June 9, 2022. CBC was first to announce its Winter schedule on November 30, 2022, Global on December 8, 2022, Citytv on December 14, 2022, and CTV on December 16, 2022. Global was first to announce its Summer schedule on May 1, 2023. Yes TV (including indieNET) and Omni Television are not included as member television stations have local flexibility over most of their schedules. CTV 2 is not included on Saturday as it normally only schedules encore programming in primetime on Saturdays.

== Legend ==
- Grey indicates encore programming.
- Blue-grey indicates news programming.
- Light green indicates sporting events/coverage.
- Light purple indicates movies.
- Red indicates Canadian content shows, which is programming that originated in Canada.
- Light yellow indicates the current schedule.

== Schedule ==
- New series to Canadian television are highlighted in **bold**.
- All times given are in Canadian Eastern Time and Pacific Time (except for some live events or specials, including most sports, which are given in Eastern Time). Subtract one hour for Central time for most programs (excluding CBC). Airtimes may vary in the Atlantic and Mountain times and do not necessarily align with U.S. stations in the Mountain time zone. Add one half-hour to Atlantic Time schedule for Newfoundland time. (See also: Effects of time zones on North American broadcasting)
- Dates (e.g., (9/13)) indicate the first month and day of a program in its regular timeslot, not necessarily the premiere date.

=== Sunday ===
Network		7:00 p.m.	7:30 p.m.	8:00 p.m.	8:30 p.m.	9:00 p.m.	9:30 p.m.	10:00 p.m.	10:30 p.m.
CBC	Fall	Heartland (10/2)		The Great Canadian Baking Show (10/2)		Moonshine (10/2)		The National	
CBC	Winter	Heartland (10/2)		CBC Docs (1/8)				The National	
CBC	Spring	Best in Miniature (2/19)		CBC Docs (3/19)		Essex County (3/19)		The National	
CBC	Late spring	Heartland (R)		The Great Canadian Baking Show (R)		Dragons' Den (R)		The National	
CBC	Summer	The Great British Baking Show (7/16)			Race Against the Tide (7/16)	Moonshine (7/16)		The National	
Citytv	Fall	Hudson & Rex (R) (9/25)		Hudson & Rex (9/25)		Romantic Movies			
Citytv	Winter	Mom (R)	Mom (R)	American Idol (2/19)				Mom (R)	Mom (R)
Citytv	Spring	Canada's Got Talent (R) (3/26)		American Idol (2/19)				Mom (R)	Mom (R)
Citytv	Summer	The Price Is Right (R)		Hudson & Rex (R)		Hudson & Rex (R)		Hudson & Rex (R)	
Citytv	Mid-summer	The Chase (R)		**The Prank Panel** (7/9)	**The Prank Panel** (7/9)	Celebrity Family Feud (7/9)		Hudson & Rex (R)	
CTV	Fall	NFL overrun (continued to game completion)	NFL on CTV Live	**Celebrity Jeopardy!** (9/25)		**East New York** (10/2)		The Rookie (9/25)	
CTV	Winter	The Big Bang Theory (R)	The Big Bang Theory (R)	East New York		Magnum P.I. (2/19)		**The Company You Keep** (2/26)	
CTV	Spring	**Sullivan's Crossing** (3/19)		East New York		Magnum P.I. (2/19)		**The Company You Keep** (2/26)	
CTV	Summer	**Farming for Love**		CTV Movie					
CTV	Mid-summer	**Farming for Love**		The Amazing Race Canada (R)				The $100,000 Pyramid (7/9)	
CTV 2	Fall	The Big Bang Theory (R)	The Big Bang Theory (R)	Football Night in America	NBC Sunday Night Football				
CTV 2	Winter/Spring	Corner Gas (R)	Corner Gas (R)	CTV Movie					
CTV 2	Summer	Holmes Family Effect (R)		Highway Thru Hell (R)		Mighty Ships (R)		A Cut Above (R)	
CTV 2	Mid-summer	Evolving Vegan (R)		Highway Thru Hell (R)		Mighty Ships (R)		A Cut Above (R)	
Global	Fall	60 Minutes (10/2)		The Equalizer (10/9)		**Monarch** (9/25)		NCIS: Los Angeles (10/9)	
Global	Later winter/Spring	60 Minutes (10/2)		The Equalizer (10/9)		The Blacklist (2/26)		NCIS: Los Angeles (10/9)	
Global	Summer	60 Minutes (R)		FBI: International (R)		Ghosts (R)	The Neighborhood (R)	NCIS: Los Angeles (R)	
Global	Mid-summer	60 Minutes (R)		Tough as Nails (7/2)		The Equalizer (R)		Crime Beat (R)	
Global	Late summer	60 Minutes (R)		Big Brother (8/2)		The Equalizer (R)		Crime Beat (R)	

=== Monday ===
Network		7:00 p.m.	7:30 p.m.	8:00 p.m.	8:30 p.m.	9:00 p.m.	9:30 p.m.	10:00 p.m.	10:30 p.m.
CBC	Fall	Coronation Street	Family Feud Canada (9/12)	Murdoch Mysteries (9/12)		**The North Water** (9/12)		The National (9/12)	
CBC	Late fall	Coronation Street	Family Feud Canada (9/12)	Murdoch Mysteries (9/12)		**Ridley Road** (10/24)		The National (9/12)	
CBC	Winter	Coronation Street	Family Feud Canada (9/12)	Murdoch Mysteries (9/12)		**Around the World in 80 Days** (1/2)		The National (9/12)	
CBC	Late winter/Spring	Coronation Street	Family Feud Canada (9/12)	Murdoch Mysteries (9/12)		**Plan B** (2/27)		The National (9/12)	
CBC	Late spring	Coronation Street	Strays (R)	Murdoch Mysteries (R)		Diggstown (R)		The National (9/12)	
CBC	Summer	Coronation Street	Coronation Street	Murdoch Mysteries (R)		The Porter (R)		The National (9/12)	
Citytv	Fall	The Price Is Right (R) (9/13)		Bachelor in Paradise (10/3)				**Quantum Leap** (9/19)	
Citytv	Winter	The Price Is Right (R) (9/13)		The Bachelor (1/23)				**Quantum Leap** (9/19)	
Citytv	Spring	The Price Is Right (R) (9/13)		American Idol (4/3)				Hudson & Rex (R) (4/10)	
Citytv	Summer	The Price Is Right (R) (9/13)		Bachelor in Paradise Canada (5/8)				Hudson & Rex (R) (4/10)	
Citytv	Mid-summer	The Price Is Right (R) (9/13)		Claim to Fame (6/26)		The Bachelorette (6/26)			
Citytv	Late Summer	The Price Is Right (R) (9/13)		The Bachelorette (7/24)				Claim to Fame (7/24)	
CTV	Fall	Etalk (9/19)	The Big Bang Theory (R) (9/19)	Children Ruin Everything (9/19)	Bob Hearts Abishola (9/19)	The Cleaning Lady (9/19)		The Good Doctor (10/3)	
CTV	Winter	Etalk (9/19)	The Big Bang Theory (R) (9/19)	Children Ruin Everything (9/19)	Bob Hearts Abishola (9/19)	**Alert: Missing Persons Unit** (1/9)		The Good Doctor (10/3)	
CTV	Spring	Etalk (9/19)	The Big Bang Theory (R) (9/19)	The Big Bang Theory (R)	Bob Hearts Abishola (9/19)	Night Court (3/6)	**Shelved** (3/6)	The Good Doctor (10/3)	
CTV	Late spring	Etalk (9/19)	Bob Hearts Abishola (5/8)	The Voice (5/8)				Thunder Bay (R) (5/8)	
CTV	Summer	Etalk (9/19)	The Big Bang Theory (R)	American Ninja Warrior		**Battle of the Generations** (6/19)		Weakest Link	
CTV 2	Fall	The Big Bang Theory (R) (9/19)	Etalk (9/19)	The Voice (9/19)				Superman & Lois (9/19)	
CTV 2	Winter	The Big Bang Theory (R) (9/19)	Etalk (9/19)	**America's Got Talent: All-Stars** (1/2)				**Almost Paradise** (1/2)	
CTV 2	Spring	The Big Bang Theory (R) (9/19)	Etalk (9/19)	The Voice (3/6)				**The Winchesters** (3/13)	
CTV 2	Late spring	The Big Bang Theory (R) (9/19)	Etalk (9/19)	**Jeopardy! Masters** (5/8)		**Thunder Bay** (5/8)		**The Winchesters** (3/13)	
CTV 2	Summer	The Big Bang Theory (R) (9/19)	Etalk (9/19)	Farming for Love (R)		Cross Country Cake Off (R)		Criminal Minds (R)	
CTV 2	Mid-summer	The Big Bang Theory (R) (9/19)	Etalk (9/19)	Farming for Love (R)		Children Ruin Everything (R)	Children Ruin Everything (R)	Criminal Minds (R)	
CTV 2	Late summer	The Big Bang Theory (R) (9/19)	Etalk (9/19)	CTV Movie				Criminal Minds (R)	
Global	Fall	ET (9/12)	ET Canada (9/12)	9-1-1 (9/19)		NCIS (9/19)		NCIS: Hawaiʻi (9/19)	
Global	Winter	ET (9/12)	ET Canada (9/12)	Fantasy Island (1/2)		NCIS (9/19)		NCIS: Hawaiʻi (9/19)	
Global	Spring	The Neighborhood (3/6)	ET Canada (9/12)	9-1-1 (3/6)		NCIS (9/19)		NCIS: Hawaiʻi (9/19)	
Global	Summer	ET	ET Canada (9/12)	Family Law (5/22)		The Wall		NCIS: Hawaiʻi (R)	
Global	Late summer	ET	ET Canada (9/12)	Departure (8/7)		NCIS (R)		NCIS: Hawaiʻi (R)	

=== Tuesday ===
Network		7:00 p.m.	7:30 p.m.	8:00 p.m.	8:30 p.m.	9:00 p.m.	9:30 p.m.	10:00 p.m.	10:30 p.m.
CBC	Fall	Coronation Street	Family Feud Canada (9/13)	22 Minutes (9/13)	Strays (9/13)	**Comedy Night with Rick Mercer** (9/13)		The National (9/13)	
CBC	Late fall	Coronation Street	Family Feud Canada (9/13)	22 Minutes (9/13)	Strays (9/13)	Sort Of (11/15)	Sort Of (11/15)	The National (9/13)	
CBC	Winter	Coronation Street	Family Feud Canada (9/13)	22 Minutes (9/13)	Son of a Critch (1/3)	Workin' Moms (1/3)	Catastrophe (1/3)	The National (9/13)	
CBC	Late winter/Spring	Coronation Street	Family Feud Canada (9/13)	22 Minutes (9/13)	Son of a Critch (1/3)	Workin' Moms (1/3)	Casual (2/14)	The National (9/13)	
CBC	Late spring	Coronation Street	Strays (R)	Still Standing (R)	Still Standing (R)	Halifax Comedy Festival (R)		The National (9/13)	
CBC	Summer	Coronation Street	Coronation Street	Son of a Critch (R)	Strays (R)	Workin' Moms (R)	Sort Of (R)	The National (9/13)	
Citytv	Fall	The Price Is Right (R) (9/13)		Bachelor in Paradise (9/27)				Mom (R) (9/27)	Mom (R) (9/27)
Citytv	Winter	Family Feud (R)	American Auto (1/24)	Hudson & Rex (1/17)		**Wong & Winchester** (1/17)		Mom (R) (9/27)	Mom (R) (9/27)
Citytv	Spring	Family Feud (R)	American Auto (1/24)	Canada's Got Talent (3/21)		Hudson & Rex (3/21)		That's My Jam (3/7)	
Citytv	Summer	The Price Is Right (R)		America's Got Talent				Mom (R)	Mom (R)
CTV	Fall	Etalk (9/20)	The Big Bang Theory (R) (9/20)	The Resident (9/20)		La Brea (9/27)		**The Rookie: Feds** (9/27)	
CTV	Winter/Spring	The Rookie (1/3)		9-1-1: Lone Star (1/24)		The Rookie: Feds (1/3)		**Will Trent** (1/3)	
CTV	Summer	Etalk	The Big Bang Theory (R)	Celebrity Wheel of Fortune (R)		The Amazing Race Canada (7/4)		The Big Bang Theory (R)	The Big Bang Theory (R)
CTV 2	Fall	The Big Bang Theory (R) (9/20)	Etalk (9/20)	The Voice (9/20)		Celebrity Wheel of Fortune (9/27)		In the Dark (9/20)	
CTV 2	Winter	The Big Bang Theory (R) (9/20)	Etalk (9/20)	Modern Family (R)	Modern Family (R)	Modern Family (R)	Modern Family (R)	Criminal Minds (R)	
CTV 2	Spring	The Big Bang Theory (R) (9/20)	Etalk (9/20)	The Voice (3/7)		Modern Family (R)	Modern Family (R)	Criminal Minds (R)	
CTV 2	Late spring	The Big Bang Theory (R) (9/20)	Etalk (9/20)	**Jeopardy! Masters** (5/9)		Modern Family (R)	Modern Family (R)	Criminal Minds (R)	
CTV 2	Summer	The Big Bang Theory (R) (9/20)	Etalk (9/20)	Corner Gas Animated (R)	Corner Gas Animated (R)	CTV Movie			
Global	Fall	FBI: Most Wanted (9/20)		FBI (9/20)		FBI: International (9/20)		New Amsterdam (9/20)	
Global	Winter	ET (1/10)	ET Canada (1/10)	FBI (9/20)		FBI: International (9/20)		FBI: Most Wanted (1/10)	
Global	Spring	Big Brother Canada (3/14)		FBI (9/20)		FBI: International (9/20)		FBI: Most Wanted (1/10)	
Global	Late spring	ET	ET Canada	FBI (9/20)		FBI: International (9/20)		FBI: Most Wanted (1/10)	

=== Wednesday ===
Network		7:00 p.m.	7:30 p.m.	8:00 p.m.	8:30 p.m.	9:00 p.m.	9:30 p.m.	10:00 p.m.	10:30 p.m.
CBC	Fall	Coronation Street (9/14)	Family Feud Canada (9/14)	**Summit '72** (9/14)		War of the Worlds (9/14)		The National (9/14)	
CBC	Late fall	Coronation Street (9/14)	Family Feud Canada (9/14)	Diggstown (10/12)		War of the Worlds (9/14)		The National (9/14)	
CBC	Winter/Spring	Coronation Street (9/14)	Family Feud Canada (9/14)	Still Standing (1/4)	Run the Burbs (1/4)	Pretty Hard Cases (1/4)		The National (9/14)	
CBC	Late spring	Coronation Street (9/14)	Son of a Critch (R)	Coroner (R)		Coroner (R)		The National (9/14)	
CBC	Summer	Coronation Street (9/14)	Son of a Critch (R)	CBC Movie				The National (9/14)	
CBC	Mid-summer	Coronation Street (9/14)	Just for Laughs Gags (R)	Pretty Hard Cases (R)		SkyMed (R)		The National (9/14)	
Citytv	Fall/Winter/Spring	The Price Is Right (R) (9/14)		Chicago Med (9/21)		Chicago Fire (9/21)		Chicago P.D. (9/21)	
Citytv	Summer	The Price Is Right (R) (9/14)		Judge Steve Harvey		Hudson & Rex (R)		Mom (R)	Mom (R)
CTV	Fall	Etalk (9/21)	The Conners (9/21)	The Masked Singer (9/21)		Lego Masters (9/21)		The Amazing Race (9/21)	
CTV	Late fall	Etalk (9/21)	The Conners (9/21)	The Masked Singer (9/21)		The Amazing Race		Lego Masters	
CTV	Winter	Etalk (9/21)	The Big Bang Theory (R)	The Conners (1/11)	**Night Court** (1/25)	**Lingo** (1/11)		The Resident (1/4)	
CTV	Late winter	Etalk (9/21)	The Conners (2/15)	The Masked Singer (2/15)		**Lingo** (1/11)		La Brea (2/1)	
CTV	Spring	Etalk (9/21)	The Conners (2/15)	The Masked Singer (2/15)		Weakest Link (4/12)		**True Lies** (3/1)	
CTV	Summer	Etalk (9/21)	The Big Bang Theory (R)	MasterChef		**Gordon Ramsay's Food Stars**		The Big Bang Theory (R)	The Big Bang Theory (R)
CTV 2	Fall	The Big Bang Theory (R) (9/21)	Etalk (9/21)	Young Sheldon (R) (9/21)	The Goldbergs (9/21)	Kung Fu (10/5)		Big Sky (9/21)	
CTV 2	Winter/Spring	The Big Bang Theory (R) (9/21)	Etalk (9/21)	Young Sheldon (R) (9/21)	The Goldbergs (9/21)	Young Sheldon (R)	**Not Dead Yet** (2/8)	Kung Fu (2/8)	
CTV 2	Late spring	The Big Bang Theory (R) (9/21)	Etalk (9/21)	**Jeopardy! Masters** (5/10)		Modern Family (R) (5/10)	Modern Family (R) (5/10)	Corner Gas (R) (5/10)	Corner Gas (R) (5/10)
CTV 2	Summer	The Big Bang Theory (R) (9/21)	Etalk (9/21)	The Goldbergs (R)	The Goldbergs (R)	The Wonder Years	Shelved (R)	Flashpoint (R)	
Global	Fall	ET (9/14)	ET Canada (9/14)	Survivor (9/21)		Abbott Elementary (10/5)	Home Economics (9/28)	**The Real Love Boat** (10/5)	
Global	Winter	ET (9/14)	ET Canada (9/14)	**Accused** (1/22)		Abbott Elementary (10/5)	Home Economics (9/28)	Tough as Nails (1/11)	
Global	Spring	ET (9/14)	ET Canada (9/14)	Survivor (3/1)		Big Brother Canada (3/8)		Accused (3/1)	
Global	Summer	ET (9/14)	ET Canada (9/14)	**LA Fire and Rescue** (6/21)		Top Chef Canada (R)		Family Law (R)	
Global	Late summer	ET (9/14)	ET Canada (9/14)	Big Brother (8/2)		**Superfan** (8/9)		Top Chef Canada (R)	

=== Thursday ===
Network		7:00 p.m.	7:30 p.m.	8:00 p.m.	8:30 p.m.	9:00 p.m.	9:30 p.m.	10:00 p.m.	10:30 p.m.
CBC	Fall	Coronation Street (9/15)	Family Feud Canada (9/15)	Dragons' Den (9/15)		The Fifth Estate (9/29)		The National (9/15)	
CBC	Winter	Coronation Street (9/15)	Family Feud Canada (9/15)	**Bollywed** (1/12)		The Fifth Estate (9/29)		The National (9/15)	
CBC	Late winter	Coronation Street (9/15)	Family Feud Canada (9/15)	**Canada's Ultimate Challenge** (2/16)		**Trigger Point** (2/16)		The National (9/15)	
CBC	Spring	Coronation Street (9/15)	Family Feud Canada (9/15)	**Canada's Ultimate Challenge** (2/16)		The Just for Laughs Galas (3/30)		The National (9/15)	
CBC	Late spring	Coronation Street (9/15)	Son of a Critch (R)	The Nature of Things (R)		Just for Laughs (R)		The National (9/15)	
CBC	Summer	Coronation Street (9/15)	Just for Laughs Gags (R)	Dragons' Den (6/22)		Trigger Point (R)		The National (9/15)	
Citytv	Fall/Winter	Hell's Kitchen (9/29)		Law & Order (9/22)		Law & Order: Special Victims Unit (9/22)		Law & Order: Organized Crime (9/22)	
Citytv	Spring	The Price Is Right (R)		Law & Order (9/22)		Law & Order: Special Victims Unit (9/22)		Law & Order: Organized Crime (9/22)	
Citytv	Summer	The Price Is Right (R)		The Chase (R)		Law & Order: Special Victims Unit (R)		Mom (R)	Mom (R)
Citytv	Mid-summer	The Price Is Right (R)		The Chase		Law & Order: Special Victims Unit (R)		Mom (R)	Mom (R)
CTV	Fall	Call Me Kat (10/6)	Young Sheldon (10/6)	Station 19 (10/6)		Grey's Anatomy (10/6)		**Alaska Daily** (10/6)	
CTV	Winter	Call Me Kat (10/6)	Young Sheldon (10/6)	Celebrity Jeopardy! (1/5)		**The Parent Test** (1/5)		The Big Bang Theory (R)	The Big Bang Theory (R)
CTV	Spring	Call Me Kat (10/6)	Young Sheldon (10/6)	Station 19 (2/23)		Grey's Anatomy (2/23)		**Alaska Daily** (3/2)	
CTV	Summer	Etalk	The Big Bang Theory (R)	Young Sheldon (R)	Night Court (R)	Children Ruin Everything (R)	Bob Hearts Abishola (R)	The Big Bang Theory (R)	The Big Bang Theory (R)
CTV	Mid-summer	Etalk	The Big Bang Theory (R)	Generation Gap		Children Ruin Everything (R)	Children Ruin Everything (R)	The Big Bang Theory (R)	The Big Bang Theory (R)
CTV 2	Fall	The Big Bang Theory (R) (9/15)	Thursday Night Football (9/15)						
CTV 2	Winter	The Big Bang Theory (R) (9/15)	Etalk	Next Level Chef (2/16)		Rookie Blue		Rookie Blue	
CTV 2	Spring	The Big Bang Theory (R) (9/15)	Etalk	Next Level Chef (2/16)		**Evolving Vegan** (3/30)		Rookie Blue	
CTV 2	Summer	The Big Bang Theory (R) (9/15)	Etalk	Walker (R)		Rookie Blue		Rookie Blue	
Global	Fall/Winter	ET (9/15)	ET Canada (9/15)	The Neighborhood (9/29)	Ghosts (9/29)	**So Help Me Todd** (9/29)		CSI: Vegas (9/29)	
Global	Spring	Big Brother Canada (3/9)		Abbott Elementary (3/9)	Ghosts (9/29)	**So Help Me Todd** (9/29)		CSI: Vegas (9/29)	
Global	Summer	ET	ET Canada	The Blacklist		So Help Me Todd (R)		CSI: Vegas (R)	
Global	Mid-summer	ET	ET Canada	The Neighborhood (R)	Ghosts (R)	So Help Me Todd (R)		Border Security: Canada's Front Line (R)	Border Security: Canada's Front Line (R)

=== Friday ===
Network		7:00 p.m.	7:30 p.m.	8:00 p.m.	8:30 p.m.	9:00 p.m.	9:30 p.m.	10:00 p.m.	10:30 p.m.
CBC	Fall	Coronation Street (9/16)	Coronation Street (9/16)	Marketplace (10/7)	Travel Man (10/14)	The Passionate Eye (9/16)		The National (9/16)	
CBC	Winter	Coronation Street (9/16)	Coronation Street (9/16)	Marketplace (10/7)	**Stuff the British Stole** (1/6)	The Nature of Things		The National (9/16)	
CBC	Late winter/Spring	Coronation Street (9/16)	Coronation Street (9/16)	Marketplace (10/7)	**Push** (2/24)	The Nature of Things		The National (9/16)	
CBC	Late spring	Coronation Street (9/16)	Coronation Street (9/16)	Arctic Vets (R)	Arctic Vets (R)	Winnipeg Comedy Festival (R)		The National (9/16)	
CBC	Summer	Coronation Street (9/16)	Just for Laughs Gags (R)	Still Standing (R)	Run the Burbs (R)	The New Wave of Standup (R)	The New Wave of Standup (R)	The National (9/16)	
Citytv	Fall	The Price Is Right (R) (9/9)		Capital One College Bowl (9/9)		Dateline NBC (9/16)			
Citytv	Late fall/Winter	The Price Is Right (R) (9/9)		**Lopez vs Lopez** (11/4)	Young Rock (11/4)	Dateline NBC (9/16)			
Citytv	Spring	The Price Is Right (R) (9/9)		**Lopez vs Lopez** (11/4)	Grand Crew (3/3)	Dateline NBC (9/16)			
Citytv	Summer	The Price Is Right (R) (9/9)		Hudson & Rex (R)		Dateline NBC (9/16)			
CTV	Fall	Etalk (9/23)	The Big Bang Theory (R) (9/23)	Shark Tank (9/23)		Transplant (9/23)		Blue Bloods (10/7)	
CTV	Winter/Spring	Etalk (9/23)	The Big Bang Theory (R) (9/23)	Shark Tank (9/23)		**The Spencer Sisters** (2/10)		Blue Bloods (10/7)	
CTV	Summer	Etalk (9/23)	The Big Bang Theory (R) (9/23)	Shark Tank (R)		Cross Country Cake Off		Blue Bloods (R)	
CTV	Mid-summer	Etalk (9/23)	The Big Bang Theory (R) (9/23)	Transplant (R)		Transplant (R)		Blue Bloods (R)	
CTV 2		The Big Bang Theory (R)	Etalk	CTV Movie					
Global	Fall/Winter/Spring	ET (9/16)	ET Canada (9/16)	S.W.A.T. (10/7)		**Fire Country** (10/7)		Crime Beat (10/7)	
Global	Summer	ET (9/16)	ET Canada (9/16)	S.W.A.T. (R)		Fire Country (R)		Crime Beat (10/7)	
Global	Mid-summer	ET (9/16)	ET Canada (9/16)	Tough as Nails		Private Eyes (R)		Crime Beat (R)	

=== Saturday ===
Network		7:00 p.m.	7:30 p.m.	8:00 p.m.	8:30 p.m.	9:00 p.m.	9:30 p.m.	10:00 p.m.	10:30 p.m.
CBC	Fall/Winter/Spring	Hockey Night in Canada (10/15)							
CBC	Summer	The Nature of Things (R)		Absolutely Canadian (R)		CBC Movie			
Citytv	Fall/Winter	Hockey Night in Canada (10/15)						Hudson & Rex (R) (10/15)	
Citytv	Spring	Hudson & Rex (R)		Citytv Movie				Hudson & Rex (R) (10/15)	
CTV		W5		CTV Movie				Heavy Rescue: 401 (R)	
Global	Fall	The New Reality (10/1)	Border Security: Canada's Front Line (R)	Private Eyes (R)		Ransom (R)		48 Hours (9/17)	
Global	Winter/Spring	The New Reality (10/1)	Border Security: Canada's Front Line (R)	Family Law (R)		Nurses (R)		Private Eyes (R)	
Global	Summer	Border Security: Canada's Front Line (R)	Border Security: Canada's Front Line (R)	Private Eyes (R)		Ransom (R)		Departure (R)	
Global	Mid-summer	Border Security: Canada's Front Line (R)	Border Security: Canada's Front Line (R)	Private Eyes (R)		Ransom (R)		Salvage Kings (R)	

== By network ==
=== CBC ===
Returning series:

- 22 Minutes
- Diggstown
- Dragon's Den
- Family Feud Canada
- The Fifth Estate
- The Great Canadian Baking Show
- Heartland
- Marketplace
- Moonshine
- Murdoch Mysteries
- The National
- The Nature of Things
- The New Wave of Standup
- The Passionate Eye
- Pretty Hard Cases
- Race Against the Tide
- Run the Burbs
- Son of a Critch
- Sort Of
- Still Standing
- Strays
- Travel Man: 48 Hours In...
- War of the Worlds
- Workin' Moms

New series:

- Bones of Crows
- Bollywed
- Canada's Ultimate Challenge
- Comedy Night with Rick Mercer
- Essex County
- Fakes
- The Legacy Awards
- Lido TV
- The North Water
- Plan B
- Ridley Road
- SkyMed
- Stay Tooned
- Stuff the British Stole
- Summit '72

Not returning from 2021–22:

- A Suitable Boy
- Coroner
- Hot Docs at Home
- TallBoyz
- Victoria

=== Citytv ===
Returning series

- America's Got Talent
- American Auto
- American Idol
- The Bachelor
- The Bachelorette
- Bachelor in Paradise (USA)
- Bachelor in Paradise Canada
- Canada's Got Talent
- Capital One College Bowl
- Celebrity Family Feud
- Chicago Fire
- Chicago Med
- Chicago P.D.
- Claim to Fame
- Dateline NBC (Friday broadcasts only; moved from CHCH)
- Grand Crew
- Hell's Kitchen
- Hockey Night in Canada
- Hudson & Rex
- Jimmy Kimmel Live! (late night)
- Law & Order
- Law & Order: Organized Crime
- Law & Order: Special Victims Unit
- That's My Jam
- Young Rock

New series

- The Jennifer Hudson Show (daytime)
- Lopez vs. Lopez
- Poker Face (Citytv+)
- The Prank Panel
- Quantum Leap
- Wong & Winchester

Not returning from 2021–22:

- Black-ish
- Dancing with the Stars (moved to Disney+)
- The Endgame
- Kenan
- Mr. Mayor
- Ordinary Joe

=== CTV/CTV 2 ===
Returning series

- The $100,000 Pyramid
- 9-1-1: Lone Star
- The Amazing Race (USA)
- The Amazing Race Canada
- American Ninja Warrior
- Big Sky
- Blue Bloods
- Bob Hearts Abishola
- Call Me Kat
- Celebrity Wheel of Fortune
- Children Ruin Everything
- The Cleaning Lady
- The Conners
- Etalk
- Generation Gap
- The Goldbergs
- The Good Doctor
- Grey's Anatomy
- Kung Fu
- La Brea
- Lego Masters
- Magnum P.I.
- The Masked Singer
- MasterChef
- Next Level Chef
- The Resident
- The Rookie
- Shark Tank
- Station 19
- Sunday Night Football
- Thursday Night Football (Note: Prime Video's exclusivity for these games beginning with the 2022 season only covers the United States. Bell Media has a separate deal with the NFL for Canadian broadcast rights.)
- Transplant
- The Voice
- W5
- Weakest Link
- The Wonder Years
- Young Sheldon

New series

- Alaska Daily
- Alert: Missing Persons Unit
- Almost Paradise
- America's Got Talent: All-Stars
- Battle of the Generations
- Celebrity Jeopardy!
- The Company You Keep
- Cross Country Cake Off
- East New York
- Evolving Vegan
- Farming for Love
- Gordon Ramsay's Food Stars
- Jeopardy! Masters
- Night Court
- The Rookie: Feds
- Shelved
- Sight Unseen
- The Spencer Sisters
- Sullivan's Crossing
- True Lies
- Will Trent
- The Winchesters

Not returning from 2021–22:

- America's Got Talent: Extreme
- B Positive
- The Big Leap
- Home Economics (moved to Global)
- Our Kind of People
- Pivoting
- Queens
- This Is Us

=== Global ===
Returning series

- 9-1-1
- 48 Hours
- 60 Minutes
- Abbott Elementary
- Big Brother (USA)
- Big Brother Canada
- The Blacklist
- Crime Beat
- CSI: Vegas
- Departure
- The Equalizer
- ET (USA)
- ET Canada
- Family Law
- FBI
- FBI: International
- FBI: Most Wanted
- Ghosts
- Home Economics (moved from CTV)
- NCIS
- NCIS: Hawai'i
- NCIS: Los Angeles
- The Neighborhood
- New Amsterdam
- Survivor
- S.W.A.T.

New series

- Accused
- Fire Country
- LA Fire and Rescue
- Monarch
- The Real Love Boat
- So Help Me Todd
- Superfan

Not returning from 2021–22:

- Bull
- Good Sam
- How We Roll
- SEAL Team (moved to Paramount+)
- The Thing About Pam
- United States of Al
- Women of the Movement
- Days of Our Lives (daytime moved to W Network)

== Renewals and cancellations ==
=== Renewals ===
==== CBC ====
- SkyMed—Renewed for a second season on March 3, 2023.
- Sort Of—Renewed for a third season on December 15, 2022.

==== Citytv ====
- Quantum Leap—Renewed for a second season on December 12, 2022.

==== CTV/CTV 2 ====
- The Amazing Race—Renewed for a thirty-fifth season on February 21, 2023.
- The Amazing Race Canada—Renewed for a tenth season on September 19, 2023.
- Bob Hearts Abishola—Renewed for a fifth season on January 25, 2023.
- The Cleaning Lady—Renewed for a third season on February 1, 2023.
- Football Night in America—Renewed for an eighteenth season on March 18, 2021; deal will go to a twenty-eighth season in 2033.
- La Brea—Renewed for a third season on January 31, 2023.
- Lego Masters—Renewed for a fourth season on December 14, 2022.
- Lingo—Renewed for a second season on February 21, 2023.
- Magnum P.I.—Renewed for a sixth season on June 30, 2022.
- NBC Sunday Night Football—Renewed for an eighteenth season on March 18, 2021; deal will go to a twenty-eighth season in 2033.
- Night Court—Renewed for a second season on February 2, 2023.
- Young Sheldon—Renewed for a seventh season on March 30, 2021.

==== Global ====
- 48 Hours—Renewed for a thirty-fifth season on February 21, 2023.
- 60 Minutes—Renewed for a fifty-sixth season on February 21, 2023.
- Abbott Elementary—Renewed for a third season on January 11, 2023.
- CSI: Vegas—Renewed for a third season on February 21, 2023.
- The Equalizer—Renewed for a fourth season on May 5, 2022.
- FBI—Renewed for a sixth season on May 9, 2022.
- FBI: International—Renewed for a third season on May 9, 2022.
- FBI: Most Wanted—Renewed for a fifth season on May 9, 2022.
- Fire Country—Renewed for a second season on January 6, 2023.
- Ghosts—Renewed for a third season on January 12, 2023.
- The Neighborhood—Renewed for a sixth season on January 23, 2023.
- So Help Me Todd—Renewed for a second season on February 2, 2023.
- Survivor—Renewed for a forty-fifth season on February 21, 2023.
- Tough as Nails—Renewed for a fifth season on March 9, 2022.

=== Cancellations/series endings ===
==== CBC ====
- Diggstown—It was announced on October 6, 2022, that season four would be the final season. The series concluded on November 16, 2022.
- Pretty Hard Cases—It was announced on February 8, 2023, that season three would be the final season. The series concluded on March 8, 2023.
- Workin' Moms—It was announced on June 20, 2022, that season seven would be the final season. The series concluded on March 28, 2023.

==== CTV/CTV 2 ====
- Call Me Kat—Canceled on May 5, 2023, after three seasons.
- The Goldbergs—It was announced on February 23, 2023, that season ten would be the final season.
- The Resident—Canceled on April 6, 2023, after six seasons.

==== Global ====
- The Blacklist—It was announced on February 1, 2023, that season ten would be the final season.
- NCIS: Los Angeles—It was announced on January 20, 2023, that season fourteen would be the final season. The series will conclude on May 14, 2023.
- New Amsterdam—On March 14, 2022, it was announced that New Amsterdam would end after its upcoming 13-episode fifth season. The series concluded on January 27, 2023.
- Monarch—On December 7, 2022, it was announced that Monarch was canceled after a single season.
- The Real Love Boat—It was announced on October 28, 2022, that the series would move to Paramount+ beginning November 2, 2022 after its first four episodes due to poor ratings, marking the first cancellation of the season.

== Ratings ==
Canadian TV ratings provider Numeris quietly announced in August 2022 that, as of the start of the 2022–23 broadcast year on August 29, it would no longer produce reports of the top 30 programs each week, meaning any publicly-available ratings data going forward will be limited to the data the networks choose to publicize themselves. The agency has thus far declined to comment on its reasons for the change.

== See also ==
- 2022–23 United States network television schedule
