= Karen Fralich =

Canadian sand artist

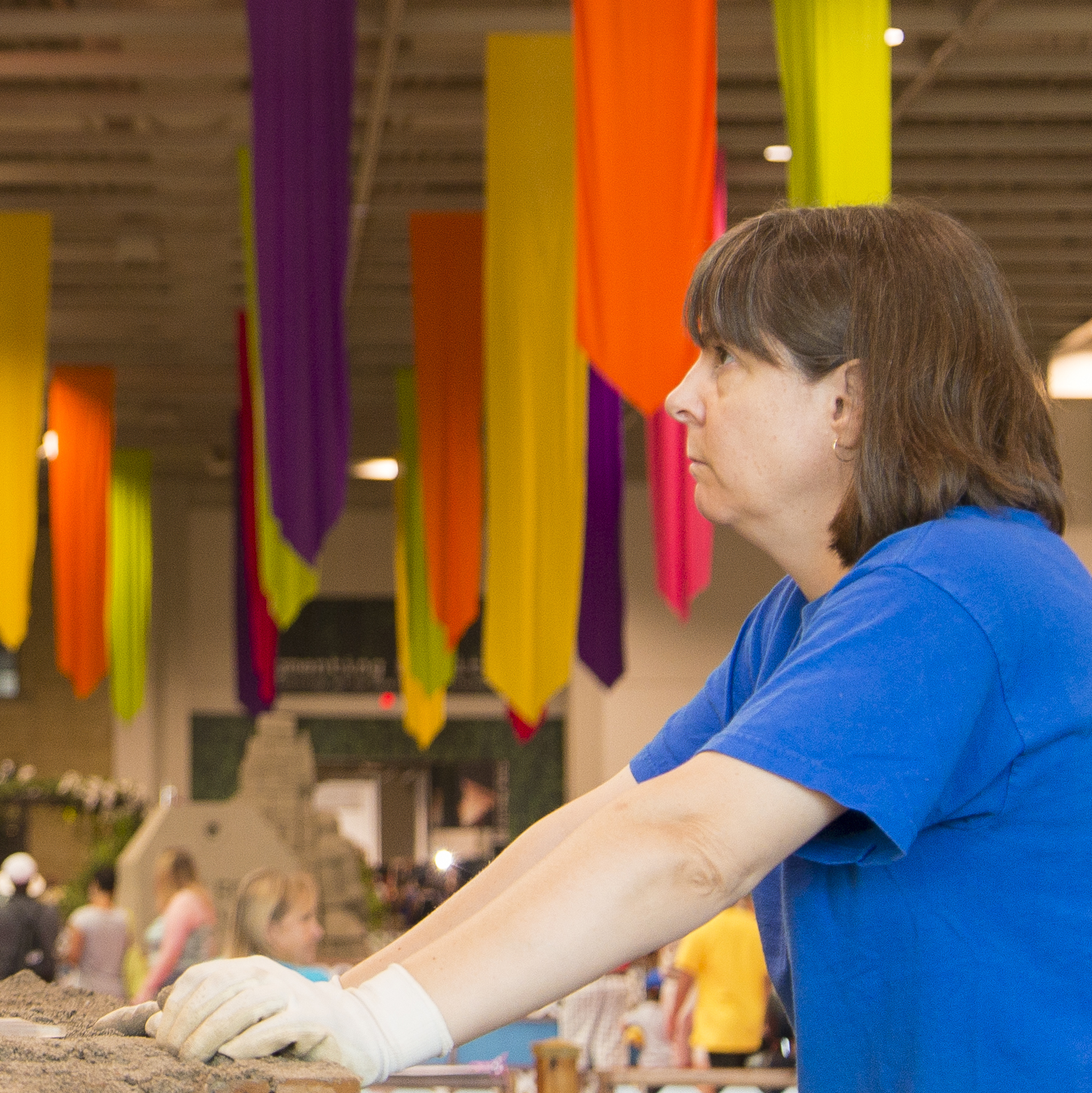
- in 2016
- Known for: sand sculpture
- Website: sandqube.ca

Karen Fralich is a Canadian artist known for sand sculpting. Based in Guelph, Ontario, she is a five-time sand sculpting world champion and has been a judge on the reality television show Race Against the Tide since 2021.

== Life ==
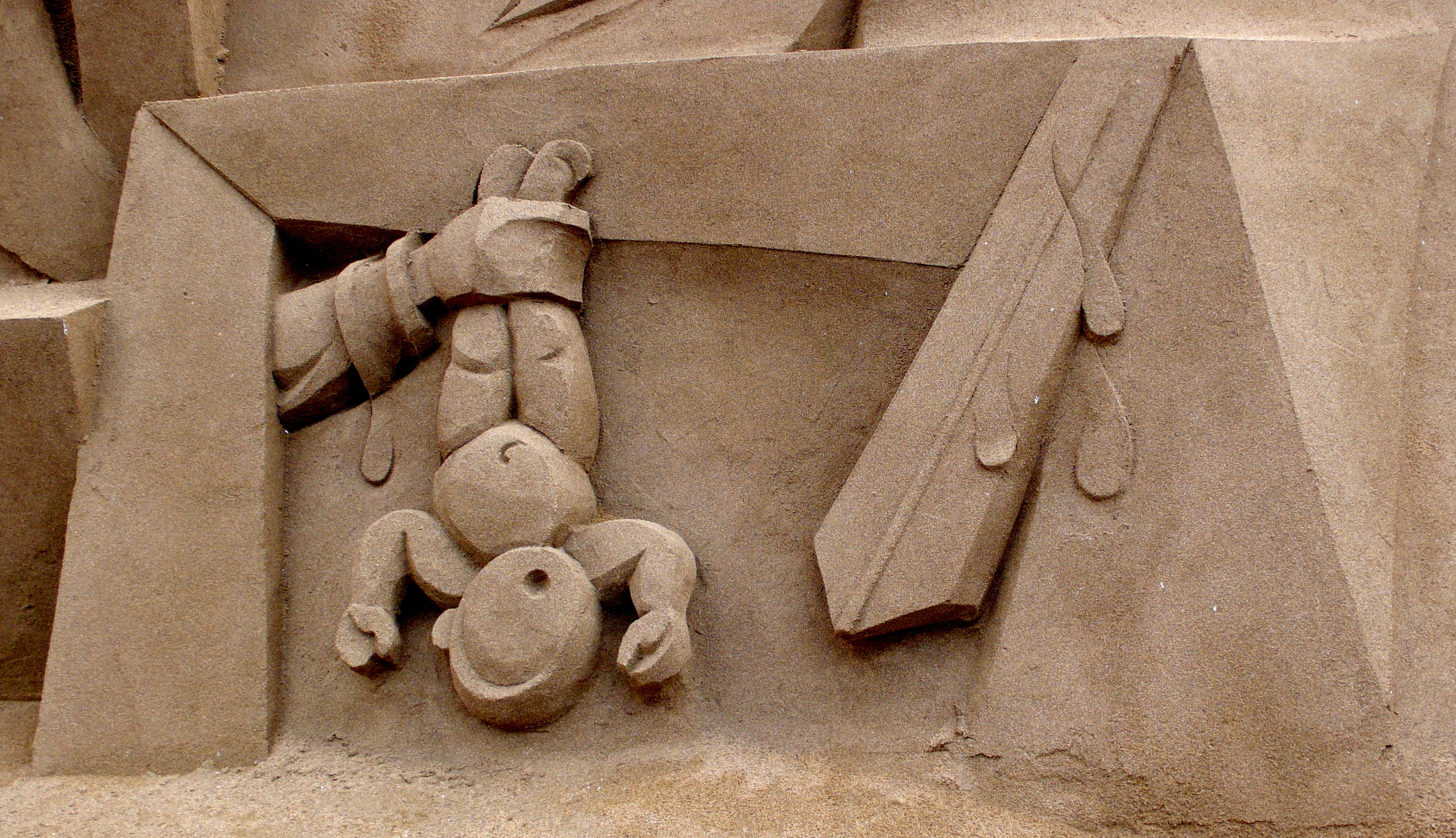
Detail of the Massacre of the Innocents and Flight to Bethlehem created by Fralich in 2008

Fralich began sculpting as a teenager after being enrolled in a seven-week pottery course by her mother. She was introduced to sand sculpting in 1994 while working in a pottery studio. Fralich spent four years training in the field while working as a manager of a McDonald's restaurant. She has been sand sculpting full-time since 2000. One of her first commissioned pieces was a 500-tonne recreation of the Emerald City from The Wizard of Oz.

Fralich is a five-time world champion sand sculptor. She participated in an international sand sculpting competition for the first time in 1998, competing in Harrison Hot Springs, British Columbia. In 2004 she was named the First Place Solo World Champion at the same competition for a Haida-inspired entry that included recreations of First Nations elders.

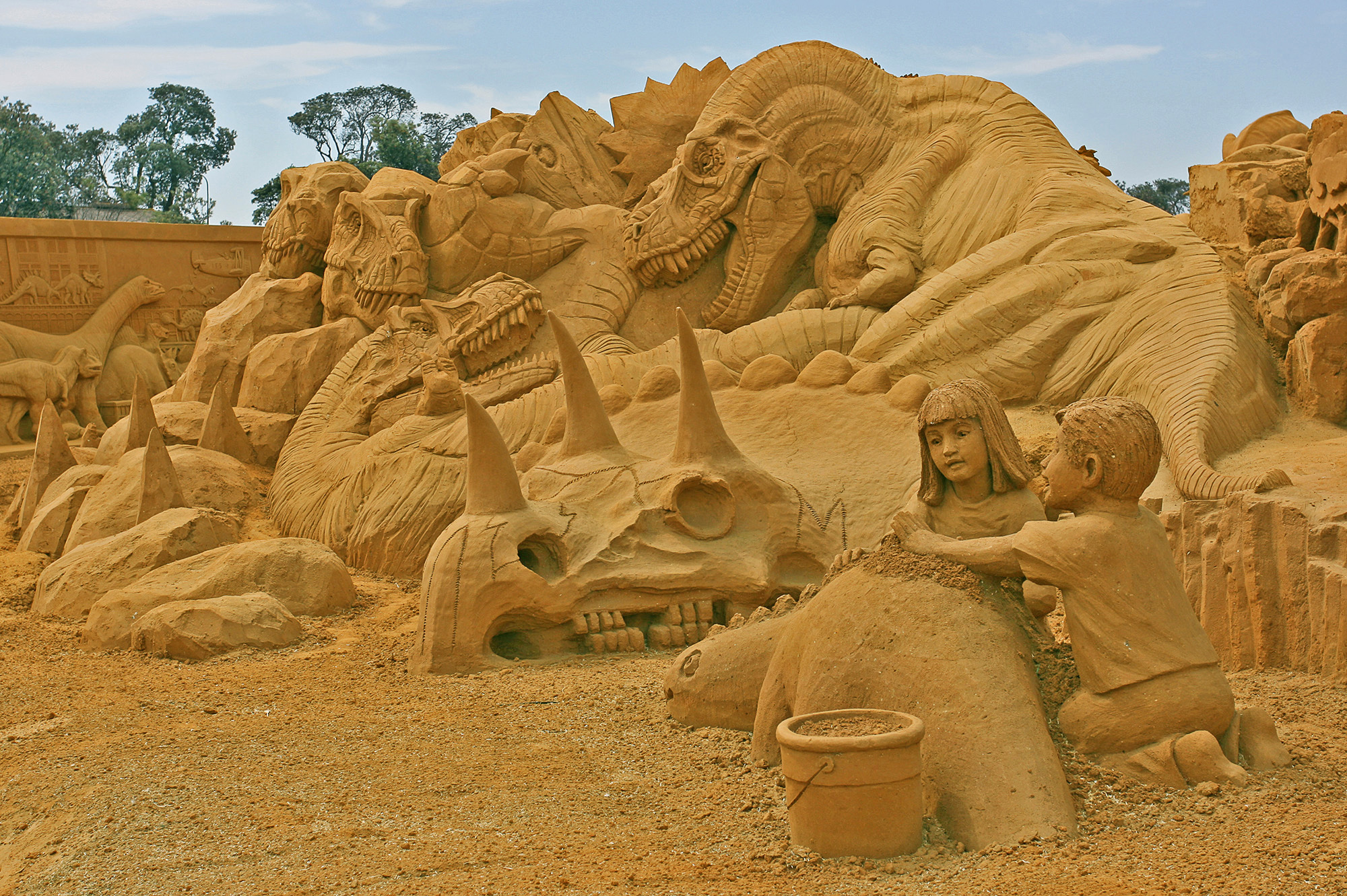
"Dinostory" (2009) at Sand Sculpting Australia created by Fralich, Peter Bignell, Martijn Rijerse, Jino van Bruissenen and Christina Mija.

In addition to sand sculpting competitions and commissions, Fralich has created numerous pieces for the Canadian National Exhibition. In 2014 she was made a 100-tonne of a scene from The Empire Strikes Back. Five years later she created a piece in honour of the Toronto Raptors following their NBA championship win.

Fralich has been a judge on the Canadian reality television show Race Against the Tide since 2021. She was initially hired as a consultant on the show, but she was moved to an on-camera role.
