= Rodrigo Massa =

Brazilian actor and singer

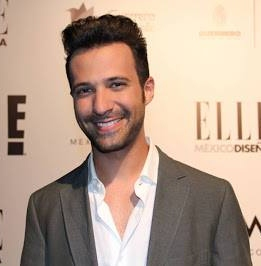
- Born: March 26, 1989 (age 37); São Bernardo do Campo, São Paulo
- Occupations: Actor, singer, TV host

Rodrigo Massa (born March 26, 1989, São Bernardo do Campo, São Paulo), is a Brazilian actor, singer and television host who lives and works between Mexico City and Los Angeles. Best known in Latin America for his work on Mexican TV shows such as El Dragón: Return of a Warrior, La Piloto and Like, Rodrigo took his first steps in Hollywood five years ago, where he landed his first leading roles on Lifetime's Merry Textmas and on Eli Roth's Urban Legend. He is currently part of the main cast of CTV's The Spencer Sisters, alongside Lea Thompson and Stacey Farber, which is now airing in the United States, every Wednesday on the CW.

== Biography ==
At age 20, after studying four semesters of Linguistics at the University of São Paulo, he decided to leave his studies and his work as a teacher of languages and move to Mexico to try his luck in the show business. His artistic career began in 2007, when he made his first appearances in TV commercials. After graduating from CEA (the acting school that belongs to Mexican TV Network Televisa), where he studied acting, singing, TV hosting and dancing, he participated in more than 150 advertising campaigns in Mexico, El Salvador, Honduras, Guatemala, Uruguay and United States, making him one of the most sought after faces of Latin American advertisement.

In 2012 he was offered his first opportunity as a TV presenter, hosting the music show México Suena, also on Televisa. He went on to host a great number of shows with themes that ranged from sports (Tú Diriges – Televisa) to fashion (Elle México Diseña – E! Entertainment Television), kids (1 2 3 Clic – Televisa), lifestyle (Zona Trendy – E! Entertainment Television), electronic music (Latin Stage – Ritmoson Latino), travel (Top Five – TLC (TV network)), home shopping (CJ Group) and many others.

As for his acting career, in 2013 he played an FBI agent in the highest-grossing Mexican film of all time Instructions Not Included. He landed his first major role in a TV show in 2014, giving life to Amador Zúñiga on The Color of Passion, produced by Televisa and distributed around the world in over 50 countries. Another opportunity came in 2015 with the premiere of Un Mal Date on Latin American digital platform blim, where he played Omar Santiago, a cheating boyfriend who became a huge disappointment to Laya, played by Mexican popstar Ximena Sariñana.

In 2016, Rodrigo signed a two-year contract with Ocesa Teatro which led to his first theater play Verdad o Reto (Truth or Dare), a musical tribute to the 90s, where he played the lead role Pepe for two seasons. His second theater challenge, one year later, was the role of Juan Ramón in the British comic opera Iolanthe, which had an entire sold-out season at the National Arts Center in Mexico City. It's worth mentioning that not a single person in the all-male cast consisting of 32 actors had an understudy during the entire season. But his biggest theater success was yet to come: Mentiras el musical, the longest-running musical in the history of Latin American theater – 10 years of uninterrupted performances. Rodrigo was hired in early 2017 to play the only male part in the musical: Emmanuel, being witness to two of the play's most important celebrations – the 3000-performance mark and the one-million-viewer record.

In February 2018 he announced the release of his first single "Acabo de Soñar Contigo" with a double launch on digital platforms, both in Spanish and in his mother tongue Portuguese. The single was followed by a music video that was praised by the critics due to its shocking plot twist which reveals a gay romance towards the end, portrayed by Italian-Venezuelan model Fabrizio Sassano and Rodrigo Massa himself.

After a long streak of Mexican shows, he joined the cast of Hallmark's Destination Wedding as AJ. In 2018 he played Aldo Tapia on Netflix’s La Piloto. He then went on to join the next Netflix Original series El Dragón - Return Of A Warrior, where he was cast as Piero Scarinci. The show was in Netflix’s top 10 in over 30 countries. At the best moment of his career, he decided to move to LA and landed his first lead in a US-based production: Merry Textmas, which premiered on Lifetime on December 4, 2022. He also sings the main song within the soundtrack alongside European popstar Andra - How Could I Have Known. Recently, he joined the cast of the horror show Urban Legend, where he plays one of the leading roles, Ben. The series was written and produced by Eli Roth. It premiered on the Travel Channel and is now available on Discovery+ worldwide. He also landed a role in the feature film Cheat, produced by Matchbox Pictures, which is currently in post production.

Rodrigo is currently part of the main cast of CTV's The Spencer Sisters, alongside Lea Thompson and Stacey Farber. The show was filmed in Winnipeg, Canada, and is currently airing in the USA, Portugal, Belgium, France, Germany and Japan. Rodrigo plays Antonio, an LGBTOI+ character who is much beloved by the community of Alder Bluffs. Married to Zane, he is one of Darby's (Stacey Farber) best friends, and always gets caught between her and her mother (Lea Thompson) in their quarrels. His character becomes much more prominent after episode 4, where Antonio is the victim of a mysterious hater who tries to ruin his business and his life.

In 2024 he collaborated with Canadian singer-songwriter Adrian Sutherland on "Don Politico", a mixed English-Spanish version of Sutherland's 2019 single "Politician Man".

== Filmography ==
Film role
Year	Title	Roles	Notes
2011	Vino tinto	The Husband	Short film
2013	No se aceptan devoluciones	Agent FBI 2	
2022	Merry Textmas	Alex	Leading role
2024	Cheat	Alex	Post production

Television roles
Year	Title	Roles	Notes
2011	Ni contigo ni sin ti	Unknown role	Episodes: "Carta de despedida" and "Logran hablar"
2012	Como dice el dicho	Guillermo	Episodes: "Quién no oye consejos"
2014	The Color of Passion	Young Amador	5 episodes
2015	La sombra del pasado	Hermano Serapio	3 episodes
2015	Pasión y poder	Unknown role	5 episodes
2016	Un mal date	Omar Santiago	Episodes: "Ex" and "Borracho"
2017	Su nombre era Dolores, la Jenn que yo conocí	Green-eyed taxi driver 2	Episodes: "Joyas de fantasía" and "Purgatorio"
2017	Destination Wedding	AJ	Television film
2018	Like	Richie Comanche	Recurring role; 54 episodes
2019	El Dragón: Return of a Warrior	Piero	Recurring role
2022	Urban Legend	Ben	Leading role
2023	The Spencer Sisters	Antonio Pereira	Series Regular
