= Battle of the Generations =

- Genre: Game show
- Presented by: Lilly Singh
- Country of origin: Canada
- Original language: English
- No. of seasons: 2

Production
- Production companies: Bell Media Studios; Motion Content Group; Unicorn Island Productions

Original release
- Network: CTV
- Release: June 19, 2023 – present

Battle of the Generations is a Canadian television game show that premiered on CTV Television Network on June 19, 2023. Hosted by Lilly Singh, the series is a trivia competition in which members of four generations — baby boomers, generation X, millennials and generation Z – compete to answer trivia questions about their respective historical eras with a prize of $25,000 for the winner of each episode. Unlike most game shows, this show is filmed without an audience or didn't include audience sound effects.

The series is produced by Bell Media Studios, Motion Content Group and Unicorn Island Productions.

== Notable contestants ==
Andrew Long, a quizmaster and game show expert from Toronto, won the top prize of $25,000 on the season one finale, aired on February 28, 2024. Long's experience on the show is detailed on the game show podcast Tell Us About Yourself.

Season two differed from the previous season as it was filmed in front of a studio audience. It produced five winners: Gen Xers Ellen Melvin Snider and Andrew Franklin, millennials Andrea Noskey and Amanda Lee Timmins, and boomer Helen Loftin. Millennial Tesher won the $25K for the Regina Immigrant Women Centre on a special celebrity edition that also featured Nicolina Bozzo, Tyler Stewart and Molly Johnson.
