= The Spencer Sisters =

2023 Canadian police procedural television series

- Genre: Police procedural; Comedy drama
- Created by: Alan McCullough
- Starring: Lea Thompson; Stacey Farber
- Composers: Ryan McLarnon and Rob Melamed
- Country of origin: Canada
- Original language: English
- No. of seasons: 1
- No. of episodes: 10

Production
- Production locations: Winnipeg, Manitoba, Canada
- Production companies: eOne Canada; Buffalo Gal

Original release
- Network: CTV
- Release: January 29 – April 21, 2023

The Spencer Sisters is a Canadian drama television series that premiered January 29, 2023 on CTV. The series stars Lea Thompson and Stacey Farber as Victoria and Darby Spencer, respectively; a mother and daughter duo who are thrust into investigating crimes in their home town of Alder Bluffs. In May 2024, the series was cancelled after one season.

== Premise ==
When her estranged daughter Darby unexpectedly returns home (having resigned from her career as a police officer in protest of being overlooked and learned her boyfriend was cheating on her), famed mystery novelist Victoria Spencer decides to finally pursue her dream of being a private detective. The two women form the Spencer Sisters Detective Agency (capitalizing on the fact that Victoria is often mistaken for Darby's sister as opposed to her mother) and start tackling a variety of cases in the fictional town of Alder Bluffs.

== Cast and characters ==
=== Main ===
- Lea Thompson as Victoria Spencer, a famous writer of mystery novels and owner of the Spencer Sisters Detective Agency
- Stacey Farber as Darby Spencer, Victoria's daughter, a former cop, and co-owner of the Spencer Sisters Detective Agency

=== Recurring ===
- Thomas Antony Olajide as Zane Graham, Darby’s best friend from high school and an officer with the Alder Bluffs Police Department
- Edward Ruttle as Dr. Lucas Collins, Darby’s high school flame
- Husein Madhavji as Alastair Dhumal, Victoria's "IT Consultant" (a.k.a. hacker)
- Ayesha Mansur Gonsalves as Sarita Stark, Victoria's feisty literary agent
- Rodrigo Massa as Antonio Pereira, Zane's husband
- Kaitlyn Leeb as Lindsay Yip, a hotshot lawyer who is Lucas' fiancée
- Adam Hurtig as Harris, the chief of detectives for the Alder Bluffs Police Department

Guest appearances by Samuel Wexler, Paul Popowich, Andrew Bushell, Cindy Sampson, Seán Cullen, Matt Wells, Alex Ozerov, Jennifer Hui, Nancy Sorel, Mercedes Morris, Julius Cho, Mika Amonsen, Daniel Kash, Paul Essiembre, Tova Epp, Zarrin Darnell-Martin, Hazel and Joel Baez Silvestre.

== Episodes ==
No.	Title	Directed by	Written by	Original release date
1	"The Scholar's Snafu"	April Mullen	Alan McCullough	January 29, 2023
After quitting her job as a metro police officer, Darby Spencer leaves her unfaithful boyfriend and returns to her hometown of Adler Bluffs, moving in with her mother Victoria, a best-selling mystery author. Darby's friend Kaia learns she has been expelled from university over claims of plagiarism, something she disputes. Darby and Victoria go to the university to investigate the claims.
2	"The Executive's Elegy"	April Mullen	Jessie Gabe	February 17, 2023
A pharmaceutical executive returns home to find her fiancé has drowned in their swimming pool. Believing her husband was murdered, as he was a lifeguard, she hires Victoria and Darby to investigate. They find his death may be connected to corporate espionage.
3	"The Coder's Calamity"	David Wellington	Jennica Harper	February 24, 2023
A developer working on a health care app is assaulted in the home she shares with two other developers, the server is stolen, and the back-up server destroyed. Darby and Victoria, now working under the name "The Spencer Sisters", investigate. Victoria calls her interior designer friend to set up an office, but Victoria and Darby argue over where to put it.
4	"The Restauranteur's Ruin"	David Wellington	Jenn Engels	March 3, 2023
A deepfake video of Antonio yelling at his employees goes viral, and after rats are released in the restaurant, it is shut down. Darby and Victoria investigate the case as possible sabotage. Victoria meets with a famous author for advice on her next novel, but he is harshly critical of everything she writes.
5	"The Decorator's Debacle"	Joyce Wong	Evany Rosen	March 10, 2023
Following an auction, Victoria's friend Rory crashes his car into a ditch, and he believes someone tried to kill him, hiring Darby and Victoria to investigate. Darby, who is skeptical of Rory's claims, takes umbrage with a character in Victoria's next book that is based on her.
6	"The Winemaker's Woe"	Joyce Wong	Nathalie Younglai	March 17, 2023
Des Lewis, an old classmate of Darby's who runs a winery, hires her and Victoria to investigate vandalism and sabotage at the winery. Victoria meets a visiting businessman, Billy West, during the investigation.
7	"The Lawyer's Lament"	Melanie Orr	Jason Ip & Rosa Laborde	March 24, 2023
Lindsay is sent a threatening letter, and Lucas hires the Spencer Sisters to find out who is responsible. The threats are connected to a lawsuit in which Lindsay is defending a mining company against accusations made by some miners. Lucas and Lindsay stay at the Spencer home to avoid the threats.
8	"The Virtuoso's Vexation"	Melanie Orr	Jennica Harper	March 31, 2023
A rare violin is stolen from an elite music academy, and the Spencer Sisters are hired to recover it. Darby begins to suspect that Billy may actually be a con artist.
9	"The Diva's Disaster"	Douglas Mitchell	Jenn Engels	April 14, 2023
The actress who played Victoria's detective character on film asks Victoria for help after her co-star is hospitalized from an allergy and she is suspected of poisoning him. Alastair continues investigating Billy, despite Darby telling him not to.
10	"The Runaway's Regret"	Amanda Tapping	Alan McCullough	April 21, 2023
Victoria is with Billy when suddenly a group of armed men break in and abduct him. Victoria, who hid in a closet, reaches out to Alastair and Darby for help. They learn Billy was an art authenticator, and his captors demand Victoria bring them a painting known as "The Alchemist".

== Production ==
=== Filming ===
The series was shot in summer 2022 in various locations in southern Manitoba including Winnipeg. At least one episode was partially filmed in Dundas, Ontario.

=== International broadcast ===
On May 11, 2023, it was announced that The CW Network picked up the series for the fall 2023 lineup. It premiered on October 4, 2023.

On October 13, 2023, it was announced that the show was licensed to Warner Bros. Discovery in France, NBCUniversal in Germany, Japan’s Wowow, Disney (Middle East and Portugal), Play Media (Belgium), TV Joj (Slovakia) and Tet/Telia (Baltics).
