= Summit '72 =

Canadian documentary television series

Summit '72 is a Canadian documentary television series that aired in 2022 on CBC Television. The series recounts the history of the 1972 Summit Series hockey competition between Canada and the Soviet Union.

It was written and directed by Ravi Baichwal, Dave Bidini, Nicholas de Pencier and Robert MacAskill.

The series received a Canadian Screen Award nomination for Best History Documentary Program or Series at the 11th Canadian Screen Awards in 2023.

== Episodes ==
No.	Title	Directed by	Written by	Original release date
1	"Hockey Nations"	Unknown	Unknown	September 14, 2022
2	"Clash in Hockey Culture"	Unknown	Unknown	September 21, 2022
3	"Finding Each Other Behind the Iron Curtain"	Unknown	Unknown	September 28, 2022
4	"Legacy"	Unknown	Unknown	October 5, 2022
