= Race Against the Tide =

Canadian television reality series

- Developed by: Kelsey Espensen, Ron Carroll.
- Directed by: Graeme Lynch
- No. of seasons: 4
- No. of episodes: 40

Production
- Executive producers: Matthew Hornburg; Mark J.W. Bishop
- Producer: Stephen Foster
- Editor: Lindsay Ragone

Original release
- Network: CBC Television
- Release: September 9, 2021 – May 26, 2024

Race Against the Tide is a Canadian reality television series that premiered on September 9, 2021 on CBC Television. Hosted by Shaun Majumder in season 1 and Maestro Fresh Wes in seasons 2 and 3, the series features ten teams of artists competing to produce sand sculptures in the Bay of Fundy at New River Beach Provincial Park before the tide rises to destroy their creations. The sculptures are evaluated by two judges including Karen Fralich.

A British adaptation of the series, hosted by Iain Stirling, was filmed in summer 2025 and debuted on BBC Two in August 2026. The format is owned by Blue Ant Media.

== Episodes ==
| Season | Episodes | Originally released | |
| Season | Episodes | First released | Last released |
|---|---|---|---|
| 1 | 10 | September 9, 2021 | October 14, 2021 |
| 2 | 10 | July 10, 2022 | September 11, 2022 |
| 3 | 10 | July 16, 2023 | September 17, 2023 |

=== Season 1 (2021) ===
| No. overall | No. in season | Title | Original release date |
|---|---|---|---|
| 1 | 1 | "Team Spirit" | September 9, 2021 |
| 2 | 2 | "What Lurks Below" | September 9, 2021 |
| 3 | 3 | "Sky High" | September 16, 2021 |
| 4 | 4 | "Little Things" | September 16, 2021 |
| 5 | 5 | "Fossil Mania" | September 23, 2021 |
| 6 | 6 | "Things That Go Bump in the Night" | September 23, 2021 |
| 7 | 7 | "Memory Lane" | October 7, 2021 |
| 8 | 8 | "Heroes & Villains" | October 7, 2021 |
| 9 | 9 | "Optical Illusion" | October 14, 2021 |
| 10 | 10 | "The Artists' Choice" | October 14, 2021 |

=== Season 2 (2022) ===
| No. overall | No. in season | Title | Original release date |
|---|---|---|---|
| 11 | 1 | "Sand Speciality" | July 10, 2022 |
| 12 | 2 | "In a Galaxy Far Away" | July 17, 2022 |
| 13 | 3 | "Sky High Architecture" | July 24, 2022 |
| 14 | 4 | "The Wild Side" | July 31, 2022 |
| 15 | 5 | "Race Against the Tears" | August 7, 2022 |
| 16 | 6 | "Night Terrors" | August 14, 2022 |
| 17 | 7 | "Ahoy Matey" | August 21, 2022 |
| 18 | 8 | "Elementary" | August 28, 2022 |
| 19 | 9 | "A Cut Above" | September 4, 2022 |
| 20 | 10 | "One Fierce Final" | September 11, 2022 |

=== Season 3 (2023) ===
| No. overall | No. in season | Title | Original release date |
|---|---|---|---|
| 21 | 1 | "The Signature Style" | July 16, 2023 |
| 22 | 2 | "Claim to Fame" | July 23, 2023 |
| 23 | 3 | "Dawn of Time" | July 30, 2023 |
| 24 | 4 | "Fantasy Land" | August 6, 2023 |
| 25 | 5 | "Architecture of the Future" | August 13, 2023 |
| 26 | 6 | "Dream House" | August 20, 2023 |
| 27 | 7 | "Big Headed" | August 27, 2023 |
| 28 | 8 | "Fright Night" | September 3, 2023 |
| 29 | 9 | "Semi-Final Magic" | September 10, 2023 |
| 30 | 10 | "The Final Countdown" | September 17, 2023 |
