= Bollywed =

Canadian documentary television series

- Genre: Docuseries
- Starring: Kuki Singh; Sarab Singh; Chandan Singh; Chandni Singh; Roop Singh
- Country of origin: Canada
- Original language: English
- No. of seasons: 3

Production
- Running time: 22 minutes
- Production company: HeartHat Entertainment

Original release
- Network: CBC Television
- Release: January 12, 2023 – present

Bollywed is a Canadian documentary television series that premiered in January 2023 on CBC Television. The series profiles Chandan Fashion, a family-owned bridal shop in Toronto's Little India neighbourhood which specializes in traditional Indian bridal wear.

One episode of the series features an appearance by Mark "Priyanka" Suknanan, the first season winner of Canada's Drag Race, as he shops for a new outfit for his upcoming world tour.

The series debuted on January 12, 2023.
