= Push (Canadian TV series) =

2023 Canadian documentary series

- Country of origin: Canada
- Original language: English

Original release
- Network: CBC Television
- Release: February 24, 2023 – March 3, 2024

Push is a Canadian television documentary series that premiered on February 24, 2023, on CBC Television. The series profiles the "Wheelie Peeps", a group of wheelchair users in Edmonton, Alberta, who have come together as a circle of friends around Benveet Gill, the co-founder of the city's ReYu Paralysis Recovery Centre.

The cast members of the show include Paralympian Brian McPherson, a sledge hockey player, and his girlfriend Victoria Berezovich, an advocate for Charcot–Marie–Tooth disease awareness; Natasha Urkow, a quadriplegic playwright and actress who is navigating the complications of pregnancy; Brittany Neunzig, a teacher who makes disability awareness videos for YouTube; Aleem Jaffer, an employment readiness consultant who is newly married to his husband Nick; and Riccardo Baldini, a concert pianist relearning to play adaptively after a spinal cord injury.

Cast member Brian McPherson died on November 12, 2025.
