= Ride (2023 TV series) =

- Genre: Neo-Western; Family drama
- Created by: Rebecca Boss; Chris Masi
- Starring: Nancy Travis; Tiera Skovbye; Beau Mirchoff; Sara Garcia; Jake Foy; Tyler Jacob Moore
- Country of origin: Canada
- Original language: English
- No. of seasons: 1
- No. of episodes: 10

Production
- Executive producers: Sherri Cooper-Landsman; Rebecca Boss; Chris Masi; Elana Barry; Josh Adler; Tom Cox; F.J. Denny; Alexandra Clarke; Jordy Randall; Virginia Rankin
- Production locations: Calgary, Alberta, Canada
- Running time: 43 minutes
- Production companies: Blink49 Studios; SEVEN24 Films; Bell Media

Original release
- Network: Hallmark Channel; CTV Drama Channel
- Release: March 26 – May 28, 2023

Ride is a Canadian neo-Western drama television series created by Rebecca Boss and Chris Masi that aired on Hallmark Channel from March 26 to May 28, 2023. The series stars Nancy Travis as a matriarch of a rodeo dynasty who tries to save their Colorado ranch. In November 2023, the series was canceled after one season.

== Cast and characters ==
=== Main ===
- Nancy Travis as Isabel McMurray, a matriarch of the family who leads their Colorado ranch following the death of her husband
- Tiera Skovbye as Missy McMurray, a former rodeo queen, trick rider and Austin's widow
- Beau Mirchoff as Cash McMurray, Isabel's middle son. A Marine Corp veteran who returns home in the pilot episode. Cash has been secretly in love with Missy for years.
- Sara Garcia as Valeria Galindo, Missy's best friend who mysteriously leaves town the day Austin dies
- Jake Foy as Tuff McMurray, the youngest son of the McMurray family, an out-and-proud gay man. Tuff was Austin's bullfighter and was acting as so when Austin died. Tuff later becomes Cash's cage fighter.
- Tyler Jacob Moore as Gus Booker. A love interest of Missy's.

=== Supporting ===
- Marcus Rosner as Austin McMurray, Isabel's eldest son and Missy's husband. A rodeo bull riding champion. Austin passes away in the pilot episode from a rodeo accident leaving his family to grieve and having to deal with his many secrets.
- Greg Lawson as Hank Hickson, Janice's father
- Rob Stewart as JB Wooten
- Alexandra Beaton as Janine Hickson, Hank's daughter and Missy's rival
- Vasilios Filippakis as Julian Katsaros
- Dylan Neal as Daniel Booker
- Victor Okyei as Nic Burton
- Isla Spencer as Sophie
- Barb Mitchell as Grace Booker

=== Guest stars ===
- Holly Deveaux as Polly

== Production ==
The series written by husband and wife writing team Rebecca Boss and Chris Masi with showrunner Sherri Cooper-Landsman was ordered in June 2022. In August 2022, Nancy Travis, Tiera Skovbye, Beau Mirchoff, Sara Garcia, Jake Foy and Tyler Jacob Moore cast as regulars. Filming began in Calgary, Alberta in Canada on August 4. On November 17, 2023, it was reported that the series was canceled after one season.

== Episodes ==
No.	Title	Directed by	Written by	Original release date	U.S. viewers (millions)
1	"Legend of the Fall"	Paolo Barzman	Chris Masi & Rebecca Boss	March 26, 2023	1.31
2	"Rodeo and Juliet"	Paolo Barzman	Chris Masi & Rebecca Boss	April 2, 2023	1.04
3	"The McMurray Curse"	Sara St. Onge	Emily Silver	April 9, 2023	0.94
4	"Estella"	Sara St. Onge	Mark Haroun	April 16, 2023	1.16
5	"When It Rains..."	Paolo Barzman	Jen Rivas-DeLoose	April 23, 2023	0.94
6	"Your Cheatin' Heart"	Paolo Barzman	Alejandro Alcoba	April 30, 2023	1.19
7	"Ride or Die"	Bruce McDonald	Sherri Cooper & Jennifer Levin	May 7, 2023	0.90
8	"Speak Now or Forever Hold Your Peace"	Bruce McDonald	Alexandra Zarowny	May 14, 2023	1.04
9	"Truths Laid Bare"	Paolo Barzman	Alexandra Zarowny & Sherri Cooper	May 21, 2023	0.84
10	"Andalusians"	Paolo Barzman	Chris Masi & Rebecca Boss	May 28, 2023	1.07

== Release ==
Ride aired on Hallmark Channel from March 26 to May 28, 2023, premiering on CTV Drama Channel in Canada on the same day. The series made its broadcast television premiere on January 22, 2024 on The CW.
