= Night of the Zoopocalypse =

2024 French-Canadian-Belgian-American animated film

- Theatrical release poster
- Directed by: Rodrigo Perez-Castro; Ricardo Curtis
- Written by: James Kee; Steven Hoban
- Based on: ZOOmbies by Clive Barker
- Produced by: Steven Hoban; Mark Smith; Wes Lui; Joe Iacono; Yohann Comte; Pierre Mazars; Carole Baraton; Cloé Garbay; Bastien Sirodot
- Starring: Gabbi Kosmidis; Scott Thompson; Paul Sun-Hyung Lee; David Harbour
- Edited by: Matt Ahrens; Gilad Carmel
- Music by: Dan Levy
- Production companies: Copperheart Entertainment; Anton Capital Entertainment; Charades; UMedia; Mac Guff; IDL Films; House of Cool
- Distributed by: Apollo Films (France); Distri7 (Benelux); Elevation Pictures (Canada)
- Release dates: October 6, 2024 (57th Sitges Film Festival); January 29, 2025 (France); February 19, 2025 (Belgium); March 7, 2025 (United States and Canada)
- Running time: 92 minutes
- Countries: Canada; France; Belgium
- Languages: English; French
- Box office: $16 million

Night of the Zoopocalypse (originally titled as Night of the Zoombies) is a 2024 animated comedy horror film directed by storyboard artists Rodrigo Perez-Castro and Ricardo Curtis (who also served as storyboard supervisors of the film while Perez-Castro served as its design supervisor), written by James Kee and producer Steven Hoban; inspired by a concept by one of the film's executive producers and Hellraiser creator Clive Barker, loosely based on his unpublished short story "ZOOmbies". The film follows a group of animal survivors in a zoo trying to survive a zombie outbreak when a virus carried on a meteor turns various zoo creatures into slobbering mutant zombies.

It premiered at the 57th Sitges Film Festival on October 6, 2024, then being released in France by Apollo Films on January 29, 2025, Belgium on February 19, 2025, and in the United States and Canada by Viva Kids and Elevation Pictures on March 7, 2025, receiving positive reviews.

== Plot ==
In Vancouver, British Columbia in the early 1990s, a young timber wolf named Gracie lives with her pack at Colepepper Zoo, a massive animal theme park. The pack's paranoid elder, Gramma Abigale, trains them for any upcoming "disasters" and warns them never to trust the other animals.

One evening, as the zoo closes for the day, the pack witnesses a new animal being transferred to an enclosure. That night, a meteor crashes into the zoo, landing at the Kuddle Korner petting zoo, where a pink rabbit eats it and becomes infected with a virus.

Gracie escapes her damaged enclosure to investigate the crash and encounters the rabbit, which is incubating in a giant pod. Suddenly, a zombie arm emerges from the pod and attacks her. She narrowly escapes, only to come face to face with the new animal, a gruff mountain lion named Dan, who instinctively attacks her. Both Gracie and Dan are tranquilized by an oblivious zookeeper, who places them in the veterinary station for the night.

Meanwhile, the rabbit emerges from the pod as a "Gum-Beast", a zombified mutant with gelatinous skin. The rabbit, dubbed "Bunny Zero", spreads her infection across the zoo. Gracie, Dan, and four other animals - Xavier, a factitious red ruffed lemur; Felix, an egotistical proboscis monkey; Frida, a feisty capybara; and Ash, a sarcastic ostrich - escape being infected. They are attacked by Fred, an infected gorilla and Felix's abandoned enclosure mate, prompting them to split up and flee into the utility tunnels. Gracie and Dan flee into the open, while the others shelter in the gift shop.

Gracie decides to head back to her enclosure and forces Dan to protect her on the way in exchange for the zoo card key. Along the way, they are joined by Poot, an uninfected baby pygmy hippopotamus. They arrive at the enclosure to find that the rest of the pack has already been turned. They head back, only to be spotted by the Gum-Beasts when the others accidentally power up the zoo. During the chaos, Felix abandons his group to the Gum-Beasts, while Gracie, Dan and Poot are attacked by Fred, who merges with a Gum-Beast giraffe that infects Dan. The Gum-Beast Dan attacks Gracie until he is seemingly cured by being submerged in a security office sink filled with soap and water. Afterward, Dan coldly rejects Gracie's idea to join the others and leaves with the card key.

At the gift shop, Gracie and Poot reunite with Ash, Frida, and Xavier to cure the Gum-Beasts, while Felix steals the key from Dan. Felix is attacked by a swarm of infected tree frogs, only for Dan to rescue him to reclaim the key. Felix successfully appeals to Dan for the card key but is infected by the tree frogs before he can even use it. Meanwhile, Gracie and the others plan to cure the Gum-Beasts by luring them into Dan's enclosure and flooding it with soap and water. Dan returns to help the group, and the plan seemingly succeeds. However, the Gum-Beasts instead merge into a gigantic amalgam, which absorbs everyone but Gracie and Dan, who flee into the gift shop, shortly before the amalgam destroys it.

Dan and Gracie are attacked by the infected Poot, who accidentally activates a snow globe with a built-in music box and returns to normal. Gracie recognizes the melody from the music box as the Zoo's theme song, which plays at the clock tower every 7 o'clock. She recalls that the same song was played on the radio when Dan was cured. Realizing that the song itself is the cure, she decides to activate the clock tower.

After the amalgam absorbs Dan, Gracie rushes to the clock tower while Poot distracts the amalgam. The Gum-Beast Felix tries to ambush Gracie, but she successfully activates the clock tower. The music from the song destroys the amalgam and restores the other animals to normal.

In the aftermath, Fred forgives Felix for abandoning him, Ash and Xavier become best friends, and Abigale, along with the rest of the pack, begins to trust the other animals. Meanwhile, Dan leaves the zoo for the wild but gives Gracie the key in case she decides to join him.

== Voice cast ==
- Gabbi Kosmidis as Gracie, a young timber wolf who is burdened by her life in the zoo and the de facto leader of the survivors.
- David Harbour as Dan, a gruff mountain lion who is determined to return to the wild, which slowly alienates him from Gracie and the others. He is temporarily infected by the mutants.
- Scott Thompson as Ash, a sarcastic and skeptical ostrich who is always annoyed by Felix's selfishness but has a soft spot for Frida and Xavier, the latter of whom he later becomes best friends with.
- Paul Sun-Hyung Lee as Felix, an egotistical and selfish proboscis monkey who arrogantly thinks he is the only mature one of the group. He is temporarily infected by the mutants.
- Pierre Simpson as Xavier, an eccentric, movie-obsessed red ruffed lemur. He later becomes Ash's best friend.
  - Bill, one of Gracie's brothers, who is also assimilated by the mutants.
- Heather Loreto as Frida, a fiery, Spanish-accented capybara who is also irritated with Felix's selfishness.
  - Security Guard
- Kyle Derek as Fred, a Western Lowland Gorilla who lives in the monkey area with Felix. He is later infected by the mutants.
- Christina Nova as Poot, a childish baby pygmy hippopotamus who is mostly oblivious to the situation and the danger the mutants pose. She is temporarily infected by the mutants.
- Bryn McAuley as Bunny Zero, a rabbit who, after accidentally eating the meteorite, becomes the deranged leader of the mutants.
  - Mutant
- Carolyn Scott as Gramma Abigale, an elderly timber wolf and Gracie's paranoid grandmother who trains the pack for "disaster." She is later infected by the mutants.
  - Scott also voices the Colepepper Zoo Announcer when it's closing time at the zoo.
- Rob Tinkler as Maynard, one of Gracie's brothers, who is also assimilated by the mutants.
  - Roy, one of Gracie's brothers, who is also assimilated by the mutants.
  - Mutant
  - Monkey
  - Joey
- Joshua Graham as Hank, one of Gracie's brothers, who is also assimilated by the mutants.

== Production ==
In Spring 2014, the original idea from Clive Barker was a graphic novel aimed at adult audiences and would follow a child who gets trapped in a zoo during a zombie outbreak. When the idea was shifted to the animated feature by Copperheart Entertainment, the story of it changed to focus on how the final version looked and putting a focus on a wolf and a mountain lion working together to stop a virus from infecting the zoo animals into gummi mutants, making the zombie animals less mature-stylized to make them undead while balancing out the family humor of the film. In 2015, Steven Hoban announced that Clive Barker's short story "ZOOmbies" had been optioned for a feature film.

=== Animation and design ===
The film was initially to be animated by Tangent Animation and Mac Guff under its original title Night of the Zoombies; however, with Mac Guff still intact, production was shifted to the Montreal-based studio L'Atelier Animation, who animated the film alongside Mac Guff's Brussels facilities. Storyboard and pre-production was provided at the Toronto-based studio House of Cool while character design was provided by the Iranian artist Hadi Tabasi. During production, the choice was made to only give some of the animals a realistic fur texture as a creative decision to show the difference between the mutant and normal characters, as well as a way to cut costs. The choice was also made to give the film a low-budget horror film aesthetic, which was accomplished by using lighting and fog.

== Music ==
Dan Levy was brought on to compose the score for the film. The soundtrack was released on January 29, 2025, during the film's release in France. Included in the soundtrack are two versions of an original song within the film, "Goodbye", which was composed by Levy and Yorina Bosco with lyrics by George Axon, Ed Roth, and film writer and producer Steven Hoban.

== Release ==
Night of the Zoopocalypse had its premiere on 57th Sitges Film Festival on October 6, 2024, and was first released in France on January 29, 2025, then in Belgium on February 19, and in the United States and Canada by Viva Kids and Elevation Pictures on March 7, 2025. In February 2025, before the film's release in the US, Viva Kids announced a UK distribution from Cantilever Media, under Kazoo Films, following their successful partnership from one of their films, The Amazing Maurice (2022), and was released in cinemas at the UK on October 10. The film went on digital April 4, 2025 one month after the film's release. The film was released in Australia and New Zealand on October 16.

== Reception ==
The film received a 88% rating of over 34 reviews on Rotten Tomatoes. The critics consensus reads, "Night of the Zoopocalypse delightfully threads the needle as a child-friendly introduction to horror, delivering a gentle amount of good scares while dazzling the eye with its neon hues."

Pierre Simpson and Gabbi Kosmidis won the awards for Outstanding Voice Performance at the ACTRA Toronto Awards in 2026.
