= Gabbi Kosmidis =

Greek-born Canadian voice actress

Gabbi Kosmidis is a Greek/Canadian actor, known for their on camera and voice over work, particularly the parts of Caroline Stewart in Fellow Travelers (miniseries), Gracie in Night of the Zoopocalypse and Isabel Armstrong in Unicorn Academy.

== Biography ==
Kosmidis was raised in Greece and grew up in Saronida. They came to Canada when they were 10 and moved to Toronto to pursue acting, graduating from Humber College's theatre arts program.

They are part of the LGBTQIA2 community and identify as nonbinary.

== Notable performances ==
=== Film ===
- In 2024, Kosmidis voiced the lead role of Gracie (a timber wolf) in the animated film Night of the Zoopocalypse. Rodrigo Perez-Castro, one of the film's directors, said, "We auditioned a lot of people to voice our lead, Gracie. When we heard Gabbi's voice, we immediately knew she would be perfect". A reviewer in the film's target audience said that "Kosmidis really brings the character to life through her voice acting". Kosmidis won an ACTRA Toronto award (in the Outstanding Performance – Gender Non-Conforming or Female Voice category) in 2026 for their performance.

=== Television ===
- In 2023, billed as Gabriella Kosmidis, they voiced the main role of Isabel Armstrong in Netflix's Unicorn Academy.

=== Video games ===
- In 2020, they voiced Hestia in the video game Immortals Fenyx Rising.
