= Unicorn Academy =

Canadian fantasy TV series (2023–)

- Genre: Adventure; Action; Fantasy
- Created by: Michelle Lamoreaux; Robert Lamoreaux
- Directed by: Cassi Simonds
- Creative director: Alexandra Kavalova
- Starring: Sara Garcia; Sadie Laflamme-Snow; Gabriella Kosmidis; Kari Wong; Kamaia Fairburn; Kolton Stewart
- Country of origin: Canada
- Original language: English
- No. of seasons: 6
- No. of episodes: 33

Production
- Executive producer: Laura Sreebny
- Producers: Mike G. Moore; Sarah Williams
- Running time: 23–75 minutes
- Production companies: Spin Master Entertainment; Mainframe Studios

Original release
- Network: Netflix
- Release: November 2, 2023 – present

Unicorn Academy is a Canadian animated television series produced by Spin Master Entertainment for Netflix and animated by Mainframe Studios. The first season was premiered on Netflix on November 2, 2023. It was renewed for a second season, which was released on June 27, 2024. The third season was released on April 9, 2025. The fourth season was released on November 13, 2025, as part of Netflix’s Christmas lineup. A spin-off entitled Secrets Revealed was released on March 19, 2026. The second season of Secrets Revealed was released on October 8, 2026.

The series made its linear premiere on Nickelodeon on July 6, 2025.

The series is based on the children's book series of the same name written by Julie Sykes and Linda Chapman.

== Premise ==
When a dark force threatens to destroy Unicorn Island, a brave teen and her five schoolmates must rise up to protect their beloved magical academy.

== Voice cast ==
=== Main ===
- Sara Garcia as Sophia Mendoza, a 14-year-old girl with an independent, rebellious personality.
- Sadie Laflamme-Snow as Ava Banji, a quirky, extroverted girl who always sees the best in people.
- Kamaia Fairburn as Layla Fletcher, an anxious intellectual who's new to riding. She enrolled in Unicorn Academy because she thought it was a cover for a government conspiracy.
- Gabriella Kosmidis as Isabel Armstrong, an energetic athlete whose diligence is matched only by her desire to succeed.
- Kari Wong as Valentina "Val" Furi, a girl who was formerly an aloof snob due to her slowly overcoming her corrupting qualities and is willing to protect her peers. Her ancestors founded Unicorn Academy, so she has a big legacy to live up to.
- Kolton Stewart as Rory Carmichael, a warmhearted prankster with a bad habit of saying whatever comes to mind. His only riding experience comes from riding dirt bikes, but he eagerly accepts the adventures that come with being a Unicorn Rider.
- Anna Mirodin as Zaya, Ravenzella‘s niece and the princess of Grimoria.

=== Unicorns ===
==== Main ====
- Wildstar, Sophia's unicorn and she has light magic. She powered up with rainbow vision to track someone or something and gets wing magic.
- Leaf, Ava's unicorn and she has plant magic. She powered up with an all seeing butterfly that she can control and see through to spy or scout ahead from a safe distance and gets wing magic.
- Glacier, Layla's unicorn and she has ice magic. She powered up to freeze time to blast on anything or anyone and gets wing magic.
- River, Isabel's unicorn and he has water magic. He powered up with a bubble for him, Isabel, and her friends to breathe underwater and gets wing magic.
- Cinder, Val's unicorn and he has fire magic. He powered up with super fiery speed and gets wing magic.
- Storm, Rory's unicorn and she has weather magic. She powered up with a flying lightning patch and gets wing magic.

==== Supporting ====
- Ethera, Ms. Evelyn Primrose's unicorn and he has illusion magic.
- Rhapsody, Ms. Rosemary's unicorn and she has musical magic.
- Rush, Ms. Wildwood's unicorn and she has speed magic.
- Ghost, Ms. Furi's unicorn and he has teleportation magic.
- Leviora, Mr. Tansy's unicorn and she has levitation magic.
- Smidgen, Jacinta's unicorn and he has shrink magic.
- Twinkle Socks, Delia's unicorn and she has tracking magic.
- Encore, Serena's former unicorn and he has duplicate magic.
- Mary-Lou aka her real name Solitaire, Marta's unicorn she's a horse back home but she returned at unicorn island she was a unicorn and she has healing magic.
- Skywind, Solaira Furi's unicorn and he has air magic and wing magic.

==== Minor ====
- Grim Unicorn, Ravenzella's unicorn and an unnamed unicorn made of Grim Magic.

==== Baby Unicorns ====
- Starjoy, a baby unicorn.
- Justin, a baby unicorn.
- Sherbet, a baby unicorn.
- Dusty, a baby unicorn.

=== Villains ===
- Jennifer Hale as Ravenzella, the queen of Grimoria.
- Ian Ronningen as Ash, Ravenzella's evil ogre henchman.
- Ana Sani as Crimsette, Ravenzella's evil dark sprite henchman.
- Deven Mack as Lazul, a crystal golem who was Ravenzella's former general.
- Tajja Isen as Tabaditha, a plant-like fairy that was freed from Grimoria, and unleashes plant powers that drain unicorn magic.
- Shannon Chan-Kent as Serena Furi, a traitorous member of the Furi family, a glamorous pop icon, and former unicorn rider who gets the power to hypnosis and she uses it to take control over the Academy. Her unicorn is Encore and has illusion magic.

=== Minor ===
- Roman Pesino as Marco Mendoza, Sophia's younger brother.
- Sophia Walker as Whispering Voices (voice sound effects)
- Jonah Wineberg as Danny, an student of Unicorn Academy who was sent home because a unicorn didn't choose him and wanted a second chance, but he reforms and learns to do things even when he isn’t a unicorn rider.
- Jane Luk as Mona Furi, a former unicorn rider and the mother of Ms. Furi and the grandmother of Valentina Furi. She has an eyepatch on her left eye because of Lazul.
- Michael Kash as Samuel "Sam" Crawford, a former unicorn rider and used to be Glacier’s rider before she met Layla.
- Paul Van Dyck as Fernakus, a dwerpin spy who has betrayed Unicorn Academy and works for Ravenzella then reforms and reunites with his family, he was Frella's brother.
- Addison Holley as Frella, a dwerpin and Fernakus’ sister.
- Jonathan Tan as Timble, a dwerpin who delivers gifts to people and unicorns.

=== Supporting ===
- Monica Rodriguez Knox as Marta Mendoza, Sophia's mother and unicorn rider.
- Carlos Diaz as Miles Mendoza, Sophia's long lost father and former unicorn rider.
- Rosemary Dunsmore as Ms. Evelyn Primrose, a kindly headmistress of Unicorn Academy. In season 2, she was a mysterious masked figure called the Star Snatcher with the help of Ethera.
- Mayko Nguyen as Ms. Furi, a Unicorn Academy's stern, emotionally restrained vice-principal. She is Valentina's aunt and one of many legacy students from their family.
- Katherine Stewart as Fate Fairies, are glowing, small fairies that help show unicorns and riders bond with each other. They are found on Unicorn Island, and all are from Fate Fairy Island.
- Sophia Walker as Ms. Wildwood, a riding teacher of Unicorn Academy.
- Dakota Ray Hebert as Ms. Rosemary, a teacher at Unicorn Academy. She teaches how to take care of unicorns.
- Derek McGrath as Mr. Tansy, a teacher at Unicorn Academy. He’s the bibliotheca from Unicorn Academy.
- Déjah Dixon-Green as Jacinta, is Delia's best friend who befriends Valentina.
- Addison Holley as Delia, is Jacinta's best friend and roommate, who befriends Valentina.
- Aiden Dawn as Jamie

== Episodes ==
=== Series overview ===
Series overview
Season	Episodes	Originally released
1	9	November 2, 2023
2	10	June 27, 2024
3	1	April 9, 2025
4	1	November 13, 2025
5	8	March 19, 2026
6	4	October 8, 2026

=== Chapter 1 (2023) ===
No. overall	No. in season	Title	Directed by	Written by	Original release date
1	1	"Unicorn Academy"	Andrew Tan, Florian Wagner, and Cassandra Mackay	Adam Wilson, Melanie Wilson LaBracio, and Julie Sykes	November 2, 2023
At Unicorn Academy, regular teen Sophia has a lot to learn about fantastical creatures, but a dark force threatens to return and destroy unicorn magic.
2	2	"The Hidden Temple"	Andrew Tan, Florian Wagner, and Craig George	Lila Scott, Julie Sykes, and Michelle Lamoreaux	November 2, 2023
While riding the Skyberry Trail, Wildstar gets spooked by grim magic, sending the group racing to a long-forgotten temple full of mysteries and danger.
3	3	"The Race"	Andrew Tan, Florian Wagner, and Craig George	Han-Yee Ling, Julie Sykes, and Michelle Lamoreaux	November 2, 2023
Miss Primrose accelerates the students' training by sending them to an advanced obstacle course; however, competition may get in the way.
4	4	"The Book of Grim"	Unknown	Kelsey Calaitges and Robert Lamoreaux	November 2, 2023
To learn more about grim magic, Sophia, Ava and Layla sneak into the library after hours to borrow a restricted book that proves to be too powerful.
5	5	"Under Starglow Lake"	Unknown	Robert Lamoreaux and Janae Hall	November 2, 2023
When grim magic contaminates the academy's water supply, the unicorns risk losing their power unless Sophia can save Starglow Lake with an unlikely ally.
6	6	"The Vision Pool"	Unknown	Robert Lamoreaux	November 2, 2023
Eager to decode the message from the Whispering Willows, Sophia skips party planning to visit the Vision Pool - right after promising Ava she wouldn't.
7	7	"The Broken Gem"	Unknown	Robert Lamoreaux and Janae Hall	November 2, 2023
The Sapphires try everything to get Sophia and Ava to stop fighting, but they've got bigger problems, as two dastardly henchmen are after the grimstone.
8	8	"Ravenzella's Revenge"	Unknown	Kelsey Calaitges and Robert Lamoreaux	November 2, 2023
As the academy teachers gear up to battle a powerful foe, they forbid their students from leaving the dorms. But one rider doesn't follow the rules.
9	9	"Mended Hearts"	Unknown	Robert Lamoreaux and Lila Scott	November 2, 2023
Without the help of their teachers, the students must work together to take on the evil Ravenzella all by themselves. Unicorn Academy depends on it! And Sophia forgives Ava for upsetting her about the Vision Pool.

=== Chapter 2 (2024) ===
No. overall	No. in season	Title	Directed by	Written by	Original release date
10	1	"Under The Fairy Moon"	Unknown	Laura Sreebny	June 27, 2024
While gathering starburst flowers for the Fairy Moon ball, an accident breaks Isabel's trust in River, allowing a mysterious stranger to step in.
11	2	"Year of the Unicorn"	Unknown	Megan Gonzalez	June 27, 2024
On a Sapphire camping trip, a constellation that only appears every five years sends a special surprise down to Earth. But something troubles Wildstar...
12	3	"Star Showers"	Unknown	Unknown	June 27, 2024
Ava throws a party for a foal that's been causing chaos around campus while Sophia investigates her father's connection to the Unicorn Constellation.
13	4	"Wildstar's Dream"	Unknown	Unknown	June 27, 2024
Using a sleepover at the stables as their cover, the Sapphires sneak out in search of the crown stars. But they're not the only ones looking.
14	5	"Legacies"	Unknown	Unknown	June 27, 2024
A legendary unicorn rider visits campus, stirring tensions between Sophia and Valentina. Layla gets jealous when Glacier reunites with an old friend.
15	6	"Mounting Pressure"	Unknown	Kelsey Calaitges	June 27, 2024
Ms. Wildwood tasks the Sapphires with keeping wild unicorns safe from a volcano, which Sophia uses as an opportunity to search for another crown star.
16	7	"The Wrong Crowd"	Unknown	Unknown	June 27, 2024
Sophia races to Starglow Lake to battle the Star Snatcher for the last crown star. Back at the dorms, Rory tries out for a secret society of pranksters.
17	8	"The Final Test — Part 1"	Unknown	Megan Gonzalez	June 27, 2024
For their final test, the students must infiltrate ogre-guarded ruins and rescue a hostage before the last bell rings... or risk immediate expulsion.
18	9	"The Final Test — Part 2"	Unknown	Unknown	June 27, 2024
Working together unlocks a new bond for the Sapphire riders — and with it, new abilities. Then, Valentina comes clean to Sophia about the crown stars.
19	10	"Grimoria's Return"	Unknown	Unknown	June 27, 2024
Sophia's good intentions lead to catastrophic events. Now the fate of Unicorn Island depends on the Sapphires — and the one test they dare not fail.

=== Chapter 3 (2025) ===
No. overall	No. in season	Title	Directed by	Written by	Original release date
20	1	"Legendary Summer"	Cassi Simonds	Lila Scott	April 9, 2025
Wanting to be like her idol over summer break, Layla ventures into Grimoria awakening a spirit that wields the power to suck magic from the island. She must learn from her mistakes and unite with Sophia and her friends to save the island.

=== Chapter 4 (2025) ===
No. overall	No. in season	Title	Directed by	Written by	Original release date
21	1	"Winter Solstice"	Unknown	Kelsey Calaitges and Rachel Forman	November 13, 2025
When the annual delivery of festive gifts doesn't arrive from Dwerpin Village, the Unicorn Riders of Sapphire Dorm set out on a snowy adventure to solve the mystery and save Winter Solstice and learn the true meaning of the holiday.

=== Secrets Revealed: Chapter 1 (2026) ===
No. overall	No. in season	Title	Directed by	Written by	Original release date
22	1	"Un-Welcome Back"	Unknown	Unknown	March 19, 2026
Back at the academy, Sophia wrestles with her guilt about the past as a dazzling Fairy Tiara sparks a quest for six gems to defend the island and could this be related to the secret passageway that the Sapphires discover in their dorm?
23	2	"The Fairy Gemstones"	Unknown	Unknown	March 19, 2026
Valentina tells the tale of how unicorn magic began as the crew finds a map showing where the gems are, pointing to Whispering Willows and Prism Beach.
24	3	"Sneaky Snookers"	Unknown	Unknown	March 19, 2026
With the next Fairy Gemstone on the line, an intense training game against the Rubies turns dangerous — and the Sapphires test how far they'll go to win.
25	4	"Sick and Fired"	Unknown	Unknown	March 19, 2026
While Val's sick in bed, the crew sets out on a swashbuckling quest up Mount Equus that brings grim illusions, forcing the Sapphires to trust each other.
26	5	"The Grimorian Gambit"	Unknown	Unknown	March 19, 2026
Drawn into Grimoria in search of the final gem, the Sapphires face dark enchantments and a leadership clash that puts their unicorns and mission at risk.
27	6	"Big Trouble"	Unknown	Unknown	March 19, 2026
Wildstar's brush with grim magic brings a healer with a familiar face, while a hurtful betrayal leaves Sophia with a choice that could change everything.
28	7	"The Solaira Festival"	Unknown	Unknown	March 19, 2026
With the Solaira Festival afoot, Sophia braves dark magic and a secret alliance to save her friends as Serena's spellbinding show puts everyone in peril.
29	8	"The Fairy Tiara"	Unknown	Lila Scott	March 19, 2026
While Serena and Ravenzella battle for the Fairy Tiara, the Sapphires learn its true power. Is their bond the key to restoring Unicorn Island's magic?

=== Secrets Revealed: Chapter 2 (2026) ===
No. overall	No. in season	Title	Directed by	Written by	Original release date
30	1	"Winged Wonders"	Unknown	Unknown	October 8, 2026
31	2	"Seeing Red"	Unknown	Unknown	October 8, 2026
32	3	"Tale of the Vampicorn"	Unknown	Unknown	October 8, 2026
33	4	"Forced Friendly Fun"	Unknown	Unknown	October 8, 2026

== See also ==
- Spin Master
- List of Netflix original programming
