= Kyra Leroux =

Canadian actress

- Born: April 30, 2002 (age 24); Vancouver, British Columbia, Canada
- Occupations: Actress, dancer, singer
- Years active: 2009-present

Kyra Leroux (born September 30, 2002) is a Canadian actress, dancer, and singer.

== Early life ==
Leroux was born in 2002 in Vancouver, British Columbia. She started acting at the age of 7.

== Career ==
In 2020, after graduating acting school, Leroux appeared in multiple TV shows made for kids and teenagers, such as: The Quaranteens and Julie and the Phantoms. During 2021 Leroux appeared in the TV show Schmigadoon!. Additionally in 2021, Leroux appeared in the Netflix series Riverdale as Britta Beach.

In 2022, Leroux played Anne Shirley in the musical Anne of Green Gables. In 2022 Leroux also played Lisa-Karen in the Netflix series Firefly Lane.

In 2024, Leroux played in the TV movie, Sugarplummed, where she played Nina.

In 2025, Leroux played Sam Handerson in the NBC series, The Hunting Party. In the show she played Melissa Roxburgh's adopted daughter.

== Personal life ==
Leroux has 2 cats. She speaks French fluently and even competed in French competitions when she was younger.

== Filmography ==
Television

Year	Title	Role	Notes
2009	Psych	Pippi Longstocking	Episode: "Let's Get Hairy"
2018	Blurt	Classmate Girl	TV movie
2018	Once Upon a Time	Yarrow	1 episode
2018	Six	Friend #1	1 episode
2020	The Quaranteens	Various roles	1 episode
2020	Julie and the Phantoms	Dirty Candy Singer #4	2 episodes
2021	Schmigadoon!	Carrie	3 episodes
2021	Brand New Cherry Flavor	Tess Nathans	1 episode
2021	The J Team	Jess	
2021	Christmas Takes Flight	Chloe	TV movie
2021–2022	Riverdale	Britta Beach	18 episodes
2022–2023	Firefly Lane	Lisa-Karen	9 episodes
2023	Monster High 2	Demi Boovais	TV movie
2024	Lego Dreamzzz: Trials of the Dream Chasers	Miya	Voice role; 1 episode
2024	Sugarplummed	Nina	TV movie
2025	School Spirits	Gretchen	Season 2
2025	The Hunting Party	Sam Henderson	3 episodes

=== Theatre ===
Year	Title	Role	Director	Notes
2016	Music Man	Gracie Shin	Barbara Thomasic	
2022	Anne of Green Gables	Anne Shirley	Barbara Thomasic	Main role

|2025 |Anne of Green Gables the Musical |Anne Shirley | rowspan="1" |Erin McGrath | |-
