= Jake Foy =

Canadian actor

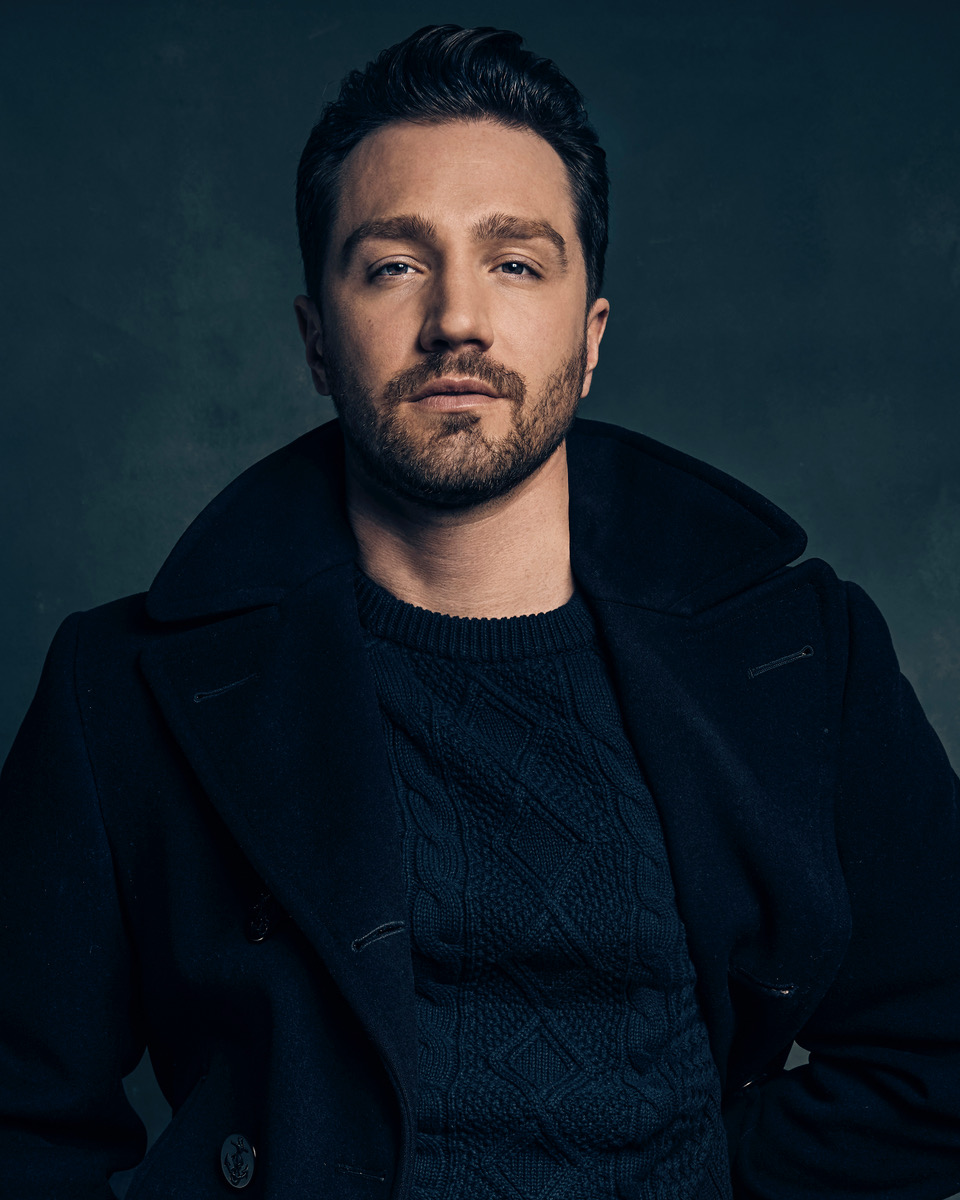
- Born: November 1, 1990 (age 35); Niagara Falls, Ontario, Canada
- Education: Sheridan College
- Occupation: Actor / Director
- Years active: 2014–present
- Website: www.jakefoy.com

Paul Jacob Foy (born November 1, 1990) is a Canadian actor. He is best known for his role as Tuff McMurray in the family rodeo dynasty series Ride, his role as King James in Reign, and his role as Felix Silva in Designated Survivor.

== Early life and education ==
Foy was born in Niagara Falls, Ontario.

Foy's first professional contract was a production of High School Musical: on Stage!, and afterwards spent three years in Sheridan College's prestigious Music Theatre performance program, wherein he was cast in the original workshop casts of Broadway-Bound Smash-Hit Canadian Musical Come From Away .

== Career ==
Foy made his onscreen debut in 2014, when he made his short film debut as a lead role in Miranda. Foy appeared in episodic roles in the television shows: Arrow, Minority Report, Murdoch Mysteries, Reign, Frankie Drake Mysteries, In The Dark, Batwoman and Billy the Kid.

In 2016, Foy appeared as USSE Bridge Crew in the sci-fi film Star Trek Beyond, which was premiered in Sydney on July 7, 2016, and was released in the United States on July 22, 2016, by Paramount Pictures.

In 2019, Foy appeared on the third season of the political thriller drama series Designated Survivor, his character is named as Felix Silva. On the same year, Foy starred with Jocelyn Hudon in the romantic comedy TV film Eat, Drink and be Married, where he played the lead role of Charlie Warren.

In 2020, Foy appeared in the romantic drama television film Love in Store, his character is named as Ryan Costa. In 2021, Foy was cast in the romantic comedy television film A Little Daytime Drama, he played the role of Stewart. In 2022, Foy appeared in the romantic comedy TV film When Christmas Was Young, where played the role of Deejay.

Jake stars as Tuff McMurray in Ride, an American neo-Western drama television series created by Rebecca Boss and Chris Masi. It premiered on March 26, 2023, on Hallmark Channel. On the same year, Foy appeared in the psychological thriller miniseries Wilderness, which he played the role of Anton.

== Personal life ==
Jake resides in Los Angeles, California, and is engaged to his partner, Nicolas La Traverse.

== Filmography ==
Year	Title	Role	Notes
2014	Miranda	Joseph	Short film
2015	Arrow	Intern	Episode: "Beyond Redemption"
2015	Minority Report	Nellas' Lover	Episode: "Honor Among Thieves"
2016	Ariel Unraveling	Joel	Short film
2016	Star Trek Beyond	USSE Bridge Crew	Actor
2016	Murdoch Mysteries	Wesley Patten	Episode: "Bend It Like Brankenreid"
2017	Reign	King James	Episode: "All It Cost Her..."
2018	Frankie Drake Mysteries	Gambler	Episode: "Dealer's Choice"
2019	In The Dark	Guy	Episode: "Bait and Switch"
2019	Designated Survivor	Felix Silva	Recurring; 5 episodes
2019	Eat, Drink and be Married	Charlie Warren	TV Film
2020	Love in Store	Ryan Costa	TV Film
2021	Batwoman	Dad	Episode: "Power"
2021	A Little Daytime Drama	Stewart	TV Film
2022	Billy the Kid	Norm	Episode: "Antrim"
2022	God Willing	Gus Walcott	Short film
2022	When Christmas Was Young	Deejay	TV Film
2023	Ride	Tuff McMurray	Main role; 10 episodes
2023	Wilderness	Anton	Recurring; 3 episodes
2023	More Together	Convenience Store Clerk	Short film (uncredited)
2024	Allegiance	Kyle	Recurring; 3 episodes
2024	Sidelined: The QB and Me	Mr. Justin Douglas	
2025	The Wish Swap	Henry McMillan	Main role / TV film for Hallmark
2025	Palindrome (Shortfilm)	Ara	Short film
