= The Hunting Party (TV series) =

2025 American crime drama

- Genre: Procedural drama; Crime drama
- Created by: JJ Bailey
- Starring: Melissa Roxburgh; Nick Wechsler; Patrick Sabongui; Josh McKenzie; Sara Garcia
- Music by: Dan Romer
- Country of origin: United States
- Original language: English
- No. of seasons: 2
- No. of episodes: 23

Production
- Executive producers: Keto Shimizu; Thor Freudenthal; Jake Coburn; JJ Bailey; Michael Jones-Morales
- Producers: Jeff Rafner; Melissa Roxburgh
- Cinematography: Mirza; Mark Chow; Sarah Cawley; Mike Caracciolo; Anastas Michos
- Editors: Benjamin Bumgarner; Meghan Robertson; Marc Pattavina; Meghan Robertson; Todd Desrosiers; Kevin Mock; Matt Lawrence
- Running time: 42–43 minutes
- Production companies: All J Entertainment; Jake Coburn Productions; Universal Television

Original release
- Network: NBC
- Release: January 19, 2025 – May 7, 2026

The Hunting Party is an American procedural crime drama television series created by JJ Bailey for NBC. The series premiered on January 19, 2025, and revolves around a small investigative team assembled to track down and capture the most dangerous killers known to have just escaped from a top-secret prison whose existence is not known to the public.

In May 2025, the series was renewed for a second season, which premiered on January 8, 2026. In June 2026, the series was canceled after two seasons.

== Premise ==
After a prison hidden underneath the Wyoming countryside suffers an unexpected explosion, the nation's worst serial killers are once again at large. Former FBI profiler Rebecca, "Bex", Henderson is brought back into the fold alongside an elite team of soldiers, spies, and special agents to help track down and recapture these deadly criminals before they kill again. Thrust into a world of intrigue and conspiracy, Bex must grapple with not only her own complex past but also the enduring mystery of what was happening at this prison and who caused the explosion in the first place.

== Cast and characters ==
=== Main ===
- Melissa Roxburgh as Rebecca "Bex" Henderson, an FBI Special Agent and criminal profiler
- Nick Wechsler as Oliver Odell (season 1), Bex's former partner and lover
- Patrick Sabongui as Jacob Hassani, a CIA officer
- Josh McKenzie as Shane Florence, a prison officer at an underground silo known as The Pit in Cheyenne, Wyoming
- Sara Garcia as Maj. Jennifer Morales, an Army Intelligence officer

=== Recurring ===
- Zabryna Guevara as Elizabeth Mallory, the United States Attorney General
- Kari Matchett as Colonel Eve Lazarus, a high-ranking military officer and a former inmate of The Pit who is secretly Shane's mother
- Matt Frewer as Dr. Henry Dulles, a scientist and doctor who used to work in The Pit studying the inmates
- Siobhan Williams as Sarah Dulles, Dr. Dulles' daughter
- Luke Forbes as Jonathan Peck (season 2), an associate of Colonel Lazarus who is part of the Inmate Recovery Task Force

=== Special guest stars ===
- Eric McCormack as Ron Simms (season 2), a serial killer who preys on women who are searching for love
- Niecy Nash-Betts as Erica Burke (season 2), a detective who brought a serial killer to justice in the past
- Kelsey Grammer as Noah Cyrus (season 2), the leader of a Chicago-based doomsday cult known as the Thirteenth Hour
- John Corbett as Xander Wax (season 2), a biochemist who kills people by using lethal animal venoms

== Episodes ==
=== Series overview ===
| Season | Episodes | Originally released | |
| Season | Episodes | First released | Last released |
|---|---|---|---|
| 1 | 10 | January 19, 2025 | April 7, 2025 |
| 2 | 13 | January 8, 2026 | May 7, 2026 |

=== Season 1 (2025) ===
| No. overall | No. in season | Title | Directed by | Written by | Original release date | U.S. viewers (millions) |
|---|---|---|---|---|---|---|
| 1 | 1 | "Richard Harris" | Thor Freudenthal | JJ Bailey | January 19, 2025 | 3.05 |
An explosion at the Pit, a prison within a decommissioned missile silo in Cheyenne, Wyoming, kills many people but also releases several inmates who are death-row convicts, kept alive for illegal and unethical experimentation. Former FBI agent Rebecca ("Bex") Henderson is brought to J.M. Webb Air Force Base to help recapture them after being informed of the situation by United States Attorney General (AG) Elizabeth Mallory and Central Intelligence Agency (CIA) operative Jacob Hassani, who escorts her to the Pit, where they meet former Marine and prison guard Shane Florence. The first identified escapee is Richard Harris, a murderer who targeted blonde women, blinding them chemically before killing them. Bex, Hassani, and Shane track him to the home of Nicole Westin, who survived his attacks. However, they discover she is secretly his accomplice and pretended to be a survivor to escape prosecution. During the confrontation, Richard is shot and killed, while Nicole is exposed and arrested. Meanwhile, flashbacks reveal Bex left the Federal Bureau of Investigation (FBI) after witnessing her former partner, Oliver Odell, now head of security at the Pit, immolate a kidnapper to get information on a hostage, Samantha, who Bex later adopted as her daughter. Odell informs Bex that the explosion at the Pit was no accident.
| 2 | 2 | "Clayton Jessup" | Marcus Stokes | Keto Shimizu | February 10, 2025 | 2.87 |
Intelligence officer Jennifer Morales informs Bex that another escapee has been identified. The escapee, Clayton Jessup, is a murderer who poisoned entire families. Bex asks Odell to look into Eli Johnson, who Odell claims was never in the Pit. Tracking Clayton, the team finds he is kidnapping the actors from a PSA video he was shown in the Pit. Bex admits to Shane that Eli Johnson is the serial-killer father of her childhood best friend, who Bex herself turned in. They find Clayton with the captives at the house of Dr. Lansing, Clayton's former therapist, whom he crippled, and Shane discreetly takes photos of Lansing's former colleagues before he is subdued by Clayton. Bex saves the captives and manages to distract Clayton from killing Lansing long enough for Hassani to subdue him. Later, Hassani admits to Bex that there is evidence the explosion was deliberate. Back at the Pit, Odell allows Bex to meet Johnson, who taunts her about abandoning his daughter to die and lying about it. Odell tells Bex he covered that up because he knew Bex would be a good agent, while Hassani discovers Odell knew about the blast before it happened and took confidential information.
| 3 | 3 | "Lowe" | Kristin Windell | Michael Jones-Morales | February 17, 2025 | 3.12 |
Hassani and Odell separately ask Bex if she trusts the other. Another escapee, Brenda Lowe, who killed people trespassing on land she bought to rehabilitate the area's gray wolf population, is found. The team discovers the land was sold to a development company, which has turned it into a suburb. After killing again, Brenda contacts the team and claims she received letters from her lawyer that the land was safe. Bex calls Odell, who is in a meeting with the AG, who reveals the letters were faked to control Brenda's behavior. They discover Brenda has found that the wolves she defended have been euthanized, and she suffers a psychotic break, attacking a campground. Despite the local police becoming involved, the team manages to subdue Brenda. Hassani tells Bex there is no record of Odell's whereabouts during the two years between him leaving the FBI and starting work at the Pit. He shows her footage of Odell receiving a call and transferring classified files to a flash drive three minutes before the explosion. Odell meets a woman and tells her people are investigating him, and she asks him to let her handle it. Hassani believes the caller is behind the explosion.
| 4 | 4 | "Doctor Ezekiel Malak" | Blackhorse Lowe | Teleplay by : JJ Bailey; Story by : Jake Coburn | February 24, 2025 | 3.06 |
The team locates Ezekiel Malak, a hospital psychologist who killed patients by injecting them with digoxin. Hassani informs Bex that Odell received another call from his contact and asks her to plant a device on Odell's phone to get its GPS data. The team discovers how Malak is choosing his new victims, and saves a woman before Malak kills her. Bex realizes Malak is reviving his victims to ask them what they saw at the moment of death. They find Malak was treated by a Dr. Dulles, who Shane claims is dead. They realize Malak will steal digoxin from the nearest hospital, but he evades them and kidnaps Bex. He attempts to kill and resuscitate her to find out what she saw. The team realizes he has taken her to her hotel room, and they arrive and subdue him as she frees herself. Bex and Odell reconcile, and she gets his phone and plants the device. Bex and Hassani find that after the call, Odell went to a storage facility, which contains evidence that Odell and Sam have a relationship, and satellite coordinates of various locations, including the Pit. Shane visits Dr. Dulles at a retirement home, calling him "Dad".
| 5 | 5 | "Roy Barber" | Glen Winter | Teleplay by : Jake Coburn; Story by : JJ Bailey | March 3, 2025 | 2.69 |
Hassani informs Bex the coordinates are being investigated and asks her not to tell Odell before another escapee, Roy Barber, a police sketch artist who killed couples, is located. The team discovers that Barber has killed again, while Odell's contact informs him Hassani is looking into something called "Silo 12". They discover one of Barber's recent victims was the woman from one of the couples he killed before being arrested. Tracking Barber's movements, Bex realizes he only killed the men from the couples and set the women up with new identities. Barber escapes and finds another one of the women, now remarried, and kidnaps her and her husband. Hassani shows Bex satellite images of the coordinates, and they find one location, "Silo 12", has been doctored. The team tracks and apprehends Barber before he kills the couple. Bex informs him that they know how he tracked the women and will find them the same way he did and arrest them. Bex confronts Odell about his relationship with Sam, which she forgives him for, and tells Sam she is working with the FBI again. Mallory orders Hassani to stop looking into "Silo 12", and is revealed to report to Odell's contact.
| 6 | 6 | "Arlo Brandt" | James Bamford | Michael Jones-Morales & Vinny Ferris | March 10, 2025 | 2.82 |
Bex asks Odell about "Silo 12" and calls him out for not trusting her. Dr. Dulles calls Shane "not his son" as the team locates another escapee, Arlo Brant, a serial killer who hoarded material possessions, eventually killing people and selling theirs to get more. Tracking Brandt to Missouri, the team discovers that he has been cured of his need for material possessions and is kidnapping people he believes define their lives by them to convert them to his way of thinking. They find him at an abandoned water treatment plant he has set up like the Pit, and recapture him. Returning to Wyoming, Shane checks in on Dr. Dulles, and when leaving, is seen by a woman named Sarah, who tells the staff she is Dr. Dulles' daughter, and he doesn't have a son. Having heard Bex talk Brandt down, Odell tells her that “Silo 12” is where inmates were taken for more extensive experimentation, as well as where the explosion started. He reveals that the call told him an armed security force, presumably the cause of the explosion, had breached the silo at the time, and Bex says they need to investigate.
| 7 | 7 | "Mark Marsden" | Rob Hardy | Rebecca Bellotto & Paula Sabbaga | March 17, 2025 | 2.91 |
Visiting Dr. Dulles, Shane is rejected by the nursing home staff, who now know the truth, and is followed by Sarah. Bex tells Hassani what Odell told her. They locate another escapee, Mark Marsden, who killed all his wives, and find he has kidnapped a woman named Carol, who once worked at the Pit. The team discovers Marsden was put through therapy involving fake weddings, with Carol as the wife. Odell gives Bex an access code for "Silo 12", and they realize Carol has fallen in love with Marsden. The team finds that Marsden has killed again, leaks the information, and realizes the couple is headed to Reno to quickly marry. Hearing the story, Carol contacts them, telling Bex she and Marsden are in love, and they send her the videos of his weddings. When he says the same thing he said to his other wives at the altar, she rejects him, and he has a breakdown. He becomes violent, but the team arrives, and Bex kills him. They decide not to charge Carol. Later, Sarah confronts Shane, while Bex, Hassani and Odell investigate "Silo 12", finding evidence of a massacre, and that the "experimentation" had an audience.
| 8 | 8 | "Denise Glenn" | Nicole Rubio | Keto Shimizu & David Loong | March 24, 2025 | 2.26 |
Shane tells Sarah he was adopted through a study run by Dr. Dulles, who may know who his real parents are. Odell tells Bex and Hassani the research at "Silo 12" was presented to pharmaceutical company executives. They receive word of another murder committed using the method of Denise Glenn, a former university professor and Pit inmate still in custody, and find proof that the killer spoke to her to learn the exact method, confirming it is another escapee. Bex and Odell interrogate Denise. Hassani and Shane find out how the killer got Denise's methods. Morales shows Bex and Odell that other inmates watched Denise sculpt as treatment, and they trick her into revealing the killer's identity, Craig Martin, a stalker who killed women with explosives. Bex persuades Denise to reveal Craig's ultimate plan, but realizes she lied and figures out the real plan is to blow up her former lecture hall. Hassani and Shane stop Craig. Hassani tells Bex and Odell the company involved with the explosion was Whitmore Pharmaceuticals, whose CEO, James Whitmore, is acquainted with the AG. Sarah gives Shane tapes of his sessions with Dr. Dulles. Denise is taken to Odell's contact, who has her killed.
| 9 | 9 | "Tom Beecher" | Shana Stein | Rebecca Bellotto & Paula Sabbaga | March 31, 2025 | 2.21 |
Bex, Hassani and Odell investigate Whitmore, realizing he killed an employee who knew about the Pit. The team is notified that Tom Beecher, a man who would kidnap two women and kill one in front of the other, whom Bex herself arrested, has been located. When he calls the first woman's family to taunt them, they arrest him at a hotel with a different woman, and realize the first is somewhere else. Bex interrogates an uncooperative Beecher. Odell asks his contact to tell Bex and Hassani everything, and she reveals Beecher was surgically experimented on by Dr. Dulles, which gave him anterograde amnesia. Realizing he developed a code to leave notes to himself to know what he did before, they reset his memory and release him in his hotel room to lead them to the missing woman, with Morales in place of the original second captive. However, Beecher figures out the setup and kills himself in front of the team. They figure out the code from the music he was humming and a recording of the first woman, finding her alive. Sarah shows Shane from the tapes that his biological mother tried to meet him once. Bex meets Odell's contact.
| 10 | 10 | "Jenna Wells" | Thor Freudenthal | JJ Bailey & Jake Coburn | April 7, 2025 | 2.02 |
Odell's contact tells Bex and Odell that Whitmore created a drug to control empathy, which the military wanted control of, and Whitmore orchestrated the breach to repossess the drug and its test subjects, destroying evidence with the explosion. Sarah tells Shane that Dr. Dulles is in a coma. Shane asks Morales to identify his mother's voice from the tape. Jenna Wells, a pharmacist who poisoned her patients, is located. Tracking her, the team finds that Whitmore's security is also looking for her. They realize Jenna is attending a party at Whitmore Pharmaceuticals to target the CEO. Jenna sedates everyone at the party except Whitmore, and captures him. The team saves him, but he orders his security to keep Jenna, though afterward he collapses dead, poisoned by her. A shootout occurs, and Jenna escapes, while Hassani is shot and hospitalized. The AG reprimands Bex, Odell, and Shane, and shuts the team down. At headquarters, Jenna captures Odell. Bex, realizing what happened, informs Shane and heads there, distracting her until Shane ambushes and kills her. Morales identifies the voice as Colonel Eve Lazarus, Odell's contact. Dr. Dulles, awake, implies to Sarah that Lazarus is a former Pit prisoner. Odell collapses, poisoned by Jenna.

=== Season 2 (2026) ===
| No. overall | No. in season | Title | Directed by | Written by | Original release date |
|---|---|---|---|---|---|
| 11 | 1 | "Ron Simms" | Thor Freudenthal | JJ Bailey & Jake Coburn | January 8, 2026 |
After a few months disbanded, the remaining members of the team get back together after threatening the AG with going public on all the details of The Pit and the escape, as well as revealing the ineffectiveness of the other teams she tried to field in their absence. Their first case after reforming is Ron Simms, a killer who paralyzes women with an injection so he can spend time with them how he wants, ultimately leading to their demise. At The Pit, he is treated with traditional and animal therapy to learn how to behave and interact with people. After being released, he seems to find and attract women, but things always go awry when he gets honest about who he was, hoping that they will accept him as he is. When the women panic, he goes back to his old ways of injecting them with a paralytic. As the team figures out that he's finding women on a dating app, they use the app to lure him to a coffee shop, only for him to turn the tables and capture Bex. In a barn where he is accompanied by and takes care of rabbits, Ron has kept his former psychologist imprisoned and brings Bex in to make a new documentary to prove to the world he's a changed man. The team figures out where he took Bex and rescues her before she almost strangles him. At the end of the episode, Col. Lazarus takes over the recovery operation from the AG.
| 12 | 2 | "Adrian Gallo" | Thor Freudenthal | Rebecca Bellotto & Vinny Ferris | January 15, 2026 |
Bex, Hassani, Shane, and Morales team up to secretly investigate Col. Lazarus's employer. In Los Alamos, New Mexico, a suspect named Adrian Gallo kills a neighbor and targets Erika Burke, the lead detective on his case. Burke escapes unharmed and joins the team's pursuit. During a warehouse stakeout, Burke displays a suspiciously detailed knowledge of the human resins used by the killer. Meanwhile, Peck provides Morales with a hard drive from Dr. Charles's office. Burke leaves the team, meeting Gallo at a local hotel. She confesses to committing the three murders Gallo was blamed for, then kills him. Tracking her to her home, the team engages Burke in an intense gunfight, resulting in her death. They subsequently discover multiple human remains hidden inside her walls. On the flight home, Shane comforts a conflicted Bex. Later, Shane reveals that while Col. Lazarus has a highly decorated history, there are absolutely no records of her existence prior to attending West Point.
| 13 | 3 | "Zack Lang" | Marcus Stokes | JJ Bailey & Jake Coburn | January 22, 2026 |
Zack Lang murders a low-income man, deviating from his usual pattern of targeting wealthy victims. The team discovers Lang possesses a $60 million Bitcoin account. Investigating his childhood home, they learn the Pit replicated his bedroom as a "rage room" to manage his trauma. Driven by his father's past rejection after Lang killed the family cat, Lang is now hunting men who resemble his father. After another murder, the team traces a victim's employer to a sales office staffed entirely by lookalikes of Lang's father. Lang corners a coworker, Damon, and attacks him when Damon reacts with horror to his psychopathic confessions. The team arrives at a warehouse containing multiple replicas of Lang's childhood bedroom. Bex locates them, convinces Lang to free Damon, and subdues Lang after a brutal fight. Lang is recaptured. Later, Bex discovers a news article about a champion high school runner who murdered three teenagers, identifying her as Caitlin Taylor—otherwise known as Col. Lazarus.
| 14 | 4 | "Amanda Weiss" | Glen Winter | Holly Harold & Paula Sabbaga | January 29, 2026 |
Bex informs Morales that Col. Lazarus is actually former Pit inmate Caitlin Taylor. Meanwhile, escaped serial killer Amanda "The Masseuse" Weiss kidnaps a woman named Tiffany, holding her at a remote cabin. Seeking insight, Bex consults Dr. Erikson and learns how the Pit used a trauma-bonding protocol involving a proxy inmate named Alice to manipulate Weiss. Weiss mimics this tactic by pretending to be a fellow captive to bond with Tiffany. When Tiffany briefly escapes and is recaptured, Weiss heads to town for medical supplies. Bex intercepts her by posing as "Alice," convincing Weiss to drive her back to the cabin. Upon arrival, they find Tiffany has fled again; Bex draws her weapon and successfully talks Weiss down while Shane rescues Tiffany in the woods. Later, Shane reveals to Bex that he joined the Pit to track down his biological mother, unaware she is Lazarus. Concurrently, Lazarus murders Dr. Dulles.
| 15 | 5 | "Noah Cyrus" | Geoff Shotz | David Loong & Zeke Goodman | February 26, 2026 |
Presumed dead for a decade, serial killer and cult leader Noah Cyrus resurfaces in Aurora, starting a new cult with follower Susie "Puppy" Perkins. Utilizing a psychological "white room" therapy protocol from the Pit, Cyrus has brainwashed himself into believing he is a deity. Realizing Cyrus remains one step ahead, Bex suspects an internal mole. The cult hijacks the emergency broadcast system, with Perkins announcing an event commemorating the tenth anniversary of the Thirteenth Hour Massacre. The team storms the broadcast studio, where Bex shoots Cyrus. Meanwhile, at the command center, Cyrus's recruit, Norm, gains control of a bomb. Upon learning Cyrus murdered his brother, Norm wavers, allowing Morales to successfully seize the detonator. Concurrently, Bex deliberately keeps Shane in the dark regarding his mother's true identity. As Cyrus is transported to a detention facility, a mysterious black ops unit ambushes the convoy and assassinates him.
| 16 | 6 | "Lou Kaplan" | Marcus Stokes | Michael Jones-Morales & Emilio Ortega Aldrich | March 5, 2026 |
Following the ambush on Cyrus's convoy, Col. Lazarus assigns Hassani to manage all inmate transport. Meanwhile, killer Lou Kaplan targets social media influencers, forcing "Baking with Becky" to confess her internet persona is a fraud before murdering her. Tracking a supposed influencer collaboration, the team discovers the suspect's residence. While Lazarus covertly discovers that Bex uncovered her identity as Caitlin Taylor, the team encounters an AI avatar at Kaplan's house that deploys a virus against the command center. Kaplan broadcasts himself overdosing a fitness influencer named Rory, whom the team manages to rescue. Kaplan corners his former boss, SnapMax CEO Linda Cranston, forcing her to film a confession detailing the platform's divisive engagement algorithms. The team arrives in time to rescue Cranston and shoot Kaplan. In the aftermath, Peck and Morales share a drink, Hassani discovers his credentials were used to re-route Cyrus's doomed convoy, and Lazarus pays an ominous visit to Shane's home.
| 17 | 7 | "Sidney Fairfax" | Lisa Robinson | Paula Sabbaga & Rebecca Bellotto | March 12, 2026 |
Col. Lazarus reveals to Shane that she is his biological mother. Meanwhile, the team hunts escaped Pit inmate Dr. Sidney Fairfax, a rogue neuroscientist mutilating the brains of his victims. They discover Fairfax previously ran unethical brain experiments on Pit inmates to control violent behavior. Seeking leverage on Fairfax, Shane investigates the residence of the late Dr. Dulles, where Fairfax ambushes and takes him hostage. Fairfax reveals that Shane was born in the Pit and served as his childhood test subject, and that he intends to resume his experiments. Guided by Lazarus, Bex and Hassani locate a hidden level beneath the facility to rescue Shane. Afterward, Lazarus tells Bex she was reformed by the Pit's protocols and now serves her country. Unconvinced, Bex warns Morales and Hassani that Lazarus is the most dangerous sociopath she has ever encountered.
| 18 | 8 | "Elliot Carr" | Laura Belsey | Emilio Ortega Aldrich & Vinny Ferris | April 2, 2026 |
Shane joins Col. Lazarus for dinner, where she defends the Pit's psychological methods. Meanwhile, the team tracks escaped serial killer Elliot Carr, known as the "Connecticut Cobbler," who fashions luxury shoes from human skin. Shifting tactics, Carr now poses as an EMT to harvest skin from deceased victims. The team intercepts a macabre package Carr sent to a surviving past victim, discovering a pair of shoes crafted from Carr's own skin as a bizarre apology. Realizing Carr is abducting trauma patients to conduct self-inflicted skin grafts using their bodies, the team tracks him down alongside a captured surgeon. Bex uses Carr's underlying remorse to de-escalate the standoff; Carr attempts suicide but is successfully taken into custody. Later, Hassani alerts Bex that three high-profile inmates have been transferred out of the new prison facility without a paper trail, prompting Bex to question if they were secretly released or "graduated" the program.
| 19 | 9 | "Colette Akins" | Stephen Kay | Arika Lisanne Mittman | April 9, 2026 |
Following a positive update regarding Shane's dinner with Col. Lazarus, the team tracks escaped Pit inmate Colette Akins. Haunted by her dead mortician father's voice due to historical Pit brain experiments, Akins abducts vocalists who resemble him, trapping her latest target, Marty, in a coffin. Following her trail to a karaoke bar, Shane subdues Akins when she attempts to take a hostage. To locate Marty, the team places an uncooperative Akins inside a coffin, where Bex uses a voice modulator to impersonate Akins's deceased sister, Liza. The interrogation successfully forces Akins to reveal Marty's location, leading to his rescue. Afterward, Hassani uncovers paperwork proving that Lazarus personally pushed through the administrative authorization to hire Shane at the Pit. This critical discovery reveals that Lazarus has known about Shane's identity and connection to her for significantly longer than she previously led him to believe.
| 20 | 10 | "Byron May" | Bethany Rooney | Holly Harold & David Loong | April 16, 2026 |
Hassani reveals to Shane that Col. Lazarus bypassed his failed psychological evaluation to force his hiring at the Pit. Meanwhile, the team tracks escaped serial killer Byron May, the true "East Side Ripper." They discover May's crimes were wrongfully attributed to an innocent man, Victor Rosa, who is currently incarcerated. May has shifted his methods to "phrogging"—secretly living inside his targets' homes undetected. He intercepts sympathy letters intended for Rosa and targets the authors, believing their forgiveness is a sign to strike. May targets Rosa's son, Eric, infiltrating his home under the guise of returning a lost dog. The team breaches the residence just as Eric uncovers May's true identity, allowing Shane to shoot and neutralize May. The team coordinates with local police to process May's fingerprints, officially securing Rosa's exoneration and release. Afterward, Hassani convinces Shane that Lazarus orchestrated the ambush on Cyrus's convoy, prompting Shane to seek definitive proof.
| 21 | 11 | "Dylan Miles" | Michael Smith | Michael Jones-Morales & Vinny Ferris | April 23, 2026 |
Escaped serial killer Dylan Miles (Kevin McHale) surfaces to recreate "Debbie" and "Peter," the therapy puppets he used in the Pit. After shooting a doll maker for his tools, Dylan hunts down the real-life inspirations for the figures. The task force trails him to his final target: Jeff, a comic who found fame mocking Dylan's life with a lookalike puppet. Dylan brings Jeff to former comedy club where they use to perform at and publicly beats him. The team arrives as Dylan prepares to execute Jeff. Bex de-escalates the crisis by convincing Dylan that forcing Jeff to live with public humiliation is a harsher punishment than death. Dylan spares Jeff but attempts suicide, though Shane tackles and subdues him. Meanwhile, Morales drops a recovering Peck home post-surgery. While Peck is heavily medicated, Morales spots a severe shoulder bruise consistent with rifle recoil. Suspicious, she searches his laptop and discovers body-cam footage proving Peck was responsible for executing Cyrus during the convoy ambush.
| 22 | 12 | "Nancy Albright" | Shana Stein | Teleplay by : Hallie Cohen & Neil Binnie; Story by : Andrew Clabaugh | April 30, 2026 |
The team confronts a recovering Peck at his home regarding his hidden body-cam footage about the attack on Cyrus' convoy, but he refuses to talk. They are then tasked with looking for escaped killer Nancy Albright (Jamie Chung), whose psychopathic urge to kill for a drug-like high was supposedly "cured" by the Pit and is searching for a loophole to experience that sensation again. After surveillance footage captures her purchasing street heroin, the team tracks her down in Boston. They discover she is posing as a recovery sponsor, befriending vulnerable former addicts only to force-feed them narcotics. She then conducts blood transfusions on her incapacitated victims to ingest the high through their blood, resulting in a fatal overdose for her first target. The team raids her location and saves a second victim, capturing Nancy alongside three accomplices who are unexpectedly revealed to be vengeful friends of her original victim. Later on, Peck confesses to the team about his role in the convoy attack, but exposes Colonel Eve Lazarus's overarching conspiracy: continuing the "Graduate Program," a clandestine military initiative created in the Pit designed to weaponize high-functioning serial killers into controllable field assets.
| 23 | 13 | "Xander Wax" | Thor Freudenthal | JJ Bailey & Jake Coburn | May 7, 2026 |
The task force tracks escaped biochemist Xander Wax (John Corbett), a serial killer who uses lethal animal neurotoxins to stage random public executions. Following his time in the Pit, Xander was psychologically conditioned into a precision hitman. The team discovers a larger conspiracy orchestrated by Colonel Eve Lazarus, who sabotaged and destroyed the Pit to establish a black-market task force. Lazarus has been hoarding select high-functioning inmates at a clandestine facility to continue the illegal "Graduate Program." Armed with this knowledge, the team infiltrates the hidden prison. With remote camera access provided by Jonathan Peck, Jennifer Morales overrides the facility security network, liberating the team and the captive inmates. During the subsequent chaotic gunfight, Bex Henderson is wounded, and a vengeful Shane Florence confronts Lazarus. Shane ultimately spares his mother, but Bex fatally shoots Lazarus when she reaches for a weapon. Later, whistleblower Philip Beaumont confronts the team, revealing he leaked the Pit's existence to force its closure. Beaumont appoints Bex as head of the expanded recovery team to track down a vast network of remaining escapees, delivering a final warning: the Pit was not curing serial killers, but actively manufacturing them.

== Production ==
=== Development ===
In August 2022, it was announced J.J. Bailey had entered into an overall deal with Universal Television with the first project to be developed being procedural drama, The Hunting Party, created by Bailey and Jake Coburn. In February 2023, it was announced NBC had set up a writers room for the series with a formal straight-to-series order taking place one year after.

On May 12, 2025, NBC renewed the series for a second season. On June 2, 2026, NBC canceled the series after two seasons, but is slated to be shopped to other networks.

=== Casting ===
In May 2024, it was announced Melissa Roxburgh was cast as the show's lead. Later that same month, it was announced Patrick Sabongui, Josh McKenzie and Sara Garcia had joined the cast as series regulars. In June 2024, Nick Wechsler joined the cast as a series regular while Kyra Leroux was cast in a recurring role.

=== Filming ===
Filming in Vancouver for the first season of the series began on June 20, 2024, and concluded on November 19, 2024. Production moved to New York City for the second season, the premiere of which was moved to midseason after initially being scheduled for the fall.

== Broadcast ==
The series premiered on January 19, 2025, on NBC. The second season premiered on January 8, 2026.

== Reception ==
=== Critical response ===
On the review aggregator website Rotten Tomatoes, the series holds an 18% approval rating based on 11 critic reviews. The website's critics consensus reads, "Thrilling in theory but glaringly dull in execution, The Hunting Party plays it too fast and loose with its serial killer mayhem ideas, making it just another procedural in the sea of many." Metacritic, which uses a weighted average, assigned a score of 34 out of 100 based on 7 critics, indicating "generally unfavorable" reviews.

=== Ratings ===
Viewership and ratings per episode of The Hunting Party
| No. | Title | Air date | Rating/share (18–49) | Viewers (millions) | DVR (18–49) | DVR viewers (millions) | Total (18–49) | Total viewers (millions) | Ref. |
|---|---|---|---|---|---|---|---|---|---|
| 1 | "Richard Harris" | January 19, 2025 | 0.5/4 | 3.05 | 0.1 | 0.62 | 0.5 | 3.67 | |
| 2 | "Clayton Jessup" | February 10, 2025 | 0.2/3 | 2.87 | 0.1 | 1.78 | 0.4 | 4.65 | |
| 3 | "Lowe" | February 17, 2025 | 0.2/4 | 3.12 | 0.1 | 1.62 | 0.3 | 4.74 | |
| 4 | "Doctor Ezekiel Malak" | February 24, 2025 | 0.2/4 | 3.06 | 0.1 | 1.67 | 0.4 | 4.72 | |
| 5 | "Roy Barber" | March 3, 2025 | 0.2/3 | 2.69 | 0.1 | 1.71 | 0.3 | 4.41 | |
| 6 | "Arlo Brandt" | March 10, 2025 | 0.2/3 | 2.82 | 0.1 | 1.61 | 0.3 | 4.43 | |
| 7 | "Mark Marsden" | March 17, 2025 | 0.2/3 | 2.91 | 0.1 | 1.52 | 0.3 | 4.42 | |
| 8 | "Denise Glenn" | March 24, 2025 | 0.1/2 | 2.26 | 0.2 | 1.71 | 0.3 | 3.97 | |
| 9 | "Tom Beecher" | March 31, 2025 | 0.1/2 | 2.21 | 0.2 | 1.65 | 0.3 | 3.86 | |
| 10 | "Jenna Wells" | April 7, 2025 | 0.1/2 | 2.02 | 0.2 | 1.71 | 0.3 | 3.72 | |
