= Sara Garcia (Canadian actress) =

Canadian actress (born 1993)

Sara García
- Born: 26 July 1993 (age 33); Toronto, Ontario, Canada
- Citizenship: Canadian
- Education: Queen's University (B.A.); Etobicoke School of the Arts
- Occupation: Actress
- Years active: 2013–present
- Known for: The Hunting Party, Ride, Unicorn Academy

Sara Garcia (born 26 July 1993) is a Canadian actress known for her work in television, film, and voice acting. She is recognized for roles in series such as The Flash, Ride, NBC's The Hunting Party and the animated series Unicorn Academy.

== Early life and education ==
Sara Garcia was born and raised in Toronto. She is of multicultural heritage, with a father born in Uruguay and a mother of Lebanese and Scottish descent. Garcia attended the Etobicoke School of the Arts. She later earned a double major in Global Development and Theatre from Queen's University at Kingston, Ontario. Before pursuing acting full-time, she lived in Shanghai, China, for three years, where she taught English.

== Career ==
Garcia began her professional acting career upon returning to Canada. Her early television work includes a role on the FX series Man Seeking Woman. She gained wider recognition for her recurring role as Alexa Rivera/Fuerza on The CW's superhero series The Flash (2017–2018). In 2023, Garcia was cast as Valeria Galindo, a lead role in the Hallmark Channel family drama series Ride, a role she connected to through her Latin American heritage. She has also performed voice work for video games including Far Cry 6 and Starlink: Battle for Atlas. She also stars as the voice of Sophia Mendoza in the Netflix animated series Unicorn Academy. In May 2024, García was cast as a series regular in the NBC crime drama The Hunting Party.

== Personal life ==
Garcia is bisexual.

== Filmography ==
Year	Title	Role	Notes
2017–2022	The Flash	Alexa Rivera / Fuerza	Recurring role (6 episodes)
2022	True Fiction	Avery Malone	
2023	Ride	Valeria Galindo	Main role (10 episodes)
2023	The Good Doctor	Orion Garcia	Guest star (Season 6 Episode 18)
2023–present	Unicorn Academy	Sophia Mendoza (voice)	Main role
2025–present	The Hunting Party	Jennifer Morales	Main role (18 episodes)

== Awards and nominations ==
- 2025 – Nominee, ACTRA Toronto Award for Outstanding Performance – Gender Non-Conforming or Female Voice for Unicorn Academy
- 2025 – Nominee, Canadian Screen Award for Best Voice Performance for Unicorn Academy
- 2024 – Nominee, Canadian Screen Award for Best Performance, Animation for Unicorn Academy
