= 2020–21 United States network television schedule =

Television schedule for the fall of 2020

The 2020–21 network television schedule for the five major English-language commercial broadcast networks that air in the United States covers the prime time hours from September 2020 to August 2021. The schedule is followed by a list per network of returning series, new series, and series canceled after the 2019–20 television season.

Fox was the first to announce its fall schedule on May 11, 2020, followed by The CW on May 14, CBS on May 19, NBC on June 16, and ABC on June 17, 2020.

PBS is not included at all, as member television stations have local flexibility over most of their schedules and broadcast times for network shows may vary. Ion Television and MyNetworkTV are also not included because both network schedules comprise syndicated reruns (with limited original programming). This is the last season that The CW did not program primetime on Saturday evenings (however it does offer network programming on Saturdays in the following season).

New series are highlighted in bold.

On January 6, 2021, most of ABC, CBS and NBC's programming was preempted in favor of news coverage of the January 6 United States Capitol attack in Washington D.C.

Note: From July 23 to August 8, 2021, all NBC primetime programming was pre-empted for the coverage of the 2020 Summer Olympics in Tokyo, Japan.

All times are U.S. Eastern and Pacific Time (except for some live sports or events). Subtract one hour for Central, Mountain, Alaska, and Hawaii–Aleutian times.

Each of the 30 highest-rated shows is listed with its rank and rating as determined by Nielsen Media Research.

== Impact of the COVID-19 pandemic ==
Each of the major television networks in the United States had initially planned for their upfront presentations to be made to the public in mid-May, a tradition going back to the Golden Age of Television. Due to concerns caused by COVID-19, most major networks and cable network groups canceled their public upfront events due to both public health concerns, and stay-at-home orders which effectively prevented them from going forward. It was expected most of the upfront announcements would be either press releases or virtual video events via videotelephony, and could be delayed due to pilots being unable to be produced, along with an overall decline in advertising. NBC carried traditional upfront content on July 16, 2020, blended in as a part of 30 Rock: A One-Time Special, though a majority of the network's affiliates pre-empted the event (it aired the next day as a special airing across all of NBCUniversal's cable networks at the same time in primetime).

On May 1, the Television Critics Association cancelled its summer 2020 press tour, originally scheduled for July 28 through August 13 (during the now-rescheduled 2020 Summer Olympics), as the organization was unsure it could occur at all due to public gathering restrictions and an anticipated lack of any scripted programming output, even in pilot form, to promote by that time period. The TCA cancellation complicated any plans by the networks to build buzz about their upcoming schedules, while the move of the 2020 Summer Olympics to 2021 nullified any plans NBC had to use the Games to lead into their new television season.

Delays in production as a result of the pandemic resulted in many shows being pushed over from their intended Summer 2020 premieres. CBS was the first network to push the thirty-second season premiere of The Amazing Race as a part of its contingency plan to preserve programming for fall. The same day, ABC announced that it had delayed the sixteenth season of its summer staple series The Bachelorette to a tentative fall launch, while sister-series Bachelor in Paradise had been postponed indefinitely. The following month, Fox and The CW followed suit by announcing that both the networks would be delaying most of their original scripted premieres to a cycle beginning in January 2021, and their fall lineup would consist primarily of acquisitions and delayed summer series.

In light of further delays in production, CBS moved up S.W.A.T. to a fall premiere to replace Survivor, while the latter had been postponed its production of the forty-first season to spring 2021 and was replaced by aforementioned The Amazing Race. On August 26, 2020, the network further modified its schedule by deciding to push the premieres of all scripted programming to November and air acquired and encore programming in early fall instead. Similarly, NBC altered its schedule on August 12, 2020, by replacing The Voice with American Ninja Warrior on Monday nights.

On September 16, 2020, ABC announced that the network would not be moving forward with the second season of Stumptown, a decision that came in reversal to its May 2020 renewal. COVID-related production delays that would not have allowed the series to be ready for telecast before April 2021 (the end of the broadcast season) were cited as the primary reason behind the cancellation.

Because of the pandemic-related production halts, this is the third time in the history of American television where the start of the television season was delayed due to issues outside of the control of the major television networks; the last two instances occurred in the 1988–89 season (which was delayed due to the 1988 Writers Guild of America strike) and the 2001–02 season (which was affected by news coverage of the terrorist attacks on September 11, 2001), while the fourth would occur in the 2023–24 season, which was delayed due to the strikes involving the Writers Guild of America and SAG–AFTRA.

In spite of the fact that an effective vaccine for the COVID-19 virus was not available until the first few months of 2021, most scripted shows were able to resume production in the autumn of 2020. This was accomplished by having all cast and crew members take daily COVID-19 tests during production to ensure no transmission of the virus, not having fans in the audience during tapings, and often writing scenes to reduce the total number of people on set at a given time. The 2020–2021 season saw a diffused approach to COVID-19; some series acknowledged the pandemic and had storylines that addressed the issues from it, while others did not reference it at all. Chuck Lorre said publicly that his CBS shows would not take place in a setting where COVID-19 existed, something that he has stuck with going into 2023.

== Legend ==
- Light blue indicates local programming.
- Gray indicates encore programming.
- Blue-gray indicates news programming.
- Light green indicates sporting events.
- Light purple indicates movies.
- Red indicates series being burned off and other irregularly scheduled programs, including specials.
- Yellow indicates the top-10 most watched programs of the season.
- Cyan indicates the top-20 most watched programs of the season.
- Magenta indicates the top-30 most watched programs of the season.

== Sunday ==
Network		7:00 p.m.	7:30 p.m.	8:00 p.m.	8:30 p.m.	9:00 p.m.	9:30 p.m.	10:00 p.m.	10:30 p.m.
ABC	Fall	America's Funniest Home Videos		Supermarket Sweep		Who Wants to Be a Millionaire		Card Sharks	
ABC	Winter	America's Funniest Home Videos		Who Wants to Be a Millionaire		Card Sharks		The Rookie (29/7.11) (Tied with Station 19)	
ABC	Mid-winter	America's Funniest Home Videos		American Idol (25/7.42)				The Rookie (29/7.11) (Tied with Station 19)	
ABC	Late winter	America's Funniest Home Videos		American Idol (25/7.42)				Who Wants to Be a Millionaire	
ABC	Spring	America's Funniest Home Videos		American Idol (25/7.42)				The Rookie (29/7.11) (Tied with Station 19)	
ABC	Summer	America's Funniest Home Videos		Celebrity Family Feud		The Chase		To Tell the Truth	
CBS	Fall	NFL on CBS (4:25 p.m.)	60 Minutes (6/10.73)		CBS Sunday Night Movies (continued until 11:30 p.m.)				
CBS	Mid-fall	NFL on CBS (4:25 p.m.)	60 Minutes (6/10.73)		NCIS: Los Angeles (22/7.80)		NCIS: New Orleans (27/7.22)		NCIS (R) (continued until 11:30 p.m.)
CBS	Winter	60 Minutes (6/10.73)		**The Equalizer** (4/12.07)		NCIS: Los Angeles (22/7.80)		NCIS: New Orleans (27/7.22)	
CBS	Summer	60 Minutes (6/10.73)		Big Brother		Love Island			
CBS	Late summer	60 Minutes (6/10.73)		Big Brother		**The Equalizer** (R)		NCIS: Los Angeles (R)	
The CW	Fall	Local programming		Pandora		Whose Line Is It Anyway? (R)		Local programming	
The CW	Mid-fall	Local programming		Pandora		The Outpost		Local programming	
The CW	Winter	Local programming		Batwoman		Charmed		Local programming	
The CW	Spring	Local programming		Legends of Tomorrow		Batwoman		Local programming	
The CW	Summer	Local programming		Legends of Tomorrow		**Wellington Paranormal**	Dead Pixels	Local programming	
The CW	Late summer	Local programming		Legends of Tomorrow		**Wellington Paranormal**	**Wellington Paranormal** (R)	Local programming	
Fox	Fall	Fox NFL (4:25 p.m.)	The OT	The Simpsons	Bless the Harts	Bob's Burgers	Family Guy	Local programming	
Fox	Winter	**Cherries Wild**	Bless the Harts	The Simpsons	**The Great North**	Bob's Burgers	Family Guy	Local programming	
Fox	Spring	The Simpsons (R)	Bless the Harts	The Simpsons	**The Great North**	Bob's Burgers	Family Guy	Local programming	
Fox	Summer	Duncanville (R)	**HouseBroken** (R)	The Simpsons	**The Great North**	Bob's Burgers	Family Guy	Local programming	
Fox	Late summer	Lego Masters (R)		The Simpsons	**The Great North**	Bob's Burgers	Family Guy	Local programming	
NBC	Fall	Football Night in America		NBC Sunday Night Football (8:20 p.m.) (continued to game completion) (1/16.50)					
NBC	Winter	Weakest Link (R)		The Wall (R)		Chicago Med (R)		Dateline NBC	
NBC	Late winter	The Voice (R)				Ellen's Game of Games		Good Girls	
NBC	Spring	Ellen's Game of Games (R)		Ellen's Game of Games		Zoey's Extraordinary Playlist		Good Girls	
NBC	Summer	NBC Sports programming							

== Monday ==
Network		8:00 p.m.	8:30 p.m.	9:00 p.m.	9:30 p.m.	10:00 p.m.	10:30 p.m.
ABC	Fall	Dancing with the Stars				**Emergency Call**	
ABC	Mid-fall	Dancing with the Stars				The Good Doctor (19/8.16) (Tied with Grey's Anatomy)	
ABC	Late fall	Monday Night Countdown	Monday Night Football (8:15 p.m.)				
ABC	Winter	The Bachelor				The Good Doctor (19/8.16) (Tied with Grey's Anatomy)	
ABC	Spring	American Idol				The Good Doctor (19/8.16) (Tied with Grey's Anatomy)	
ABC	Mid-spring	The Wonderful World of Disney				The Good Doctor (19/8.16) (Tied with Grey's Anatomy)	
ABC	Late spring	The Bachelorette				**The Celebrity Dating Game**	
ABC	Summer	Bachelor in Paradise				**The Ultimate Surfer**	
CBS	Fall	Big Brother		One Day at a Time		**Manhunt: Deadly Games**	
CBS	Late fall	The Neighborhood	Bob Hearts Abishola	All Rise		Bull (16/8.59)	
CBS	Spring	The Neighborhood	Bob Hearts Abishola	NCIS: New Orleans (R)		Bull (16/8.59)	
CBS	Summer	The Neighborhood	Bob Hearts Abishola	Young Sheldon (R)	**United States of Al** (R)	NCIS: Los Angeles (R)	
The CW	Fall	Whose Line Is It Anyway?	Whose Line Is It Anyway? (R)	Penn & Teller: Fool Us		Local programming	
The CW	Winter	All American		Black Lightning		Local programming	
The CW	Late winter	Bulletproof		Black Lightning		Local programming	
The CW	Spring	All American		Black Lightning		Local programming	
The CW	Late spring	All American		**The Republic of Sarah**		Local programming	
The CW	Summer	Roswell, New Mexico		**The Republic of Sarah**		Local programming	
The CW	Late summer	Roswell, New Mexico		Penn & Teller: Fool Us (R)		Local programming	
Fox	Fall	**L.A.'s Finest**		**Filthy Rich**		Local programming	
Fox	Late fall	**L.A.'s Finest**		**Cosmos: Possible Worlds**		Local programming	
Fox	Winter	9-1-1 (11/9.62)		9-1-1: Lone Star (15/8.71)		Local programming	
Fox	Late winter	9-1-1 (11/9.62)		America's Most Wanted		Local programming	
Fox	Spring	9-1-1 (11/9.62)		9-1-1: Lone Star (15/8.71)		Local programming	
Fox	Summer	Hell's Kitchen: Young Guns		**HouseBroken**	Duncanville	Local programming	
NBC	Early fall	American Ninja Warrior				Dateline NBC	
NBC	Fall	The Voice (17/8.40)				Weakest Link	
NBC	Winter	Ellen's Game of Games		The Wall		Weakest Link	
NBC	Late winter	The Voice (17/8.40)				**Debris**	
NBC	Spring	American Ninja Warrior				**Small Fortune**	
NBC	Summer	American Ninja Warrior				The Wall	

== Tuesday ==
Network		8:00 p.m.	8:30 p.m.	9:00 p.m.	9:30 p.m.	10:00 p.m.	10:30 p.m.
ABC	Fall	The Bachelorette				**Big Sky** (26/7.35)	
ABC	Winter	The Wonderful World of Disney				**Big Sky** (26/7.35)	
ABC	Mid-winter	To Tell the Truth		Black-ish	Mixed-ish	**Big Sky** (26/7.35)	
ABC	Late winter	To Tell the Truth		Black-ish	Mixed-ish	**Soul of a Nation**	
ABC	Spring	**Pooch Perfect**		Black-ish	Mixed-ish	**Big Sky** (26/7.35)	
ABC	Mid-spring	**Mike Tyson: The Knockout**				To Tell the Truth (R)	
ABC	Late spring	The Goldbergs (R)	**Home Economics** (R)	The Conners (R)	Black-ish (R)	To Tell the Truth (R)	
ABC	Summer	Bachelor in Paradise				**The Ultimate Surfer**	
CBS	Fall	NCIS (3/12.58)		FBI (5/10.98)		**The FBI Declassified**	
CBS	Mid-fall	NCIS (3/12.58)		FBI (5/10.98)		FBI: Most Wanted (14/8.83)	
CBS	Summer	NCIS (3/12.58)		Love Island		FBI: Most Wanted (14/8.83)	
CBS	Late summer	NCIS (3/12.58)		FBI (R)		FBI: Most Wanted (14/8.83)	
The CW	Fall	**Swamp Thing**		Tell Me a Story		Local programming	
The CW	Winter	Two Sentence Horror Stories		**Trickster**		Local programming	
The CW	Late winter	The Flash		**Superman & Lois**		Local programming	
The CW	Spring	The Flash		Supergirl		Local programming	
The CW	Late spring	The Flash		**Superman & Lois**		Local programming	
The CW	Summer	Stargirl		Supergirl		Local programming	
Fox	Fall	**Cosmos: Possible Worlds**		**Next**		Local programming	
Fox	Winter	The Resident		Prodigal Son		Local programming	
Fox	Late winter	**Holmes Family Effect**				Local programming	
Fox	Spring	The Resident		Prodigal Son		Local programming	
Fox	Late spring	Lego Masters		Mental Samurai		Local programming	
Fox	Summer	Lego Masters		**Fantasy Island**		Local programming	
NBC	Fall	The Voice (18/8.30)		This Is Us (13/9.32)		**Transplant**	
NBC	Winter	Zoey's Extraordinary Playlist		This Is Us (13/9.32)		**Nurses**	
NBC	Late winter	**Young Rock**	**Kenan**	This Is Us (13/9.32)		New Amsterdam	
NBC	Spring	The Voice (18/8.30)		This Is Us (13/9.32)		New Amsterdam	
NBC	Summer	America's Got Talent				Capital One College Bowl	

== Wednesday ==
Network		8:00 p.m.	8:30 p.m.	9:00 p.m.	9:30 p.m.	10:00 p.m.	10:30 p.m.
ABC	Fall	The Goldbergs	American Housewife	The Conners	Black-ish	**The Con**	
ABC	Mid-fall	The Goldbergs	American Housewife	The Conners	Black-ish	For Life	
ABC	Late fall	The Great Christmas Light Fight				For Life	
ABC	Winter	The Goldbergs	American Housewife	The Conners	**Call Your Mother**	For Life	
ABC	Late winter	The Goldbergs	American Housewife	The Conners	**Call Your Mother**	**The Con**	
ABC	Spring	The Goldbergs	**Home Economics**	The Conners	**Call Your Mother**	A Million Little Things	
ABC	Late spring	Press Your Luck		The $100,000 Pyramid		A Million Little Things	
ABC	Early summer	Press Your Luck		The $100,000 Pyramid		Card Sharks	
ABC	Summer	Press Your Luck		The $100,000 Pyramid		Match Game	
ABC	Late summer	Press Your Luck		The $100,000 Pyramid		**Superstar**	
CBS	Fall	Big Brother		Various programming		**48 Hours: Suspicion**	
CBS	Mid-fall	The Amazing Race		SEAL Team		S.W.A.T.	
CBS	Winter	Tough as Nails		SEAL Team		S.W.A.T.	
CBS	Spring	Kids Say the Darndest Things		SEAL Team		S.W.A.T.	
CBS	Late spring	Kids Say the Darndest Things		S.W.A.T. (R)			
CBS	Summer	Big Brother		Love Island		S.W.A.T. (R)	
CBS	Late summer	Big Brother		**House Calls with Dr. Phil**		48 Hours	
The CW	Fall	**Devils**		Coroner		Local programming	
The CW	Winter	Riverdale		Nancy Drew		Local programming	
The CW	Spring	**Kung Fu**		Nancy Drew		Local programming	
The CW	Summer	**Kung Fu**		In the Dark		Local programming	
The CW	Late summer	Riverdale		In the Dark		Local programming	
Fox	Fall	The Masked Singer (23/7.56)		**I Can See Your Voice**		Local programming	
Fox	Winter	**The Masked Dancer**		Name That Tune		Local programming	
Fox	Late winter	The Masked Singer (23/7.56)		**Game of Talents**		Local programming	
Fox	Spring	MasterChef: Legends		**Crime Scene Kitchen**		Local programming	
Fox	Summer	MasterChef: Legends				Local programming	
NBC	Fall	Chicago Med (9/9.74)		Chicago Fire (7/10.23)		Chicago P.D. (10/9.73)	
NBC	Summer	America's Got Talent		**Family Game Fight!**		Chicago P.D. (10/9.73)	

Note: Season 2 of Stumptown was originally scheduled to premiere in fall 2020, but it was canceled and was replaced by For Life.

== Thursday ==
Network		8:00 p.m.	8:30 p.m.	9:00 p.m.	9:30 p.m.	10:00 p.m.	10:30 p.m.
ABC	Fall	Celebrity Family Feud		Press Your Luck		Match Game	
ABC	Mid-fall	Station 19 (29/7.11) (Tied with The Rookie)		Grey's Anatomy (19/8.16) (Tied with The Good Doctor)		A Million Little Things	
ABC	Winter	**Celebrity Wheel of Fortune** (28/7.15)		The Chase		**The Hustler**	
ABC	Late winter	Station 19 (29/7.11) (Tied with The Rookie)		Grey's Anatomy (19/8.16) (Tied with The Good Doctor)		A Million Little Things	
ABC	Spring	Station 19 (29/7.11) (Tied with The Rookie)		Grey's Anatomy (19/8.16) (Tied with The Good Doctor)		**Rebel**	
ABC	Summer	**When Nature Calls with Helen Mirren**		Holey Moley		**The Hustler**	
ABC	Mid-summer	Holey Moley		**When Nature Calls with Helen Mirren**		**The Hustler**	
CBS	Fall	Big Brother		Various programming		**Star Trek: Discovery**	
CBS	Mid-fall	Young Sheldon (12/9.45)	**B Positive**	Mom	The Unicorn	**Star Trek: Discovery**	
CBS	Winter	Young Sheldon (12/9.45)	**B Positive**	Mom	The Unicorn	**Clarice**	
CBS	Spring	Young Sheldon (12/9.45)	**United States of Al**	Mom	**B Positive**	**Clarice**	
CBS	Summer	Big Brother		Love Island		Bull (R)	
CBS	Late summer	Big Brother		The Neighborhood (R)	**B Positive** (R)	Bull (R)	
The CW	Fall	Supernatural		The Outpost		Local programming	
The CW	Winter	**Walker**		Legacies		Local programming	
The CW	Summer	**Walker**		The Outpost		Local programming	
The CW	Late summer	Coroner		The Outpost		Local programming	
Fox	Fall	Fox NFL Thursday	Thursday Night Football (8:20 p.m.) (2/13.42)				
Fox	Winter	Hell's Kitchen: Las Vegas		**Call Me Kat**	Last Man Standing	Local programming	
Fox	Spring	Hell's Kitchen: Las Vegas		Last Man Standing	The Moodys	Local programming	
Fox	Mid-spring	Name That Tune (R)		Last Man Standing	**Let's Be Real**	Local programming	
Fox	Late spring	Beat Shazam		Lego Masters (R)		Local programming	
Fox	Summer	MasterChef: Legends (R)		**Call Me Kat** (R)		Local programming	
NBC	Fall	Superstore	**Connecting**	Law & Order: Special Victims Unit		Dateline NBC	
NBC	Mid-fall	Superstore	Superstore (R)	Law & Order: Special Victims Unit		Dateline NBC	
NBC	Winter	**Mr. Mayor**	Superstore	Law & Order: Special Victims Unit		Dateline NBC	
NBC	Spring	Manifest		Law & Order: Special Victims Unit		**Law & Order: Organized Crime** (21/7.83)	
NBC	Summer	Making It		Good Girls		**Law & Order: Organized Crime** (21/7.83)	
NBC	Late summer	Brooklyn Nine-Nine	Brooklyn Nine-Nine	Making It		**Law & Order: Organized Crime** (21/7.83)	

== Friday ==
Network		8:00 p.m.	8:30 p.m.	9:00 p.m.	9:30 p.m.	10:00 p.m.	10:30 p.m.
ABC	Fall	Shark Tank		20/20			
ABC	Spring	**Emergency Call**		20/20			
ABC	Summer	Shark Tank (R)		20/20			
CBS	Fall	The Greatest #AtHome Videos		Undercover Boss		Blue Bloods (8/10.16)	
CBS	Late fall	MacGyver		Magnum P.I. (24/7.48)		Blue Bloods (8/10.16)	
CBS	Summer	**Secret Celebrity Renovation**		Love Island		Blue Bloods (8/10.16)	
CBS	Late summer	**Secret Celebrity Renovation**		The Greatest #AtHome Videos		Blue Bloods (8/10.16)	
The CW	Fall	Masters of Illusion	Masters of Illusion (R)	**World's Funniest Animals**	**World's Funniest Animals** (R)	Local programming	
The CW	Late fall	The Christmas Caroler Challenge				Local programming	
The CW	Winter	Whose Line Is It Anyway?	Whose Line Is It Anyway? (R)	Penn & Teller: Fool Us		Local programming	
The CW	Spring	Charmed		Dynasty		Local programming	
The CW	Summer	Burden of Truth		Dynasty		Local programming	
Fox		WWE Friday Night SmackDown				Local programming	
NBC	Fall	American Ninja Warrior (R)				Dateline NBC	
NBC	Late fall	The Blacklist		Dateline NBC			
NBC	Summer	American Ninja Warrior (R)				Dateline NBC	

== Saturday ==
Network		8:00 p.m.	8:30 p.m.	9:00 p.m.	9:30 p.m.	10:00 p.m.	10:30 p.m.
ABC	Fall	Saturday Night Football					
ABC	Winter	NBA Countdown	NBA Saturday Primetime				
ABC	Late winter	Shark Tank (R)		American Idol (R)			
ABC	Spring	NBA Countdown	NBA Saturday Primetime				
ABC	Late spring	Celebrity Family Feud (R)		Various programming		The Good Doctor (R)	
ABC	Summer	America's Funniest Home Videos (R)		Shark Tank (R)		The Good Doctor (R)	
CBS	Fall	Crimetime Saturday				48 Hours	
CBS	Mid-fall	**Manhunt: Deadly Games**				48 Hours	
CBS	Late fall	Crimetime Saturday				48 Hours	
CBS	Spring	**Superstar Racing Experience**				48 Hours	
CBS	Summer	Crimetime Saturday				48 Hours	
Fox	Fall	Fox College Football (continued to game completion)					
Fox	Winter	9-1-1 (R)		Name That Tune (R)		Local programming	
Fox	Spring	The Masked Singer (R)		**Game of Talents** (R)		Local programming	
Fox	Late spring	Baseball Night in America (7:00 p.m.)				Local programming	
Fox	Summer	Fox Sports programming				Local programming	
NBC	Fall	Various programming		Ellen's Game of Games (R)		SNL Vintage	
NBC	Late fall	Ellen's Game of Games (R)		The Wall (R)		SNL Vintage	
NBC	Spring	Law & Order: Special Victims Unit (R)		**Law & Order: Organized Crime** (R)		SNL Vintage	
NBC	Late spring	NHL on NBC					
NBC	Summer	America's Got Talent (R)				Dateline Saturday Mystery	
NBC	Late summer	Various programming		America's Got Talent (R)			

== By network ==
Note: Series that were originally intended to air in 2019–20 but were delayed due to the COVID-19 pandemic are indicated using †.

=== ABC ===
Returning series:

- 20/20
- The $100,000 Pyramid^{†}
- American Housewife
- American Idol
- America's Funniest Home Videos
- The Bachelor
- Bachelor in Paradise^{†}
- The Bachelorette^{†}
- Black-ish
- Card Sharks^{†}
- Celebrity Family Feud
- The Chase (Note: Series revival; previously aired on Game Show Network from 2013–15)
- The Conners
- Dancing with the Stars
- For Life
- The Goldbergs
- The Good Doctor
- The Great Christmas Light Fight
- Grey's Anatomy
- Holey Moley
- Match Game
- A Million Little Things
- Mixed-ish
- Monday Night Countdown
- Monday Night Football
- NBA Countdown
- NBA Saturday Primetime
- Press Your Luck
- The Rookie
- Saturday Night Football
- Shark Tank
- Station 19
- Supermarket Sweep (Note: First primetime weekly version; last aired weekdays on PAX TV and previously aired in that format on ABC.)
- To Tell the Truth
- Who Wants to Be a Millionaire
- The Wonderful World of Disney

New series:

- **Big Sky**
- **Call Your Mother**
- **The Celebrity Dating Game**
- **Celebrity Wheel of Fortune**
- **The Con**
- **Emergency Call**
- **Home Economics**
- **The Hustler**
- **Mike Tyson: The Knockout**
- **Pooch Perfect**
- **Rebel**
- **Soul of a Nation**
- **Superstar**
- **The Ultimate Surfer**
- **When Nature Calls with Helen Mirren**

Not returning from 2019–20:

- Agents of S.H.I.E.L.D.
- The Bachelor Presents: Listen to Your Heart
- The Bachelor: The Greatest Seasons - Ever!
- The Baker and the Beauty
- Bless This Mess
- Don't
- Emergence
- Fresh Off the Boat
- The Genetic Detective
- The Great American Baking Show
- How to Get Away with Murder
- Kids Say the Darndest Things (moved to CBS)
- The Last Dance
- Modern Family
- Schooled
- Single Parents
- Stumptown
- United We Fall
- What Would You Do? (returned for 2023–24)

=== CBS ===
Returning series:

- 48 Hours
- 60 Minutes
- All Rise
- The Amazing Race^{†}
- Big Brother
- Blue Bloods
- Bob Hearts Abishola
- Bull
- CBS Sunday Night Movies
- FBI
- FBI: Most Wanted
- The Greatest #AtHome Videos
- Kids Say the Darndest Things (moved from ABC)
- Love Island
- MacGyver
- Magnum P.I.
- Mom
- NCIS
- NCIS: Los Angeles
- NCIS: New Orleans
- The Neighborhood
- NFL on CBS
- One Day at a Time (moved from Netflix) (Note: U.S. broadcast television premiere of season 4; previously aired on Pop and TV Land.)
- SEAL Team
- S.W.A.T.
- Tough as Nails
- Undercover Boss
- The Unicorn
- Young Sheldon

New series:

- **48 Hours: Suspicion**
- **B Positive**
- **Clarice**
- **The Equalizer**
- **The FBI Declassified**
- **House Calls with Dr. Phil**
- **Manhunt: Deadly Games** (Note: U.S. broadcast television premiere; a Charter Spectrum original series.)
- **Secret Celebrity Renovation**
- **Star Trek: Discovery** (Note: U.S. broadcast television premiere; a CBS All Access original series.)
- **Superstar Racing Experience**
- **United States of Al**

Not returning from 2019–20:

- Broke
- Carol's Second Act
- Criminal Minds
- Evil (moved to Paramount+)
- Game On!
- God Friended Me
- Hawaii Five-0
- Madam Secretary
- Man with a Plan
- Survivor (returned for 2021–22)
- Tommy

=== The CW ===
Returning series:

- All American
- Batwoman
- Black Lightning
- Bulletproof
- Burden of Truth
- Charmed
- The Christmas Caroler Challenge
- Coroner
- Dead Pixels
- Dynasty
- The Flash
- In the Dark
- Legacies
- Legends of Tomorrow
- Masters of Illusion
- Nancy Drew
- The Outpost^{†}
- Pandora^{†}
- Penn & Teller: Fool Us
- Riverdale
- Roswell, New Mexico
- Stargirl
- Supergirl
- Supernatural (Note: The series was scheduled to end in May 2020 but seven episodes remain unaired in its current fifteenth season due to suspensions in production and post-production, pushing the series finale to Fall 2020.)
- Tell Me a Story
- Two Sentence Horror Stories
- Whose Line Is It Anyway?

New series:

- **Devils**
- **Gilmore Girls: A Year in the Life** (Note: U.S. broadcast television premiere; a Netflix original series.)
- **Kung Fu**
- **The Republic of Sarah**
- **Superman & Lois**
- **Swamp Thing** (Note: U.S. broadcast television premiere; full series previously released on DC Universe.)
- **Trickster**
- **Walker**
- **Wellington Paranormal** (shared with HBO Max)
- **World's Funniest Animals**

Not returning from 2019–20:

- The 100
- Arrow
- Being Reuben
- Fridge Wars
- Katy Keene
- Killer Camp (returned for 2021–22)
- Mysteries Decoded (returned for 2021–22)
- Taskmaster (burned off on CW Seed)

=== Fox ===
Returning series:

- 9-1-1
- 9-1-1: Lone Star
- America's Most Wanted (Note: Series revival, previously aired by Lifetime in 2012; originated on Fox where it last aired in 2011.)
- Baseball Night in America
- Beat Shazam^{†}
- Bless the Harts
- Bob's Burgers
- Duncanville
- Family Guy
- Fox College Football
- Fox NFL Thursday
- Fox PBC Fight Night
- Hell's Kitchen^{†}
- Last Man Standing
- Lego Masters
- The Masked Singer
- MasterChef^{†}
- Mental Samurai^{†}
- The Moodys
- Name That Tune (Note: Series revival; first aired on NBC and CBS in the 1950s, before going into first-run syndication till 1985.)
- NFL on Fox
- The OT
- Prodigal Son
- The Resident
- The Simpsons
- Thursday Night Football
- WWE SmackDown

New series:

- **Call Me Kat**
- **Cherries Wild**
- **Cosmos: Possible Worlds** (Note: U.S. broadcast television premiere; full series previously aired on National Geographic.)
- **Crime Scene Kitchen**
- **Fantasy Island**
- **Filthy Rich**^{†}
- **Game of Talents**
- **The Great North**
- **Holmes Family Effect**
- **HouseBroken**
- **I Can See Your Voice**
- **L.A.'s Finest** (Note: U.S. broadcast television premiere of Season 1; a Charter Spectrum original series.)
- **Let's Be Real**
- **The Masked Dancer**
- **Next**^{†}

Not returning from 2019–20:

- Almost Family
- Celebrity Watch Party
- Deputy
- Empire
- Flirty Dancing
- Fox Presents
- Gordon Ramsay's 24 Hours to Hell and Back
- Labor of Love
- The Masked Singer: After the Mask
- Outmatched
- Ultimate Tag

=== NBC ===
Returning series:

- American Ninja Warrior^{†}
- America's Got Talent
- The Blacklist
- Brooklyn Nine-Nine
- Capital One College Bowl (Note: Series revival; first aired on CBS and NBC from 1959–70.)
- Chicago Fire
- Chicago Med
- Chicago P.D.
- Dateline NBC
- Ellen's Game of Games
- Football Night in America
- Good Girls
- Law & Order: Special Victims Unit
- Making It
- Manifest
- NBC Sunday Night Football
- New Amsterdam
- NHL on NBC
- Superstore
- This Is Us
- The Voice
- The Wall
- Weakest Link (Note: Second primetime weekly version; previously aired on NBC from 2001–02.)
- Zoey's Extraordinary Playlist

New series:

- **Connecting**
- **Debris**
- **Family Game Fight!**
- **Kenan**
- **Law & Order: Organized Crime**
- **Mr. Mayor**
- **Nurses**
- **Small Fortune**
- **Transplant**
- **Young Rock**

Not returning from 2019–20:

- America's Got Talent: The Champions
- Blindspot
- Bluff City Law
- Council of Dads
- Ellen's Greatest Night of Giveaways
- The Good Place
- Hollywood Game Night
- Indebted
- Lincoln Rhyme: Hunt for the Bone Collector
- Little Big Shots
- NBC Movie Night
- Perfect Harmony
- Songland
- Sunnyside (burned off on NBC.com)
- The Titan Games
- Will & Grace
- World of Dance

== Renewals and cancellations ==
=== Full season pickups ===
==== ABC ====
- Big Sky—Picked up for six additional episodes on December 7, 2020, bringing the episode count to 16.
- Black-ish—Picked up for six additional episodes on October 23, 2020, bringing the episode count to 21.

==== CBS ====
- B Positive—Picked up for five additional episodes on December 21, 2020, bringing the episode count to 18.

==== The CW ====
- The Outpost—Picked up for 13 additional episodes on October 7, 2020, bringing the episode count to 26.
- Superman & Lois—Picked up for two additional episodes on February 3, 2021, bringing the episode count to 15.
- Walker—Picked up for five additional episodes on February 3, 2021, bringing the episode count to 18.

==== Fox ====
- Let's Be Real—Picked up for four additional episodes on April 1, 2021, bringing the episode count to 5.

=== Renewals ===
==== ABC ====
- 20/20—Renewed for a forty-fourth season on May 18, 2021.
- The $100,000 Pyramid—Renewed for a sixth season on April 1, 2022.
- American Idol—Renewed for a twentieth season on May 13, 2021.
- America's Funniest Home Videos—Renewed for a thirty-second season on May 13, 2021.
- The Bachelor—Renewed for a twenty-sixth season on September 28, 2021.
- Bachelor in Paradise—Renewed for an eighth season on April 7, 2022.
- The Bachelorette—Renewed for an eighteenth season on March 15, 2021.
- Big Sky—Renewed for a second season on May 4, 2021.
- Black-ish—Renewed for an eighth and final season on May 14, 2021.
- Celebrity Family Feud—Renewed for a ninth season on April 1, 2022.
- Celebrity Wheel of Fortune—Renewed for a second season on May 13, 2021.
- The Con—Renewed for a second season on July 25, 2022.
- The Conners—Renewed for a fourth season on May 14, 2021.
- Dancing with the Stars—Renewed for a thirtieth season on March 30, 2021.
- The Goldbergs—Renewed for a ninth season on May 14, 2021.
- The Good Doctor—Renewed for a fifth season on May 3, 2021.
- The Great Christmas Light Fight—Renewed for a ninth season on December 10, 2020.
- Grey's Anatomy—Renewed for an eighteenth season on May 10, 2021.
- Holey Moley—Renewed for a fourth season on February 22, 2021.
- Home Economics—Renewed for a second season on May 14, 2021.
- A Million Little Things—Renewed for a fourth season on May 14, 2021.
- Monday Night Football–Renewed for a second season on March 18, 2021; deal will last into a thirteenth season in 2033.
- NHL on ABC—It was announced on March 10, 2021, that ABC's sister network ESPN regained the rights to air National Hockey League games (including 25 games slated to air on ESPN and ABC) for seven years through the 2027–28 season.
- Press Your Luck—Renewed for a fourth season on April 1, 2022.
- The Rookie—Renewed for a fourth season on May 14, 2021.
- Shark Tank—Renewed for a thirteenth season on May 13, 2021.
- Station 19—Renewed for a fifth season on May 10, 2021.
- Supermarket Sweep—Renewed for a ninth season on May 13, 2021.
- Who Wants to Be a Millionaire—Renewed for a twenty-third season on May 3, 2024.

==== CBS ====
- 48 Hours—Renewed for a thirty-fourth season on May 19, 2021.
- 60 Minutes—Renewed for a fifty-fourth season on May 19, 2021.
- The Amazing Race—Renewed for a thirty-third season on February 25, 2020.
- B Positive—Renewed for a second season on May 15, 2021.
- Big Brother—Renewed for a twenty-fourth season on May 31, 2022.
- Blue Bloods—Renewed for a twelfth season on April 15, 2021.
- Bob Hearts Abishola—Renewed for a third season on February 17, 2021.
- Bull—Renewed for a sixth and final season on April 15, 2021.
- The Equalizer—Renewed for a second season on March 9, 2021.
- FBI—Renewed for a fourth season on March 24, 2021.
- FBI: Most Wanted—Renewed for a third season on March 24, 2021.
- Love Island—Renewed for a fourth and fifth season on February 23, 2022, and will be moved to Peacock.
- Magnum P.I.—Renewed for a fourth season on April 15, 2021.
- NCIS—Renewed for a nineteenth season on April 15, 2021.
- NCIS: Los Angeles—Renewed for a thirteenth season on April 23, 2021.
- The Neighborhood—Renewed for a fourth season on February 17, 2021.
- SEAL Team—Renewed for a fifth season on May 18, 2021, which will air its first four episodes on CBS, before moving to Paramount+ for the remainder of its run.
- Secret Celebrity Renovation—Renewed for a second season on March 9, 2022.
- Superstar Racing Experience—Renewed for a second season on January 31, 2022.
- S.W.A.T.—Renewed for a fifth season on April 15, 2021.
- Undercover Boss—Renewed for an eleventh season on May 19, 2021.
- United States of Al—Renewed for a second season on May 15, 2021.
- Tough as Nails—Renewed for a third and fourth season on April 14, 2021.
- Young Sheldon—Renewed for a fifth, sixth and seventh season on March 30, 2021.

==== The CW ====
- All American—Renewed for a fourth season on February 3, 2021.
- Batwoman—Renewed for a third season on February 3, 2021.
- Charmed—Renewed for a fourth season on February 3, 2021.
- Coroner—Renewed for a fourth season on April 7, 2022.
- Devils—Renewed for a second season on April 7, 2022.
- Dynasty—Renewed for a fifth season on February 3, 2021.
- The Flash—Renewed for an eighth season on February 3, 2021.
- In the Dark—Renewed for a fourth season on February 3, 2021.
- Kung Fu—Renewed for a second season on May 3, 2021.
- Legacies—Renewed for a fourth season on February 3, 2021.
- Legends of Tomorrow—Renewed for a seventh season on February 3, 2021.
- Nancy Drew—Renewed for a third season on February 3, 2021.
- Penn & Teller: Fool Us—Renewed for a ninth season on December 7, 2020.
- Riverdale—Renewed for a sixth season on February 3, 2021.
- Roswell, New Mexico—Renewed for a fourth season on February 3, 2021.
- Stargirl—Renewed for a third and final season on May 3, 2021.
- Superman & Lois—Renewed for a second season on March 2, 2021.
- Two Sentence Horror Stories—Renewed for a third season on September 17, 2020.
- Walker—Renewed for a second season on February 3, 2021.
- Wellington Paranormal—Renewed for a third season on April 7, 2022.
- World's Funniest Animals—Renewed for a second season on December 7, 2020.

==== Fox ====
- 9-1-1—Renewed for a fifth season on May 17, 2021.
- 9-1-1: Lone Star—Renewed for a third season on May 17, 2021.
- Beat Shazam—Renewed for a fifth season on April 5, 2022.
- Bob's Burgers—Renewed for a twelfth and thirteenth season on September 23, 2020.
- Call Me Kat—Renewed for a second season on May 10, 2021.
- Crime Scene Kitchen—Renewed for a second season on May 16, 2022.
- Duncanville—Renewed for a third season on April 6, 2021.
- Family Guy—Renewed for a twentieth and twenty-first season on September 23, 2020.
- Fantasy Island—Renewed for a second season on November 4, 2021.
- The Great North—Renewed for a second season on June 22, 2020.
- Hell's Kitchen—Renewed for a twenty-first and twenty-second season on February 1, 2022.
- HouseBroken—Renewed for a second season on August 9, 2021.
- I Can See Your Voice—Renewed for a second season on January 27, 2021.
- Lego Masters—Renewed for a third season on December 3, 2021.
- The Masked Singer—Renewed for a sixth season on May 17, 2021.
- MasterChef—Renewed for a twelfth season on August 18, 2021.
- Name That Tune—Renewed for a second season on October 25, 2021.
- The Resident—Renewed for a fifth season on May 17, 2021.
- The Simpsons—Renewed for a thirty-third and thirty-fourth season on March 3, 2021.
- Thursday Night Football—Renewed for an eighth season on January 31, 2018.

==== NBC ====
- American Ninja Warrior—Renewed for a thirteenth season on March 31, 2022.
- America's Got Talent—Renewed for a seventeenth season on March 31, 2022.
- The Blacklist—Renewed for a ninth season on January 26, 2021.
- Capital One College Bowl—Renewed for a second season on April 28, 2022.
- Chicago Fire—Renewed for a tenth and eleventh season on February 27, 2020.
- Chicago Med—Renewed for a seventh and eighth season on February 27, 2020.
- Chicago P.D.—Renewed for a ninth and tenth season on February 27, 2020.
- Dateline NBC—Renewed for a thirtieth season on May 14, 2021.
- Football Night in America—Renewed for a sixteenth season on December 14, 2011; deal will go to a seventeenth season in 2022.
- Kenan—Renewed for a second season on April 30, 2021.
- Law & Order: Organized Crime—Renewed for a second season on May 14, 2021.
- Law & Order: Special Victims Unit—Renewed for a twenty-third and twenty-fourth season on February 27, 2020.
- Mr. Mayor—Renewed for a second season on March 22, 2021.
- NBC Sunday Night Football—Renewed for a sixteenth season on December 14, 2011; deal will go to a seventeenth season in 2022.
- New Amsterdam—Renewed for a fourth and fifth season on January 11, 2020.
- This Is Us—Renewed for a sixth and final season on May 12, 2019.
- Transplant—Renewed for a second season on December 11, 2020.
- The Voice—Renewed for a twenty-first season on March 30, 2021.
- Weakest Link—Renewed for a sixth season on January 25, 2021.
- Young Rock—Renewed for a second season on April 30, 2021.

=== Cancellations/series endings ===
==== ABC ====
- American Housewife—Canceled on May 14, 2021, after five seasons.
- Call Your Mother—Canceled on May 14, 2021. The series concluded on May 19, 2021.
- Card Sharks—Canceled on April 1, 2022, after two seasons.
- The Celebrity Dating Game—Canceled on April 1, 2022.
- For Life—Canceled on May 14, 2021, after two seasons.
- The Hustler—Canceled on April 1, 2022, after two seasons.
- Match Game—Canceled on April 1, 2022, after five seasons. On April 30, 2025, it was announced that the show would later return to ABC in the 2024–25 schedule.
- Mike Tyson: The Knockout—The documentary miniseries was meant to run for one season only; it concluded on June 1, 2021.
- Mixed-ish—Canceled on May 14, 2021, after two seasons. The series concluded on May 18, 2021.
- Pooch Perfect—Canceled on January 20, 2022.
- Rebel—Canceled on May 14, 2021. The series concluded on June 10, 2021.
- Soul of a Nation—The documentary miniseries was meant to run for one season only; it concluded on April 6, 2021.
- The Ultimate Surfer—Canceled on March 30, 2022.

==== CBS ====
- All Rise—Canceled on May 15, 2021, after two seasons. On September 29, 2021, it was announced that Oprah Winfrey Network would pick up the series for another season.
- Clarice—It was announced on June 10, 2021, that a possible move to Paramount+ became unlikely to happen, rendering it as a de facto cancellation. The series concluded on June 24, 2021.
- MacGyver—It was announced on April 7, 2021, that season five would be the final season. The series concluded on April 30, 2021.
- Manhunt: Deadly Games—The anthology series was meant to run for one season only; it concluded on November 7, 2020.
- Mom—It was announced on February 17, 2021, that season eight would be the final season. The series concluded on May 13, 2021.
- NCIS: New Orleans—It was announced on February 17, 2021, that season seven would be the final season. The series concluded on May 23, 2021.
- One Day at a Time—Canceled on November 24, 2020, by creator Pop, after four seasons.
- Star Trek: Discovery—The broadcast television run was meant for one season only; it concluded on February 4, 2021.
- The Unicorn—Canceled on May 15, 2021, after two seasons.

==== The CW ====
- Black Lightning—It was announced on November 20, 2020, that season four would be the final season. The series concluded on May 24, 2021.
- Bulletproof—Originally renewed for a fourth season on January 15, 2021. The decision was later reversed and the series canceled on May 21, 2021, after three seasons by creator Sky One, following sexual misconduct allegations against Noel Clarke.
- Burden of Truth—It was announced on March 18, 2021, that season four would be the final season. The series concluded on September 17, 2021.
- Gilmore Girls: A Year in the Life—The miniseries was meant to run for one season only by creator Netflix, the miniseries was aired as a four-night event beginning from November 23 through November 26, 2020.
- The Outpost—Canceled on September 15, 2021, after four seasons. The series concluded on October 7, 2021.
- Pandora—Canceled on May 17, 2021, after two seasons.
- The Republic of Sarah—Canceled on September 2, 2021. The series concluded on September 6, 2021.
- Supergirl—It was announced on September 22, 2020, that season six would be the final season. The series concluded on November 9, 2021.
- Supernatural—It was announced on March 22, 2019, that season fifteen would be the final season. The series concluded on November 19, 2020.
- Swamp Thing—Canceled on June 6, 2019, by creator DC Universe. The series concluded on December 22, 2020.
- Tell Me a Story—Canceled on May 11, 2020, by creator CBS All Access, after two seasons. The series concluded on December 29, 2020.
- Trickster—Canceled on January 29, 2021, by creator CBC. The series concluded on February 16, 2021.

==== Fox ====
- Bless the Harts—Canceled on April 1, 2021, after two seasons. The series concluded on June 20, 2021.
- Cosmos: Possible Worlds—The documentary miniseries was meant to run for one season only; it concluded on December 21, 2020.
- Filthy Rich—Canceled on October 30, 2020, marking the first cancellation of the season. The series concluded on November 30, 2020.
- Holmes Family Effect—The documentary miniseries was meant to run for one season only; it concluded on March 23, 2021.
- L.A.'s Finest—Canceled on October 14, 2020, by creator Charter Spectrum, after two seasons.
- Last Man Standing—It was announced on October 14, 2020, that season nine would be the final season. The series concluded on May 20, 2021.
- The Moodys—Pulled from the schedule after five episodes in the second season on April 16, 2021; Fox announced that the series would move from Thursdays to a burn off run of three episodes on Sundays. The series was later canceled on June 17, 2021, after two seasons. The series concluded on June 20, 2021.
- Next—Canceled on October 30, 2020, marking the first cancellation of the season. The series concluded on December 22, 2020.
- Prodigal Son—Canceled on May 10, 2021, after two seasons. The series concluded on May 18, 2021.

==== NBC ====
- Brooklyn Nine-Nine—It was announced on February 11, 2021, that season eight would be the final season. The series concluded on September 16, 2021.
- Connecting—Pulled from the schedule and canceled on November 2, 2020. The remaining unaired episodes were made available on NBC's website and Peacock. The series concluded on November 16, 2020.
- Debris—Canceled on May 27, 2021.
- Ellen's Game of Games—Canceled on January 18, 2022, after four seasons.
- Good Girls—Canceled on June 25, 2021, after four seasons. The series concluded on July 22, 2021.
- Manifest—Canceled on June 14, 2021, after three seasons. On August 28, 2021, it was announced that Netflix would pick up the series for a fourth and final season.
- NHL on NBC—It was announced on April 26, 2021, that NBC had backed out of negotiations for the partial contractual rights of the remainder of the National Hockey League games (including the New Year's Day Winter Classic) and awarded the rights to Turner Sports beginning with the 2021–22 season and lasted through 2027–28 season.
- Small Fortune—Canceled on January 20, 2022.
- Superstore—It was announced on December 3, 2020, that season six would be the final season. The series concluded on March 25, 2021.
- Ultimate Slip 'N Slide—It was announced on August 6, 2021, that the series would not be airing.
- Zoey's Extraordinary Playlist—Canceled on June 9, 2021, after two seasons.

== See also ==
- 2020–21 Canadian network television schedule
- 2020–21 United States network television schedule (daytime)
- 2020–21 United States network television schedule (late night)
- 2020–21 United States network television schedule (overnight)
