= 2019–20 United States network television schedule =

Television schedule for the fall of 2019

The 2019–20 network television schedule for the five major English-language commercial broadcast networks that air in the United States covers the prime time hours from September 2019 to August 2020. The schedule is followed by a list per network of returning series, new series, and series canceled after the 2018–19 season.

NBC was the first to announce its fall schedule on May 12, 2019, followed by Fox on May 13, ABC on May 14, CBS on May 15, and The CW on May 16, 2019.

PBS is not included, as member television stations have local flexibility over most of their schedules and broadcast times for network shows may vary. Ion Television, The CW Plus, and MyNetworkTV are also not included since the networks' schedules comprise syndicated reruns (with limited original programming on the latter two). The CW does not air network programming on Saturday nights.

New series are highlighted in bold.

All times are U.S. Eastern and Pacific Time (except for some live sports or events). Subtract one hour for Central, Mountain, Alaska, and Hawaii–Aleutian times.

Each of the 30 highest-rated shows is listed with its rank and rating as determined by Nielsen Media Research.

The TV season was strongly affected by the COVID-19 pandemic. While the full impact of the health catastrophe did not hit until March 2020, by which time the network shows had already filmed the majority of their seasons' scripts, the entire primetime slate halted production that spring and did not resume it until the fall of 2020.

== Legend ==
- Light blue indicates local programming.
- Gray indicates encore programming.
- Blue-gray indicates news programming.
- Light green indicates sporting events.
- Light Purple indicates movies.
- Red indicates series being burned off and other regularly scheduled programs, including specials.
- Yellow indicates the top-10 most watched programs of the season.
- Cyan indicates the top-20 most watched programs of the season.
- Magenta indicates the top-30 most watched programs of the season.

== Sunday ==
Network		7:00 p.m.	7:30 p.m.	8:00 p.m.	8:30 p.m.	9:00 p.m.	9:30 p.m.	10:00 p.m.	10:30 p.m.
ABC	Fall	America's Funniest Home Videos		Kids Say the Darndest Things		Shark Tank		The Rookie	
ABC	Winter	America's Funniest Home Videos		Kids Say the Darndest Things		Shark Tank		Shark Tank (R)	
ABC	Mid-winter	America's Funniest Home Videos		American Idol				The Rookie	
ABC	Spring	America's Funniest Home Videos		Celebrity Family Feud		Press Your Luck		Match Game	
ABC	Summer	America's Funniest Home Videos		Celebrity Family Feud		Press Your Luck		Match Game	
CBS	Fall	NFL on CBS (4:25 p.m.)	60 Minutes (14/10.46)		God Friended Me		NCIS: Los Angeles (26/8.91) (Tied with Magnum P.I.)		Madam Secretary (continued until 11:30 p.m.)
CBS	Winter	60 Minutes (14/10.46)		God Friended Me		NCIS: Los Angeles (26/8.91) (Tied with Magnum P.I.)		NCIS: New Orleans (20/9.58)	
CBS	Spring	60 Minutes (14/10.46)		CBS Sunday Night Movies					
CBS	Summer	60 Minutes (14/10.46)		**Tough as Nails** (R)		NCIS: Los Angeles (R)		NCIS: New Orleans (R)	
CBS	Late summer	60 Minutes (14/10.46)		Big Brother		Love Island		NCIS: New Orleans (R)	
The CW	Fall	Local programming		**Batwoman**		Supergirl		Local programming	
The CW	Winter	Local programming		**Batwoman**		Supergirl		Local programming	
The CW	Spring	Local programming		**Stargirl** (R)		Supergirl		Local programming	
The CW	Summer	Local programming		**Stargirl** (R)		Penn & Teller: Fool Us (R)		Local programming	
The CW	Late summer	Local programming		**Fridge Wars**		Supernatural (R)		Local programming	
Fox	Fall	Fox NFL (4:25 p.m.)	The OT	The Simpsons	**Bless the Harts**	Bob's Burgers	Family Guy	Local programming	
Fox	Winter	The Simpsons (R)	Bob's Burgers (R)	The Simpsons	**Duncanville**	Bob's Burgers	Family Guy	Local programming	
Fox	Spring	The Simpsons (R)	Bob's Burgers (R)	The Simpsons	**Duncanville**	Bob's Burgers	Family Guy	Local programming	
Fox	Summer	Last Man Standing (R)	**Duncanville** (R)	The Simpsons	**Bless the Harts** (R)	Bob's Burgers	Family Guy	Local programming	
NBC	Fall	Football Night in America		NBC Sunday Night Football (8:20 p.m.) (continued to game completion) (1/20.09)					
NBC	Winter	The Wall		Little Big Shots		**Zoey's Extraordinary Playlist**		Good Girls	
NBC	Spring	Little Big Shots		The Wall		**Zoey's Extraordinary Playlist**		Good Girls	
NBC	Summer	Hollywood Game Night		The Titan Games (R)		America's Got Talent (R)			
NBC	Mid-summer	**Cannonball**		The Titan Games (R)		America's Got Talent (R)			
NBC	Late summer	**Cannonball**		NHL on NBC					

== Monday ==
Network		8:00 p.m.	8:30 p.m.	9:00 p.m.	9:30 p.m.	10:00 p.m.	10:30 p.m.
ABC	Fall	Dancing with the Stars				The Good Doctor (11/10.82)	
ABC	Late fall	The Great Christmas Light Fight				The Good Doctor (11/10.82)	
ABC	Winter	The Bachelor				The Good Doctor (11/10.82)	
ABC	Spring	American Idol (28/8.54)				The Good Doctor (11/10.82)	
ABC	Mid-spring	**The Bachelor Presents: Listen to Your Heart**				**The Baker and the Beauty**	
ABC	Summer	**The Bachelor: The Greatest Seasons - Ever!**					
CBS	Fall	The Neighborhood	**Bob Hearts Abishola**	**All Rise**		Bull (13/10.61)	
CBS	Winter	The Neighborhood	**Bob Hearts Abishola**	**All Rise**		Bull (13/10.61)	
CBS	Spring	The Neighborhood	**Bob Hearts Abishola**	**All Rise**		Bull (13/10.61)	
CBS	Summer	The Neighborhood	**Bob Hearts Abishola**	Love Island		Bull (13/10.61)	
The CW	Fall	All American		Black Lightning		Local programming	
The CW	Winter	All American		Black Lightning		Local programming	
The CW	Spring	Whose Line Is It Anyway?	Whose Line Is It Anyway? (R)	Roswell, New Mexico		Local programming	
The CW	Summer	Whose Line Is It Anyway?	Whose Line Is It Anyway? (R)	Penn & Teller: Fool Us		Local programming	
Fox	Fall	9-1-1 (15/10.42)		**Prodigal Son**		Local programming	
Fox	Winter	**9-1-1: Lone Star** (24/9.09)		**Prodigal Son**		Local programming	
Fox	Spring	9-1-1 (15/10.42)		**Prodigal Son**		Local programming	
Fox	Late spring	9-1-1 (15/10.42)		**9-1-1: Lone Star** (R)		Local programming	
Fox	Summer	Fox Presents				Local programming	
NBC	Fall	The Voice (16/10.23)				**Bluff City Law**	
NBC	Winter	America's Got Talent: The Champions (25/8.92)				Manifest	
NBC	Late winter	The Voice (16/10.23)				Manifest	
NBC	Spring	The Voice (16/10.23)				Songland	
NBC	Late spring	The Titan Games		The Wall		Songland	
NBC	Summer	The Titan Games		The Wall		Dateline NBC	

== Tuesday ==
Network		8:00 p.m.	8:30 p.m.	9:00 p.m.	9:30 p.m.	10:00 p.m.	10:30 p.m.
ABC	Fall	The Conners	Bless This Mess	**Mixed-ish**	Black-ish	**Emergence**	
ABC	Winter	The Conners	Bless This Mess	**Mixed-ish**	Black-ish	**For Life**	
ABC	Spring	The Conners	The Conners (R)	Various programming		**The Genetic Detective**	
ABC	Summer	Modern Family (R)		Black-ish (R)	**Mixed-ish** (R)	What Would You Do?	
CBS	Fall	NCIS (2/15.34)		FBI (4/12.55)		NCIS: New Orleans (20/9.58)	
CBS	Winter	NCIS (2/15.34)		FBI (4/12.55)		**FBI: Most Wanted** (17/10.20)	
CBS	Spring	NCIS (2/15.34)		FBI (4/12.55)		**FBI: Most Wanted** (17/10.20)	
CBS	Summer	NCIS (2/15.34)		Love Island		**FBI: Most Wanted** (17/10.20)	
The CW	Fall	The Flash		Arrow		Local programming	
The CW	Winter	The Flash		Legends of Tomorrow		Local programming	
The CW	Spring	**Stargirl**		Legends of Tomorrow		Local programming	
The CW	Summer	**Stargirl**		**The CW Happy Hour**		Local programming	
The CW	Mid-summer	**Stargirl**		**Tell Me a Story**		Local programming	
The CW	Late summer	**Dead Pixels**	**Dead Pixels** (R)	**Tell Me a Story**		Local programming	
Fox	Fall	The Resident		Empire		Local programming	
Fox	Winter	The Resident		Gordon Ramsay's 24 Hours to Hell and Back		Local programming	
Fox	Spring	The Resident		Empire		Local programming	
Fox	Mid-spring	The Masked Singer (R)		Empire		Local programming	
Fox	Late spring	Hell's Kitchen (R)		Gordon Ramsay's 24 Hours to Hell and Back (R)		Local programming	
Fox	Summer	Hell's Kitchen (R)		**Prodigal Son** (R)		Local programming	
NBC	Fall	The Voice (21/9.53)		This Is Us (7/11.55)		New Amsterdam (18/9.70)	
NBC	Winter	Ellen's Game of Games		This Is Us (7/11.55)		New Amsterdam (18/9.70)	
NBC	Early spring	Ellen's Game of Games		New Amsterdam (18/9.70)		NBC News Special Report: Coronavirus Pandemic	
NBC	Spring	Ellen's Game of Games		Ellen's Game of Games		New Amsterdam (R)	
NBC	Mid-spring	The Voice (21/9.53)		Ellen's Game of Games		New Amsterdam (R)	
NBC	Late spring	America's Got Talent				World of Dance	
NBC	Summer	America's Got Talent				World of Dance	

== Wednesday ==
Network		8:00 p.m.	8:30 p.m.	9:00 p.m.	9:30 p.m.	10:00 p.m.	10:30 p.m.
ABC	Fall	The Goldbergs	Schooled	Modern Family	Single Parents	**Stumptown**	
ABC	Winter	The Goldbergs	Schooled	Modern Family	Single Parents	**Stumptown**	
ABC	Spring	The Goldbergs	Schooled	Modern Family	American Housewife	**Stumptown**	
ABC	Mid-spring	The Goldbergs	Schooled	American Housewife	Single Parents	Who Wants to Be a Millionaire	
ABC	Late spring	The Wonderful World of Disney				Agents of S.H.I.E.L.D.	
ABC	Summer	**United We Fall**	The Goldbergs (R)	The Conners (R)	American Housewife (R)	Agents of S.H.I.E.L.D.	
CBS	Fall	Survivor: Island of the Idols (23/9.30)		SEAL Team		S.W.A.T.	
CBS	Winter	Undercover Boss		Criminal Minds		S.W.A.T.	
CBS	Late winter	Survivor: Winners at War (23/9.30)		SEAL Team		S.W.A.T.	
CBS	Spring	**Game On!**		SEAL Team		S.W.A.T.	
CBS	Summer	**Tough as Nails**		**Game On!**		SEAL Team (R)	
CBS	Late summer	Big Brother		**Tough as Nails**		SEAL Team (R)	
The CW	Fall	Riverdale		**Nancy Drew**		Local programming	
The CW	Winter	Riverdale		**Nancy Drew**		Local programming	
The CW	Spring	Riverdale		Bulletproof		Local programming	
The CW	Late spring	The 100		Bulletproof		Local programming	
The CW	Summer	The 100		**Coroner**		Local programming	
Fox	Fall	The Masked Singer (12/10.73)		**Almost Family**		Local programming	
Fox	Winter	**Flirty Dancing**		**Almost Family**		Local programming	
Fox	Mid-winter	The Masked Singer (12/10.73)		**Lego Masters**		Local programming	
Fox	Spring	The Masked Singer (12/10.73)		**The Masked Singer: After the Mask**		Local programming	
Fox	Late spring	MasterChef (R)		**Ultimate Tag**		Local programming	
Fox	Summer	MasterChef (R)				Local programming	
NBC	Fall	Chicago Med (10/11.22)		Chicago Fire (6/11.70)		Chicago P.D. (9/11.23)	
NBC	Winter	Chicago Med (10/11.22)		Chicago Fire (6/11.70)		Chicago P.D. (9/11.23)	
NBC	Spring	Chicago Med (10/11.22)		Chicago Fire (6/11.70)		Chicago P.D. (9/11.23)	
NBC	Summer	America's Got Talent		Ellen's Game of Games (R)		Chicago P.D. (9/11.23)	

== Thursday ==
Network		8:00 p.m.	8:30 p.m.	9:00 p.m.	9:30 p.m.	10:00 p.m.	10:30 p.m.
ABC	Fall	Grey's Anatomy (22/9.39)		A Million Little Things		How to Get Away with Murder	
ABC	Late fall	Holiday specials		The Great American Baking Show			
ABC	Winter	Station 19 (29/8.52) (Tied with Mom)		Grey's Anatomy (22/9.39)		A Million Little Things	
ABC	Spring	Station 19 (29/8.52) (Tied with Mom)		Grey's Anatomy (22/9.39)		How to Get Away with Murder	
ABC	Mid-spring	Who Wants to Be a Millionaire		Station 19 (29/8.52) (Tied with Mom)		How to Get Away with Murder	
ABC	Late spring	Who Wants to Be a Millionaire		Holey Moley		To Tell the Truth	
ABC	Summer	Holey Moley		**Don't**		To Tell the Truth	
CBS	Fall	Young Sheldon (8/11.45)	**The Unicorn**	Mom (29/8.52) (Tied with Station 19)	**Carol's Second Act**	**Evil**	
CBS	Winter	Young Sheldon (8/11.45)	**The Unicorn**	Mom (29/8.52) (Tied with Station 19)	**Carol's Second Act**	**Tommy**	
CBS	Spring	Young Sheldon (8/11.45)	Man with a Plan	Mom (29/8.52) (Tied with Station 19)	**Broke**	**Tommy**	
CBS	Mid-spring	Young Sheldon (8/11.45)	Man with a Plan	Mom (29/8.52) (Tied with Station 19)	**Broke**	S.W.A.T. (R)	
CBS	Summer	Young Sheldon (8/11.45)	**The Unicorn** (R)	Mom (29/8.52) (Tied with Station 19)	**Broke**	S.W.A.T. (R)	
CBS	Mid-summer	Young Sheldon (8/11.45)	**The Unicorn** (R)	Mom (29/8.52) (Tied with Station 19)	Mom (R)	NCIS: Los Angeles (R)	
CBS	Late summer	Big Brother		Love Island		Various programming	
The CW	Fall	Supernatural		Legacies		Local programming	
The CW	Winter	**Katy Keene**		Legacies		Local programming	
The CW	Spring	**Katy Keene**		In The Dark		Local programming	
The CW	Late spring	Burden of Truth		In The Dark		Local programming	
The CW	Summer	**Killer Camp**		Penn & Teller: Fool Us (R)		Local programming	
The CW	Late summer	Mysteries Decoded		Penn & Teller: Fool Us (R)		Local programming	
Fox	Early fall	Thursday Night Baseball (7:00 p.m.)				Local programming	
Fox	Fall	Fox NFL Thursday	Thursday Night Football (3/15.05)				
Fox	Winter	Last Man Standing	**Outmatched**	**Deputy**		Local programming	
Fox	Spring	Last Man Standing	Last Man Standing (R)	Mental Samurai (R)		Local programming	
Fox	Late spring	**Celebrity Watch Party**		**Labor of Love**		Local programming	
Fox	Summer	Thursday Night Baseball (7:00 p.m.)				Local programming	
NBC	Fall	Superstore	**Perfect Harmony**	The Good Place	**Sunnyside**	Law & Order: Special Victims Unit	
NBC	Mid-fall	Superstore	**Perfect Harmony**	The Good Place	Will & Grace	Law & Order: Special Victims Unit	
NBC	Winter	Superstore	The Good Place	Will & Grace	**Perfect Harmony**	Law & Order: Special Victims Unit	
NBC	Mid-winter	Superstore	Brooklyn Nine-Nine	Will & Grace	**Indebted**	Law & Order: Special Victims Unit	
NBC	Late Spring	**Council of Dads**		Blindspot		Law & Order: Special Victims Unit	
NBC	Summer	The Wall (R)		Law & Order: Special Victims Unit (R)		Law & Order: Special Victims Unit	

== Friday ==
Network		8:00 p.m.	8:30 p.m.	9:00 p.m.	9:30 p.m.	10:00 p.m.	10:30 p.m.
ABC	Fall	American Housewife	Fresh Off the Boat	20/20			
ABC	Winter	American Housewife	Fresh Off the Boat	20/20			
ABC	Spring	Shark Tank		20/20			
ABC	Summer	Shark Tank		20/20			
CBS	Fall	Hawaii Five-0 (19/9.68)		Magnum P.I. (26/8.91) (Tied with NCIS: Los Angeles)		Blue Bloods (5/11.96)	
CBS	Winter	MacGyver		Hawaii Five-0 (19/9.68)		Blue Bloods (5/11.96)	
CBS	Spring	MacGyver		Magnum P.I. (26/8.91) (Tied with NCIS: Los Angeles)		Blue Bloods (5/11.96)	
CBS	Summer	**The Greatest #AtHome Videos**		Magnum P.I. (26/8.91) (Tied with NCIS: Los Angeles)		Blue Bloods (5/11.96)	
CBS	Late summer	MacGyver (R)		Love Island		Blue Bloods (5/11.96)	
The CW	Fall	Charmed		Dynasty		Local programming	
The CW	Winter	Charmed		Dynasty		Local programming	
The CW	Spring	Masters of Illusion	Masters of Illusion (R)	Whose Line Is It Anyway? (R)		Local programming	
The CW	Summer	Masters of Illusion	Masters of Illusion (R)	**Being Reuben**		Local programming	
Fox		WWE Friday Night SmackDown				Local programming	
NBC	Fall	The Blacklist		Dateline NBC			
NBC	Winter	**Lincoln Rhyme: Hunt for the Bone Collector**		Dateline NBC			
NBC	Spring	The Blacklist		Dateline NBC			
NBC	Late spring	World of Dance (R)		The Wall (R)		Dateline NBC	
NBC	Summer	The Wall (R)		Dateline NBC			
NBC	Late summer	America's Got Talent (R)				Dateline NBC	

== Saturday ==
Network		8:00 p.m.	8:30 p.m.	9:00 p.m.	9:30 p.m.	10:00 p.m.	10:30 p.m.
ABC	Fall	Saturday Night Football					
ABC	Winter	The Jump	NBA Saturday Primetime				
ABC	Spring	Shark Tank (R)		American Idol (R)			
ABC	Late spring	**The Last Dance**				The Rookie (R)	
ABC	Summer	America's Funniest Home Videos (R)		Shark Tank (R)		The Good Doctor (R)	
CBS	Fall	Crimetime Saturday				48 Hours	
CBS	Winter	Crimetime Saturday				48 Hours	
CBS	Spring	Crimetime Saturday				48 Hours	
CBS	Summer	Love Island				48 Hours	
Fox	Fall	Fox College Football					
Fox	Winter	Fox College Football					
Fox	Spring	9-1-1 (R)		Gordon Ramsay's 24 Hours to Hell and Back (R)		Local programming	
Fox	Late spring	**Flirty Dancing** (R)		**Lego Masters** (R)		Local programming	
Fox	Summer	Gordon Ramsay's 24 Hours to Hell and Back (R)		**Lego Masters** (R)		Local programming	
Fox	Mid-summer	Various programming		**Ultimate Tag** (R)		Local programming	
Fox	Late summer	Baseball Night in America (7:00 p.m.)				Local programming	
NBC	Fall	Dateline Saturday Mystery				SNL Vintage	
NBC	Winter	Dateline Saturday Mystery				SNL Vintage	
NBC	Spring	NBC Movie Night				SNL Vintage	
NBC	Summer	Dateline Saturday Mystery				SNL Vintage	
NBC	Late summer	NHL on NBC					

- Note: As with the two previous seasons, NBC aired all new live episodes of Saturday Night Live in real time with the rest of the United States, placing it in that time period for the Pacific and Mountain time viewers beginning September 28, with a rebroadcast following the late local news in those time zones. The network's affiliates in Alaska, Hawaii, and other Pacific Islands will continued to air the show on a delay. Due to the COVID-19 pandemic, three "At Home" editions of the series have aired, but have been pre-compiled and edited before broadcast, airing after the late local news in all time zones.
- Note: Due to the suspension of the 2019–20 NBA season, NBA Saturday Primetime games were replaced by encores of ABC programming, as well as docuseries The Last Dance. The 76ers-Warriors game on March 7 wound up being the "season finale" for NBA Saturday Primetime, as the Warriors were not invited to Orlando when the NBA resumed play in July.
- Note: Fox aired primetime PBC Fight Cards throughout its Late summer programming schedule.

== By network ==
=== ABC ===
Returning series:

- 20/20
- Agents of S.H.I.E.L.D.
- America's Funniest Home Videos
- American Housewife
- American Idol
- The Bachelor
- Black-ish
- Bless This Mess
- Celebrity Family Feud
- The Conners
- Dancing with the Stars
- Fresh Off the Boat
- The Goldbergs
- The Good Doctor
- The Great American Baking Show
- The Great Christmas Light Fight
- Grey's Anatomy
- Holey Moley
- How to Get Away with Murder
- Kids Say the Darndest Things (Note: Series revival, previously aired by CBS from 1998–2000.)
- Match Game
- A Million Little Things
- Modern Family
- NBA Saturday Primetime
- Press Your Luck
- The Rookie
- Saturday Night Football
- Schooled
- Shark Tank
- Single Parents
- Station 19
- To Tell the Truth
- The Wonderful World of Disney
- What Would You Do?
- Who Wants to Be a Millionaire (Note: Return of primetime celebrity format.)

New series:

- **The Bachelor Presents: Listen to Your Heart**
- **The Bachelor: The Greatest Seasons - Ever!**
- **The Baker and the Beauty**
- **Don't**
- **Emergence**
- **For Life**
- **The Genetic Detective**
- **The Last Dance** (Note: U.S. broadcast television run of ESPN 10-part documentary series.)
- **Mixed-ish**
- **Stumptown**
- **United We Fall**

Not returning from 2018–19:

- 1969
- The $100,000 Pyramid (returned for 2020–21)
- The Alec Baldwin Show
- Bachelor in Paradise (returned for 2020–21)
- The Bachelorette (returned for 2020–21)
- Card Sharks (returned for 2020–21)
- Child Support
- Dancing with the Stars: Juniors
- Family Food Fight
- The Fix
- For the People
- Grand Hotel
- The Kids Are Alright
- Reef Break
- Speechless
- Splitting Up Together
- Videos After Dark
- Whiskey Cavalier

=== CBS ===
Returning series:

- 48 Hours
- 60 Minutes
- Big Brother
- Blue Bloods
- Bull
- CBS Sunday Night Movies (Note: Series revival, previously aired by CBS from 1979–2006.)
- Criminal Minds
- FBI
- God Friended Me
- Hawaii Five-0
- Love Island
- MacGyver
- Madam Secretary
- Magnum P.I.
- Man with a Plan
- Mom
- NCIS
- NCIS: Los Angeles
- NCIS: New Orleans
- The Neighborhood
- NFL on CBS
- SEAL Team
- Survivor
- S.W.A.T.
- Undercover Boss (Note: New episodes held from their originally intended airdate in the 2017–18 season.)
- Young Sheldon

New series:

- **All Rise**
- **Bob Hearts Abishola**
- **Broke**
- **Carol's Second Act**
- **Evil**
- **FBI: Most Wanted**
- **Game On!**
- **The Greatest #AtHome Videos**
- **Tommy**
- **Tough as Nails**
- **The Unicorn**

Not returning from 2018–19:

- The Amazing Race (returned for 2020–21)
- The Big Bang Theory
- Blood & Treasure (moved to Paramount+)
- Celebrity Big Brother (returned for 2021–22)
- The Code
- Elementary
- Fam
- The Good Fight
- Happy Together
- Instinct
- Life in Pieces
- Million Dollar Mile
- Murphy Brown
- Ransom
- The Red Line
- Whistleblower
- The World's Best

=== The CW ===
Returning series:

- The 100
- All American
- Arrow
- Black Lightning
- Bulletproof
- Burden of Truth
- Charmed
- Dynasty
- The Flash
- In the Dark
- Legacies
- Legends of Tomorrow
- Masters of Illusion
- Mysteries Decoded (Note: Episodes that aired this season only included updates to the cases explored during the 2018–19 season.)
- Penn & Teller: Fool Us
- Riverdale
- Roswell, New Mexico
- Supergirl
- Supernatural
- Whose Line Is It Anyway?

New series:

- **Batwoman**
- **Being Reuben**
- **The Christmas Caroler Challenge**
- **Coroner**
- **The CW Happy Hour**
- **Dead Pixels**
- **Fridge Wars**
- **Katy Keene**
- **Killer Camp**
- **Nancy Drew**
- **Stargirl** (shared with DC Universe)
- **Taskmaster**
- **Tell Me a Story** (Note: U.S. broadcast television premiere; previously released on CBS All Access.)

Not returning from 2018–19:

- The Big Stage
- Crazy Ex-Girlfriend
- Hypnotize Me
- I Ship It (burned off on CW Seed)
- iZombie
- Jane the Virgin
- My Last Days
- The Outpost (returned for 2020–21)
- Pandora (returned for 2020–21)
- Red Bull Peaking
- Two Sentence Horror Stories (returned for 2020–21)

=== Fox ===
Returning series:

- 9-1-1
- Baseball Night in America
- Bob's Burgers
- Empire
- Family Guy
- Fox College Football
- Fox Major League Baseball
- Fox NFL Thursday
- Fox PBC Fight Night
- Fox Presents
- Gordon Ramsay's 24 Hours to Hell and Back
- Last Man Standing
- The Masked Singer
- NFL on Fox
- The OT
- The Resident
- The Simpsons
- Thursday Night Football
- WWE SmackDown (moved from USA Network)

New series:

- **9-1-1: Lone Star**
- **Almost Family**
- **Bless the Harts**
- **Celebrity Watch Party**
- **Deputy**
- **Duncanville**
- **Flirty Dancing**
- **Labor of Love**
- **Lego Masters**
- **The Masked Singer: After the Mask**
- **The Moodys**
- **Outmatched**
- **Prodigal Son**
- **Ultimate Tag**

Not returning from 2018–19:

- Beat Shazam (returned for 2020–21)
- BH90210
- The Cool Kids
- First Responders Live
- The Gifted
- Gotham
- Hell's Kitchen (returned for 2020–21)
- Lethal Weapon
- MasterChef (returned for 2020–21)
- MasterChef Junior (returned for 2021–22)
- Mental Samurai (returned for 2020–21)
- The Orville (moved to Hulu in 2022)
- Paradise Hotel
- The Passage
- Proven Innocent
- Rel
- So You Think You Can Dance (returned for 2021–22)
- Spin the Wheel
- Star
- What Just Happened??! with Fred Savage

=== NBC ===
Returning series:

- America's Got Talent
- America's Got Talent: The Champions
- The Blacklist
- Blindspot
- Brooklyn Nine-Nine
- Chicago Fire
- Chicago Med
- Chicago P.D.
- Dateline NBC
- Ellen's Game of Games
- Football Night in America
- Good Girls
- The Good Place
- Hollywood Game Night
- Law & Order: Special Victims Unit
- Little Big Shots
- Making It
- Manifest
- NBC Movie Night
- NBC Sunday Night Football
- New Amsterdam
- NHL on NBC
- Songland
- Superstore
- This Is Us
- The Titan Games
- The Voice
- The Wall
- Will & Grace
- World of Dance

New series:

- **Bluff City Law**
- **Council of Dads**
- **Ellen's Greatest Night of Giveaways**
- **Indebted**
- **Lincoln Rhyme: Hunt for the Bone Collector**
- **Perfect Harmony**
- **Sunnyside**
- **Zoey's Extraordinary Playlist**

Not returning from 2018–19:

- Abby's
- American Ninja Warrior (returned for 2020–21)
- A.P. Bio (moved to Peacock)
- Bring the Funny
- The Enemy Within
- I Feel Bad
- The InBetween
- Midnight, Texas
- The Village

== Renewals and cancellations ==
Note: Series that were unable to fulfil their original or extended episode orders due to the COVID-19 pandemic have been indicated below.

=== Full season pickups ===
==== ABC ====
- American Housewife—Picked up for six additional episodes on November 7, 2019, bringing the episode count to 21; one episode remained unfilmed.
- Bless This Mess—Picked up for six additional episodes on November 7, 2019, bringing the episode count to 19.
- The Conners—Picked up for six additional episodes on May 14, 2019, bringing the episode count to 19.
- A Million Little Things—Picked up for a 19-episode full season on August 8, 2019.
- Mixed-ish—Picked up for a 22-episode full season on October 28, 2019.
- The Rookie—Picked up for a 20-episode full season on October 28, 2019.
- Schooled—Picked up for a 22-episode full season on December 3, 2019; one episode remained unfilmed.
- Stumptown—Picked up for five additional episodes on October 28, 2019, bringing the episode count to 18.

==== CBS ====
- All Rise—Picked up for a 22-episode full season on October 22, 2019; two episodes were unfilmed, with one original episode compiled through web conferencing platforms.
- Bob Hearts Abishola—Picked up for a 22-episode full season on October 22, 2019; two episodes remained unfilmed.
- Carol's Second Act—Picked up for five additional episodes on October 22, 2019, bringing the episode count to 18.
- The Greatest #AtHome Videos—Picked up for four additional episodes on July 2, 2020, bringing this season's episode count to 5.
- MacGyver—Picked up for a 22-episode full season on November 6, 2019. (Note: In March 2020, following production shutdowns due to the COVID-19 pandemic, the decision was taken to conclude the fourth season with 13 episodes. The remaining half-dozen episodes that had completed filming were retained as back-up programming for Fall 2020 and were aired as a part of season 5.)
- The Unicorn—Picked up for five additional episodes on October 22, 2019, bringing the episode count to 18.

==== The CW ====
- The 100—Picked up for three additional episodes on June 6, 2019, bringing the episode count to 16.
- All American—Picked up for three additional episodes on October 8, 2019, bringing the episode count to 16.
- Batwoman—Picked up for a 22-episode full season on October 25, 2019; two episodes remained unfilmed.
- Legacies—Picked up for four additional episodes on July 18, 2019, bringing the episode count to 20; four episodes remained unfilmed.
- Nancy Drew—Picked up a 22-episode full season on October 25, 2019; four episodes remained unfilmed.

==== Fox ====
- Prodigal Son—Picked up for a 22-episode full season on October 7, 2019; two episodes remained unfilmed.

==== NBC ====
- Good Girls—Picked up for three additional episodes on August 14, 2019, bringing the episode count to 16; five episodes remained unfilmed.
- Superstore—Picked up for four additional episodes on November 5, 2019, bringing the episode count to 22; one episode remained unfilmed.

=== Renewals ===
==== ABC ====
- 20/20—Renewed for a forty-third season on May 21, 2020.
- America's Funniest Home Videos—Renewed for a thirty-first season on October 29, 2018.
- American Housewife—Renewed for a fifth season on May 21, 2020.
- American Idol—Renewed for a nineteenth season on May 15, 2020.
- The Bachelor—Renewed for a twenty-fifth season on May 21, 2020.
- Black-ish—Renewed for a seventh season on May 21, 2020.
- Celebrity Family Feud—Renewed for an eighth season on March 28, 2021.
- The Conners—Renewed for a third season on May 21, 2020.
- Dancing with the Stars—Renewed for a twenty-ninth season on May 21, 2020.
- For Life—Renewed for a second season on June 15, 2020.
- The Goldbergs—Renewed for an eighth season on May 21, 2020.
- The Good Doctor—Renewed for a fourth season on February 10, 2020.
- The Great Christmas Light Fight—Renewed for an eighth season on November 1, 2019.
- Grey's Anatomy—Renewed for a seventeenth season on May 10, 2019.
- Holey Moley—Renewed for a third and fourth season on February 22, 2021.
- A Million Little Things—Renewed for a third season on May 21, 2020.
- Mixed-ish—Renewed for a second season on May 21, 2020.
- Press Your Luck—Renewed for a third season on April 7, 2021.
- The Rookie—Renewed for a third season on May 21, 2020.
- Shark Tank—Renewed for a twelfth season on May 21, 2020.
- Station 19—Renewed for a fourth season on March 11, 2020.
- To Tell the Truth—Renewed for a sixth season on November 10, 2020.
- Who Wants to Be a Millionaire—Renewed for a twenty-second season on May 21, 2020.

==== CBS ====
- 48 Hours—Renewed for a thirty-third season on May 6, 2020.
- 60 Minutes—Renewed for a fifty-third season on May 6, 2020.
- All Rise—Renewed for a second season on May 6, 2020.
- Big Brother—Renewed for a twenty-third season on October 28, 2020.
- Blue Bloods—Renewed for an eleventh season on May 6, 2020.
- Bob Hearts Abishola—Renewed for a second season on May 6, 2020.
- Bull—Renewed for a fifth season on May 6, 2020.
- Evil—Renewed for a second season on October 22, 2019. It was announced on May 18, 2021, that the series would be moving to Paramount+.
- FBI—Renewed for a third season on May 6, 2020.
- FBI: Most Wanted—Renewed for a second season on May 6, 2020.
- The Greatest #AtHome Videos—Renewed for a second season on June 14, 2021.
- Love Island—Renewed for a third season on January 27, 2021.
- MacGyver—Renewed for a fifth and final season on May 6, 2020.
- Magnum P.I.—Renewed for a third season on May 6, 2020.
- Mom—Renewed for an eighth and final season on February 5, 2019.
- NCIS—Renewed for an eighteenth season on May 6, 2020.
- NCIS: Los Angeles—Renewed for a twelfth season on May 6, 2020.
- NCIS: New Orleans—Renewed for a seventh and final season on May 6, 2020.
- The Neighborhood—Renewed for a third season on May 6, 2020.
- SEAL Team—Renewed for a fourth season on May 6, 2020.
- Survivor—Renewed for a forty-first season on May 6, 2020, However, the series was delayed until 2021–22 due to COVID-19 pandemic.
- S.W.A.T.—Renewed for a fourth season on May 6, 2020.
- Tough as Nails—Renewed for a second season on August 12, 2020.
- Undercover Boss—Renewed for a tenth season on May 6, 2020.
- The Unicorn—Renewed for a second season on May 6, 2020.
- Young Sheldon—Renewed for a fourth season on February 22, 2019.

==== The CW ====
- All American—Renewed for a third season on January 7, 2020.
- Batwoman—Renewed for a second season on January 7, 2020.
- Black Lightning—Renewed for a fourth and final season on January 7, 2020.
- Bulletproof—Renewed for a third season on October 27, 2020.
- Burden of Truth—Renewed for a fourth and final season on October 27, 2020.
- Charmed—Renewed for a third season on January 7, 2020.
- The Christmas Caroler Challenge—Renewed for a second season on October 19, 2020.
- Coroner—Renewed for a second season on August 17, 2020.
- DC's Stargirl—Renewed for a second season on July 6, 2020.
- Dead Pixels—Renewed for a second season on April 29, 2021.
- Dynasty—Renewed for a fourth season on January 7, 2020.
- The Flash—Renewed for a seventh season on January 7, 2020.
- In the Dark—Renewed for a third season on January 7, 2020.
- Killer Camp—Renewed for a second season on March 8, 2021.
- Legacies—Renewed for a third season on January 7, 2020.
- Legends of Tomorrow—Renewed for a sixth season on January 7, 2020.
- Masters of Illusion—Renewed for an eleventh season on April 29, 2021.
- Mysteries Decoded—Renewed for a second season on April 7, 2022.
- Nancy Drew—Renewed for a second season on January 7, 2020.
- Penn & Teller: Fool Us—Renewed for an eighth season on May 14, 2020.
- Riverdale—Renewed for a fifth season on January 7, 2020.
- Roswell, New Mexico—Renewed for a third season on January 7, 2020.
- Supergirl—Renewed for a sixth and final season on January 7, 2020.
- Supernatural—The series was scheduled to end in May 2020, but seven episodes remained unaired in its fifteenth season due to the coronavirus pandemic shutting down filming and post-production in Vancouver, ergo pushing the series finale to Fall 2020.
- Tell Me a Story—Returned for the second season in fall 2020.
- Whose Line Is It Anyway?—Renewed for a seventeenth season on May 14, 2020.

==== Fox ====
- 9-1-1—Renewed for a fourth season on April 13, 2020.
- 9-1-1: Lone Star—Renewed for a second season on April 13, 2020.
- Bless the Harts—Renewed for a second season on October 18, 2019.
- Bob's Burgers—Renewed for an eleventh season on May 11, 2020.
- Duncanville—Renewed for a second season on April 6, 2020.
- Family Guy—Renewed for a nineteenth season on May 11, 2020.
- Last Man Standing—Renewed for a ninth and final season on May 19, 2020.
- Lego Masters—Renewed for a second season on November 11, 2020.
- The Masked Singer—Renewed for a fourth season on May 6, 2020.
- The Moodys—Renewed for a second season on July 10, 2020.
- Prodigal Son—Renewed for a second season on May 21, 2020.
- The Resident—Renewed for a fourth season on May 19, 2020.
- The Simpsons—Renewed for a thirty-second season on February 6, 2019.
- Thursday Night Football—Renewed for a seventh season on January 31, 2018; deal will go to a ninth season in 2022.

==== NBC ====
- America's Got Talent—Renewed for a sixteenth season on November 9, 2020.
- The Blacklist—Renewed for an eighth season on February 20, 2020.
- Brooklyn Nine-Nine—Renewed for an eighth and final season on November 14, 2019.
- Chicago Fire—Renewed for a ninth, tenth and eleventh season on February 27, 2020.
- Chicago Med—Renewed for a sixth, seventh and eighth season on February 27, 2020.
- Chicago P.D.—Renewed for an eighth, ninth and tenth season on February 27, 2020.
- Ellen's Game of Games—Renewed for a fourth season on February 18, 2020.
- Football Night in America—Renewed for a fifteenth season on December 14, 2011; deal will go to a seventeenth season in 2022.
- Good Girls—Renewed for a fourth season on May 15, 2020.
- Law & Order: Special Victims Unit—Renewed for a twenty-second, twenty-third and twenty-fourth season on February 27, 2020.
- Making It—Renewed for a third season on January 11, 2020.
- Manifest—Renewed for a third season on June 15, 2020.
- NBC Sunday Night Football—Renewed for a fifteenth season on December 14, 2011; deal will go to a seventeenth season in 2022.
- New Amsterdam—Renewed for a third, fourth, and fifth season on January 11, 2020.
- Superstore—Renewed for a sixth and final season on February 11, 2020.
- This Is Us—Renewed for a fifth and sixth season on May 12, 2019.
- The Voice—Renewed for a nineteenth season on June 16, 2020.
- The Wall—Renewed for a fourth season on September 30, 2020.
- Zoey's Extraordinary Playlist—Renewed for a second season on June 11, 2020.

=== Cancellations/series endings ===
==== ABC ====
- Agents of S.H.I.E.L.D.—It was announced on July 18, 2019, that season seven would be the final season. The series concluded on August 12, 2020.
- The Bachelor: The Greatest Seasons – Ever!–The retrospective miniseries was meant to run for one season only; it concluded on September 7, 2020.
- The Baker and the Beauty—Canceled on June 15, 2020.
- Bless This Mess—Canceled on May 21, 2020, after two seasons.
- Don't—Canceled on April 7, 2021.
- Emergence—Canceled on May 21, 2020.
- Fresh Off the Boat—It was announced on November 8, 2019, that season six would be the final season. The series concluded on February 21, 2020.
- How to Get Away with Murder—It was announced on July 11, 2019, that season six would be the final season. The series concluded on May 14, 2020.
- Kids Say the Darndest Things—Canceled on May 21, 2020. On December 17, 2020, it was announced that CBS would pick up the series for another season.
- The Last Dance—The documentary miniseries was meant to run for one season only; it concluded on June 20, 2020.
- Modern Family—It was announced on February 5, 2019, that season eleven would be the final season. The series concluded on April 8, 2020.
- Schooled—Canceled on May 21, 2020, after two seasons.
- Single Parents—Canceled on May 21, 2020, after two seasons.
- Stumptown—Canceled on September 16, 2020, due to COVID-related production delays, following the reversal of its May 2020 renewal.
- United We Fall—Canceled on September 15, 2020.

==== CBS ====
- Broke—Canceled on May 6, 2020. The series concluded on June 25, 2020.
- Carol's Second Act—Canceled on May 6, 2020.
- Criminal Minds—It was announced on January 10, 2019, that season fifteen would be the final season. The series concluded on February 19, 2020.
- God Friended Me—Canceled on April 14, 2020, after two seasons. The series concluded on April 26, 2020.
- Hawaii Five-0—It was announced on February 28, 2020, that season ten would be the final season. The series concluded on April 3, 2020.
- Madam Secretary—It was announced on May 15, 2019, that season six would be the final season. The series concluded on December 8, 2019.
- Man with a Plan—Canceled on May 6, 2020, after four seasons. The series concluded on June 11, 2020.
- Tommy—Canceled on May 6, 2020. The series concluded the following day.

==== The CW ====
- The 100—It was announced on August 4, 2019, that season seven would be the final season. The series concluded on September 30, 2020.
- Arrow—It was announced on March 6, 2019, that season eight would be the final season. The series concluded on January 28, 2020.
- Being Reuben—The documentary miniseries was meant to run for one season only; it concluded on September 11, 2020.
- Katy Keene—Canceled on July 2, 2020. This was the only cancellation of the season.
- Taskmaster—On August 5, 2020, The CW pulled the series from its prime-time schedule. The remaining episodes were made available on CW Seed on August 10, 2020.

==== Fox ====
- Almost Family—Canceled on March 2, 2020.
- Deputy—Canceled on April 3, 2020.
- Empire—It was announced on May 13, 2019, that season six would be the final season. The series concluded on April 21, 2020.
- Flirty Dancing—Canceled on May 18, 2020.
- Labor of Love—Canceled on September 8, 2021.
- Outmatched—Canceled on May 19, 2020.

==== NBC ====
- Blindspot—It was announced on May 10, 2019, that season five would be the final season. The series concluded on July 23, 2020.
- Bluff City Law—Canceled on June 15, 2020.
- Council of Dads—Canceled on June 25, 2020. The series concluded on July 2, 2020.
- The Good Place—It was announced on June 7, 2019, that season four would be the final season. The series concluded on January 30, 2020.
- Indebted—Canceled on June 15, 2020.
- Lincoln Rhyme: Hunt for the Bone Collector—Canceled on June 10, 2020.
- Perfect Harmony—Canceled on June 10, 2020.
- Sunnyside—On October 15, 2019, NBC pulled the series from its prime-time schedule, marking the first cancellation of the season. The remaining unaired episodes aired on NBC's website. The series was later canceled on June 15, 2020.
- Will & Grace—It was announced on July 25, 2019, that season eleven would be the final season. The series concluded on April 23, 2020.
- World of Dance—Canceled on March 15, 2021, after four seasons.

== See also ==
- 2019–20 Canadian network television schedule
- 2019–20 United States network television schedule (daytime)
- 2019–20 United States network television schedule (late night)
- Impact of the COVID-19 pandemic on television in the United States
