= Mike Tyson: The Knockout =

2021 television documentary series

- Genre: Documentary
- Country of origin: United States
- Original language: English
- No. of series: 1

Production
- Executive producers: Roxanna Sherwood; Geoffrey S. Fletcher

Original release
- Network: ABC
- Release: May 25 – June 1, 2021

Mike Tyson: The Knockout is an American two-part television documentary series about the life of boxing legend Mike Tyson which premiered on May 25, 2021, on ABC.

== Episodes ==
No.	Title	Original release date	U.S. viewers (millions)
1	"Part 1"	May 25, 2021	2.68
2	"Part 2"	June 1, 2021	2.68
