= House Calls with Dr. Phil =

2021 television documentary series

- Genre: Documentary
- Presented by: Phil McGraw
- Country of origin: United States
- Original language: English
- No. of seasons: 1
- No. of episodes: 6

Production
- Executive producers: Phil McGraw; Jay McGraw; Carla Pennington; Julia Eisenman; Sean Travis; Jeff Hyman
- Production companies: CBS Studios; Stage 29 Productions

Original release
- Network: CBS
- Release: August 18 – September 15, 2021

House Calls with Dr. Phil is an American television documentary series that aired on CBS from August 18 to September 15, 2021. In the series, Phil McGraw travels across the United States to visit and assist families.

== Episodes ==
No.	Title	Original release date	Prod. code	U.S. viewers (millions)
1	"Traumatized and Dramatized"	August 18, 2021	HC102	1.83
2	"Shake it Up to Break it Up"	August 25, 2021	HC101	1.78
3	"Check the Badge at the Door"	September 1, 2021	HC103	1.67
4	"Are You a Narcissist?"	September 8, 2021	HC104	1.69
5	"Marriage Isn't 50/50 It's 100/100?"	September 15, 2021	HC105	1.41
6	"Grow Up and Get Out"	September 15, 2021	HC106	1.27
