= Cherries Wild =

American game show

- Genre: Game show
- Created by: Wes Kauble
- Directed by: Ashley S. Gorman
- Presented by: Jason Biggs
- Narrated by: Rebecca Riedy
- Theme music composer: David Vanacore
- Country of origin: United States
- Original language: English
- No. of seasons: 1
- No. of episodes: 6

Production
- Executive producer: Wes Kauble
- Producers: Jason Biggs; Talia Harari; Brisa Hernandez
- Production location: Television City
- Editors: Nate Belt; Marc Gacill; Shawn Gutierrez; Emily Oates; Will Simpson; Jr Arinaga
- Production companies: Interrobang Entertainment; Fox Alternative Entertainment

Original release
- Network: Fox
- Release: February 21 – March 28, 2021

Cherries Wild is an American television game show that aired on Fox from February 21 to March 28, 2021. Hosted by Jason Biggs and sponsored by Pepsi Wild Cherry, it follows two rounds of trivia gameplay, during which a team of two contestants will try to "Solve the Slots" in hopes of getting close to win the $250,000 jackpot. At the end, when they spin the reels of the slot machine, contestants must try to capture all five wild cherries to win the ultimate prize.

== Gameplay ==
The goal of the game is to collect five cherries on the slot machine (Note: At the end of the show, a disclaimer appears which reads "The program does not use a real 'slot machine'. Each spin in a particular game is the product of a game play combination that is determined in advance by the program's producer. On each tape day, an independent outside compliance company randomly assigns those predetermined combinations to the contestant teams taping that day. At least one of the contestant teams on each tape day will receive a combination that has the potential to lead to the Grand Prize if the game is successfully played to its conclusion. At no point in the game do contestants put their own money at risk.") during the Payday round at the end of the game. To start the game, Biggs awards the contestants one Free Spin for the Payday round. Additional Free Spins and cherries can be earned during gameplay.

=== Question Round 1: Fact or Fiction ===
The board will reveal five statements (one for each of the reels on the machine). For each statement, the contestants will have to decide if it is true (Fact) or not (Fiction) and lock in their answer by pushing the reel's respective button. Each time the contestants choose correctly, the slot machine will reveal either cash (in varying amounts) for them to keep, a Free Spin (used during the Payday round), a Wild Cherry (which carries over into Payday, increasing the chance to win), a "WILD" space (which interrupts gameplay for a "Wild Moment" spin; see below). If a wrong answer is given, a red "X" will appear on the reel. After five questions, the round ends.

=== Question Round 2: One Big Question ===
Before starting the round, the team will select one of the two provided question themes off-camera. The board will then set the chosen theme for the round. Each reel will reveal a possible answer to a question. Choosing the correct answer (by pushing the respective button) will award the contestants in the same manner as "Fact or Fiction". However, if the contestant team can answer all five questions correctly, Biggs will award an additional Wild Cherry to be used during the Payday round. Any wrong answers will forfeit the Wild Cherry bonus but will continue the round until five questions have been played.

=== Wild Moment ===
This is a special bonus round which temporarily halts the ongoing game and gives the team a chance to immediately earn more cash for the Cash Stash or free spins for the end game. The players will control the spin by either stopping each of the five reels with its corresponding button (during the question rounds) or pulling the lever to trigger (in Payday).

=== Payday ===
At this time, the contestants will attempt to spin the slot machine so that it turns over five Wild Cherries in one turn. They will do this using the Free Spins they collected during the earlier two rounds. Any Wild Cherries earned in the front game are carried over to this round and lock a reel for each one. Any cash earned during the first two rounds sets a minimum payout called the "Cash Stash" which players can spend for additional spins.

During this round, the meanings of the symbols change:

- any "X"s revealed will forfeit any possible cash rewards on the other reels.
- a cherry will lock the reel and set the team one step closer to obtaining five cherries and the game's top prize of $250,000.
- any "WILD" spaces revealed will pause Payday and move the game to a "Wild Moment" spin.
- any cash amounts will be added to the Cash Stash for an option for the contestants to walk away with. If they spin again, the amounts do not roll over to the next spin.
- a "DOUBLE" will double all cash on revealed reels.

After each spin, Biggs will prompt the contestants with a decision: take the payday (the Cash Stash total plus the current money on the reels) and end the game or spin the reels again using a Free Spin. If the contestants are out of Free Spins, they can continue to play by forfeiting $10,000 from the Cash Stash to take an additional spin.

== Production ==
The series was picked up by Fox on December 16, 2020. Originally scheduled to premiere on February 14, 2021, it was postponed by one week due to weather delays at the 2021 Daytona 500.

== Episodes ==
No.	Title	Original release date	Prod. code	U.S. viewers (millions)
1	"Javier and Sha'tarra"	February 21, 2021	CHW-101	1.20
2	"Cara and Gwen"	February 28, 2021	CHW-102	1.28
3	"Bobby and Mike"	March 7, 2021	CHW-103	1.40
4	"Andy and Anthony"	March 14, 2021	CHW-104	1.51
5	"Lindsey and Marissa"	March 21, 2021	CHW-105	1.28
6	"Arnold and Arnold 2"	March 28, 2021	CHW-106	0.55

== Reception ==
In November 2021, the series was awarded the inaugural Advanced Advertising Innovation Award at the Advanced Advertising Summit for its support of the relaunch of Pepsi Wild Cherry. Tony Maglio, writing in TheWrap, described the show as "basically a glorified Pepsi commercial", further stating that it was a "wildly failed experiment", due to the very poor viewership figures of the final episode. In a 2 star out of 5 review by Melissa Camacho for Common Sense Media, it was stated that "many of the questions are extremely easy", with Camacho concluding that "Ultimately, it isn't the most sophisticated of game shows, but one that's fun enough for a half an hour."

=== U.S. ratings ===
Viewership and ratings per episode of Cherries Wild
No.	Title	Air date	Rating/share (18–49)	Viewers (millions)	DVR (18–49)	DVR viewers (millions)	Total (18–49)	Total viewers (millions)
1	"Javier and Sha'tarra"	February 21, 2021	0.3/2	1.20	—N/a	—N/a	—N/a	—N/a
2	"Cara and Gwen"	February 28, 2021	0.3/2	1.28	—N/a	—N/a	—N/a	—N/a
3	"Bobby and Mike"	March 7, 2021	0.3/2	1.40	—N/a	—N/a	—N/a	—N/a
4	"Andy and Anthony"	March 14, 2021	0.4/3	1.51	—N/a	—N/a	—N/a	—N/a
5	"Lindsey and Marissa"	March 21, 2021	0.3/2	1.28	—N/a	—N/a	—N/a	—N/a
6	"Arnold and Arnold 2"	March 28, 2021	0.1/1	0.55	0.0	0.07	0.2	0.62
