= Emergency Call (2020 TV series) =

American unscripted television series

- Genre: Docudrama
- Presented by: Luke Wilson
- Country of origin: United States
- Original language: English
- No. of seasons: 1
- No. of episodes: 10

Production
- Executive producers: Adeline Ramage Rooney; Grant Kahler; Luke Wilson
- Running time: 44 minutes (without commercials)
- Production company: 8HOURS Television

Original release
- Network: ABC
- Release: September 28, 2020 – July 2, 2021

Related
- Emergency Call Australia

Emergency Call is an American unscripted television series which airs on ABC. It is an adaptation of an original Belgian format. ABC picked up the series in 2020 for an initial cycle of ten episodes, with Luke Wilson as host; the series premiered on September 28, 2020.

The first season features the work of 9-1-1 dispatchers in Austin, Texas; New Orleans, Louisiana; Waukesha, Wisconsin; Wasilla, Alaska; and Ogden, Utah.

== Episodes ==
No.	Title	Original release date	U.S. viewers (millions)
1	"Take a Deep Breath"	September 28, 2020	3.88
2	"Conductors of Chaos"	October 5, 2020	2.96
3	"Close to Home"	October 12, 2020	2.77
4	"Crime Spree"	October 19, 2020	2.63
5	"Headset Heroes"	October 26, 2020	2.60
6	"Texting Trouble"	June 4, 2021	2.98
7	"Planes, Trains and Auto Defrost"	June 11, 2021	2.88
8	"Held Hostage"	June 18, 2021	2.83
9	"A Grizzly Mystery"	June 25, 2021	3.00
10	"Cliffhanger"	July 2, 2021	2.75

== Reception ==
Viewership and ratings per episode of Emergency Call
No.	Title	Air date	Rating (18–49)	Viewers (millions)	DVR (18–49)	DVR viewers (millions)	Total (18–49)	Total viewers (millions)
1	"Take a Deep Breath"	September 28, 2020	0.6	3.88	TBD	TBD	TBD	TBD
2	"Conductors of Chaos"	October 5, 2020	0.5	2.96	TBD	TBD	TBD	TBD
3	"Close to Home"	October 12, 2020	0.4	2.77	TBD	TBD	TBD	TBD
4	"Crime Spree"	October 19, 2020	0.4	2.63	TBD	TBD	TBD	TBD
5	"Headset Heroes"	October 26, 2020	0.4	2.60	TBD	TBD	TBD	TBD
6	"Texting Trouble"	June 4, 2021	0.4	2.98	0.1	0.51	0.4	3.48
7	"Planes, Trains and Auto Defrost"	June 11, 2021	0.4	2.88	0.1	0.52	0.4	3.40
8	"Held Hostage"	June 18, 2021	0.3	2.83	0.1	0.46	0.4	3.29
9	"A Grizzly Mystery"	June 25, 2021	0.4	3.00	0.1	0.51	0.5	3.51
10	"Cliffhanger"	July 2, 2021	0.4	2.75	0.1	0.44	0.4	3.19
