= The Hustler (American game show) =

American game show

- Genre: Game show
- Created by: Richard Bacon
- Directed by: Ryan Polito
- Presented by: Craig Ferguson
- Country of origin: United States
- Original language: English
- No. of seasons: 2
- No. of episodes: 19

Production
- Executive producers: Jack Burgess; Richard Bacon; Stephen Lambert; Susan House; Tim Harcourt
- Production companies: All3Media America; Studio Lambert

Original release
- Network: ABC
- Release: January 4 – September 23, 2021

The Hustler is an American television game show that aired on ABC from January 4 to September 23, 2021. Hosted by Craig Ferguson, it follows five contestants who collaborate to build up a cash prize by answering a series of trivia questions. One of the contestants is secretly designated as the Hustler beforehand and given the answers to all the questions. By the end of the game, two of the honest contestants have been eliminated; the other two must correctly choose the Hustler in order to stop them from winning the entire prize.

In April 2022, it was reported that the series had been cancelled.

== Gameplay ==
The game consists of a total of 10 questions, each with four multiple-choice options. All of the questions are themed after the Hustler's personal life and interests. A hint about the Hustler is revealed on each turn, and the question is related to it. For example, if the clue indicates the Hustler is a fan of a particular television show, the question might concern a detail about that show.

The team is given 60 seconds to discuss the question and decide on an answer. The Hustler has been given all the correct answers ahead of time and may use this knowledge as desired throughout the game. If the players do not reach a consensus before time runs out, they are given a few extra seconds to choose a response; a failure to do so forfeits the money for that turn. Each of the first nine questions adds $10,000 to the bank for a correct answer, while the last question doubles the entire total for a correct answer or cuts it in half for an incorrect answer. The team can bank up to $180,000 over the course of the game.

=== Eliminations ===
The Hustler eliminates one honest contestant each after the third and sixth questions. To protect their identity, every contestant is given a ballot with all five names and must mark one of them. The contestants place their ballots in envelopes and give them to the host, who sends them out of the studio via pneumatic tube capsule. The honest contestants' votes are discarded, and the Hustler's choice is eliminated with no winnings and must leave the studio through an exit concealed in a bookcase.

=== Final vote ===
After the tenth question, the three remaining contestants each declare their guess at the Hustler's identity by placing cards with that person's name in front of their chairs. They are then given two minutes to debate the issue and may change their votes as desired during this period.

The true Hustler then stands up. If both of the honest contestants have voted correctly, they split the bank. Otherwise, the Hustler wins the entire bank.

== Episodes ==
=== Series overview ===
Season	Episodes	Originally released	
Season	Episodes	First released	Last released
1	8	January 4, 2021	February 25, 2021
2	11	June 17, 2021	September 23, 2021

=== Season 1 (2021) ===
No. overall	No. in season	Title	Original release date	Prod. code	U.S. viewers (millions)
1	1	"A Puzzle, Wrapped In An Enigma, Tattooed In Mystery"	January 4, 2021	105	2.08
2	2	"Have You Ever Stabbed a Melon?"	January 7, 2021	103	3.99
3	3	"The Ultimate Game of Deception"	January 14, 2021	101	3.29
4	4	"Watch Out for the Quiet Ones"	January 21, 2021	104	2.81
5	5	"How To Spot a Liar"	January 28, 2021	106	3.05
6	6	"Sweet Deceit, Salty Insinuations, Spicy Revelations"	February 11, 2021	102	2.56
7	7	"Every Tic Could Be a Tell"	February 18, 2021	108	2.67
8	8	"A Little Bit of Finger Pointing"	February 25, 2021	107	2.66

=== Season 2 (2021) ===
No. overall	No. in season	Title	Original release date	Prod. code	U.S. viewers (millions)
9	1	"The Most Diabolical Game on Television"	June 17, 2021	205	2.00
10	2	"Next Level Hustle"	June 24, 2021	201	1.99
11	3	"Pick the Weird Stuff"	July 1, 2021	206	1.95
12	4	"That's A Lot of Whips"	July 15, 2021	204	1.86
13	5	"It's Not Shame, It's Just The Game"	July 22, 2021	207	1.70
14	6	"Teamwork, HUZZAH!"	August 12, 2021	203	1.60
15	7	"You're Overcompensating!"	August 19, 2021	211	1.71
16	8	"A Real Imposter At Work"	September 9, 2021	208	1.29
17	9	"Who's Twitchy Here?"	September 16, 2021	202	1.59
18	10	"Connive and Strive"	September 23, 2021	209	1.85
19	11	"A Little of This, A Little of That"	September 23, 2021	210	1.66

== Production ==
The series was picked up by ABC on October 12, 2019, and began production during late fall. The series premiered as a sneak preview on January 4, 2021, before moving to its regular timeslot on January 7, 2021. On April 7, 2021, the series was renewed for a second season, which premiered on June 17, 2021.

On April 1, 2022, it was reported that the series had been cancelled after two seasons.

== Reception ==
=== Ratings ===
==== Season 1 ====
Viewership and ratings per episode of The Hustler
No.	Title	Air date	Rating (18–49)	Viewers (millions)	DVR (18–49)	DVR viewers (millions)	Total (18–49)	Total viewers (millions)
1	"A Puzzle, Wrapped In An Enigma, Tattooed In Mystery"	January 4, 2021	0.5	2.08	—N/a	0.71	—N/a	2.79
2	"Have You Ever Stabbed a Melon?"	January 7, 2021	0.7	3.99	0.2	0.74	0.9	4.73
3	"The Ultimate Game of Deception"	January 14, 2021	0.6	3.29	—N/a	0.75	—N/a	4.04
4	"Watch Out for the Quiet Ones"	January 21, 2021	0.5	2.81	—N/a	0.59	—N/a	3.40 (Note: Live+7 ratings were not available, so Live+3 ratings have been used instead.)
5	"How to Spot a Liar"	January 28, 2021	0.5	3.05	—N/a	—N/a	—N/a	—N/a
6	"Sweet Deceit, Salty Insinuations, Spicy Revelations"	February 11, 2021	0.5	2.56	—N/a	—N/a	—N/a	—N/a
7	"Every Tic Could Be a Tell"	February 18, 2021	0.5	2.67	—N/a	0.61	—N/a	3.28
8	"A Little Bit of Finger Pointing"	February 25, 2021	0.4	2.66	—N/a	0.54	—N/a	3.19

==== Season 2 ====
Viewership and ratings per episode of The Hustler
No.	Title	Air date	Rating (18–49)	Viewers (millions)	DVR (18–49)	DVR viewers (millions)	Total (18–49)	Total viewers (millions)
1	"The Most Diabolical Game on Television"	June 17, 2021	0.3	2.00	0.1	0.74	0.5	2.74
2	"Next Level Hustle"	June 24, 2021	0.4	1.99	0.1	0.59	0.5	2.58
3	"Pick the Weird Stuff"	July 1, 2021	0.3	1.95	0.1	0.53	0.4	2.48
4	"That's A Lot of Whips"	July 15, 2021	0.4	1.86	0.1	0.46	0.4	2.32
5	"It's Not Shame, It's Just The Game"	July 22, 2021	0.3	1.70	0.1	0.44	0.4	2.14
6	"Teamwork, HUZZAH!"	August 12, 2021	0.3	1.60	0.1	0.54	0.3	2.14
7	"You're Overcompensating!"	August 19, 2021	0.3	1.71	0.1	0.57	0.4	2.29
8	"A Real Imposter At Work"	September 9, 2021	0.2	1.29	—N/a	—N/a	—N/a	—N/a
9	"Who's Twitchy Here?"	September 16, 2021	0.2	1.59	—N/a	—N/a	—N/a	—N/a
10	"Connive and Strive"	September 23, 2021	0.3	1.85	0.1	0.38	0.4	2.23
11	"A Little of This, A Little of That"	September 23, 2021	0.3	1.66	0.1	0.36	0.4	2.03
