= Superstar (American TV series) =

2021 television documentary series

- Genre: Documentary
- Country of origin: United States
- Original language: English
- No. of seasons: 2
- No. of episodes: 10

Production
- Executive producers: David Sloan; Muriel Pearson
- Production company: ABC News Studios

Original release
- Network: ABC
- Release: August 11, 2021 – June 14, 2023

Superstar is an American television documentary series about the lives of celebrities that shaped American culture. It aired on ABC from August 11, 2021 to June 14, 2023.

The second season premiered on December 8, 2022.

== Episodes ==
=== Series overview ===
| Season | Episodes | Originally released | |
| Season | Episodes | First released | Last released |
|---|---|---|---|
| 1 | 7 | August 11, 2021 | April 14, 2022 |
| 2 | 3 | December 8, 2022 | June 14, 2023 |

=== Season 1 (2021–22) ===
| No. overall | No. in season | Title | Original release date | Prod. code | U.S. viewers (millions) |
|---|---|---|---|---|---|
| 1 | 1 | "Whitney Houston" | August 11, 2021 | 101 | 2.88 |
| 2 | 2 | "Kobe Bryant" | August 18, 2021 | 102 | 1.81 |
| 3 | 3 | "John Ritter" | August 25, 2021 | 103 | 2.56 |
| 4 | 4 | "Richard Pryor" | September 1, 2021 | 104 | 1.84 |
| 5 | 5 | "Robin Williams" | October 20, 2021 | 105 | 1.75 |
| 6 | 6 | "George Michael" | November 30, 2021 | 106 | 1.84 |
| 7 | 7 | "Patrick Swayze" | April 14, 2022 | 107 | 2.26 |

=== Season 2 (2022–23) ===
| No. overall | No. in season | Title | Original release date | Prod. code | U.S. viewers (millions) |
|---|---|---|---|---|---|
| 8 | 1 | "Reba McEntire" | December 8, 2022 | 201 | 2.58 |
| 9 | 2 | "Elizabeth Taylor" | May 14, 2023 | 203 | 2.76 |
| 10 | 3 | "Aaliyah" | June 14, 2023 | 202 | 1.34 |

== Reception ==
=== Season 1 ===
Viewership and ratings per episode of Superstar
| No. | Title | Air date | Timeslot (ET) | Rating/share (18–49) | Viewers (millions) | DVR (18–49) | DVR viewers (millions) | Total (18–49) | Total viewers (millions) |
|---|---|---|---|---|---|---|---|---|---|
| 1 | "Whitney Houston" | August 11, 2021 | Wednesday 10:00 p.m. | 0.4/3 | 2.88 | 0.2 | 0.82 | 0.5 | 3.70 |
| 2 | "Kobe Bryant" | August 18, 2021 | Wednesday 10:00 p.m. | 0.3/2 | 1.81 | 0.1 | 0.36 | 0.4 | 2.17 |
| 3 | "John Ritter" | August 25, 2021 | Wednesday 10:00 p.m. | 0.3/3 | 2.56 | —N/a | —N/a | —N/a | —N/a |
| 4 | "Richard Pryor" | September 1, 2021 | Wednesday 10:00 p.m. | 0.3/2 | 1.84 | —N/a | —N/a | —N/a | —N/a |
| 5 | "Robin Williams" | October 20, 2021 | Wednesday 10:00 p.m. | 0.3/2 | 1.75 | 0.1 | 0.45 | 0.3 | 2.20 |
| 6 | "George Michael" | November 30, 2021 | Tuesday 10:01 p.m. | 0.3/2 | 1.84 | 0.1 | 0.35 | 0.3 | 2.18 |
| 7 | "Patrick Swayze" | April 14, 2022 | Thursday 10:01 p.m. | 0.2/2 | 2.26 | 0.1 | 0.78 | 0.4 | 3.04 |

=== Season 2 ===
Viewership and ratings per episode of Superstar
| No. | Title | Air date | Timeslot (ET) | Rating/share (18–49) | Viewers (millions) | DVR (18–49) | DVR viewers (millions) | Total (18–49) | Total viewers (millions) |
|---|---|---|---|---|---|---|---|---|---|
| 1 | "Reba McEntire" | December 8, 2022 | Thursday 10:01 p.m. | 0.2/2 | 2.58 | 0.0 | 0.45 | 0.2 | 3.03 (Note: Live+7 ratings were unavailable, so Live+3 ratings have been used instead.) |
| 2 | "Elizabeth Taylor" | May 14, 2023 | Sunday 10:00 p.m. | 0.3/3 | 2.76 | —N/a | —N/a | —N/a | —N/a |
| 3 | "Aaliyah" | June 14, 2023 | Wednesday 10:00 p.m. | 0.2/2 | 1.34 | —N/a | —N/a | —N/a | —N/a |
