= The Greatest @Home Videos =

American reality television series

- Genre: Clip show; Comedy
- Presented by: Cedric the Entertainer
- Country of origin: United States
- Original language: English
- No. of seasons: 2
- No. of episodes: 16 (+ 13 segments)

Production
- Executive producers: Robert Horowitz; Lewis Fenton; Cedric the Entertainer; Eric Rhône
- Production companies: JUMA Entertainment; A Bird and a Bear Entertainment

Original release
- Network: CBS
- Release: May 15, 2020 – present

The Greatest @Home Videos (formerly The Greatest #AtHome Videos) is an American video clip television series for CBS. Executive produced and hosted by Cedric the Entertainer, the series was produced to fill in primetime broadcast hours due to production shutdowns during the COVID-19 pandemic.

The series initially premiered on CBS as a one-off special The Greatest #StayAtHome Videos on May 15, 2020. On July 2, 2020, the series received a back order of four episodes bringing the first half's total episode count up to five.

On August 26, 2020, CBS announced that the second half of season one would premiere on September 25, 2020, as replacement programming for Fall 2020.

On June 14, 2021, the series was renewed for a second season, which premiered on August 20, 2021.

== Format ==
People who were bored used apps such as TikTok to create videos which CBS said "reflect the creativity, humor and humanity that have emerged from our shared experiences over the past few months." Videos from various sources such as YouTube were put together in one place. Some videos are funny, some touching, and some inspiring. For each video shown, those who made it get to select a charity for CBS to donate to.

== Episodes ==
=== Series overview ===
Season	Episodes		Originally released	
Season	Episodes		First released	Last released
Special			May 15, 2020	
1	10	4	July 24, 2020	August 14, 2020
1	10	6	September 25, 2020	November 6, 2020
2	6	4	August 20, 2021	September 17, 2021
2	6	2	December 17, 2021	
Specials	13		November 11, 2022	September 18, 2026

=== Special (2020) ===
Title	Original release date	Prod. code	U.S. viewers (millions)
"The Greatest #StayAtHome Videos"	May 15, 2020	100	4.42

=== Season 1 (2020) ===
No. overall	No. in season	Title	Original release date	Prod. code	U.S. viewers (millions)
Part 1
1	1	"Lights, Creation, Creativity!"	July 24, 2020	101	3.49
2	2	"Mining Internet Gold"	July 31, 2020	102	3.26
3	3	"Do It One More Time"	August 7, 2020	103	3.71
4	4	"A Wicked Surprise"	August 14, 2020	104	3.83
Part 2
5	5	"School & Sports Are Back!"	September 25, 2020	105	3.20
6	6	"Awesome Thrills, Insane Skills & #CelebsAtHome"	October 2, 2020	106	3.57
7	7	"A Football Star with Broadway Aspirations"	October 9, 2020	107	3.27
8	8	"The New 'At-Home' Normal: Working, Studying & Exercising"	October 16, 2020	108	3.26
9	9	"Dracula the Entertainer"	October 30, 2020	109	3.20
10	10	"Uplifting & Heartfelt"	November 6, 2020	110	3.26

=== Season 2 (2021) ===
No. overall	No. in season	Title	Original release date	Prod. code	U.S. viewers (millions)
Part 1
11	1	"Let Paula Be the Judge"	August 20, 2021	GAH201	2.07
12	2	"Too Cute to Be Real"	August 27, 2021	GAH202	1.90
13	3	"Max in the Neighborhood"	September 3, 2021	GAH203	2.01
14	4	"He's a Smoove Operator"	September 17, 2021	GAH204	1.70
Part 2
15	5	"'Tis the Season to Share Videos"	December 17, 2021	GAH205	2.81
16	6	"Home Videos for the Holidays"	December 17, 2021	GAH206	2.37

=== Specials (2022–26) ===
Title	Original release date	Prod. code	U.S. viewers (millions)
"The Greatest @Home Videos: Thanks & Giving"	November 11, 2022	301	3.00
"The Greatest @Home Videos: Holiday Special"	December 16, 2022	302	1.79
"The Cedys"	February 17, 2023	303	3.38
"The Greatest @Home Videos - June 2, 2023"	June 2, 2023	304	2.75
"The Greatest @Home Videos - November 24, 2023"	November 24, 2023	401	2.08
"The Greatest @Home Videos: The CEDY Awards"	January 5, 2024	402	2.81
"The Greatest @Home Videos: Father's Day Edition"	June 14, 2024	403	N/A
"The Greatest @Home Videos - September 27, 2024"	September 27, 2024	404	N/A
"The Greatest @Home Videos: Holiday Edition"	December 27, 2024	501	2.38
"The Greatest @Home Videos: Cedy Awards"	January 3, 2025	502	N/A
"The Greatest @Home Videos - May 16, 2025"	May 16, 2025	503	N/A
"The Greatest @Home Videos - Memorial Day Edition"	May 23, 2025	504	N/A
"The Greatest @Home Videos: The CEDY Awards"	September 18, 2026	601	N/A

== Development ==
In an interview, Cedric the Entertainer explained that making these videos helped people stay connected and feel that life was something close to normal. One episode features a group of children giving Tony Hawk a skateboard as a gift with the help of their area's FedEx driver. An example of the creativity in the original special includes a man looking out an airplane window drinking wine, which in fact is taking place in a laundry room with the glass in the washing machine. Each episode was filmed with as few people as possible, using social distancing and taking precautions with people entering Cedric's house.
