= The FBI Declassified =

2021 television documentary series

- Genre: Documentary
- Directed by: Matthew DeVoe
- Narrated by: Alana de la Garza
- Country of origin: United States
- Original language: English
- No. of seasons: 1
- No. of episodes: 6

Production
- Executive producer: Anthony Batson

Original release
- Network: CBS
- Release: October 6, 2020 – August 18, 2021

The FBI Declassified is an American television documentary series that premiered on October 6, 2020 on CBS.

== Episodes ==
No.	Title	Original release date	Prod. code	U.S. viewers (millions)
1	"Saving Ethan"	October 6, 2020	101	3.33
2013 Alabama bunker hostage crisis
2	"The Spies Next Door"	October 13, 2020	102	3.76
Vicky Peláez
3	"20 Days of Terror: The Austin Bomber"	October 20, 2020	103	2.81
Austin serial bombings
4	"The Swindling Seductress"	October 27, 2020	104	2.53
Dana Michelle Lawrence
5	"Dangerous Journey on the Silk Road"	November 10, 2020	105	2.80
Ross Ulbricht
6	"Enemy of the State"	August 18, 2021	106	1.79
Edward McLarnon
