= When Nature Calls with Helen Mirren =

American television comedy reality show

- Genre: Comedy
- Based on: Walk on the Wild Side
- Narrated by: Helen Mirren
- Country of origin: United States
- Original language: English
- No. of seasons: 1
- No. of episodes: 10

Production
- Executive producers: Ryan O'Dowd; K.P. Anderson; Brad Stevens; Boyd Vico
- Production company: BBC Studios America

Original release
- Network: ABC
- Release: June 24, 2021 – January 1, 2022

When Nature Calls with Helen Mirren is an American comedy series that aired on ABC from June 24, 2021, to January 1, 2022.

According to ABC, the series "features comedians putting words into the mouths of beautiful beasts, teeny-tiny frogs, beatboxing badgers and more in captivating footage from all over the world."

== Production ==
On April 6, 2021, it was announced that ABC had ordered the series with Ryan O'Dowd as executive producer, alongside K.P. Anderson. On April 7, 2021, it was announced that the series would premiere on June 17, 2021, later being rescheduled to June 24, 2021. It was also announced that Helen Mirren would serve as the narrator of the show.

The series is produced by BBC Studios, and is an adaptation of the BBC show Walk on the Wild Side.

== Episodes ==
No.	Title	Original release date	Prod. code	U.S. viewers (millions)	Rating (18–49)
1	"Let's Begin at the Beginning"	June 24, 2021	102	3.69	0.5
2	"Sup?"	July 1, 2021	101	2.79	0.3
3	"Dastardly Death Gunk Stuff"	July 15, 2021	103	2.63	0.3
4	"A Partial In-Ground Pool"	July 22, 2021	104	1.90	0.3
5	"My Jingle Balls"	August 12, 2021	105	1.55	0.2
6	"Nature's Justice"	August 19, 2021	106	1.45	0.2
7	"Uncle Antelope's Truth Bombs"	September 9, 2021	107	1.19	0.2
8	"The Burger Hole"	September 16, 2021	108	1.31	0.2
9	"The Optimistic Mosquito"	January 1, 2022	109	1.24	0.2
10	"Omen Cat"	January 1, 2022	110	0.97	0.1

== Ratings ==
Viewership and ratings per episode of When Nature Calls with Helen Mirren
No.	Title	Air date	Rating (18–49)	Viewers (millions)	DVR (18–49)	DVR viewers (millions)	Total (18–49)	Total viewers (millions)
1	"Let's Begin at the Beginning"	June 24, 2021	0.5	3.69	0.1	0.53	0.6	4.22
2	"Sup?"	July 1, 2021	0.3	2.79	0.0	0.37	0.4	3.16
3	"Dastardly Death Gunk Stuff"	July 15, 2021	0.3	2.63	0.0	0.22	0.3	2.85
4	"A Partial In-Ground Pool"	July 22, 2021	0.3	1.90	0.0	0.20	0.3	2.10
5	"My Jingle Balls"	August 12, 2021	0.2	1.55	0.1	0.24	0.3	1.78
6	"Nature's Justice"	August 19, 2021	0.2	1.45	0.0	0.21	0.2	1.66
7	"Uncle Antelope's Truth Bombs"	September 9, 2021	0.2	1.19	—N/a	—N/a	—N/a	—N/a
8	"The Burger Hole"	September 16, 2021	0.2	1.31	—N/a	—N/a	—N/a	—N/a
9	"The Optimistic Mosquito"	January 1, 2022	0.2	1.24	—N/a	—N/a	—N/a	—N/a
10	"Omen Cat"	January 1, 2022	0.1	0.97	—N/a	—N/a	—N/a	—N/a
