= Mysteries Decoded =

2019 television documentary series

- Season 2 poster
- Genre: Documentary
- Presented by: Jennifer Marshall
- Theme music composer: Ramón Balcázar
- Country of origin: United States
- Original language: English
- No. of seasons: 2
- No. of episodes: 24 (+1 special)

Production
- Executive producers: Gary Tarpinian; Paninee Theeranuntawat
- Producers: Gary Benthin; James Millican; Brandon Gilbrech
- Cinematography: Oktay Ortabasi
- Editors: Duncan Sinclair; Jeff Schiro; Will Ilgen; Jacob Cooper; Jennifer Belleville; Delaney Bishop; Alex Elias Scott; Reggie Bourdeau; Josh Kadish; Brian Guerrero
- Production company: MorningStar Entertainment

Original release
- Network: The CW
- Release: January 10, 2019 – October 4, 2022

Mysteries Decoded is an American television documentary series that premiered on January 10, 2019 on The CW. The show is hosted by Jennifer Marshall, a United States Navy veteran turned private investigator.

In 2020, it aired updated versions of some of its episodes featuring new interviews. In April 2022 the series was renewed for a second season which premiered on July 6, 2022. A special aired in October 2022. It was renewed for a third season in May 2023. The show was however later canceled, with no third season being aired.

== Episodes ==
=== Series overview ===
| Season | Episodes | Originally released | |
| Season | Episodes | First released | Last released |
|---|---|---|---|
| 1 | 9 | January 10, 2019 | October 31, 2019 |
| Updates | 7 | August 20, 2020 | October 1, 2020 |
| 2 | 8 | July 6, 2022 | August 24, 2022 |
| Special | 1 | October 4, 2022 | |

=== Season 1 (2019) ===
| No. overall | No. in season | Title | Directed by | Original release date | U.S. viewers (millions) |
|---|---|---|---|---|---|
| 1 | 1 | "Roswell" "Roswell: Mysteries Decoded" | Jerry McNutt | January 10, 2019 | 0.93 |
Jennifer Marshall and Ufologist Ryan Sprague investigate the Roswell incident and the alleged claims of a military cover-up of a UFO crash after a scientist claims to have found the remains of the spacecraft.
| 2 | 2 | "Lizzie Borden" | Eric Salat | August 13, 2019 | 0.48 |
Marshall alongside historian and psychic medium Stephanie Bingham investigates whether Lizzie Borden was really responsible for the murder of her parents or it was a result of supernatural activity.
| 3 | 3 | "Mothman" | Eric Salat | August 20, 2019 | 0.61 |
Marshall and paranormal investigator M. J. Banias investigate the legend of the Mothman of West Virginia after allegations of new photographic evidence.
| 4 | 4 | "The Montauk Experiments" | Mark Therrien | August 27, 2019 | 0.57 |
Marshall and conspiracy researcher Sam Tripoli investigate the Montauk Project conspiracy after claims of evidence of a secret compound beneath the Montauk Air Force Station where the supposed government projects were conducted.
| 5 | 5 | "Area 51" | Jerry McNutt | September 10, 2019 | 0.54 |
Marshall and Sprague investigate the Storm Area 51 event and the truth of Area 51 after Bob Lazar, a man claiming to be a whistleblower, resurfaces with claims of UFOs at the site.
| 6 | 6 | "The Bermuda Triangle" | Mark Therrien | September 17, 2019 | 0.49 |
Marshall and fellow US Navy veteran Jordan Hunter investigate the disappearance of Flight 19 and the USS Cyclops in the Bermuda Triangle after claims of evidence that planes and ships have been disappearing in the area due to a phenomenon affecting the fabric of space and time.
| 7 | 7 | "Witches of Salem" | Eric Salat | September 24, 2019 | 0.48 |
Marshall alongside journalist and occultist Sarah Lyons investigates the Salem witch trials and claims of reemergence of the affliction that caused the trials after students at the Essex Agricultural and Technical High School start falling ill.
| 8 | 8 | "Bigfoot" | Jerry McNutt | September 29, 2019 | 0.51 |
Marshall heads to British Columbia to investigate the claims of Bigfoot's existence alongside podcaster and cryptozoologist Andrew Sanford after claims of new videographic and audio evidence regarding the creature's existence surface.
| 9 | 9 | "Vampires of New Orleans" | Jerry McNutt | October 31, 2019 | 0.59 |
Marshall along with writer and self-proclaimed vampire Vincent Curiel investigates the truth about the legend of Jacques St. Germain, fabled to be still alive as a vampire in New Orleans, after allegations of recent sightings.

=== Season 1 Updates (2020) ===
| No. overall | No. in season | Title | Directed by | Original release date | U.S. viewers (millions) |
|---|---|---|---|---|---|
| 10 | 1 | "Bigfoot: Revisited" | Jerry McNutt | August 20, 2020 | 0.78 |
Marshall and Sanford re-examine the mystery of the Bigfoot after officials at the Washington State Department of Transportation claim to have evidence of its existence.
| 11 | 2 | "Mothman: Revisited" | Eric Salat | August 27, 2020 | 0.73 |
Marshall and Banias re-examine the Mothman legend after reports of sightings in Chicago, far away from West Virginia where the legend originated.
| 12 | 3 | "Roswell: Revisited" | Jerry McNutt | September 3, 2020 | 0.76 |
Marshall and Sprague re-examine the Roswell conspiracy theories following people claiming to be witnesses stating that Wright-Patterson Air Force Base houses the remains of the crashed spacecraft.
| 13 | 4 | "Bermuda Triangle: Revisited" | Mark Therrien | September 10, 2020 | 0.82 |
After failing to find any paranormal explanation for planes and ships disappearing in the Bermuda Triangle, Hunter and Marshall examine whether actual natural reasons might be behind it.
| 14 | 5 | "Area 51: Revisited" | Jerry McNutt | September 17, 2020 | 0.71 |
Marshall and Sprague get an eyewitness account of the Storm Area 51 event from Ufologist Jane Kyle and examine photographs of the area, including buildings recently constructed at the base.
| 15 | 6 | "The Montauk Experiments: Revisited" | Mark Therrien | September 24, 2020 | 0.75 |
Marshall brings in Jim Darling, a former radar operator at the Montauk Air Base, to debunk claims of testing at the site and examines footage sent by Tripoli which he claims is proof of time travel.
| 16 | 7 | "Witches of Salem: Revisited" | Eric Salat | October 1, 2020 | 0.73 |
Marshall and Lyons discuss incidents of mass psychogenic illness and them being blamed on supernatural forces, while also examining whether the mass panic around the COVID-19 pandemic is similar to it.

=== Season 2 (2022) ===
| No. overall | No. in season | Title | Directed by | Original release date | U.S. viewers (millions) |
|---|---|---|---|---|---|
| 17 | 1 | "Curse of the Conjuring House" | Jerry McNutt | July 6, 2022 | 0.50 |
Marshall and paranormal investigator Sara Gray investigate the house once owned by the Perron family in Harrisville, Rhode Island, made famous by the investigation of Ed and Lorraine Warren into whether it was haunted, after the current owners report possible supernatural happenings.
| 18 | 2 | "Alien Mountain" | Jerry McNutt | July 13, 2022 | 0.53 |
Marshall travels to Dulce, New Mexico to investigate the conspiracy of Dulce Base, an alleged facility jointly run by humans and aliens beneath a nearby mountain, alongside paranormal investigator Heather Taddy after new reports of UFO sightings.
| 19 | 3 | "Werewolves of Kentucky" | Andrew DeJohn & Jerry McNutt | July 20, 2022 | 0.52 |
Marshall along with paranormal investigator Heidi Hollis investigates the legend of werewolves living in the Bluegrass region of Kentucky, after recent claims of them attacking livestock.
| 20 | 4 | "Horror Hotel" | Jerry McNutt | July 27, 2022 | 0.58 |
Marshal alongside journalist and paranormal investigator Ozzy Mora investigates the Cecil Hotel in Los Angeles and whether it is truly haunted.
| 21 | 5 | "Sleep Demons" | Jerry McNutt | August 3, 2022 | 0.41 |
Marshall and paranormal investigator Ali Houmani investigate the claims of demons haunting people in their sleep and killing them.
| 22 | 6 | "Lake Champlain Monster" | Jerry McNutt | August 10, 2022 | 0.43 |
Marshall and cryptozoologist Nick Valenzuela try to ascertain the truth of the monster called "Champ", alleged to be living underwater in Lake Champlain, after a researcher claims that sonar images show two giant animals beneath the lake.
| 23 | 7 | "America's Most Haunted Ghost Town" | Jerry McNutt | August 17, 2022 | 0.43 |
Marshall along with paranormal investigator and psychic Sierra Cona investigates whether the abandoned mining town of Cerro Gordo is haunted by a vengeful spirit.
| 24 | 8 | "Phoenix Lights" | Jerry McNutt | August 24, 2022 | 0.49 |
Marshall and Sprague investigate the mystery of the Phoenix Lights after recent reports of similar UFO sightings in Central Arizona.

=== Special (2022) ===
| Title | Directed by | Original release date | U.S. viewers (millions) |
|---|---|---|---|
| "Mysteries Decoded Presents: Spirit Squad" | Katie Pyne | October 4, 2022 | 0.18 |
Paranormal investigators Sara Gray and Brittney Crabb along with psychic medium Steffany Strange investigate whether the Leonis Adobe building in Calabasas, California is truly haunted.

== Ratings ==
=== Season 1 ===
Viewership and ratings per episode of Mysteries Decoded
| No. | Title | Air date | Rating (18–49) | Viewers (millions) | DVR (18–49) | DVR viewers (millions) | Total (18–49) | Total viewers (millions) |
|---|---|---|---|---|---|---|---|---|
| 1 | "Roswell" | January 10, 2019 | 0.2 | 0.93 | 0.0 | 0.16 | 0.2 | 1.10 |
| 2 | "Lizzie Borden" | August 13, 2019 | 0.1 | 0.48 | 0.0 | 0.10 | 0.1 | 0.57 |
| 3 | "Mothman" | August 20, 2019 | 0.1 | 0.61 | 0.0 | 0.09 | 0.2 | 0.70 |
| 4 | "The Montauk Experiments" | August 27, 2019 | 0.2 | 0.57 | 0.0 | 0.07 | 0.2 | 0.64 |
| 5 | "Area 51" | September 10, 2019 | 0.1 | 0.54 | 0.0 | 0.09 | 0.1 | 0.63 |
| 6 | "The Bermuda Triangle" | September 17, 2019 | 0.1 | 0.49 | 0.0 | 0.11 | 0.1 | 0.60 |
| 7 | "Witches of Salem" | September 24, 2019 | 0.1 | 0.48 | 0.0 | 0.11 | 0.1 | 0.59 |
| 8 | "Bigfoot" | September 29, 2019 | 0.1 | 0.51 | 0.0 | 0.09 | 0.1 | 0.60 |
| 9 | "Vampires of New Orleans" | October 31, 2019 | 0.1 | 0.59 | 0.0 | 0.07 | 0.1 | 0.66 |

=== Season 1 Updates ===
Viewership and ratings per episode of Mysteries Decoded
| No. | Title | Air date | Rating (18–49) | Viewers (millions) | DVR (18–49) | DVR viewers (millions) | Total (18–49) | Total viewers (millions) |
|---|---|---|---|---|---|---|---|---|
| 1 | "Bigfoot: Revisited" | August 20, 2020 | 0.2 | 0.78 | 0.0 | 0.05 | 0.2 | 0.83 |
| 2 | "Mothman: Revisited" | August 27, 2020 | 0.1 | 0.73 | 0.0 | 0.06 | 0.1 | 0.79 |
| 3 | "Roswell: Revisited" | September 3, 2020 | 0.1 | 0.76 | 0.0 | 0.08 | 0.1 | 0.84 |
| 4 | "Bermuda Triangle: Revisited" | September 10, 2020 | 0.1 | 0.82 | 0.0 | 0.07 | 0.1 | 0.89 |
| 5 | "Area 51: Revisited" | September 17, 2020 | 0.1 | 0.71 | —N/a | —N/a | —N/a | —N/a |
| 6 | "The Montauk Experiments: Revisited" | September 24, 2020 | 0.1 | 0.75 | 0.0 | 0.07 | 0.1 | 0.82 |
| 7 | "Witches of Salem: Revisited" | October 1, 2020 | 0.1 | 0.73 | 0.0 | 0.05 | 0.1 | 0.78 |

=== Season 2 ===
Viewership and ratings per episode of Mysteries Decoded
| No. | Title | Air date | Rating (18–49) | Viewers (millions) |
|---|---|---|---|---|
| 1 | "Curse of the Conjuring House" | July 6, 2022 | 0.0 | 0.50 |
| 2 | "Alien Mountain" | July 13, 2022 | 0.1 | 0.53 |
| 3 | "Werewolves of Kentucky" | July 20, 2022 | 0.1 | 0.52 |
| 4 | "Horror Hotel" | July 27, 2022 | 0.1 | 0.58 |
| 5 | "Sleep Demons" | August 3, 2022 | 0.0 | 0.41 |
| 6 | "Lake Champlain Monster" | August 10, 2022 | 0.0 | 0.43 |
| 7 | "America's Most Haunted Ghost Town" | August 17, 2022 | 0.1 | 0.43 |
| 8 | "Phoenix Lights" | August 24, 2022 | 0.1 | 0.49 |

=== Special ===
Viewership and ratings per episode of Mysteries Decoded
| No. | Title | Air date | Rating (18–49) | Viewers (millions) | DVR (18–49) | DVR viewers (millions) | Total (18–49) | Total viewers (millions) |
|---|---|---|---|---|---|---|---|---|
| 1 | "Mysteries Decoded Presents: Spirit Squad" | October 3, 2022 | 0.0 | 0.18 | 0.0 | 0.01 | 0.0 | 0.19 |
