= Don't (game show) =

2020 American game show

- Genre: Game show
- Presented by: Adam Scott
- Starring: Ryan Reynolds as The Don't Master
- Country of origin: United States
- Original language: English
- No. of seasons: 1
- No. of episodes: 8

Production
- Executive producers: Ryan Reynolds; David Goldberg; Caroline Baumgard; David Hurwitz; Conrad Green; George Dewey; Adam Scott; Scott Larsen
- Production companies: Maximum Effort; Banijay Studios North America

Original release
- Network: ABC
- Release: June 11 – August 13, 2020

Don't is an American comedic physical game show that aired on ABC from June 11 to August 13, 2020. The show was hosted by Adam Scott. Ryan Reynolds served as an executive producer and commentator. The show features teams of four trying to accomplish various tasks to win up to $100,000. In April 2021, the series was canceled after one season.

== Format ==
In each episode, a team of 4 people is invited to participate in 5 rounds, each worth up to $20,000 (with an additional $20,000 available via the use of the Don't Push Button and $5,000 available from a side challenge called the Don't You Dare). Each game's title is in the format of "Don't _____".

Games played all have the word "Don't" preceding them in their name:

- Be Shocked: The team faces an electric shock when answering true or false questions, a correct answer will earn the team $2,000, otherwise the player will be shocked. Then the other player will step up to answer the question. Four shocks end the game.
- Beat Yourself Up: 1 player on the team stands in front of a device with 2 gigantic boxing gloves while the others stand on the other side and answer a series of questions with two possible answers: A or B. Once an answer is chosen, the answer is locked in by pulling the lever of their choice. If the answer is correct the team wins $4,000. If the answer is incorrect the receiver will be punched in the face and no money is awarded. 3 incorrect answers will end the game.
- Blink: The team starts the round with a bank of $20,000 and tasked to not blink their eyes for one minute. For each time a member of the team blinks $500 is deducted from the bank. At the end of the time, however much money remains in the bank is awarded to the team.
- Budge: One member of the team stands behind a clear plexiglas shield while wearing a helmet with several pins on it. Above the player will be 3 balloons that they must try to avoid popping while the host fires items from a slingshot at them. If they stand still and avoid popping any of the balloons, the team banks $4,000 for each item, with a maximum $20,000 for surviving all 5 rounds. Any balloon popped awards no money for the round and the game ends if all 3 are popped.
- Drink: One member of the participating team must walk on a slow moving treadmill with a heat lamp pointed at them. While walking, the contestant must eat 5 peppers beginning with the least spiciest pepper and finishing with the hottest spicy pepper, according to their measurement on the Scoville Scale. After each pepper is eaten, the host then offers the participating contestant a drink, such as ice water, milk or lemonade. If the contestant refuses the drink, the team wins $4,000. If the player refuses all 5 drinks after eating all 5 peppers, the team wins the maximum $20,000. If the contestant takes the drink, no money is earned for that round.
- Embarrass Yourself: One member of the team is suspended in the air wearing a pair of over-sized pants while positioned over a pool of water, while the other 3 members answer multiple-choice trivia questions. $5,000 is awarded for a correct answer to each question. However, one button from the "pants" will pop off and is removed for an incorrect answer. If at anytime the team gives 3 wrong answers, the game is over and the player in the air is dropped into the pool below, basically wetting their pants.
- Get Clocked: 2 players sit in bins underneath "hammers" on a gigantic clock with a rotating face while the other 2 are asked a series of questions for which the answer is a number on the clock. For each answer, one of the players in the bins must reach up and attempt to grab the number representative of the answer while avoiding being hit by the hammers. If the player succeeds in grabbing the number or knocks it off of the clock face, they receive $1,500 for the team. If they get hit by the hammer and knocked down, they are out of the game. The game ends when the team gets all 12 numbers off the clock and earns the maximum $20,000 prize, the 5 minute time limit elapses or both players on the clock are knocked out.
- Get Tired: 1 team member will be tasked to stand below a 4-lane ramp where giant tires are placed at the top. Each lane is labeled A, B, C, and D. The three other team members are asked a question with four choices, one for each lane and only one correct answer. Once the team answers, the other player moves to stand in the lane of their answer. On Adam's command a smoke screen deploys and hides all four tires, then the tires represented by the wrong answers are released. If the responder is in the correct lane, the tires will miss them and the team earns $5,000. If they are in the wrong lane, they will be "run over" by the tire and no money is earned.
- Leave Me Hanging: In this game, 2 team members will be suspended in the air at a great height, and the two members are placed in the opposite direction (one team member is upside down while the other is downside up). The two team members will try the hardest to not let go for a minute. For each 15 seconds that the team members are still hanging, $5,000 is added to the bank. If one team member lets go, the game ends and no money is earned.
- Look Back: In this game, each member of the team will stand at the bottom of a ramp with their legs bound together at the ankles. Their objective is to hop down the lane and break a series of ribbons with values starting at $1,000 and increasing in increments of $1,000 going all the way to $5,000 while avoiding being mowed down by a giant red ball sent down the ramp. The last barrier broken before the player is hit by the ball is awarded to the team, meaning that if all 4 players can break the $5,000 line they earn the maximum $20,000 prize.
- Lose Your Grip: In this game, the team has 10 seconds to win a game of tug of war by pulling a strongman off of his pedestal. If only one member of the team can succeed at the task, the team wins $20,000. However, for each member of the team added to the task on successive attempts, the prize drops by $5,000.
- Make Me Turn This Car Around: In this game the team will run an obstacle course that will test their teamwork, coordination and timing to get through it while wearing a costume meant to resemble a van. If the team can successfully complete the course within 60 seconds or less, the team earns the maximum $20,000. If it takes the team more than 60 seconds to complete the course then $1,000 is deducted for every 10 additional seconds.
- Miss: The team must shoot several basketballs into a basketball hoop, but there's a catch: they have to tackle an obstacle course that involves a spinning wheel and a treadmill. For 20 seconds, the team must quickly get past the obstacles and shoot the basketballs into the hoop. Each ball that gets into the hoop is $1,000. No money is added if a team member misses the hoop.
- Miss a Beat: 1 player will be dancing on a turntable while the other players guess the dance move the player is dancing to. Each correct answer is $2,000, with a maximum $20,000 on the line.
- Play Ball in the House: 2 players from the team play this game, one suspended upside down from a harness and swinging back & forth in front of a house setup. The other player pitches balls to the suspended player while on a spinning platform which the hanging player must catch in their mitt. For each ball they catch, $1,000 is banked for the team, with a maximum $20,000 on the line. If the other player misses and/or breaks something, no money is earned.
- Play with Matches: In this game, one player will fire "fireballs" from a slingshot at 6 "fires" that must be extinguished within 2 minutes in order to win. The trick is that the player must fire past 3 oversized "matches" that are defending the area. Each successful "fire" extinguished is worth $3,000 and taking down all 6 wins $20,000.
- Stop: The team faces 4 ramps with a Stop sign at the top of each. The team chooses 1 player to be the "Runner" and is asked a trivia question with multiple choices and only one correct answer (four choices for Question 1, three for Question 2 and only two for Question 3). Upon choosing an answer, the Runner runs up the ramp at the sign with the purpose of crashing through it safely. A correct response earns the team $5,000 for the first two questions and $10,000 for the third question. An incorrect answer results in the Runner hitting a barrier and no money awarded.
- Talk to Strangers: In this game, 1 player is blindfolded while the 3 other team members are put next to each other by a look-alike. $5,000 is awarded if the blinded member can correctly guess the family member. $20,000 is awarded if the blinded member can correctly guess all three team members.
- Use Fowl Language: The contestants, in an order determined by the team, are shown a picture of a celebrity. The contestant must determine the name of the celebrity, and if there is a bird in the name of the celebrity. If the contestant believes there is the name of a bird in the name of the celebrity, they must touch the fake bird egg and say the name of the celebrity. If they do not believe there is a bird name in the name of the celebrity, however, they must state the celebrity's name without touching the egg. If the contestant is correct and there is a bird name in the name of the celebrity, the team wins $2,500; if the contestant is correct and there is no bird name in the name of the celebrity, the team wins $1,000.

Beginning with the second game, the team may decide to press the Don't Push Button before any of the following games. If the button is pushed and the game is played perfectly, the $20,000 that could be earned from the game is doubled to $40,000. However, if the full amount of money is not won, whatever the team wins from the game is halved.

== Don't You Dare ==
At some point in the show, there is also a side challenge called Don't You Dare, which can either be played by the remaining team members or can increase the difficulty level of a game. Completing or accepting this challenge will earn the team an additional $5,000 regardless of the result of the main game.

- In the premiere episode, the challenge was presented during "Don't Drink". In the challenge, the remaining three team members were offered a chip with wasabi on it to eat. All three members ate the chip and wasabi and the team received $5,000.
- In Episode 2, the challenge was presented during "Don't Play with Matches" by adding a fourth "match" onto the playing field, making the objective more difficult. The team accepted the Dare and $5,000 was awarded to the team.
- In Episode 3, the challenge was presented during "Don't Be Shocked" by doubling the voltage. The team accepted the Dare and $5,000 was awarded to the team.
- In Episode 4, the challenge was presented during "Don't Drink". In the challenge, the remaining three team members were offered a jalapeno with hotdogs buns on it to eat. All three members ate the jalapeno and $5,000 was awarded to the team.
- In Episode 6, the challenge was presented during "Don't Blink". In the challenge, one member tried not to blink for an additional 10 seconds, while a strobing light was shined in their eyes. Completion of the challenge awarded the team $5,000 but if the player blinked EVEN ONCE, the money was lost. The player accepted & successfully completed the challenge, earning an additional $5,000.
- In Episode 7, the challenge was presented during "Don't Miss a Beat". In the challenge, the turntable increased by 50%. The players accepted the dare, and $5,000 was awarded to the team.
- In Episode 8, the challenge was presented during "Don't Play with Matches" by adding a fourth "match" onto the playing field, making the objective more difficult. The team accepted the Dare and $5,000 was awarded to the team.

The maximum possible winnings for a team for all 5 games played perfectly, the Don't Push button being used, and the Don't You Dare side challenge completed, is $125,000.

== Episodes ==
No.	Title	Original release date	Prod. code	U.S. viewers (millions)
1	"Don't Be a Wiseguy"	June 11, 2020	101	4.18
2	"Don't Move in With Your Parents"	June 18, 2020	103	3.36
3	"Don't Parent Trap on National TV"	June 25, 2020	107	3.42
4	"Don't Go Chasing Cedar Rapids"	July 9, 2020	106	3.24
5	"Don't Hit Your Sister"	July 16, 2020	104	2.62
6	"Don't Meet Your Heroes"	July 30, 2020	105	2.29
7	"Don't Try This At Home"	August 6, 2020	102	2.43
8	"Don't Quit Your Day Job"	August 13, 2020	108	2.49

== International versions ==
Country	Name	Host	Narrator	TV station	Premiere	Finale
Mexico	Don't: No Lo Hagas	Adal Ramones	El Capi Pérez	Azteca Uno	September 21, 2020	October 9, 2020
Philippines	Bawal Na Game Show	Paolo Ballesteros and Wally Bayola	Ramcy Tirona	TV5	August 15, 2020	March 30, 2021
