= The Christmas Caroler Challenge =

American talent competition series

- Genre: Competition; Reality television
- Presented by: Dean Cain; Laura McKenzie
- Judges: Mikalah Gordon; Brandon Rogers; Garry Gary Beers
- Country of origin: United States
- Original language: English
- No. of seasons: 2
- No. of episodes: 12

Production
- Producers: Noah Matthews; Michael Bouson
- Running time: 42–44 minutes
- Production company: Associated Television International

Original release
- Network: The CW
- Release: December 15, 2019 – December 25, 2020

The Christmas Caroler Challenge is an American reality television competition that premiered on The CW on December 15, 2019. The series is traditionally scheduled in a double-run of two hour-long episodes, all airing in December annually as a part of the CW's holiday programming lineup. On October 19, 2020, it was announced that the series would be returning for a second season, which premiered on December 11, 2020. In the second season, The Sugarplums were crowned the winners.

== Premise ==
The series features 10-12 Christmas carol groups, each with their own stylized brand of performance, facing off to win a grand prize of; a trophy, 1,000 toys to be donated to Marine Toys for tots in the name of the winning caroling group and an opportunity to appear and perform at the Annual Hollywood Christmas Parade.

== Episodes ==
Season	Episodes	Originally released	
Season	Episodes	First released	Last released
1	6	December 15, 2019	December 23, 2019
2	6	December 11, 2020	December 25, 2020

=== Season 1 (2019) ===
No. overall	No. in season	Title	Original release date	Prod. code	U.S. viewers (millions)
1	1	"The Auditions Part 1"	December 15, 2019	101	0.53
2	2	"The Auditions Part 2"	December 15, 2019	102	0.44
3	3	"The Top Ten"	December 22, 2019	103	0.47
4	4	"The Top Eight"	December 22, 2019	104	0.45
5	5	"The Six Semifinalists"	December 23, 2019	105	0.57
6	6	"The Finals"	December 23, 2019	106	0.54

=== Season 2 (2020) ===
No. overall	No. in season	Title	Original release date	Prod. code	U.S. viewers (millions)
7	1	"The Ten Contenders of 2020"	December 11, 2020	201	0.49
8	2	"The Ten Contenders of 2020"	December 11, 2020	202	0.49
9	3	"Four to the Finals"	December 18, 2020	203	0.47
10	4	"Four to the Finals"	December 18, 2020	204	0.47
11	5	"The Finals"	December 25, 2020	205	0.45
12	6	"The Finals"	December 25, 2020	206	0.45
