= Reuben de Maid =

Welsh singer, beauty influencer, and TV personality

- Born: March 2005 (age 21); Cardiff, Wales
- Known for: Fashion influencer

Reuben de Maid (born 24 March 2005) is a Welsh makeup artist and singer.

== Biography ==
De Maid was born in Cardiff, Wales to Vicki and Mathew in March 2005. He has a younger brother Sonny, and a younger sister, Coco. When he was younger, he dreamed of being a professional footballer. His mother encouraged him to begin his social media career on Instagram.

In 2017, Reuben de Maid made his first public appearance on The Ellen DeGeneres Show at 12 years old. While on the show, he met Kim Kardashian. The two later appeared in a video together that obtained over 8 million views, and he made an appearance on the reality series, Keeping Up with the Kardashians. He also appeared on the youth talent series, Little Big Shots.

By April 2019, his YouTube channel had over 100,000 subscribers, and roughly 200,000 on Instagram. By July that same year, those numbers exceeded 225,000 subscribers and 319,000 followers, respectively, and his received his first makeup brand ambassadorship with W7 Cosmetics. In 2020, he and his family were invited to star in a CW docu-series titled, Being Reuben, when he was 14 years old.
