= List of 2019 American television debuts =

These American television shows premiered or were scheduled to premiere in 2019.

First aired	Title	Channel	Source
January 1	Pinky Malinky	Netflix	
January 1	Windy City Rehab	HGTV	
January 1	365 Days of Love	Facebook Watch	
January 2	The Masked Singer	Fox	
January 2	MythBusters Jr.	Science Channel	
January 3	The Titan Games	NBC	
January 3	Surviving R. Kelly	Lifetime	
January 5	Tails of Valor	CBS	
January 5	Transformers: Rescue Bots Academy	Discovery Family	
January 7	America's Got Talent: The Champions	NBC	
January 7	Cartel Crew	VH1	
January 8	Good Trouble	Freeform	
January 8	Project Blue Book	History	
January 8	Lindsay Lohan's Beach Club	MTV	
January 9	Schooled	ABC	
January 10	Fam	CBS	
January 11	Hanging with the Hendersons	Animal Planet	
January 13	Tigtone	Adult Swim	
January 13	La Voz	Telemundo	
January 13	Mormon Love	Facebook Watch	
January 14	The Passage	Fox	
January 15	Roswell, New Mexico	The CW	
January 16	Deadly Class	Syfy	
January 16	Wayne	YouTube Premium	
January 17	Backyard Envy	Bravo	
January 18	Carmen Sandiego	Netflix	
January 18	Gigantosaurus	Disney Channel/Disney Jr.	
January 20	Black Monday	Showtime	
January 21	Dating: No Filter	E!	
January 22	9 Months with Courtney Cox	Facebook Watch	
January 24	The Other Two	Comedy Central	
January 25	Sydney to the Max	Disney Channel	
January 26	The Ready Room	CBS All Access	
January 27	Rainbow Butterfly Unicorn Kitty	Nickelodeon/Nicktoons	
January 28	Care Bears: Unlock the Magic	Boomerang	
January 29	Now or Never	ESPN2	
January 29	Ahora o Nunca	ESPN Deportes	
February 1	Russian Doll	Netflix	
February 3	The World's Best	CBS	
February 3	Hanna	Amazon Video	
February 5	American Soul	BET	
February 6	Betty en NY	NBC	
February 8	PEN15	Hulu	
February 12	Boomerang	BET	
February 12	Miracle Workers	TBS	
February 13	Weird City	YouTube Premium	
February 13	Paranormal Caught on Camera	Travel Channel	
February 14	Dating Around	Netflix	
February 15	The Umbrella Academy	Netflix	
February 15	Proven Innocent	Fox	
February 15	Doom Patrol	DC Universe	
February 20	Outside Your Bubble	Facebook Watch	
February 21	Desus & Mero	Showtime	
February 24	Whiskey Cavalier	ABC	
February 25	The Enemy Within	NBC	
February 25	Vice Live	Viceland	
February 26	Mexican Dynasties	Bravo	
February 27	Alien News Desk	Syfy	
February 27	Will Smith's Bucket List	Facebook Watch	
March 2	Power Rangers Beast Morphers	Nickelodeon	
March 7	The Order	Netflix	
March 8	DC Super Hero Girls	Cartoon Network	
March 8	Costume Quest	Amazon Video	
March 10	Now Apocalypse	Starz	
March 10	Buddy vs. Duff	Food Network	
March 12	Videos After Dark	ABC	
March 15	Shrill	Hulu	
March 15	Turn Up Charlie	Netflix	
March 15	Love, Death & Robots	Netflix	
March 18	The Fix	ABC	
March 18	The D.L. Hughley Show	TV One	
March 18	Show Offs	BYUtv	
March 18	Dwight In Shining Armor	BYUtv	
March 19	The Village	NBC	
March 19	Mental Samurai	Fox	
March 19	One of a Kind	HGTV	
March 20	Pretty Little Liars: The Perfectionists	Freeform	
March 20	Battle of the Ages	BYUtv	
March 20	Dinner Takes All	BYUtv	
March 27	Million Dollar Mile	CBS	
March 27	What We Do in the Shadows	FX	
March 28	Abby's	NBC	
March 28	Tacoma FD	truTV	
March 30	Victor and Valentino	Cartoon Network	
April 1	Ultraman	Netflix	
April 1	The Substitute	Nickelodeon	
April 1	Hostile Planet	National Geographic	
April 2	Growing Up Chrisley	USA Network	
April 4	In the Dark	The CW	
April 5	Warrior	Cinemax	
April 7	Collector's Call	MeTV	
April 7	Lazor Wulf	Adult Swim	
April 9	The Code	CBS	
April 11	Black Summer	Netflix	
April 12	Huge in France	Netflix	
April 12	Special	Netflix	
April 13	Chasing Life With Dr. Sanjay Gupta	CNN	
April 14	Bake You Rich	Food Network	
April 15	Duff Takes the Cake	Food Network	
April 15	No Good Nick	Netflix	
April 16	Bless This Mess	ABC	
April 19	Ramy	Hulu	
April 19	Ryan's Mystery Playdate	Nickelodeon	
April 19	The New Negroes with Baron Vaughn and Open Mike Eagle	Comedy Central	
April 21	Jeremy Wade's Dark Waters	Animal Planet	
April 21	Fish or Die	Animal Planet	
April 22	Live Rescue	A&E	
April 22	The Brigade: Race to the Hudson	Outdoor Channel	
April 23	Games People Play	BET	
April 23	1969	ABC	
April 23	I Think You Should Leave with Tim Robinson	Netflix	
April 24	Bonding	Netflix	
April 24	Skyscrapers: Engineering the Future	Science Channel	
April 26	Chambers	Netflix	
April 26	Street Food	Netflix	
April 26	Portals to Hell	Travel Channel	
April 28	The Red Line	CBS	
April 28	The Redemption Project with Van Jones	CNN	
April 30	On Tour with Asperger's Are Us	HBO	
April 30	Kids Behind Bars: Life or Parole	A&E	
May 3	Tuca & Bertie	Netflix	
May 3	Dead to Me	Netflix	
May 6	Kevin Hart's Laugh Out Loud	Bounce TV	
May 6	State of the Union	Sundance TV	
May 7	Texicanas	Bravo	
May 8	The Employables	A&E	
May 9	Klepper	Comedy Central	
May 10	The Society	Netflix	
May 10	Jailbirds	Netflix	
May 10	Wu-Tang Clan: Of Mics and Men	Showtime	
May 13	L.A.'s Finest	Spectrum Originals	
May 13	Say Yes to the Nest	HGTV	
May 17	Nature's Strangest Mysteries: Solved	Animal Planet	
May 19	The Aquarium	Animal Planet	
May 20	Private Lives of the Monarchs	Smithsonian Channel	
May 21	Blood & Treasure	CBS	
May 22	The Wrestlers	Viceland	
May 23	Christina on the Coast	HGTV	
May 24	What/If	Netflix	
May 27	Historical Roasts	Netflix	
May 27	The Hot Zone	National Geographic	
May 27	Still A Mystery	Investigation Discovery	
May 27	Murder Loves Company	Investigation Discovery	
May 27	Dirty Mudder Truckers	Discovery Channel	
May 28	Guardians of the Glades	Discovery Channel	
May 28	Songland	NBC	
May 29	The InBetween	NBC	
May 29	Property Brothers: Forever Home	HGTV	
May 31	Swamp Thing	DC Universe	
June 1	To Have & To Hold: Charlotte	Oprah Winfrey Network	
June 1	Death at the Mansion: Rebecca Zahau	Oxygen	
June 1	My House is Your House	HGTV	
June 2	Perpetual Grace, LTD	Epix	
June 2	American Princess	Lifetime	
June 2	NOS4A2	AMC	
June 2	The Weekly	FX	
June 2	Relatively Nat & Liv	E!	
June 2	Marriage Rescue	Paramount Network	
June 2	Raising Wild	Discovery Channel	
June 2	Truth Behind the Moon Landing	Science Channel	
June 3	Malibu Rescue	Netflix	
June 3	90 Day Fiancé: The Other Way	TLC	
June 5	Lone Star Justice	Investigation Discovery	
June 5	Russia's Wild Sea	Smithsonian Channel	
June 6	Unspouse My House	HGTV	
June 6	Hero Ink	A&E	
June 6	Ms. T's Music Factory	Lifetime	
June 7	The Big Stage	The CW	
June 7	The Chef Show	Netflix	
June 9	Legends of the Deep	Science Channel	
June 9	Sugar and Toys	Fuse	
June 9	sMothered	TLC	
June 10	Kate Plus Date	TLC	
June 10	Best Ever Trivia Show	Game Show Network	
June 10	RuPaul	First-run syndication	
June 11	Cheerleader Generation	Lifetime	
June 11	Jasper & Errol's First Time	Viceland	
June 12	First Responders Live	Fox	
June 12	Alien Highway	Travel Channel	
June 14	Trinkets	Netflix	
June 14	Just Roll with It	Disney Channel	
June 14	Awake: The Million Dollar Game	Netflix	
June 14	T.O.T.S.	Disney Jr.	
June 14	Jett	Cinemax	
June 14	Love After Lockup: Life After Lockup	WE tv	
June 14	Savage Builds	Discovery Channel	
June 14	Los Espookys	HBO	
June 15	Murder and Justice: The Case of Martha Moxley	Oxygen	
June 16	Euphoria	HBO	
June 16	City on a Hill	Showtime	
June 16	Apollo's Moon Shot	Smithsonian Channel	
June 16	Atomic Age Declassified	Smithsonian Channel	
June 17	Grand Hotel	ABC	
June 17	Amphibia	Disney Channel	
June 18	Alternatino with Arturo Castro	Comedy Central	
June 18	Ambitions	Oprah Winfrey Network	
June 20	Family Food Fight	ABC	
June 20	Holey Moley	ABC	
June 20	Reef Break	ABC	
June 20	Spin the Wheel	Fox	
June 20	City vs. Burbs	HGTV	
June 21	Mr. Iglesias	Netflix	
June 21	Ghosts of Morgan City	Travel Channel	
June 21	The Bravest Knight	Hulu	
June 22	Lego City Adventures	Nickelodeon	
June 23	License to Kill	Oxygen	
June 23	A Lie to Die For	Oxygen	
June 27	Scooby-Doo and Guess Who?	Boomerang	
June 30	What Just Happened??! with Fred Savage	Fox	
July 1	Mao Mao: Heroes of Pure Heart	Cartoon Network	
July 1	Cupcake Championship	Food Network	
July 6	Supersize My Pool	HGTV	
July 6	Pool Hunters	HGTV	
July 6	Pool Kings	HGTV	
July 6	Best. Pool. Ever.	HGTV	
July 6	The Polos	Discovery Family	
July 7	The Movies	CNN	
July 7	SJ Sharkie	NHL.TV	
July 9	Bring the Funny	NBC	
July 9	Love Island	CBS	
July 9	Til Death Do Us Part	Investigation Discovery	
July 9	The Next Big Thing	BET	
July 10	Florida Girls	Pop	
July 10	Marrying Millions	Lifetime	
July 10	The Strongest Man in History	History	
July 11	Killer Affair	Oxygen	
July 12	Fastest Cars in the Dirty South	Motor Trend	
July 13	Injustice with Nancy Grace	Oxygen	
July 14	Impact of Murder	Investigation Discovery	
July 14	If We Built It Today	Science Channel	
July 15	Molly of Denali	PBS Kids	
July 15	Girls Cruise	VH1	
July 15	Aaron Needs a Job	Discovery Channel	
July 15	Peyton's Places	ESPN+	
July 16	Human Discoveries	Facebook Watch	
July 16	Pandora	The CW	
July 17	Pearson	USA Network	
July 17	Almost Ready	YouTube Premium	
July 19	Knights of the Zodiac: Saint Seiya	Netflix	
July 19	The Unxplained	History	
July 20	Where's Waldo?	Universal Kids	
July 21	Gordon Ramsay: Uncharted	National Geographic	
July 22	The Family Chantel	TLC	
July 22	Serial Killer: Devil Unchained	Investigation Discovery	
July 23	Cash Pad	CNBC	
July 24	South Side	Comedy Central	
July 24	The Last Cowboy	Paramount Network	
July 25	Another Life	Netflix	
July 26	The Boys	Amazon Video	
July 27	Norman Picklestripes	Universal Kids	
July 28	Pennyworth	Epix	
July 28	Amazing Dogs	Smithsonian Channel	
July 28	Delicious Miss Brown	Food Network	
July 29	Twelve Forever	Netflix	
July 29	Lights Out with David Spade	Comedy Central	
July 29	Love & Listings	VH1	
July 31	Sherman's Showcase	IFC	
August 1	No One Saw a Thing	Sundance TV	
August 1	BBQ Brawl: Flay v. Symon	Food Network	
August 1	Going for Sold	HGTV	
August 2	A Black Lady Sketch Show	HBO	
August 2	This Is Football	Amazon Video	
August 2	Racing Wives	CMT	
August 4	Flip It Like Disick	E!	
August 4	Serengeti	Discovery Channel	
August 5	Mystic Britain	Smithsonian Channel	
August 5	Infinity Train	Cartoon Network	
August 6	Flipping Exes	Bravo	
August 6	Code of the Wild	Travel Channel	
August 6	Undercover Billionaire	Discovery Channel	
August 7	Contact	Discovery Channel	
August 7	BH90210	Fox	
August 7	Monster Ships	Science Channel	
August 7	Hypnotize Me	The CW	
August 8	Two Sentence Horror Stories	The CW	
August 8	Chasing The Cure	TNT	
August 8	Wu Assassins	Netflix	
August 9	Free Meek	Amazon Video	
August 9	Masters of Disaster	Discovery Channel	
August 10	Mountain Mamas	HGTV	
August 10	The Zoo: San Diego	Animal Planet	
August 11	Curse of Akakor	Facebook Watch	
August 11	Strange World	Travel Channel	
August 12	Straight Up Steve Austin	USA Network	
August 13	Mysteries Decoded	The CW	
August 13	Supermarket Stakeout	Food Network	
August 13	Tiffany Haddish Presents: They Ready	Netflix	
August 14	David Makes Man	Oprah Winfrey Network	
August 14	Dani's House	Viceland	
August 14	Black Ink Crew: Compton	VH1	
August 15	Why Women Kill	CBS All Access	
August 15	Cannon Busters	Netflix	
August 16	Diagnosis	Netflix	
August 16	Ghost Brothers: Haunted Houseguests	Travel Channel	
August 18	The Righteous Gemstones	HBO	
August 18	Mind of a Monster	Investigation Discovery	
August 19	Family Restaurant Rivals	Food Network	
August 20	Big, Small & Deadly	Animal Planet	
August 21	Hyperdrive	Netflix	
August 22	The Flay List	Food Network	
August 24	OWN Spotlight: Black Women OWN the Conversation	Oprah Winfrey Network	
August 25	Killer Motive	Oxygen	
August 25	On Becoming a God in Central Florida	Showtime	
August 26	Pup Academy	Disney Channel	
August 27	Stay or Sell	HGTV	
August 27	The Devil You Know	Viceland	
August 28	The Murder Tapes	Investigation Discovery	
August 29	Growing Up Hip Hop: New York	WE tv	
August 30	Carnival Row	Amazon Video	
August 30	When Hope Calls	Hallmark Movies Now	
August 30	The Dark Crystal: Age of Resistance	Netflix	
August 30	Styling Hollywood	Netflix	
September 2	Middle School Moguls	Nickelodeon	
September 2	Dog: Impossible	Nat Geo Wild	
September 3	Valley of the Damned	Investigation Discovery	
September 4	Dog's Most Wanted	WGN America	
September 4	Wu-Tang: An American Saga	Hulu	
September 5	Secret Nazi Ruins	Science Channel	
September 6	Good Talk with Anthony Jeselnik	Comedy Central	
September 6	Couples Therapy	Showtime	
September 6	Archibald's Next Big Thing	Netflix	
September 8	The Day I Picked My Parents	A&E	
September 9	Tamron Hall	First-run syndication	
September 9	The Kelly Clarkson Show	First-run syndication	
September 9	Judge Jerry	First-run syndication	
September 9	All Access	First-run syndication	
September 9	A Very Brady Renovation	HGTV	
September 9	Bluey	Disney Jr.	
September 10	MTV's Ghosted: Love Gone Missing	MTV	
September 11	NFL: The Grind	Epix	
September 11	The Fixers	BYUtv	
September 11	Making Good	BYUtv	
September 12	The Mind, Explained	Netflix	
September 13	Red Bull Peaking	The CW	
September 13	Undone	Amazon Video	
September 13	Murder in the Bayou	Showtime	
September 16	The Mel Robbins Show	First-run syndication	
September 16	A Little Late with Lilly Singh	NBC	
September 16	25 Words or Less	First-run syndication	
September 16	Personal Injury Court	First-run syndication	
September 17	The Last Kids on Earth	Netflix	
September 19	The Parent Trip	BYUtv	
September 19	First Wives Club	BET+	
September 19	Bigger	BET+	
September 21	Power Players	Cartoon Network	
September 22	Hunt for Eagle 56	Smithsonian Channel	
September 23	Bluff City Law	NBC	
September 23	Bob Hearts Abishola	CBS	
September 23	All Rise	CBS	
September 23	Prodigal Son	Fox	
September 23	Team Kaylie	Netflix	
September 23	Halloween Cake-Off	Food Network	
September 24	Mixed-ish	ABC	
September 24	Emergence	ABC	
September 25	Stumptown	ABC	
September 25	Cake	FXX	
September 26	The Unicorn	CBS	
September 26	Carol's Second Act	CBS	
September 26	Evil	CBS	
September 26	Perfect Harmony	NBC	
September 26	Sunnyside	NBC	
September 26	Creepshow	Shudder	
September 26	Untold Stories of Hip Hop	WE tv	
September 27	The Politician	Netflix	
September 27	DreamWorks Dragons: Rescue Riders	Netflix	
September 28	Shook	Disney Channel	
September 28	Mission Unstoppable	CBS	
September 29	Godfather of Harlem	Epix	
September 29	Bless the Harts	Fox	
October 1	Most Terrifying Places	Travel Channel	
October 1	Ink Master: Grudge Match	Paramount Network	
October 1	In a Man's World	Bravo	
October 2	All Elite Wrestling: Dynamite	TNT	
October 2	Almost Family	Fox	
October 2	Living Undocumented	Netflix	
October 3	The Holzer Files	Travel Channel	
October 3	Seis Manos	Netflix	
October 4	Raising Dion	Netflix	
October 4	Freakshow Cakes	Cooking Channel	
October 4	Relentless with Kate Snow	Oxygen	
October 6	Batwoman	The CW	
October 6	River of No Return	Discovery Channel	
October 7	Primal	Adult Swim	
October 7	My Horror Story	Travel Channel	
October 8	Glad You Asked	YouTube Premium	
October 9	Nancy Drew	The CW	
October 9	Rhythm + Flow	Netflix	
October 10	Ant Anstead Master Mechanic	Motor Trend	
October 10	You're Not a Monster	IMDb TV	
October 11	The Birch	Facebook Watch	
October 11	Ghost Nation	Travel Channel	
October 11	Gabby Duran & the Unsittables	Disney Channel	
October 12	The DNA of Murder with Paul Holes	Oxygen	
October 13	Why We Hate	Discovery Channel	
October 13	Rise of the Supercarrier	Smithsonian Channel	
October 13	Hip Hop: The Songs That Shook America	AMC	
October 14	The Casagrandes	Nickelodeon	
October 15	Treadstone	USA Network	
October 15	Battle of the Fittest Couples	Paramount Network	
October 16	Limetown	Facebook Watch	
October 17	Going from Broke	Sony Crackle	
October 17	BookTube	YouTube Premium	
October 17	Underground Marvels	Science Channel	
October 18	Modern Love	Amazon Video	
October 18	Living With Yourself	Netflix	
October 18	Unnatural Selection	Netflix	
October 20	Leavenworth	Starz	
October 20	Watchmen	HBO	
October 20	Lost Cities with Albert Lin	National Geographic	
October 21	Could You Survive the Movies?	YouTube Premium	
October 21	Rock the Block	HGTV	
October 22	Fixer to Fabulous	HGTV	
October 22	The Misery Index	TBS	
October 22	Truth About Murder with Sunny Hostin	Investigation Discovery	
October 23	The Oval	BET	
October 23	Sistas	BET	
October 23	CopWatch America	BET	
October 23	Breakfast, Lunch & Dinner	Netflix	
October 24	Daybreak	Netflix	
October 25	Prank Encounters	Netflix	
October 26	Destination Fear	Travel Channel	
October 27	Killer Siblings	Oxygen	
November 1	The Morning Show	Apple TV+	
November 1	For All Mankind	Apple TV+	
November 1	Dickinson	Apple TV+	
November 1	Snoopy in Space	Apple TV+	
November 1	Helpsters	Apple TV+	
November 1	See	Apple TV+	
November 1	Oprah's Book Club	Apple TV+	
November 1	America's Most Musical Family	Nickelodeon	
November 1	Nashville Squares	CMT	
November 1	Hello Ninja	Netflix	
November 1	Vice Investigates	Hulu	
November 3	Hot Properties: San Diego	HGTV	
November 4	Bitchin' Boot Camp	Motor Trend	
November 5	Famously Afraid	Travel Channel	
November 5	Welcome to Plathville	TLC	
November 6	Back in the Game	CNBC	
November 7	The Impeachment Show	Viceland	
November 8	Green Eggs and Ham	Netflix	
November 8	The Rocketeer	Disney Jr.	
November 8	High School Musical: The Musical: The Series	Disney+	
November 9	Blue Planet Now	BBC America	
November 9	Sea of Shadows	National Geographic	
November 10	Lost Secrets	Travel Channel	
November 10	Unexplained and Unexplored	Science Channel	
November 11	Xavier Riddle and the Secret Museum	PBS Kids	
November 12	The Mandalorian	Disney+	
November 12	The World According to Jeff Goldblum	Disney+	
November 12	Encore!	Disney+	
November 12	Marvel's Hero Project	Disney+	
November 12	SparkShorts	Disney+	
November 12	Disney Family Sundays	Disney+	
November 12	Forky Asks a Question	Disney+	
November 12	Pixar in Real Life	Disney+	
November 12	Kings of Pain	History	
November 13	Maradona in Mexico	Netflix	
November 13	Christmas Cookie Matchup	Hallmark Drama	
November 15	Dollface	Hulu	
November 15	Caught on Camera: The Untold Stories	Investigation Discovery GO	
November 16	Highway To Hell	Investigation Discovery	
November 17	Unpolished	TLC	
November 18	Hometown Horror	Travel Channel	
November 19	VH1: UnVeiled	VH1	
November 22	Dolly Parton's Heartstrings	Netflix	
November 22	Dino Girl Gauko	Netflix	
November 22	Narcoworld: Dope Stories	Netflix	
November 22	Singapore Social	Netflix	
November 25	Wrap Battle	Freeform	
November 25	The Impossible Row	Discovery Channel/DiscoveryGO	
November 27	Broken	Netflix	
November 28	Servant	Apple TV+	
November 28	Santa's Baking Blizzard	Food Network	
November 28	Merry Happy Whatever	Netflix	
November 29	The Movies That Made Us	Netflix	
November 29	Harley Quinn	DC Universe	
November 29	Top Elf	Nickelodeon	
December 1	Holiday Wars	Food Network	
December 2	Retro Tech	YouTube Premium	
December 4	Man vs. Bear	Discovery Channel	
December 4	Five Day Biz Fix	CNBC	
December 4	The Moodys	Fox	
December 5	Court Cam	A&E	
December 5	The Interrogator	Investigation Discovery	
December 5	An Unexpected Killer	Oxygen	
December 5	V Wars	Netflix	
December 6	Virgin River	Netflix	
December 6	The Confession Killer	Netflix	
December 6	Astronomy Club: The Sketch Show	Netflix	
December 6	One Day at Disney Shorts	Disney+	
December 6	Reprisal	Hulu	
December 6	Truth Be Told	Apple TV+	
December 8	The L Word: Generation Q	Showtime	
December 8	Work in Progress	Showtime	
December 8	Friends Speak	Reelz	
December 8	Expedition Bigfoot	Travel Channel	
December 10	Ellen's Greatest Night of Giveaways	NBC	
December 15	The Christmas Caroler Challenge	The CW	
December 18	The Age Of A.I.	YouTube Premium	
December 18	Soundtrack	Netflix	
December 18	Don't F**k With Cats: Hunting an Internet Killer	Netflix	
December 20	The Witcher	Netflix	
December 20	Trending Fear	Travel Channel	
December 20	The Adventures of Paddington	Nickelodeon	
December 20	Pick of the Litter	Disney+	
December 21	Looking for Leia	Syfy	
December 24	Generation Renovation	HGTV	
December 26	Fast & Furious: Spy Racers	Netflix	
December 27	Kevin Hart: Don't F**k This Up	Netflix	
December 29	Flirty Dancing	Fox	
December 29	Dare Me	USA Network	
December 29	Lost in the Wild	Travel Channel	

== Miniseries ==
First aired	Title	Channel	Source
January 13	Valley of the Boom	National Geographic	
January 27	I Am the Night	TNT	
February 15	Fast Layne	Disney Channel	
March 20	The Act	Hulu	
April 1	Gēmusetto Machu Picchu	Adult Swim	
April 9	Fosse/Verdon	FX	
April 22	Gentleman Jack	HBO	
May 5	The Spanish Princess	Starz	
May 6	Chernobyl	HBO	
May 17	Catch-22	Hulu	
May 31	When They See Us	Netflix	
June 7	Armistead Maupin's Tales of the City	Netflix	
June 14	Too Old to Die Young	Amazon Video	
June 30	The Loudest Voice	Showtime	
June 30	The Rook	Starz	
July 12	Shangri-La	Showtime	
July 31	Four Weddings and a Funeral	Hulu	
August 11	The Food That Built America	History	
August 12	Our Boys	HBO	
September 12	The I-Land	Netflix	
September 13	Unbelievable	Netflix	
September 20	Inside Bill's Brain: Decoding Bill Gates	Netflix	
October 5	Ghost Adventures: Serial Killer Spirits	Travel Channel	
October 6	Witches of Salem	Travel Channel	
October 18	Looking for Alaska	Hulu	
October 21	Catherine the Great	HBO	
October 27	Mrs. Fletcher	HBO	
November 4	The Devil Next Door	Netflix	
November 12	The Imagineering Story	Disney+	
November 13	The Preppy Murder: Death in Central Park	AMC/Sundance TV	
December 7	Steven Universe Future	Cartoon Network	
December 14	Darwin's Yearbook	Cartoon Network	
December 19	A Christmas Carol	FX	

== Television films and specials ==
These television films and specials are scheduled to premiere in 2019. The premiere dates may be changed depending on a variety of factors.

First aired	Title	Channel	Source
January 19	Brexit: The Uncivil War	HBO	
January 21	Bixler High Private Eye	Nickelodeon	
January 27	Rent: Live	Fox	
February 2	Death of a Cheerleader	Lifetime	
February 15	Kim Possible	Disney Channel	
February 17	Elvis All-Star Tribute	NBC	
March 3	Leaving Neverland	HBO	
March 8	Lucky	Nickelodeon	
March 16	Flip that Romance	Hallmark Channel	
March 18	The Inventor: Out for Blood in Silicon Valley	HBO	
March 23	Love to the Rescue	Hallmark Channel	
March 30	A Brush with Love	Hallmark Channel	
April 6	True Love Blooms	Hallmark Channel	
April 6	Native Son	HBO	
April 12	Black Hole Hunters	Smithsonian Channel	
April 13	The Resurgence: Demarcus Cousins	Showtime	
April 13	Bottled With Love	Hallmark Channel	
April 13	Secrets in a Small Town	Lifetime	
April 14	Morning Show Mysteries: A Murder in Mind	Hallmark Movies & Mysteries	
April 19	Cyberchase: Space Waste Odyssey	PBS Kids	
April 19	VICE: Special Report – The Future of Work	HBO	
April 20	I Am Somebody's Child: The Regina Louise Story	Lifetime	
April 20	My Mom's Letter From Heaven	Lifetime	
April 20	How High 2	MTV	
April 20	Easter Under Wraps	Hallmark Channel	
April 21	Motown 60: A Grammy Celebration	CBS	
April 21	Morning Show Mysteries: Countdown to Murder	Hallmark Movies & Mysteries	
April 27	Love Takes Flight	Hallmark Channel	
April 27	Smart Justice: The Jayme Closs Case	Lifetime	
April 28	Morning Show Mysteries: Death by Design	Hallmark Movies & Mysteries	
April 29	The Show Must Go On: The Queen + Adam Lambert Story	ABC	
May 1	Liberation Heroes: The Last Eyewitnesses	Discovery Channel	
May 3	At the Heart of Gold: Inside the USA Gymnastics Scandal	HBO	
May 3	ScreenTime: Diane Sawyer Reporting	ABC	
May 4	Paris, Wine & Romance	Hallmark Channel	
May 4	Surviving R. Kelly: The Impact	Lifetime	
May 4	Pregnant and Deadly	Lifetime	
May 5	Cher: Do You Believe?	Reelz	
May 5	Hailey Dean Mysteries: Death on Duty	Hallmark Movies & Mysteries	
May 6	Bachelorette Reunion: The Biggest Bachelorette Reunion in Bachelor History Ever!	ABC	
May 7	Foster	HBO	
May 11	My Dad Wrote a Porno	HBO	
May 11	A Feeling of Home	Hallmark Channel	
May 11	Homekilling Queen	Lifetime	
May 12	Hailey Dean Mysteries: Prescription for Murder	Hallmark Movies & Mysteries	
May 14	What's My Name: Muhammad Ali	HBO	
May 16	Unraveling the Mystery: A Big Bang Farewell	CBS	
May 17	Meghan and Harry Plus One	CBS	
May 17	No Exit	CBS	
May 17	Brendan Schaub You'd Be Surprised	Showtime	
May 18	Sailing into Love	Hallmark Channel	
May 18	Psycho Granny	Lifetime	
May 19	Meghan's New Life: The Real Princess Diaries	Lifetime	
May 19	JBFA: Stories from the 2019 James Beard Awards	ABC	
May 19	Hailey Dean Mysteries: Killer Sentence	Hallmark Movies & Mysteries	
May 19–20	Jeffrey Dahmer: Killer Cannibal	Reelz	
May 22	Live in Front of a Studio Audience: Norman Lear's All in the Family and The Jeffersons	ABC	
May 23	This is Farrah Fawcett	ABC	
May 25	Fatal Getaway	Lifetime	
May 25	From Friend To Fiance	Hallmark Channel	
May 26	Game of Thrones: The Last Watch	HBO	
May 27	Love in the Sun	Hallmark Channel	
May 27	Harry & Meghan: Becoming Royal	Lifetime	
May 27	Meghan & Harry: Baby Fever	Lifetime	
May 27	Rebecca Zahau: An ID Murder Mystery	Investigation Discovery	
May 27	Colin Quinn: Red State Blue State	CNN	
May 27	Diesel Brothers: Monster Jump Live	Discovery Channel	
May 28	Running with Beto	HBO	
May 31	Deadwood: The Movie	HBO	
May 31	Quiet Storm: The Ron Artest Story	Showtime	
May 31	Masters of Illusion: 21st Anniversary Special	The CW	
May 31	Secrets of the Sisterhood	Lifetime	
June 1	Pride and Prejudice: Atlanta	Lifetime	
June 1	Wedding at Graceland	Hallmark Channel	
June 5	Fatal Addiction: Hollywood's Secret Epidemic	Reelz	
June 6	The Cold Blue	HBO	
June 6	The Battle of Normandy: 85 Days in Hell	Smithsonian Channel	
June 7	Recipe for Danger	Lifetime Movies	
June 7	XY Chelsea	Showtime	
June 8	Wedding March 5: My Boyfriend's Back	Hallmark Channel	
June 8	Adriana Trigiani's Very Valentine	Lifetime	
June 9	Elton John: Ten Days That Rocked	Reelz	
June 9	Secrets In The Sky: The Untold Story of Skunk Works	History	
June 11	Ice on Fire	HBO	
June 11	OWN Presents: Inside WACO's Wearable Art Gala	Oprah Winfrey Network	
June 12	Oprah Winfrey Presents When They See Us Now	Oprah Winfrey Network/Netflix	
June 14	16 Shots	Showtime	
June 15	Tempting Fate	Lifetime	
June 15	Love, Take Two	Hallmark Channel	
June 15–16	Death in the Bayou: The Jennings 8	Investigation Discovery	
June 16	Game Changers: Inside the Video Game Wars	History	
June 16	Picture Perfect Mysteries: Newlywed and Dead	Hallmark Movies & Mysteries	
June 17	Ready Jet Go! One Small Step	PBS Kids	
June 17–18	Hogan	Golf Channel	
June 18	The Profit: An Inside Look	CNBC	
June 18	Wig	HBO	
June 19	When Whales Walked: Journeys in Deep Time	PBS/Smithsonian Channel	
June 22	To Have and To Hold	Lifetime	
June 22	The Last Bridesmaid	Hallmark Channel	
June 23	The Michael Jackson Story	Reelz	
June 23	Highwire Live in Times Square with Nik Wallenda	ABC	
June 23	Mystery 101: Playing Dead	Hallmark Movies & Mysteries	
June 23	Adolf Island	Smithsonian Channel	
June 24	Smithsonian Time Capsule: Beyond Stonewall	Smithsonian Channel	
June 24	Augusta National Women's Amateur Film	Golf Channel	
June 26	True Justice: Bryan Stevenson's Fight for Equality	HBO	
June 28	100%: Julian Edelman	Showtime	
June 29	Ramy Youssef: Feelings	HBO	
June 29	Family Pictures	Lifetime	
June 29	The Bobby DeBarge Story	TV One	
July 3	CMT Hometown Heroes	CMT	
July 4	CMT Let Freedom Sing!	CMT	
July 5	The Wrong Stepmother	Lifetime Movies	
July 6	Lavell Crawford: New Look, Same Funny!	Showtime	
July 7	The Day We Walked on the Moon	Smithsonian Channel	
July 7	Sins of the Father	TV One	
July 7	Christmas Camp	Hallmark Movies & Mysteries	
July 7	Evel Live 2	History	
July 7	A Fatal Confession: Keith Morrison Investigates	Investigation Discovery	
July 7	Peabody Presents: Stories of the Year	FX	
July 7	Apollo: Missions to the Moon	National Geographic	
July 8	Tom at Turnberry	Golf Channel	
July 8	Explorer: Journey to Europa	National Geographic	
July 8	The Armstrong Tapes	National Geographic	
July 8	Challenger Disaster: The Final Mission	National Geographic	
July 9	Mars: Inside SpaceX	National Geographic	
July 9	Apollo: Back to the Moon	National Geographic	
July 9–10	I Love You, Now Die: The Commonwealth v. Michelle Carter	HBO	
July 10	Hubble's Amazing Journey	National Geographic	
July 10	Mission Pluto and Beyond	National Geographic	
July 10	Mission Saturn: Inside the Rings	National Geographic	
July 12	The Wrong Boy Next Door	Lifetime Movies	
July 12	Bill Burr Presents IanTalk: Ideas Not Worth Spreading	Comedy Central	
July 13	A Merry Christmas Match	Hallmark Channel	
July 13	2019 Christmas: A First Look Preview Special	Hallmark Channel	
July 13	JFK Jr. and Carolyn's Wedding: The Lost Tapes	TLC	
July 14	In Broad Daylight	TV One	
July 14	Moon Landing: The Lost Tapes	History	
July 14	Cannibal Sharks	National Geographic	
July 15	Great Shark Chow Down	National Geographic	
July 16	Whale that Ate Jaws: Eye Witness Report	National Geographic	
July 16	The Lion King: Can You Feel The Love Tonight with Robin Roberts	ABC	
July 16–17	Behind Closed Doors: The Talwars	HBO	
July 17	Man vs. Shark	National Geographic	
July 18	Power, Influence and Hip-Hop: The Remarkable Rise of So So Def	WE tv	
July 18	Forecast: Shark Attack	National Geographic	
July 19	Shark Movers: Deadly Cargo	National Geographic	
July 19	The Wrong Mommy	Lifetime Movies	
July 19	Wonders of the Moon	BBC America	
July 20	Moon Landing Live	BBC America	
July 20	Apollo: The Forgotten Films	Discovery Channel	
July 20	Confessions from Space: Apollo	Discovery Channel	
July 21	Loved to Death	TV One	
July 21	World's Biggest Great White	National Geographic	
July 22	The Great Mother	Starz	
July 22	Tiger Woods - Chasing History	Golf Channel	
July 23	Cajun Navy	Discovery Channel	
July 23	USA Champions: The Story of the 2019 FIFA Women's World Cup	Fox	
July 23–24	Who Killed Garrett Phillips?	HBO	
July 25	Angel Brinks: The Real Bling	WE tv	
July 26	The Wrong Mommy	Lifetime Movies	
July 27	Heaven	Lifetime	
July 27	Share	HBO	
July 27	Uncovered: The McMartin Family Trials	Oxygen	
July 27	Rome in Love	Hallmark Channel	
July 28	2019 Summer Nights Preview Special	Hallmark Channel	
July 28	Deadly Dispatch	TV One	
July 31	Unmasking Jihadi John: Anatomy of a Terrorist	HBO	
August 2	Descendants 3	Disney Channel	
August 2	A Lover Scorned	Lifetime Movies	
August 3	Dark Angel	Lifetime	
August 3	Love and Sunshine	Hallmark Channel	
August 4	Aurora Teagarden Mysteries: A Game of Cat and Mouse	Hallmark Movies & Mysteries	
August 5	Pinkalicious & Peterrific: A Pinkaperfect Birthday	PBS Kids	
August 5	Kleptocrats	Starz	
August 6	A Boy. A Girl. A Dream	Starz	
August 7	Queen of the Pythons	Smithsonian Channel	
August 9	Rocko's Modern Life: Static Cling	Netflix	
August 9	Deadly Influencer	Lifetime Movies	
August 9	David Bowie: Finding Fame	Showtime	
August 10	A Taste of Summer	Hallmark Channel	
August 10	My Favorite Shapes by Julio Torres	HBO	
August 10	Manson: The Women	Oxygen	
August 10	Fallen Hearts	Lifetime	
August 11	Aurora Teagarden Mysteries: An Inheritance to Die For	Hallmark Movies & Mysteries	
August 11	Robin Williams: When the Laughter Stops	Reelz	
August 14	Alternate Endings: Six New Ways to Die in America	HBO	
August 16	Invader Zim: Enter the Florpus	Netflix	
August 17	Gates of Paradise	Lifetime	
August 17	A Summer Romance	Hallmark Channel	
August 17	Zombie Tidal Wave	Syfy	
August 18	I Am Patrick Swayze	Paramount Network	
August 18	Aurora Teagarden Mysteries: A Very Foul Play	Hallmark Movies & Mysteries	
August 18	John Wayne Gacy: Killer Clown's Revenge	Reelz	
August 19	The Legend of East Lake	Golf Channel	
August 24	Web of Dreams	Lifetime	
August 24	Hitsville: The Making of Motown	Showtime	
August 24	All Summer Long	Hallmark Channel	
August 25	Chronicle Mysteries: The Deep End	Hallmark Movies & Mysteries	
August 25	A Lifetime of Sundays	ESPN	
August 31	My One & Only	Hallmark Channel	
September 2	Steven Universe: The Movie	Cartoon Network	
September 2	The Secret Lives of Cheerleaders	Lifetime	
September 3	CONAN Without Borders: Greenland	TBS	
September 7	Patrick Swayze: Ghosts and Demons	Reelz	
September 7	Gary Owen:#DoinWhatIDo	Showtime	
September 7	Identity Theft of a Cheerleader	Lifetime	
September 8	The Wrong Cheerleader	Lifetime	
September 8	Witness to Murder: A Darrow Mystery	Hallmark Movies & Mysteries	
September 8	Volcanoes: Dual Destruction	Smithsonian Channel	
September 9	Out of Omaha	Starz	
September 9	Lip Sync to the Rescue	CBS	
September 11	In the Shadow of the Towers: Stuyvesant High on 9/11	HBO	
September 11	9/11: Inside Air Force One	History	
September 13	Hello Privilege. It's Me, Chelsea	Netflix	
September 14	Forever in My Heart	Hallmark Channel	
September 14	The Cheerleader Escort	Lifetime	
September 15	Undercover Cheerleader	Lifetime	
September 15	Comedy Central Roast of Alec Baldwin	Comedy Central	
September 15	Mystery 101: Words Can Kill	Hallmark Movies & Mysteries	
September 15	Capturing Chris Watts	Reelz	
September 15	Islands of Fire	Smithsonian Channel	
September 15	The Masked Singer: Super Sneak Peek	Fox	
September 15	Loch Ness Monster: New Evidence	Travel Channel	
September 15	Young Gifted and Broke: Our Student Loan Crisis	BET	
September 16	Beyoncé Presents: Making The Gift	ABC	
September 16	The 2019 NBC Primetime Preview Show	NBC	
September 17	CONAN without Borders: Ghana	TBS	
September 18	A Little Late with Lilly Singh: The Primetime Special	NBC	
September 19	The Paley Center Salutes The Good Place	NBC	
September 19	Return to Downton Abbey: A Grand Event	NBC	
September 19	The Last Days of Phil Hartman	ABC	
September 20	Savage x Fenty Show	Amazon Video	
September 21	Escaping The NXIVM Cult: A Mother's Fight to Save Her Daughter	Lifetime	
September 22	Mystery 101: Dead Talk	Hallmark Movies & Mysteries	
September 25	Buzz	HBO	
September 28	Trapped: The Alex Cooper Story	Lifetime	
September 29	Ruby Herring Mysteries: Her Last Breath	Hallmark Movies & Mysteries	
September 29	Outrageous Pumpkins	Food Network	
September 29	Star Wars: Galaxy's Edge - Adventure Awaits	Freeform	
October 3	A Working Mom's Nightmare	Lifetime Movies	
October 4	Smuggling in Suburbia	Lifetime Movies	
October 4	Haunted Salem: Live	Travel Channel	
October 4	Just Roll With It: You Decide LIVE!	Disney Channel	
October 5	Abducted: The Mary Stauffer Story	Lifetime	
October 5	Gary Gulman: The Great Depresh	HBO	
October 5	31 Nights of Halloween Fan Fest	Freeform	
October 5	Over the Moon in Love	Hallmark Channel	
October 6	Matchmaker Mysteries: A Killer Engagement	Hallmark Movies & Mysteries	
October 7	A Very Brady Renovation: Behind the Build Part 1	HGTV	
October 9	Isle of Chimps	Smithsonian Channel	
October 10	Torn Apart: Separated at the Border	HBO	
October 10	Sinister Seduction	Lifetime Movies	
October 11	Erasing his Dark Past	Lifetime Movies	
October 11	El Camino: A Breaking Bad Movie	Netflix	
October 11	My Little Pony: Friendship Is Magic – A Decade of Pony	Discovery Family	
October 12	The College Admissions Scandal	Lifetime	
October 12	The Banana Splits Movie	Syfy	
October 12	Love, Fall & Order	Hallmark Channel	
October 13	Crossword Mysteries: Proposing Murder	Hallmark Movies & Mysteries	
October 14	A Very Brady Renovation: Behind the Build Part 2	HGTV	
October 16	Gorillas of Gabon	Smithsonian Channel	
October 17	Psycho BFF	Lifetime Movies	
October 18	Sleeping with My Student	Lifetime Movies	
October 18	Sid & Judy	Showtime	
October 19	Patsy & Loretta	Lifetime	
October 19	Good Witch: Curse From a Rose	Hallmark Channel	
October 19	Countdown to Christmas 10th Anniversary Preview Special	Hallmark Channel	
October 20	Expedition Amelia	National Geographic	
October 20	Crossword Mysteries: Abracadaver	Hallmark Movies & Mysteries	
October 20	Uncovered: Killed by Hate	Oxygen	
October 21	2019 American Humane Hero Dog Awards	Hallmark Channel	
October 21	The Love of Dogs Benefit Concert	Hallmark Channel	
October 22	The Douglas Dynasty: Fame, Addiction and Finding Home	ABC	
October 23	Harry & Meghan: An African Journey	ABC	
October 24	Liberty: Mother of Exiles	HBO	
October 24	Saudi Women's Driving School	HBO	
October 24	Kindred Spirits	Lifetime Movies	
October 25	Designed to Kill	Lifetime Movies	
October 25	Sweet Mountain Christmas	Lifetime	
October 25	A Merry Christmas Match	Hallmark Movies & Mysteries	
October 26	Christmas Wishes & Mistletoe Kisses	Hallmark Channel	
October 26	OWN Spotlight: Oprah At Home with Lupita Nyong'o and Cynthia Erivo	Oprah Winfrey Network	
October 26	The Road Home for Christmas	Lifetime	
October 27	No Time Like Christmas	Lifetime	
October 27	A Christmas Movie Christmas	UPtv	
October 29	Botched: Most Outrageous Patients Special	E!	
October 30	World's Biggest Ghost Hunt: Pennhurst Asylum	A&E	
October 30	The Bronx, USA	HBO	
October 31	Ghost Adventures: Curse of the Harrisville Farmhouse	Travel Channel	
October 31	Nostalgic Christmas	Hallmark Movies & Mysteries	
November 1	Two Turtle Doves	Hallmark Movies & Mysteries	
November 1	Brendan Schaub You'd Be Surprised	Showtime	
November 1	Your Family or Your Life	Lifetime Movies	
November 2	Christmas Reservations	Lifetime	
November 2	Merry & Bright	Hallmark Channel	
November 3	Christmas Scavenger Hunt	Hallmark Channel	
November 3	Forever Christmas	Lifetime	
November 3	Christmas with a Prince: Becoming Royal	UPtv	
November 3	The Life of Earth	Smithsonian Channel	
November 5	The Wonderful World of Disney Presents The Little Mermaid Live!	ABC	
November 6	The Apollo	HBO	
November 7	A Blue Ridge Mountain Christmas	Hallmark Movies & Mysteries	
November 8	Holiday for Heroes	Hallmark Movies & Mysteries	
November 8	The Actors Studio Mastering the Art	Ovation	
November 8	Was I Really Kidnapped?	Lifetime Movies	
November 9	Amish Abduction	Lifetime Movies	
November 9	Radio Christmas	Lifetime	
November 9	A Christmas Duet	Hallmark Channel	
November 10	The Mistletoe Secret	Hallmark Channel	
November 10	A Sweet Christmas	Lifetime	
November 10	Memphis Belle in Color	Smithsonian Channel	
November 10	Rock N' Roll Christmas	UPtv	
November 10	Worst Cooks in America: Thanksgiving Redemption	Food Network	
November 11	Thanksgiving Grubdown	Cooking Channel	
November 11	Battle of Midway: The True Story	Smithsonian Channel	
November 12	Very Ralph	HBO	
November 12	Dolly Parton: Here She Comes Again!	ABC	
November 14	Thanksgiving Pie Fight	Food Network	
November 14	A Christmas Miracle	Hallmark Movies & Mysteries	
November 15	A Godwink Christmas: Meant For Love	Hallmark Movies & Mysteries	
November 15	One Fine Christmas	Oprah Winfrey Network	
November 15	A Daughter's Plan to Kill	Lifetime Movies	
November 15	Pariah: The Lives and Deaths of Sonny Liston	Showtime	
November 15	Christmas a la Mode	Lifetime	
November 16	Christmas in Louisiana	Lifetime	
November 16	My Sister's Deadly Secret	Lifetime Movies	
November 16	Double Holiday	Hallmark Channel	
November 17	The Christmas Club	Hallmark Channel	
November 17	Write Before Christmas	Hallmark Channel	
November 17	Random Acts of Christmas	Lifetime	
November 17	Good Eats: Thanksgiving Special	Food Network	
November 17	Christmas Cupcakes	UPtv	
November 19	Ernie & Joe: Crisis Cops	HBO	
November 21	Ready for War	Showtime	
November 21	Our Christmas Love Song	Hallmark Movies & Mysteries	
November 22	Christmas Under the Stars	Hallmark Movies & Mysteries	
November 22	Carole's Christmas	Oprah Winfrey Network	
November 22	Magical Christmas Shoes	Lifetime	
November 23	Twinkle All the Way	Lifetime	
November 23	My Husband's Secret Twin	Lifetime Movies	
November 23	Turkey Drop	Freeform	
November 23	Lil Rel Howery: Live in Crenshaw	HBO	
November 23	The Disappearance of the Millbrook Twins	Oxygen	
November 23	Picture a Perfect Christmas	Hallmark Channel	
November 24	Christmas at Graceland: Home for the Holidays	Hallmark Channel	
November 24	Christmas 9 to 5	Lifetime	
November 24	A Christmas Recipe for Romance	UPtv	
November 25	Check Inn to Christmas	Hallmark Channel	
November 26	A Gift to Remember 2	Hallmark Channel	
November 26	Dolly Parton: 50 Years at the Grand Ole Opry	NBC	
November 26	Lindsey Vonn: The Final Season	HBO	
November 27	Sense, Sensibility & Snowmen	Hallmark Channel	
November 27	A Very Vintage Christmas	Lifetime	
November 28	The Wonderful World of Disney: Magical Holiday Celebration	ABC	
November 28	Outrageous Holiday Houses	HGTV	
November 28	A Christmas Wish	Lifetime	
November 29	Staging Christmas	Lifetime	
November 29	Baking Christmas	Oprah Winfrey Network	
November 29	The Kacey Musgraves Christmas Show	Amazon Prime Video	
November 29	The Christmas Wish	Hallmark Movies & Mysteries	
November 29	Christmas at the Plaza	Hallmark Channel	
November 30	Christmas in Rome	Hallmark Channel	
November 30	Merry Liddle Christmas	Lifetime	
December 1	Christmas Town	Hallmark Channel	
December 1	Christmas Chalet	UPtv	
December 1	Lost Kingdom of the Black Pharaohs	Science Channel	
December 1	Snapped: Behind Bars - Sheila Davalloo	Oxygen	
December 2–3	Garth Brooks: The Road I'm On	A&E	
December 3	How to Train Your Dragon Homecoming	NBC	
December 3	Brad Paisley Thinks He's Special	ABC	
December 3	#TeamTrees	Discovery Channel	
December 4	Letter to the Editor	HBO	
December 4	Ghosting: The Spirit of Christmas	Freeform	
December 4	WWE WrestleMania's Legendary Moments	USA Network	
December 5	Same Time, Next Christmas	ABC	
December 5	This Time of Year	Hallmark Movies & Mysteries	
December 6	Time for You to Come Home for Christmas	Hallmark Movies & Mysteries	
December 6	Bill Burr Presents Jessica Kirson: Talking to Myself	Comedy Central	
December 6	Eddie Griffin: E-Niggma	Showtime	
December 6	A Storybook Christmas	Lifetime	
December 7	Matchmaker Christmas	Lifetime	
December 7	A Doggone Christmas	Lifetime	
December 7	Mistletoe & Menorahs	Lifetime	
December 7	He's Out to Get You	Lifetime Movies	
December 7	Dan Soder: Son of a Gary	HBO	
December 7	The SpongeBob Musical: Live on Stage!	Nickelodeon	
December 7	Give a Dog a Home Live!	Animal Planet	
December 7	A Christmas Love Story	Hallmark Channel	
December 8	Christmas at Dollywood	Hallmark Channel	
December 8	Grounded for Christmas	Lifetime	
December 8	AFV: America, This Is You!	ABC	
December 8	Dear Santa, I Need a Date	TV One	
December 8	Christmas in Paris	UPtv	
December 8	The Lost Women of NXIVM	Investigation Discovery	
December 8	Holidays Unwrapped	Disney Channel	
December 9	Beat Shazam: Santa Jamie	Fox	
December 11	Moonlight Sonata: Deafness In Three Movements	HBO	
December 12	Christmas in Montana	Hallmark Movies & Mysteries	
December 13	Angel Falls: A Novel Holiday	Hallmark Movies & Mysteries	
December 13	Disney Channel Holiday Party @ Walt Disney World	Disney Channel	
December 13	Mel Brooks Unwrapped	HBO	
December 13	A Christmas Melody	Lifetime	
December 14	You Light Up My Christmas	Lifetime	
December 14	A Christmas Winter Song	Lifetime	
December 14	Christmas in Evergreen: Tidings of Joy	Hallmark Channel	
December 15	Alice in Christmasland	Hallmark Channel	
December 15	Rediscovering Christmas	Lifetime	
December 15	Snowbound for Christmas	UPtv	
December 15	A Very Merry Cavallari	E!	
December 15	White House Christmas 2019	HGTV	
December 16	Good Trouble Holiday Special	Freeform	
December 16	Holidays with the Houghs	NBC	
December 16	Nick Cannon's Hit Viral Videos - Holidays 2019	Fox	
December 16	Jimmy Kimmel Live After Darth: A Star Wars Special	ABC	
December 18	Live in Front of a Studio Audience: Norman Lear's All in the Family and Good Times	ABC	
December 18	A Very Born This Way Christmas	A&E	
December 18	Finding The Way Home	HBO	
December 19	An Unforgettable Christmas	Hallmark Movies & Mysteries	
December 20	A Family Christmas Gift	Hallmark Movies & Mysteries	
December 20	Global Citizen Prize	NBC	
December 20	Celebrating Marvel's Stan Lee	ABC	
December 20	The Christmas Temp	Lifetime	
December 21	Battle of The Christmas Movie Stars	Lifetime	
December 21	The Christmas Hotel	Lifetime	
December 21	Christmas Love Letter	Lifetime	
December 21	Ultimate Hanukkah Challenge	Food Network	
December 21	It's Beginning to Look a Lot Like Christmas	Hallmark Channel	
December 22	Holiday Date	Hallmark Channel	
December 22	A Date By Christmas Eve	Lifetime	
December 22	Christmas Wedding Runaway	UPtv	
December 22–23	The Price Is Right at Night: A Holiday Extravaganza	CBS	
December 24	Baby in a Manger	UPtv	
December 25	Disney Parks Magical Christmas Day Parade	ABC	
December 25	When Calls the Heart: Home for Christmas	Hallmark Channel	
December 27	America Salutes You Presents Guitar Legends 3	The CW	
December 28	New Year, New Me	Hallmark Channel	
December 29	Cake-Off: New Year's Eve	Food Network	
December 31	A Toast to 2019!	NBC	
