= In Broad Daylight =

In Broad Daylight may refer to:

- In Broad Daylight (book), a true crime book by Harry N. MacLean
- In Broad Daylight (1991 film), an American TV film, based on the book
- In Broad Daylight (1971 film), an American TV film
- In Broad Daylight (2022 film), also known as Au grand jour, a Canadian drama film
- In Broad Daylight (2023 film)
