= No One Saw a Thing =

- Genre: Documentary
- Country of origin: United States
- Original language: English

Production
- Executive producers: Avi Belkin; Alexandra Shiva; Jason Blum; Jeremy Gold; Marci Wiseman
- Production company: Blumhouse Television

Original release
- Network: SundanceTV
- Release: August 1, 2019

No One Saw a Thing is an American documentary television series that was first shown on SundanceTV on August 1, 2019.

== Production ==
On February 27, 2018, it was announced that SundanceTV had given a six-episode series order to No One Saw a Thing, a new documentary television series directed by Avi Belkin. The series was executive produced by Belkin, Alexandra Shiva, Jason Blum, Jeremy Gold, and Marci Wiseman. Production companies include Blumhouse Television.

== Premise ==
No One Saw a Thing examines "an unsolved and mysterious death in the American Heartland and the effects of vigilantism in small town America. The case garnered international attention in the early 1980s after a resident, Ken Rex McElroy, was shot dead in front of almost 60 townspeople. These witnesses deny having seen anything, to this very day."

== Episodes ==
No.	Title	Directed by	Original release date	U.S. viewers (millions)
1	"The Killing of Ken Rex McElroy"	Avi Belkin	August 1, 2019	N/A
Known as the town bully, Ken Rex McElroy terrorized tiny Skidmore, Missouri, for decades. On July 10, 1981, the town had had enough and 60 people surrounded his pick-up truck and shot him dead on Main Street--but no one claimed to have seen a thing.
2	"Conspiracy of Silence"	Avi Belkin	August 8, 2019	N/A
Ken Rex's widow, Trena, comes forward with eyewitness testimony but investigators derail her at every turn. Rex's background and controversial relationships come to light. A brewing federal investigation threatens Skidmore's secret.
3	"Don't Mess With Skidmore"	Avi Belkin	August 15, 2019	N/A
Skidmore admits to a history of violence toward those who do not fit in. The FBI arrives and turns to the sheriff's role in the crime. Trena's fight for justice seems ever more elusive. The town begins to pay a different kind of price.
4	"Cycle of Violence"	Avi Belkin	August 22, 2019	N/A
20 years later, two shocking crimes rattle Skidmore's next generation. Wendy Gillenwater is beaten to death, Branson Perry vanishes from his home-- both in broad daylight. Rumors swirl, but as usual, no one seems to know anything.
5	"A Pound of Flesh"	Avi Belkin	August 29, 2019	N/A
Sheriff Espey is confident that Branson was murdered because of drug world connections. Tragedy once again visits Skidmore when Branson's cousin, Bobbie Jo Stinnett, is murdered at eight months pregnant and her unborn baby is stolen.
6	"Small Town Requiem"	Avi Belkin	September 5, 2019	N/A
Stinnett's baby is rescued. A Skidmore murder finally has closure. Residents hope to move past the Ken Rex Curse. There is no denying the cycle of violence. Skidmore aches to move on, it is clear they will never break their silence.

== Reception ==
Decider called it "amazing", where "Belkin does a good job of revisiting a case that captured the nation's — if not the world's — attention in the 1980s and brings some fresh perspective to it" by comparing the town's reactions via past archival shots and present interviews.

== See also ==
- In Broad Daylight (book)
- In Broad Daylight (1991 film)
