= Avi Belkin =

Israeli filmmaker

Avi Belkin (Hebrew: אבי בלקין) is an Israeli film director, producer and cinematographer.

== Education ==
Belkin studied art and film at HaMidrasha - Faculty of the Arts in Beit Berl, Israel.

== Film career ==
In 2012, Belkin produced and directed a short documentary film, Paddle Ball, that won first place at the Haifa International Film Festival that year. In 2014, his debut feature film Winding, about the Yarkon River, won the best film award.

Belkin directed the documentary feature Mike Wallace is Here that follows the life and career of American journalist Mike Wallace (2019) and directed and executive produced a 6 part true-crime documentary series No One Saw a Thing (2019) that tells the story of a small violent town in Missouri.

== Filmography ==
Year	Title	Work Type	Genre	Role
2012	Paddle ball	Short Film	Feature Film	Director
2007	Elephant Graveyard	Documentary	Feature Film	Director
2014	Winding.	Documentary	Feature Film	Director
2019	No One Saw a Thing	TV Mini Series	Series	Director
2019	Mike Wallace Is Here	Documentary	Feature Film	Director
2026	Odyssey	Documentary	Feature Film	Director
