= Disappearance of Branson Perry =

American disappearance case

Branson Perry
- Born: Branson Kayne Perry; February 24, 1981
- Disappeared: April 11, 2001 (aged 20); Skidmore, Missouri, U.S. 40.287608°N 95.083246°W
- Status: Missing for 25 years, 6 months and 14 days
- Height: 5 ft 9 in (1.75 m)
- Relatives: Bobbie Jo Stinnett (cousin)

On April 11, 2001, Branson Kayne Perry, a 20-year-old from Skidmore, Missouri, disappeared after leaving his home on West Oak Street. He has not been seen since. His disappearance drew national attention and later received additional coverage because he was a cousin of Bobbie Jo Stinnett, whose 2004 murder in Skidmore became a widely publicized case.

In 2003, investigators identified Presbyterian minister Jack Wayne Rogers as a possible suspect after his arrest on unrelated assault and child pornography charges. However, he was never charged in connection with Perry's disappearance and denied involvement. The case has remained open. In 2022 the Nodaway County Sheriff announced that a new suspect had been identified, though additional evidence was needed before an arrest could be made.

Perry's disappearance has been featured in national media, including Diane Fanning's book Baby Be Mine, an episode of America's Most Wanted, and the Sundance Channel documentary series No One Saw a Thing.

== Background ==
Branson Kayne Perry was born February 24, 1981, and raised in Skidmore, Missouri. He graduated from Nodaway-Holt High School in 1999. After graduating he worked odd jobs, including work as a roofer and helping maintain a traveling petting zoo in the area. He lived with his father, Bob Perry, at 304 West Oak Street in Skidmore; his parents were recently divorced. The younger Perry suffered from tachycardia, a condition that made his heart race excessively. He was a black belt in hapkido.

On April 7, 2001, Perry visited the home of his neighbor Jason Biermann and was inadvertently drugged. While intoxicated, he allegedly danced around the house nude, shaved his pubic hair and engaged in sex with Biermann. After the incident, Perry confessed it to his father and was upset as he felt he had been taken advantage of. Perry's father said he knew that his son was homosexual and suspected he’d had encounters with men in the past, but was nevertheless angry with Biermann for "drugging and then using his son."

== Disappearance ==
On the afternoon of April 11, 2001, Perry invited his friend Jena over to his house to help clean the residence as his father, Bob Perry, who had recently been hospitalized, was due to return home. At the time, two other unnamed men were outside the residence working on Bob's car, which needed a new alternator. At approximately 3:00 p.m., Perry told Jena he was going to take a pair of jumper cables outside to a shed adjacent to the house. This is the last known sighting of Perry.

== Investigation ==
On April 12, Perry's grandmother, Jo Ann, stopped by his home and found the house unlocked and deserted. She found this unusual and called the residence periodically over the next several days, but got no answer. Upon calling Perry's mother, Rebecca Klino, she found she had not spoken to him either. Bob was discharged from the hospital several days later than planned. After his release, Bob and Klino filed a missing person report on April 17. Ground search parties were organized by Nodaway County police within a 15-mile (24 km) radius of the Perry residence. Numerous fields, farms, and abandoned buildings were searched, but the efforts proved fruitless. During a search of the property, police were unable to locate the jumper cables Perry had purportedly left to return in the shed; two weeks later, however, they were found just inside the door.

Over the following month and a half, over one hundred people were interviewed in Perry's disappearance. Jena, who had been at Perry's home the day of the disappearance, admitted to law enforcement that he had recently been experimenting with marijuana and amphetamines. A family member also informed police that Perry had a bottle of Valium in his possession the day he disappeared. Law enforcement questioned drug acquaintances of Perry's in St. Joseph, but all stated they had not seen him and each passed polygraph examinations. Further investigation into the local drug trade was undertaken, but no discernible leads were uncovered despite rumors that Perry owed drug dealers money. Bob initially suspected that his son had left to stay with friends in Kansas City. Because Perry did not have a working car at the time, Bob presumed he may have hitchhiked.

== Jack Wayne Rogers ==
On April 10, 2003, law enforcement arrested Jack Wayne Rogers, a 59-year-old Presbyterian minister and Boy Scout leader. Rogers was arrested on charges of first-degree assault and practicing medicine without a license after removing a transgender woman's genitals in a makeshift gender reassignment surgery at a hotel in Columbia, Missouri.

While investigating Rogers' personal belongings, detectives discovered child pornography on his computer, as well as evidence of various posts made on message boards under the usernames "BuggerButt", "ohailsatan", and "extremebodymods", describing the graphic torture and assault of multiple men. In the posts, Rogers also discussed cannibalizing the genitals of men he had castrated. Among these posts was a firsthand account of Rogers picking up a blond male hitchhiker, then raping, torturing, mutilating, and murdering him. In the online post, it was claimed that the man's body was buried in a remote area of the Ozarks. Despite this, Rogers denied ever seeing Perry or knowing him, and asserted that the post was fabricated and purely fantasy; law enforcement, however, suspected the man in question was Perry. While performing a subsequent search of Rogers' property, a turtle claw necklace resembling one owned by Perry was discovered in one of his vehicles.

In April 2004, Rogers was convicted and sentenced to seventeen years in prison for assault and seven years for performing illegal surgery, as well as thirty years for child pornography charges, which would run concurrent with the former two charges. At his sentencing, Perry's mother begged Rogers to reveal his whereabouts, but Rogers denied being involved in the disappearance. His earliest release date is October 30, 2028, when he would be 83 years old. After attending the sentencing, Perry's mother stated she no longer felt Rogers was responsible for her son's disappearance:

The police are not completely ruling him out, but now the investigation has turned towards Skidmore again. They have received new leads there. I suppose time has a way of unraveling secrets. I believe someone in that area knows what happened to Branson. In my heart, I don't believe this suspect is responsible. Despite the nightmare I lived through [at his sentencing], I am thankful that someone with that much evil will never walk the streets again.

== Subsequent developments ==
Perry's father died in 2004. In June 2009, law enforcement revealed they were completing an excavation of a site in Quitman, Missouri, after receiving a "credible tip" that Perry's remains may have been located there. Over a period of two days, excavators dug a 23-foot (7.0 m)-deep hole that covered an area of around 20 feet (6.1 m) by 40 feet (12 m). At the time, another local farmer who resided 1.5 miles (2.4 km) east of Quitman stated that law enforcement had searched his property several years prior searching for an abandoned well, but the search yielded no results. In 2010, Klino offered a $20,000 reward for information leading to her son's whereabouts.

In February 2011, Klino died after a years-long battle with melanoma. Jo Ann Stinnett, Perry's grandmother, said at the time of Klino's death: "Around town, we searched every oil well, every outside toilet. We searched everywhere that was possible for us to think that something could be there." Monica Caison, the founder of the CUE Center for Missing Persons and a friend of Klino, stated that she and other close friends have "promised her they would continue to look for her son." In her obituary, it was noted that Klino was "preceded in death" by Perry, and she was buried beside an empty plot for Perry that lists his date of death as April 11, 2001, the same day he disappeared.

On August 14, 2022, the current Nodaway County Sheriff, Randy Strong, announced a suspect had been identified, but more evidence was needed before an arrest could be made.

In May 2024, the Nodaway County Sheriff's Office again received a "credible tip" that Perry's remains might be buried beneath a well in Quitman. Multiple law enforcement agencies, including the FBI, searched the site, but no new evidence was located.

In April 2026, on the 25th anniversary of Perry's disappearance, a family member announced a $100,000 reward for information leading to the location of Branson's remains and the successful prosecution of those responsible.

== Publicity ==
Perry's disappearance was profiled extensively in a chapter of Diane Fanning's 2006 book Baby Be Mine, though the chief focus of that book was on the murder of his cousin, Bobbie Jo Stinnett, in 2004. The case also received coverage in a July 17, 2010, episode of the Fox television program America's Most Wanted and in the Sundance Channel series No One Saw a Thing in 2019.

== See also ==
- List of people who disappeared mysteriously (2000–present)
- Murder of Bobbie Jo Stinnett, Perry's cousin, in 2004

== Sources ==
- Fanning, Diane (2006). Baby Be Mine: The Shocking True Story of a Woman Who Murdered a Pregnant Mother to Steal Her Child. New York: Macmillan. ISBN 978-1-429-93683-5.
- Phelps, M. William (2006). Murder in the Heartland. New York: Kensington Books. ISBN 978-0-758-21724-0.
