= Ken McElroy =

American criminal and murder victim (1934–1981)

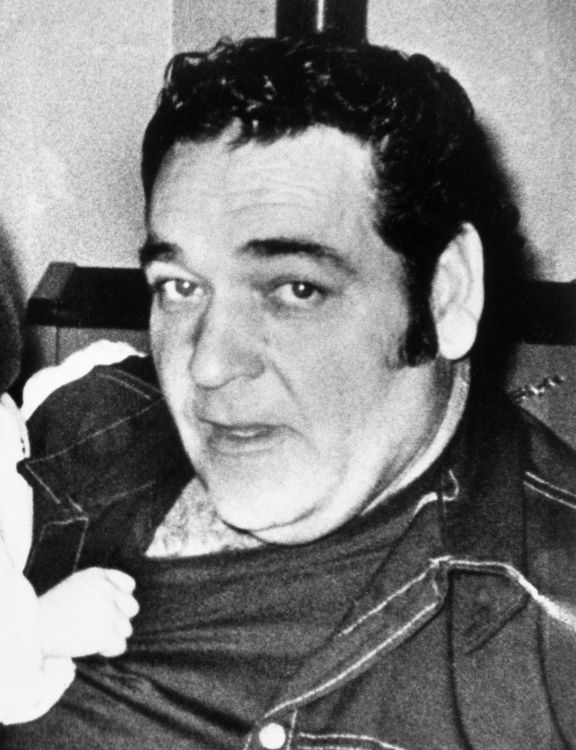
- McElroy c. 1981
- Born: Kenneth Rex McElroy; June 16, 1934; Nodaway County, Missouri, U.S.
- Died: July 10, 1981 (aged 47); Skidmore, Missouri, U.S.
- Cause of death: Homicide via gunshot wounds to the chest, head and neck
- Known for: Recipient of vigilante justice
- Spouses: Oleta Holland (m. 1952; div. 1958) Sharon McElroy (m. 1958; div. 1964) Alice Wood (m. 1964; div. 1972) Trena McCloud (m. 1974)
- Children: 17+

Details
- Victims: Bo Bowenkamp (attempted murder); Trena McElroy (statutory rape); Two McCloud family dogs (killed)
- Date: July 8, 1980 (Bowenkamp)

Kenneth Rex McElroy (June 16, 1934 – July 10, 1981) was an American criminal, convicted attempted murderer, child rapist, arsonist, and animal abuser who resided in Skidmore, Missouri. He was known as "the town bully", and his unsolved killing became the focus of international attention. Over the course of his life, McElroy was accused of dozens of felonies, including assault, child molestation, statutory rape, arson, animal cruelty, hog and cattle rustling, and burglary.

In all, he was indicted 21 times but escaped conviction each time, except for the last. In 1981, McElroy was convicted of second-degree assault in the non-fatal shooting of the town's 70-year-old grocer Ernest "Bo" Bowenkamp. McElroy was released on bond pending an appeal, after which he engaged in a harassment campaign against Bowenkamp and others who were sympathetic to Bowenkamp, including the town's Church of Christ minister.

On June 30, 1981, he appeared in a local bar, the D&G Tavern, armed with an M1 Garand rifle and bayonet, and later threatened to kill Bowenkamp. The next week, McElroy was shot and killed as he sat with his wife Trena in his pickup truck on Skidmore's main street. He was struck by bullets from at least two different firearms, in front of a crowd of people estimated as numbering between 30 and 46. Despite the many witnesses, nobody came forward to say who shot him, and no one has been charged in connection with McElroy's death.

== Early life ==
McElroy was born on June 16, 1934, the 15th of 16 children born to Tony and Mabel (née Lister) McElroy. His parents were poor migrant tenant farmers who had moved between Kansas and the Ozarks before settling outside of Skidmore. He dropped out of school at age 15 in the eighth grade and quickly established a local reputation as a cattle rustler and small-time thief. For more than two decades, McElroy was suspected of being involved in theft of grain, gasoline, alcohol, antiques, and livestock, but he avoided conviction when charges were brought against him 21 times — often after witnesses refused to testify because he allegedly intimidated them, frequently by following his targets or parking outside their homes and watching them. He was represented by defense attorney Richard Gene McFadin of Gallatin, Missouri.

McElroy had at least 17 children by three of his wives and three other young women and girls. With second wife Sharon (born c. 1943) he had Jerome, Tammy Sue, Debbie, Tina, and Theresa (born 1959, 1961, 1963, 1964, 1965); with third wife Alice Wood (born c. 1946) he had Juarez, Tonia "Tony", and Ken Jr. (born 1969, 1973, 1975); with fourth wife Trena McCloud (1957–2012) he had Jerome "Jeffy" (later Derome), Oleta, and Reno (born 1973, 1976/7, 1978). A 15-year-old named Donna bore a son c. 1959; Marcia Surritte had Tony in 1971. With a girl Harry N. MacLean calls "Sally D." (born c. 1947), McElroy had four children — another Ken Jr., Lisa, Jeffery, and a fourth (born 1961, 1963, 1964, 1965) — who were put up for adoption when the youngest was born.

He met his last wife, Trena McCloud, when she was 12 years old and in eighth grade and he was 35. He raped McCloud repeatedly. McCloud's parents initially opposed the relationship, but McElroy threatened them into agreement by burning down their house and shooting the family dog. McCloud became pregnant when she was fourteen, dropped out of school in the ninth grade, and went to live with McElroy and his third wife Alice. McElroy divorced Alice and married Trena in order to escape charges of statutory rape, to which she was the only witness. Sixteen days after Trena gave birth, she and Alice fled to Trena's parents' house. According to court records, McElroy tracked them down and brought them back. When the McClouds were away, McElroy once again burned their house down and shot their new dog.

== Events prior to his killing ==
Based on Trena's story, McElroy was indicted in June 1973 for arson, assault, and statutory rape. He was arrested, booked, arraigned, and released on $2,500 bail. Trena and her baby were placed in foster care at a home in Maryville, Missouri. McElroy sat outside the foster home for hours at a time staring at it. He told the foster family that he would trade "girl for girl" to get his child back, since he knew where the foster family's biological daughter went to school and what bus route she rode. Additional charges were filed against McElroy.

On July 27, 1976, Skidmore farmer Romaine Henry said McElroy shot him twice with a shotgun in the stomach after Henry challenged him for shooting weapons on Henry's property. McElroy was charged with assault with intent to kill. McElroy denied he was at the scene. As the case dragged on without a court date, Henry said McElroy had parked outside his home at least 100 times. At the trial, two raccoon hunters testified they were with McElroy the day of the shooting away from Henry's property. Henry was forced to admit in court, under questioning by McElroy's attorney Richard Gene McFadin, that he had concealed his own petty criminal conviction from more than 30 years prior. McElroy was acquitted. Reportedly, he had stalked and intimidated members of the jury before the trial and burned down a barn owned by the judge.

== 1981 killing ==
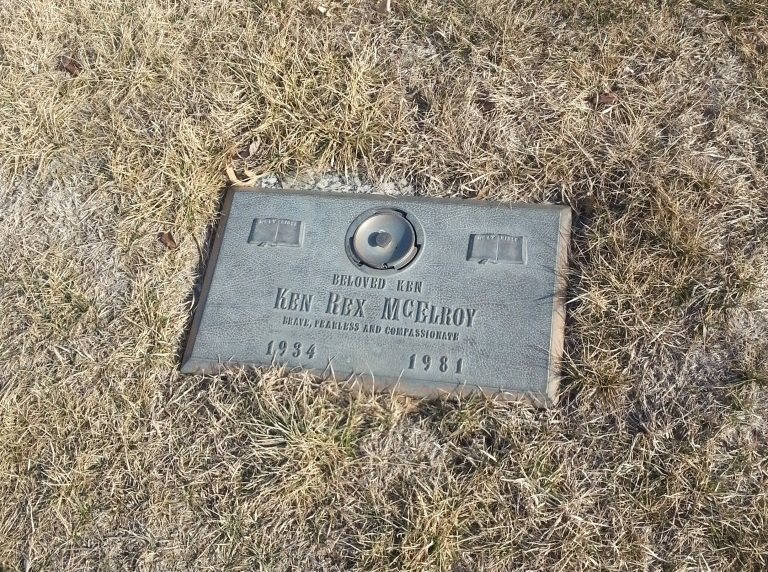
McElroy's grave

In 1980, one of McElroy's children got into an argument with a clerk, Evelyn Sumy, in a local grocery store owned by 70-year-old Ernest "Bo" Bowenkamp and his wife Lois, allegedly because the young McElroy child tried to steal jawbreakers. McElroy began stalking the Bowenkamp family, and eventually threatened Bo Bowenkamp in the back of his store with a shotgun in hand. In the ensuing confrontation, McElroy shot Bowenkamp in the neck; Bowenkamp survived, and McElroy was arrested and charged with first degree assault, which carried a possible life sentence. In June 1981, McElroy was convicted of second degree assault and received a two-year sentence, but was freed on bail pending his appeal. Immediately after being released at a post-trial hearing, McElroy went to the D&G Tavern, a local bar, with an M1 Garand rifle with a bayonet attached, and made graphic threats about what he would do to Bo Bowenkamp. This led to several patrons deciding to see what they could legally do to prevent McElroy from harming anyone else.

McElroy's appeal hearing was again delayed. On the morning of July 10, 1981, townspeople met at the Legion Hall in the center of town with Nodaway County sheriff Dan Estes to discuss how to protect themselves. During the meeting, McElroy arrived at the D&G Tavern with Trena. As he sat drinking at the bar, word got back to the men at the Legion Hall that he was in town. Sheriff Estes instructed the assembled group not to get into a direct confrontation with McElroy, but instead seriously consider forming a neighborhood watch program. Estes then drove out of town in his police cruiser. The citizens at the meeting decided to go to the tavern en masse; the bar soon filled completely. After McElroy finished his drinks, he purchased a six pack of beer, left the bar, and entered his pickup truck.

=== Death ===
While sitting in his red truck, McElroy was shot at several times but hit only twice—once by a centerfire bullet and once by a .22 rimfire bullet. In all, there were 46 potential witnesses to the shooting, including Trena McElroy, who was in the truck with her husband when he was shot. Nobody called for an ambulance. Every witness was either unable to name an assailant, or claimed not to have seen who fired the fatal shots, including the unnamed man who helped McElroy's wife, Trena, as she "scrambled out of the truck screaming" covered in blood. The DA declined to press charges, and an extensive federal investigation did not lead to any charges either. Missouri-based journalist Steve Booher described the attitude of some townspeople as "he needed killing."

=== Aftermath ===
McElroy was buried at Memorial Park Cemetery in St. Joseph, Missouri. On July 9, 1984, Trena McElroy filed a $5 million wrongful death lawsuit against the Town of Skidmore, County of Nodaway, Sheriff Danny Estes, Steve Peters (Mayor of Skidmore), and Del Clement (whom Trena accused of being the shooter, but who was never charged). The case was later settled out of court by all parties for $17,600, with no one admitting guilt, for the stated reason of avoiding costly legal fees should the suit proceed. Trena remarried and moved to Lebanon, Missouri, where she died of cancer on her 55th birthday on January 24, 2012.

== In popular culture ==
- 60 Minutes ran a segment on the story in 1982.
- In January 1983 the hard rock group UFO released their eleventh studio album Making Contact; its second track "Diesel in the Dust", composed and written by band members Neil Carter and Phil Mogg, is loosely based around the events of Skidmore, Missouri (Ken McElroy is referred to as Ted McKinley in the lyrics).
- A 1988 book about McElroy's murder, In Broad Daylight, by Harry N. MacLean, was adapted into the made-for-TV movie In Broad Daylight in 1991, starring Brian Dennehy, Cloris Leachman, Marcia Gay Harden, and Chris Cooper.
- On February 23, 2018, the webseries BuzzFeed Unsolved covered McElroy's murder.
- The event was the subject of No One Saw a Thing, a 2019 television documentary mini-series on Sundance TV.
- The events were the subject of the show Kenrex, a one-man stage play by Jack Holden and Ed Stambollouian, with an original live Americana soundtrack by John Patrick Elliott (The Little Unsaid). The show played at Sheffield's Crucible Theatre in October and November 2024. The production transferred to London's The Other Palace in 2025. It was nominated for six Olivier Awards, winning Best Actor and Best Sound Design. The production is currently open at the Lucille Lortel Theatre In New York since April 2026.
- Ken McElroy's murder was featured in 2019 episode "Drunk Mystery II", S6 E8 of Drunk History.
- Inspired the 2003 film Dunsmore, starring W. Earl Brown as town bully Ronnie Roy Pritcher.

== See also ==
- List of unsolved murders (1980–1999)
- Vigilantism

== Sources ==
- Krajicek, David (August 2006). "Notorious Murders; Timeless Classics; Ken McElroy". Crime Library. TruTV. Archived from the original on June 5, 2008.
- MacLean, Harry N. (1988). In broad daylight: a murder in Skidmore, Missouri (1st ed.). New York: Harper & Row. ISBN 978-0-06-015876-7.
