= Murder of Bobbie Jo Stinnett =

2004 murder in Skidmore, Missouri, U.S.

Coordinates: 40.28874°N 95.08487°W

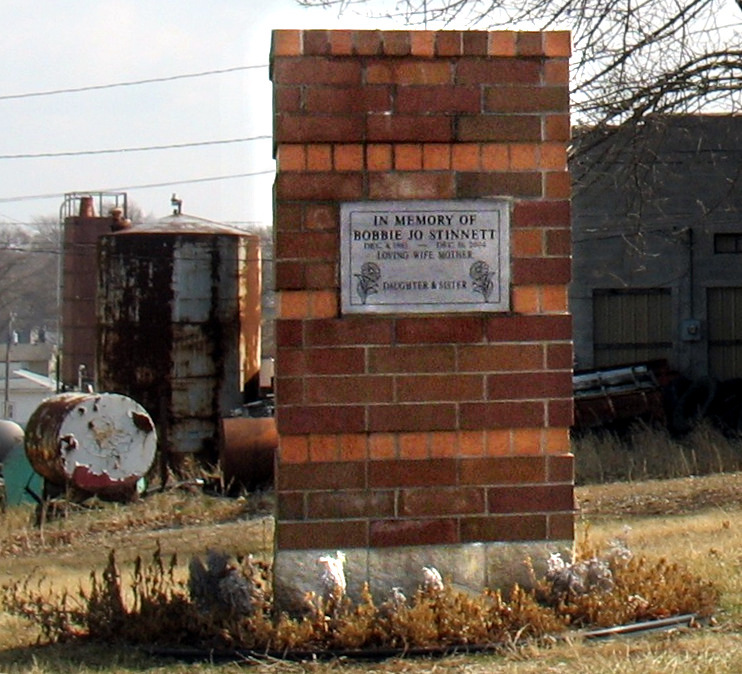
- Memorial to Bobbie Jo Stinnett in Skidmore, Missouri
- Location: 410 Elm Street, Skidmore, Missouri, U.S.
- Date: December 16, 2004
- Attack type: Murder by strangulation, stabbing, kidnapping
- Weapon: Knife
- Victim: Bobbie Jo Stinnett
- Verdict: Guilty
- Convictions: Kidnapping resulting in death
- Sentence: Death by lethal injection
- Convicted: Lisa Marie Montgomery

External images
- Bobbie Jo Stinnett, in 2000 yearbook picture from Nodaway-Holt Junior Senior High
- The home of Bobbi Jo Stinnett, in Skidmore, Missouri, December 17, 2004.

Bobbie Jo Stinnett (December 4, 1981 – December 16, 2004) was a 23-year-old pregnant American woman who was murdered in Skidmore, Missouri, in December 2004. Perpetrator Lisa Marie Montgomery, then aged 36, strangled Stinnett to death and cut her unborn child from her uterus eight months into gestation. Montgomery's motive was to produce a baby, as she had been faking a pregnancy. Montgomery was arrested in Kansas the next day and charged with kidnapping resulting in death – a federal crime due to the interstate nature of the offense. Stinnett's baby, who had survived the crude caesarean section, was safely recovered by authorities and returned to the father.

Montgomery was tried and found guilty in 2007. She was executed by lethal injection shortly after midnight on January 13, 2021, having exhausted the appeals process. Montgomery became the 17th woman to be executed in the United States since 1976, and the first female federal inmate since 1953 to be executed by the United States federal government.

== Background ==
Bobbie Jo Stinnett was born on December 4, 1981, and graduated from Nodaway-Holt High School in Graham, Missouri, in 2000. Stinnett and her husband ran a dog-breeding business from their residence in Skidmore.

Stinnett and Montgomery had met through dog show events and had ongoing interactions in an online Rat Terrier chatroom called Ratter Chatter. In these emails, Montgomery used the alias 'Darlene Fischer." Montgomery told Stinnett that she was pregnant too, leading to the two women chatting online and exchanging e-mails about their pregnancies. Using this alias, Montgomery contacted Stinnett on December 15, 2004, via instant message. Stinnett had a litter of puppies for sale, and Montgomery expressed interest in purchasing one. The women agreed to meet the next day. Although Montgomery lived in Melvern, Kansas, she told Stinnett that she was from Fairfax, Missouri, a town near Skidmore. That night, Stinnett told her husband and her mother, Becky Harper, that a woman from Fairfax was going to stop by and look at the puppies.

== Murder ==
On December 16, Montgomery drove from Melvern to Skidmore and arrived at Stinnett's home around 12:30 p.m. Montgomery carried a sharp kitchen knife and a white cord in her jacket pocket. Stinnett brought the puppies outside and played with them with Montgomery. At 12:30 p.m., Stinnett received a phone call from Becky Harper, her mother, and confirmed that she would give Harper a ride home from work at 3:30 p.m.

After the phone call ended, Montgomery and Stinnett spent approximately two hours together at Stinnett's home. Following that, Montgomery subsequently attacked Stinnett and used the cord to strangle her until she was unconscious. Montgomery then used the kitchen knife to cut into Stinnett's abdomen, causing Stinnett to regain consciousness. A struggle ensued, and Montgomery strangled Stinnett a second time, killing her. Montgomery extracted the baby from Stinnett's body, cut the umbilical cord, and left with the baby. Meanwhile, after driving a short distance from Stinnett's home, Montgomery stopped to clamp the umbilical cord and to suction any mucus from the baby's mouth. The baby cried, but other than a cut above her eye, she was uninjured. After cleaning the baby with wipes, Montgomery retrieved the car seat she had stored in the trunk of her car and placed the baby in the seat. She then promptly drove to Topeka, Kansas.

After 3:30 p.m. came and Stinnett did not return any calls, Harper walked to Stinnett's house herself. She discovered Stinnett lying in a pool of blood, approximately an hour after the murder. Harper immediately called authorities and described the wounds inflicted upon her daughter as appearing as if her "stomach had exploded." Paramedics were unsuccessful in attempts to revive Stinnett, and she was pronounced dead at St. Francis Hospital in Maryville.

Montgomery called her husband, Kevin, that same day around 5:15 p.m. saying that, on a Christmas shopping trip in Topeka, she had gone into labor and given birth. It was initially seen as unusual that she delivered a baby and then drove herself home right after. She said she delivered at the Birth And Women's Center in Topeka, although there were no reported births there on the day she described.

The following day, December 17, police arrested Montgomery at her farmhouse in Melvern, Kansas. A witness would later report that on the morning before her arrest, Montgomery took the infant, her husband, and two teenage sons to a restaurant for breakfast. Kathy Sage, owner of the Whistle Top Cafe in Melvern, Kansas, said she was showing the baby off as her own. She also reportedly took the child to church and said she named the child "Abigail" since it was from the Bible.

== Investigation ==
The investigation was aided by the issuance of an Amber alert to enlist the public's help. The alert was initially denied as it had not been used before in an unborn child's case and thus there was no description of the victim. Eventually after intervention by Congressman Sam Graves, the alert was implemented.

Police had initially gone to Montgomery's home at 32419 S Adams Rd in Melvern, Kansas after tracing online communications to her IP address, hoping to interview her as a witness. When they arrived, they found a car matching the description of the one at the crime scene. After ringing the doorbell, Kevin let the officers into the home where they found Montgomery inside, holding the infant and watching television.

Sergeant Investigator Randy Strong explained that they were investigating the murder of Bobbie Jo Stinnett. He asked about the baby, and Montgomery said that she had given birth at a women's clinic in Topeka. She asked Kevin to retrieve the discharge papers from his truck. Kevin searched the truck, but he could not find the papers.

Strong then asked to speak to Montgomery outside the home. Montgomery allowed a law enforcement officer to hold the baby and accompanied Strong. Montgomery explained that her family was having some financial problems, so, unbeknownst to her husband, she had given birth at home, with the help of two friends. When asked the names of the friends, Montgomery responded that they had not been with her at the house but were available by phone in case she had trouble delivering the baby. Montgomery said that she had given birth in the kitchen and had disposed of the placenta in a nearby creek. At Montgomery's request, the officers moved their questioning to the sheriff's office. Shortly thereafter, Montgomery confessed to killing Stinnett, removing the baby from Stinnett's womb, and abducting the child. This all occurred within an hour timeframe. The kidnapped newborn, whom she claimed as her own, was recovered and soon placed in custody of the father.

DNA testing was used to confirm the infant's identity, and prove that Montgomery did not deliver the child.

== Perpetrator ==
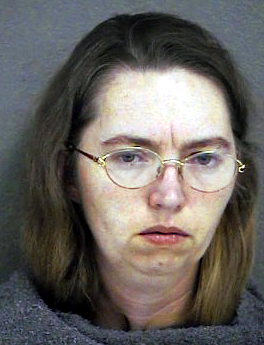
Lisa Montgomery

Lisa Marie Montgomery (February 27, 1968 – January 13, 2021) was born in Pierce County, Washington, and resided in Melvern, Kansas, at the time of the murder. Montgomery's father was a U.S. Army veteran of the Vietnam War, while her mother's alcohol addiction led to Lisa being born with permanent brain damage. She was raised in a physically, emotionally, and sexually abusive home from the age of 11. Lisa reported rapes against her involving her stepfather Jack and several other men which were anal, oral, and vaginal. They would beat and slap her if she was “doing it wrong.” When they were done, they urinated on her. On several instances, her mother forced her to have sex with her stepfather and his friends; she was beaten if she resisted, the mother even going as far as killing the family dog in front of her as punishment. There was also a time when she ran to the police to report that she was being gang-raped; the police officers returned her to her mother who facilitated the assaults.

Her stepfather built a room off his trailer, accessible only outside of it. He would force Lisa to live in this room, isolating her from her sisters as much as possible. In this room, Jack told Lisa that he was teaching her how to be a good wife. He would rape and sodomize her until she bled.

Starting around age 11, her mother began having servicemen come to the trailer to build a new living room. She paid for the living room by pimping Lisa out to the servicemen, calling it a "family secret" to her sons (Lisa's half-brothers).

Lisa's older half-sister, Diane Mattingly, was removed from their home and placed in foster care. Montgomery was very close to Mattingly, and was crushed when she learned she couldn't go with her. She sought escape through alcohol. When Montgomery was 14, her mother discovered the abuse and reacted by threatening her at gunpoint.

Montgomery, in order to escape the abusive home situation, married her stepbrother Carl Boman in August 1986. She had just turned 18. She had her first child in January 1987, with three more following before she underwent a tubal ligation in 1990. She falsely claimed to be pregnant several times after the procedure. Montgomery claimed that she was forced to undergo the procedure by her husband/step-brother, as well as her mother.

In the years following the sterilization procedure, Montgomery claimed that she had four more pregnancies. In 1994, while separated from Boman, Montgomery had an affair and claimed to be pregnant. Montgomery and Boman later reconciled, and she ceased making the claim. She and Boman divorced in 1998. In 2000, before she and Kevin (her second husband) were married, she told him that she was pregnant and intended to have an abortion. Kevin gave her forty dollars, and the pregnancy was not mentioned again. In 2002, Montgomery told her friends and family that she was pregnant again. Although she said that she was receiving prenatal care from her physician, she would not allow Kevin to attend the alleged appointments. Her physician testified that he had treated Montgomery for ankle pain and a cold, but he did not provide her any prenatal care, despite Montgomery's claims to the contrary. When the alleged due date passed, Montgomery told Kevin that the baby had died and that she had donated its body to science.

Montgomery again claimed in the spring of 2004 that she was pregnant and due in December. This coincided with a custody battle, which also started up roughly in the same time of spring 2004. This custody battle was between her ex-husband (and step-brother) and herself. It is believed she faked this particular pregnancy to win over the judge during the court hearings.

Boman knew that Montgomery was unable to become pregnant and that she was again making baseless pregnancy claims. He and his new wife sent emails to Montgomery, telling her that they planned to expose her deception and use it against her in the custody proceedings. Montgomery said that she would prove them wrong. On December 10, 2004, days before the kidnapping, Boman filed a motion for change of custody of the two minor children who lived with Montgomery.

== Trial and ruling ==
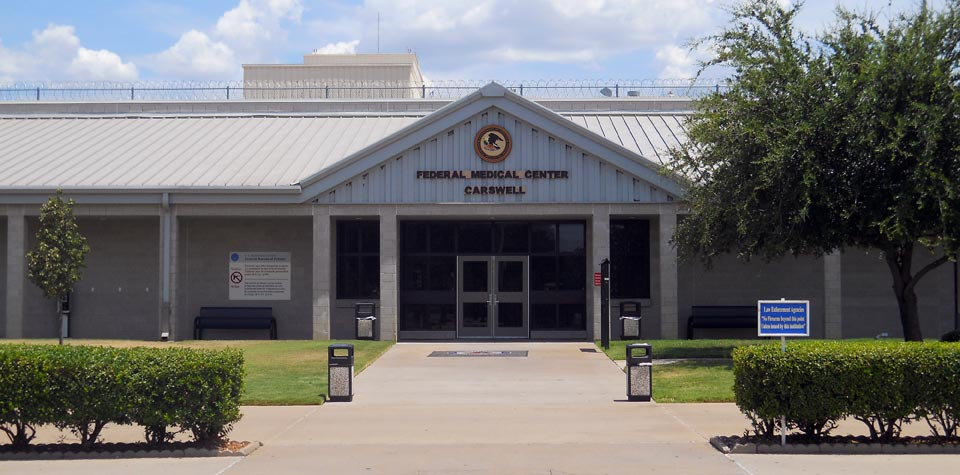
Federal Medical Center, Carswell, where Montgomery was incarcerated while on death row

Montgomery was charged with the federal offense of "kidnapping resulting in death", a crime established by the Federal Kidnapping Act of 1932, and described in Title 18 of the United States Code. Given the fact that the crime spanned two states (the baby was moved from Missouri to Kansas) it was brought to the federal level.

At a pre-trial hearing, a neuropsychologist testified that the head injuries Montgomery had sustained some years before could have damaged the part of the brain that controls aggression. During her trial in federal court, her defense attorneys, led by Frederick Duchardt, asserted that she had pseudocyesis, a mental condition that causes a woman to falsely believe she is pregnant and exhibit outward signs of pregnancy. According to The Guardian, Duchardt attempted to follow this line of defense only one week before the trial began after being forced to abandon a contradictory argument that Stinnett was murdered by Montgomery's brother Tommy, who had an alibi. As a result, Montgomery's family refused to co-operate with Duchardt and described her background to the jury.

Dr. V. S. Ramachandran and Dr. William Logan gave expert testimony that Montgomery had pseudocyesis in addition to depression, borderline personality disorder, and post-traumatic stress disorder. Ramachandran testified that Montgomery's stories about her actions fluctuated because of her delusional state; thus she was unable to describe the nature and quality of her acts. Both federal prosecutor Roseann Ketchmark and the opposing expert witness forensic psychiatrist Park Dietz disagreed strongly with the diagnosis of pseudocyesis.

On October 22, 2007, jurors found Montgomery guilty, rejecting the defense claim that Montgomery was delusional. On October 26, the jury recommended the death sentence. Judge Gary A. Fenner formally sentenced Montgomery to death on April 4, 2008.

Duchardt's pseudocyesis defense, Montgomery's past trauma and her separate diagnosis of mental illness were not fully revealed until after her conviction. This led critics including Guardian journalist David Rose to argue that Duchardt provided an incompetent legal defense for Montgomery. Fenner required Duchardt to be cross-examined in November 2016. Duchardt rejected all criticism and defended his conduct.

== Subsequent legal proceedings ==
On March 19, 2012, the U.S. Supreme Court denied Montgomery's certiorari petition. Montgomery, who was registered for the Federal Bureau of Prisons under number 11072-031, was incarcerated at Federal Medical Center, Carswell in Fort Worth, Texas, where she remained until she was transferred to the site of her execution. For the duration of her time there, she was the only woman on federal death row.

During her appeals, Montgomery's lawyers argued she technically did not commit the crime of kidnapping resulting in death, claiming that the baby was not considered a person until she was removed from her mother's womb. Accordingly, since Bobbi had died beforehand, the crime was instead a "death resulting in kidnapping." That claim was dismissed, with the courts saying the felony murder rule nullified this and that Montgomery needed to kill Bobbi regardless in order to complete the kidnapping.

Unspecified experts who examined Montgomery after conviction concluded that by the time of her crime she had long been living with psychosis, bipolar disorder, and post-traumatic stress disorders. She was said to be often disassociated from reality and to have permanent brain damage from numerous beatings at the hands of her parents and spouses.

== Execution ==
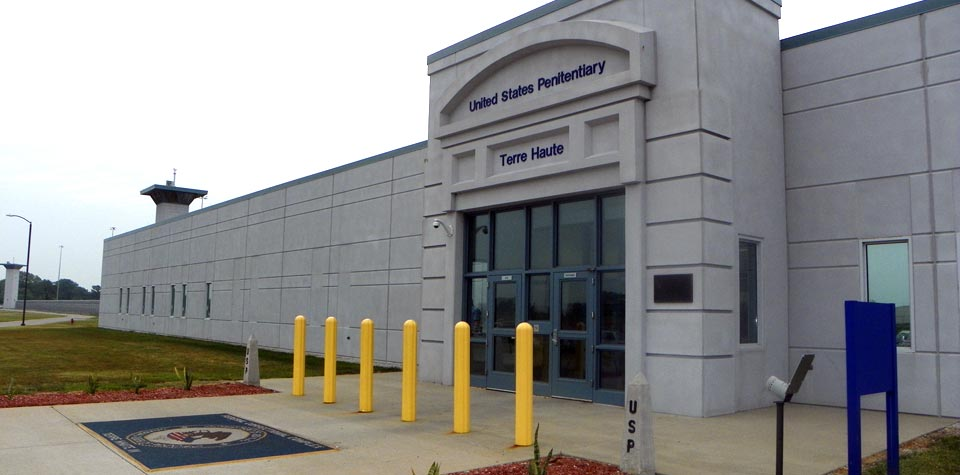
United States Penitentiary, Terre Haute, where Montgomery was executed

Montgomery was scheduled for execution on December 8, 2020, by lethal injection at the U.S. Penitentiary in Terre Haute, Indiana, but this was delayed following her attorneys contracting COVID-19. On December 23, 2020, Montgomery was given a new execution date of January 12, 2021. U.S. District Court Judge Randolph Moss found that "the director's order setting a new execution date while the Court's stay was in effect was 'not in accordance with law'", prohibiting the rescheduling of the execution before January 1, 2021.

On January 1, a three-judge panel on the U.S. Court of Appeals for the District of Columbia Circuit vacated Moss's ruling, effectively reinstating her execution date of January 12. On that date, U.S. District Judge Patrick Hanlon granted a stay of her execution on the grounds that her mental competence must first be tested as it could be argued she did not understand the grounds for her execution, per the Eighth Amendment to the U.S. Constitution. The stay was then vacated by the Supreme Court via a 6–3 vote. The execution was ordered to be carried out immediately. She arrived in the execution holding area in United States Penitentiary, Terre Haute, in Terre Haute, Indiana, on January 12.

Montgomery was executed by lethal injection on January 13, 2021, at USP Terre Haute. When asked if she had any last words, she replied: "No." She was pronounced dead at 1:31 a.m. EST.

Montgomery is the first female federal prisoner executed in 67 years, the 17th woman executed in the United States since 1976, the first woman executed in the United States since Kelly Gissendaner in 2015, and the first person executed in the United States in 2021. Only three other women have been executed by the U.S. federal government: Mary Surratt, a conspirator in the assassination of President Lincoln by hanging in 1865; Soviet spy Ethel Rosenberg by electric chair in 1953; and kidnapper Bonnie Heady by gas chamber, also in 1953.

In her final days, Montgomery had kept a calendar marked with Joe Biden's inauguration date: January 20, 2021. Joe Biden had promised to enact a moratorium on capital punishment at the federal level. Biden enacted the moratorium on July 1, 2021, after Montgomery's execution.

In 2023, one of Montgomery's attorneys admitted Montgomery's legal team had briefly considered taking her off the medications she was on to stabilize her mental health. The intent was for Montgomery to "go absolutely psychotic" in her team's attempt to postpone her execution by "proving mental fragility exacerbated by sexual abuse in childhood." The attorney stated, "Ultimately, we weren't going to do that to her."

== In literature ==
The case was described in author Diane Fanning's Baby Be Mine, and M. William Phelps's Murder in the Heartland. The case also helped inspire the novel Deliver Me by Elle Nash where a woman is morbidly obsessed with becoming pregnant.

The case featured in an episode of the true crime series Deadly Women titled "Fatal Obsession"; in an episode of the true crime series Solved titled "Life and Death"; and in the fifth episode of the documentary series No One Saw a Thing that aired on the Sundance Channel on August 29, 2019.

== See also ==
- Capital punishment by the United States federal government
- List of people executed by the United States federal government
- List of people executed in the United States in 2021
- List of women executed in the United States since 1976
- Branson Perry, Stinnett's cousin who disappeared about three years before her murder
- Murder of Reagan Simmons-Hancock

Executions carried out by the United States federal government
Preceded by Alfred Bourgeois December 11, 2020	Lisa Montgomery; January 13, 2021	Succeeded by Corey Johnson January 14, 2021
Executions carried out in the United States
Preceded by Alfred Bourgeois – Federal government December 11, 2020	Lisa Montgomery – Federal government January 13, 2021	Succeeded by Corey Johnson – Federal government January 14, 2021
Women executed in the United States
Preceded by Kelly Gissendaner – Georgia September 30, 2015	Lisa Montgomery – Federal government January 13, 2021	Succeeded by Amber McLaughlin – Missouri January 3, 2023
