= Harry N. MacLean =

American lawyer

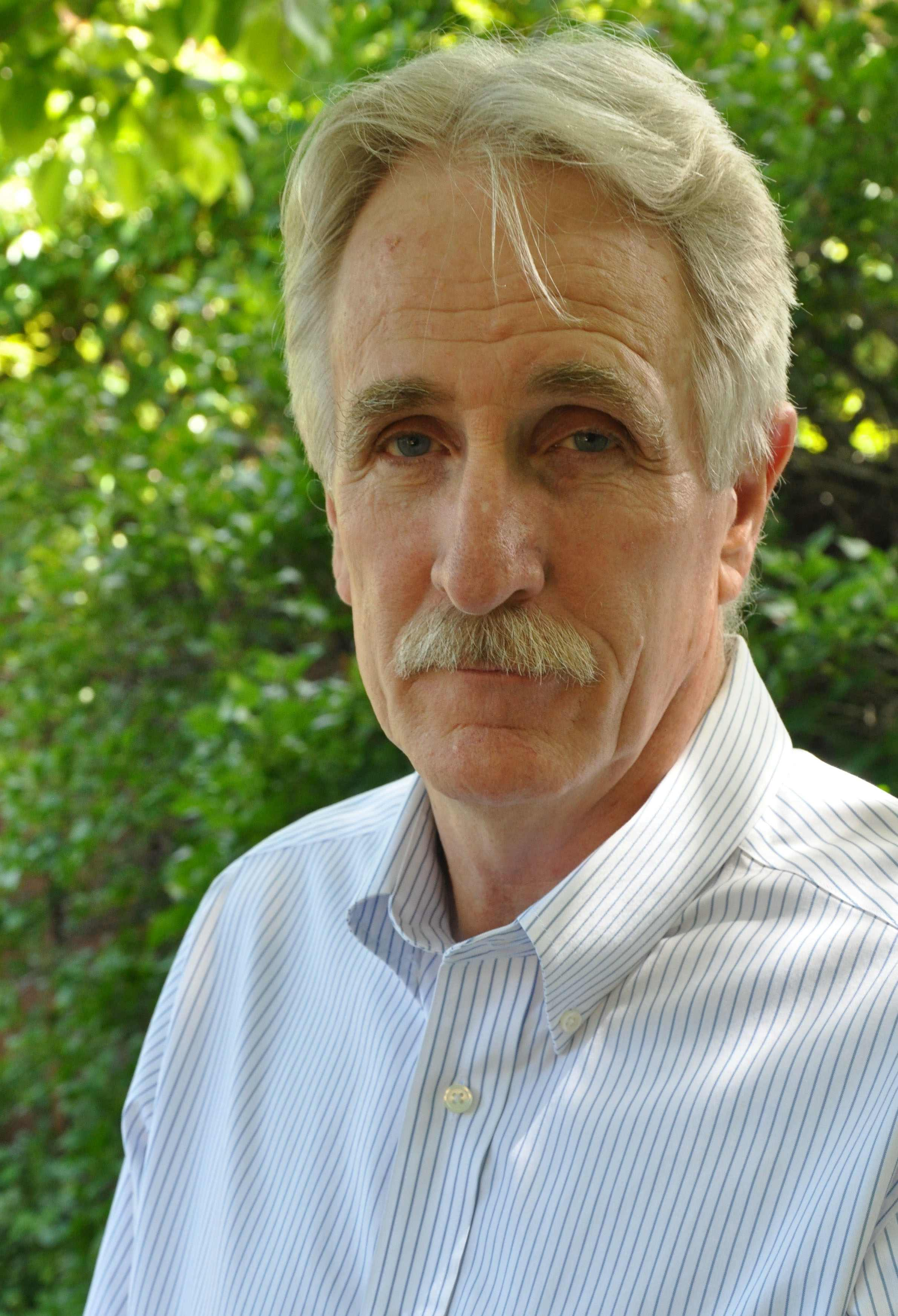
- Born: c. 1943
- Education: Lawrence University (BA); University of Denver
- Occupations: Writer; lawyer
- Writing career
- Genre: True crime

Harry MacLean (born c. 1943) is a writer and lawyer living in Denver, Colorado, who writes true crime books and won an Edgar Award for his book In Broad Daylight (1988).

== Early life ==
Maclean attended Shattuck St. Mary’s Preparatory School in Faribault, Minnesota. MacLean graduated in 1964 from Lawrence University with a B.A. in psychology. He received a law degree from the University of Denver College of Law in 1967. During the next few years he was a trial attorney for the Securities and Exchange Commission in Washington, D.C., an adjunct professor at Denver College of Law, magistrate in the Denver juvenile court, First Assistant Attorney General for the Colorado Department of Law, General Counsel of the Peace Corps. He was also an independent mediator and arbitrator.

== Books ==
His first book was In Broad Daylight (1988), an account of the "vigilante killing" of town bully Ken Rex McElroy in downtown Skidmore, Missouri in 1981. 50 people, many of whom had gathered earlier in the day to figure out a way to handle the situation with McElroy if he got off on assault charges from an earlier incident, were said to have been on the street near where McElroy was shot with a high-powered rifle and by a second assailant with a .22. However, the prosecutor said he could not bring a case because no townspeople would corroborate McElroy's wife's claim identifying the killer. In researching the book, MacLean lived with a family outside the town for three years. In Broad Daylight won an Edgar Award for best true crime writing, appeared on the New York Times bestseller list for twelve weeks peaking at number two, and was made into a 1991 movie starring Brian Dennehy. The book was reissued in 2007 with a new epilogue after Nodaway County prosecutor David Baird, who dealt with the case from the beginning, released the county's investigation file.

On July 10, 2012, the 31st anniversary of McElroy's killing, In Broad Daylight became available as an e-book.

MacLean's second book was Once Upon A Time, A True Story of Memory, Murder and the Law. Eileen Franklin-Lipsker, a California housewife, claimed to recover a repressed memory of her father murdering her playmate twenty years earlier in Foster City, California. Her father, George Thomas Franklin, was tried and convicted solely on the basis of the repressed memory. Franklin's conviction was later overturned by a federal court of appeals. The book was the basis for a recent four-part television series by Showtime entitled "Buried."

MacLean's book The Past is Never Dead: the Trial of James Ford Seale and Mississippi's Struggle for Redemption chronicles the 2007 trial of James Ford Seale for the murder of two black youths in southwest Mississippi in 1964. Seale was charged and convicted of torturing and drowning Charles Moore and Henry Dee in a backwater of the Mississippi River. The Past is Never Dead was nominated for the William Saroyan International Prize for Writing, awarded by Stanford University Libraries.

In 2013, MacLean wrote an account of his experience writing In Broad Daylight as an e-book titled The Story Behind In Broad Daylight. and as an addendum to his latest addition.

The Joy of Killing, published in 2015, was MacLean's first novel, sometimes described as a literary or psychological thriller. The Denver Post described it as "[a] dark, compelling literary work ... [that] marks the fictional debut of Denver true-crime writer MacLean. He combines an eerie night in a deserted house with the recollection of a teenage sexual encounter on a train, in a story that explores the lure of violence. The mystery repels and haunts."

MacLean's new book is Starkweather, The Untold Story Of The Killing Spree That Changed America. Published by Counterpoint Press, it will be available in hard cover, ebook and audible on November 28, 2023. MacLean tells the story of Charlie Starkweather and Caril Fugate (age 14)'s rampage through Nebraska and Wyoming in 1958, resulting in the death of 10 people. An in-depth presentation of the facts of the first mass murders in modern America, MacLean deals directly and for the first time with the issue of Fugate's guilt or innocence in the murders. He also describes the impact of the spree on the culture of America, including the movie Badlands, starring Martin Sheen as Starkweather and Sissy Spacek as Fugate, and Bruce Springsteen's album and song entitled Nebraska, which is the story of the rampage. MacLean, the same age as Fugate, grew up in Lincoln, the site of most of the murders and knew several of the victims of the rampage. He tells the story from the inside.
