= The Devil Next Door =

2019 documentary

- Genre: Crime; Documentary
- Directed by: Yossi Bloch; Daniel Sivan
- Composers: Eduardo Aram; Antônio Pinto
- Countries of origin: United States; International
- Original languages: English; Hebrew; Ukrainian; Yiddish; German
- No. of episodes: 5

Production
- Executive producers: Ben Braun; Dan Braun; Josh Braun; James Haygood; Lisa Janssen; Guy Lavie; Maya E. Rudolph; Dan Stern
- Production location: Israel
- Editor: Jesse Overman
- Running time: 3h 49min

Original release
- Network: Netflix
- Release: November 2019

The Devil Next Door is a documentary series about John Demjanjuk, accused of war crimes and crimes against humanity carried out while serving as a guard at Nazi extermination camps during World War II, who spent years living in Cleveland. The show premiered on Netflix in 2019.

== Summary ==
The documentary shows the legal battles of Demjanjuk, a retired autoworker in Cleveland accused of being a German-Nazi prison camp guard known as "Ivan the Terrible". Arrested, denaturalized as an American citizen and extradited to Israel in 1986, Demjanjuk was tried as a war criminal in a highly-publicized trial. Several survivors questioned at trial identified Demjanjuk as Ivan the Terrible. He was convicted in 1988 and sentenced to death, but his conviction was overturned by reasonable doubt, based in part on documents released after the Cold War that identified a different guard as Ivan the Terrible.

Although there was not enough evidence to identify Demjanjuk as Ivan the Terrible, he was identified as a Nazi guard at the Sobibor extermination camp and several other camps. He was deported from the United States to Germany in 2009 and was charged with over 27,900 counts of accessory to murder. He was again found guilty in May 2011 and sentenced to five years in prison. Demjanjuk died in prison while his case was on appeal and so the German legal system will no longer seek a determination on his guilt or innocence.

The documentary interviews several figures from the trial, including Demjanjuk's attorney and family members and Israeli and American prosecutors, journalists, and academics. It contains extensive footage from his first trial, including testimony from Holocaust survivors and archival footage from concentration camps.

== Cast ==
- John Demjanjuk.
- Eli Gabay, Israeli state prosecutor.
- Eli Rosenbaum, former director, Office of Special Investigations.
- Michael Shaked, Israeli state prosecutor.
- Yoram Sheftel, Israeli defense attorney.
- Lawrence Douglas, professor of law.
- Ted Henry, TV reporter.
- Ed Nishnic, Demjanjuk's son-in-law.
- Ed Nishnic Jr., Demjanjuk's grandson.
- Mark O'Connor, Demjanjuk's Defense Attorney.
- Zvi Tal, judge.
- Dalia Dorner, law professor and former Justice of the Supreme Court of Israel.
- Richard Rashke, historian.
- Tom Teicholz, Reporter, Author, The Trial of Ivan the Terrible.
- Tamir Hod, historian.
- Gary Holodnak, Demjanjuk's Supervisor at Ford.
- Eyal Megged, childhood friend.
- John Caniglia, reporter.
- Mark Demarino, radio reporter.
- Dov Eitan, Demjanjuk's appellate attorney.
- William Flynn, forensics expert.
- Elizabeth Holtzman, founder of the Office of Special Investigations.
- Noah Klieger, Israeli reporter.
- Michele Lesie, reporter.
- Joanne Lowe, courtroom sketch artist.
- Patricia Smith, facial recognition expert.

== Map of Poland controversy ==
Polish Prime Minister Mateusz Morawiecki criticized the documentary for including a modern-day map of Poland, with the location of Nazi death camps marked on it. Morawiecki considered that it implied that Poland was responsible for the death camps instead of Nazi Germany. The map was shown as part of a segment from a 1985 television report that first detailed the allegations against Demjanjuk. It was shown "repeatedly in various versions of the series", with no explanation that the camps were run by Germans. Morawiecki sent a letter to Netflix about the map, and Netflix agreed in November 2019 to "provide more information" onscreen to clearly show that the camps were operated by the Germans. Netflix was thanked by Morawiecki. Vanity Fair observed on November 15, 2019, that it was "unclear" when Netflix would add those clarifications.

== See also ==
- List of 2019 American television debuts
