= Hanukkah in television =

Hanukkah in television, the Jewish holiday of Hanukkah (which commemorates the victory of the Maccabees over the Greeks), is represented and referenced to in a number of television series of various genres such as comedy, sitcom, drama, documentary, animated, children's, competitive, talk and reality television, among others. Through a number of cultural references, tropes, and plot devices. Hanukkah has been referenced in many different American television series, as well as Israeli, British television, Canadian, and French television, among others.

Hanukkah plays a minor role in the plot of some episodes of television series, and plays a more important role as the main plot device in others, such as in "A Rugrats Chanukah", among others.

== Notable examples ==
- A Rugrats Chanukah

== See also ==
- Hanukkah films
