= M. William Phelps =

American crime writer and investigative journalist (born 1967)

- Born: Mathew William Phelps; February 1, 1967 (age 59); Hartford, Connecticut, U.S.
- Occupations: Investigative journalist; TV presenter; author; podcaster
- Writing career
- Period: 2000–present
- Genres: Nonfiction crime, history
- Subjects: Murder, serial killers, history
- Notable works: Paper Ghosts, Crossing the Line with M. William Phelps
- Notable awards: 2013 Excellence in Journalism—2015 Investigative Journalism Award
- Website: www.mwilliamphelps.com

M. William Phelps (born February 1, 1967) is an American crime writer and investigative journalist, podcaster, and TV presenter.

== Career ==
Phelps is the author of 39 fact-based nonfiction (true crime) books, two thrillers, and four history books, including co-authoring Failures of the Presidents with Thomas J. Craughwell. Phelps has written for The Providence Journal, the Hartford Courant and the New London Day, and consulted on the first season of the Showtime cable television series Dexter.

After his book Murder in the Heartland was released, Phelps went on Good Morning America to talk about the 2004 murder of Bobbie Jo Stinnett covered in his book about convicted killer Lisa Marie Montgomery.

Beginning in January 2012, he produced and hosted with criminal profiler John Kelly the Investigation Discovery series Dark Minds, which airs on the Investigation Discovery channel. The series features unsolved serial murders. When Phelps' book The Killing Kind was released in June 2014, Publishers Weekly wrote, "Fans of the author's Discovery TV series, 'Dark Minds,' will be rewarded."

He was featured in Writers Digest with his debut true-crime book Perfect Poison in 2003 and again with the release of his eighth book, I'll be Watching You, in 2009.

The New York Post in a February 2012 review called Phelps' book Never See Them Again, about Texas killer Christine Paolilla, a "riveting new book" that "examines one of the most horrific murders in recent American history." Kirkus Reviews called it a "thorough account of a quadruple murder in a Houston suburb in 2003."

Phelps' book Nathan Hale: The Life and Death of America's First Spy was listed as number 14 on The New York Times bestseller list in e-book nonfiction the week of May 11, 2014. Twilight actor Peter Facinelli in June 2014 acquired movie rights for his Nathan Hale book.

== Personal life ==
Phelps is divorced and a father. Phelps' sister-in-law was murdered in 1996, and the killer was never found. He now resides in Tolland County, Connecticut.

== Published works ==
=== True crime ===
- Perfect Poison (2003)
- Lethal Guardian (2004)
- Every Move You Make (2005)
- Murder in the Heartland (2006)
- Sleep in Heavenly Peace (2007)
- Because You Loved Me (2008)
- If Looks Could Kill (2008)
- I'll Be Watching You (2008)
- Cruel Death (2009)
- Deadly Secrets (2009)
- Death Trap (2010)
- Kill For Me (2010)
- The Devil's Rooming House (2010)
- Love Her To Death (2011)
- Too Young to Kill (2011)
- Never See Them Again (2012)
- Bad Girls (2013)
- Kiss of the She-Devil (2013)
- Obsessed (2014)
- The Killing Kind (2014)
- One Breath Away (2015)
- To Love And To Kill (2015)
- I'd Kill For You (2015)
- If You Only Knew (2016)
- Don't Tell A Soul (2017)
- Targeted (2017)
- Dangerous Ground (2017)
- Beautifully Cruel (2017)
- Where Monsters Hide (2019)
- We Thought We Knew You (2020)

=== History ===
- Failures of the Presidents: From the Whiskey Rebellion and War of 1812 to the Bay of Pigs and War in Iraq (2008) With Thomas J. Caughwell
- Nathan Hale: The Life and Death of America's First Spy (2008)
- The Devil's Right Hand: The Tragic Story of the Colt Family Curse (2011)
- Crimes of the Presidents (2013)

== Awards ==
- 2014: Society of Professional Journalists' Connecticut chapter, 2nd place, Investigative Reporting
- 2008: New England Book Festival Award for I'll Be Watching You
