= Mike Wallace Is Here =

2019 biographical documentary film by Avi Belkin

- Directed by: Avi Belkin
- Produced by: Rafael Marmor; Peggy Drexler; John Battsek; Avi Belkin; Chris Leggett
- Starring: Mike Wallace
- Edited by: Billy McMillin
- Production companies: Drexler Films; Delirio Films; Rock Paper Scissors Entertainment
- Release date: 27 January 2019 (2019 Sundance Film Festival)
- Country: United States
- Box office: $277,589

Mike Wallace Is Here is a 2019 biographical documentary film directed by Avi Belkin. It was produced by Rafael Marmor, Peggy Drexler, John Battsek, Avi Belkin, and Chris Leggett, under the banner of Drexler Films, Delirio Films and Rock Paper Scissors Entertainment. The film follows the life and career of American journalist Mike Wallace, using never-before-seen archival footage of the journalist preparing for and speaking about his work.

The film premiered on 27 January 2019 at the 2019 Sundance Film Festival, where it was nominated for Grand Jury Prize – Documentary. After the premiere, the film was nominated for Best Documentary at Sheffield Doc/Fest, Docaviv, and Cleveland International Film Festival. The film has received positive reviews from film critics, with review-aggregation websites Rotten Tomatoes and Metacritic giving a 94% and 73% of positive reviews, respectively.

== Synopsis ==
Mike Wallace Is Here follows the career of American journalist Mike Wallace. It depicts Wallace as he starts the show 60 Minutes and experiments with its format. He interviews celebrities including Bill O'Reilly, Donald Trump, Ruhollah Khomeini, and Oprah Winfrey, shown through archive footage of the show.

== Cast ==
- Mike Wallace as himself (archived footage)

Other appearances:

- Spiro Agnew
- Muhammad Ali
- Jonathan Alter
- Yassir Arafat
- Menachem Begin
- Jack Benny
- Thomas Hart Benton
- Emile Zola Berman
- Ben Bradlee
- Ed Bradley
- Tom Brokaw
- George Burns
- Sid Caesar
- Johnny Carson
- Dick Cavett
- Mickey Cohen
- Stephen Colbert
- Charles Colson
- Walter Cronkite
- Salvador Dalí
- Bette Davis
- Diana Dors
- Kirk Douglas
- Hugh Downs
- Eldon Edwards
- John Ehrlichman
- Oriana Fallaci
- Jimmy Fratianno
- Jackie Gleason
- Merv Griffin
- David Hartman
- Leona Helmsley
- Don Hewitt
- Vladimir Horowitz
- Alex Jones
- Jacqueline Kennedy
- John F. Kennedy
- Ayatollah Khomeini
- Larry King
- Martin Luther King Jr.
- Steve Kroft
- David Letterman
- G. Gordon Liddy
- Shirley MacLaine
- Groucho Marx
- John McCain
- Paul Meadlo
- Arthur Miller
- Marilyn Monroe
- Edward R. Murrow
- Richard Nixon
- Manuel Noriega
- Bill O'Reilly
- Drew Pearson
- Thomas P. Pike
- Maury Povich
- Vladimir Putin
- Dan Rather
- Ronald Reagan
- Harry Reasoner
- Geraldo Rivera
- Eleanor Roosevelt
- Lillian Roth
- Anwar Sadat
- Morley Safer
- Van Gordon Sauter
- Rod Serling
- Eric Sevareid
- Dinah Shore
- Beverly Sills
- Lesley Stahl
- Jon Stewart
- Barbra Streisand
- Donald Trump
- Chris Wallace
- George Wallace
- Barbara Walters
- William Westmoreland
- Jeffrey Wigand
- Oprah Winfrey
- Frank Lloyd Wright
- Malcolm X
- Xi Jinping

== Production ==
Director Avi Belkin told From the Grapevine: "I had this idea. I wanted to do a Mike Wallace interview with Mike Wallace. But Mike was obviously dead, so I had an idea of doing this through the archives". He approached CBS News, producer of 60 Minutes, which provided Belkin with more than 1,400 hours of archival footage, including "never-before-seen footage of Wallace prepping for interviews, chatting with colleagues and pontificating about his life's work". This was the first time CBS News had allowed someone to use their 60 Minutes archival footage. Belkin spent several months watching Wallace's interviews, writing down the ideas he had, and then spent about a year editing the film alongside Billy McMillin and his team.

Belkin said he did not plan to explore Wallace's personal life. He explained:

I knew the surface-level stuff about Mike. Meaning, he was this legendary newsman and tough interviewer. But that's it. So I really didn't expect to see so much depth to his personality. The fact that he was prone to depression. The fact that he was so insecure. That he lost his son in a tragic accident in Greece. That he tried to commit suicide. All of those things were amazing to discover. But it also made his character so much more compelling because you saw him overcome those difficulties in his life.

— Avi Belkin, Cinema76

The film title refers to the legendary fear that Wallace's name evoked in his interview subjects. According to Belkin, these were "the four most-dreaded words in the English language back then". The title also hints to the ongoing legacy that Wallace leaves with the viewing of this archival footage.

== Release ==
Mike Wallace Is Here premiered at the 2019 Sundance Film Festival on 27 January 2019. It was nominated for Grand Jury Prize – Documentary. The film had a special screening on 16 July 2019 in the United States.

=== Box office ===
In its opening weekend, Mike Wallace Is Here was screened in three theatres, grossing $19,437 with an average of $6,479 per theatre. In its second weekend, the film was screened in 21 theatres, grossing $49,129 with an average of $2,339 per theatre. In its third weekend, the film was screened in 32 theatres, grossing $38,550 with an average of $1,205 per theatre. In its fourth weekend, it grossed $51,935, with an average of $1,332 per theatre.

=== Critical reception ===
On review aggregator Rotten Tomatoes, the film holds an approval rating of 95% based on 91 reviews, and an average rating of 7.5/10. The website's critical consensus reads, "As solidly compelling as its subject's best reporting, Mike Wallace Is Here is a worthy tribute and an engrossing look at the changing landscape of modern news." Metacritic, which uses a weighted average, rated the film 73 out of 100 based on 22 critics, indicating "generally favorable reviews".

Richard Roeper of Chicago Sun-Times wrote: "This is a time capsule—an expertly crafted time capsule—of an astonishing career". Leah Pickett of Chicago Reader wrote: "Director Avi Belkin employs many creative strategies to reveal the inner workings of Mike Wallace, the formidable reporter best known for grilling celebrities and political dignitaries on 60 Minutes". Josh Modell of The A.V. Club wrote: 'To be blunt—which Wallace, who died in 2012, always was—Mike Wallace Is Here is fascinating but scattered, and never quite decides what its target should be". Amy Nicholson of Variety wrote: "As Belkin's brisk and compelling documentary fades to black, the director seems to hope that the Wallace quotation audiences cling to isn't one of his fanged questions, but his optimism for the profession to which he dedicated his life".

Lisa Jensen of Good Times criticised the film, writing that "Belkin never really discovers the man behind the public persona. Nor does he find (in what must have been hundreds of hours of footage) any particular 'aha!' moment with an interview subject that would cap Wallace's legacy". Norman Wilner of Now wrote: "Maybe that's Belkin's point: that contemporary journalism has settled for easily digestible, context-light sound bites rather than discourse or dialogue that's intended to find the inarguable truth of a thing". Nora Lee Mandel of Film-Forward wrote: "Director Avi Belkin's debut English-language feature documentary opens with its most intriguing setup and then takes a while to reach that insight again".

== Accolades ==
In 2019, the film won Video Source Award awarded by International Documentary Association. Mike Wallace Is Here received various nominations including, Grand Jury Prize – Documentary at Sundance Film Festival, and Sheffield International Documentary Festival. The film was also nominated for Best International Film at the Docaviv International Documentary Film Festival, Best Documentary at the Cleveland International Film Festival, Phoenix Award at Film Festival Cologne, Best Archival Documentary, and Best Biographical Documentary at the Critics' Choice Movie Award, and Outstanding Achievement in Editing at Cinema Eye Honors.

Year	Award	Category	Result	Ref(s).
2019	Sundance Film Festival	Grand Jury Prize – Documentary	Nominated	
2019	Sheffield International Documentary Festival	Grand Jury Award – Best Documentary	Nominated	
2019	Docaviv International Documentary Film Festival	Best International Film	Nominated	
2019	Cleveland International Film Festival	Best Documentary	Nominated	
2019	International Documentary Association	Video Source Award	Won	
2019	Film Festival Cologne	Phoenix Award	Nominated	
2019	Critics' Choice Movie Award for Best Documentary Feature	Best Archival Documentary	Nominated	
2019	Critics' Choice Movie Award for Best Documentary Feature	Best Biographical Documentary	Nominated	
2020	Cinema Eye Honors	Outstanding Achievement in Editing	Nominated	
