= Maradona in Mexico =

2019 documentary television miniseries

- Genre: Documentary; Comedy; Drama
- Directed by: Angus Macqueen
- Countries of origin: Argentina; United States; Mexico
- Original language: Spanish
- No. of seasons: 1
- No. of episodes: 7

Production
- Running time: 26-39 minutes

Original release
- Release: November 13, 2019

Maradona in Mexico is a 2019 documentary television series directed by Angus Macqueen and starring Diego Armando Maradona, Gilli Messer and Jarrod Pistilli. The premise is set in 2018-19 and revolves around the Argentinian soccer player Diego Maradona's coaching of Mexico's second division club Dorados de Sinaloa in Culiacán.

== Cast ==
- Diego Armando Maradona
- Gilli Messer
- Jarrod Pistilli

== Release ==
Maradona in Mexico was released on November 13, 2019, on Netflix.
