= Hanukkah film =

Film genre whose main subject matter is the Jewish holiday of Hanukkah

A Hanukkah film is a genre of film in which the main emphasis is on the celebration of the Jewish holiday of Hanukkah. Films in this style may incorporate the religious aspects of Hanukkah, such as lighting the menorah or the story of the Maccabees, along with cultural aspects of Hanukkah, such as spinning dreidels, or eating traditional foods such as latkes, sufganiyot, or gelt.

The Hanukkah film genre, such as it exists, is a reflection of the prevalence of Christmas films, as the two holidays are celebrated during a similar time of year. The most well known films of the genre tend to feature Christmas themed iconography and themes, and are often marketed to Christian audiences to be watched as a Christmas movie. This can be evidenced by the movie poster for Eight Crazy Nights which prominently features a Christmas tree, a reindeer, red and green Christmas lights and the tag line "The ultimate battle between naughty and nice", a reference to Santa's list.

Hanukkah has historically been more commonly portrayed in television, than in film, due to the relative lower financial risk and cost of production as compared to a feature film and minor importance of Hanukkah as a Jewish holiday.

== Notable examples of Hanukkah films ==
Some notable examples of films in this genre, as well as films featuring Hanukkah, are listed as follows.

=== An American Tail ===
An American Tail is a 1986 American animated musical comedy-drama adventure film directed by Don Bluth and produced by Sullivan Bluth Inc. and Amblin Entertainment. The film opens as the family is celebrating Hanukkah in Shostka, Ukraine in 1885, the Mousekewitzes, a Russian-Jewish family of mice who live with a human family named Moskowitz, are celebrating the holiday and Papa gives his hat to his 5-year-old son, Fievel, and tells him about the United States, a country where there are no cats. The celebration is interrupted when a battery of Cossacks ride through the village square in an anti-Jewish arson attack and their cats likewise attack the village mice. Because of this, the Moskowitz home, along with that of the Mousekewitzes, is destroyed, and the film tells the story of Fievel Mousekewitz and his family as they emigrate from the Imperial Russian territory of Ukraine to the United States for freedom. However, he gets lost and must find a way to reunite with them.

=== The Real Shlemiel ===
The Real Shlemiel, also Aaron's Magic Village (German: Die Schelme von Schelm) is a 1995 European-Israeli adventure-fantasy film. It was released in Germany and in the United States in 1997. The story takes place during Hanukkah and the celebration of Hanukkah is a central plot point of the film. The film is based on Stories for Children by Isaac Bashevis Singer.

The film's plot focuses on Aaron, a new arrival to the Polish village of Chelm, and his uncle Shlemiel. An evil sorcerer, Darko, steals from Chelm the magical "Book of Marvels" so that he can create a golem to destroy Chelm. It is up to Aaron and Shlemiel to save the day.

=== Eight Crazy Nights ===
Eight Crazy Nights is a 2002 American adult animated musical comedy-drama Hanukkah film directed by Seth Kearsley and produced, co-written by and starring Adam Sandler, in his first voice-acting role. The film is animated in the style of television holiday specials, and, unlike most mainstream holiday films, centers on Jewish characters during the Hanukkah season, as opposed to the Christian celebration of Christmas.

This is also Happy Madison Productions' first animated film. The film's title is taken from a line in Sandler's series of songs called "The Chanukah Song" that compares the gift-giving traditions of Christmas and Chanukah: "Instead of one day of presents, we get eight crazy nights!". Additionally, a new version of The Chanukah Song was played over the film's closing credits. It has been called the best known Hanukkah film.

=== The Hebrew Hammer ===
The Hebrew Hammer is a 2003 American comedy Hanukkah film written and directed by Jonathan Kesselman. It stars Adam Goldberg, Judy Greer, Andy Dick, Mario Van Peebles, and Peter Coyote. The plot concerns a Jewish blaxploitation crime fighter known as the Hebrew Hammer who must save Hanukkah from the evil son of Santa Claus, who wants to destroy Hanukkah and Kwanzaa and make everyone celebrate Christmas.

=== Full-Court Miracle ===
Full-Court Miracle is a 2003 Disney Channel Original Hanukkah Movie. It premiered on November 21, 2003. Inspired by the true story of University of Virginia Cavaliers basketball star Lamont Carr, the film centers on a group of young Jewish basketball players during the Hanukkah season who are determined to find their own Judah Macabee to coach their team and help their team out of a slump. The main character Alex Schlotsky is inspired by the true story of Chad Korpeck and Alex Barbag. The film makes numerous references to the miracle of the oil, with the school's electricity staying on even though it was being powered by a gas generator with only enough fuel for one hour instead of the eight hours the game lasted. The film concludes with Rabbi Lewis (a fictional character in the film) telling the story of Hanukkah and its relation to the basketball game plays over the scene.

=== Call Me by Your Name ===
Call Me by Your Name (Italian: Chiamami col tuo nome) is a 2017 coming-of-age romantic drama film directed by Luca Guadagnino. Its screenplay, by James Ivory, who also co-produced, is based on the 2007 eponymous novel by André Aciman. The film is the final installment in Guadagnino's thematic "Desire" trilogy, after I Am Love (2009), and A Bigger Splash (2015). Set in 1983 in northern Italy, Call Me by Your Name chronicles the romantic relationship between a 17-year-old, Elio Perlman (Timothée Chalamet), and Oliver (Armie Hammer), a 24-year-old graduate-student assistant to Elio's father Samuel (Michael Stuhlbarg), an archaeology professor. The two develop a rapport and bond over music, their shared Jewish identities, and their attraction to each other. What lands this romantic coming-of-age flick on this list is the film's epilogue. Months after the intense romance has blossomed and run its course, Elio receives a phone call from Oliver, where he announces to Elio's family that he has just gotten engaged. Still harboring passionate feelings for Oliver, Elio walks into the dining room and stares at the roaring fire in the fireplace as his parents set the table for their dinner on the last night of Hanukkah. The film also stars actresses Amira Casar, Esther Garrel, and Victoire Du Bois.

=== Hanukkah ===
Hanukkah is a 2019 horror film written and directed by Eben McGarr. Father and son serial killers (played by the late Sid Haig as Judah Lazarus and Joe Knetter as Obediah Lazarus) who believe God has sent them the commandment to kill anyone who would harm Jews or Jews who fail to properly practice their faith. Horrifyingly, after the psychotic killer hunts and kills his victim, he leaves behind a Star of David inscription in the body of his dead victims. The killer lights another candle in the menorah for each kill he makes in this "Festival of Frights". The film is one of the few Jewish horror films and is probably the first Hanukkah horror film, making it a notable entry in the horror genre.

=== Love, Lights, Hanukkah! ===
Love, Lights, Hanukkah! is a 2020 Hallmark romantic comedy directed by Mark Jean and written by Karen Berger. Christina Rossi (played by Mia Kirshner) takes a DNA test that reveals that she is unexpectedly 50% Jewish. Eager to learn about her Jewish culture, Christina meets her birth mother Ruth Berman (played by Marilu Henner) and discovers the joys of latkes, menorahs, and kugel and an unexpected romance with David Singer (played by Ben Savage). The film was acknowledged by Insider as Hallmark's first genuine Hanukkah film.

== See also ==
- Hanukkah in television
- Hanukkah
