= Skidmore, Missouri =

City in Nodaway County, Missouri, United States

- City
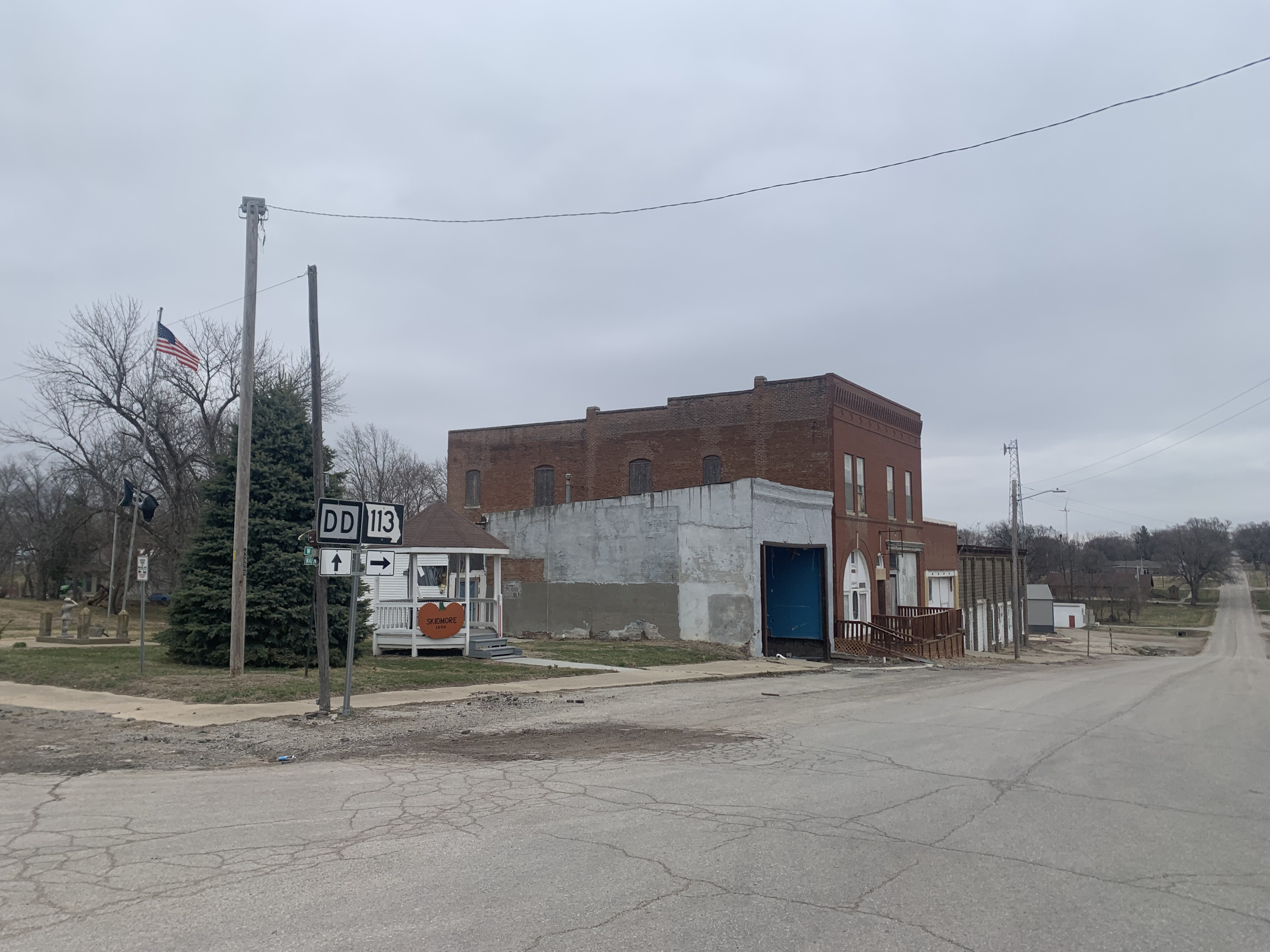
- Skidmore Missouri at corner of Missouri Route 113 and Missouri Route DD, facing northeast

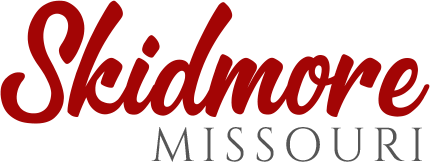
- Wordmark

- Location within Nodaway County and Missouri
- Coordinates: 40°17′16″N 95°04′46″W
- Country: United States
- State: Missouri
- County: Nodaway
- Township: Monroe
- Platted: 1880

Government
  - Mayor: Teresa Carter

Area
  - Total: 0.33 sq mi (0.85 km^{2})
  - Land: 0.33 sq mi (0.85 km^{2})
  - Water: 0 sq mi (0.00 km^{2})
- Elevation: 929 ft (283 m)

Population (2020)
  - Total: 245
  - Density: 742.8/sq mi (286.79/km^{2})
- Time zone: UTC-6 (Central (CST))
  - Summer (DST): UTC-5 (CDT)
- ZIP code: 64487
- Area code: 660
- FIPS code: 29-68132
- GNIS feature ID: 2395893
- Website: skidmoremo.org

Skidmore is a city in western Nodaway County, Missouri, United States. The population was 245 according to the 2020 Census.

== History ==
The Skidmore area was first settled in 1840 by William Bunton shortly after the Platte Purchase opened the area to settlement. Skidmore itself was platted in 1880 when M. Skidmore donated 20 acres (81,000 m^{2}) to the Nodaway Valley Railroad Company (the agent for the Kansas City, St. Joseph and Council Bluffs Railroad which was eventually taken over by the Burlington Northern Railroad). It was previously known as Union Valley.

== Crime ==
On July 10, 1981, Ken McElroy was shot to death with at least two different guns while sitting in his truck in front of the D&G Tavern in town. Up to 50 individuals witnessed the event, all of whom denied seeing anything that would help police identify any of the shooters. McElroy's wife saw one of the gunmen and identified him. The prosecutor took the case to two grand juries, but neither one thought any crime had been committed so there was no indictment. As of 2026, the murder has not been solved and still is considered an open case. McElroy had a reputation as the "town bully," and he had fended off over 20 charges for acts of theft, rape, and other violence (often by means of witness intimidation). In the months before his death, he was appealing a light sentence for shooting a 70-year-old grocer, Bo Bowenkamp, in the neck. Town residents had been upset over the inability of the courts to deal with him. Author Harry N. MacLean recounted the incident and its background in a bestselling and award-winning book, In Broad Daylight. In 1991 the incident was portrayed in a made-for-TV movie starring Brian Dennehy and Cloris Leachman (although filmed in Texas). The Ken McElroy shooting was also the focus of the A&E Network program City Confidential, season 2, episode 22 entitled, "Skidmore: Frontier Justice".

On October 16, 2000, Greg N. Dragoo beat and dragged his girlfriend, Wendy Gillenwater, down several country roads outside of Skidmore, causing her to die. Gillenwater's body was found outside her Skidmore home. Dragoo was convicted of second degree murder and sentenced to life in prison with the possibility of parole by a Nodaway County judge. Dragoo is currently incarcerated in the Jefferson City Correctional Center.

On April 11, 2001, Branson Perry vanished under mysterious circumstances from his residence at 304 West Oak Street in Skidmore. Perry's grandmother, Jo Ann, stopped by his home and found the house unlocked and deserted. She found this unusual and called the residence periodically over the next several days, but got no answer. Upon calling Perry's mother, Rebecca Klino, she found she had not spoken to him either. Ground search parties were organized by Nodaway County Sheriff's Office within a 15-mile (24 km) radius of the Perry residence. Numerous fields, farms, and abandoned buildings were searched, but the efforts proved fruitless. His disappearance received national media coverage. Over the following month and a half, over one hundred people were interviewed in Perry's disappearance, but the case remains unsolved. On August 14, 2022, Nodaway County Sheriff Randy Strong announced their department had identified a suspect, but still needed more evidence before making an arrest.

On December 16, 2004, Skidmore was once again the focus of national attention when Bobbie Jo Stinnett, a cousin of Branson Perry, was murdered in her home located at 410 W. Elm Street. She had her unborn baby cut from her womb, which was found alive two days later in Topeka, Kansas, and delivered to the father by police. The killer, Lisa Montgomery, received a federal death sentence, and was executed early in the morning on January 13, 2021.

== Geography ==
Skidmore is located on Missouri Route 113 approximately two miles north of the Nodaway-Holt county line. The Nodaway River flows past the west side and the confluence of Florida Creek with the Nodaway is just north of the community. The county seat Maryville is approximately eleven miles to the east-northeast.

According to the United States Census Bureau, the city has a total area of 0.33 square miles (0.85 km^{2}), all land. The elevation of 283 metres (928 ft) makes it the lowest elevation settlement in Nodaway County.

== Demographics ==
Historical population
Census	Pop.	Note	%±
1900	561		—
1910	562		0.2%
1920	528		−6.0%
1930	538		1.9%
1940	498		−7.4%
1950	485		−2.6%
1960	425		−12.4%
1970	440		3.5%
1980	437		−0.7%
1990	404		−7.6%
2000	342		−15.3%
2010	284		−17.0%
2020	245		−13.7%
U.S. Decennial Census

=== 2020 census ===
The 2020 United States census counted 245 people, 95 households, and 45 families in Skidmore. The population density was 742.4 per square mile (288.2/km^{2}). There were 165 housing units at an average density of 500.0 per square mile (194.1/km^{2}). The racial makeup was 92.24% (226) white, 0.0% (0) black or African-American, 0.0% (0) Native American, 0.41% (1) Asian, 0.0% (0) Pacific Islander, 0.41% (1) from other races, and 6.94% (17) from two or more races. Hispanic or Latino of any race was 0.5% (1) of the population.

Of the 95 households, 17.9% had children under the age of 18; 36.8% were married couples living together; 47.4% had a female householder with no husband present. Of all households, 50.5% consisted of individuals and 24.2% had someone living alone who was 65 years of age or older. The average household size was 2.0 and the average family size was 3.0.

14.7% of the population was under the age of 18, 6.1% from 18 to 24, 17.6% from 25 to 44, 21.2% from 45 to 64, and 16.7% who were 65 years of age or older. The median age was 44.5 years. For every 100 females, the population had 68.5 males. For every 100 females ages 18 and older, there were 69.7 males.

The 2016–2020 5-year American Community Survey estimates show that the median household income was $35,446 (with a margin of error of +/- $4,465) and the median family income was $60,938 (+/- $14,913). Males had a median income of $30,833 (+/- $20,048) versus $28,333 (+/- $5,179) for females. The median income for those above 16 years old was $29,063 (+/- $4,497). Approximately, 6.7% of families and 24.7% of the population were below the poverty line, including 31.4% of those under the age of 18 and 34.1% of those ages 65 or over.

=== 2010 census ===
As of the census of 2010, there were 284 people, 122 households, and 81 families living in the city. The population density was 860.6 inhabitants per square mile (332.3/km^{2}). There were 172 housing units at an average density of 521.2 per square mile (201.2/km^{2}). The racial makeup of the city was 99.3% White, 0.4% Native American, and 0.4% from two or more races.

There were 122 households, of which 29.5% had children under the age of 18 living with them, 52.5% were married couples living together, 8.2% had a female householder with no husband present, 5.7% had a male householder with no wife present, and 33.6% were non-families. 27.9% of all households were made up of individuals, and 13.9% had someone living alone who was 65 years of age or older. The average household size was 2.33 and the average family size was 2.80.

The median age in the city was 45.4 years. 21.8% of residents were under the age of 18; 5.6% were between the ages of 18 and 24; 21.7% were from 25 to 44; 32.1% were from 45 to 64; and 18.7% were 65 years of age or older. The gender makeup of the city was 52.8% male and 47.2% female.

=== 2000 census ===
As of the census of 2000, there were 342 people, 148 households, and 96 families living in the city. The population density was 1,058.8 inhabitants per square mile (408.8/km^{2}). There were 173 housing units at an average density of 535.6 per square mile (206.8/km^{2}). The racial makeup of the city was 99.42% White, 0.29% African American, and 0.29% from two or more races.

There were 148 households, out of which 29.7% had children under the age of 18 living with them, 52.0% were married couples living together, 7.4% had a female householder with no husband present, and 35.1% were non-families. 31.8% of all households were made up of individuals, and 12.8% had someone living alone who was 65 years of age or older. The average household size was 2.31 and the average family size was 2.89.

In the city the population was spread out, with 23.7% under the age of 18, 7.9% from 18 to 24, 26.9% from 25 to 44, 25.7% from 45 to 64, and 15.8% who were 65 years of age or older. The median age was 40 years. For every 100 females there were 102.4 males. For every 100 females age 18 and over, there were 94.8 males.

The median income for a household in the city was $30,500, and the median income for a family was $36,250. Males had a median income of $27,500 versus $20,156 for females. The per capita income for the city was $13,881. About 14.7% of families and 22.1% of the population were below the poverty line, including 36.8% of those under age 18 and 10.9% of those age 65 or over.

== Education ==
Nodaway-Holt R-VII School District is the local school district for the area, with an elementary school in Maitland and a junior-senior high and district headquarters in Graham.

== Notable people ==
- Ken McElroy - Town bully whose murder sparked an FBI investigation
- Branson Perry - A missing person whose case is unsolved
- Bobbie Jo Stinnet - Murdered for her baby, which was cut from her womb after death

== See also ==
- List of cities in Missouri
