= Love & Listings =

American reality television series (2019–2020)

- Genre: Reality television
- Created by: Tai Savet
- Starring: Jacob Knight; Samantha Barrett; Erik Miles; Taylor Schwartz; Ajani Scott; Alexandre Anu; Sarah Scheper; Andrew Clinkscale; Devon True; Katrina Jackson; Amber Rose; Vivica Fox; Safaree Samuels; Brandy Norwood; Ray J; Laz Alonso; Sean Kingston; Ashanti; Nick Young; Mack Wilds; Keri Hilson; Jordin Sparks; Michael Blackson; Michelle Williams; Vanessa Simmons; Jermaine Dupri; Rodger Saffold; Joe Haden; James Anderson; Asia Saffold; Diamond Icegirl; Juliet Zacarias; Loni Love; NLE Choppa; James E Welsh; Shalonda Crawford
- Country of origin: United States
- Original language: English
- No. of seasons: 2
- No. of episodes: 18

Production
- Executive producers: Tai Savet; Sean Matthews; Tara Long; Mark Ford; Kevin Lopez; Nate Green; Matt Anderson; Holly Carter; Christopher Costine; Lilly Neumeyer; Paula Aranda; Jennifer Arguirre; Fernando Mills; Todd Radnitz
- Running time: 42–48 minutes
- Production companies: Entertainment One EOne; Creature Films; Purveyors of Pop; Releve Entertainment (s. 1)

Original release
- Network: VH1
- Release: July 19, 2019 – August 30, 2020

Love & Listings is an American reality television series that aired on VH1 from July 19, 2019, to August 30, 2020, spanning two seasons. The show was created by real estate agent Tai Savet and follows Suge Knight's son, Jacob Knight, as he navigates the luxury real estate world of Los Angeles and more.
