= In Broad Daylight (1991 film) =

1991 film by James Steven Sadwith

- Genre: Drama; Thriller
- Based on: In Broad Daylight by Harry N. MacLean
- Screenplay by: William Hanley
- Directed by: James Steven Sadwith
- Starring: Brian Dennehy; Cloris Leachman; Marcia Gay Harden; Chris Cooper; John Anderson; Ken Jenkins
- Theme music composer: Patrick Williams
- Country of origin: United States
- Original language: English

Production
- Executive producers: John F. Roach; Freyda Rothstein
- Producers: Michael Biber; Jeffrey C. Hogue
- Production locations: Elgin, Texas; Bastrop, Texas
- Cinematography: Robert Draper
- Editor: Scott Vickey
- Running time: 90 minutes
- Production company: Force Ten Productions

Original release
- Network: NBC
- Release: February 3, 1991

In Broad Daylight is a 1991 American made-for-television thriller drama film about the life of Ken McElroy, the town bully of Skidmore, Missouri who became known for his unsolved murder. McElroy was fictionalized as the character Len Rowan, portrayed by Brian Dennehy. The film is based on Harry N. MacLean's nonfiction book of the same name.

== Plot ==
Based on the true events in Skidmore, Missouri in 1981, the film centers around the town dealing with violent bully Len Rowan (Brian Dennehy). After a confrontation at a local grocery, Rowan begins stalking the owner Ruth Westerman (Cloris Leachman) and her husband Wes. The harassment culminates with Rowan's shooting Wes and claiming self defense, while standing trial. Through a series of legal maneuvers, Rowan prolongs his freedom for over a year, all the while continuing to harass anyone in the town whom he feels is a threat—including police. After he violates the orders of his appeal, the town decides to meet and figure out how to deal with him.

== Cast ==
- Brian Dennehy as Len Rowan
- Cloris Leachman as Ruth Westerman
- Marcia Gay Harden as Adina Rowan
- Chris Cooper as Jack Wilson
- John Anderson as Wes Westerman
- Ken Jenkins as Bob Webb
- Robert Schenkkan as Rev. Don Douglas
- David Neidorf as Marshall Paul Harris
- Tony Frank as Sheriff Phil Lewis
- Bill Thurman as Virgil Teague
- Brandon Smith as Todd Lacey
- Colleen Keegan as Darlene Rowan
- Bill Bolender as Frank Snow
- Greta Muller as Madge Summers
- Dedra London as Cindy Rowan
- Tommy Townsend as Bill Hart
- Miles Mutchler as Hank Davis
- Matthew Posey as Mayor Dan Austen
- Jack Gould as Judge Freeman
- Shawn Toovey as Claude Rowan
- Rachel Duncan as Paulette Rowan
- Blue Deckart as Ray Dennis
- Anne Apa as Emma Rowan
- Seth Kaplan as Clint Webb
- Chris Bommo as Dexter Webb

== Home media ==
The film was released on VHS in Canada and the UK, and on laserdisc for Asian markets. It remains unreleased on DVD.
