= In Broad Daylight (book) =

1988 true crime book by Harry N. MacLean

- Author: Harry N. MacLean
- Language: English
- Genre: True crime
- Published: 1988 Harper and Row; 2012 Crime Rant Classics (e-book with updates)
- Publication place: United States
- Media type: Print and e-book
- Pages: 342 (print); 428 (e-book)
- ISBN: 0-06-015876-X
- OCLC: 17652068
- Dewey Decimal: 364.1/5/09778124
- LC Class: HV6534.S55 M33 1988

In Broad Daylight is a 1988 true crime book by award-winning writer Harry N. MacLean, detailing the killing of town bully Ken Rex McElroy in 1981 in Skidmore, Missouri. The book won an Edgar Award for best true crime writing in 1989, was a New York Times bestseller for 12 weeks (charting at number 2) and was adapted into a television movie of the same name. The book was reissued in 2007 by St. Martin's Press with a new epilogue.
