= 2021–22 United States network television schedule =

Television schedule for the fall of 2021

The 2021–22 network television schedule for the five major English-language commercial broadcast networks that air in the United States covers the prime time hours from September 2021 to August 2022. The schedule is followed by a list per network of returning series, new series, and series canceled after the 2020–21 television season.

NBC was the first to announce its fall schedule on May 14, 2021, followed by Fox on May 17, ABC on May 18, CBS on May 19, and The CW on May 25, 2021.

Beginning this season, The CW began to air primetime programming on Saturday nights, marking the first time the network aired primetime programming seven nights a week, nearly thirty years after Fox had expanded to its own nightly schedule in 1993. Coincidentally, both networks gained sports programming soon after.

PBS is not included, as member television stations have local flexibility over most of their schedules and broadcast times for network shows may vary. Ion Television and MyNetworkTV are also not included since both networks' schedules feature syndicated reruns (with limited original programming).

New series are highlighted in bold.

Note: From February 3 to 20, 2022, all NBC primetime programming was pre-empted for the coverage of the 2022 Winter Olympics in Beijing, China.

All times are U.S. Eastern and Pacific Time (except for some live sports or events). Subtract one hour for Central, Mountain, Alaska, and Hawaii–Aleutian times.

Each of the 30 highest-rated shows is listed with its rank and rating as determined by Nielsen Media Research.

== Legend ==
- Light blue indicates local programming.
- Gray indicates encore programming.
- Blue-gray indicates news programming.
- Light green indicates sporting events.
- Red indicates series being burned off and other irregularly scheduled programs, including specials and movies.
- Light gold indicates programming produced outside of the United States.
- highlight Yellow highlights indicates the top-10 most watched programs of the season.
- highlight Cyan highlights indicates numbers 11-20 most watched programs of the season.
- highlight Magenta highlights indicates numbers 21-30 most watched programs of the season.
- highlight Highlights indicates that it falls in multiple of the above categories.

== Sunday ==
Network		7:00 p.m.	7:30 p.m.	8:00 p.m.	8:30 p.m.	9:00 p.m.	9:30 p.m.	10:00 p.m.	10:30 p.m.
ABC	Fall	America's Funniest Home Videos		Celebrity Wheel of Fortune		Supermarket Sweep		The Rookie	
ABC	Winter	America's Funniest Home Videos		American Idol (23/7.29)				The Rookie	
ABC	Spring	America's Funniest Home Videos		Celebrity Family Feud (R)				The $100,000 Pyramid	
ABC	Summer	America's Funniest Home Videos		Celebrity Family Feud		**The Final Straw**		The $100,000 Pyramid	
ABC	Mid-summer	America's Funniest Home Videos		Celebrity Family Feud		The $100,000 Pyramid		**The Final Straw**	
CBS	Fall	NFL on CBS (4:25 p.m.)	60 Minutes (9/9.19)		The Equalizer (7/9.42)		NCIS: Los Angeles (24/7.28)		SEAL Team (continued until 11:30 p.m.)
CBS	Winter	60 Minutes (9/9.19)		The Equalizer (7/9.42)		NCIS: Los Angeles (24/7.28)		S.W.A.T.	
CBS	Mid-winter	60 Minutes (9/9.19)		Celebrity Big Brother		The Equalizer (R)		S.W.A.T.	
CBS	Late winter	60 Minutes (9/9.19)		The Equalizer (7/9.42)		NCIS: Los Angeles (24/7.28)		S.W.A.T.	
CBS	Spring	60 Minutes (9/9.19)				The Equalizer (R)		NCIS: Los Angeles (R)	
CBS	Summer	60 Minutes (9/9.19)		Big Brother		The Equalizer (R)		NCIS: Los Angeles (R)	
The CW	Fall	Local programming		Legends of the Hidden Temple		Masters of Illusion (R)		Local programming	
The CW	Winter	Local programming		**March** (R)		Two Sentence Horror Stories		Local programming	
The CW	Late winter	Local programming		Riverdale		**March**		Local programming	
The CW	Spring	Local programming		Riverdale		Whose Line Is It Anyway? (R)	**Would I Lie to You? (USA)** (R)	Local programming	
The CW	Summer	Local programming		Riverdale		Penn & Teller: Fool Us (R)		Local programming	
The CW	Mid-summer	Local programming		World's Funniest Animals (R)		Penn & Teller: Fool Us (R)		Local programming	
Fox	Fall	Fox NFL (4:25 p.m.)	The OT	The Simpsons	The Great North	Bob's Burgers	Family Guy	Local programming	
Fox	Winter	The Simpsons (R)	Call Me Kat (R)	The Simpsons	The Great North	Bob's Burgers	Family Guy	Local programming	
Fox	Spring	The Simpsons (R)	Duncanville	The Simpsons	The Great North	Bob's Burgers	Family Guy	Local programming	
Fox	Summer	MasterChef (R)		The Simpsons	Bob's Burgers (R)	Duncanville	Family Guy	Local programming	
Fox	Mid-summer	Beat Shazam (R)		The Simpsons	The Great North (R)	Bob's Burgers (R)	Family Guy	Local programming	
NBC	Fall	Football Night in America		NBC Sunday Night Football (8:20 p.m.) (1/18.00)					
NBC	Winter	NBC Sports programming							
NBC	Late winter	**America's Got Talent: Extreme** (R)		**The Courtship**		Weakest Link		Transplant	
NBC	Spring	**American Song Contest** (R)				Weakest Link		Transplant	
NBC	Late spring	Weakest Link (R)		**Dancing with Myself** (R)		America's Got Talent (R)			
NBC	Summer	Who Do You Think You Are?		Various programming		America's Got Talent (R)			
NBC	Late summer	**Password** (R)				America's Got Talent (R)			

== Monday ==
Network		8:00 p.m.	8:30 p.m.	9:00 p.m.	9:30 p.m.	10:00 p.m.	10:30 p.m.
ABC	Fall	Dancing with the Stars				The Good Doctor (29/6.80) (Tied with CSI: Vegas)	
ABC	Late fall	Monday Night Countdown	Monday Night Football (8:15 p.m.)				
ABC	Winter	The Bachelor				**Promised Land**	
ABC	Late winter	The Bachelor				The Good Doctor (29/6.80) (Tied with CSI: Vegas)	
ABC	Spring	American Idol (26/6.99)				The Good Doctor (29/6.80) (Tied with CSI: Vegas)	
ABC	Mid-spring	The Wonderful World of Disney				Various programming	
ABC	Late spring	ESPN on ABC sports programming					
ABC	Summer	The Bachelorette				**Claim to Fame**	
CBS	Fall	The Neighborhood	Bob Hearts Abishola	NCIS (3/10.90)		**NCIS: Hawaiʻi** (14/8.28)	
CBS	Winter	The Neighborhood	Bob Hearts Abishola	Celebrity Big Brother		**NCIS: Hawaiʻi** (14/8.28)	
CBS	Late winter	The Neighborhood	Bob Hearts Abishola	NCIS (3/10.90)		**NCIS: Hawaiʻi** (14/8.28)	
The CW	Fall	All American		**4400**		Local programming	
The CW	Winter	**March**		**4400**		Local programming	
The CW	Late winter	All American		**All American: Homecoming**		Local programming	
The CW	Spring	Roswell, New Mexico		In the Dark		Local programming	
The CW	Summer	Mysteries Decoded (R)		Penn & Teller: Fool Us (R)		Local programming	
Fox	Fall	9-1-1 (25/7.27)		**The Big Leap**		Local programming	
Fox	Winter	9-1-1: Lone Star (27/6.88)		**The Cleaning Lady**		Local programming	
Fox	Spring	9-1-1 (25/7.27)		9-1-1: Lone Star (27/6.88)		Local programming	
Fox	Late spring	Don't Forget the Lyrics!		Beat Shazam		Local programming	
NBC	Fall	The Voice (16/8.12)				**Ordinary Joe**	
NBC	Winter	Kenan		**That's My Jam**		**Ordinary Joe**	
NBC	Late winter	**America's Got Talent: Extreme**				**The Endgame**	
NBC	Spring	**American Song Contest**				**The Endgame**	
NBC	Late spring	American Ninja Warrior				Weakest Link (R)	

== Tuesday ==
Network		8:00 p.m.	8:30 p.m.	9:00 p.m.	9:30 p.m.	10:00 p.m.	10:30 p.m.
ABC	Fall	The Bachelorette				**Queens**	
ABC	Winter	**Judge Steve Harvey**		**Abbott Elementary**	Black-ish	**Queens**	
ABC	Mid-winter	**Jeopardy! National College Championship**		**Abbott Elementary**	Black-ish	To Tell the Truth	
ABC	Late winter	The Bachelor				To Tell the Truth	
ABC	Spring	**Judge Steve Harvey**		**Abbott Elementary**	Black-ish	To Tell the Truth	
ABC	Late spring	Holey Moley		The Chase		**Who Do You Believe?**	
ABC	Summer	Celebrity Wheel of Fortune (R)		**Generation Gap** (R)		Celebrity Family Feud (R)	
ABC	Late summer	The Bachelorette				Celebrity Family Feud (R)	
CBS		FBI (4/10.29)		**FBI: International** (15/8.21)		FBI: Most Wanted (12/8.72)	
The CW	Fall	The Flash		Riverdale		Local programming	
The CW	Winter	Superman & Lois		**Naomi**		Local programming	
The CW	Spring	Superman & Lois		**Tom Swift**		Local programming	
The CW	Summer	**Leonardo**		Devils		Local programming	
Fox	Fall	The Resident		**Our Kind of People**		Local programming	
Fox	Winter	9-1-1: Lone Star (R)		**Our Kind of People**		Local programming	
Fox	Mid-winter	The Resident		**The Real Dirty Dancing**		Local programming	
Fox	Spring	The Resident		Name That Tune		Local programming	
Fox	Summer	Crime Scene Kitchen (R)		Fantasy Island (R)		Local programming	
Fox	Late summer	So You Think You Can Dance (R)		Fantasy Island (R)		Local programming	
NBC	Fall	The Voice (17/8.11)		**La Brea** (19/7.43)		New Amsterdam	
NBC	Winter	**American Auto**	**Grand Crew**	This Is Us (18/7.76)		New Amsterdam	
NBC	Late winter	Young Rock	Mr. Mayor	This Is Us (18/7.76)		**The Thing About Pam**	
NBC	Spring	Young Rock	Mr. Mayor	This Is Us (18/7.76)		New Amsterdam	
NBC	Late spring	America's Got Talent				**Dancing with Myself**	
NBC	Summer	America's Got Talent				**Password**	

== Wednesday ==
Network		8:00 p.m.	8:30 p.m.	9:00 p.m.	9:30 p.m.	10:00 p.m.	10:30 p.m.
ABC	Fall	The Goldbergs	**The Wonder Years**	The Conners	Home Economics	A Million Little Things	
ABC	Winter	The Goldbergs	**The Wonder Years**	The Conners	Home Economics	The Chase	
ABC	Late winter	The Goldbergs	**The Wonder Years**	The Conners	Home Economics	A Million Little Things	
ABC	Spring	ESPN on ABC sports programming					
ABC	Summer	The Conners (R)	The Goldbergs (R)	**Abbott Elementary** (R)	Home Economics (R)	Press Your Luck (R)	
CBS	Fall	Survivor 41 (22/7.32)		Tough as Nails		**CSI: Vegas** (29/6.80) (Tied with The Good Doctor)	
CBS	Winter	The Price Is Right at Night		The Amazing Race		**Good Sam**	
CBS	Mid-winter	Celebrity Big Brother		The Amazing Race		**Good Sam**	
CBS	Late winter	Survivor 42 (22/7.32)		**Beyond the Edge**		**Good Sam**	
CBS	Spring	The Price is Right at Night (R)				S.W.A.T. (R)	
CBS	Summer	Big Brother		**The Challenge: USA**		S.W.A.T. (R)	
The CW	Fall	Legends of Tomorrow		Batwoman		Local programming	
The CW	Winter	The Flash		Kung Fu		Local programming	
The CW	Summer	Mysteries Decoded		Wellington Paranormal	Wellington Paranormal (R)	Local programming	
Fox	Fall	The Masked Singer		**Alter Ego**		Local programming	
Fox	Winter	I Can See Your Voice		**Next Level Chef**		Local programming	
Fox	Late winter	The Masked Singer		**Domino Masters**		Local programming	
Fox	Spring	MasterChef		So You Think You Can Dance		Local programming	
Fox	Summer	MasterChef				Local programming	
NBC	Fall	Chicago Med (11/9.09)		Chicago Fire (5/9.81)		Chicago P.D. (10/9.15)	
NBC	Summer	America's Got Talent		Chicago Fire (5/9.81)		Chicago P.D. (10/9.15)	

== Thursday ==
Network		8:00 p.m.	8:30 p.m.	9:00 p.m.	9:30 p.m.	10:00 p.m.	10:30 p.m.
ABC	Fall	Station 19		Grey's Anatomy		Big Sky	
ABC	Winter	**Women of the Movement**				**Let the World See**	
ABC	Late winter	Station 19		Grey's Anatomy		Big Sky	
ABC	Spring	NBA on ABC sports programming					
ABC	Summer	Press Your Luck		**Generation Gap**		The Con	
CBS	Fall	Young Sheldon (8/9.21)	United States of Al	**Ghosts** **(USA)** (13/8.41)	B Positive	Bull (20/7.37)	
CBS	Spring	Young Sheldon (8/9.21)	United States of Al	**Ghosts** **(USA)** (13/8.41)	**How We Roll**	Bull (20/7.37)	
CBS	Late spring	Young Sheldon (8/9.21)	United States of Al	**Ghosts** **(USA)** (13/8.41)	B Positive (R)	Bull (20/7.37)	
CBS	Summer	Young Sheldon (8/9.21)	**Ghosts** **(USA)** (R)	Big Brother		**CSI: Vegas** (R)	
The CW	Fall	Walker		Legacies		Local programming	
The CW	Summer	Walker		The Flash (R)		Local programming	
The CW	Late summer	**Bump**	Whose Line Is It Anyway? (R)	**Great Chocolate Showdown**		Local programming	
Fox	Fall	Fox NFL Thursday	Thursday Night Football (8:20 p.m.) (2/15.40)				
Fox	Winter	Joe Millionaire: For Richer or Poorer		Call Me Kat	**Pivoting**	Local programming	
Fox	Late winter	MasterChef Junior		Call Me Kat	**Welcome to Flatch**	Local programming	
Fox	Spring	MasterChef Junior		**Welcome to Flatch**		Local programming	
Fox	Summer	MasterChef (R)		**Welcome to Flatch**		Local programming	
NBC	Fall	Law & Order: Special Victims Unit (R)		Law & Order: Special Victims Unit (28/6.83)		Law & Order: Organized Crime	
NBC	Mid-fall	The Blacklist		Law & Order: Special Victims Unit (28/6.83)		Law & Order: Organized Crime	
NBC	Winter	Law & Order		Law & Order: Special Victims Unit (28/6.83)		Law & Order: Organized Crime	

== Friday ==
Network		8:00 p.m.	8:30 p.m.	9:00 p.m.	9:30 p.m.	10:00 p.m.	10:30 p.m.
ABC		Shark Tank		20/20			
CBS	Fall	S.W.A.T.		Magnum P.I. (21/7.34)		Blue Bloods (6/9.78)	
CBS	Winter	Undercover Boss		Magnum P.I. (21/7.34)		Blue Bloods (6/9.78)	
CBS	Mid-winter	Celebrity Big Brother				Blue Bloods (6/9.78)	
CBS	Late winter	Undercover Boss		Magnum P.I. (21/7.34)		Blue Bloods (6/9.78)	
CBS	Spring	**Come Dance with Me**		Magnum P.I. (21/7.34)		Blue Bloods (6/9.78)	
CBS	Summer	Secret Celebrity Renovation		Blue Bloods (R)			
The CW	Fall	Penn & Teller: Fool Us		Nancy Drew		Local programming	
The CW	Winter	Penn & Teller: Fool Us		Whose Line Is It Anyway? (R)		Local programming	
The CW	Late winter	Charmed		Dynasty		Local programming	
The CW	Spring	Penn & Teller: Fool Us (R)		Dynasty		Local programming	
The CW	Summer	Killer Camp		Dynasty		Local programming	
Fox		WWE Friday Night SmackDown				Local programming	
NBC	Fall	**Home Sweet Home**		Dateline NBC			
NBC	Late fall	The Wall		Dateline NBC			
NBC	Winter	The Blacklist		Dateline NBC			
NBC	Spring	American Ninja Warrior (R)				Dateline NBC	

== Saturday ==
Network		8:00 p.m.	8:30 p.m.	9:00 p.m.	9:30 p.m.	10:00 p.m.	10:30 p.m.
ABC	Fall	ESPN Saturday Night Football on ABC (7:30 p.m.)					
ABC	Late fall	ESPN on ABC sports programming					
ABC	Winter	NBA Countdown	NBA Saturday Primetime				
ABC	Spring	America's Funniest Home Videos (R)		Shark Tank (R)		The Rookie (R)	
ABC	Summer	America's Funniest Home Videos (R)		Various programming		Shark Tank (R)	
ABC	Late summer	America's Funniest Home Videos (R)				The $100,000 Pyramid (R)	
CBS	Fall	Crimetime Saturday				48 Hours	
CBS	Spring	Superstar Racing Experience				48 Hours	
CBS	Summer	Crimetime Saturday				48 Hours	
The CW	Fall	Whose Line Is It Anyway?	Whose Line Is It Anyway? (R)	World's Funniest Animals	World's Funniest Animals (R)	Local programming	
The CW	Winter	**Great Chocolate Showdown**		World's Funniest Animals	World's Funniest Animals (R)	Local programming	
The CW	Spring	Whose Line Is It Anyway? (R)	**Would I Lie to You? (USA)**	Masters of Illusion	Masters of Illusion (R)	Local programming	
The CW	Summer	**Great Chocolate Showdown** (R)		Masters of Illusion	Masters of Illusion (R)	Local programming	
Fox	Fall	Baseball Night in America (7:00 p.m.)				Local programming	
Fox	Mid-fall	Fox College Football (continued until game completion)					
Fox	Winter	9-1-1 (R)		**The Cleaning Lady** (R)		Local programming	
Fox	Late winter	Fox Sports programming				Local programming	
Fox	Spring	Baseball Night in America (7:00 p.m.)				Local programming	
NBC	Fall	The Wall (R)		Dateline Saturday Mystery		SNL Vintage	
NBC	Winter	NBC Sports programming		Dateline Saturday Mystery		SNL Vintage	
NBC	Spring	Dateline Saturday Mystery				SNL Vintage	
NBC	Late spring	Transplant		Dateline Saturday Mystery			
NBC	Summer	The Wall (R)		Dateline Saturday Mystery			
NBC	Late summer	America's Got Talent (R)				Dateline Saturday Mystery	

== By network ==
Notes:

- Series that were originally intended to air in 2019–20 but were delayed due to the COVID-19 pandemic are indicated using †.
- Series that were originally intended to air in 2020–21 but were delayed due to the COVID-19 pandemic are indicated using ‡.

=== ABC ===
Returning series:

- 20/20
- The $100,000 Pyramid
- ABC Hockey Saturday (moved from NBC)
- American Idol
- America's Funniest Home Videos
- The Bachelor
- The Bachelorette
- Big Sky
- Black-ish
- Celebrity Family Feud
- Celebrity Wheel of Fortune
- The Chase
- The Con
- The Conners
- Dancing with the Stars
- The Goldbergs
- The Good Doctor
- The Great Christmas Light Fight
- Grey's Anatomy
- Holey Moley
- Home Economics
- A Million Little Things
- Monday Night Countdown
- Monday Night Football (shared with ESPN)
- NBA Countdown
- NBA Saturday Primetime
- Press Your Luck
- The Rookie
- Saturday Night Football
- Shark Tank
- Station 19
- Supermarket Sweep
- Superstar
- To Tell the Truth
- The Wonderful World of Disney

New series:

- **Abbott Elementary**
- **Claim to Fame**
- **The Fatal Flaw: A Special Edition of 20/20**
- **The Final Straw**
- **Generation Gap**
- **Jeopardy! National College Championship**
- **Judge Steve Harvey**
- **Let the World See**
- **Promised Land**
- **Queens**
- **Who Do You Believe?**
- **Women of the Movement**
- **The Wonder Years**

Not returning from 2020–21:

- American Housewife
- Bachelor in Paradise (returned for 2022–23)
- Call Your Mother
- Card Sharks
- The Celebrity Dating Game
- Emergency Call
- For Life
- The Hustler
- Match Game (returned for 2024–25)
- Mike Tyson: The Knockout
- Mixed-ish
- Pooch Perfect
- Rebel
- Soul of a Nation
- The Ultimate Surfer
- Who Wants to Be a Millionaire (returning for 2023–24)

=== CBS ===
Returning series:

- 48 Hours
- 60 Minutes
- The Amazing Race
- B Positive
- Big Brother
- Blue Bloods
- Bob Hearts Abishola
- Bull
- Celebrity Big Brother
- The Equalizer
- FBI
- FBI: Most Wanted
- The Greatest #AtHome Videos
- Magnum P.I.
- NCIS
- NCIS: Los Angeles
- The Neighborhood
- NFL on CBS
- SEAL Team (Note: The series moved to Paramount+ as an original series after airing the first four episodes of the fifth season on broadcast television.)
- Secret Celebrity Renovation
- Superstar Racing Experience
- Survivor^{‡}
- S.W.A.T.
- Tough as Nails
- Undercover Boss
- United States of Al
- Young Sheldon

New series:

- **Beyond the Edge**
- **The Challenge: USA**
- **Come Dance with Me**
- **CSI: Vegas**
- **FBI: International**
- **Ghosts** **(USA)**
- **Good Sam**
- **How We Roll**
- **NCIS: Hawaiʻi**

Not returning from 2020–21:

- All Rise (moved to Oprah Winfrey Network)
- Clarice
- Kids Say the Darndest Things
- Love Island (moved to Peacock)
- MacGyver
- Manhunt: Deadly Games
- Mom
- NCIS: New Orleans
- One Day at a Time
- Star Trek: Discovery
- The Unicorn

=== The CW ===
Returning series:

- All American
- Batwoman
- Charmed
- Devils
- Dynasty
- The Flash
- In the Dark
- Killer Camp^{‡}
- Kung Fu
- Legacies
- Legends of the Hidden Temple (Note: Series revival; previously aired on Nickelodeon from 1993 to 1995.)
- Legends of Tomorrow
- Masters of Illusion
- Mysteries Decoded
- Nancy Drew
- Penn & Teller: Fool Us
- Riverdale
- Roswell, New Mexico
- Superman & Lois
- Two Sentence Horror Stories
- Walker
- Wellington Paranormal
- Whose Line Is It Anyway?
- World's Funniest Animals

New series:

- **4400**
- **All American: Homecoming**
- **Bump**
- **Great Chocolate Showdown**
- **Leonardo**
- **March**
- **Naomi**
- **Tom Swift**
- **Would I Lie to You? (USA)**

Not returning from 2020–21:

- Black Lightning
- Bulletproof
- Burden of Truth
- The Christmas Caroler Challenge
- Coroner (returned for 2022–23)
- Gilmore Girls: A Year in the Life (Note: U.S. broadcast television premiere; a Netflix original series.)
- The Outpost
- Pandora
- The Republic of Sarah
- Stargirl (returned for 2022–23)
- Supergirl
- Supernatural
- Swamp Thing
- Tell Me a Story
- Trickster

=== Fox ===
Returning series:

- 9-1-1
- 9-1-1: Lone Star
- Baseball Night in America
- Beat Shazam
- Bob's Burgers
- Call Me Kat
- Don't Forget the Lyrics! (Note: Second primetime weekly version; previously aired on Fox from 2007 to 2009, before moving to first-run syndication for two additional seasons until 2011.)
- Duncanville
- Family Guy
- Fox College Football
- Fox NFL Thursday
- The Great North
- I Can See Your Voice
- Joe Millionaire (Note: Series revival; previously aired on Fox in 2003.)
- The Masked Singer
- MasterChef
- MasterChef Junior^{†}
- Name That Tune
- NFL on Fox
- The OT
- The Resident
- The Simpsons
- So You Think You Can Dance^{†}
- Thursday Night Football
- WWE SmackDown

New series:

- **Alter Ego**
- **The Big Leap**
- **The Cleaning Lady**
- **Domino Masters**
- **Next Level Chef**
- **Our Kind of People**
- **Pivoting**
- **The Real Dirty Dancing**
- **Welcome to Flatch**

Not returning from 2020–21:

- America's Most Wanted (returning for 2023–24)
- Bless the Harts
- Cherries Wild
- Cosmos: Possible Worlds
- Crime Scene Kitchen (returned for 2022–23) (Note: Aired repeats)
- Fantasy Island (returned for 2022–23)
- Filthy Rich
- Hell's Kitchen (returned for 2022–23)
- Holmes Family Effect
- HouseBroken (returned for 2022–23)
- L.A.'s Finest
- Last Man Standing
- Lego Masters (returned for 2022–23)
- The Masked Dancer
- Mental Samurai
- The Moodys
- Next
- Prodigal Son

=== NBC ===
Returning series:

- American Ninja Warrior
- America's Got Talent
- The Blacklist
- Chicago Fire
- Chicago Med
- Chicago P.D.
- Dateline NBC
- Family Game Fight!
- Football Night in America
- Kenan
- Law & Order (Note: Series revival; previously aired on NBC from 1990 to 2010.)
- Law & Order: Organized Crime
- Law & Order: Special Victims Unit
- Mr. Mayor
- NBC Sunday Night Football
- New Amsterdam
- Password (Note: Series revival; previously aired on CBS from 1961 to 1967 and ABC from 1971 to 1975, and also spanned two spin-offs on NBC (Password Plus, 1979–82 and Super Password, 1984–89).)
- This Is Us
- Transplant
- The Voice
- The Wall
- Weakest Link
- Who Do You Think You Are? (Note: Returned from TLC; previously aired on NBC from 2010 to 2012.)
- Young Rock

New series:

- **America's Got Talent: Extreme**
- **American Auto**
- **American Song Contest**
- **The Courtship**
- **Dancing with Myself**
- **The Endgame**
- **Grand Crew**
- **Home Sweet Home**
- **La Brea**
- **Ordinary Joe**
- **That's My Jam**
- **The Thing About Pam**

Not returning from 2020–21:

- Brooklyn Nine-Nine
- Capital One College Bowl (returned for 2022–23)
- Connecting (burned off on Peacock)
- Debris
- Ellen's Game of Games
- Good Girls
- Making It
- Manifest (moved to Netflix)
- NHL on NBC (moved to ABC)
- Nurses
- Small Fortune
- Superstore
- Zoey's Extraordinary Playlist

== Renewals and cancellations ==
=== Full season pickups ===
==== ABC ====
- The Goldbergs—Picked up for four additional episodes on January 10, 2022, bringing the episode count to 22.
- Home Economics—Picked up for a 22-episode full season on October 26, 2021.
- The Wonder Years—Picked up for a 22-episode full season on October 26, 2021.

==== CBS ====
- FBI: International—Picked up for a full season on October 11, 2021.
- Ghosts (USA)—Picked up for a full season on October 21, 2021.
- NCIS: Hawaiʻi—Picked up for a full season on October 11, 2021.

=== Renewals ===
==== ABC ====
- 20/20—Renewed for a forty-fifth season on May 17, 2022.
- Abbott Elementary—Renewed for a second season on March 14, 2022.
- ABC Hockey Saturday—Renewed for a ninth season on March 10, 2021; deal will last into a fourteenth season in 2027.
- America's Funniest Home Videos—Renewed for a thirty-third season on May 13, 2022.
- American Idol—Renewed for a twenty-first season on May 13, 2022.
- The Bachelor—Renewed for a twenty-seventh season on May 13, 2022.
- Big Sky—Renewed for a third season on May 13, 2022.
- Celebrity Family Feud—Renewed for a tenth season on January 11, 2023.
- Celebrity Wheel of Fortune—Renewed for a third season on May 13, 2022.
- Claim to Fame—Renewed for a second season on January 11, 2023.
- The Conners—Renewed for a fifth season on May 13, 2022.
- Dancing with the Stars—Renewed for a thirty-first and thirty-second season on April 8, 2022, and would be moving to Disney+.
- Generation Gap—Renewed for a second season on March 24, 2023.
- The Goldbergs—Renewed for a tenth and final season on April 19, 2022.
- The Good Doctor—Renewed for a sixth season on March 30, 2022.
- The Great Christmas Light Fight—Renewed for a tenth season on October 28, 2021.
- Grey's Anatomy—Renewed for a nineteenth season on January 10, 2022.
- Home Economics—Renewed for a third season on May 13, 2022.
- Judge Steve Harvey—Renewed for a second season on April 7, 2022.
- A Million Little Things—Renewed for a fifth and final season on May 13, 2022.
- Monday Night Football–Renewed for a third season on March 18, 2021; deal will last into a thirteenth season in 2033.
- Press Your Luck—Renewed for a fifth season on January 11, 2023.
- The Rookie—Renewed for a fifth season on March 30, 2022.
- Shark Tank—Renewed for a fourteenth season on May 13, 2022.
- Station 19—Renewed for a sixth season on January 11, 2022.
- The Wonder Years—Renewed for a second season on May 13, 2022.

==== CBS ====
- The Amazing Race—Renewed for a thirty-fourth season on March 9, 2022.
- Big Brother—Renewed for a twenty-fifth season on September 25, 2022.
- Blue Bloods—Renewed for a thirteenth season on April 26, 2022.
- Bob Hearts Abishola—Renewed for a fourth season on January 24, 2022.
- The Challenge: USA—Renewed for a second season on May 22, 2023.
- CSI: Vegas—Renewed for a second season on December 15, 2021.
- The Equalizer—Renewed for a third and fourth season on May 5, 2022.
- FBI—Renewed for a fifth and sixth season on May 9, 2022.
- FBI: International—Renewed for a second and third season on May 9, 2022.
- FBI: Most Wanted—Renewed for a fourth and fifth season on May 9, 2022.
- Ghosts (USA)—Renewed for a second season on January 24, 2022.
- NCIS—Renewed for a twentieth season on March 31, 2022.
- NCIS: Hawaiʻi—Renewed for a second season on March 31, 2022.
- NCIS: Los Angeles—Renewed for a fourteenth and final season on March 31, 2022.
- The Neighborhood—Renewed for a fifth season on January 24, 2022.
- Secret Celebrity Renovation—Renewed for a third season on May 22, 2023.
- Survivor—Renewed for a forty-third season on March 9, 2022.
- S.W.A.T.—Renewed for a sixth season on April 8, 2022.
- Tough as Nails—Renewed for a fourth season on April 14, 2021.
- Undercover Boss—Renewed for a twelfth season on September 30, 2026.
- Young Sheldon—Renewed for a sixth and seventh season on March 30, 2021.

==== The CW ====
- All American—Renewed for a fifth season on March 22, 2022.
- All American: Homecoming—Renewed for a second season on May 12, 2022.
- The Flash—Renewed for a ninth and final season on March 22, 2022.
- Kung Fu—Renewed for a third season on March 22, 2022.
- Masters of Illusion—Renewed for a twelfth season on January 20, 2022.
- Nancy Drew—Renewed for a fourth and final season on March 22, 2022.
- Penn & Teller: Fool Us—Renewed for a ninth season on January 20, 2022.
- Riverdale—Renewed for a seventh and final season on March 22, 2022.
- Superman & Lois—Renewed for a third season on March 22, 2022.
- Walker—Renewed for a third season on March 22, 2022.
- World's Funniest Animals—Renewed for a third season on January 20, 2022.

==== Fox ====
- 9-1-1—Renewed for a sixth season on May 16, 2022.
- 9-1-1: Lone Star—Renewed for a fourth season on May 16, 2022.
- Beat Shazam—Renewed for a sixth season on April 5, 2023.
- Bob's Burgers—Renewed for a thirteenth season on September 23, 2020.
- Call Me Kat—Renewed for a third season on May 16, 2022.
- The Cleaning Lady—Renewed for a second season on April 7, 2022.
- Don't Forget the Lyrics!—Renewed for a second season on April 5, 2023.
- Family Guy—Renewed for a twenty-first season on September 23, 2020.
- The Great North—Renewed for a third season on May 17, 2021.
- Hell's Kitchen—Renewed for a twenty-second season on February 1, 2022.
- I Can See Your Voice—Renewed for a third season on May 15, 2023.
- The Masked Singer—Renewed for an eighth season on May 16, 2022.
- MasterChef—Renewed for a thirteenth season on September 14, 2022.
- MasterChef Junior—Renewed for a ninth season on October 12, 2023.
- Next Level Chef—Renewed for a second season on March 2, 2022.
- The Resident—Renewed for a sixth season on May 16, 2022.
- The Simpsons—Renewed for a thirty-fourth season on March 3, 2021.
- So You Think You Can Dance—Renewed for an eighteenth season on December 5, 2023.
- Welcome to Flatch—Renewed for a second season on May 16, 2022.

==== NBC ====
- American Auto—Renewed for a second season on May 12, 2022.
- American Ninja Warrior—Renewed for a fifteenth season on March 29, 2023.
- America's Got Talent—Renewed for an eighteenth season on March 30, 2023.
- The Blacklist—Renewed for a tenth and final season on February 22, 2022.
- Chicago Fire—Renewed for an eleventh season on February 27, 2020.
- Chicago Med—Renewed for an eighth season on February 27, 2020.
- Chicago P.D.—Renewed for a tenth season on February 27, 2020.
- Dateline NBC—Renewed for a thirty-first season on May 16, 2022.
- Football Night in America—Renewed for a seventeenth season on December 14, 2011.
- Grand Crew—Renewed for a second season on May 12, 2022.
- La Brea—Renewed for a second season on November 12, 2021.
- Law & Order—Renewed for a twenty-second season on May 10, 2022.
- Law & Order: Organized Crime—Renewed for a third season on May 10, 2022.
- Law & Order: Special Victims Unit—Renewed for a twenty-fourth season on February 27, 2020.
- NBC Sunday Night Football—Renewed for a seventeenth season on December 14, 2011; deal extended for a twenty-seventh season in 2033.
- New Amsterdam—Renewed for a fifth and final season on January 11, 2020.
- That's My Jam—Renewed for a second season on February 7, 2022.
- Transplant—Renewed for a third season on February 17, 2022.
- The Voice—Renewed for a twenty-second season on May 15, 2022.
- Weakest Link—Renewed for a seventh season on August 1, 2022. and later for a twenty-third season on October 11, 2022.
- Young Rock—Renewed for a third season on May 12, 2022.

=== Cancellations/series endings ===
==== ABC ====
- Black-ish—It was announced on May 14, 2021, that season eight would be the final season. The series concluded on April 19, 2022.
- The Fatal Flaw: A Special Edition of 20/20—The miniseries was meant to run for one season only; it concluded on August 5, 2022.
- The Final Straw—Canceled on March 24, 2023.
- Let the World See—The miniseries was meant to run for one season only; it concluded on January 20, 2022.
- Promised Land—Pulled from the schedule on February 15, 2022, after five episodes. The remaining episodes began airing on Hulu on March 1, 2022. The series was later canceled on May 6, 2022.
- Queens—Canceled on May 6, 2022.
- Women of the Movement—The miniseries was meant to run for one season only; it concluded on January 20, 2022.

==== CBS ====
- Beyond the Edge—Canceled on September 15, 2022.
- B Positive—Canceled on May 12, 2022, after two seasons.
- Bull—It was announced on January 18, 2022, that season six would be the final season. The series concluded on May 26, 2022.
- Good Sam—Canceled on May 12, 2022.
- How We Roll—Canceled on May 12, 2022. The series concluded on May 19, 2022.
- Magnum P.I.—Canceled on May 12, 2022, after four seasons. On June 30, 2022, it was announced that NBC had picked up the series for one more season split into two parts.
- SEAL Team—It was announced on May 18, 2021, that after airing the first four episodes of the fifth season on CBS, the series would be moving to Paramount+ for the remainder of its run.
- United States of Al—Canceled on May 11, 2022, after two seasons. The series concluded on May 19, 2022.

==== The CW ====
- 4400—Canceled on May 12, 2022.
- Batwoman—Canceled on April 29, 2022, after three seasons.
- Charmed—Canceled on May 12, 2022, after four seasons. The series concluded on June 10, 2022.
- Dynasty—It was announced on May 12, 2022, that season five would be the final season. The series concluded on September 16, 2022.
- In the Dark—It was announced on May 12, 2022, that season four would be the final season. The series concluded on September 5, 2022.
- Killer Camp—Pulled from the schedule on October 18, 2021, after two episodes, marking the first cancellation of the season.
- Legacies—Canceled on May 12, 2022, after four seasons. The series concluded on June 16, 2022.
- Legends of the Hidden Temple—Canceled on June 3, 2022.
- Legends of Tomorrow—Canceled on April 29, 2022, after seven seasons.
- March—The miniseries was meant to run for one season only, it concluded on March 27, 2022.
- Naomi—Canceled on May 12, 2022.
- Roswell: New Mexico—It was announced on May 12, 2022, that season four would be the final season. The series concluded on September 5, 2022.
- Tom Swift—Canceled on June 30, 2022. The series concluded on August 2, 2022.
- Wellington Paranormal—The series concluded after four seasons.

==== Fox ====
- The Big Leap—Canceled on March 4, 2022.
- Duncanville—Pulled from the schedule and canceled on June 30, 2022, after three seasons. The last six episodes were released on Hulu on October 18, 2022.
- Our Kind of People—Canceled on May 13, 2022.
- Pivoting—Canceled on May 13, 2022.
- Thursday Night Football—It was announced on May 3, 2021, that from its ninth season onward (beginning with the 2022 season), the series would be moving to Amazon Prime Video.

==== NBC ====
- America's Got Talent: Extreme—The network indefinitely shelved the series on May 16, 2022.
- The Courtship—Pulled from the schedule on March 16, 2022, after two episodes. The remaining episodes began airing on USA Network on March 23, 2022.
- Dancing with Myself—Canceled on March 30, 2023.
- The Endgame—Canceled on May 12, 2022.
- Home Sweet Home—Pulled from the schedule on November 9, 2021, after four episodes. The remaining episodes began airing on Peacock on November 12, 2021.
- Kenan—Canceled on May 12, 2022, after two seasons.
- Mr. Mayor—Canceled on May 12, 2022, after two seasons. The series concluded on May 17, 2022.
- Ordinary Joe—Canceled on March 4, 2022.
- The Thing About Pam—The miniseries was meant to run for one season only; it concluded on April 12, 2022.
- This Is Us—It was announced on May 12, 2021, that season six would be the final season. The series concluded on May 24, 2022.

== See also ==
- 2021–22 Canadian network television schedule
- 2021–22 United States network television schedule (morning)
- 2021–22 United States network television schedule (afternoon)
- 2021–22 United States network television schedule (late night)
- 2021–22 United States network television schedule (overnight)
