= List of 2022 American television debuts =

These American television shows premiered in 2022.

First aired	Title	Channel	Source
January 1	We Baby Bears	Cartoon Network	
January 2	Alex vs. America	Food Network	
January 2	Next Level Chef	Fox	
January 3	The Cleaning Lady	Fox	
January 3	Ugliest Home in America	HGTV	
January 4	Judge Steve Harvey	ABC	
January 4	Action Pack	Netflix	
January 5	Good Sam	CBS	
January 7	Hype House	Netflix	
January 9	Pivoting	Fox	
January 10	Smiling Friends	Adult Swim	
January 11	Naomi	The CW	
January 11	The Kings of Napa	Oprah Winfrey Network	
January 13	Peacemaker	HBO Max	
January 13	My Mom, Your Dad	HBO Max	
January 14	Archive 81	Netflix	
January 16	Warped!	Nickelodeon	
January 16	Somebody Somewhere	HBO	
January 17	The Good Dish	First-run syndication	
January 18	How I Met Your Father	Hulu	
January 20	Supernatural Academy	Peacock	
January 20	True Story with Ed and Randall	Peacock	
January 20	Single Drunk Female	Freeform	
January 20	Men of West Hollywood	Crackle	
January 21	As We See It	Amazon Prime Video	
January 24	Promised Land	ABC	
January 24	The Gilded Age	HBO	
January 24	Jesse Watters Primetime	Fox News	
January 26	Astrid and Lilly Save the World	Syfy	
January 27	Take Out with Lisa Ling	HBO Max	
January 28	The Afterparty	Apple TV+	
January 28	In From the Cold	Netflix	
January 28	Angry Birds: Summer Madness	Netflix	
January 28	The Legend of Vox Machina	Amazon Prime Video	
January 28	Doomlands	The Roku Channel	
January 29	Lawrence Jones Cross Country	Fox News	
January 29	One Nation with Brian Kilmeade	Fox News	
February 1	The Real Dirty Dancing	Fox	
February 3	Murderville	Netflix	
February 4	Reacher	Amazon Prime Video	
February 6	Shenmue	Adult Swim	
February 6	Power Book IV: Force	Starz	
February 8	Jeopardy! National College Championship	ABC	
February 9	Alice's Wonderland Bakery	Disney Jr.	
February 9	Fairview	Comedy Central	
February 10	About Last Night	HBO Max	
February 11	Pretzel and the Puppies	Apple TV+	
February 12	Roman to the Rescue	Disney XD	
February 13	Bel-Air	Peacock	
February 17	Big Nate	Paramount+	
February 18	Severance	Apple TV+	
February 18	The Cuphead Show!	Netflix	
February 20	From	Epix	
February 21	All American: Homecoming	The CW	
February 21	America's Got Talent: Extreme	NBC	
February 21	The Endgame	NBC	
February 25	Vikings: Valhalla	Netflix	
February 27	Super Pumped	Showtime	
February 27	Adam Eats the 80s	History	
March 3	Restaurant Rivals: Irvine vs. Taffer	Discovery+	
March 3	Our Flag Means Death	HBO Max	
March 4	The Boys Presents: Diabolical	Amazon Prime Video	
March 4	Pieces of Her	Netflix	
March 6	Shining Vale	Starz	
March 6	Someone They Knew... with Tamron Hall	Court TV	
March 6	The Courtship	NBC	
March 6	Winning Time: The Rise of the Lakers Dynasty	HBO	
March 8	No Retreat: Business Bootcamp	CNBC	
March 9	Domino Masters	Fox	
March 10	Bust Down	Peacock	
March 11	Life After Death with Tyler Henry	Netflix	
March 13	Game Theory with Bomani Jones	HBO	
March 15	Team Zenko Go	Netflix	
March 16	Beyond the Edge	CBS	
March 17	Welcome to Flatch	Fox	
March 17	Million Dollar Hustle	Lifetime	
March 17	Minx	HBO Max	
March 17	Below Deck Down Under	Peacock	
March 18	Human Resources	Netflix	
March 18	Life & Beth	Hulu	
March 21	American Song Contest	NBC	
March 24	Halo	Paramount+	
March 24	Becoming A Popstar	MTV	
March 24	One Perfect Shot	HBO Max	
March 25	Pachinko	Apple TV+	
March 25	Transformers: BotBots	Netflix	
March 26	Be My Guest	Discovery+/Food Network	
March 26	Sventoonie	MeTV	
March 31	Julia	HBO Max	
March 31	Brené Brown: Atlas of the Heart	HBO Max	
March 31	The Fairly OddParents: Fairly Odder	Paramount+	
March 31	Super PupZ	Netflix	
March 31	Killing It	Peacock	
March 31	How We Roll	CBS	
March 31	Rat in the Kitchen	TBS	
April 1	Slow Horses	Apple TV+	
April 1	Trivia Quest	Netflix	
April 3	Final Moments	Oxygen	
April 7	Tokyo Vice	HBO Max	
April 7	MLB Daily Recap	Apple TV+	
April 8	Pinecone & Pony	Apple TV+	
April 8	Friday Night Baseball	Apple TV+	
April 8	Barbie: It Takes Two	Netflix	
April 9	The Katie Phang Show	MSNBC/Peacock	
April 9	Would I Lie to You?	The CW	
April 10	61st Street	AMC	
April 10	Building Roots	HGTV	
April 11	TMZ Hip Hop	First-run syndication	
April 12	The Creature Cases	Netflix	
April 13	Ice Age: Scrat Tales	Disney+	
April 13	Mister Hadding	Paramount+	-
April 14	The Kardashians	Hulu	
April 14	The Garcias	HBO Max	
April 15	Roar	Apple TV+	
April 15	Come Dance With Me	CBS	
April 15	Outer Range	Amazon Prime Video	
April 15	Swimming with Sharks	The Roku Channel	
April 17	The First Lady	Showtime	
April 24	The Man Who Fell to Earth	Showtime	
April 24	Billy the Kid	Epix	
April 24	The Baby	HBO	
April 27	Sketchbook	Disney+	
April 27	Bullsh*t: The Game Show	Netflix	
April 28	Samurai Rabbit: The Usagi Chronicles	Netflix	
April 29	Shining Girls	Apple TV+	
April 29	I Love That for You	Showtime	
April 30	Mecha Builders	Cartoon Network	
May 1	Welcome Home Nikki Glaser?	E!	
May 3	Who Do You Believe?	ABC	
May 5	Star Trek: Strange New Worlds	Paramount+	
May 6	Bosch: Legacy	Amazon Freevee	
May 7	Symone	MSNBC/Peacock	
May 9	Mecha Builders	Cartoonito	
May 10	Never Seen Again	Paramount+	
May 13	The Lincoln Lawyer	Netflix	
May 14	The Nightcap with Carlos King	Oprah Winfrey Network	
May 15	The Time Traveler's Wife	HBO	
May 18	Love on the Spectrum U.S.	Netflix	
May 19	The Boss Baby: Back in the Crib	Netflix	
May 19	The G Word with Adam Conover	Netflix	
May 19	Kingdom Business	BET+	
May 20	Night Sky	Amazon Prime Video	
May 24	Slippin' Jimmy	AMC+	
May 26	My Little Pony: Make Your Mark	Netflix	
May 31	Tom Swift	The CW	
May 31	Dancing with Myself	NBC	
June 3	The Villains of Valley View	Disney Channel	
June 3	Ultra Violet & Black Scorpion	Disney Channel	
June 3	Guy's All-American Road Trip	Food Network	
June 6	Face's Music Party	Nickelodeon	
June 9	Queer as Folk	Peacock	
June 10	First Kill	Netflix	
June 12	Dark Winds	AMC	
June 14	Dateline: The Last Day	Peacock	
June 15	God's Favorite Idiot	Netflix	
June 15	Iron Chef: Quest for an Iron Legend	Netflix	
June 15	Family Reboot	Disney+	
June 16	The Old Man	FX	
June 16	Dead End: Paranormal Park	Netflix	
June 16	Players	Paramount+	
June 17	The Summer I Turned Pretty	Amazon Prime Video	
June 21	Hip Hop My House	Paramount+	
June 22	Eureka!	Disney Jr.	
June 23	Austin Dillon's Life in the Fast Lane	USA Network	
June 23	The Bear	Hulu	
June 23	Gordita Chronicles	HBO Max	
June 23	JoJo Goes	Facebook Watch	
June 24	Loot	Apple TV+	
June 29	Baymax!	Disney+	
June 29	All Star Shore	Paramount+	
July 1	The Terminal List	Amazon Prime Video	
July 6	Maggie	Hulu	
July 6	The Challenge: USA	CBS	
July 7	Generation Gap	ABC	
July 7	Moonhaven	AMC+	
July 10	The Final Straw	ABC	
July 11	Claim to Fame	ABC	
July 13	Everything's Trash	Freeform	
July 14	Resident Evil	Netflix	
July 14	Kung Fu Panda: The Dragon Knight	Netflix	
July 15	Farzar	Netflix	
July 15	The Rehearsal	HBO	
July 21	Rap Sh!t	HBO Max	
July 25	Bugs Bunny Builders	Cartoonito	
July 28	Pretty Little Liars: Original Sin	HBO Max	
July 28	The Resort	Peacock	
July 28	Keep Breathing	Netflix	
July 29	Uncoupled	Netflix	
July 29	Surface	Apple TV+	
July 29	Amber Brown	Apple TV+	
July 29	Paper Girls	Amazon Prime Video	
August 1	Snake in the Grass	USA Network	
August 1	Big Tree City	Netflix	
August 4	Super Giant Robot Brothers	Netflix	
August 5	The Sandman	Netflix	
August 10	I Am Groot	Disney+	
August 10	Instant Dream Home	Netflix	
August 10	Court Night Live	A&E	
August 12	A League of Their Own	Amazon Prime Video	
August 12	This Fool	Hulu	
August 12	Hamster & Gretel	Disney Channel	
August 14	Tales of the Walking Dead	AMC	
August 15	Deepa & Anoop	Netflix	
August 16	Alex Wagner Tonight	MSNBC	
August 18	Tekken: Bloodline	Netflix	
August 19	Bad Sisters	Apple TV+	
August 19	Surfside Girls	Apple TV+	
August 19	Sprung	Amazon Freevee	
August 21	House of the Dragon	HBO	
August 23	Chad & JT Go Deep	Netflix	
August 24	Selling the OC	Netflix	
August 24	Mo	Netflix	
August 24	Welcome to Wrexham	FX	
August 25	The End is Nye	Peacock	
August 25	Little Demon	FXX	
August 26	Partner Track	Netflix	
September 1	Pantheon	AMC+	
September 1	Race for the Championship	USA Network	
September 2	The Lord of the Rings: The Rings of Power	Amazon Prime Video	
September 2	Buy My House	Netflix	
September 7	Raising a F***ing Star	E!	
September 7	Tell Me Lies	Hulu	
September 8	Cars on the Road	Disney+	
September 8	Epic Adventures with Bertie Gregory	Disney+	
September 8	Growing Up	Disney+	
September 9	The Tiny Chef Show	Nickelodeon	
September 11	American Gigolo	Showtime	
September 11	Monarch	Fox	
September 11	The Serpent Queen	Starz	
September 12	iCrime with Elizabeth Vargas	First-run syndication	
September 12	We the People with Judge Lauren Lake	First-run syndication	
September 12	The Jennifer Hudson Show	First-run syndication	
September 12	Pictionary	First-run syndication	
September 12	Sherri	First-run syndication	
September 12	NBC News Daily	NBC	
September 15	Vampire Academy	Peacock	
September 16	My Dream Quinceañera	Paramount+	
September 17	Batwheels	Cartoonito/HBO Max	
September 19	Karamo	First-run syndication	
September 20	Reboot	Hulu	
September 21	Designing Miami	Netflix	
September 21	Andor	Disney+	
September 21	Super/Natural	Disney+	
September 21	Firebuds	Disney Jr.	
September 25	Celebrity Jeopardy!	ABC	
September 26	Ring Nation	First-run syndication	
September 27	The Rookie: Feds	ABC	
September 27	Reasonable Doubt	Hulu	
September 29	So Help Me Todd	CBS	
September 29	Zatima	BET+	
October 1	Housing Complex C	Adult Swim	
October 1	Saving Me	BYUtv	
October 2	East New York	CBS	
October 2	Interview with the Vampire	AMC	
October 3	Rosie's Rules	PBS Kids	
October 5	The Real Love Boat	CBS	
October 5	Abominable and the Invisible City	Hulu/Peacock	
October 5	Reginald the Vampire	Syfy	
October 6	Alaska Daily	ABC	
October 6	Walker: Independence	The CW	
October 6	Monster High	Nickelodeon	
October 7	The Midnight Club	Netflix	
October 7	Fire Country	CBS	
October 7	Oddballs	Netflix	
October 9	Let the Right One In	Showtime	
October 10	Spirit Rangers	Netflix	
October 11	The Winchesters	The CW	
October 13	The Watcher	Netflix	
October 14	Shantaram	Apple TV+	
October 14	High School	Amazon Freevee	
October 21	The Peripheral	Amazon Prime Video	
October 22	Criss Angel's Magic With the Stars	The CW	
October 25	Guillermo del Toro's Cabinet of Curiosities	Netflix	
October 25	The Boulet Brothers' Dragula: Titans	Shudder	
October 26	Tales of The Jedi	Disney+	
October 27	Daniel Spellbound	Netflix	
November 1	Below Deck Adventure	Bravo	
November 1	CNN This Morning	CNN	
November 2	Donna Hay Christmas	Disney+	
November 3	Blockbuster	Netflix	
November 3	The Really Loud House	Nickelodeon	
November 4	Buying Beverly Hills	Netflix	
November 4	Lopez vs Lopez	NBC	
November 9	Zootopia+	Disney+	
November 9	Dangerous Liaisons	Starz	
November 10	The Big Brunch	HBO Max	
November 10	The Calling	Peacock	
November 11	Transformers: EarthSpark	Paramount+	
November 13	Tulsa King	Paramount+	
November 16	The Santa Clauses	Disney+	
November 16	Limitless with Chris Hemsworth	Disney+	
November 23	Wednesday	Netflix	
November 23	Pitch Perfect: Bumper in Berlin	Peacock	
November 23	Echo 3	Apple TV+	
November 28	Southern Hospitality	Bravo	
November 30	Irreverent	Peacock	
November 30	Willow	Disney+	
December 2	Three Pines	Amazon Prime Video	
December 5	Back In The Groove	Hulu	
December 5	Barmageddon	USA Network	
December 9	America's Test Kitchen: The Next Generation	Amazon Freevee	
December 9	Dragon Age: Absolution	Netflix	
December 13	Dr. Seuss Baking Challenge	Amazon Prime Video	
December 13	Kindred	Hulu	
December 14	National Treasure: Edge of History	Disney+	
December 15	The Parent Test	ABC	
December 15	Love for the Ages	Peacock	
December 15	Sonic Prime	Netflix	
December 16	The Recruit	Netflix	
December 18	1923	Paramount+	
December 19	The Wheel	NBC	

== Television films and specials ==
These television films and specials premiered in 2022.

First aired	Title	Channel	Source
January 4	Gordon Ramsay's Road Trip: Greek Vacation	Fox	
January 14	The House	Netflix	
January 14	Ray Donovan: The Movie	Showtime	
January 27	Truth and Lies: The Last Gangster	ABC	
January 29	Undeniable: The Truth to Remember	CBS	
January 31	Celebrating Betty White: America's Golden Girl	NBC	
March 20	An Audience with Adele	NBC	
March 20	Step Into...The Movies With Derek and Julianne Hough	ABC	
April 2	Whitney, A Look Back	CBS	
April 15	Bill Maher: Adulting	HBO	
April 18	Elinor Wonders Why: A Wonderful Journey	PBS Kids	
May 25	The American Rescue Dog Show	ABC	
May 25	The Great American Tag Sale with Martha Stewart	ABC	
June 1	South Park: The Streaming Wars	Paramount+	
June 7	TMZ Presents Johnny vs. Amber: From Love to Hate	Fox	
June 16	Martin: The Reunion	BET+	
June 23	Beavis and Butt-Head Do the Universe	Paramount+	
July 3	Ukraine: Answering The Call	NBC	
July 13	South Park: The Streaming Wars Part 2	Paramount+	
July 15	Zombies 3	Disney+	
September 5	Out of Office	Comedy Central	
September 8	Queen Elizabeth II: The Legacy, The Life	ABC	
September 22	Norman Lear: 100 Years of Music and Laughter	ABC	
September 30	Entergalactic	Netflix	
October 3	A Sinister Halloween Scary Opposites Solar Special	Hulu	
October 6	Monster High: The Movie	Nickelodeon/Paramount+	
October 7	Werewolf by Night	Disney+	
November 17	Pickled	CBS	
November 18	Best in Snow	Disney+	
November 18	Blue's Big City Adventure	Paramount+	
November 20	A Waltons Thanksgiving	The CW	
November 25	The Guardians of the Galaxy Holiday Special	Disney+	
November 27	Mickey Saves Christmas	ABC/Disney Channel/Disney Jr./Disney XD	
November 27	Tis the Season: The Holidays on Screen	CNN	
November 27	The Wonderful World of Disney: Magical Holiday Celebration	ABC	
November 27	The Howard Stern Interview: Bruce Springsteen	HBO	
November 29	Reindeer in Here	CBS	
November 29	Love, Actually: 20 Years Later – A Diane Sawyer/ABC News Special	ABC	
December 1	Dolly Parton's Mountain Magic Christmas	NBC	
December 1	Sesame Street: The Nutcracker	HBO Max	
December 2	Pentatonix: Around the World for the Holidays	Disney+	
December 2	Christmas With the Campbells	AMC+	
December 2	The Great American Baking Show: Celebrity Holiday	The Roku Channel	
December 2	Hotel for the Holidays	Amazon Freevee	
December 3	Reno 911!: It's a Wonderful Heist	Comedy Central	
December 4	Fit for Christmas	CBS	
December 5	That's My Jam	NBC	
December 6	Sebastian Maniscalco: Is It Me?	Netflix	
December 7	The Greatest Holiday Commercials Countdown	The CW	
December 8	CMA Country Christmas	ABC	
December 8	Superstar: Reba McEntire	ABC	
December 9	All I Didn't Want For Christmas	VH1	
December 11	Must Love Christmas	CBS	
December 11	The Fireplace	Adult Swim	
December 15	Beauty and the Beast: A 30th Celebration	ABC	
December 18	When Christmas Was Young	CBS	
December 20	Mariah Carey: Merry Christmas to All!	CBS	
December 26	Woooooo! Becoming Ric Flair	Peacock	
December 30	This Place Rules	HBO	

== Miniseries ==
This listing consists of shows classified as miniseries, limited series, or limited docuseries which premiered in 2022.

First aired	Title	Channel	Source
January 6	Women of the Movement	ABC	
January 6	Let the World See	ABC	
January 6	Joe Montana: Cool Under Pressure	Peacock	
January 6	Indivisible: Healing Hate	Paramount+	
January 7	El Deafo	Apple TV+	
January 16	Reframed: The Many Lives of Marilyn Monroe	CNN	
January 24	March	The CW	
January 28	The Woman in the House Across the Street from the Girl in the Window	Netflix	
February 2	Pam & Tommy	Hulu	
February 4	Phat Tuesdays: The Era of Hip Hop Comedy	Amazon Prime Video	
February 11	Inventing Anna	Netflix	
February 18	Lincoln's Dilemma	Apple TV+	
March 3	The Dropout	Hulu	
March 3	Joe vs. Carole	Peacock	
March 8	The Thing About Pam	NBC	
March 11	The Last Days of Ptolemy Grey	Apple TV+	
March 17	DMZ	HBO Max	
March 18	WeCrashed	Apple TV+	
March 26	Sventoonie	MeTV	
March 29	The Girl from Plainville	Hulu	
March 30	Moon Knight	Disney+	
April 13	Our Great National Parks	Netflix	
April 22	They Call Me Magic	Apple TV+	
April 24	Gaslit	Starz	
April 25	We Own This City	HBO	
April 28	The Offer	Paramount+	
April 28	Under the Banner of Heaven	Hulu	
May 5	The Big Conn	Apple TV+	
May 5	The Pentaverate	Netflix	
May 5	The Staircase	HBO Max	
May 9	Candy	Hulu	
May 19	Angelyne	Peacock	
May 27	Obi-Wan Kenobi	Disney+	
May 31	Pistol	Hulu	
June 6	Irma Vep	HBO	
June 8	Ms. Marvel	Disney+	
July 1	The Black Hamptons	BET+	
July 4	America the Beautiful	Disney+	
July 8	Black Bird	Apple TV+	
July 8	Boo, Bitch	Netflix	
July 18	The Captain	ESPN	
August 12	Five Days at Memorial	Apple TV+	
August 18	She-Hulk: Attorney at Law	Disney+	
August 19	Echoes	Netflix	
August 24	Lost Ollie	Netflix	
August 25	Mike	Hulu	
August 30	The Patient	Hulu	
September 2	Devil in Ohio	Netflix	
September 21	Dahmer – Monster: The Jeffrey Dahmer Story	Netflix	
October 6	A Friend of the Family	Peacock	
October 7	The Lincoln Project	Showtime	
October 12	I Love You, You Hate Me	Peacock	
October 21	From Scratch	Netflix	
November 11	The English	Amazon Prime Video	
November 17	Fleishman Is in Trouble	Hulu	
November 22	Welcome to Chippendales	Hulu	
December 2	Riches	Amazon Prime Video	
December 4	George & Tammy	Showtime/Paramount Network	
December 8	Harry & Meghan	Netflix	
December 22	The Best Man: The Final Chapters	Peacock	
December 25	The Witcher: Blood Origin	Netflix	
December 27	Chef Dynasty: House of Fang	Food Network	
