= 2022 in television =

2022 in television may refer to

- 2022 in American television for television-related events in the United States.
  - List of 2022 American television debuts for television debut related events in the United States.
- 2022 in Australian television for television-related events in Australia.
- 2022 in British television for television-related events in the United Kingdom.
  - 2022 in Scottish television for television-related events in Scotland.
- 2022 in Canadian television for television-related events in Canada.
- 2022 in Croatian television for television-related events in Croatia.
- 2022 in Irish television for television-related events in the Republic of Ireland.
- 2022 in Japanese television for television-related events in Japan.
- 2022 in Pakistani television for television-related events in Pakistan.
- 2022 in Philippine television for television-related events in the Philippines.
- 2022 in Tamil television for television-related events in India for Tamil language.
- 2022 in South Korean television for television-related events in South Korea.
