= Home Sweet Home (American TV series) =

American reality social experiment

- Genre: Reality social experiment
- Created by: Ava DuVernay
- Composer: Andrew Scott Bell
- Country of origin: United States
- Original language: English
- No. of seasons: 1
- No. of episodes: 9

Production
- Executive producers: Ava DuVernay; Paul Garnes
- Production companies: ARRAY Filmworks; Warner Horizon Unscripted Television

Original release
- Network: NBC (Episodes 1–4); Peacock (Episodes 5–9)
- Release: October 15 – December 17, 2021

Home Sweet Home is an American reality social experiment television series, created by Ava DuVernay. In each episode, two families swap homes for a week to learn about the other family's experience. The series premiered on October 15, 2021, on NBC, before being pulled off the schedule on November 9, after four episodes. The series moved to Peacock on November 12, 2021.

== Production ==
On July 16, 2020, it was announced that NBC had ordered the series with Ava DuVernay, Sarah Bremner and Paul Garnes as the executive producers. On August 19, 2021, it was announced that Bremner left the series. It was also announced that the series would premiere on October 15, 2021.

== Episodes ==
No.	Title	Original release date	U.S. viewers (millions)
NBC
1	"Not as Important as I Thought I Was!"	October 15, 2021	1.41
2	"There's No TV?"	October 22, 2021	1.39
3	"Art Is My God."	October 29, 2021	1.29
4	"You Can Be a Cowboy!"	November 5, 2021	1.31
Peacock
5	"The Alley Provides"	November 12, 2021	N/A
6	"We Use a Lot of Shampoo"	November 19, 2021	N/A
7	"I Miss My Salsas"	December 3, 2021	N/A
8	"A New Understanding About Compton"	December 10, 2021	N/A
9	"It's Gonna Take Lifetimes"	December 17, 2021	N/A

== Reception ==
=== Critical response ===
Angie Han, writing for The Hollywood Reporter, wrote of the series that "while Home Sweet Home can’t quite manage to fix all the prejudices and misunderstandings that ail modern society, it’s at least an agreeable reminder that it doesn’t hurt to try," and that it "[sees] its purpose as bridging the gaps between people from different walks of life," and concluded that, compared to other reality shows that might have been framed as mean-spirited, Home Sweet Home stays firmly on the side of nice.

=== Ratings ===
Viewership and ratings per episode of Home Sweet Home
No.	Title	Air date	Timeslot (ET)	Rating (18–49)	Viewers (millions)	DVR (18–49)	DVR viewers (millions)	Total (18–49)	Total viewers (millions)
1	"Not as Important as I Thought I Was!"	October 15, 2021	Friday 8:00 p.m.	0.2	1.41	0.0	0.10	0.2	1.51 (Note: Live+7 ratings were unavailable, so Live+3 ratings have been used instead.)
2	"There's No TV?"	October 22, 2021	Friday 8:00 p.m.	0.2	1.39	0.0	0.14	0.2	1.52
3	"Art Is My God."	October 29, 2021	Friday 8:00 p.m.	0.2	1.29	0.0	0.05	0.2	1.34
4	"You Can Be a Cowboy!"	November 5, 2021	Friday 8:00 p.m.	0.2	1.31	0.0	0.09	0.2	1.42
