= The Fatal Flaw: A Special Edition of 20/20 =

2022 television documentary series

- Genre: Documentary
- Directed by: Remy Weber
- Country of origin: United States
- Original languages: English; Portuguese; Hindi
- No. of episodes: 4

Production
- Executive producers: David Sloan; Colleen Halpin; Remy Weber
- Production company: ABC News

Original release
- Network: ABC
- Release: July 7 – August 5, 2022

The Fatal Flaw: A Special Edition of 20/20 (also known as The Fatal Flaw or Fatal Flaw) is an American four-part television documentary series that premiered on ABC on July 7, 2022.

== Episodes ==
No.	Title	Original release date	Prod. code	U.S. viewers (millions)
1	"The Eyes Have It"	July 7, 2022	102	2.07
2	"Office Politics"	July 14, 2022	101	2.10
3	"Secrets in the Freezer"	July 29, 2022	103	2.86
4	"On The Rocks"	August 5, 2022	104	2.83
