= Let the World See =

2022 television documentary series

- Genre: Documentary
- Directed by: Jeanmarie Condon; Fatima Curry
- Country of origin: United States
- Original language: English
- No. of series: 1
- No. of episodes: 3

Production
- Executive producers: Jeanmarie Condon; Fatima Curry; Shawn Carter; Tyran Smith; Jay Brown; Will Smith; James Lassiter; Aaron Kaplan
- Running time: 42 minutes
- Production companies: ABC News Studios; Roc Nation; Westbrook Studios; Kapital Entertainment; Cobble Hill Films

Original release
- Network: ABC
- Release: January 6 – January 20, 2022

Let the World See is an American three-part television documentary series which premiered on January 6, 2022 on ABC. Serving as a companion series to Women of the Movement, this documentary looks at the life and murder of 14-year-old Emmett Till and its effects of the Civil Rights Movement and African-American life today.

== Episodes ==
| No. | Title | Original release date | U.S. viewers (millions) |
|---|---|---|---|
| 1 | "The Boy from Chicago" | January 6, 2022 | 2.81 |
| 2 | "There He Is" | January 13, 2022 | 2.59 |
| 3 | "Say His Name" | January 20, 2022 | 2.21 |
