= Domino Masters =

American reality competition television series

- Directed by: Ramy Romany
- Presented by: Eric Stonestreet
- Judges: Danica McKellar; Vernon Davis; Steve Price
- Narrated by: Joe Buck
- Country of origin: United States
- Original language: English
- No. of seasons: 1
- No. of episodes: 10

Production
- Executive producers: Gail Berman; Danny Schrader; Hend Baghdady
- Producer: Eric Stonestreet
- Production location: Santa Monica Airport
- Production companies: The Jackal Group; Fox Alternative Entertainment

Original release
- Network: Fox
- Release: March 9 – May 11, 2022

Domino Masters (stylized as DOMiNO MASTERS) is an American reality competition television series that aired on Fox from March 9 to May 11, 2022. The series is hosted by Eric Stonestreet, with Danica McKellar, Vernon Davis, and Steve Price serving as judges.

== Format ==
Teams consisting of three domino-building competitors are tasked with building creations out of domino pieces based on a given theme. The judges will name the winning team's build, advancing them to the next round. The season will culminate in a finale, in which top teams compete for $100,000, a Domino Masters trophy, and the title of Domino Masters.

== Production ==
On March 26, 2021, it was announced that Fox had ordered the series with Eric Stonestreet as host. On May 16, 2021, it was announced that actress Danica McKellar, former football player Vernon Davis, and domino expert Steve Price would serve as judges for the series. On January 26, 2022, it was announced that the series would premiere on March 9, 2022.

== Elimination table ==
Place	Team name	Episodes									
Place	Team name	1	2	3	4	5	6	7	8	9 (A + B)	10
Place	Team name	Group A	Group B		A		B	A	B	9 (A + B)	10
1	Dominerds	N/A	N/A	WIN	N/A	N/A	SAFE	N/A	SAFE	SAFE	WINNERS
2	Brains and Brawn	WIN	N/A	N/A	N/A	SAFE	N/A	SAFE	N/A	SAFE	RUNNERS-UP
3	Mechanical Mavericks	N/A	N/A	N/A	RISK	SAFE	N/A	SAFE	N/A	SAFE	THIRD
4	The OG Topplers	N/A	WIN	N/A	N/A	N/A	SAFE	N/A	SAFE	OUT	
5	Runs in the Family	N/A	RISK	N/A	N/A	N/A	SAFE	N/A	OUT		
6	Back Breakers	N/A	N/A	N/A	WIN	SAFE	N/A	OUT			
7	Triathletes	N/A	N/A	RISK	N/A	N/A	OUT				
8	Construction Crew	RISK	N/A	N/A	N/A	OUT					
10	Teen Topplers	N/A	N/A	N/A	OUT						
10	Wonder Women	N/A	N/A	N/A	OUT						
12	Bearded Buddies	N/A	N/A	OUT							
12	Charlie's Angles	N/A	N/A	OUT							
14	Bi-Coastal Brainiacs	N/A	OUT								
14	Bad Boys Big Toys	N/A	OUT								
16	Dominators	OUT									
16	Rocket Science	OUT									

The team was crowned the best of the night and was not eliminated.
The team was in the bottom three but was safe from elimination.
The team was safe from elimination.
The team was eliminated from the competition.
The team was not a part of the episode.

== Episodes ==
No.	Title	Original release date	Prod. code	U.S. viewers (millions)
1	"Qualifiers: Sports Night"	March 9, 2022	DMA-101	1.68
The first four teams were introduced and were tasked with designing a sport themed chain reaction of dominoes. Construction Crew chose football, Rocket Science chose hockey, Dominators chose mini golf, and Brains & Brawn chose baseball. All teams presented their creations to the judges who decided that Brains & Brawn were the best of the night and also sent Construction Crew to the quarter-finals, sending Rocket Science and Dominators home at the end of the night.
2	"Qualifiers: Holidays"	March 16, 2022	DMA-102	1.69
Four new teams were introduced and were tasked with designing holiday themed chain reaction of dominoes. Bad Boys Big Toys chose 4th of July, Runs in the Family chose Halloween, Bi-Coastal Brainiacs chose New Year's, and The OG Topplers chose Thanksgiving. All teams presented their creations to the judges who decided that The OG Topplers were the best of the night and also sent Runs in the Family to the quarter-finals, sending Bad Boys Big Toys and Bi-Coastal Braniacs home at the end of the night.
3	"Qualifiers: Time Travel"	March 23, 2022	DMA-103	1.99
Four new teams were introduced and were tasked with designing a time travel themed chain reaction of dominoes. Triathletes chose the future, Bearded Buddies chose the 1970's, Charlie's Angles chose the new world era, and Dominerds chose the wild west. All teams presented their creations to the judges who decided that Dominerds were the best of the night and also sent Triathletes to the quarter-finals, sending Charlie's Angles and Bearded Buddies home at the end of the night.
4	"Qualifiers: Movie Night"	March 30, 2022	DMA-104	1.82
The last four teams were introduced and were tasked with designing a movie themed chain reaction of dominoes. Back Breakers chose horror, Wonder Women chose fantasy, Mechanical Mavericks chose romance, and Teen Topplers chose science fiction. All teams presented their creations to the judges who decided that Back Breakers were the best of the night and also sent Mechanical Mavericks to the quarter-finals, sending Wonder Women and Teen Topplers home at the end of the night.
5	"Playoffs: Water Worlds"	April 6, 2022	DMA-105	1.65
The teams were tasked with designing a water world themed chain reaction of dominoes. Brains & Brawn chose a treasure hunt, Back Breakers chose a marine biologist, Mechanical Mavericks chose a submarine tour, and Construction Crew chose camping in Alaska. All teams presented their creations to the judges who sent Construction Crew home at the end of the night. Guest starring Carmen Electra.
6	"Playoffs: Vegas Night"	April 13, 2022	DMA-106	1.62
The teams were tasked with designing a Las Vegas themed chain reaction of dominoes. Dominerds chose love in Las Vegas, The OG Topplers chose a Vegas heist, Runs in the Family chose the jackpot, and Triathletes chose a proposal. All teams presented their creations to the judges who sent Triathletes home at the end of the night. Guest starring Justin Willman.
7	"Quarter-finals: Circus Night"	April 20, 2022	DMA-107	1.56
The teams were tasked with designing a circus themed chain reaction of dominoes. Mechanical Mavericks chose a circus dreamland, Back Breakers chose the death defying dominoes, and Brains and Brawn chose circus animals takeover. All teams presented their creations to the judges who chose Brains and Brawn and Mechanical Mavericks to move on to the semifinals and sent Back Breakers home at the end of the night.
8	"Quarter-finals: Bill Nye Night"	April 27, 2022	DMA-108	1.56
The teams were tasked with designing a science themed chain reaction of dominoes. The OG Topplers chose robots attack, Runs in the Family chose a science fair, and Dominerds chose a science convention. All teams presented their creations to the judges who chose Dominerds and The OG Topplers to move on to the semifinals and sent Runs in the Family home at the end of the night. Guest starring Bill Nye.
9	"Semi-final: Hot Wheels"	May 4, 2022	DMA-109	1.69
The teams were tasked with designing a Hot Wheels themed chain reaction of dominoes. Mechanical Mavericks chose a cross country race, The OG Topplers chose cars vs. dominoes, Dominerds chose a kid's bedroom, and Brains and Brawn chose a race through the elements. All teams presented their creations to the judges who chose Dominerds, Brains and Brawn, and Mechanical Mavericks to move on to the finale and sent The OG Topplers home at the end of the night.
10	"Finale: The Sky's The Limit"	May 11, 2022	DMA-110	1.37
The teams were tasked with designing a chain reaction of dominoes with their own theme. Dominerds chose an international treasure quest, Mechanical Mavericks chose our domino journey, and Brains and Brawn chose a domino fairytale. All teams presented their creations to the judges who chose Mechanical Mavericks as third place, Brains and Brawn as the runners up and the Dominerds as the winners of the season, taking home $100,000 and the Domino Masters trophy.

== Ratings ==
Viewership and ratings per episode of Domino Masters
No.	Title	Air date	Timeslot (ET)	Rating/share (18–49)	Viewers (millions)	DVR (18–49)	DVR viewers (millions)	Total (18–49)	Total viewers (millions)	Ref.
1	"Qualifiers: Sports Night"	March 9, 2022	Wednesday 9:00 p.m.	0.4/3	1.68	0.1	0.41	0.5	2.10	
2	"Qualifiers: Holidays"	March 16, 2022	Wednesday 9:00 p.m.	0.4/3	1.69	0.1	0.42	0.5	2.11	
3	"Qualifiers: Time Travel"	March 23, 2022	Wednesday 9:00 p.m.	0.4/3	1.99	0.1	0.41	0.5	2.40	
4	"Qualifiers: Movie Night"	March 30, 2022	Wednesday 9:00 p.m.	0.4/3	1.82	0.1	0.39	0.4	2.08	
5	"Playoffs: Water Worlds"	April 6, 2022	Wednesday 9:00 p.m.	0.3/3	1.65	0.1	0.37	0.4	2.02	
6	"Playoffs: Vegas Night"	April 13, 2022	Wednesday 9:00 p.m.	0.3/2	1.62	0.1	0.39	0.4	1.95	
7	"Quarter-finals: Circus Night"	April 20, 2022	Wednesday 9:00 p.m.	0.3/3	1.56	0.2	0.52	0.5	2.08	
8	"Quarter-finals: Bill Nye Night"	April 27, 2022	Wednesday 9:00 p.m.	0.3/3	1.56	—N/a	—N/a	—N/a	—N/a	
9	"Semi-final: Hot Wheels"	May 4, 2022	Wednesday 9:00 p.m.	0.3/3	1.69	—N/a	—N/a	—N/a	—N/a	
10	"Finale: The Sky's The Limit"	May 11, 2022	Wednesday 9:00 p.m.	0.2/2	1.37	—N/a	—N/a	—N/a	—N/a	
