= Jeopardy! National College Championship =

American Quiz show tournament

- Genre: Game show
- Based on: Jeopardy! by Merv Griffin
- Directed by: Clay Jacobsen; Lucinda Owens Margolis
- Presented by: Mayim Bialik
- Narrated by: Johnny Gilbert
- Theme music composer: Benjamin Sturley (Bleeding Fingers Music) (Note: Original theme composed by Merv Griffin)
- Country of origin: United States
- Original language: English
- No. of seasons: 1
- No. of episodes: 9

Production
- Executive producer: Michael Davies
- Production locations: Alex Trebek Stage; Sony Pictures Studios, Culver City
- Production company: Sony Pictures Television Studios

Original release
- Network: ABC
- Release: February 8 – February 22, 2022

Jeopardy! National College Championship is a special tournament series of the quiz show Jeopardy! that aired on ABC from February 8 to 22, 2022.

== Format ==
Participants enter 12 quarterfinal games, with 2 games broadcast per episode. Winners of every game advance to the semifinals and eliminated players receive a $10,000 consolation prize. The 12 semifinalists are then split into 4 matches, with the top 3 scorers entering the finals. The bottom 7 semifinalists receive a prize of $20,000, whilst the 4th place receives a $35,000 prize and entry into the daily show's upcoming Second Chance Tournament later in 2022. The highest scorer of the 2-game final receives the 1st place prize of $250,000, and an entry into the Tournament of Champions, 2nd place receives $100,000 and 3rd place receives $50,000. Unlike the regular College Championship, there are no wild card spots for high-scorers among non-winners; it was "win or go home".

== Contestants ==
The 36 contestants were announced on February 2, 2022.

Name	University	Year	Major(s)	Residence	Outcome	Ref.
Jaskaran Singh	University of Texas at Austin	Senior	Finance and economics	Plano, Texas	Finished 1st place in Quarterfinals 8 Finished 1st place in Semifinals 4 Finished 1st place in Finals	
Raymond Goslow	Kennesaw State University	Senior	Geospatial sciences	Austell, Georgia	Finished 1st place in Quarterfinals 9 Finished 1st place in Semifinals 1 Finished 2nd place in Finals	
Liz Feltner	Northeastern University	Senior	Political science and business administration	Baton Rouge, Louisiana	Finished 1st place in Quarterfinals 7 Finished 1st place in Semifinals 3 Finished 3rd place in Finals	
Isaac Applebaum	Stanford University	Junior	Computational biology	Bethesda, Maryland	Finished 1st place in Quarterfinals 1 Finished 1st place in Semifinals 2 Finished 4th place in Finals	
Megan Sullivan	University of Virginia	Junior	Classics	Burke, Virginia	Finished 1st place in Quarterfinals 12; Finished 2nd place in Semifinals 4	
Joey Kornman	Brandeis University	Junior	Economics and classical studies	West Hartford, Connecticut	Finished 1st place in Quarterfinals 4 Finished 3rd place in Semifinals 4	
Kristin Donegan	Carnegie Mellon University	Senior	Biological sciences	Towson, Maryland	Finished 1st place in Quarterfinals 10; Finished 2nd place in Semifinals 3	
Emmey Harris	University of Minnesota	Sophomore	History	Lincoln, Nebraska	Finished 1st place in Quarterfinals 3 Finished 3rd place in Semifinals 3	
Stephen Privat	Louisiana State University	Junior	Political science	Lafayette, Louisiana	Finished 1st place in Quarterfinals 2 Finished 2nd place in Semifinals 2	
Lauren Rodriguez	Pomona College	Senior	Public policy and sociology	Moraga, California	Finished 1st place in Quarterfinals 6 Finished 3rd place in Semifinals 2	
Nam Vu	Georgetown University	Senior	Environmental biology	Farmingdale, New Jersey	Finished 1st place in Quarterfinals 11; Finished 2nd place in Semifinals 1	
Neha Seshadri	Harvard University	Senior	Economics	Ann Arbor, Michigan	Finished 1st place in Quarterfinals 5 Finished 3rd place in Semifinals 1	
Aniket Dehadrai	Massachusetts Institute of Technology	Senior	Chemistry and biology	Norman, Oklahoma	Finished 2nd place in Quarterfinals 12	
Sam Blum	Vanderbilt University	Senior	Engineering science	Aventura, Florida	Finished 3rd place in Quarterfinals 12	
Claire Jackson	Spelman College	Sophomore	English and Spanish	Oakland, California	Finished 2nd place in Quarterfinals 11	
Fiona Hellerman	Tulane University	Senior	International relations and philosophy	Glenview, Illinois	Finished 3rd place in Quarterfinals 11	
Sebastian Torres	Yale University	Junior	Ethics, politics, and economics	Tampa, Florida	Finished 2nd place in Quarterfinals 10	
Anna Muthalaly	Duke University	Junior	Public policy	Hoover, Alabama	Finished 3rd place in Quarterfinals 10	
Lucy Greenman	College of William & Mary	Senior	Health analytics	Sterling, Virginia	Finished 2nd place in Quarterfinals 9	
Jeric Brual	New York University	Senior	Film and TV	Union, New Jersey	Finished 3rd place in Quarterfinals 9	
Sarah Salisbury	University of Southern California	Sophomore	English	La Mesa, California	Finished 2nd place in Quarterfinals 8	
Max Niles	Brown University	Senior	History and public policy	Washington, D.C.	Finished 3rd place in Quarterfinals 8	
Kaden Lee	University of Washington	Junior	Aeronautical and astronautical engineering	Medical Lake, Washington	Finished 2nd place in Quarterfinals 7	
Jess Agyepong	Howard University	Senior	Biology	Silver Spring, Maryland	Finished 3rd place in Quarterfinals 7	
Elijah Odunade	University of Georgia	Junior	Political science	Norcross, Georgia	Finished 2nd place in Quarterfinals 6	
Matt Downing	University of Notre Dame	Senior	Marketing and applied mathematics	Ronkonkoma, New York	Finished 3rd place in Quarterfinals 6	
Pauline Bisaccio	Clemson University	Junior	Biochemistry and psychology	Fort Mill, South Carolina	Finished 2nd place in Quarterfinals 5	
Chance Persons	Creighton University	Sophomore	Physics and chemistry	Burnsville, Minnesota	Finished 3rd place in Quarterfinals 5	
Yejun Kim	Northwestern University	Senior	Chemical engineering	Naperville, Illinois	Finished 2nd place in Quarterfinals 4	
Mitch Macek	Villanova University	Sophomore	Mathematics and education	Felton, Pennsylvania	Finished 3rd place in Quarterfinals 4	
Mehek Boparai	University of Pennsylvania	Senior	English	Hanford, California	Finished 2nd place in Quarterfinals 3	
Toussaint Pegues	California Institute of Technology	Senior	Mechanical engineering	Dallas, Texas	Finished 3rd place in Quarterfinals 3	
Jasmine Manansala	Rice University	Junior	Computer science and cognitive science	San Antonio, Texas	Finished 2nd place in Quarterfinals 2	
Ella Feiner	Princeton University	Senior	Chemical and biological engineering	Ridgewood, New Jersey	Finished 3rd place in Quarterfinals 2	
Gus Guszkowski	Dartmouth College	Senior	Classics	Pomfret Center, Connecticut	Finished 2nd place in Quarterfinals 1	
Catherine Zhang	Cornell University	Senior	Computer science and sociology	Pennington, New Jersey	Finished 3rd place in Quarterfinals 1	

== Production ==
On August 11, 2021, it was announced that ABC had ordered the series with Mayim Bialik as the host and Mike Richards as the executive producer. Richards was dismissed and replaced by Michael Davies on August 31 of the same year. On December 2, 2021, it was announced that the series would premiere on February 8, 2022.

== Episodes ==
No.	Title	Winner(s)	Winner(s)' score	Original release date	U.S. viewers (millions)	Rating (18–49)
1	"Quarterfinals 1"	Applebaum; Privat	$16,401 $14,300	February 8, 2022	4.28	0.6
2	"Quarterfinals 2"	Harris; Kornman	$21,000 $17,201	February 9, 2022	4.57	0.5
3	"Quarterfinals 3"	Seshadri; Rodriguez	$14,801 $20,300	February 10, 2022	4.51	0.6
4	"Quarterfinals 4"	Feltner; Singh	$16,800 $19,900	February 11, 2022	4.60	0.6
5	"Quarterfinals 5"	Goslow; Donegan	$26,021 $9,999	February 15, 2022	4.14	0.5
6	"Quarterfinals 6"	Vu; Sullivan	$17,000 $8,401	February 16, 2022	4.64	0.5
7	"Semifinals 1"	Goslow; Applebaum	$20,779 $18,801	February 17, 2022	4.82	0.6
8	"Semifinals 2"	Feltner; Singh	$22,000 $24,400	February 18, 2022	4.73	0.5
9	"The Finals"	Singh	$51,700	February 22, 2022	5.72	0.8

== Match summaries ==
Game No.	Date	Contestant 1	Contestant 2	Contestant 3
Quarterfinals 1	February 8, 2022	Applebaum ($16,401)	Guszkowski ($5,999)	Zhang ($5,200)
Quarterfinals 2	February 8, 2022	Feiner ($0)	Manansala ($12,399)	Privat ($14,300)
Quarterfinals 3	February 9, 2022	Pegues ($1)	Harris ($21,000)	Boparai ($1,199)
Quarterfinals 4	February 9, 2022	Kim ($6,000)	Macek ($0)	Kornman ($17,201)
Quarterfinals 5	February 10, 2022	Bisaccio ($8,601)	Persons ($0)	Seshadri ($14,801)
Quarterfinals 6	February 10, 2022	Rodriguez ($20,300)	Downing (−$1,200)	Odunade ($3,800)
Quarterfinals 7	February 11, 2022	Agyepong ($0)	Feltner ($16,800)	Lee ($3,400)
Quarterfinals 8	February 11, 2022	Singh ($19,900)	Niles ($0)	Salisbury ($18,000)
Quarterfinals 9	February 15, 2022	Greenman ($16,000)	Goslow ($26,021)	Brual ($8,001)
Quarterfinals 10	February 15, 2022	Torres ($200)	Muthalaly (−$2,000)	Donegan ($9,999)
Quarterfinals 11	February 16, 2022	Hellerman ($1,000)	Vu ($17,000)	Jackson ($3,119)
Quarterfinals 12	February 16, 2022	Blum ($1,598)	Dehadrai ($4,200)	Sullivan ($8,401)
Semifinals 1	February 17, 2022	Vu ($8,881)	Seshadri ($999)	Goslow ($20,779)
Semifinals 2	February 17, 2022	Rodriguez ($3,599)	Applebaum ($18,801)	Privat ($3,602)
Semifinals 3	February 18, 2022	Donegan ($22,000)	Feltner ($22,000)	Harris ($21,600)
Semifinals 4	February 18, 2022	Kornman ($0)	Singh ($24,400)	Sullivan ($3,599)
Finals	February 22, 2022	Feltner ($7,400) [$5,800 + $1,600]	Singh ($51,700) [$32,400 + $19,300]	Goslow ($46,999) [$13,200 + $33,799]

== See also ==
- Strategies and skills of Jeopardy! champions
