= The Courtship =

American reality TV show

- Genre: Dating game show
- Presented by: Rick Edwards
- Starring: Nicole Remy
- Country of origin: United States
- Original language: English
- No. of seasons: 1
- No. of episodes: 13

Production
- Executive producers: Sharon Levy; DJ Nurre; Michael Heyerman; Anthony Dominici; Shyam Balsé; Susy Price; Andy Cadman
- Production companies: Endemol Shine North America; Shine TV

Original release
- Network: NBC (episodes 1–2); USA Network (episodes 3–13)
- Release: March 6 – May 25, 2022

The Courtship is an American reality television dating game show that premiered on NBC on March 6, 2022.

== Court ==
- Mr. Claude Remy (Father)
- Dr. Claire Spain-Remy (Mother)
- Mrs. Danielle "Danie" Baker (Sister)
- Ms. Tessa Cleary (Best Friend)

== Contestants ==
The contestants were revealed on February 14, 2022.

Name	Hometown	Outcome	Place	Ref
Mr. Daniel Bochicchio	Staten Island, New York	Winner (Episode 13)	1st	
Mr. Jesse Judge	Strongsville, Ohio	Runner-up (Episode 13)	2nd	
Mr. Christian Lee Cones	Los Angeles, California	Eliminated (Episode 12)	3rd	
Mr. Lincoln Chapman	Nashville, Tennessee	Eliminated (Episode 11)	4th	
Mr. Miles Nazaire	Chelsea, London	Eliminated (Episode 10)	5th	
Mr. Daniel "Dan" Hunter	Los Angeles, California	Eliminated (Episode 9)	6th	
Mr. Jaquan Holland	Los Angeles, California	Eliminated (Episode 8)	7th	
Mr. Charlie Mumbray	Kent, South East England	Eliminated (Episode 8)	8th	
Capt. Danny Kim	Seoul, South Korea	Eliminated (Episode 6)	9th	
Dr. Tim Hatem	Belfast, Northern Ireland	Eliminated (Episode 5)	10th	
Mr. Giuseppe Castronovo	Point Pleasant, New Jersey	Eliminated (Episode 4)	11th	
Mr. Nate Shanklin	Sacramento, California	Eliminated (Episode 4)	12th	
Mr. Alex "Achilles" King	San Diego, California	Eliminated (Episode 3)	13th	
Mr. Peter Saffa	Defiance, Missouri	Eliminated (Episode 3)	14th	
Mr. Derek Kesseler	Vancouver, British Columbia, Canada	Eliminated (Episode 2)	15th	
Mr. Chandler "Chan" Luxe	West Hollywood, California	Eliminated (Episode 2)	16th	
Dr. Jarrett Schanzer	Miami, Florida	Eliminated (Episode 1)	17th	
Mr. Lewis Echavarria	Miami, Florida	Eliminated (Episode 1)	18th	
Mr. Caleb Ward	Hampton, Virginia	Eliminated (Episode 1)	19th	

== Elimination chart ==
Legend
The contestant won The Courtship
The contestant was the runner-up
The contestant was safe
The contestant was introduced and safe
The contestant was introduced yet was up for elimination but received a dance card
The contestant was up for elimination but received a dance card
The contestant was eliminated from the competition

Contestants	Episode 1	Episode 2	Episode 3	Episode 4	Episode 5	Episode 6	Episode 7	Episode 8	Episode 9	Episode 10	Episode 11	Episodes 12/13
Mr. Daniel Bochicchio	Safe	Safe	Safe	Dance Card	Safe	Dance Card	Safe	Safe	Safe	Safe	Dance Card	Winner
Mr. Jesse Judge	N/A		Safe	Safe	Dance Card	Safe	Dance Card	Safe	Safe	Dance Card	Dance Card	Runner- Up
Mr. Christian Lee Cones	Safe	Dance Card	Safe	Safe	Safe	Safe	Safe	Safe	Dance Card	Safe	Dance Card	Eliminated
Mr. Lincoln Chapman	Safe	Safe	Dance Card	Safe	Safe	Safe	Safe	Dance Card	Dance Card	Safe	Eliminated	
Mr. Miles Nazaire	N/A						Dance Card	Safe	Safe	Eliminated		
Mr. Daniel "Dan" Hunter	Safe	Safe	Safe	Safe	Dance Card	Safe	Safe	Dance Card	Eliminated			
Mr. Jaquan Holland	Safe	Safe	Safe	Safe	Safe	Safe	Dance Card	Eliminated				
Mr. Charlie Mumbray	Safe	Dance Card	Safe	Safe	Safe	Dance Card	Safe	Eliminated				
Capt. Danny Kim	Dance Card	Dance Card	Safe	Dance Card	Safe	Eliminated						
Dr. Tim Hatem	N/A		Safe	Safe	Eliminated							
Mr. Giuseppe Castronovo	Safe	Safe	Dance Card	Eliminated								
Mr. Nate Shanklin	Safe	Safe	Dance Card	Eliminated								
Mr. Alex "Achilles" King	Safe	Safe	Eliminated									
Mr. Peter Saffa	Dance Card	Safe	Eliminated									
Mr. Derek Kesseler	Safe	Eliminated										
Mr. Chandler "Chan" Luxe	Dance Card	Eliminated										
Dr. Jarrett Schanzer	Eliminated											
Mr. Lewis Echavarria	Eliminated											
Mr. Caleb Ward	Eliminated											

== Production ==
On July 7, 2021, it was announced that Peacock had made a series order for a dating show titled Pride & Prejudice: An Experiment in Romance. On February 1, 2022, it was announced that the series, titled The Courtship, will move to NBC and premiere on March 6, 2022. On February 14, 2022, the leading lady and suitors were announced. On March 16, 2022, the series was moved from NBC to USA Network due to low ratings.

== Episodes ==
No.	Title	Original release date	U.S. viewers (millions)
NBC
1	"First Impressions"	March 6, 2022	0.99
Ms. Nicole Remy, a woman tired of modern dating, is transported to Regency-era England in the hope of finding love; at a 19th-century English castle, 16 eligible suitors arrive to attempt to win Ms. Remy's heart and the approval of her trusted court.
2	"Acts of Chivalry"	March 13, 2022	0.62
The suitors join Ms. Rémy and her court for a day at the lake and attempt to out-romance one another with acts of chivalry in hopes of impressing Mr. and Dr. Rémy; at the weekly farewell ball, Ms. Rémy reveals whose journey is ending.
USA Network
3	"Test of Sportsmanship"	March 24, 2022	0.08
The suitors attempt to win Ms. Rémy's good favour while displaying gentlemanly sportsmanship in a spirited game of cricket; one suitor, however, takes his eye off the ball and sets off a scandal that ends in an explosive Farewell Ball.
4	"Two New Suitors"	March 30, 2022	0.14
Tensions run high with the arrival of two surprise guests; at a country fair, the suitors fervently try to win Ms. Rémy's affection; after a flirty fencing date, Ms. Rémy must decide who to send home.
5	"Table Manners"	April 6, 2022	0.11
A mysterious arrival turns the castle on its head; the competition heats up at a Regency-era archery event; a private dinner is rudely interrupted by one suitor who sends Ms. Rémy into a tailspin.
6	"Parents on Leave"	April 13, 2022	0.13
A suitor sneaks into the castle causing rumours to start swirling during a wild party; one deserving suitor is selected for a private solo date in the garden and deep trauma surfaces during their time together.
7	"A French Kiss"	April 20, 2022	0.13
Suitors reveal their secrets at the masquerade ball; a high-society stranger arrives to romance Ms. Rémy, which ruffles the suitors' feathers and ignites a battle of the Brits.
8	"Battle of the Brits"	April 27, 2022	0.11
Mr. and Mrs. Rémy return to host an exquisite dinner for Ms. Rémy and her suitors; uncomfortable secrets are revealed at the invite-only Parlour Games; Ms. Remy puts the eligible bachelors to the test during clay pigeon shooting.
9	"The Strongest Prevail"	May 4, 2022	0.18
The remaining suitors display their physical prowess and stamina at the Festival of Strength, in order to win private time with Ms. Rémy; as one suitor's intentions are questioned, Ms. Rémy has to decide who and what to believe.
10	"Carousel of Events"	May 11, 2022	0.10
Ms. Rémy and her court grill the remaining five suitors on commitment. At a 19th Century Pleasure Garden, fortunes are told and feelings are exposed. Later, a telling conversation in the gentlemen's parlour reveals not everything is as it seems.
11	"A Secret Revealed"	May 18, 2022	0.13
Ms. Rémy's final four suitors must demonstrate just how hard they're willing to work for love. A regency style brunch is interrupted with a heartbreaking revelation. Who will Ms. Rémy bid adieu this week?
12 (Part 1) 13 (Part 2)	"Commitment of a Lifetime"	May 25, 2022	0.12
The final three suitors get the opportunity to impress Ms. Rémy in the modern world, but only two can return to the Regency era for a glittering ball where the Court will decide which of the final two deserve their blessing.

== Reception ==
Viewership and ratings per episode of The Courtship
No.	Title	Air date	Timeslot (ET)	Rating (18–49)	Viewers (millions)	DVR (18–49)	DVR viewers (millions)	Total (18–49)	Total viewers (millions)
1	"First Impressions"	March 6, 2022	Sunday 8:00 p.m.	0.2	0.99	TBD	TBD	TBD	TBD
2	"Acts of Chivalry"	March 13, 2022	Sunday 8:00 p.m.	0.1	0.62	TBD	TBD	TBD	TBD
3	"Test of Sportsmanship"	March 24, 2022	Thursday 12:01 a.m.	0.0	0.08	TBD	TBD	TBD	TBD
4	"Two New Suitors"	March 30, 2022	Wednesday 11:01 p.m.	0.1	0.14	TBD	TBD	TBD	TBD
5	"Table Manners"	April 6, 2022	Wednesday 11:01 p.m.	0.0	0.11	TBD	TBD	TBD	TBD
6	"Parents on Leave"	April 13, 2022	Wednesday 11:01 p.m.	0.0	0.13	TBD	TBD	TBD	TBD
7	"A French Kiss"	April 20, 2022	Wednesday 11:01 p.m.	0.1	0.13	TBD	TBD	TBD	TBD
8	"Battle of the Brits"	April 27, 2022	Wednesday 11:12 p.m.	0.0	0.11	TBD	TBD	TBD	TBD
9	"The Strongest Prevail"	May 4, 2022	Wednesday 11:06 p.m.	0.1	0.18	TBD	TBD	TBD	TBD
10	"Carousel of Events"	May 11, 2022	Wednesday 11:01 p.m.	0.0	0.10	TBD	TBD	TBD	TBD
11	"A Secret Revealed"	May 18, 2022	Wednesday 11:01 p.m.	0.0	0.13	TBD	TBD	TBD	TBD
12/13	"Commitment of a Lifetime"	May 25, 2022	Wednesday 11:33 p.m.	0.0	0.12	TBD	TBD	TBD	TBD
