= Come Dance with Me (TV series) =

American reality television dance competition show

- Created by: Reinout Oerlemans; LL Cool J; Chris O'Donnell
- Presented by: Philip Lawrence
- Judges: Jenna Dewan; Dexter Mayfield; Tricia Miranda
- Country of origin: United States
- Original language: English
- No. of seasons: 1
- No. of episodes: 11

Production
- Executive producers: LL Cool J; Chris O'Donnell; Reinout Oerlemans; Ross Weintraub; Jeff Altrock; Jeff Thacker; Nick Florez; RJ Durell
- Production companies: George Street Productions; CBS Studios; JamTV Australia (uncredited); LL Cool J, Inc.; 3 Ball Entertainment

Original release
- Network: CBS
- Release: April 15 – June 24, 2022

Come Dance with Me is an American reality competition television series that aired on CBS from April 15 to June 24, 2022. The show pairs young dancers with a family member that has supported their training, and the pair perform a dance together for a panel of judges before the determining who continues to the next round. The show was created by LL Cool J, Chris O'Donnell, and Reinout Oerlemans.

== History ==
Come Dance with Me began as a pitch by Reinout Oerlemans for a new family-based dance competition show. Chris O'Donnell was friends with Oerlemans, and he was reading about the pitch while on set working NCIS: Los Angeles. O'Donnell's co-star LL Cool J caught wind of it and expressed interest himself. The two decided that they would help create the show together.

== Show format ==
Talented young dancers team up with an untrained adult family member who has encouraged their dance training. Each week, the pairs learn a dance routine from various dance styles and perform it for a panel of judges. The two lowest-scoring teams then perform a freestyle dance-off to determine which team is eliminated.

=== Judges and hosts ===
Songwriter Philip Lawrence hosted the show. Jenna Dewan was the first judge to join the show bringing her experience as a dancer with Janet Jackson and hosting World of Dance. She was joined on the judges panel by plus-size model Dexter Mayfield and Tricia Miranda, a hip hop choreographer.

=== Contestants ===
Contestant	Age	Partner	Hometown	Status	Ref.
Maceo Sicam	14	Albert Sicam (father)	Santa Clarita, California	Withdrew on April 15, 2022	
Lucas Valazquez	13	Carolina Valazquez (mother)	La Mirada, California	Eliminated 1st on April 22, 2022	
Ava Otto	10	John Otto (father)	Santa Clarita, California	Eliminated 2nd on May 6, 2022	
Saeda McKoy	11	Shamus McKoy (father)	Mesa, Arizona	Eliminated 3rd on May 13, 2022	
Emelyn Yniguez	12	Nicole Yniguez (mother)	Las Vegas, Nevada	Eliminated 4th on May 20, 2022	
Noah Ross	15	Sylvia Ross (mother)	Santa Clarita, California	Eliminated 5th on May 27, 2022	
Connor Wayment	13	Nadya Wayment (mother)	Ogden, Utah	Eliminated 6th on June 3, 2022	
Kamryn Smith	9	Adriana Smith (mother)	Phoenix, Arizona	Eliminated 7th on June 10, 2022	
Mia Clark	10	Crystal Clark (mother)	Lexington, South Carolina	Eliminated 8th on June 17, 2022	
Emily Tatoosi	12	Anna Tatoosi (mother)	Woodland Hills, California	Third place on June 24, 2022	
Avery Khoundara	11	Jack Khoundara (father)	Phoenix, Arizona	Runners-up on June 24, 2022	
Kennedy Rae Thompson	10	Justin Thompson (father)	Stafford, Virginia	Winners on June 24, 2022	

== Scoring charts ==
The highest score each week is indicated in bold green with a dagger (†), while the lowest score each week is indicated in italicized red with a double-dagger (‡).

Color key:

Winners
Runners-up
Third place
Bottom two
Withdrew from competition
Eliminated

Come Dance with Me - Weekly scores
Couple	Pl.	Week											
Couple	Pl.	1	2	3			4	5	6	7	8	9	10
Couple	Pl.	1	2	Part 1	Part 2	1+2	4	5	6	7	8	9	10
Kennedy & Justin	1st	**25**†	24	25		25	22	22.5 (Note: This couple was in the bottom two, but was not eliminated.)	25.5	**30**†	25.5‡	29+28.5=57.5	30+30=**60**† (Note: This couple finished in first place.)
Avery & Jack	2nd	21	19	21.5		21.5	21.5	**26.5**†	25	29	27.5	28.5+28.5=57	28.5+29=57.5 (Note: This couple finished in second place.)
Emily & Anna	3rd	23.5	24	**25.5**†		**25.5**†	24.5	26	22.5	26.5	**30**†	30+28=**58**†	27+27=54‡ (Note: This couple finished in third place.)
Mia & Crystal	4th	**25**†	22.5		24.5	24.5	24	25	24	25.5	28	25.5+25.5=51‡ (Note: This couple was eliminated.)	
Kamryn & Adriana	5th	22	**24.5**†	22.5		22.5	**25**†	24.5	**27**†	25	27.5		
Connor & Nadya	6th	21.5	17.5‡	20‡		20‡	24.5	25.5	25.5	22.5‡			
Noah & Sylvia	7th	21.5	20.5		21‡	21	23.5	24	21‡				
Emelyn & Nicole	8th	22	22		**25.5**†	**25.5**†	22.5	21.5‡					
Saeda & Shamus	9th	21	21.5		25	25	20.5‡						
Ava & John	10th	18‡	20.5		21‡	21							
Lucas & Carolina	11th	18.5	17.5‡										
Maceo & Albert	12th	— (Note: This couple withdrew from the competition.)											

== Weekly scores ==
Individual judges' scores in the charts below (given in parentheses) are listed in this order from left to right: Tricia Miranda, Jenna Dewan, Dexter Mayfield.

=== Week 1: First Dances ===
Due to Albert's foot injury, he and Maceo had to withdraw from the competition. Maceo performed the dance routine during the live show with his choreographer Gabe De Guzman as a stand-in. There was no additional elimination.

Come Dance with Me - Week 1
Couple	Scores	Music	Result
Kennedy & Justin	25 (8, 8.5, 8.5)	"Carousel"—Melanie Martinez	Safe
Emily & Anna	23.5 (7, 8, 8.5)	"Rain on Me"—Lady Gaga & Ariana Grande	Safe
Saeda & Shamus	21 (7, 7, 7)	"Control"—Zoe Wees	Safe
Avery & Jack	21 (7, 6.5, 7.5)	"Walking on Sunshine"—Katrina and the Waves	Safe
Connor & Nadya	21.5 (6.5, 7.5, 7.5)	"We Will Rock You"—Queen	Safe
Kamryn & Adriana	22 (6.5, 7, 8.5)	"Grown Woman"—Beyoncé	Safe
Ava & John	18 (5.5, 6, 6.5)	"Ain't No Sunshine"—Eva Cassidy	Bottom two
Noah & Sylvia	21.5 (6.5, 7, 8)	"I'll Be There"—Mac Miller feat. Phonte	Safe
Mia & Crystal	25 (7.5, 9, 8.5)	"Attention"—Todrick Hall	Safe
Lucas & Carolina	18.5 (5.5, 6.5, 6.5)	"L-O-V-E"—Nat King Cole	Bottom two
Emelyn & Nicole	22 (7, 7.5, 7.5)	"Burnitup!"—Janet Jackson feat. Missy Elliott	Safe
Maceo & Albert	N/A	"Mama Said Knock You Out"—LL Cool J	Withdrew

=== Week 2: Pop Night ===
Come Dance with Me - Week 2
Couple	Scores	Music	Result
Avery & Jack	19 (6.5, 6, 6.5)	"Uptown Funk"—Mark Ronson feat. Bruno Mars	Safe
Emelyn & Nicole	22 (7.5, 7, 7.5)	"Anytime You Need a Friend"—Mariah Carey	Safe
Saeda & Shamus	21.5 (7.5, 7, 7)	"What a Man Gotta Do"—Jonas Brothers	Safe
Mia & Crystal	22.5 (7.5, 7.5, 7.5)	"Hurts 2B Human"—Pink feat. Khalid	Safe
Kennedy & Justin	24 (8, 8, 8)	"Applause"—Lady Gaga	Safe
Ava & John	20.5 (6.5, 7, 7)	"Rollin'"—Limp Bizkit	Safe
Kamryn & Adriana	24.5 (8, 8, 8.5)	"Up"—Cardi B	Safe
Connor & Nadya	17.5 (5.5, 5.5, 6.5)	"Bad Guy"—Billie Eilish	Bottom two
Noah & Sylvia	20.5 (6.5, 7, 7)	"Heads Will Roll"—Yeah Yeah Yeahs	Safe
Lucas & Carolina	17.5 (6, 5.5, 6)	"Mi Gente"—J Balvin & Willy William	Eliminated
Emily & Anna	24 (8, 8, 8)	"Skyscraper"—Demi Lovato	Safe

Showout
Couple	Music	Result
Connor & Nadya	"Bang Bang"—Jessie J, Ariana Grande & Nicki Minaj	Winners (2 judge votes)
Lucas & Carolina	"Bang Bang"—Jessie J, Ariana Grande & Nicki Minaj	Losers

Judges' votes to save

- Mayfield: Connor & Nadya
- Miranda: Lucas & Carolina
- Dewan: Connor & Nadya

=== Week 3: Bust a Groove Night ===
Part 1

Come Dance with Me - Week 3 (Part 1)
Couple	Scores	Music	Result
Emily & Anna	25.5 (8.5, 8.5, 8.5)	"Dance Monkey"—Tones and I	Safe
Kennedy & Justin	25 (8.5, 8.5, 8)	"Shake Your Groove Thing"—Peaches & Herb	Safe
Avery & Jack	21.5 (7, 7.5, 7)	"Gonna Make You Sweat (Everybody Dance Now)"—C+C Music Factory	Safe
Connor & Nadya	20 (6.5, 7, 6.5)	"Dance, Dance"—Fall Out Boy	Bottom two
Kamryn & Adriana	22.5 (7.5, 7.5, 7.5)	"On the Floor"—Jennifer Lopez feat. Pitbull	Safe

(Part 2)

Come Dance with Me - Week 3 (Part 2)
Couple	Scores	Music	Result
Mia & Crystal	24.5 (8, 8, 8.5)	"The Safety Dance"—Men Without Hats	Safe
Ava & John	21 (7, 7, 7)	"Pump Up the Jam"—Technotronic	Eliminated
Emelyn & Nicole	25.5 (8.5, 8.5, 8.5)	"Cheap Thrills"—Sia	Safe
Noah & Sylvia	21 (7, 7, 7)	"Level Up"—Ciara	Safe from the Showout (3 judge votes)
Saeda & Shamus	25 (8.5, 8.5, 8)	"Can't Stop the Feeling!"—Justin Timberlake	Safe

Showout
Couple	Music	Result
Connor & Nadya	"Bust a Move"—Young MC	Winners (3 judge votes)
Ava & John	"Bust a Move"—Young MC	Losers

Judges' votes to save

- Mayfield: Connor & Nadya
- Miranda: Connor & Nadya
- Dewan: Connor & Nadya

=== Week 4: Picture This ===
Come Dance with Me - Week 4
Couple	Scores	Music	Result
Mia & Crystal	24 (8, 8, 8)	"Party Rock Anthem"—LMFAO feat. Lauren Bennett & GoonRock	Safe
Avery & Jack	21.5 (7.5, 7, 7)	"Somewhere Over the Rainbow"—Israel Kamakawiwoʻole	Bottom two
Noah & Sylvia	23.5 (8, 8, 7.5)	"Beautiful"—Snoop Dogg feat. Pharrell Williams & Uncle Charlie Wilson	Safe
Emelyn & Nicole	22.5 (7.5, 7.5, 7.5)	"Me Too"—Meghan Trainor	Safe
Kamryn & Adriana	25 (8.5, 8, 8.5)	"Scars to Your Beautiful"—Alessia Cara	Safe
Kennedy & Justin	22 (7, 7.5, 7.5)	"On Broadway"—George Benson	Safe
Saeda & Shamus	20.5 (6.5, 7, 7)	"Dance with My Father"—Luther Vandross	Eliminated
Emily & Anna	24.5 (8.5, 8, 8)	"Ice Cream"—Blackpink & Selena Gomez	Safe
Connor & Nadya	24.5 (8.5, 8, 8)	"Fight Song"—Rachel Platten	Safe

Showout
Couple	Music	Result
Avery & Jack	"Where Are Ü Now"—Jack Ü with Justin Bieber	Winners (2 judge votes)
Saeda & Shamus	"Where Are Ü Now"—Jack Ü with Justin Bieber	Losers

Judges' votes to save

- Miranda: Avery & Jack
- Mayfield: Saeda & Shamus
- Dewan: Avery & Jack

=== Week 5: #Throwback ===
Come Dance with Me - Week 5
Couple	Scores	Music	Result
Mia & Crystal	25 (8.5, 8, 8.5)	"Le Freak"—Chic	Safe
Connor & Nadya	25.5 (8.5, 8.5, 8.5)	"It Takes Two"—Rob Base and DJ E-Z Rock	Safe
Emily & Anna	26 (8.5, 8.5, 9)	"Puttin' On the Ritz"—Robbie Williams	Safe
Kennedy & Justin	22.5 (7.5, 7.5, 7.5)	"Hypnotize"—The Notorious B.I.G.	Bottom two
Noah & Sylvia	24 (8, 8, 8)	"Pray to God"—Calvin Harris feat. Haim	Safe
Emelyn & Nicole	21.5 (7, 7, 7.5)	"Livin' la Vida Loca"—Ricky Martin	Eliminated
Kamryn & Adriana	24.5 (8, 8, 8.5)	"These Boots Are Made for Walkin'"—The Supremes	Safe
Avery & Jack	26.5 (9, 9, 8.5)	"Rock Me Amadeus (Salieri Mix)"—Falco	Safe

Showout
Couple	Music	Result
Kennedy & Justin	"Tootsee Roll"—69 Boyz	Winners (2 judge votes)
Emelyn & Nicole	"Tootsee Roll"—69 Boyz	Losers

Judges' votes to save

- Mayfield: Kennedy & Justin
- Miranda: Emelyn & Nicole
- Dewan: Kennedy & Justin

=== Week 6: Musical Magic ===
Jenna Dewan, along with choreographer Robert Roldan, did a dance to "Falling Slowly" by her fiancé Steve Kazee.

Come Dance with Me - Week 6
Couple	Scores	Music	Result
Kennedy & Justin	25.5 (9, 8.5, 8)	"A Brand New Day"—The Wiz: Original Motion Picture Soundtrack	Safe
Mia & Crystal	24 (8, 8, 8)	"You Can't Stop the Beat (Medley)"—Hairspray: Original Broadway Cast Recording	Safe
Connor & Nadya	25.5 (8.5, 8.5, 8.5)	"It's Still Rock and Roll to Me"—Billy Joel	Safe
Emily & Anna	22.5 (7.5, 7.5, 7.5)	"The Greatest Show"—Panic! at the Disco	Bottom two
Avery & Jack	25 (8.5, 8, 8.5)	"Seize The Day"—Newsies (Original Motion Picture Soundtrack)	Safe
Noah & Sylvia	21 (7, 7, 7)	"Another Day of Sun"—La La Land: Original Motion Picture Soundtrack	Eliminated
Kamryn & Adriana	27 (9, 9, 9)	"Hot Honey Rag"—Chicago The Musical (New London Cast Recording (1997))	Safe

Showout
Couple	Music	Result
Emily & Anna	"A Little Party Never Killed Nobody (All We Got)"—Fergie, Q-Tip & GoonRock	Winners (3 judge votes)
Noah & Sylvia	"A Little Party Never Killed Nobody (All We Got)"—Fergie, Q-Tip & GoonRock	Losers

Judges' votes to save

- Dewan: Emily & Anna
- Miranda: Emily & Anna
- Mayfield: Emily & Anna

=== Week 7: Jet-Setters ===
Come Dance with Me - Week 7
Couple	Scores	Music	Result
Emily & Anna	26.5 (9, 9, 8.5)	"Mambo"—Nikki Vianna	Safe
Connor & Nadya	22.5 (7.5, 7.5, 7.5)	"Dynamite"—BTS	Eliminated
Mia & Crystal	25.5 (8.5, 8.5, 8.5)	"Despacito"—Luis Fonsi & Daddy Yankee	Safe
Avery & Jack	29 (10, 9.5, 9.5)	"Lights"—Ellie Goulding	Safe
Kamryn & Adriana	25 (8.5, 8, 8.5)	"How Far I'll Go"—Kurt Hugo Schneider & Diamond White	Bottom two
Kennedy & Justin	30 (10, 10, 10)	"Santa María (Del Buen Ayre)"—Gotan Project	Safe

Showout
Couple	Music	Result
Connor & Nadya	"Let's Get Loud"—Jennifer Lopez	Losers
Kamryn & Adriana	"Let's Get Loud"—Jennifer Lopez	Winners (3 judge votes)

Judges' votes to save

- Mayfield: Kamryn & Adriana
- Miranda: Kamryn & Adriana
- Dewan: Kamryn & Adriana

=== Week 8: Heroes Night ===
The contestants and choreographers did an opening dance to "The Business" by Tiësto.

Come Dance with Me - Week 8
Couple	Scores	Music	Result
Avery & Jack	27.5 (9.5, 9, 9)	"#thatPOWER"—will.i.am feat. Justin Bieber	Safe from the Showout (2 judge votes)
Mia & Crystal	28 (9.5, 9.5, 9)	"Savage"—Megan Thee Stallion	Safe
Kennedy & Justin	25.5 (8.5, 8.5, 8.5)	"Heroes (We Could Be)"—Alesso feat. Tove Lo	Bottom two
Emily & Anna	30 (10, 10, 10)	"The Light Is Coming"—Ariana Grande feat. Nicki Minaj	Safe
Kamryn & Adriana	27.5 (9, 9, 9.5)	"Technologic"—Daft Punk	Eliminated

Showout
Couple	Music	Result
Kennedy & Justin	"Till the World Ends"—Britney Spears	Winners (2 judge votes)
Kamryn & Adriana	"Till the World Ends"—Britney Spears	Losers

Judges' votes to save from the Showout

- Dewan: Avery & Jack
- Mayfield: Kamryn & Adriana
- Miranda: Avery & Jack

Judges' votes to save

- Mayfield: Kamryn & Adriana
- Miranda: Kennedy & Justin
- Dewan: Kennedy & Justin

=== Week 9: Semi-Final (Family Faves) ===
The second dances were scored at the end of the show. The judges' separate scores from the second dances were not shown.

Come Dance with Me - Week 9
Couple	Scores	Music	Result
Mia & Crystal	25.5 (8.5, 9, 8)	"Sushi"—Merk & Kremont	Eliminated
Mia & Crystal	25.5	"A Million Dreams"—Pink	Eliminated
Kennedy & Justin	29 (9.5, 10, 9.5)	"Tiny Dancer"—Elton John	Safe
Kennedy & Justin	28.5	"Dance Like Yo Daddy"—Meghan Trainor	Safe
Emily & Anna	30 (10, 10, 10)	"Bailar (Radio Edit)"—Deorro feat. Elvis Crespo	Safe
Emily & Anna	28	"Her"—Anne-Marie	Safe
Avery & Jack	28.5 (9.5, 9.5, 9.5)	"I Won't Give Up"—Jason Mraz	Safe
Avery & Jack	28.5	"Happy"—Pharrell Williams	Safe

=== Week 10: Grand Finale ===
The finalists, judges and choreographers did an opening dance to "Levitating" by Dua Lipa feat. DaBaby.

The second dances were scored at the end of the show. The judges' separate scores from the second dances were not shown.

Come Dance with Me - Week 10
Couple	Scores	Music	Result
Emily & Anna	27 (9, 9, 9)	"Ice Cream"—Blackpink & Selena Gomez	Third place
Emily & Anna	27	"When I Grow Up"—The Pussycat Dolls	Third place
Kennedy & Justin	30 (10, 10, 10)	"Carousel"—Melanie Martinez	Winners
Kennedy & Justin	30	"The Greatest"—Sia	Winners
Avery & Jack	28.5 (9.5, 9.5, 9.5)	"Rock Me Amadeus (Salieri Mix)"—Falco	Runners-up
Avery & Jack	29	"By Your Side"—Calvin Harris feat. Tom Grennan	Runners-up

== Episodes ==
No.	Title	Original release date	Prod. code	U.S. viewers (millions)
1	"The Journey Begins"	April 15, 2022	101	2.05
2	"Pop Night"	April 22, 2022	102	2.24
3	"Bust a Groove Night Part 1"	April 29, 2022	103A	2.52
4	"Bust a Groove Night Part 2"	May 6, 2022	103B	2.12
5	"Picture This"	May 13, 2022	104	2.06
6	"#Throwback"	May 20, 2022	105	2.14
7	"Musical Magic"	May 27, 2022	106	2.39
8	"Jet-Setters"	June 3, 2022	107	2.28
9	"Heroes Night"	June 10, 2022	108	2.17
10	"Semi-Final"	June 17, 2022	109	2.08
11	"Grand Finale"	June 24, 2022	110	2.38

== Reception ==
Reviewing the show for Decider, Joe Keller found the show entertaining but thought the main improvement might have been a smaller number of contestants to streamline the show. He also praised the overall diversity of the contestants, but pointed out a lack of LGBT representation. Overall, Keller recommended the show, saying that it will "melt your heart." It also received a 4/5 rating from Common Sense Media where Melissa Camacho said it "sends a beautiful message about the fact that dancing is for everyone, regardless of gender, body type, or natural talent."

== International versions ==
A Belgian version of the show premiered a few weeks before the American version. The series premiered on Play4 on April 4, 2022, and was hosted by Dutch rapper Gers Pardoel and TikTok star Julie Vermeire.
