= Beyond the Edge (TV series) =

American reality competition show

- Genre: Reality competition
- Presented by: Mauro Ranallo
- Country of origin: United States
- Original language: English
- No. of seasons: 1
- No. of episodes: 10

Production
- Executive producers: David Garfinkle; Jay Renfroe; Jay Bienstock; Greg Goldman
- Production locations: Bocas del Toro Archipelago, Panama
- Production companies: Buster Productions; Renegade 83

Original release
- Network: CBS
- Release: March 16 – May 18, 2022

Beyond the Edge is an American reality competition television series that premiered on CBS on March 16, 2022. Participants live in the Panamanian jungle of the Bocas del Toro Archipelago for 14 days and compete as teams to raise money for charitable organizations. A different charity has been chosen by each celebrity. Each participant can opt to leave the competition and go home at any time. At the end of the two weeks, the two stars who have earned the most money for their respective charities face off in a final challenge to determine the top earner, and winner of the competition. The series is hosted by Mauro Ranallo.

The first season concluded on May 18, 2022, with television personality and NFL defensive end Colton Underwood being crowned the winner. In September 2022, the series was canceled after one season.

== Contestants ==
Celebrity	Charity	Notability (known for)	Status	Ref.
Colton Underwood	Colton Underwood Legacy Foundation	Television personality/former NFL Defensive End	Winner; Episode 10	
Mike Singletary	Changing Our Perspective	Retired NFL Linebacker, Coach, & Pro Football Hall of Fame Inductee	Runner-up; Episode 10	
Ray Lewis	Johns Hopkins Children's Center	Retired NFL Linebacker & Pro Football Hall of Fame Inductee	Finalist; Episode 10	
Craig Morgan	Operation Finally Home	Country music singer & US Army Combat Veteran	Finalist; Episode 10	
Jodie Sweetin	Girls Inc.	Full House actress	Rang bell Episode 9	
Paulina Porizkova	ACLU Foundation	Supermodel	Rang bell Episode 8	
Eboni K. Williams	Safe Horizons	Television personality/Former Lawyer	Rang bell due to tooth infection Episode 6	
Lauren Alaina	The Next Door	Country music singer	Removed due to injury Episode 5	
Metta World Peace	The Artest University	Former NBA Small Forward	Rang bell Episode 2	

== Elimination table ==
Results
Contestant	Prize money	Episodes									
Contestant	Prize money	1	2	3	4	5	6	7	8	10	
Colton	$226,500	WIN	LOSS	WIN	WIN	WIN	LOSS	WIN	WIN	WIN	WINNER
Mike	$105,666	WIN	LOSS	LOSS	WIN	LOSS	WIN	LOSS	LOSS	WIN	RUNNER-UP
Ray	$134,166	LOSS	WIN	LOSS	LOSS	LOSS	WIN	WIN	WIN	LOSS	FINALIST
Craig	$70,000	LOSS	WIN	WIN	LOSS	WIN	LOSS	LOSS	LOSS	LOSS	FINALIST
Jodie	$59,916	WIN	LOSS	LOSS	LOSS	WIN	WIN	LOSS	LOSS	Rang Bell	
Paulina	$34,000	LOSS	LOSS	WIN	LOSS	WIN	LOSS	LOSS	Rang Bell		
Eboni	$22,000	LOSS	LOSS	LOSS	WIN	LOSS	Rang Bell				
Lauren	$42,750	WIN	WIN	WIN	WIN	LOSS	Removed				
Metta	$8,000	WIN	LOSS	Rang Bell							

- WINNER The contestant won Beyond the Edge.
- RUNNER-UP The contestant was the runner-up.
- FINALISTS The contestant made it to the finale, but did not win.
- SAFE The contestant won the challenge.
- LOSS The contestant lost the challenge.
- The contestant was medically removed from the competition.
- The contestant left the competition.

== Production ==
On December 8, 2021, it was announced that CBS had ordered the series. On February 2, 2022, it was announced that the series would premiere on March 16, 2022. The contestants and the host, Mauro Ranallo, were also announced. On September 15, 2022, CBS canceled the series after one season.

== Episodes ==
No.	Title	Original release date	Prod. code	U.S. viewers (millions)
1	"This Is Not My Comfort Zone"	March 16, 2022	101	2.58
2	"The Hardest Night of My Life"	March 23, 2022	102	2.84
3	"Quitting is Not an Option"	March 30, 2022	103	2.68
4	"Not Here To Play, Here To Win"	April 6, 2022	104	2.54
5	"We Ain't in Hollywood No More"	April 13, 2022	105	2.23
6	"It's Your Super Bowl"	April 20, 2022	106	2.21
7	"Hips Don't Lie"	April 27, 2022	107	2.41
8	"Bird Brain"	May 4, 2022	108	2.75
9	"Ask a Monkey for Help"	May 11, 2022	109	2.49
10	"One More Adventure"	May 18, 2022	110	2.47

== Reception ==
Viewership and ratings per episode of Beyond the Edge
No.	Title	Air date	Timeslot (ET)	Rating (18–49)	Viewers (millions)	DVR (18–49)	DVR viewers (millions)	Total (18–49)	Total viewers (millions)
1	"This Is Not My Comfort Zone"	March 16, 2022	Wednesday 9:00 p.m.	0.4	2.58	TBD	TBD	TBD	TBD
2	"The Hardest Night of My Life"	March 23, 2022	Wednesday 9:00 p.m.	0.4	2.84	TBD	TBD	TBD	TBD
3	"Quitting is Not an Option"	March 30, 2022	Wednesday 9:00 p.m.	0.4	2.68	TBD	TBD	TBD	TBD
4	"Not Here To Play, Here To Win"	April 6, 2022	Wednesday 9:00 p.m.	0.3	2.54	TBD	TBD	TBD	TBD
5	"We Ain't in Hollywood No More"	April 13, 2022	Wednesday 10:00 p.m.	0.3	2.23	TBD	TBD	TBD	TBD
6	"It's Your Super Bowl"	April 20, 2022	Wednesday 9:00 p.m.	0.3	2.21	TBD	TBD	TBD	TBD
7	"Hips Don't Lie"	April 27, 2022	Wednesday 9:00 p.m.	0.3	2.41	TBD	TBD	TBD	TBD
8	"Bird Brain"	May 4, 2022	Wednesday 9:00 p.m.	0.4	2.75	TBD	TBD	TBD	TBD
9	"Ask a Monkey for Help"	May 11, 2022	Wednesday 9:00 p.m.	0.3	2.49	TBD	TBD	TBD	TBD
10	"One More Adventure"	May 18, 2022	Wednesday 9:00 p.m.	0.3	2.47	TBD	TBD	TBD	TBD
