= The Final Straw (TV series) =

American game show

- Genre: Game show
- Directed by: Alex Van Wagner
- Presented by: Janelle James
- Narrated by: Josh Robert Thompson
- Composer: Vanacore Music
- Country of origin: United States
- Original language: English
- No. of seasons: 1
- No. of episodes: 10

Production
- Executive producers: Brien Meagher; Rhett Bachner; Sarah Happel Jackson; Keith Geller; Peyton Manning
- Producer: Janelle James
- Editors: Kevin Benson; Nate Belt; Darryl Fox; Anita Hadulla; Ezra Hudson; Liam Safian; Laurel Ostrander
- Running time: 42 minutes
- Production companies: Walt Disney Television Alternative; Omaha Productions; B17 Entertainment

Original release
- Network: ABC
- Release: July 10 – September 18, 2022

The Final Straw is an American game show that premiered on ABC on July 10, 2022. The series is hosted by Janelle James. On each episode, four teams of two players each compete to win up to $250,000 by removing one object at a time from a giant tower, leaving it unstable enough to topple when the opponents do the same. In March 2023, the series was canceled after one season.

== Format ==
Each episode is a self-contained competition with a three-round main game and a final round, the Mega Stack.

=== Main game ===
In each round, teams are presented with a tall stack of objects following a general theme, such as "1950s diner" or "kid's room." Flat circular platforms are sandwiched between adjacent layers, and the diameter of the stack remains constant along its entire height. A random draw determines which team has initial control.

In each of the first two rounds, two new teams alternate removing one object at a time. Only one teammate can play per turn, and once an object has been touched, the team must remove it on that turn. They may rotate or slide the object as desired and take as much time to remove it as they wish. A movable stepladder is provided so that teams can reach the upper layers of the stack. Some objects are rigged to make them more difficult to remove ("stack traps"), such as a laundry basket with a hidden rope of socks threaded through a hole in the platform on which it sits. If any part of the stack collapses, the last team to have touched it is eliminated, regardless of the time elapsed between touching/removal of the last object and the collapse.

The winning teams in the first two rounds receive $5,000 apiece and face each other in the third round, in which one object is secretly designated as a sabotage. If a team successfully removes it, the opponents must comply with a restriction on their next turn that can take one of two forms. In some episodes, they must take an object from a specific layer, determined by a random draw. In others, they are given a hindrance such as having their vision obscured by goggles or a long wig.

The winners of the third round receive a further $10,000 and advance to the Mega Stack.

=== Mega Stack ===
The stack is built from cylindrical capsules stood on end, with those in one layer taller than all others, and the diameter varies from one layer to the next. The object of this round is to remove as many of the short "cash" capsules as possible within a time limit. The clock is initially set at two minutes, but each tall "time" capsule removed will extend it by that same amount. In order for a capsule to count, it must be dropped into a vault at the edge of the stage after being removed.

The team's winnings increase as shown below.

Total cash capsules removed	Winnings
5	$10,000
9	$25,000
12	$50,000
14	$100,000
15	$250,000

Once the team reaches each winnings threshold, the clock stops briefly and they must decide whether to end the round and keep their money, or continue playing and attempt to win more. If the team either collapses the stack or runs out of time, the round ends and their winnings are reduced by one level. If they choose to end the round, they are given a chance to play on unofficially and see if they would have been able to increase their winnings.

If the round ends with the stack still upright, the host and the team deliberately knock it over.

A team can win up to $265,000 in a single episode, by winning both their preliminary round and Round 3 and then removing 15 cash capsules from the Mega Stack before time runs out.

== Production ==
On April 7, 2022, it was announced that ABC had ordered the series, which premiered on July 10, 2022. On May 23, 2022, it was announced that Janelle James would be the host and Peyton Manning would be an executive producer.

On March 24, 2023, it was reported that the series was canceled after one season.

== Episodes ==
No.	Title	Original release date	Prod. code	U.S. viewers (millions)
1	"Ready, Set, Pull!"	July 10, 2022	104	3.01
2	"Wiggle! Wiggle!"	July 17, 2022	102	2.57
3	"What Happens in Granny's Attic, Stays in Granny's Attic"	July 24, 2022	105	2.51
4	"The Wedding Crasher"	July 31, 2022	103	1.91
5	"Stack Overboard!"	August 7, 2022	101	2.09
6	"Any Pull Can Be Your Last"	August 14, 2022	108	2.07
7	"The Monster Crash"	August 21, 2022	106	1.97
8	"Be Ready to Run"	August 28, 2022	109	1.72
9	"Crescendo of Chaos"	September 11, 2022	110	1.57
10	"They All Fall Down"	September 18, 2022	107	1.45
