= Claim to Fame =

American TV series

- Genre: Reality competition
- Directed by: Brian Smith
- Presented by: Kevin Jonas; Frankie Jonas
- Country of origin: United States
- Original language: English
- No. of seasons: 3
- No. of episodes: 28

Production
- Executive producers: Chris Coelen; Eric Detwiler; Scott Teti; Paul Osborne; Brian Smith
- Running time: 42 minutes
- Production companies: Kinetic Content; Walt Disney Television Alternative

Original release
- Network: ABC
- Release: July 11, 2022 – August 28, 2024

Claim to Fame is an American reality competition series that premiered on ABC on July 11, 2022. The series is hosted by Kevin Jonas and Frankie Jonas. A second season premiered on June 26, 2023, followed by a third season on July 10, 2024.

== Gameplay ==
A number of contestants, each of whom has a famous relative, move into a secluded house together and are tasked with deducing which celebrities the other contestants are related to while also keeping their own celebrity relationship a secret. Every episode, the contestants participate in a competition, most of which incorporate cryptic clues that the contestants can use in their deductions. The winner (or the captain of the winning team in a team challenge) is usually granted immunity for the round and a bonus rebus that can be deciphered into a clue about another contestant.

At the end of most episodes, the contestants secretly vote between the two lowest-ranked performers in the competition (or the captain of the losing team, along with another losing team member of their choice) to be the round's "guesser". The guesser then chooses any other non-immune contestant and must announce which celebrity they think this other contestant is related to. If the guesser is correct, the other contestant will be eliminated; if the guesser is wrong, the guesser will be eliminated instead.

The final contestant remaining wins $100,000.

== Contestants ==
=== Season 1 ===
Season 1 contestants
Name (Note: Some contestants chose to play under aliases, not revealing their real names until their eliminations. These players are listed by their real names, with their game alias listed in parentheses.)	Age	Celebrity Relationship	Placement
Loreal Chanel Palmer ("L.C.")	33	Sister of Keke Palmer	Winner
Logan Crosby	21	Cousin of Jason Aldean	Runner-up
Pepper Martin	29	Granddaughter of Dean Martin	Third place
Lark Skov	24	Niece of Cindy Crawford	Eliminated Week 9
Adria Biles ("Louise")	23	Sister of Simone Biles	Eliminated Week 8
Amara Skye Dean	33	Granddaughter of Whoopi Goldberg	Eliminated Week 7
Jasmine English ("Kai")	N/A	Sister of Tiffany Haddish	Eliminated Week 6
Dominique Sharpton	35	Daughter of Al Sharpton	Eliminated Week 5
Brittany Favre	33	Daughter of Brett Favre	Eliminated Week 4
M Lamar ("X")	50	Identical twin sibling of Laverne Cox	Eliminated Week 3
Cubb Coleman ("Michael")	N/A	Cousin of Zendaya	Eliminated Week 2
Maxwell Norris	22	Grandson of Chuck Norris	Disqualified Week 1 (Note: Norris was caught on camera having smuggled in and using a smartphone, a violation of the show's rules. Had Norris not been disqualified, Pepper would have incorrectly guessed his relative to be Steven Spielberg.)

=== Season 2 ===
Season 2 contestants
Name	Age	Celebrity Relationship	Placement
Gabriel Ezra Cannon	34	Brother of Nick Cannon	Winner
Jerrica Monay Brooks ("Monay")	29	Daughter of J.B. Smoove	Runner-up
Chris Osmond	32	Son of Donny Osmond	Third place
Karsyn Elledge	22	Niece of Dale Earnhardt Jr.	Eliminated Week 9
Robert Lamar Stafford, Jr. ("J.R.")	33	Brother of Lil Nas X	Eliminated Week 8
Hugo Wentzel	23	Grandson of Jimmy Carter	Eliminated Week 7
Olivia Aquilina	27	Niece of Jenny McCarthy	Eliminated Week 6
Cole Cook	32	Brother of Alicia Keys	Eliminated Week 5
Shayne Murphy	28	Daughter of Eddie Murphy	Eliminated Week 4
Jada Star ("Jane")	44	Niece of Dolly Parton	Eliminated Week 3
Travis Tyson	22	Son of Neil DeGrasse Tyson	Eliminated Week 2
Carly Reeves	39	Niece of Tom Hanks	Eliminated Week 1

=== Season 3 ===
Season 3 contestants
Name	Age	Celebrity Relationship	Placement
Adam Christoferson	40	Nephew of Michael Bolton	Winner
Hud Mellencamp	30	Son of John Mellencamp	Runner-up
Mackenzie Adkins	26	Daughter of Trace Adkins	Third place
Shane Donovan Brando	36	Grandson of Marlon Brando	Eliminated Week 7
Nael Zayas ("Danny")	N/A	Nephew of Marc Anthony	Eliminated Week 6
Sigmund Jackson, Jr. ("Dedrick")	47	Nephew of Michael Jackson	Eliminated Week 5
Naomi Burns	N/A	Cousin of Molly Ringwald	Eliminated Week 4
Raphael Curtis ("Miguel")	21	Nephew of Jamie Lee Curtis	Eliminated Week 3
Gracie Lou Hyland	24	Niece of Jon Cryer	Eliminated Week 2
Jill Kurlfink	23	Niece of John Stamos	Eliminated Week 2
Bianca Roberts	47	Niece of Robin Roberts	Eliminated Week 1

== Contestant progress ==
=== Season 1 ===
Contestant	Episodes										
Contestant	1	2	3	4	5	6	7	8	9	10	
L.C.	BTM	SAFE	BTM	WON	SAFE	SAFE	SAFE	WON	WON	WON	WINNER (Note: As a result of winning the final challenge, L.C. was able to pick the final two guessers of the season, choosing Logan to guess Pepper's celebrity relative, and choosing herself to then guess Logan's celebrity relative.)
Logan	SAFE	SAFE	SAFE	SAFE	SAFE	SAFE	SAFE	GUESS	SAFE	GUESS	RUNNER-UP
Pepper	BTM	GUESS	SAFE	BTM	SAFE	SAFE	SAFE	SAFE	GUESS	THIRD	
Lark	SAFE	SAFE	GUESS	SAFE	SAFE	SAFE	WON (Note: Although Lark and Louise won the challenge, no immunity was given out and they picked themselves as the bottom two, with Lark subsequently voted to be the guesser.)	SAFE	OUT		
Louise	SAFE	SAFE	WON	SAFE	WON	WON	WON	OUT			
Amara	SAFE	SAFE	SAFE	SAFE	SAFE	GUESS	OUT				
Kai	SAFE	SAFE	SAFE	SAVE	GUESS	OUT					
Dominique	SAFE	BTM	SAFE	SAFE	OUT						
Brittany	WON	SAFE	SAFE	WRONG (Note: Brittany incorrectly guessed Kai's relative as Andra Day.)							
X	SAFE	WON	OUT								
Michael	SAFE	OUT									
Maxwell	DISQ										

==== Key ====
WON The contestant won the challenge, was safe for the week, and received a clue about one of the other contestants.
BTM The contestant was one of the bottom two from the challenge.
GUESS The contestant was the guesser, attempted to identify the contestant's celebrity relative, and were safe because they were correct.
SAVE The contestant was selected by the guesser, but because the guesser guessed incorrectly and was eliminated, this contestant was saved.
WRONG The contestant was one of the bottom two from the challenge, was voted by the other contestants to be the guesser, and was eliminated because the guess was incorrect.
OUT The contestant was eliminated by the guesser correctly identifying their celebrity relative.
DISQ The contestant was disqualified from the game.

=== Season 2 ===
Contestant	Episodes										
Contestant	1	2	3	4	5	6	7	8	9	10	
Gabriel	SAFE	GUESS	BTM	SAFE	WON	WON	WON	BTM	WON (Note: Although Gabriel won the challenge, no immunity was given out and there was no bottom two. After the results of a tie at the vote off, he picked himself as the guesser.)	WON	WINNER (Note: As a result of winning the final challenge, Gabriel was able to pick the final two guessers of the season, choosing Monay to guess Chris' celebrity relative, and choosing himself to then guess Monay's celebrity relative.)
Monay	SAFE	WON	SAFE	SAFE	SAFE	SAFE	SAFE	WON	SAFE	GUESS	RUNNER-UP
Chris	SAFE	SAFE	SAVE	WON	SAFE	BTM	SAVE	SAVE	SAFE	THIRD	
Karsyn	SAFE	SAFE	SAFE	SAFE	GUESS	SAVE	SAFE	SAFE	OUT		
J.R.	BTM	SAFE	SAFE	SAFE	BTM	SAFE	SAFE	WRONG (Note: J.R. incorrectly guessed Chris's relative as Billy Idol.)			
Hugo	GUESS	SAFE	SAFE	BTM	SAFE	SAFE	WRONG (Note: Hugo incorrectly guessed Chris's relative as Elton John.)				
Olivia	SAFE	SAFE	SAFE	SAFE	SAFE	WRONG (Note: Olivia incorrectly guessed Karsyn's relative as Jeff Gordon.)					
Cole	SAFE	SAFE	SAFE	GUESS	OUT						
Shayne	SAFE	SAFE	WON	OUT							
Jane	SAFE	BTM	WRONG (Note: Jane incorrectly guessed Chris's relative as Elvis Presley.)								
Travis	WON	OUT									
Carly	OUT										

==== Key ====
WON The contestant won the challenge, was safe for the week, and received a clue about one of the other contestants.
BTM The contestant was one of the bottom two from the challenge.
GUESS The contestant was the guesser, attempted to identify the contestant's celebrity relative, and were safe because they were correct.
SAVE The contestant was selected by the guesser, but because the guesser guessed incorrectly and was eliminated, this contestant was saved.
WRONG The contestant was one of the bottom two from the challenge, was voted by the other contestants to be the guesser, and was eliminated because the guess was incorrect.
OUT The contestant was eliminated by the guesser correctly identifying their celebrity relative.

=== Season 3 ===
Contestant	Episodes								
Contestant	1	2	3	4	5	6	7	8	
Adam	SAFE	SAVE	SAFE	GUESS	SAVE	SAFE	SAFE	WON (Note: As a result of winning the final challenge, Adam was able to pick the match-up for the first guess-off of the finale. Unlike previous seasons, the winner of that guess-off would have control over the second guess-off; Adam could not retain control if he was neither the guesser nor the target. Adam chose himself to guess Mackenzie's relative in the first guess-off, and then chose to guess Hud's relative in the second.)	WINNER
Hud	SAFE	SAFE	SAFE	BTM	WON	WON	SAFE	SAFE	RUNNER-UP
Mackenzie	SAFE	SAFE	SAFE	SAFE	SAFE	SAVE	WON (Note: Although Mackenzie won the challenge, no immunity was given out and there was no bottom two. After the results of a tie at the vote off, she picked herself as the guesser.)	THIRD	
Shane	SAVE	SAFE	BTM	WON	BTM	BTM	OUT		
Danny	SAFE	SAFE	WON	SAFE	SAFE	WRONG (Note: Danny incorrectly guessed Mackenzie's relative as Blake Shelton.)			
Dedrick	SAFE	SAFE	SAVE	SAFE	WRONG (Note: Dedrick incorrectly guessed Adam's relative as Owen Wilson.)				
Naomi	SAFE	WON	SAFE	OUT					
Miguel	BTM	SAVE	WRONG (Note: Miguel incorrectly guessed Dedrick's relative as Little Richard.)						
Gracie Lou	WON	WRONG (Note: Gracie Lou incorrectly guessed Adam's relative as Dustin Hoffman.)							
Jill	SAFE	WRONG (Note: Jill incorrectly guessed Miguel's relative as Antonio Banderas.)							
Bianca	WRONG (Note: Bianca incorrectly guessed Shane's relative as Forest Whitaker.)								

==== Key ====
WON The contestant won the challenge, was safe for the week, and received a clue about one of the other contestants.
BTM The contestant was one of the bottom two from the challenge.
GUESS The contestant was the guesser, attempted to identify the contestant's celebrity relative, and were safe because they were correct.
SAVE The contestant was selected by the guesser, but because the guesser guessed incorrectly and was eliminated, this contestant was saved.
WRONG The contestant was one of the bottom two from the challenge, was voted by the other contestants to be the guesser, and was eliminated because the guess was incorrect.
OUT The contestant was eliminated by the guesser correctly identifying their celebrity relative.

== Production ==
On March 23, 2022, it was announced that ABC had ordered the series with Kevin Jonas and Frankie Jonas as hosts. On April 7, 2022, it was announced that the series would premiere on July 7, 2022.

On January 11, 2023, the series was renewed for a second season, which premiered on June 26, 2023. A third season premiered on July 10, 2024.

== Episodes ==
=== Series overview ===
Season	Episodes	Originally released	
Season	Episodes	First released	Last released
1	10	July 11, 2022	September 6, 2022
2	10	June 26, 2023	August 28, 2023
3	8	July 10, 2024	August 28, 2024

=== Season 1 (2022) ===
No. overall	No. in season	Title	Original release date	Prod. code	U.S. viewers (millions)
1	1	"It's All Relative"	July 11, 2022	101	1.95
2	2	"Along Came a Spider"	July 18, 2022	102	1.92
3	3	"There's No X in Team"	July 25, 2022	103	1.77
4	4	"The Domfather"	August 1, 2022	104	1.76
5	5	"The Domfather Part II"	August 8, 2022	105	1.83
6	6	"Poker Face"	August 15, 2022	106	1.94
7	7	"Spot the Difference"	August 22, 2022	107	1.71
8	8	"The Puppies Are off the Leash"	August 29, 2022	108	1.64
9	9	"A Blind Dog in a Meatshed"	September 5, 2022	109	1.79
10	10	"Truth or Dare"	September 6, 2022	110	1.91

=== Season 2 (2023) ===
No. overall	No. in season	Title	Original release date	Prod. code	U.S. viewers (millions)
11	1	"Megastars and Meltdowns"	June 26, 2023	201	2.51
12	2	"Don't Get Chummy, You Dummy!"	July 3, 2023	202	2.24
13	3	"Head Shots and Thick Plots"	July 10, 2023	203	2.28
14	4	"Flirting With Disaster"	July 17, 2023	204	2.55
15	5	"It's Giving Karma"	July 24, 2023	205	1.58
16	6	"Good Cop Bad Cop"	July 31, 2023	206	1.61
17	7	"Absolutely Shredded"	August 7, 2023	207	1.79
18	8	"Defections, Connections, and Total Perplexion"	August 14, 2023	208	1.48
19	9	"Disco Balls and Clue Walls"	August 28, 2023	209	2.37
20	10	"Needle in a Haystack"	August 28, 2023	210	2.37

=== Season 3 (2024) ===
No. overall	No. in season	Title	Original release date	Prod. code	U.S. viewers (millions)
21	1	"Almost Unfamous"	July 10, 2024	301	2.10
22	2	"Double The Trouble"	July 17, 2024	302	1.96
23	3	"The Wolf In Boy's Clothing"	July 24, 2024	303	1.68
24	4	"The Rat Pack"	July 31, 2024	304	1.64
25	5	"Not Making Sense"	August 7, 2024	305	1.58
26	6	"Everything's Going Smoothie"	August 14, 2024	306	1.83
27	7	"I'm Coming Four You"	August 28, 2024	307	1.62
28	8	"Blood, Sweat and Returning Peers"	August 28, 2024	308	1.62

== Reception ==
Stephanie Morgan of Common Sense Media gave the series two stars out of five and said that the show will, "appeal only to viewers old enough to recognize the celebrities referenced," adding on, "many of the celebrities are either too niche, or too old, for younger viewers to recognize -- making the big reveals less and less satisfying." Entertainment Weekly described the show as, "a bit of a Frankenstein's monster — part Big Brother, part The Masked Singer, a pinch of The Other Two", saying that, "It's almost impossible not to play along".
