= Generation Gap (game show) =

American game show

- Genre: Game show
- Presented by: Kelly Ripa
- Narrated by: Lou Wilson
- Country of origin: United States
- Original language: English
- No. of seasons: 2
- No. of episodes: 20

Production
- Executive producers: Mark Burnett; Jimmy Kimmel; Barry Poznick; Kelly Ripa; Mark Consuelos; Albert Bianchini; Alycia Rossiter; Jonathan Kimmel
- Production location: Kaufman Astoria Studios (2023)
- Running time: 42 minutes
- Production companies: MGM Television; Kimmelot; Milojo Productions

Original release
- Network: ABC
- Release: July 7, 2022 – September 21, 2023

Generation Gap is an American game show that aired on ABC from July 7, 2022 to September 21, 2023. The series is hosted by Kelly Ripa.

== Format ==
Generation Gap is a comedy game show in which pairs of family members from different generations (typically a grandparent and grandchild) compete to win cash and prizes by answering pop culture questions. Two teams competed per episode in the first season, three in the second.

The main game is played in two rounds. Each individual member is asked a question in turn about the culture of their teammate's generation. A correct answer awards money to the team, while a miss allows any opposing member from the generation in question to buzz in and steal for half value. Questions in Round 1 are worth $500 on an initial answer and $250 on a steal; these values are doubled to $1,000/$500 in Round 2.

After two rounds, the highest-scoring team keeps their money, while the other teams receive $1,000 each. The winning team advances to the "Toddler's Choice" bonus round, in which the youngest member of their extended family is presented with a choice of two prizes: a new car or a toy intended for young children. The family receives whichever item the child selects.

== Production ==
On August 5, 2019, it was announced that ABC had ordered the series with Mark Burnett, Jimmy Kimmel and Barry Poznick as executive producers. The series is spun off from a recurring segment of Kimmel's late-night talk show Jimmy Kimmel Live!. On April 7, 2022, it was announced that the series would premiere on July 7, 2022, with Kelly Ripa as host.

On March 24, 2023, the series was renewed for a second season, which premiered on June 29, 2023.

== Episodes ==
=== Series overview ===
| Season | Episodes | Originally released | |
| Season | Episodes | First released | Last released |
|---|---|---|---|
| 1 | 9 | July 7, 2022 | September 15, 2022 |
| 2 | 11 | June 29, 2023 | September 21, 2023 |

=== Season 1 (2022) ===
| No. overall | No. in season | Title | Original release date | Prod. code | U.S. viewers (millions) |
|---|---|---|---|---|---|
| 1 | 1 | "To Infinity Stones and Beyond!" | July 7, 2022 | 103 | 3.86 |
| 2 | 2 | "All About That Booty" | July 14, 2022 | 108 | 3.44 |
| 3 | 3 | "A Game Show For Everyone Except Your Aunt Sheila" | July 28, 2022 | 109 | 3.09 |
| 4 | 4 | "Starring Garla Fibs" | August 4, 2022 | 102 | 3.34 |
| 5 | 5 | "What's Tik Tok??" | August 11, 2022 | 105 | 2.87 |
| 6 | 6 | "You're Not That Old" | August 18, 2022 | 101 | 2.85 |
| 7 | 7 | "Hewi, Dewy or Chewy?" | August 25, 2022 | 106 | 2.81 |
| 8 | 8 | "Bob Dylan Wants to Rule the World" | September 1, 2022 | 110 | 2.51 |
| 9 | 9 | "Party in the Nude" | September 15, 2022 | 107 | 2.66 |

=== Season 2 (2023) ===
| No. overall | No. in season | Title | Original release date | Prod. code | U.S. viewers (millions) |
|---|---|---|---|---|---|
| 10 | 1 | "Bernie Mac and Cheese" | June 29, 2023 | 204 | 3.22 |
| 11 | 2 | "If You Break Him, You Buy Him" | July 6, 2023 | 207 | 3.52 |
| 12 | 3 | "I Love It When It's Summertime" | July 13, 2023 | 205 | 3.30 |
| 13 | 4 | "Up Your Pop-Pop Game" | July 20, 2023 | 202 | 3.32 |
| 14 | 5 | "The Old Farts Club" | July 27, 2023 | 208 | 3.26 |
| 15 | 6 | "That's Right, He Still Has a Landline" | August 3, 2023 | 201 | 3.04 |
| 16 | 7 | "The Six Million Dollar Woman" | August 10, 2023 | 209 | 2.98 |
| 17 | 8 | "Jerry Rice Pudding" | August 17, 2023 | 206 | 3.00 |
| 18 | 9 | "Get Outta My Dreams, Get Into My Fridge" | August 24, 2023 (Note: This episode was originally scheduled as part of Season 1 on September 8, 2022, but was preempted by a special edition of 20/20 about the life of Queen Elizabeth II, who died on that day.) | 104 | 2.91 |
| 19 | 10 | "What Kid Doesn't Love Stew?" | September 14, 2023 | 203 | 2.87 |
| 20 | 11 | "Tickle Tickle" | September 21, 2023 | 210 | 2.89 |
