= Who Do You Believe? =

2022 television documentary series

- Genre: True crime Documentary
- Narrated by: Mia Bankston
- Country of origin: United States
- Original language: English
- No. of seasons: 1
- No. of episodes: 8

Production
- Executive producers: Sarah Tyekiff; Ben Crompton; Alex Weresow
- Production companies: All3Media America; Lime Pictures

Original release
- Network: ABC
- Release: May 3 – July 12, 2022

Who Do You Believe? is an American true crime documentary series which tells a story from dual perspectives. The show tells two contrasting/competing narratives of a story from the victim and criminals involved. The show aired from May 3 to July 12, 2022 on ABC. The show is narrated by Mia Bankston.

== Production ==
On March 10, 2022, it was announced that ABC had ordered the series. On March 15, 2022, it was announced that the series would premiere on May 3, 2022.

== Format ==
The show takes a new twist on the "Whodunit" approach, asking the viewer to pick who they believe is telling the truth. Putting the viewer in the seat of judge/jury on the case presented. Each hour episode follows one case told from both the side of the victim and criminals without stating who is the guilty party to start with.

== Episodes ==
No.	Title	Original release date	U.S. viewers (millions)
1	"Overwhelming Charity"	May 3, 2022	1.90
Mark Athans vs Charity Parchem
2	"Protector vs. Predator"	May 10, 2022	1.48
Kyle Johnson vs Gilbert Bell
3	"What The Sisters Saw - Part 1"	May 17, 2022	1.37
The murder of Steven Beard by his wife and her lover
4	"What The Sisters Saw - Part 2"	May 31, 2022	1.25
5	"Slayed While Sleeping"	June 7, 2022	1.57
Murder of Jon Garner in Maypearl, Texas
6	"Legacy & Lies"	June 14, 2022	1.38
Ojibwe tribe
7	"Kill Thy Neighbor"	July 5, 2022	1.42
Murder of Marc Williams in Detroit
8	"Dad's Deadly Deeds"	July 12, 2022	1.50
Murder of Linda Watson in Tucson, Arizona
