= List of 2021 American television debuts =

These are the American television shows that premiered in 2021.

First aired	Title	Channel	Source
January 1	Toon In with Me	MeTV	
January 1	Below Deck Galley Talk	Bravo	
January 3	The Watch	BBC America	
January 3	Call Me Kat	Fox	
January 3	The Great North	Fox	
January 4	90 Day Diaries	Discovery+	
January 4	90 Day Journey	Discovery+	
January 4	American Detective with Lt. Joe Kenda	Discovery+	
January 4	Amy Schumer Learns to Cook: Uncensored	Discovery+	
January 4	Auto Biography	Discovery+	
January 4	Chopped Challenge: At Home	Discovery+	
January 4	Christina: Stronger by Design	Discovery+	
January 4	Home Town: Ben's Workshop	Discovery+	
January 4	The Other Way Strikes Back!	Discovery+	
January 4	Six Degrees with Mike Rowe	Discovery+	
January 4	BattleBots: Bounty Hunters	Discovery+	
January 4	Bobby and Giada in Italy	Discovery+	
January 4	Cakealikes	Discovery+	
January 4	Gold Rush: Freddy Dodge's Mine Rescue	Discovery+	
January 4	90 Day Bares All	Discovery+	
January 4	Frozen in Time	Discovery+	
January 4	The Hustler	ABC	
January 5	Gabby's Dollhouse	Netflix	
January 5	History of Swear Words	Netflix	
January 6	Surviving Death	Netflix	
January 6	When Disaster Strikes	PBS	
January 6	Nature Gone Wild	A&E	
January 7	Mr. Mayor	NBC	
January 7	Coyote	Paramount+	
January 7	Go-Big Show	TBS	
January 7	Celebrity Wheel of Fortune	ABC	
January 8	Marvel Studios: Legends	Disney+	
January 9	Florida Man Murders	Oxygen	
January 11	Ty Breaker	HGTV	
January 11	Street Outlaws: Mega Cash Days	Discovery Channel	
January 13	Call Your Mother	ABC	
January 13	Everyone Is Doing Great	Hulu	
January 14	UFO Witness	Discovery+	
January 14	The Event	HBO Max	
January 15	Wandavision	Disney+	
January 15	Belle Collective	Oprah Winfrey Network	
January 15	Secrets of Sulphur Springs	Disney Channel	
January 15	Bling Empire	Netflix	
January 15	Mira Mira	Facebook Watch	
January 16	One Deadly Mistake	Oxygen	
January 17	Exhumed	Oxygen	
January 17	The Wild Life of Dr. Ole	Nat Geo Wild	
January 18	Dino Ranch	Disney Jr.	
January 18	The National Desk	First-run syndication (Sinclair Broadcast Group stations)	
January 18	People Puzzler	Game Show Network	
January 21	Toddlers & Tiaras: Where Are They Now	Discovery+	
January 22	Painting with John	HBO	
January 22	Pixar Popcorn	Disney+	
January 23	The Eisen Hour	Epix	
January 24	Bridge and Tunnel	Epix	
January 26	Go, Dog. Go!	Netflix	
January 27	I Survived a Crime	A&E	
January 27	Resident Alien	Syfy	
January 28	Rehab Addict Rescue	HGTV	
February 1	Nostradamus: End of Days	Discovery+	
February 2	Home Again with the Fords	HGTV	
February 2	Kid Cosmic	Netflix	
February 3	Firefly Lane	Netflix	
February 3	One Week to Sell	Discovery+	
February 4	Mary McCartney Serves It Up	Discovery+	
February 4	Fast Foodies	truTV	
February 5	The Snoopy Show	Apple TV+	
February 8	Tooned In	Nickelodeon	
February 8	Family Reunion: Love & Hip Hop Edition	VH1	
February 9	Fright Club	Discovery+	
February 10	Crime Scene: The Vanishing at the Cecil Hotel	Netflix	
February 11	Clarice	CBS	
February 12	Buried by the Bernards	Netflix	
February 14	Men in Kilts: A Roadtrip with Sam and Graham	Starz	
February 14	Searching for Italy with Stanley Tucci	CNN	
February 14	Lincoln: Divided We Stand	CNN	
February 14	Talking Evil	Discovery+	
February 15	The Crew	Netflix	
February 16	Young Rock	NBC	
February 16	Kenan	NBC	
February 19	Tell Me Your Secrets	Amazon Prime Video	
February 20	Tom and Jerry Special Shorts	HBO Max	
February 20	Power Rangers Dino Fury	Nickelodeon	
February 21	Cherries Wild	Fox	
February 21	90 Day: The Single Life	Discovery+	
February 21	90 Day: The Single Life: Pillow Talk	Discovery+	
February 23	Superman & Lois	The CW	
February 23	Assembly Required	History	
February 24	Ginny & Georgia	Netflix	
February 24	Canine Intervention	Netflix	
February 24	Design Star: Next Gen	Discovery+	
February 25	Millennials	Allblk	
March 1	Easter Basket Challenge	Food Network	
March 1	Debris	NBC	
March 1	Banfield	NewsNation	
March 3	Farmhouse Fixer	HGTV	
March 4	Kamp Koral: SpongeBob's Under Years	Paramount+	
March 4	The TS Madison Experience	WE tv	
March 4	Pacific Rim: The Black	Netflix	
March 5	City of Ghosts	Netflix	
March 9	Delilah	Oprah Winfrey Network	
March 10	Game of Talents	Fox	
March 10	Last Chance U: Basketball	Netflix	
March 11	Generation	HBO Max	
March 12	Marvel Studios: Assembled	Disney+	
March 16	The Blended Bunch	TLC	
March 17	The Pole	Syfy	
March 17	The Summoner	Syfy	
March 18	Overserved with Lisa Vanderpump	E!	
March 19	Calls	Apple TV+	
March 19	Everything But the House	HGTV	
March 19	Country Comfort	Netflix	
March 20	Drama Club	Nickelodeon	
March 25	Dota: Dragon's Blood	Netflix	
March 25	No Demo Reno	HGTV	
March 25	Baketopia	HBO Max	
March 26	The Mighty Ducks: Game Changers	Disney+	
March 26	Invincible	Amazon Prime Video	
March 29	Elliott from Earth	Cartoon Network	
March 29	Race to the Center of the Earth	National Geographic	
March 30	Pooch Perfect	ABC	
March 31	The Laundry Guy	Discovery+	
April 1	United States of Al	CBS	
April 1	Law & Order: Organized Crime	NBC	
April 1	Made for Love	HBO Max	
April 2	The Barbarian and the Troll	Nickelodeon	
April 2	Moment of Truth	IMDb TV	
April 2	My Lottery Dream Home International	HGTV	
April 4	Birdgirl	Adult Swim	
April 6	Chad	TBS	
April 7	Home Economics	ABC	
April 8	Rebel	ABC	
April 9	Doing the Most with Phoebe Robinson	Comedy Central	
April 9	Them	Amazon Prime Video	
April 11	The Nevers	HBO	
April 14	Dad Stop Embarrassing Me!	Netflix	
April 15	Wahl Street	HBO Max	
April 16	Big Shot	Disney+	
April 16	Earth Moods	Disney+	
April 18	WWE's Most Wanted Treasures	A&E	
April 19	$50K Three Ways	HGTV	
April 20	Cruel Summer	Freeform	
April 21	Married at First Sight: Unmatchables	Lifetime	
April 22	Big Trick Energy	truTV	
April 22	Generation Hustle	HBO Max	
April 22	Ellen's Next Great Designer	HBO Max	
April 22	Rutherford Falls	Peacock	
April 23	Shadow and Bone	Netflix	
April 23	Stan Lee's Superhero Kindergarten	Kartoon Channel	
April 26	Exposure	Hulu	
April 26	Inside Out	HGTV	
April 26	Life Under Renovation	HGTV	
April 29	Yasuke	Netflix	
April 29	Duff's Happy Fun Bake Time	Discovery+	
April 29	Let's Be Real	Fox	
April 29	The Big Shot with Bethenny	HBO Max	
April 30	The Mosquito Coast	Apple TV+	
May 2	Home Town Takeover	HGTV	
May 2	The Story of Late Night	CNN	
May 3	Donkey Hodie	PBS Kids	
May 4	Star Wars: The Bad Batch	Disney+	
May 4	Star Wars Vehicle Flythroughs	Disney+	
May 6	Girls5eva	Peacock	
May 6	From Cradle to Stage	Paramount+	
May 6	That Damn Michael Che	HBO Max	
May 7	Jupiter's Legacy	Netflix	
May 7	Happily Wherever	HGTV	
May 9	Ziwe	Showtime	
May 12	Clipped	Discovery+	
May 12	The Upshaws	Netflix	
May 13	Hacks	HBO Max	
May 13	Homemade Astronauts	Science Channel	
May 14	The Chicken Squad	Disney Jr.	
May 16	Fall River	Epix	
May 16	Run the World	Starz	
May 17	Don Lemon Tonight	CNN	
May 21	The Bite	Spectrum Originals	
May 21	M.O.D.O.K.	Hulu	
May 21	Solos	Amazon Prime Video	
May 21	Pause with Sam Jay	HBO	
May 23	Flatbush Misdemeanors	Showtime	
May 26	Crime Scene Kitchen	Fox	
May 26	40-Year-Old Property Virgin	HGTV	
May 28	Panic	Amazon Prime Video	
May 28	Launchpad	Disney+	
May 29	90 Day: Foody Call	Discovery+	
May 31	HouseBroken	Fox	
May 31	Small Fortune	NBC	
June 2	Court Cam Presents Under Oath	A&E	
June 2	Too Large	Discovery+	
June 4	Cellmate Secrets	Lifetime	
June 4	Sweet Tooth	Netflix	
June 5	Pushing the Line	Discovery+	
June 5	Meerkat Manor: Rise of the Dynasty	BBC America	
June 7	The BeatBuds, Let's Jam!	Nickelodeon	
June 9	Loki	Disney+	
June 9	Vanderpump Dogs	Peacock	
June 9	BET Presents: The Encore	BET	
June 10	The Cube	TBS	
June 13	Blindspotting	Starz	
June 13	Murder Nation	HLN	
June 14	The Republic of Sarah	The CW	
June 14	The Celebrity Dating Game	ABC	
June 15	Simone vs Herself	Facebook Watch	
June 16	Two Steps Home	HGTV	
June 18	Physical	Apple TV+	
June 18	Friday Night Vibes	TBS	
June 20	Kevin Can F**k Himself	AMC	
June 20	You, Me & My Ex	TLC	
June 21	Tomb Hunters	Smithsonian Channel	
June 24	When Nature Calls with Helen Mirren	ABC	
June 25	The Mysterious Benedict Society	Disney+	
June 25	The Choe Show	FX	
June 25	Sex/Life	Netflix	
July 1	Top Chef Amateurs	Bravo	
July 1	Tom and Jerry in New York	HBO Max	
July 7	Monsters at Work	Disney+	
July 8	Backyard Bar Wars	truTV	
July 9	Secret Celebrity Renovation	CBS	
July 9	Middlemost Post	Nickelodeon	
July 9	The Patrick Star Show	Nickelodeon	
July 11	Battle on the Beach	HGTV	
July 11	The White Lotus	HBO	
July 11	History of the Sitcom	CNN	
July 13	Disney's Magic Bake-Off	Disney Channel	
July 15	American Horror Stories	Hulu	
July 15	Dr. Death	Peacock	
July 16	Schmigadoon!	Apple TV+	
July 16	SurrealEstate	Syfy	
July 18	Power Book III: Raising Kanan	Starz	
July 18	100 Foot Wave	HBO	
July 18	Jerusalem: City of Faith and Fury	CNN	
July 19	On Balance with Leland Vittert	NewsNation	
July 21	Turner & Hooch	Disney+	
July 21	Behind the Attraction	Disney+	
July 22	Ultra City Smiths	AMC	
July 22	Through Our Eyes	HBO Max	
July 23	Masters of the Universe: Revelation	Netflix	
July 28	Chip 'N' Dale: Park Life	Disney+	
July 28	Turning the Tables with Robin Roberts	Disney+	
July 29	FBOY Island	HBO Max	
July 29	Jellystone!	HBO Max	
July 29	The Prince	HBO Max	
July 30	Watch the Sound with Mark Ronson	Apple TV+	
July 30	Cesar Millan: Better Human Better Dog	National Geographic	
July 30	Centaurworld	Netflix	
August 1	Johnson	Bounce TV	
August 4	Breaking Bland	HGTV	
August 4	Cooking with Paris	Netflix	
August 5	Hart to Heart	Peacock	
August 6	Mr. Corman	Apple TV+	
August 6	Spidey and His Amazing Friends	Disney Jr.	
August 6	Hit & Run	Netflix	
August 8	Family Game Fight!	NBC	
August 9	Cheap Old Houses	HGTV	
August 9	Reservation Dogs	Hulu	
August 11	Money Court	CNBC	
August 11	What If...?	Disney+	
August 12	The Hype	HBO Max	
August 12	Ex-Rated	Peacock	
August 12	The Ms. Pat Show	BET+	
August 13	AEW Rampage	TNT	
August 15	Heels	Starz	
August 18	House Calls with Dr. Phil	CBS	
August 19	Sweet Life: Los Angeles	HBO Max	
August 20	Mickey Mouse Funhouse	Disney Jr.	
August 22	Chapelwaite	Epix	
August 23	The Ultimate Surfer	ABC	
August 23	Messyness	MTV	
August 27	I Heart Arlo	Netflix	
August 31	Only Murders in the Building	Hulu	
August 31	Jason Biggs' Cash at Your Door	E!	
September 1	Raid the Fridge	Food Network	
September 1	Dug Days	Disney+	
September 2	Q-Force	Netflix	
September 3	Sharkdog	Netflix	
September 3	The D'Amelio Show	Hulu	
September 6	Days of Our Lives: Beyond Salem	Peacock	
September 6	Teenage Euthanasia	Adult Swim	
September 7	CBS Mornings	CBS	
September 8	Doogie Kameāloha, M.D.	Disney+	
September 8	Curl Appeal Xtreme	HGTV	
September 9	Frogger	Peacock	
September 9	Top Chef Family Style	Peacock	
September 9	All The Queen's Men	BET+	
September 10	The Smurfs	Nickelodeon	
September 12	American Rust	Showtime	
September 13	Little Ellen	HBO Max	
September 13	Cartoonito Shorts	HBO Max	
September 13	Mush-Mush and the Mushables	Cartoonito	
September 13	Relative Justice	First-run syndication	
September 13	You Bet Your Life with Jay Leno	First-run syndication	
September 13	Y: The Last Man	Hulu	
September 16	The Premise	Hulu	
September 16	The Harper House	Paramount+	
September 16	The Lost Symbol	Peacock	
September 16	Backyard Blowout	Peacock	
September 17	Tha God's Honest Truth with Lenard 'Charlamagne' McKelvey	Comedy Central	
September 17	Chicago Party Aunt	Netflix	
September 17	Do, Re & Mi	Amazon Prime Video	
September 17	Back to the Rafters	Amazon Prime Video	
September 17	Dan Abrams Live	NewsNation	
September 18	Lucas the Spider	Cartoonito	
September 18	Outgrown	HGTV	
September 19	Killers of the Cosmos	Science Channel	
September 19	Fiasco	Epix	
September 20	Ordinary Joe	NBC	
September 20	NCIS: Hawaiʻi	CBS	
September 20	The Big Leap	Fox	
September 21	Our Kind of People	Fox	
September 21	FBI: International	CBS	
September 22	Alter Ego	Fox	
September 22	Star Wars: Visions	Disney+	
September 23	That Girl Lay Lay	Nickelodeon	
September 24	Foundation	Apple TV+	
September 24	Wolfboy and the Everything Factory	Apple TV+	
September 27	Nick Cannon	First-run syndication	
September 28	La Brea	NBC	
September 28	Ada Twist, Scientist	Netflix	
September 29	Rhodes to the Top	TNT	
September 29	Star Wars: Galaxy of Sounds	Disney+	
September 30	The Problem with Jon Stewart	Apple TV+	
September 30	Ten Year Old Tom	HBO Max	
September 30	Yabba Dabba Dinosaurs	HBO Max	
October 1	The Ghost and Molly McGee	Disney Channel	
October 4	Alma's Way	PBS Kids	
October 5	The Nate and Jeremiah Home Project	HGTV	
October 6	CSI: Vegas	CBS	
October 7	Ghosts	CBS	
October 7	One of Us Is Lying	Peacock	
October 8	Acapulco	Apple TV+	
October 10	Diana	CNN	
October 12	Chucky	Syfy/USA Network	
October 13	Just Beyond	Disney+	
October 13	Clash of the Cover Bands	E!	
October 13	NHL on TNT	TNT	
October 14	Guilty Party	Paramount+	
October 14	America's Big Deal	USA Network	
October 14	The Kids Tonight Show	Peacock	
October 14	Puppy Place	Apple TV+	
October 15	I Know What You Did Last Summer	Amazon Prime Video	
October 15	Home Sweet Home	NBC	
October 15	Day of the Dead	Syfy	
October 19	Queens	ABC	
October 20	Winter House	Bravo	
October 20	The Bettor Half Hour	MSG Network	
October 21	The Girl in the Woods	Peacock	
October 22	Invasion	Apple TV+	
October 22	Inside Job	Netflix	
October 28	Star Trek: Prodigy	Paramount+	
October 29	Swagger	Apple TV+	
October 29	Fairfax	Amazon Prime Video	
November 1	Judy Justice	IMDb TV	
November 4	Onyx Family Dinner	YouTube Premium	
November 5	Hello, Jack! The Kindness Show	Apple TV+	
November 5	Tampa Baes	Amazon Prime Video	
November 6	Arcane	Netflix	
November 8	Call the Closer	HGTV	
November 8	Tug of Words	Game Show Network	
November 11	Paris in Love	Peacock	
November 14	Blade Runner: Black Lotus	Adult Swim	
November 14	Table Wars	HGTV	
November 14	Mayor of Kingstown	Paramount+	
November 14	The Freak Brothers	Tubi	
November 14	Yellowjackets	Showtime	
November 17	Flipping Showdown	HGTV	
November 17	Hit-Monkey	Hulu	
November 18	The Real Housewives Ultimate Girls Trip	Peacock	
November 18	The Sex Lives of College Girls	HBO Max	
November 18	Dogs in Space	Netflix	
November 19	Cowboy Bebop	Netflix	
November 19	Harriet the Spy	Apple TV+	
November 19	The Wheel of Time	Amazon Prime Video	
November 28	Harry Potter: Hogwarts Tournament of Houses	TBS/Cartoon Network	
November 29	That's My Jam	NBC	
December 2	Baking It	Peacock	
December 2	Queen of the Universe	Paramount+	
December 2	Santa Inc.	HBO Max	
December 3	Harlem	Amazon Prime Video	
December 6	Joe Pickett	Spectrum	
December 7	Abbott Elementary	ABC	
December 8	Welcome to Earth	Disney+	
December 9	And Just Like That...	HBO Max	
December 10	Saturday Morning All Star Hits!	Netflix	
December 13	American Auto	NBC	
December 14	Grand Crew	NBC	
December 15	Foodtastic	Disney+	
December 16	Finding Magic Mike	HBO Max	
December 16	MacGruber	Peacock	
December 17	With Love	Amazon Prime Video	
December 17	Chillin Island	HBO	
December 20	Tough Love with Hilary Farr	HGTV	
December 23	DreamWorks Dragons: The Nine Realms	Hulu	
December 29	The Book of Boba Fett	Disney+	

== Television films and specials ==
These television films and specials premiered or are scheduled to premiere in 2021. The premiere dates may be changed depending on a variety of factors.

First aired	Title	Channel	Source
January 1	The Rose Parade's New Year's Celebration	NBC	
January 1	The Wrong Real Estate Agent	LMN	
January 2	Taking a Shot at Love	Hallmark Channel	
January 3	Mountain Monsters: A Tribute to Trapper	Travel Channel	
January 5	Gordon Ramsay's American Road Trip	Fox	
January 5	Election Night: The Georgia Senate Runoffs - Your Voice Your Vote - An ABC News Special	ABC	
January 8	The Wrong Fiancé	LMN	
January 9	A New Year's Resolution	Hallmark Channel	
January 10	Critics' Choice Super Awards	The CW	
January 10	The SpongeBob SportsPants Countdown Special	Nickelodeon	
January 10	NFL on Nickelodeon	Nickelodeon	
January 15	The Wrong Mr. Right	LMN	
January 16	Monster Preacher	Oxygen	
January 16	Two for the Win	Hallmark Channel	
January 17	Ships in the Night: A Martha's Vineyard Mystery	Hallmark Movies & Mysteries	
January 18	North Korea: Inside the Mind of a Dictator	National Geographic	
January 20	Celebrating America	ABC, CBS, CNN, MSNBC, NBC	
January 22	The Wrong Prince Charming	LMN	
January 23	Salt-N-Pepa	Lifetime	
January 23	Let's Talk About Salt-N-Pepa	Lifetime	
January 23	Love in the Alps	Hallmark Channel	
January 28	COVID-19 Vaccine and the Black Community A Tyler Perry Special	BET	
January 30	Snowkissed	Hallmark Channel	
January 30	Wendy Williams: The Movie	Lifetime	
January 30	Wendy Williams: What a Mess!	Lifetime	
January 30	Street Gang: How We Got to Sesame Street	HBO	
February 4	No Joke: Chris Rock and Gayle King	BET	
February 5	Deadly Therapy	LMN	
February 6	Whitney Houston & Bobbi Kristina: Didn't We Almost Have It All	Lifetime	
February 6	Beverly Hills Wedding	Hallmark Channel	
February 9	Black Art: In the Absence of Light	HBO	
February 9	My Celebrity Dream Wedding	VH1	
February 10	Tuskegee Airmen: Legacy of Courage	History	
February 11	The Wrong Valentine	LMN	
February 12	Galentine's Day Nightmare	LMN	
February 13	Death Saved My Life	Lifetime	
February 13	Beyond the Headlines: Faking Death	Lifetime	
February 13	Playing Cupid	Hallmark Channel	
February 14	Valentine's Again	Hallmark Channel	
February 14	Crossword Mysteries: Terminal Descent	Hallmark Movies & Mysteries	
February 14	A Spy in the FBI	Reelz	
February 14	Aaron Hernandez: Life Inside	Reelz	
February 14	Grand Ole Opry: 95 Years of Country Music	NBC	
February 19	His Killer Fan	LMN	
February 20	The Long Island Serial Killer: A Mother's Hunt for Justice	Lifetime	
February 20	The Long Island Serial Killer: Special Report Documentary	Lifetime	
February 20	Mix Up in the Mediterranean	Hallmark Channel	
February 21	Chronicle Mysteries: Helped to Death	Hallmark Movies & Mysteries	
February 26	Brutal Bridesmaids	LMN	
February 27	Girl in the Basement	Lifetime	
February 27	Beyond the Headlines: Surviving Child Abduction and Imprisonment	Lifetime	
February 27	It Was Always You	Hallmark Channel	
February 27	Bigfoot: I Saw It!	Reelz	
February 28	Don't Waste Your Pretty	TV One	
March 5	Dangerous Medicine	LMN	
March 6	Circle of Deception	Lifetime	
March 6	Beyond The Headlines: Beauty Queens Gone Bad	Lifetime	
March 7	Oprah with Meghan and Harry: A CBS Primetime Special	CBS	
March 9	Covid Diaries NYC	HBO	
March 12	An Organized Killer	LMN	
March 13	A House on Fire	Lifetime	
March 13	Beyond The Headlines: Mental Health Myths and Misconceptions	Lifetime	
March 14	Aurora Teagarden Mysteries: How to Con a Con	Hallmark Movies & Mysteries	
March 18	Deep Blue Nightmare	LMN	
March 19	Deadly Excursion: Kidnapped From The Beach	LMN	
March 20	Chasing Waterfalls	Hallmark Channel	
March 20	Ruby	Lifetime	
March 21	Pearl in the Mist	Lifetime	
March 21	Mystery 101: Killer Timing	Hallmark Movies & Mysteries	
March 24	The Day Sports Stood Still	HBO	
March 25	People Presents: Harry & Meghan's American Dream	The CW	
March 25	Girl Talk	TLC/Oprah Winfrey Network	
March 27	Breakup Bootcamp	Hallmark Channel	
March 27	All That Glitters	Lifetime	
March 28	Hidden Jewel	Lifetime	
April 2	Hysterical	FX	
April 3	Robin Roberts Presents: Mahalia	Lifetime	
April 3	Tarnished Gold	Lifetime	
April 3	One Perfect Wedding	Hallmark Channel	
April 4	Faith Heist	Bounce TV	
April 10	As Luck Would Have It	Hallmark Channel	
April 17	Right in Front of Me	Hallmark Channel	
April 17	Lust: A Deadly Sins Saga	Lifetime	
April 18	Roll Up Your Sleeves: Presented by Walgreens	NBC	
April 24	Envy: A Deadly Sins Saga	Lifetime	
April 24	Hearts Down Under	Hallmark Channel	
April 26	Sesame Street: 50 Years of Sunny Days	ABC	
April 29	People Presents: William & Kate's Royal Anniversary	The CW	
May 8	Baby, It's Cold Inside	Hallmark Channel	
May 14	The Queen Carries On: A Gayle King Special	CBS	
May 15	Sweet Carolina	Hallmark Channel	
May 22	Iyanla: Fix My Life Farewell Special	Oprah Winfrey Network	
May 27	Friends: The Reunion	HBO Max	
May 30	Bo Burnham: Inside	Netflix	
May 31	Tulsa: The Fire and the Forgotten	PBS	
May 31	A Party Gone Wrong	Lifetime	
May 31	The Secrets She Keeps	Lifetime	
June 5	Gone Mom	Lifetime	
June 5	You Had Me at Aloha	Hallmark Channel	
June 6	Soccer Mom Madam	Lifetime	
June 12	Left for Dead: The Ashley Reeves Story	Lifetime	
June 12	The Baker's Son	Hallmark Channel	
June 13	Secrets of a Gold Digger Killer	Lifetime	
June 18	Trevor Noah Presents: Josh Johnson	Comedy Central	
June 19	Secrets of a Marine's Wife	Lifetime	
June 19	Her Pen Pal	Hallmark Channel	
June 20	Cradle Did Fall	Lifetime	
June 26	Doomsday Mom	Lifetime	
June 26	Sand Dollar Cove	Hallmark Channel	
June 27	Picture Perfect Lies	Lifetime	
June 29	TMZ Investigates: UFOs: The Pentagon Proof	Fox	
June 30	Dragging the Classics: The Brady Bunch	Paramount+	
July 5	Shark Beach With Chris Hemsworth	National Geographic	
July 10	Crashing Through the Snow	Hallmark Channel	
August 13	Spin	Disney Channel	
August 13	Descendants: The Royal Wedding	Disney Channel	
July 21	Trollhunters: Rise of the Titans	Netflix	
July 21	Olympic Dreams Featuring Jonas Brothers	NBC	
July 24	Tig Notaro: Drawn	HBO	
Spring	The Puppy Draft	Nat Geo Wild	
September 1	9/11: Inside the President's War Room	Apple TV+	
September 1	Reporting 9/11 and Why it Still Matters	Wondrium	
September 1	Women Journalists of 9/11: Their Stories	Wondrium	
September 2	CMA Summer Jam	ABC	
September 5	Front Row to History: The 9/11 Classroom	CNN	
September 5	Lost Calls of 9/11	Fox News	
September 5	Remembering 9/11: Reflections From Those Forever Changed	Start TV	
September 6	Harry & Meghan: Escaping the Palace	Lifetime	
September 6	Stories from the Stage: Changed Forever	World Channel	
September 7	Rebuilding Hope: The Children of 9/11	Discovery+	
September 7	America After 9/11	PBS	
September 8	Women of 9/11: A Special Edition of 20/20 with Robin Roberts	ABC	
September 8	E60: Comeback Season – Sports After 9/11	ESPN2	
September 8	Memory Box: Echoes Of 9/11	MSNBC	
September 8	Vice Versa Too Soon: Comedy After 9/11	Vice TV	
September 9	The 26th Street Garage: The FBI’s Untold Story	Paramount+	
September 9	9/11, 20 Years Later: Remembrance and Ramifications	CNN	
September 9	No Responders Left Behind	Discovery+	
September 9	Remembering the Game for New York	MLB Network	
September 10	Come from Away	Apple TV+	
September 10	The CIA: Race Against Time – The True Story of the CIA and 9/11	CBS	
September 10	I Can Hear You: President Bush at Ground Zero	Fox News	
September 10	9/11: The Legacy	History	
September 10	Rise and Fall: The World Trade Center	History	
September 10	Return of the Taliban: A Vice Special Report	Showtime	
September 10	Detainee 101	Showtime	
September 11	9/11/01: The First Night	MSNBC	
September 12	America's Longest War: What Went Wrong in Afghanistan	CNN	
September 15	Amanda Gorman: Brave Enough with Robin Roberts - A Special Edition of 20/20	ABC	
September 23	Kenny Rogers: All In for the Gambler	CBS	
September 26	The Tony Awards Present: Broadway's Back!	CBS	
October 1	Under Wraps	Disney Channel	
October 1	The Most Magical Story on Earth: 50 Years of Walt Disney World	ABC	
October 1	Lego Star Wars: Terrifying Tales	Disney+	
October 5	Rita Moreno: Just a Girl Who Decided to Go for It	PBS	
October 7	Mickey's Tale of Two Witches	Disney Junior	
October 8	Muppets Haunted Mansion	Disney+	
October 12	A Night in the Academy Museum	ABC	
October 17	Signed, Sealed, Delivered 13	Hallmark Drama	
October 29	Scooby-Doo, Where Are You Now!	The CW	
November 4	The Queen Family Singalong	ABC	
November 6	Highway to Heaven	Lifetime	
November 6	Attica	Showtime	
November 14	Adele One Night Only	CBS	
November 18	Psych 3: This Is Gus	Peacock	
November 25	South Park: Post Covid	Paramount+	
November 25	World Pet Games	Fox	
November 26	A Loud House Christmas	Nickelodeon	
November 26	Trolls: Holiday in Harmony	NBC	
November 27	Nash Bridges	USA Network	
November 28	The Waltons' Homecoming	The CW	
November 28	One Last Time: An Evening with Tony Bennett and Lady Gaga	CBS	
December 1	Zoey's Extraordinary Christmas	The Roku Channel	
December 1	Beebo Saves Christmas	The CW	
December 1	Kelly Clarkson Presents: When Christmas Comes Around	NBC	
December 2	Annie Live!	NBC	
December 2	Mickey and Minnie Wish Upon a Christmas	Disney Junior	
December 3	Christmas Again	Disney Channel	
December 3	Mariah's Christmas: The Magic Continues	Apple TV+	
December 3	A Christmas Dance Reunion	Lifetime	
December 6	A Very Boy Band Holiday	ABC	
December 6	Michael Bublé's Christmas in the City	NBC	
December 7	Live in Front of a Studio Audience: The Facts of Life and Diff'rent Strokes	ABC	
December 9	The Real Housewives of the North Pole	Peacock	
December 12	A Christmas Proposal	CBS	
December 12	Blending Christmas	Lifetime	
December 13	Gordon Ramsay's Road Trip: European Vacation	Fox	
December 14	Gordon Ramsay's Road Trip: Christmas Vacation	Fox	
December 16	Days of Our Lives: A Very Salem Christmas	Peacock	
December 16	South Park: Post Covid: The Return of Covid	Paramount+	
December 19	Christmas Takes Flight	CBS	
December 23	TMZ's Merry Elfin' Christmas: Bye, Bye 2021!	Fox	
December 27	2021 and Done with Snoop Dogg & Kevin Hart	Peacock	
December 31	New Year's Eve Live: Nashville's Big Bash	CBS	
December 31	Miley's New Year's Eve Party	NBC	

== Miniseries ==
First aired	Title	Channel	Source
January 4	The Courage to Run with Chip Gaines and Gabe Grunewald	Discovery+	
January 4	Elephant Hospital	Discovery+	
January 5	PBS American Portrait	PBS	
January 10	Tiger	HBO	
January 15	WandaVision	Disney+	
January 15	Framed By The Killer	Oxygen	
January 22	Pixar Popcorn	Disney+	
January 31	The Lady and the Dale	HBO	
February 5	Unseamly: The Investigation of Peter Nygard	Discovery+	
February 11	Lovers' Lane Murders	Oxygen	
February 16	The Black Church: This Is Our Story, This Is Our Song	PBS	
February 18	The Widower	NBC	
February 21	Supervillain: The Making of Tekashi 6ix9ine	Showtime	
February 21	Boiling Point	BET	
February 21	Disrupt & Dismantle	BET	
February 21	Allen v. Farrow	HBO	
March 2	Soul of a Nation	ABC	
March 19	Double Cross with Blake Griffin	truTV	
March 19	The Falcon and the Winter Soldier	Disney+	
March 21	Q Into the Storm	HBO	
March 25	For Real: The Story of Reality TV	E!	
April 1	Worn Stories	Netflix	
April 5	Hemingway	PBS	
April 7	Exterminate All the Brutes	HBO	
April 14	Michael Phelps: Medals, Memories & More	Peacock	
April 18	Mare of Easttown	HBO	
April 18	The People v. the Klan	CNN	
April 22	Secrets of the Whales	Disney+	
May 10	The Crime of the Century	HBO	
May 11	Extra Life: A Short History of Living Longer	PBS	
May 14	The Underground Railroad	Amazon Prime Video	
May 14	Halston	Netflix	
May 21	1971: The Year That Music Changed Everything	Apple TV+	
May 21	The Me You Can't See	Apple TV+	
May 25	Mike Tyson: The Knockout	ABC	
June 4	Lisey's Story	Apple TV+	
June 16	The '96 Effect	Peacock	
June 27	Golden: The Journey of USA's Elite Gymnasts	Peacock	
July 29	Dr. Death: The Undoctored Story	Peacock	
August 8	UFO	Showtime	
August 18	Nine Perfect Strangers	Hulu	
August 22	Gossip	Showtime	
August 22	NYC Epicenters 9/11→2021½	HBO	
August 25	Clickbait	Netflix	
August 29	9/11: One Day in America	National Geographic	
September 1	Turning Point: 9/11 and the War on Terror	Netflix	
September 6	Ten Steps to Disaster: Twin Towers	Smithsonian Channel	
September 12	Scenes from a Marriage	HBO	
September 19	Muhammad Ali	PBS	
September 24	Midnight Mass	Netflix	
October 1	Maid	Netflix	
October 13	Dopesick	Hulu	
October 14	Aquaman: King of Atlantis	HBO Max	
October 22	Maya and the Three	Netflix	
October 29	Colin in Black & White	Netflix	
November 12	The Shrink Next Door	Apple TV+	
November 12	Olaf Presents	Disney+	
November 16	Man in the Arena: Tom Brady	ESPN	
November 19	The Line	Apple TV+	
November 24	True Story	Netflix	
November 24	Hawkeye	Disney+	
December 16	Station Eleven	HBO Max	
December 19	1883	Paramount+	
