= 2021 in Telugu-language television =

This is a list of events taking place in 2021 relating to Telugu language television of India.

== Television programmes ==
=== Shows debuting ===
Start date	Title	Channel	Source
January 18	Rudramadevi	Star Maa	
January 31	Comedy Stars	Star Maa	
February 1	Subhodayam	Star Maa	
February 1	O Chinnadana	ETV	
February 1	Srimanthudu	ETV	
February 8	Antuleni Katha	Gemini TV	
February 8	Ala Venkatapuramlo	Gemini TV	
February 22	Chadarangam	Gemini TV	
February 22	Krishna Tulasi	Zee Telugu	
March 8	Intiki Deepam Illalu	Star Maa	
March 15	Mamathala Kovela	Gemini TV	
March 22	Janaki Kalaganaledu	Star Maa	
March 29	Mithai Kottu Chittemma	Zee Telugu	
March 29	Hamsa Geetham	Gemini TV	
April 5	Lakshmi Sowbhagyavathi	Gemini TV	
April 12	Jyothi	Gemini TV	
April 26	Paape Maa Jeevanajyothi	Star Maa	
May 10	Oohalu Gusagusalade	Zee Telugu	
May 31	Vaidehi Parinayam	Zee Telugu	
July 19	Ammaku Teliyani Koilamma	Star Maa	
July 26	Swarna Palace	Zee Telugu	
August 23	Muthyamantha Muddu	Zee Telugu	
August 23	Sundari	Gemini TV	
August 23	Kavyanjali	Gemini TV	
August 27	MasterChef India – Telugu	Gemini TV	
	Aa Okkati Adakku	Gemini TV	

=== Shows returning ===
Title	Last aired	Type of return	Channel	Status	Source
Bigg Boss S5	2020	New season	Star Maa		
Comedy Stars S2	2021	New season	Star Maa	On Air	
Drama Juniors – The Next Superstar	2019	New season	Zee Telugu	On Air	
Evaru Meelo Koteeswarulu	2017	Reboot	Gemini TV	On Air	
Maayadweepam	2014	New season	Zee Telugu		
No. 1 Yaari with Rana S3	2018	New season	Gemini TV		
Sixth Sense S4	2020	New season	Star Maa	On Air	
Start Music S4	2021	New season	Star Maa	On Air	
Super Serial Championship S3	2016	New season	Zee Telugu	On Air	
5 STAR Kitchen ITC Chef's Special S2	2020	New season	Star Maa	On Air	

=== Shows ending ===
End date	Title	Channel	First aired	source
January 8	Sam Jam	Aha	2020	
January 30	Mounaraagam	Star Maa	2018	
February 6	Bangaru Kodalu	Gemini TV	2020	
February 20	Ninne Pelladatha	Zee Telugu	2018	
March 6	Aame Katha	Star Maa	2021	
March 14	Agnisakshi	Star Maa	2020	
March 21	Aravinda Sametha	Gemini TV	2020	
March 21	Sa Re Ga Ma Pa The Next Singing ICON	Zee Telugu	2020	
March 27	Pournami	Gemini TV	2018	
April 3	Deeparadhana	Gemini TV	2020	
April 10	Girija Kalyanam	Gemini TV	2020	
April 24	Gorintaku	Star Maa	2019	
May 9	No. 1 Yaari with Rana S3	Gemini TV	2017	
May 10	Raktha Sambandham	Zee Telugu	2018	
May 14	Jyothi	Gemini TV	2021	
May 23	Dancee Plus	Star Maa	2020	
May 26	Rudramadevi	Star Maa	2021	
July 25	Comedy Stars S1	Star Maa	2021	
July 25	Start Music S3	Star Maa	2021	

=== Changes of network affiliation ===
Show	Moved from	Moved to
Evaru Meelo Koteeswarulu	Star Maa	Gemini TV

=== Continuing television programmes ===
==== 1990s ====
Programme	Date	Channel
ETV News	1995–present	ETV

==== 2000s ====
Programme	Date	Channel
Abhishekam	2008–present	ETV

==== 2010s ====
Programme	Date	Channel
Manasu Mamata	2011–present	ETV
Jabardasth	2013–present	ETV
Extra Jabardasth	2014–present	ETV
Omkaram	2014–present	Zee Telugu
Srikaram Shubhakaram	2014–present	Zee Telugu
Attarintiki Daredi	2014–present	ETV
Bathuku Jataka Bandi	2015–present	Zee Telugu
Seethamma Vakitlo Sirimalle Chettu	2015–present	ETV
Naa Peru Meenakshi	2015–present	ETV
Kumkuma Puvvu	2016–present	Star Maa
Alitho Saradaga	2016–present	ETV
Karthika Deepam	2017–present	Star Maa
Kalyana Vaibhogam	2017–present	Zee Telugu
Bandham	2018–present	Gemini TV
Akka Mogudu	2018–present	Gemini TV
Gundamma Katha	2018–present	Zee Telugu
Cash 2.0	2018–present	ETV
Mattigaajulu	2019–present	Gemini TV
Bhagyarekha	2019–present	Gemini TV
Bangaru Panjaram	2019–present	Star Maa
Vadinamma	2019–present	Star Maa
Manasichi Choodu	2019–present	Star Maa
Savitramma Gari Abbayi	2019–present	Star Maa
Rama Sakkani Seetha	2019–present	Zee Telugu
Attarintlo Akka Chellelu	2019–present	Zee Telugu
Radhamma Kuthuru	2019–present	Zee Telugu
No.1 Kodalu	2019–present	Zee Telugu
Suryakantham	2019–present	Zee Telugu

==== 2020s ====
Programme	Date	Channel
Thaali	2020–present	Gemini TV
Amrutha Varshini	2020–present	Gemini TV
Amma Kosam	2020–present	Gemini TV
Dancee Plus	2020–present	Star Maa
Raashi Phalalu	2020–present	Star Maa
Care of Anasuya	2020–present	Star Maa
Manasu Maata Vinadu	2020–present	Star Maa
Chelleli Kapuram	2020–present	Star Maa
Guppedantha Manasu	2020–present	Star Maa
Intinti Gruhalakshmi	2020–present	Star Maa
Devatha	2020–present	Star Maa
Kasthuri	2020–present	Star Maa
Neevalle Neevalle	2020–present	Star Maa
Aarogyame Mahayogam	2020–present	Zee Telugu
Inti Guttu	2020–present	Zee Telugu
Big Celebrity Challenge S3	2020–present	Zee Telugu
Hitler Gari Pellam	2020–present	Zee Telugu
Naga Bhairavi	2020–present	Zee Telugu
Trinayani	2020–present	Zee Telugu
Prema Entha Madhuram	2020–present	Zee Telugu
Star Mahila S2	2020–present	ETV
Wow S3	2020–present	ETV
Dhee 13: Kings vs Queens	2020–present	ETV
Prati Roju Pandage	2020–present	ETV
Yamaleela	2020–present	ETV
Amma	2020–present	ETV
Antuleni Katha	2021–present	Gemini TV
Chadarangam	2021–present	Gemini TV
Ala Venkatapuramlo	2021–present	Gemini TV
Mamathala Kovela	2021–present	Gemini TV
Hamsa Geetham	2021–present	Gemini TV
Lakshmi Sowbhagyavathi	2021–present	Gemini TV
Comedy Stars S2	2021–present	Star Maa
Subhodayam	2021–present	Star Maa
Start Music S4	2021–present	Star Maa
Janaki Kalaganaledu	2021–present	Star Maa
Paape Maa Jeevanajyothi	2021–present	Star Maa
Intiki Deepam Illalu	2021–present	Star Maa
Ammaku Teliyani Koilamma	2021–present	Star Maa
Sixth Sense S4	2021–present	Star Maa
5 STAR Kitchen ITC Chef's Special S2	2021–present	Star Maa
Drama Juniors – The Next Superstar	2021–present	Zee Telugu
Oohalu Gusagusalade	2021–present	Zee Telugu
Mithai Kottu Chittemma	2021–present	Zee Telugu
Krishna Tulasi	2021–present	Zee Telugu
Vaidehi Parinayam	2021–present	Zee Telugu
Muthyamantha Muddu	2021–present	Zee Telugu
O Chinnadana	2021–present	ETV
Srimanthudu	2021–present	ETV
