= List of programmes broadcast by Zee Telugu =

Zee Telugu is an Indian Telugu language general entertainment channel which is owned by Zee Entertainment Enterprises. This is the list of programmes broadcast by the channel.

== Current broadcast ==
=== Fiction ===
Premiere date	Title	Ref.
11 July 2022	Mukkupudaka	
4 November 2024	Ummadi Kutumbam	
7 April 2025	Dheerga Sumangali Bhava	
9 April 2018	Gundamma Katha	
5 August 2024	Kalavaari Kodalu Kanaka Mahalakshmi	
27 January 2025	Ennallo Vechina Hrudayam	
14 August 2023	Nindu Noorella Savaasam	
3 March 2025	Lakshmi Nivasam	
22 June 2026	Runanu Bandham	
10 June 2024	Meghasandesam	
1 January 2025	Chamanthi	
14 July 2025	Jayam	
21 August 2023	Jagadhatri	
7 July 2025	Auto Vijayashanthi	

=== Non-fiction ===
Premiere date	Title	Ref.
–	Srikaram Shubhakaram	
16 December 2013	Omkaram	
7 September 2020	Aarogyame Mahayogam	
23 August 2026	Sa Re Ga Ma Pa The Next Singing Sensation	

== Former broadcast ==
=== Drama series ===
- Agnipariksha
- Attarintlo Akka Chellelu
- America Ammayi
- Amma Naa Kodala
- Ammayi Garu
- Chiranjeevi Lakshmi Sowbhagyavathi
- Evare Nuvvu Mohini
- Gharana Mogudu
- Hitler Gari Pellam
- Inti Guttu
- Kalyanam Kamaneeyam
- Krishna Tulasi
- Lakshmi Raave Maa Intiki
- Maate Mantramu
- Maa Annayya
- Mangamma Gari Manavaralu
- Mithai Kottu Chittemma
- Muddha Mandaram
- Naga Bhairavi
- No.1 Kodalu
- Oohalu Gusagusalade
- Padamati Sandhya Ragam
- Prema
- Prema Entha Madhuram
- Radhamma Kuthuru
- Raktha Sambandham
- Seethe Ramudi Katnam
- Sriram Weds Janaki Raghuram
- Suryakantham
- Trinayani

=== Reality shows ===
- Drama Juniors (Season 1–8)
- Jayammu Nischayammu Raa with Jagapathi
- Konchem Touch Lo Unte Chepta (Season 1–4)
- Sa Re Ga Ma Pa The Next Singing ICON
- Sa Re Ga Ma Pa The Singing Superstar
- Sa Re Ga Ma Pa The Next Singing Youth Icon
- Super Serial Championship (Season 1–4)
