= Gluttony (disambiguation) =

Gluttony means over-indulgence and over-consumption of anything to the point of waste.

Gluttony or Glutton may also refer to:

== The arts ==
- The Glutton, 2023 novel by A. K. Blakemore
- Gluttony, a novel by Robin Wasserman in the Seven Deadly Sins novel series
- "Gluttony", one of three venue hubs in the Adelaide Fringe festival
- Gluttony (Fullmetal Alchemist), a fictional character

== Other uses ==
- Gluttony in Christianity, one of the seven deadly sins

== See also ==
- Glutonny, a French professional computer gamer
- Wolverine, whose name in several languages derives from "glutton"
