= 2021 in television =

2021 in television may refer to

- 2021 in American television for television-related events in the United States.
  - List of 2021 American television debuts for television debut related events in the United States.
- 2021 in Australian television for television-related events in Australia.
- 2021 in British television for television-related events in the United Kingdom.
  - 2021 in Scottish television for television-related events in Scotland.
- 2021 in Canadian television for television-related events in Canada.
- 2021 in Croatian television for television-related events in Croatia.
- 2021 in Indian television for television-related events in India.
  - 2021 in Tamil television for television-related events in Tamil.
  - 2021 in Telugu-language television for television-related events in Telugu.
- 2021 in Irish television for television-related events in the Republic of Ireland.
- 2021 in Italian television for television-related events in Italy.
- 2021 in Japanese television for television-related events in Japan.
- 2021 in Mexican television for television-related events in Mexico.
- 2021 in Philippine television for television-related events in the Philippines.
- 2021 in Portuguese television for television-related events in Portugal.
- 2021 in South Korean television for television-related events in South Korea.
- 2021 in Spanish television for television-related events in Spain.
