= Mounam Pesiyadhe (TV series) =

- Genre: Romantic; Melodrama
- Written by: Saravanan Nanjappan (dialogues)
- Screenplay by: Saravanan Nanjappan
- Directed by: Sanker
- Starring: Ashok Balakrishnan; Jovita Livingston; Iraa Agarwal; Fouziee Hidhayah
- Country of origin: India
- Original language: Tamil
- No. of seasons: 1
- No. of episodes: 303

Production
- Producer: Vadasery A. Mruganantham
- Production locations: Tamil Nadu; Malaysia
- Cinematography: Guna Rakesh
- Editor: Magathi Aji
- Camera setup: Multi-camera
- Running time: approx. 22–24 minutes per episode
- Production company: Magizh Media Pvt Ltd

Original release
- Network: Zee Tamil
- Release: 4 November 2024 – 1 November 2025

Mounam Pesiyadhe (transl. Silence spoke) is a 2024-2025 Indian Tamil-language drama series which has aired since 4 November 2024 on Zee Tamil and digitally streams on ZEE5. The show initially started with Jovita Livingston Jones and Iraa Agarwal in the female leads. But later Fouziee Hidhayah and Upasana RC replaced in the leads with Ashok Balakrishnan as the male lead. It is produced by Vadasery A. Mruganantham under the banner of Magizh Media.

The serial illustrates two love stories one set against the backdrop of Malaysia and the other in Tamil Nadu. The story is about Shiva who loses his memory in an accident. The show was ended with 303 episodes from 1 November 2025.

== Cast ==
=== Main ===
- Jovita Livingston Jones / Fouziee Hidhayah as Thulasi / Janani : Shiva's second wife. (2024-Jan.2025) / (Feb.-Nov.2025)
- Ashok Balakrishnan as Shiva: Janani's and Thulasi husband
- Iraa Agarwal as Janani: Shiva's girlfriend-turned-wife
- Vasudevan SKR as Rasu Ambalam: Visalatchi's and Meghala's husband
- Kirubha as Visalatchi Rasu Ambalam: Rasu Ambalam's first wife
- Unknown as Meghala Rasu Ambalam: Rasu Ambalam's second wife
- Unknown as Dasu: Meghala's sister and Kaveri's husband
- VJ Mohana as Kaveri: Dasu's wife
- Teenu Niroshini / Akhila as Amaravathy: Rajasekar's wife, Nila's mother
- Navindar Moorthy / Unknown as Rajasekar: Amaravathy's husband
- Jaseena as Nila
- Neelima as Bhavani
- Bharani Elangovan / V. Jayalaksmi as Padmavathi: Rasu Ambalam's sister
- Sandhyadhaiyan as Ramya: Padmavathi's daughter
- Seshathri as a Manager

=== Thulasi’s family ===
- Sathya as Sethu: Chandra and Thulasi’s husband
- Kavya Bellu as Chandra: Thulasi’s sister, Sethu’s first wife (dead)
- Manoj Kumar as Chandra and Thulasi’s father
- Sujatha Selvaraj as Chandra and Thulasi’s stepmother
- Devipriya as Sethu's sister
- Sofia as Sumathi: Thulasi’s friend
- Viji Prakash

=== Guest Appearance ===
- Nisha Ganesh as Lawer Anbukkarasi
- R. Pandiarajan as Locker Masilamani
- Ambika as Gayatri Amma

== Production ==
=== Development ===
The show was produced by Vadasery A. Mruganantham under Magizh Media. It was second collaboration with Zee Tamil after Kannathil Muthamittal serial. It was directed by Shankar.

=== Casting ===
Jovita Livingston was cast as Thulasi and it's was first collaboration with Zee Tamil. However she left the series and then later actress Fouziee replaced the role of Thulasi from February 2025. Actor Ashok, a well-experienced actor who gained fame from his movie Muruga (2007), Kadhal Solla Aasai (2014), Chithiram Pesuthadi 2 (2019), was chosen for the male lead role of Shiva. It also marks the first serial debut for Ashok Kumar as lead actor on Television.

Iraa Agarwal was cast as other special appearance in lead roles Janani, were played by the Zee Tamil successful mega serial Raja Magal (2019–2021). This series the mark comeback Iraa after two years hiatus on Television series and also it was third collaboration with Zee Tamil after Raja Magal and Super Queen. Sathya was cast as Sethu in a negative role.

In June 2025, actress Nisha Ganesh was cast as special Appearance. In end of July 2025, Veteran actor Pandiarajan was cast as Locker Masilamani in special Appearance.

=== Release ===
On 6 October 2024, the first and second Teaser was released, which gave a brief insight in Shiva and Janani and Thulasi and Sethu's background story. The first official Launch Promo on 15 October 2024, featuring Shiva and Janani, and Thulasi and Sethu's marriage happening at a temple. Shiva, happily marries his lover Janani, in the other wedding Thulasi is forced to marry Sethu. Both the couples are traveling in the same bus, which has an accident. It ends with Shiva and Thulasi coming out together to commence their new married life.

The serial was released on 4 November 2024, replacing Idhayam in its on Monday to Saturday 13:00 slot on Zee Tamil.

== Title ==
This title was taken from a 2002 Mounam Pesiyadhe movie starring Suriya, Nandha, Trisha and Neha Pendse. The English meaning of this title is Silence spoke.
