= Chasing Yesterday =

Chasing Yesterday may refer to:

- Chasing Yesterday (album), a 2015 album by Noel Gallagher's High Flying Birds
  - Chasing Yesterday Tour, a tour by Noel Gallagher's High Flying Birds
- Chasing Yesterday (books), a series of books by Robin Wasserman
- Chasing Yesterday (film), a 1935 historical drama film directed by George Nicholls Jr.
