= Kalyanam Kamaneeyam =

Kalyanam Kamaneeyam (lit. 'Marriage Blessings') may refer to:

- Kalyanam Kamaneeyam (film), a 2023 Indian Telugu-language film
- Kalyanam Kamaneeyam (TV series), an Indian Telugu-language television series
