= Robin Wasserman =

American writer of speculative fiction for young people

- Born: May 31, 1978 (age 48)
- Education: Harvard University; University of California, Los Angeles
- Occupation: Writer
- Writing career
- Notable works: Seven Deadly Sins series; Chasing Yesterday series

Robin Wasserman (born May 31, 1978) is an American novelist and essayist.

Wasserman grew up outside of Philadelphia and graduated from Harvard University and UCLA. Before she was an author she was an associate editor at a children's book publisher. Wasserman has published multiple books for children and young adults, and two critically acclaimed novels for adults. Her most recent novel, Mother Daughter Widow Wife, was a finalist for the 2021 PEN/Faulkner Award for Fiction. Her nonfiction has been published by VQR, Buzz Feed, Lit Hub, Los Angeles Review of Books, and The Atlantic. She currently lives in Los Angeles, California, and is on the faculty of the Mountainview Low-Residency MFA program at SNHU. She also writes for television.

== Works ==
=== Seven Deadly Sins series ===
The Seven Deadly Sins series from Simon & Schuster features seven morally bankrupt teenagers in a small California town. Each novel revolves around one of the sins and each character's transgressions specific to that sin. They follow the lives of Harper Grace, Beth Manning, Adam Morgan, Kane Geary, Miranda Stevens, Reed Sawyer, Katherine (Kaia) Sellers, and their French teacher, Jack Powell. Novels in the series are Lust, Envy, Pride, Wrath, Sloth, Gluttony, and Greed.

The series was made into a four-hour miniseries, which debuted on the Lifetime Movie Network on May 23 and 24, 2010.

=== Chasing Yesterday series ===
- Awakening
- Betrayal
- Truth

=== Skinned trilogy ===
- Skinned (2008)
- Crashed (September 2009)
- Wired (September 2010)

Since publication, this series title, book names, and cover images have been changed. They are the same books between the covers, however.

=== Cold Awakening trilogy ===
- Frozen
- Shattered
- Torn

=== Other books ===
- How I Survived My Most Embarrassing Moments (2004)
- Hacking Harvard (2007)
- Candy Apple
  - Callie for President (2008)
  - Life, Starring Me! (2009)
  - Wish You Were Here, Liza (2010)
- The Book of Blood and Shadow (2013)
- The Waking Dark (2014)
- Girls on Fire (2016)
- Mother Daughter Widow Wife (2020)
