= Seruppugal Jaakirathai =

2025 Tamil action comedy series

- Genre: Action comedy
- Directed by: Rajesh Soosairaj
- Starring: Singampuli; Vivek Rajgopal; Iraa Agarwal
- Music by: L. V. Muthu Ganesh
- Country of origin: India
- Original language: Tamil

Production
- Producer: Singaravelan
- Cinematography: K. Gangadaran
- Editor: Wilsy J Sasi

Original release
- Network: ZEE5
- Release: March 28, 2025

Seruppugal Jaakirathai (Beware of Sandals) is a 2025 Tamil-language action comedy web series directed by Rajesh Soosairaj and produced by Singaravelan under SS Group. The series has comedian-actor Singampuli in the lead role, with Vivek Rajgopal, Iraa Agarwal, Manohar, and a supporting ensemble. The plot revolves around the search for a diamond hidden inside a slipper. The series was released on ZEE5 March 28, 2025.

== Plot summary ==
The story revolves around Rathinam, a diamond smuggler who hides a precious gem inside his slipper during a police raid. In a panic, he swaps his footwear with a nearly identical pair belonging to Thyagarajan (Singampuli), an unsuspecting auditor. When Thyagarajan and his son Ilango misplace the slipper, a frenzied search ensues, blending slapstick comedy, unexpected twists, and high-stakes action as multiple parties vie to recover the hidden diamond.

== Cast and characters ==
- Singampuli as Thyagarajan
- Vivek Rajgopal as Rathinam
- Iraa Agarwal
- Lollu Sabha Manohar as Munusamy
- Indrajith
- Mapla Ganesh
- Usain
- Sabitha
- Uthumalai Ravi
- Palani
- Seval Ram
- Dr. Prabhakar

== Episodes ==
No.	Title	Directed by	Original release date
1	"The Birth of the Sandals"	Rajesh Soosairaj	28 March 2025
Rathnam conceals diamonds valued at 10 crores inside a pair of slippers and gives them to Thyagu, who accidentally loses them. Upon discovering their true worth, he tasks his son, Ilango, with retrieving them.
2	"The Elusive Pair"	Rajesh Soosairaj	28 March 2025
Ilango reaches Ekambaram's house and is startled to find a large crowd gathered for a funeral. As he spots the slippers, someone else picks them up and walks away.
3	"Sandals In Chaos"	Rajesh Soosairaj	28 March 2025
Ilango manages to recover the slippers, but he and his father are alarmed when they realize the diamonds are missing. Hoping to find answers, they return to Ekambaram's house, only to face another unexpected shock.
4	"Sandals and Secrets"	Rajesh Soosairaj	28 March 2025
Thyagu and Ilango grow anxious as they desperately search for the discarded slippers. Meanwhile, Rathnam arrives at Ekambaram’s house to find them himself and comes face-to-face with Thyagu.
5	"The Cursed Sandals"	Rajesh Soosairaj	28 March 2025
Thyagu deceives Rathnam, leading to him being beaten by Ekambaram’s family. The police soon arrest Rathnam, and Thyagu rejoices, believing the diamond-filled slippers will be his. However, his joy is short-lived.
6	"The Vanishing Sandals"	Rajesh Soosairaj	28 March 2025
Thyagu and Ilango make one last attempt to retrieve the diamond slippers, only to be caught by the police. However, when no diamonds are found, they are released. The mystery remains—where are the diamonds?

== Release ==
ZEE5 announced Seruppugal Jaakirathai in late 2024, releasing a first-look poster featuring Singampuli and other cast members. The platform described the series as a comedy-action project. Directed by Rajesh Soosairaj and produced by Singaravelan, the six-episode series was released on ZEE5 on March 28, 2025.

== Reception ==
Anusha Sundar of OTTPlay gave 2/5 stars and wrote "Seruppugal Jaakirathai misses the mark in delivering an engaging and coherent crime comedy. The major falter in the series is that there is a stark absence of grounded character development and an over-reliance on chaotic, exaggerated situations. Its tedious pacing and poorly executed humour don’t help the show either." A critic of Dinamalar gave 2.5/5 stars.
