= Meghana Lokesh =

Indian film and television actress

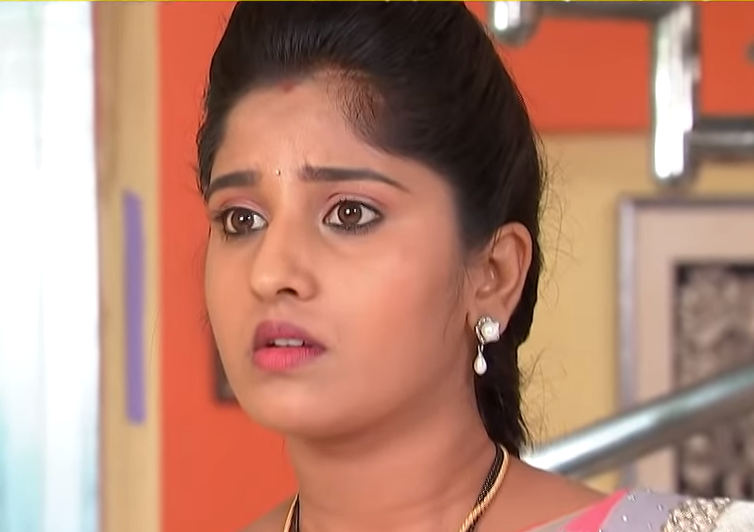
- Born: Mysore, Karnataka, India
- Occupation: Actress
- Years active: 2013 – present

Meghana Lokesh is an Indian actress. She predominantly appears in Telugu and Kannada television series, and became known for the serial Sasirekha Parinayam (2013 - 2016) as Sasi B.Tech and Devayani which premiered on the Star Maa channel.

She portrayed the double roles of Manga and Nithya and also Divya in the Zee Telugu television series Kalyana Vaibhogam from (2017-2023) the role of Tulasi in Zee Telugu's Raktha Sambandham from (2018-2021) She played dual characters as Chaitra and Alakananda in the series Kalyanam Kamaneeyam (2022-2023) in Zee Telugu.

== Early life and career ==
Meghana Lokesh was born in Mysore, Karnataka. Her father is an engineer and her mother is a Kannada lecturer. She has a brother who is also an engineer. Meghana has been associated with theatre from very young age. She started her theatre at the age of 8 and performed nearly 270 shows till her degree and Mandya Ramesh was her theatre guru. She started her Television career with supporting role in Kannada television soap opera Devi, which aired on Zee Kannada. Meghana's first lead role was in Kannada Television Series Pavitra Bandhana, where she played the role of Pavitra. Following this, She also worked in other Kannada TV Series named Purushottama, which aired on Zee Kannada.

Her big breakthrough was with the Telugu hit series Sasirekha Parinayam which screened on Star Maa from 2013 to 2016. She also acted in the feature film Idhi Ma Prema Katha opposite Anchor Ravi, which received mixed reviews.

In 2017, she acted in two message-oriented Telugu short films named Emotion and Beautiful Life. Later that year, Meghana started a new Zee Telugu series Kalyana Vaibhogam in which she is portraying the dual role of Manga and Nithya. In 2018, She featured in a film called Ameerpet 2 America. Around the time, She was signed to play a lead role in her third Telugu Soap Opera titled, Raktha Sambandham.

== Filmography ==
=== Television ===
Year	Name	Role	Language	Channel	Notes
2011	Devi	Akshatha	Kannada	Zee Kannada	Debut in Kannada
2012	Pavitra Bandhana	Pavitra	Kannada	Colors Kannada	
2013	Purushottama	Chaitra	Kannada	Zee Kannada	
2013-2016	Sasirekha Parinayam	Sasi/Sasirekha Devayani	Telugu	Star Maa	Telugu Debut Dual role
2017–2023	Kalyana Vaibhogam	(Manga and Nitya (Twins)), Divya	Telugu	Zee Telugu	Dual Role
2018–2021	Raktha Sambandham	Tulasi	Telugu	Zee Telugu	
2018	Dance Jodi Dance	Herself/Mentor	Telugu	Zee Telugu	
2022–2023	Kalyanam Kamaneeyam	Chaitra Alakananda	Telugu	Zee Telugu	Two roles
2025–2026	Chamanthi	Chamanthi	Telugu	Zee Telugu	Replaced by Pallavi Gowda

=== Film ===
Year	Title	Role	Language	Notes
2017	Idhi ma Prema Katha	Sandhya	Telugu	Telugu Debut Film
2017	Emotion	Bujji	Telugu	Short film
2017	Beautiful Life	not known	Telugu	Short film
2018	Ameerpet to America	Krishnaveni gowd	Telugu	Film
