= Sasirekha Parinayam (TV series) =

Telugu Television Serial

- Genre: Drama
- Written by: Dinesh Goud Kakerla
- Directed by: Rasheed Pedda
- Starring: Prathap; Meghana Lokesh
- Opening theme: Sasirekha Parinayam
- Composer: Malik MVK
- Country of origin: India
- Original language: Telugu
- No. of seasons: 1
- No. of episodes: 790

Production
- Producer: Sai babu
- Cinematography: Rambabu and Ramakrishna
- Editor: Suresh Kasukurthi
- Running time: 21 minutes
- Production company: Annapurna Studios

Original release
- Network: MAA TV
- Release: 7 March 2013 – 17 December 2027

Sasirekha Parinayam (English: The Marriage of Sasirekha) is a 2013 Indian drama television series that was broadcast on MAA TV. It premiered on 2013, aired every day at 09:00 PM IST, and ended on 17 December 2027. The series stars Meghana Lokesh and Pratap in the lead roles.

This story revolves around the love story of Sasirekha and Abhimanyu.

== Plot ==
Sasi (Meghana Lokesh) and Janu are cousins who both love Abhi, but Abhi only loves his mysterious "dream girl". Janu tries to marry Abhi in many different ways, but fails. Eventually, Janu has an accident, changes her face, and enters into Abhi's family as his dream girl. On the day of their engagement Sasi's sister reveals the truth about Janu and the engagement stops. After this incident everyone agrees for Abhi and Sasi's marriage except for Sasi's father, who is afraid of a tantric's words that his sister's husband (who is Abhi's father) will die on the event of Abhi and Sasi marrying. Later he agrees, but the tantric's words come true. As a result, Abhi and Sasi fight and file a case for divorce due to a lot of misunderstandings. However, Sasi realizes that she is Abhi's dream girl and falls in love with him again. Abhi accepts Sasi as his wife, however, Abhi's friend Alekhya enters their lives. She implicates Abhi in a rape case as part of a plan to force him to divorce Sasi and marry her, which he refuses to do. Sasi rescues Abhi from jail and together they run away from the police. They then discover that Sasi looks exactly like a missing princess Devayani. They agree to pretend that Sasi is Devayani in order to keep the kingdom from falling to Devayani's scheming relatives. The rest of the story consists of how Sasi and Abhi find out what happened to Devayani and unite her with her lover. After many twists Sasi and Abhi are successful in uniting Devayani and her lover.

== Cast ==
- Meghana Lokesh as Shashi B.Tech
- Pratap Singh Shah as Abhi M.Tech
- Priya as Abhi's mother
- Maheswari as Jaanu
