= America After 9/11 =

2021 television documentary film

- Genre: Documentary
- Written by: Michael Kirk; Mike Wiser
- Directed by: Michael Kirk
- Country of origin: United States
- Original language: English

Production
- Producers: Michael Kirk; Mike Wiser; Philip Bennett; Jim Gilmore; Gabrielle Schonder
- Running time: 120 minutes
- Production companies: Frontline; Kirk Documentary Group

Original release
- Network: PBS
- Release: September 7, 2021

America After 9/11 is a 2021 television documentary film about the response of the United States government towards the September 11 attacks and the consequences which eventually led to political polarization. The documentary was produced by the investigative journalism program Frontline on PBS, the film explored how xenophobia and conspiracy theories on the United States grew related response to the attacks advanced over the years since 9/11, reaching a climax in the 2021 attack on the United States Capitol. The film was directed by Michael Kirk and written by Kirk and Mike Wiser, the film first aired on PBS stations on September 7, 2021, in commemoration of the attacks' 20th anniversary.

== Interviewees ==
- Rasha Al Aqeedi, Newlines Institute for Strategy and Policy
- Peter Baker, author, Obama: The Call of History
- Rajiv Chandrasekaran, author, Little America
- Jelani Cobb, The New Yorker writer
- Bruce Hoffman, author, Inside Terrorism
- Jane Meyer, The New Yorker writer
- Colin Powell, fmr. secretary of state
- Ben Rhodes, fmr. Obama adviser
- Tom Ricks, journalist and author
- Eugene Robinson, The Washington Post
- David Sanger, author, The Inheritance
- Emma Sky, NATO adviser, Coalition Provisional Authority
- Ali Soufan, fmr. FBI agent
- Darlene Superville, Associated Press journalist
- Col. Larry Wilkerson, fmr. chief of staff
- Philip Zelikow, exec. dir. of the 9/11 Commission

== Production ==
Frontline announced on August 13, 2021, its new television documentary film America After 9/11, which was released on September 7, 2021, in commemoration of the 20th anniversary of the September 11 attacks. Director Michael Kirk stated that his documentary "offers a powerful historical record of how 9/11 ushered in an era of fear, mistrust and division in America [....] Our reporting has shown that only by tracing 9/11's complex legacy can we fully understand the path to the present — from the values compromised, to the trust eroded, to the wars abroad, to the insurrection at home."

== Critical response ==
James Poniewozik of The New York Times called the film one of "two of the [September 11 attacks'] anniversary's most striking documentaries" (alongside Spike Lee's film NYC Epicenters 9/11→2021½). Poniewozik stated that "the filmmaker Michael Kirk lays it out economically: The attacks set off a chain of action and changes — military quagmires, suspicion and racism at home, the loss of trust in institutions — that demagogues used to undermine democracy, and that fulfilled Osama bin Laden’s goal of dividing and weakening America. [...] The dark side won, 'America After 9/11' argues."
