= Mrs. Mukhyamantri =

2019 Indian Marathi language TV series

- Genre: Family drama
- Written by: Tejas Ghadge
- Directed by: Harish Shirke
- Starring: See below
- Theme music composer: AV Prafullachandra
- Opening theme: "Mi Miravnar, Saglyanchi Jiravnar"
- Composer: AV Prafullachandra
- Country of origin: India
- Original language: Marathi
- No. of episodes: 295

Production
- Producers: Shweta Shinde; Sanjay Khambe
- Production locations: Satara, Maharashtra
- Camera setup: Multi-camera
- Running time: 22 minutes
- Production company: Vajra Production

Original release
- Network: Zee Marathi
- Release: 24 June 2019 – 12 September 2020

Mrs. Mukhyamantri (transl. Mrs. Chief Minister) is an Indian Marathi language television series which aired on Zee Marathi. It starred Amruta Dhongade and Tejas Barve in lead roles. It premiered from 24 June 2019 by replacing Lagira Zala Ji. It is produced by Shweta Shinde under the banner of Vajra Production.

== Plot ==
It is a story revolves around a young small-town girl Suman from Satara, who becomes Mrs. Mukhyamantri due to the twists of fate. Suman's mother dies when she was very young. She is a hardworking girl who is trying to make a living for herself. She lives with her drunkard and steals money father Tatya. Samarsingh Mantri-Patil is a pilot by profession. Anuradha Mantri-Patil has always dreamt to become Mrs. Mukhyamantri and wants her husband Shersingh Mantri-Patil to becomes Mukhyamantri.

=== Special episode ===
- 22 September 2019 (2 hours) (Samar-Sumi's Marriage)
- 15 December 2019 (1 hour)

== Cast ==
=== Main ===
- Amruta Dhongade as Suman Suresh More / Suman Samarsingh Mantri-Patil (Sumi)
- Tejas Barve as Samarsingh Shersingh Mantri-Patil

=== Recurring ===
- Rajashri Sawant-Wad / Vandana Sardesai-Waknis as Anuradha Shersingh Mantri-Patil
- Sunil Shetye as Shersingh Mantri-Patil
- Gajanan Kumbhar / Shrikant KT as Suresh More
- Hemangi Kavi as Ragini Shinde (Dhanashri)
- Raju Bawdekar as Narsu
- Bhakti Zanzane as Shalini
- Rohit Chavan as Baban
- Veena Katti as Bayo
- Rukmini Sutar as Bhama
- Rahul Belapurkar as Laxman
- Savita Gaikwad as Geeta

== Reception ==
=== Ratings ===
Week	Year	BARC Viewership		Ref.
Week	Year	TRP	Rank	Ref.
Week 31	2019	3.5	5	
Week 32	2019	3.3	5	
Week 33	2019	3.5	5	
Week 34	2019	3.5	5	
Week 35	2019	3.7	5	
Week 36	2019	3.5	5	
Week 37	2019	3.4	4	
Week 38	2019	3.6	4	
Week 39	2019	4.5	4	
Week 41	2019	3.4	4	
Week 42	2019	3.5	4	
Week 44	2019	3.7	5	
Week 45	2019	3.6	4	
Week 46	2019	3.2	5	
Week 49	2019	3.2	5	
Week 9	2020	2.7	5	
Week 10	2020	2.7	4	
Week 11	2020	2.5	5	
Week 13	2020	1.9	4	
Week 28	2020	2.3	4	
Week 29	2020	1.9	5	

== Awards ==
Zee Marathi Utsav Natyancha Awards 2019
Category	Recipients	Role
Best Actress	Amruta Dhongade	Suman
Best Siblings	Rohit Chavan-Amruta Dhongade	Baban-Sumi

== Adaptations ==
Language	Title	Original release	Network(s)	Last aired	Notes
Marathi	Mrs. Mukhyamantri मिसेस मुख्यमंत्री	24 June 2019	Zee Marathi	12 September 2020	Original
Telugu	Mithai Kottu Chittemma మిఠాయి కొట్టు చిట్టెమ్మ	29 March 2021	Zee Telugu	19 August 2023	Remake
