= Kaiyethum Doorath (TV series) =

Malayalam-language television series

- Genre: Drama
- Directed by: Mohan Kupleri
- Starring: See below
- Country of origin: India
- Original language: Malayalam
- No. of episodes: 823

Production
- Camera setup: Multi-camera
- Running time: 22 minutes

Original release
- Network: Zee Keralam
- Release: 30 November 2020 – 10 June 2023

Kaiyethum Doorath (transl. Within the hand's reach) is an Indian Malayalam language television series aired on Zee Keralam. The series is an official remake of Zee Telugu series Raktha Sambandham.

== Synopsis ==
The story is about the loving relationship of two siblings, Krishna Prasad and Krishna Priya, sharing a strong bond with them, Priya adores Krishna Prasad and is even willing to sacrifice her own happiness for her brother's needs.

Prasad's wife, Durga and Priya become pregnant around the same time.During baby shower ceremony Mangalam (Prasad and Priya's paternal aunt) insults Durga, so she vows that she will die if she doesn't give birth to a male child. Sulochana a.k.a. Sulu (Durga's distinct relative) sows seeds of bitterness in Durga's heart which widens the gap between Durga and Priya. Unfortunately, Durga gets a girl, Tulasi. Priya gives birth to a boy, Adhitya. Later they are exchanged by their parents to save Durga's life. Only Priya and her husband know the truth of the children's birth.

After child birth with the proudness of having given an heir to the family, Durga starts to drift away from the rest of the family members. Sulu incites Durga that Priya is trying to take away her son which becomes the main reason for Durga's hatred towards Priya. Soon Mangalam join hands with Durga only to destroy the family using Durga as a tool. The sisterly bond between Durga and Priya fades away and hatred and jealousy comes in as the children grow up. Durga gets fed up with the growing bond between Aadhi and Tulasi and demands partition of the property or she would leave the house with Aadhi.

Durga and Priya both buy houses in the same area. Durga also ends the relation between Aadhi and Thulasi. Aadhi grows up to have a strong hatred towards Thulasi. He often insults Thulasi.

Durga always boasts about her son and insults Priya and Tulasi. Tulasi always enjoys fighting with Durga which annoys Durga. Mangalam decides to harm Thulasi so that they could be safe from her. Thulasi meets with an accident but is saved by Aadhi. To pay the operation fees Priya seeks help from Durga who in turns asks for the house Priya lives in. Durga is seen to have a soft corner for Priya even though she hates Thulasi.Then Tulasi and Adhitya fall in love with each other but Durga on knowing the fact makes Aadhi promise her that she will not make Thulasi her daughter-in law. the rest of the story is about how Durga tries to separate the loving couple and how Tulasi overcomes the hard conditions and wins Durga's acceptance for their wedding.

== Cast ==
=== Main ===
- Krishnapriya K Nair as Thulasi/ Krishnathulasi Aadithyan
  - A naughty, brave girl; Adi's cousin and his love interest who turns to be his wife
  - Jaysheelan and Priya's adoptive daughter, Prasad and Durga's Biological daughter
- Sajesh Nambiar as Adi a.k.a. Aadithyan
  - a dull and calm boy; Thulasi's cousin and love interest who turns to be her husband
  - Prasad and Durga's adoptive son, Jayasheelan and Priya's biological son

=== Recurring ===
- Vaishnavi Saikumar as Kanaka Durga a.k.a. Durga Prasad
  - Foster mother of Adi and biological mother of Thulasi
  - Foster mother of Thulasi and biological mother of Adi
- Sharran Puthumana as ACP Krishna Prasad
  - Durga's husband and Priya's elder brother, the foster father of Adi and biological father of Thulasi
- Anand Thrissur as Jayasheelan / Jayan
  - Priya's husband, he is the Foster father of Thulasi and Biological father of Aadhi
- Kanya Bharathi as Mangala
  - Durga's aunt and Athira's grandmother
- Sreedevi Unni as Mandakini a.k.a. Veluthamma
- Anoop Soorya as Adi's Friend
- Maneesha Jayasingh / Ardra Das as Athira
  - Mangalam's Grand Daughter, Praseetha's Daughter whom Durga sees as her Daughter-In-Law
- Gowri Krishnan as Gayathri Devi
  - PWD Minister of Kerala
- Anandhu as Sreehari / Hari
  - Gayathri Devi's Younger Brother and he wishes to marry Thulasi
- Manju Vineesh as Sulu
  - Durga's faithful house servant
- Geetha Nair as Rugminiyamma
  - Priya and Prasad's mother and Grandmother of Thulasi and Adi, mother in law of Durga and Jayan
- J. Padmanabhan Thampi as Shanthan
  - Mangalam's husband
- Indulekha as Dr.Indu
- Kiran Raj as Chandra Das
- Vishnu Prasad as Rajeev(main villain)
  - Husband of LEKHA IPS

=== Guest roles ===
- Lakshmi Gopalaswamy
- Priyanka Anoop
- Lekshmi Prasad
- Richard Jose
- Swathy Nithyanand

== Adaptations ==
Language	Title	Original release	Network	Last aired	Notes
Telugu	Raktha Sambandham రక్త సంబంధం	9 April 2018	Zee Telugu	10 May 2021	Original
Tamil	Raja Magal ராஜாமகள்	28 October 2019	Zee Tamil	27 November 2021	Remake
Malayalam	Kaiyethum Doorath കൈയെത്തും ദൂരത്ത്	30 November 2020	Zee Keralam	10 June 2023	Remake
