= Skinned (novel) =

2008 novel by Robin Wasserman

- Author: Robin Wasserman
- Language: English
- Series: Cold Awakening trilogy
- Genre: Sci-fi
- Published: 2008
- Pages: 368
- ISBN: 1416936343
- Followed by: Crashed, Wired

Skinned is a young adult sci-fi by Robin Wasserman. First published in 2008, the novel has since been renamed Frozen and is the first book in the Cold Awakening trilogy. After her organic body dies in a car accident, Lia's mind is scanned and downloaded into a mechanical body with no resemblance to the original. Grappling with the concepts of personal identity and what it means to be human, Lia must decide if she wants to return to her old life or assimilate into her new one.

== Plot ==
The book is set in a dystopian future where much of the environment has been ruined, the government is run by corporations, and only the privileged have enough credits to live a life of luxury in sprawling mansions in the country. Everyone else is forced to live in ruined cities, where they face starvation, or CorpCities, where they are all but slaves. Lia Kahn is one of the privileged, until an unexpected car accident leaves her fatally injured. Her family decides to enlist the services of BioMax, a company that takes scans of Lia's brain and downloads her mind into a mechanical body, known to the general public as "skinners," despite preferring to be called "mechs." Lia must deal with the trials of a new type of existence, including the revulsion society feels for "skinners," the prospect of immortality, and the balance of her new life with her former one.

=== Characters ===
Lia Kahn - Once a beautiful, popular, smart 17-year-old, Lia had her brain downloaded into an artificial body after a terrible car accident left her near death. Her new body does not need food or air, is virtually indestructible, and will not die. Lia's sister, Zoie, believes that the real Lia is dead, and their father is overheard saying that he wishes he had not had Lia's brain downloaded after the accident. Lia's friends and boyfriend from before the accident refuse to accept the new, mechanical Lia. Auden is the only who treats Lia like a person, and the two grow close because of this, until Auden blames Lia for the accident that leaves him severely injured.

Auden - A social outcast, Auden is not a "designer baby" like the rest of his peers, because his mother didn't believe in "playing God." Due to a family history of mental illness, he is not eligible for download after jumping off a waterfall in an attempt to 'save' Lia (he forgot that she is nearly indestructible) leaves him gravely injured.

Zoie Kahn - Lia's sister, Zoie thinks that "Skinner" Lia is an impostor. She attempts to preserve her sister's former life from the new "impostor" by becoming the leader of Lia's group of friends, and even dating Lia's boyfriend, Walker.

Jude - A "mech" painted silver, with clear skin showing circuitry on his arm, Jude thinks Lia needs to let go of her "org" (organic) life and fully embrace the mechanical lifestyle. He was one of the first mech experiments and is the ringleader of the group that lives at Quinn's.

Ani - One of Jude's mechs, Ani has romantic feelings for Quinn.

Quinn - One of Jude's mechs, Quinn has near unlimited credit and allows the other mechs to live at her sprawling mansion. She was born without legs and became a candidate for mechanical body experimentation after her parents were killed in a car accident. Quinn loves the freedom that mech life provides her and does not believe in monogamy.

Walker - Lia's ex-boyfriend, Walker cheats on her with Zoie. He cannot accept the "new" Lia.

== Major themes ==
=== Humanity ===
One of the main themes of the novel revolves around the question, "what does it mean to be human?" This is evident in many places throughout the novel, from Lia's internal struggle with accepting her new, mechanical life, to Auden's mother choosing to not "play God" before her son's birth. As reviewer Thea James says:

...there are a few interesting questions that the novel quietly raises (unconsciously, perhaps): humans in Lia’s rich and privileged world have test-tube babies, with genomes hand selected with traits they desire (boy/girl, hair/eye/skin color, intelligence, beauty, a family physical trait, emotional empathy, etc). There’s a degree of uncertainty with some of the non-physical traits, but children are made to order in this dystopian vision of the future. Too, at one point Lia argues with her track coach about those on the team with robotic body parts who are not discriminated against as Lia is. So, the question (that is never asked but implied) isn’t just ‘what is human?’ but rather ‘what is the defining limit of human?’

== Publication history ==
- 2008, USA, Simon Pulse 1416936343, 9 September 2008, hardback

== Reception ==
Fellow YA fiction author Scott Westerfeld said Wasserman's debut novel was "A spell-binding story about loss, rebirth, and finding out who we really are inside...intense and moving."
