= Iraa Agarwal =

Indian actress

- Born: May 19, 2000 (age 25)
- Occupations: Model; Actress; Boxer
- Years active: 2017–present

Iraa Agarwal (born 19 May 2000) is an Indian beauty pageant titleholder, actress, and boxer who works in Tamil-language television shows and films.

== Career ==
In 2015, she won the Miss South India beauty pageant. In 2017, she made her film debut with the thriller film Dhayam. in 2018, she starred in Kattu Paya Sir Intha Kaali. In 2019, she replaced Shivani Narayanan in the television show Kadaikutty Singam. Later that same year, she portrayed one of the leads in the soap opera Rajamagal on Zee Tamil. Outside of acting, she won a gold medal for boxing at the United International Games 2019.

== Filmography ==
- All films are in Tamil, unless otherwise noted.

Year	Film	Role	Notes
2017	Dhayam	Ashwin Augustin's Wife	
2018	Kattu Paya Sir Intha Kaali	Amudha Paul	

== Television ==
Year	Title	Role	Channel	Notes
2017	Ganga	Mahima	Sun TV	
2018	Kanmani	Vanathi Raja Durai	Sun TV	Replaced by Janani Pradeep
2019	Kadai Kutty Singam	Meenakshi	Star Vijay	Replaced Shivani Narayanan
2019–2021	Raja Magal	Thulasi	Zee Tamil	
2019–2020	Dance Jodi Dance Season 3	Contestant	Zee Tamil	
2021	Sembaruthi	Amman	Zee Tamil	Special Appearance
2022	Namma Madurai Sisters	Kavya	Colors Tamil	
2022	Super Queen	Contestant	Zee Tamil	
2024	Mounam Pesiyadhe	Janani	Zee Tamil	
2025	Seruppugal Jaakirathai		ZEE5	
