= Intiki Deepam Illalu =

- Genre: Drama
- Written by: Padmini Nadella
- Directed by: Ravi nagpuri
- Creative director: Nandhana Nadella
- Presented by: Sri shirdi sai productions
- Starring: Dhanya Deepika; Shiva Kumar; Rajashri Nair; Priyanka Chowdhary; Neema Singh; Manoj
- Opening theme: Intiki Deepam Illalu
- Country of origin: India
- Original language: Telugu
- No. of episodes: 778

Production
- Producers: Yepuru Srinadh; Padmini Nadella
- Cinematography: Suresh
- Editor: Harikrishna Bandla
- Camera setup: Multi camera
- Running time: 22 minutes
- Production company: Sri Shiridi Sai Productions

Original release
- Network: Star Maa
- Release: 8 March 2021 – 9 September 2023

Related
- Saath Nibhaana Saathiya

Intiki Deepam Illalu (transl. Wife Is a Light to the House) is an Indian Telugu-language drama television series that aired on Star Maa starring Dhanya Deepika, Shiva Kumar, Rajashri Nair, Priyanka Chowdhary and Manoj. It is a remake of the Hindi television series Saath Nibhaana Saathiya. In 2021, Neema Singh replaced Priyanka Chowdhary as Raashi. The series is produced by Yepuru Srinadh and Padmin Nadella.

== Plot ==
Harinarayana murders his brother Srinavasa Raju and his wife Lakshmi while they are journeying with their one-year-old daughter Krishna. Jayaram and Damayanthi find them with wounds and a dying Lakshmi persuades them to take Krishna in and gives them her jewellery in return. They leave the village with Krishna and their children Raashi and Surya as Harinarayana harms them. Twenty years later, Krishna gets mistreated by Damayanthi and Raashi. Innocent, soft-spoken and kind hearted Krishna had always yearned for love. Maheshwari chooses Krishna for her son Manohar and get them married while Manohar's cousin Harsha and Raashi marry. The story revolves around her struggles to win the heart of her husband Manohar, who does not love her with her strict mother-in-law Maheshwari turning mentor for her, amidst which Raashi hatches various plans to defame Krishna and separate her from the family. Varshini, Mano's sister, is set to marry Uday, the brother of Mano's former love interest Hema. Varshini acts as if she is pregnant with Uday's progeny to gain Maheshwari's support for her to marry Uday. On the wedding day, Uday abducts Krishna when the latter discovers that he is acting as if he loves Varshini and is marrying her to take revenge on Mano for marrying Krishna despite being in a relationship with Hema.

Raashi saves Krishna and they expose Uday, who is banished. Therefore, Varshini is forced to marry Surya. Though after some tribulations; Surya-Varshini and Krishna-Manohar fall in love. Varshini is protected from Uday's evil conspiracies and she accepts Krishna as her sister-in-law and mother-figure. Uday is revealed to be Krishna's cousin and Harinarayana's son. After Raashi has a miscarriage, she pins the blame on Krishna. Due to conflicts, the house is divided into two with a line drawn separating it. Maheshwari, Krishna, Manohar and the latter's father live on one side of the house while Harsha, his parents Leelavathi and Jagadish and Raasi live on other side. Maheshwari moves out of the house with her family after discovering that Varshini was modelling in Uday's agency and was having an affair with him a few days after her marriage out of disgrace. Leelavathi and Jagadish realize their mistake and tries to unite with Maheshwari and buys a house in their neighbourhood. Manohar gets drunk under Raasi's influence and forces himself upon Krishna, who gets pregnant due to it. She has an internal conflict with Manohar which is hidden from an excited Maheshwari. When Maheshwari discovers the truth, she leaves the house, meets with an accident and is presumed to be dead. However, she is alive and is unhappy, so she does not return home.

Manohar blames Krishna for Maheshwari's death and they decide to get divorced. Harsha gets romantically involved with a businesswoman Harika who joins their office and troubles Raasi. Krishna and Manohar are asked to stay with each other for six months together by court for reconsidering their divorce decision. Maheshwari starts living with a couple after saving one of their lives. The trio start a catering business and Varshini-Surya approach them as they have a curry point. Everyone discovers that Maheshwari is alive. She returns home. Krishna miscarries but Manohar and Maheshwari hold her responsible. As Harsha and Harika's affair is exposed to the family, Jagadish suffers from a stroke; Leelavathi ousts Harsha and Raasi leaves the house to stay with her parents. Krishna and Manohar reconcile. Damayanthi torments Varshini and despises her, blaming her and her family for Raashi's miseries. Raashi and Damayanthi, in a bid to avenge, implicate Jagadish and Mano, prompting their arrest. Maheshwari falls ill and is hospitalized while their properties are seized; Leelavathi and Krishna work to afford the expenses, rejecting Harsha's assistance. Damayanthi persuades Surya to divorce Varshini but he is against it. Rocky, Harika's former boyfriend, makes his entry and despises her for deceit. He frees Jagadish and Mano from prison while everyone presumes that Harika had them incarcerated. Harinarayana discovers that Krishna is her niece, after whom the assets are named; he conspires to acquire the properties and joins hands with Damayanthi but secretly abducts Surya to avenge Uday's earlier encounter with him.

Surya, whose face is disfigured, is found dead and it is falsely stated that he met with an accident while a recovered Maheshwari is away on a pilgrimage and the family is dejected. Damayanthi assumes that Surya was fleeing from money lenders, from whom he borrowed money to assist Krishna and her in-laws in their worst time. She blames them for his accident and banishes Varshini from her residence. Harinarayana reveals himself as her uncle to Krishna and takes her with them to her ancestral bungalow. Krishna, despite Damayanthi and Raashi's cruel antics, takes them into her home; Harika tells Harsha to act like if he has reformed and expose Raashi's misdeeds and she has seemingly reformed into a good person and loves Harsha truly. Harsha feigns reconciliation and Raashi is grateful to Krishna; Harika arrives at Krishna's home and proclaims her pregnancy. She is rejected but Krishna houses her and tells her to leave the house after giving the family their heir / heiress. Raashi is against the idea and begins to hate Krishna and Harika. Raashi and Krishna conceive. Krishna reminds Harsha that he wronged Raashi and exposes Harika's betrayal to Rocky, which causes him to give Raashi a second chance and avoid Harika. Harinarayana, Uday and Damayanthi continue to plot against Krishna and Manohar. Harika gives birth to a daughter and the family rejoices. A spiritual guru anticipates that Krishna's baby would be Lakshmi's reincarnation and will have a long life but they have danger in store for them.

Krishna and Raashi too deliver daughters; Raashi's baby dies which prompts Krishna to switch the babies with the doctor's help secretly. As Damayanthi and Raashi superstitiously presume that Krishna's baby died due to her fault in her horoscope, they restrain her from approaching her own daughter (whom they believe to be Raashi's daughter). Harika wins everyone's hearts but repents for her actions and deserts her daughter, leaving her in Krishna and Mano's foster care. Krishna's daughter, who is presumed to be Raashi's daughter, is named as Siri while Harika's daughter is christened Vennela. Damayanthi and Harinarayana devises an accident to Krishna, rendering her infertile. Mano and Krishna attempt to adopt Vennela but Raashi, Damayanthi, Harinarayana and Uday intercept as they believe that the adoption would cause the assets to be transferred to her. The guru tells the family that they are destined to know the truth and advises Krishna not to adopt Vennela as she will be harmed, implying that Damayanthi and others would kill her.

== Cast ==
=== Main ===
- Dhanya Deepika as Krishnapriya a.k.a. Krishna: Srinivasa Raju and Lakshmi's daughter; Jayaram and Damayanthi's foster daughter; Surya and Raashi's foster sister; Uday and Hema's cousin; Mano's wife; Siri's mother; Vennela's foster mother (2021–2023)
- Shiva Kumar as Manohar a.k.a. Mano: Maheshwari Devi and Prasad's son; Varshini's brother; Harsha's cousin; Hema's former lover; Krishna's husband; Siri's father; Vennela's foster father (2021–2023)
- Rajshri Nair (2021-2023) / Shanoor Sana (2023) as Maheshwari Devi: Prasad's wife; Manohar and Varshini's mother; Siri's paternal grandmother

=== Recurring ===
- Priyanka Chowdhary / Neema Singh as Raashi: Jayaram and Damayanthi's daughter; Surya's sister; Krishna's foster sister; Harsha's wife; Siri's foster mother (2021) / (2021–2023)
- Manu Manoj as Harsha: Jagadish and Leelavathi's son; Mano and Varshini's cousin; Raashi's husband; Siri's foster father; Vennela's father (2021–2023)
- Niharika as Harika: Harsha's former affair-interest and colleague; Raashi's rival; Vennela's mother (2022–2023)
- Anusha Sasurala as Hema: Harinarayana's daughter; Uday's sister; Krishna's cousin; Varshini's former best friend; Mano's former love interest and obsessive lover (2021-2022)
- Nikitha Chowdary as Varshini: Prasad and Maheshwari's daughter; Mano's sister; Harsha's cousin; Hema's best friend; Uday's former love interest; Surya's widow (2021–2023)
- Vikram Shanmukha as Uday: Hari's son; Hema's brother; Krishna's cousin; Varshini's former love interest (2021–2023)
- Sravani as Damayanthi: Jayaram's wife; Raasi and Surya's mother; Krishna's foster mother (2021–2023)
- Yarlagadda Sailaja as Ratnaprabha: Jagadish and Prasad's mother; Mano, Harsha and Varshini's grandmother (2021–2022)
- Sreedhar as Jayaram: Damayanthi's husband; Raasi and Surya's father; Krishna's foster father (2021–2022)
- Durga Devi as Leelavathi: Jagadish's wife; Harsha's mother; Raasi's mother-in-law; Vennela's paternal grandmother (2021–2023)
- Nawaz Shan as Harinarayana: Srinavasa Raju's brother; Uday and Hema's father (2021–2023)
- Girish as Jagadish: Leelavathi's husband; Harsha's father; Raasi's father-in-law; Ratnaprabha's elder son; Prasad's elder brother; Mano and Varshini's uncle; Vennela's paternal grandfather (2021–2023)
- Uma Devi as Harinarayana's mother-in-law (2021)
- Nagireddy Surya as Surya: Jayaram and Damayanthi's son; Raashi's elder brother; Krishna's foster brother; Varshini's husband (2021–2023)
- Unknown as Prasad: Maheshwari's husband; Mano and Varshini's father; Krishna's father-in-law; Ratnaprabha's younger son; Jagadish's younger brother; Harsha's uncle; Siri's paternal grandfather (2021–2022)

=== Cameo ===
- Bharani Shankar as Srinivasa Raju: Lakshmi's husband; Krishna's biological father; Hari's elder brother (2021)
- Pravaleeka as Lakshmi: Srinivasa Raju's wife; Krishna's biological mother (2021)

== Adaptations ==
Language	Title	Original release	Network(s)	Last aired	Notes
Hindi	Saath Nibhaana Saathiya साथ निभाना साथिया	3 May 2010	StarPlus	23 July 2017	Original
Marathi	Pudhcha Paaul पुढचं पाऊल	2 May 2011	Star Pravah	30 June 2017	Remake
Tamil	Deivam Thandha Veedu தெய்வம் தந்த வீடு	15 July 2013	Star Vijay	26 May 2017	Remake
Malayalam	Chandanamazha ചന്ദനമഴ	3 February 2014	Asianet	9 December 2017	Remake
Bengali	Bodhuboron বধুবরন	19 August 2013	Star Jalsha	29 January 2017	Remake
Telugu	Intiki Deepam Illalu ఇంటికి దీపం ఇల్లాలు	8 March 2021	Star Maa	9 September 2023	Remake
