= 5 STAR Kitchen ITC Chef's Special =

2020 Indian television show

- Genre: Cooking show
- Created by: ITC Foods
- Presented by: Dheeraj Juneja
- Country of origin: India
- Original language: Hindi
- No. of seasons: 2
- No. of episodes: 12

Original release
- Network: Disney Star
- Release: 22 May 2020 – present

5 STAR Kitchen ITC Chef's Special is a 2020 Indian cooking show that debuted on 23 May 2020 on Disney Star Channels and Disney+ Hotstar. The show was created by ITC Foods in collaboration with Star network. Hosted by Dheeraj Juneja, it was primarily based upon Indian cuisine.

== Overview ==
5 Star Kitchen ITC Chef's Special is a Hindi-language show that aired every Saturday and Sunday on Star TV. It ran for about six weekends and the first episode was broadcast on 23 May 2020. In each episode, the chefs of ITC Hotels share recipes featuring Indian cuisine. The programme is hosted by Dheeraj Juneja, who had previously presented cricket-based projects and was a host in Zee TV's Lagao Boli – Sabse Kam Sabse Anokhi with Anita Hassanandani and Paritosh Tripathi.
