= The Glutton =

2023 novel by A. K. Blakemore

- Author: A. K. Blakemore
- Language: English
- Genre: Historical fiction
- Publication date: 2023
- Publication place: United Kingdom

The Glutton is a 2023 novel by British author A. K. Blakemore, adapting the story of French eater and showman Tarrare. The book follows a fictionalised protagonist named Tarare throughout the Ancien Regime and French Revolution.

== Plot ==
A dishevelled Tarare is admitted to a Versailles hospital in 1798. He is diagnosed with severe malnutrition and tuberculosis, but refuses to eat and instead claims his condition is the result of a golden fork he ate and then failed to pass. A young sister named Perpetué is given the night watch over his room, where he is chained to the bed on suspicion of killing and eating a child at another hospital years earlier. He befriends her, and offers to retell his life story.

Tarare is born in 1772 to a pair of teenaged peasants near Lyon. His father is mortally wounded in a drunken brawl as his mother is giving birth and, when asked for a name for the child, he only responds with "Tarare" before expiring. Tarare's mother takes up prostitution and midwifery before falling in love with a smuggler named Nollet, who stores black market table salt under their floorboards. At 16, Tarare falls in love with a boy named Hervé, however Hervé betrays them to a rival gang that robs Tarare and his mother of their salt and gold. Nollet assaults Tarare in retribution, leaving him for dead in the forest. Tarare survives, eventually waking up in a field far away with a deep, preternatural hunger.

Tarare is rescued by a passing showman and pimp named Lozeau. Lozeau and his posse stay as entertainers at a wedding, where the locals discuss growing political repression and make calls for a revolution. Tarare is overwhelmed by hunger and attacks the storeroom, eating enough for five men in a single hour. They are chased out in the morning, however Tarare's antics earn the affections of the young harlot Pierette and Lozeau's beautiful brother Antoine. Tarare's hunger worsens as he travels, gorging himself on scraps. Lozeau is inspired by Tarare eating cork, and debuts him as "The Bottomless Man" in Saint-Flour. Tarare is an instant hit after eating a dead rat thrown by Antoine as an audience plant, beginning a tour of his eating act on the gang's route to Paris. Tarare notices his metabolism begin to shift in response to his diet, but is otherwise content with his existence.

France tips closer to revolution as the posse move towards Paris. Pierette seduces Tarare at a noble's manor destroyed by looters and radicals, but rejects him after he ejaculates prematurely to thoughts of Antoine. Antoine gets drunk at a festival in Bercy and attempts to rob a carriage with a flintlock. One of their companions is killed by crossfire with the driver, and the shots summon a local militia. Tarare flees after they force him to swallow their meagre loot for safekeeping, including a golden fork.

Tarare scrapes out a living in Paris throughout the Revolution, eventually signing to fight in the War of the First Coalition out of desperation for more food. He is sent to a military hospital after resorting to petty theft and sexual favours to access his comrades' rations. His care is divided between the kind and spiritual Citizen-Doctor Depuis, who attempts to manage Tarare with a conventional diet of boiled eggs and other basic but plentiful meals, and the atheistic Doctor Courville, who goads Tarare into eating live animals to satisfy his own sadistic curiosity. Beauharnais approves of using Tarare as a military courier after Courville claims he can swallow a message and pass it behind enemy lines, though Napoleon and the others remain unconvinced.

Tarare is sent into Prussian-controlled Alsace-Lorraine with instructions to reach a prisoner of war. He successfully disguises himself as a German, but outs himself as a Catholic by crossing himself before a meal. He is arrested and taken to one General Zögli, who has him beaten into confessing his ploy and producing the container. The message is revealed to be a childish ethnic insult written by Beauharnais as a test rather than the important intelligence Tarare was told he was carrying. Zögli relents and has Tarare released to the French lines after a mock execution.

Tarare is rendered listless and apathetic by his humiliation, allowing Courville to continue his experiments unimpeded. He turns to cannibalism at night, feeding off amputations and drained blood. Depuis is disturbed one day by panic over a missing child, suspected to have been eaten by Tarare. He catches up to Tarare as he flees for Paris with a bundle of the child's bones, though Tarare claims the child was already dead when he found her and knocks Depuis out to escape.

Years later, Depuis receives word of Tarare admitted to a Christian hospital. He arrives in the morning only for Perpetué to inform him that the patient died overnight. Depuis considers Tarare's life before coldly ordering an autopsy of his corpse.

== Writing and analysis ==
The historical figure of Tarrare was a polyphage known to have performed as a show eater somewhere near Lyon, serving in the First Republic army before being admitted to hospice care. He was chased out of the hospital after a young child went missing. Blakemore depicts much of his appetite truthfully, though his personal life is dramatised or invented for narrative effect. She decided on Tarrare as the subject of a novel in order to depict the pain of his perpetual hunger. The novel stylistically draws on French fairy tale traditions and their depictions of ravenous, man-eating giants, while also referencing historical depictions of Tarrare as figure of both preternatural revulsion and comical fascination. Tarare's eating scenes are treated with exceptional detail in order to emphasise the public spectacle at the narrative's core. Tarare's experiences are used to explore uncanniness, sexuality and political power in Revolutionary France.

== Reception ==
The Glutton received positive reviews, with praise for its style and tone, drawing heavy commentary on its historical context and close comparisons to Blakemore's earlier work as a poet. It was shortlisted for the Dylan Thomas Prize and the Encore Award.
