= Raja Magal =

2019 TV series

- Genre: Soap opera
- Written by: Dialogues; P. Maarimuthu
- Directed by: J Vijayabaskar (Episode 1-123); K.Shiva (Episode 124-538)
- Starring: Iraa Agarwal; Vimal Venkatesan
- Theme music composer: Sekar Sai Bharath
- Country of origin: India
- Original language: Tamil
- No. of seasons: 1
- No. of episodes: 538

Production
- Producer: R. K. Manohar
- Cinematography: Aanad
- Editor: P.Arunkumar
- Camera setup: Multi-camera
- Running time: approx. 20-25 minutes
- Production company: Rajammal Creations

Original release
- Network: Zee Tamil
- Release: 28 October 2019 – 27 November 2021

Rajamagal (transl. King's daughter) is an Indian Tamil-language drama airing on Zee Tamil. It premiered on 28 October 2019. The show stars Iraa Agarwal with Vimal.

== Synopsis ==
Sivagami, a polite lady has an elder brother named Rajarajan. He has married an arrogant lady Bairavi. Initially, both brother and sister lived in the same house. Sivagami and Bairavi were pregnant at the same time. Bairavi wishes for a baby boy, but she gives birth to a baby girl. While Sivagami gives birth to a baby boy. To fulfill Bairavi's wish, Sivagami swapped the babies. Then Bairavi accuses Sivagami because of her aunt Kanchana's plan for trying to amass the family property. So she always tortures Sivagami. When their children became adults, Sivagami's daughter, Thulasi, and Bhairavi's son, Vishwa.

Bairavi verbally abuses Sivagami's daughter, not knowing that she is her biological child. The final injustice is when Bhairavi in a fit of anger on Sivagami, throws a bowl on her and hits Thulasi. The fight occurs when Bairavi says to take a part of the property for her son which prompts Sivagami to do the same. This incident made Sivagami and her husband Parthiban leave the house.

After 20 years, Bairavi and Sivagami's children were grown up as Thulasi and Vishwa. Thulasi – a naughty, fun, and brave girl, who grew up with Sivagami and Parthiban. Where Vishwa – a calm and innocent boy, grew up with Bairavi and Rajarajan. Thulasi and Vishwa continually tease each other in the form of games. Vishwa has already confirmed to his mother that he will never fall for Thulasi. But day by day it fails. Also, Bairavi and Thulasi meet in any place, Thulasi will start to tease her in a comical way. Without knowing that Thulasi was her biological daughter, Bairavi gets anger and both will quarrel every day. Also if any function days come, Bairavi calls Sivagami and family to the function and she will insult them. So that Sivagami feels sad and Thulasi will argue with Bairavi. When Vishwa and Thulasi are teenagers, Bairavi does not allow Vishwa to speak with Thulasi, and also she strictly warns Thulasi.

But Thulasi ignores Bairavi and she meets Vishwa on the streets. Also, Vishwa falls in love with Thulasi. Meanwhile, Rajarajan and Sivagami already planned when Vishwa and Thulasi in childhood that in future they will marry each other. But, Bairavi refuses Thulasi and she can't imagine her as a daughter-in-law so that she called Kanchana's granddaughter Kanaka Lakshmi, to her home and she fixed Lakshmi as Vishwa's fiancée. But Rajarajan not allows this marriage, so that Bairavi blackmails Rajarajan and got the promise from him that Vishwa and Thulasi should not marry. On the other hand, Bairavi calls to meet an astrologer to check the horoscope details of Vishwa and Thulasi, but already Bairavi requested the astrologer to lie, has if Vishwa marries Thulasi, Sivagami will die. Rajarajan heard this from an astrologer and he decided to keep a distance from Sivagami, Parthiban, and Thulasi. When Rajarajan scolds Thulasi, Sivagami feels heartbroken.

Then Thulasi found that the astrologer lied to Rajarajan and she warns Bairavi, but Bairavi becomes tense and plots to defeat her. Bairavi planned to theft Thulasi's mobile from one thief, likewise, he stole the mobile. Then the thief called Thulasi to come and collect the mobile in a car shed, meanwhile Bairavi planned and told Kanaka Lakshmi to be with the thief. Kanaka Lakshmi called Rajarajan and made a drama that she was kidnapped by someone. As Thulasi came to the car shed, Rajarajan also came after Thulasi to that place. The thief saw Thulasi and he kept the mobile and escaped. Thulasi found her mobile, that time Kanaka Lakshmi shouted for help. When Rajarajan heard and went to see. When he enters, he is shocked that Thulasi is there and he rescues Kanaka, then Kanaka Lakshmi lies that Thulasi only kidnapped her. Rajarajan misunderstood Thulasi and he visits Sivagami's house with Thulasi and he scolded her. When Rajarajan slaps Thulasi, Sivagami is appalled and she reveled the truth of Thulasi that she is the biological daughter of him and also explains the flashback of swapping babies. Rajarajan feels discomfort and he cares about Thulasi.

== Cast ==
=== Main ===
- Iraa Agarwal (2019 – 2021) as Thulasi: Vishwa wife; Sivagami and Parthiban's foster daughter; Bairavi and Rajarajan's biological daughter
- Riyas (2019 – 2021) as Vishwa (Replaced by Vimal)
  - Vimal Venkatesan (2021) as Vishwa: Thulasi's husband; Bairavi and Rajarajan's foster son; Sivagami and Parthiban's biological son
- Sathya Sai Krishnan (2020 – 2021) as Kanakalakshmi: Vishwa's ex-fiancee, who comes with an idea to marry Vishwa (Main Antagonist)

=== Recurring ===
- Vanaja as Bairavi: Foster mother of Vishwa, and biological mother of Thulasi (2019 – 2021)
- Gayathri Priya as Sivagami: Foster mother of Thulasi and biological mother of Vishwa (2019 – 2021)
- Yuvanraj Nethrun (2020 – 2021) as Parthiban: Sivagami's husband, he was Foster father of Thulasi and Biological father of Vishwa
  - Parthan Siva as Parthiban (2019 – 2020)
- Bharath Kalyan as Rajarajan: Bairavi's husband and Sivagami's brother, the foster father of Vishwa and biological father of Thulasi (2019 – 2021)
- VJ Meenakshi (2019 and 2020 – 2021) as Sathyavathi: Bairavi's faithful house servant
- Raghavendran as Mayakannan: Thulasi and Vishwa's helper (2020 – 2021)
- Nisha as Rudhra: Kanaka Lakshmi's elder sister, Parallel Antagonist (2021)
- Srithik Sriram as Sriram: Vishwa's best friend (2020 – 2021)
- Balambika (2020 – 2021) as Kanchana: Thulasi and Vishwa's parental grandmother and Kanaka Lakshmi's grandmother. She plans to separate Rajarajan and Parthiban's family
  - Shanthi Williams as Kanchana (2019 – 2020) (replaced by Balambika)

=== Special appearance ===
- Vishnu as Prabhu: Thulasi's boyfriend (Episode 197–199)
- Ayesha as Sathya: who helps Vishwa and Thulasi to unite (Episode 197–199)
- Rekha Nair as Renuka Devi: The district Minister, whose daughter was rescued by Thulasi

== Production ==
=== Casting ===
- Actress and boxer Iraa Agarwal was selected to play a lead female role as Thulasi with newcomer Riyas, was selected to play a male role as Vishwa. While Metti Oli series fame Vanaja, Gayathri Priya, Barath Kalyan and Yuvanraj Nethran play supporting roles.

=== COVID-19 outbreak ===
- Due to COVID-19 Pandemic situation, Rajamagal and other serials have stopped from 28 March 2020. Months later, TV serial shooting was permitted on India. So from 27 July 2020, Zee Tamil serials resumed with fresh episodes.

== Special and Crossover episodes ==
Raja Magal cast and crew amalgamated the episodes called Triveni Sangamam with Endrendrum Punnagai and Rettai Roja from 26 December 2020 to 9 January 2021. This was the first time in Tamil television shows for three series to be combined.

== Adaptations ==
Language	Title	Original release	Network	Last aired	Notes
Telugu	Raktha Sambandham రక్త సంబంధం	9 April 2018	Zee Telugu	10 May 2021	Original
Tamil	Raja Magal ராஜாமகள்	28 October 2019	Zee Tamil	27 November 2021	Remake
Malayalam	Kaiyethum Doorath കൈയെത്തും ദൂരത്ത്	30 November 2020	Zee Keralam	10 June 2023	Remake
