= A. K. Blakemore =

English author, poet, and translator (born 1991)

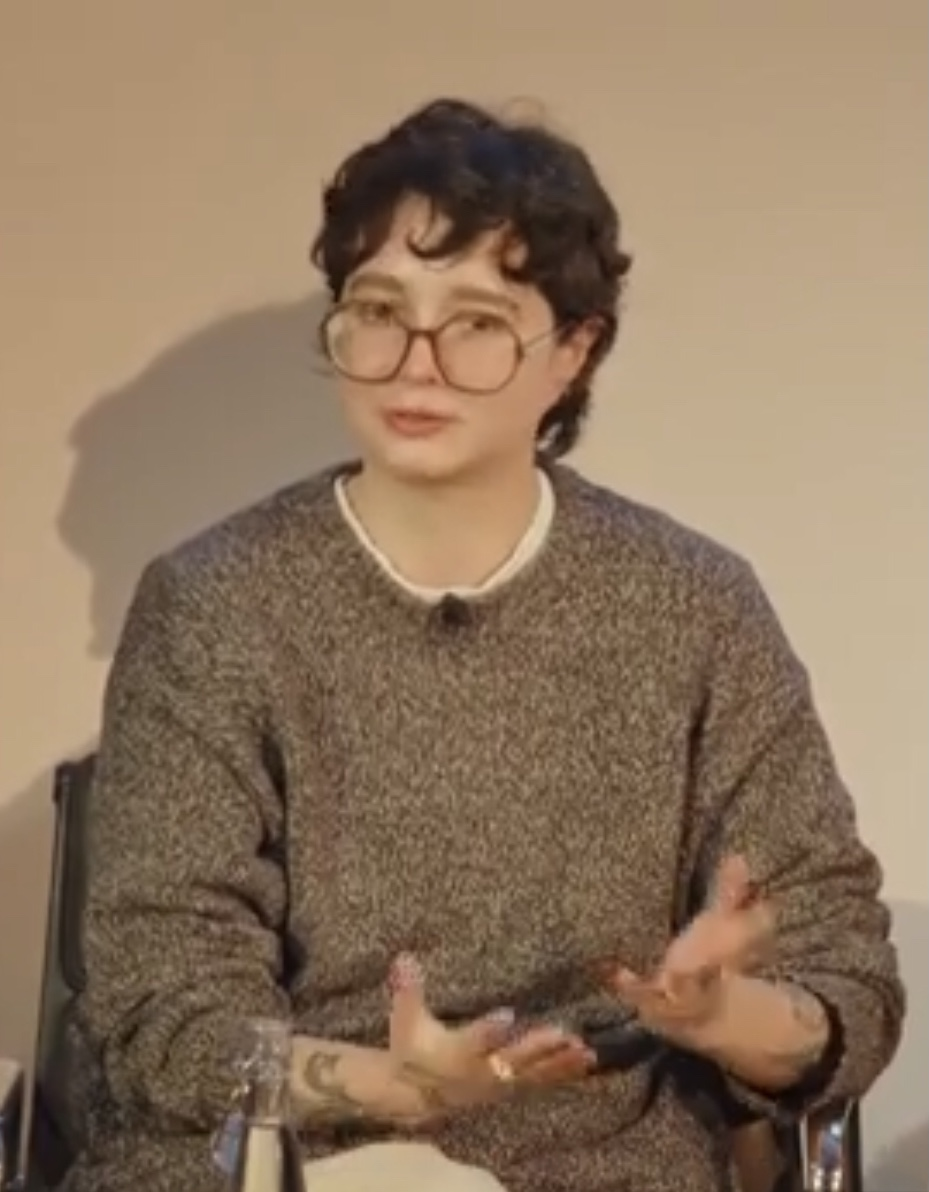
- Blakemore at the British Library in 2023
- Born: Amy Katrina Blakemore; 11 May 1991 (age 35); London, England
- Education: University of Oxford
- Occupation: Poet • translator • novelist
- Writing career
- Language: English
- Period: 2007–present

Amy Katrina Blakemore (born 11 May 1991), known professionally as A. K. Blakemore, is an English author, poet, and translator.

== Early life and education ==
Amy Katrina Blakemore was born on 11 May 1991 in London, England. She was raised in South London, where she attended comprehensive school in Deptford. She then went on to study language and literature at the University of Oxford, and worked part-time as a model.

== Career ==
=== Poetry ===
Blakemore has cited Sam Riviere, Mary Ruefle, and Emily Dickinson as influences. She was a winner of the Foyle Young Poets of the Year Award for her poems "Peckham Rye Lane" and "You Envied the Stars Their Height" in 2007 and 2008, respectively. In 2009 her work was anthologized in Bloodaxe Books's Voice Recognition: 21 Poets for the 21st Century. Her first single author publication, the pamphlet Amy's Intro, was published in 2012 as part of Nasty Little Press's Intro series.

Humbert Summer, Blakemore's first full-length poetry collection, was published by Eyewear Publishing in 2015. That same year she won the Melita Hume Prize for Poetry. In 2016 she collaborated with If a Leaf Falls Press to publish the pamphlet pro ana, which was only distributed in a run of twenty-four copies. Her sophomore poetry collection Fondue was subsequently published by Offord Road Books in 2018 and awarded a Ledbury Forte Prize for the Best Second Collection at the 2019 Ledbury Poetry Festival.

Further original poetry has been featured in various literary publications including The White Review, Hotel, and Ambit, as well as anthologized in Stop Sharpening Your Knives No. 4 (Egg Box, 2011) and The Best of British Poetry (Salt Publishing, 2015). In collaboration with Dave Haysom, Blakemore translated My Tenantless Body, a collection of poetry by Sichuanese poet Yu Yoyo. The collection was published by the Poetry Translation Centre as part of their World Poets Series in 2019.

=== Novels ===
Blakemore's first novel, The Manningtree Witches (Granta Books, 2021), is a fictional account of the Essex witch trials. It received generally positive reviews, and was the 2021 winner of the Desmond Elliott Prize.

The Glutton (Granta Books, 2023) fictionalizes the true story of Tarrare, a French showman with polyphagia who served as a military courier in the French Revolution. It was shortlisted for the Dylan Thomas Prize and the Encore Award.

Doom Painting (Granta Books, 2026) reimagines stories from the Peasant's Revolt of 1381. The book drew upon historical sources including the People of 1381 database.

== Adaptations ==
In July 2022, The Forge Entertainment optioned the rights to adapt The Manningtree Witches for television.

The Manningtree Witches was adapted for stage by Ava Pickett and the production company Frantic Assembly. Directed by Natasha Rickman, the play ran in February - March 2026 at the Mercury Theatre, Colchester.

== Bibliography ==
=== Poetry ===
- Amy's Intro (Nasty Little Press, 2012)
- Humbert Summer (Eyewear Publishing, 2015)
- pro ana (If a Leaf Falls Press, 2016)
- Fondue (Offord Road Books, 2018)

=== Work as translator ===
- My Tenantless Body (Poetry Translation Centre, 2019), written by Yu Yoyo

=== Novels ===
- The Manningtree Witches (Granta Books, 2021)
- The Glutton (Granta Books, 2023)
- Doom Painting (Granta Books, 2026)
