= Bangaru Kodalu =

- Genre: Drama family
- Written by: Bhavishya; Dialogues; Narasimha Murthy Nallam
- Screenplay by: K Rahul Varma
- Directed by: K Rahul Varma
- Starring: Amar Sasanka; Mounika Devi; Divya Deepika; Priyanka
- Theme music composer: Meenakshi Bhujangh
- Opening theme: "Konaseema"; Mangli (vocals); Sagar Narayana (lyrics)
- Country of origin: India
- Original language: Telugu
- No. of seasons: 1
- No. of episodes: 211

Production
- Producers: Vasu Inturi; Kolli Praveen chandra
- Cinematography: Sai venkat
- Editor: Ravi vadla
- Camera setup: Multi-camera
- Running time: 20-22 minutes
- Production company: Inturi Innovations

Original release
- Network: Gemini TV
- Release: 24 February 2020 – 6 February 2021

Bangaru Kodalu is an Indian Telugu-language Soap opera aired on Gemini TV from 24 February 2020 to 6 February 2021 every Monday to Saturday for 211 episodes. The show starred Amar Sasanka, Mounika Devi, Priyanka and Divya Deepika in leading roles.

== Cast ==
- Amar Sasanka as Vikas
- Mounika Devi as Divya, Neelambari's best friend
- Priyanka as Neelambari aka Neelu (Vikas's Sister in law)
- Divya Deepika as Srija (Vikas's Sister in law)
- Jaya kumar as Abhishek
- Raja Babu (Vikas's Grand father)
- Indu Anand as Neelambari (Vikas's Grand mother)
- Vijay as Arjun (Vikas's Father)
- Vijaya as Sulochana (Vikas's mother)
- Sravya sruthi as Chandana (Vikas's Sister)
- Ranjitha as Rukmini (Neelu's mother)
- Surya as Neelu's father
- Srihari as Akash, Neelu's love interest
- Roopa Reddy (Akash's mother)
- Shridhar (Akash's father)
- Suryateja as Rudra
- Kolli Praveen Chandra as Deva, police Inspector

=== Former cast ===
- Smrithi as Srija's mother (replaced by Jahnavi Chowdary)
- Jahnavi Chowdary as Srija's mother (replaced by Vanitha Reddy)
