= Disrupt & Dismantle =

2021 television documentary series

- Genre: Documentary
- Presented by: Soledad O'Brien
- Starring: Karina Rayeford
- Country of origin: United States
- Original language: English
- No. of series: 1
- No. of episodes: 6

Production
- Executive producers: Soledad O'Brien; Jo Honig; Randy Ferrell
- Production location: Tidewater Gardens
- Production company: Soledad O'Brien Productions

Original release
- Network: BET
- Release: February 21 – March 24, 2021

Disrupt & Dismantle is an American six-part television documentary series which premiered on February 21, 2021 on BET. The series is hosted by Soledad O'Brien.

== Episodes ==
No.	Title	Original release date	U.S. viewers (millions)
1	"Shingle Mountain"	February 21, 2021	0.17
2	"Preventing Death in the Delta"	February 28, 2021	0.17
3	"The Most Incarcerated Zip Code in America"	March 3, 2021	0.25
4	"Non-Unanimous Juries in Louisiana"	March 10, 2021	0.22
5	"Displacement in the Mermaid City"	March 17, 2021	0.28
6	"The Cost of Black Motherhood in Mississippi"	March 24, 2021	N/A
