= Nature Gone Wild =

2021 American television series

- Genre: Reality
- Presented by: Greg Aiello
- Country of origin: United States
- Original language: English

Original release
- Network: A&E
- Release: January 6 – February 3, 2021

Nature Gone Wild is an American reality television series. The series premiered on A&E on January 6, 2021. In the series, explorer Greg Aiello takes a closer look at extreme sides of nature, such as natural disasters and animal encounters.
