= Chasing Yesterday (books) =

Series of books by Robin Wasserman

Chasing Yesterday is a series of books written by Robin Wasserman. The series follows a girl after she wakes up in the middle of rubble, with no memory of her past. The series includes Awakening, Betrayal, and Truth.
