= Tampa Baes =

American reality television series

- Genre: Reality television
- Starring: Cuppie Bragg; Marissa Gialousis; Haley Grable; Mack McKenzie; Summer Mitchell; Olivia Mullins; Brianna Murphy; Ali Myers; Shiva Pishdad; Melanie Posner; Nelly Ramirez; Jordan Whitley
- Country of origin: United States
- Original language: English
- No. of seasons: 1
- No. of episodes: 8

Production
- Executive producers: Jeff Altrock; Melissa Bidwell; Paul O'Malley; Reinout Oerlemans; Ross Weintraub
- Production locations: Tampa Bay, Florida; St. Petersburg, Florida
- Editors: Sax Eno; Bryan Sandlin
- Production companies: 3 Ball Productions; 3BMG; Amazon Studios

Original release
- Network: Amazon Prime Video
- Release: November 5, 2021

Tampa Baes is an American reality television series about a group of lesbian friends in Tampa Bay, Florida. It premiered on November 5, 2021, on Amazon Prime Video.

== Cast ==
- Cuppie Bragg
- Marissa Gialousis
- Haley Grable
- Mack McKenzie
- Summer Mitchell
- Olivia Mullins
- Brianna Murphy
- Ali Myers
- Shiva Pishdad
- Melanie Posner
- Nelly Ramirez
- Jordan Whitley

== Episodes ==
No.	Title	Original release date
1	"Y2BAE"	5 November 2021
Brianna and Haley plan a Y2K-themed birthday party, but rival couple Summer and Marissa may be looking to crash the party. Cuppie and Shiva consider taking their relationship to the next level.
2	"The Best Ships Are Friendships"	5 November 2021
Hidden rivalries are revealed. Olivia's hard partying ways catch up to her, forcing Mel to come to her rescue. Marissa and Summer plan on moving in with Marissa's parents while their house is under construction. Cuppie plans a group tiki cruise.
3	"Baes Overboard"	5 November 2021
The rivalry between Brianna and Haley and Summer and Marissa carries over to a group softball game. Jordan struggles with how to come out to her grandparents.
4	"Battle of the Baes"	5 November 2021
Summer confronts Haley with shocking information about Brianna. Nelly looks for closure with her family as they struggle with her coming out. Olivia is unsure if her new romance is just a fling.
5	"Choose-A-Bae"	5 November 2021
Summer and Marissa's rivalry with Brianna and Haley continues. Cuppie tries to get her anxiety under control. Shiva has a crush on Reide. Summer gives Nelly an ultimatum.
6	"I Got You, Bae"	5 November 2021
Mel bonds with Cuppie and plans a fun day out. Mack tries to help Haley repair her relationship with organized religion. Marissa and Summer look to move into their remodeled house sooner than planned.
7	"The Family Bae"	5 November 2021
Cuppie tries to get all the Baes to be on good terms. Summer is visited by her parents, and shares her Native American history with Marissa. Haley finds out why Brianna is resistant to getting married.
8	"Bae Pride"	5 November 2021
The Baes make plans to celebrate Pride. Marissa asks Jordan to help her plan the perfect engagement for Summer. Haley begins to question her relationship with Brianna.

== Production ==
The series began filming in March 2021 and wrapped up in June 2021. The show's cast were in the same social circle before filming began. Melissa Bidwell is the showrunner.

== Release ==
The series was announced in July 2021. All eight episodes of the series were released on Prime Video on November 5, 2021.
