= Seven Deadly Sins (novel series) =

Series of young adult novels by Robin Wasserman

Seven Deadly Sins is a series of young kids' novels by Robin Wasserman. The plot follows a group of bankrupt teens living in the town of Grace, California. The series was published starting in 2005 through Simon Pulse and consists of seven books, each named after one of the seven deadly sins. The books by release date are Lust, Envy, Pride, Wrath, Sloth, Gluttony, and Greed.

The series was adapted into a TV miniseries in 2010 that starred Dreama Walker, Rachel Melvin, Jared Keeso, Reila Aphrodite, and Eric Close.

== Synopsis ==
The stories follow a group of teens as they battle with their desires and the backstabbing, cut-throat things they will do to get what they want—from betraying best friends to realizing they would do anything to get revenge on the best friend who wronged them.

== Books ==
1. Lust (2005)
2. Envy (2005)
3. Pride (2006)
4. Wrath (2006)
5. Sloth (2006)
6. Gluttony (2007)
7. Greed (2007)

== Characters ==
=== Harper Grace ===
Harper Grace is the 'it' girl at Haven High. Her great-grandparents founded the town. Ever since she was a little kid she had a crush on her best friend Adam who is the new girl Beth's eye candy. Harper is self-centered and uses the town as her personal playground with her best friend Miranda Stevens. They also use metrosexual Kane Geary to ruin people's lives. In the first few books she and Kane befriend the evil-minded Kaia Sellers to foil Adam and Beth's relationship, since Harper wants Adam and Kane wants Beth, all the while shoving off Miranda. Kaia has sparked a relationship with her teacher Jack Powell and mechanic Reed Sawyer. They fake a sex scandal using Kane and Harper while Kaia takes pictures which Kane later doctors to make it look as though Harper was Beth. They then sent the pictures to Adam causing him to believe Beth cheated on him with his best friend Kane and he breaks up with her.

Beth discovers it was actually Harper and Kane who caused the whole thing at Kaia's New Years Party. She had received drugs from Kane as a 'present' to help her loosen up. When she and Adam walk in on Kane giving a drunken ramble about what he and Harper had done, Beth and Adam decide to get back together and leave the two they were with. Kaia does not care for Harper and Kane but wanting to do something because she was in a good mood, walks out and with a few simple words insinuating what Adam and Kaia had done together Beth leaves him once more. Beth and Miranda get together to destroy Harper because of Harper betraying Miranda. This leads to a flyer being passed around the school about the different people — mainly Kane, Harper, Adam, and Kaia although there were a few others just to spread it around to not look like a personal attack. This does not work and Miranda and Beth stop working together.

Beth auditions to read a speech to the Governor but Harper cuts in to destroy Beth's chances. Harper wins by popularity and Beth went home angry. She looked to the drugs in her room and took them to school. She slipped one into Harper's water before her speech. Harper embarrasses herself in front of the entire school and runs out and into Kaia who, both wanting to escape Harper, takes the wheel and drive off. They go driving out of town and a red van wanders into their lane and crashes into the sports car killing Kaia. Harper starts having nightmares about Kaia and how it was her fault that Kaia was dead. Depressed, she tries to make things right but will not open up to anybody. In "Sloth" she realizes she has to live her life the way she wants and starts to let people in and opens up. In "Gluttony", Harper goes to Las Vegas and starts to begin her friendship with Adam again. Her plans take a turn for the worse when Beth admits she drugged Harper. Harper becomes angry and decides she is better off alone. At the end of the book she finds Beth about to jump off a roof but she teaches Beth that there is something to live for — you just have to find it.

=== Adam Morgan ===
He is the school basketball hero and best friends of Kane Geary and Harper Grace. He starts getting feelings for Beth as soon as she moves into Grace. He realizes that he has feelings for this girl until Harper wants to become more than friends. Everything seems to be going well until he realizes that Kane and Harper backstabbed him to break up with Beth. He avoids them and stays with Beth until he decides to cheat on her with Kaia. Beth then finds out and vows to get revenge over them. When Harper embarrasses herself at the school assembly he tries to help her but then she almost gets herself killed. He misses his best friend and wants to start his friendship with Harper again but she won't speak to him. He then starts failing all his classes and struggles on the team. He gets drunk at a party and has a fling with Miranda Stevens. They agree to keep it a secret from the rest of their friends. In "Gluttony", he and Harper become friends again. But after Beth gets hurt, he comes to her aid and Harper thinks that they are dating again and runs away. He saves Beth from suicide and starts to become friends with Harper once again, even through their rocky relationship.

=== Kane Geary ===
He is the school bad boy and Adam's best friend. He is Harper's partner in crime and moves on to a new girl each day. He wants Beth and Adam's new girlfriend and realizes that Harper wants the same thing. The new girl from New York hears their plan and wants to join up. One of Kane's flaws is that he tries to fend off Miranda Stevens who has a huge crush on him. He strikes a deal with a dealer to get Pot-Tarts, a new brand on the market in Gluttony. After Beth loses Adam he convinces her that it was all Harper's fault and gives her pills to spike Harper's drinks, even after they have a relationship. She slips the drugs in her drink and the whole thing goes to plan until Kaia dies. Beth starts talking about how she's going to turn the two of them in. He convinces her not to and is the only person who really doesn't care but wants to figure out what really happened that night. In "Gluttony", he convinces his friends to take a long weekend in Vegas. He books them all a room and looks forward to a night of partying. After taking the drugs from the dealer he decides not to pay but tries to set him up with Miranda who actually starts to like the dealer. Kane starts to get jealous and follows them around on their date. When he turns the dealer into the cops, Miranda thinks that he did it for revenge. He then admits that he had set the whole thing up so the dealer would give him the drugs for free. In the pool at the hotel, he and Miranda kiss, and he actually starts to have a real relationship with her.

=== Beth Manning ===
Beth Manning is the new innocent blond girl who becomes Adam's girl. Everyone thinks she would do nothing bad but she knows different when her teacher Mr. Powell starts to hit on her. Harper hates her because she is dating Adam. When she is embarrassed by Harper, Kane and Kaia, she retaliates against them by spiking Harper's drink after she breaks up with Adam, since he cheated on her. Kaia dies and she believes it was her fault. She starts to hate herself until she starts to have a relationship with pot-smoker Reed Sawyer and realizes she doesn't need to be popular, that she loves Reed and wants to be the groupie of his band. In "Gluttony" she sets up Reed's band in a Battle of the Bands deal in Vegas. She travels with them there but it takes a turn when she runs into her old enemies and Reed flirts with a pretty girl named Starla. She gets confused when Reed tells her he loves her and she runs away, afraid that he'll figure out that she killed Kaia. She then gets drunk and ends up being under Adam's wing. When Harper sees them together she lashes out but Beth tells her that she spiked Harper's drink. To get revenge Harper tells Reed what happened and he breaks up with her. Having no life and no boyfriend she goes to the roof of the hotel and tries to jump off but Harper, Adam and Reed convince her to get down and she realizes there is more to live for than just being happy.

=== Kaia Sellers ===
The evil-minded new girl from New York. She starts off by joining Harper and Kane's group, destroying Beth's rep, dating and sleeping with her teacher who is hiding a secret of his own, making Adam like her and just ruining people's lives. While in the car with Harper in the book "Wrath", she is killed although her death is not mentioned until the book "Sloth".

=== Miranda Stevens ===
Miranda is a smart, shy girl who has a huge crush on Kane Geary and is the redheaded friend of Harper. She spends most of the series being a tag-along and dreaming about a relationship with Kane. When Harper turns mute after the accident she wants her best friend back and tries to win her over. While tutoring Adam she's about to tell Kane her true feelings when she sees him with Harper. She knows that Harper has a crush on Adam and she ends up having a fling with him. At the end of "Sloth" she tells Harper that she is there if she wants to talk and goes on with her life. In "Gluttony" she goes to Vegas for her birthday and thinks its terrible after a bad spa-day, she thinks it will be the worst birthday ever until Kane sets her up with Jackson. Her date is ruined when Kane turns him in as a drug-dealer and thinks that he is trying to make her birthday terrible. She really gets her wish when Kane says that he likes her and after a bad fight with Harper she realizes she needs to keep what she has.

=== Reed Sawyer ===
Reed Sawyer is a mechanic. He goes out with Kaia and is devastated when she dies. He is a pot-smoker and has a rock band. He finally becomes happy when he realizes he loves Beth and talks her into smoking. He tells her he loves her but when she tells him she doesn't love him he does not know what went wrong. He then figures out Beth hated him because of what she did to Kaia. He breaks things off with Beth and becomes even more sad when his band loses until he starts a relationship with a girl named Starla. After Beth tries to kill herself he realizes that, no matter what, he loves her and that he has to move on from Kaia.
