= NYC Epicenters 9/11→2021½ =

American documentary miniseries

- Genre: Documentary
- Directed by: Spike Lee
- Music by: Terence Blanchard
- Country of origin: United States
- Original language: English
- No. of episodes: 4

Production
- Executive producers: Nancy Abraham; Lisa Heller
- Producer: Spike Lee
- Cinematography: Felipe Vara De Rey; Kerwin Devonish
- Editors: Adam Gough; Barry Alexander Brown
- Running time: 90–117 minutes
- Production companies: 40 Acres and a Mule Filmworks; HBO Documentary Films

Original release
- Network: HBO
- Release: August 22 – September 11, 2021

NYC Epicenters 9/11→2021½ (Note: Rendered in some program listings as NYC Epicenters 9/11 Through 2021 and a Half, or NYC Epicenters 9/11–2021, due to technical restrictions.) is an American documentary miniseries. The series follows the chronicle of life and survival in New York City, ranging from the September 11 attacks and the COVID-19 pandemic. It consists of four episodes and premiered on August 22, 2021, on HBO.

== Plot ==
The series follows the life, loss, and survival of New York City ranging from the 9/11 terrorist attacks and the COVID-19 pandemic.

== Episodes ==
No.	Title	Directed by	Original release date	U.S. viewers (millions)
1	"Episode 1"	Spike Lee	August 22, 2021	0.212
2	"Episode 2"	Spike Lee	August 29, 2021	0.163
3	"Episode 3"	Spike Lee	September 5, 2021 (Note: Episodes 3 was released on HBO Max on September 3, 2021, ahead of its weekly HBO premieres.)	0.200
4	"Episode 4"	Spike Lee	September 11, 2021	0.156

== Production ==
In March 2021, it was announced Spike Lee would direct and produce a documentary series focusing on the New York City for HBO, with HBO Documentary Films and 40 Acres and a Mule Filmworks producing. Lee conducted over 200 interviews for the series.

== Reception ==
=== Critical response ===
The review aggregator website Rotten Tomatoes reported a 100% approval rating with an average rating of 8.4/10, based on 5 critic reviews. On Metacritic, the series holds a rating of 86 out of 100, based on 6 critics, indicating "universal acclaim".

=== 9/11 truth movement controversy ===
The fourth and final episode of the series, as shown to critics for review, contained a half-hour of Lee interviewing members of the 9/11 truth movement, who promoted conspiracy theories that the towers were brought down by a controlled demolition. While the episode also featured scientists who disputed these claims, journalists who viewed the episode criticized Lee, saying that his handling of the content gave "equal voice to both sides". In an interview with The New York Times, Lee said, "The amount of heat that it takes to make steel melt, that temperature's not reached. And then the juxtaposition of the way Building 7 fell to the ground — when you put it next to other building collapses that were demolitions, it’s like you’re looking at the same thing. But people going to make up their own mind. My approach is put the information in the movie and let people decide for themselves. I respect the intelligence of the audience".

On August 25, it was announced Lee would re-edit the episode following criticism, with HBO removing the previous cut from a screener platform. The revised cut of the episode runs thirty minutes shorter, and excludes the interviews which promote conspiracy theories, though Abbey White of The Hollywood Reporter said that a segment in episode three, which presents conspiracy theories about United Airlines Flight 93, was not amended.
