= Mithai Kottu Chittemma =

Telugu language drama TV series

- Genre: Drama
- Directed by: Kavarthapu Venugopal
- Starring: See below
- Country of origin: India
- Original language: Telugu
- No. of episodes: 750

Production
- Production locations: Hyderabad, Telangana, India
- Camera setup: Multi-camera
- Running time: 22 minutes

Original release
- Network: Zee Telugu
- Release: 29 March 2021 – 19 August 2023

Related
- Mrs. Mukhyamantri

Mithai Kottu Chittemma is an Indian Telugu language drama series which aired on Zee Telugu. It premiered from 29 March 2021 and ended on 19 August 2023 completing 750 episodes. The show is an official remake of Marathi TV series Mrs. Mukhyamantri. It starred Nakshatra Srinivas and Rajeev Ravichandra in lead roles.

== Plot ==
The life of Chittemma, a humble and responsible owner of a sweet shop, takes an unexpected turn when she enters Kanthamma, an ambitious politicians family.

== Cast ==
=== Main ===
- Nakshatra Srinivas as Chittemma
- Rajeev Ravichandra as Aditya

=== Recurring ===
- Murleedher as Avataram
- Abhilasha as Neelambari
- Vijay Bhargav as Bhaskar
- Anusha Rao as Kanthamma
- Pundareek Komarraju as Kutumba Rao
- Venkat Govada as Kantha Rao
- Sravya Reddy as Latha
- Usha Sri as Kokilamma
- Rudra as Veeranarayam
- Sangeetha as Chitti
- Madhav as Kashyap

== Adaptations ==
Language	Title	Original release	Network(s)	Last aired	Notes
Marathi	Mrs. Mukhyamantri मिसेस मुख्यमंत्री	24 June 2019	Zee Marathi	12 September 2020	Original
Telugu	Mithai Kottu Chittemma మిఠాయి కొట్టు చిట్టెమ్మ	29 March 2021	Zee Telugu	19 August 2023	Remake
