= Raktha Sambandham (TV series) =

Indian Telugu television series

- Created by: Sky Media
- Written by: Dialogues; B.V Ramarao
- Screenplay by: Ravi Kolikapudi
- Directed by: B. Sravana Bhaskar Reddy
- Starring: Meghana Lokesh; Siddharth Varma
- Country of origin: India
- Original language: Telugu
- No. of episodes: 850

Production
- Producer: Sky Media
- Camera setup: Multi-camera
- Running time: 22 minutes

Original release
- Network: Zee Telugu
- Release: 9 April 2018 – 10 May 2021

Related
- Raja Magal; Kaiyethum Doorath

Raktha Sambandham (transl. Bond with blood) is an Indian Telugu-language television series on Zee Telugu and also in digital platform ZEE5, before TV telecast. It stars Meghana Lokesh and Siddharth Varma. The series premiered on 9 April 2018 with Gundamma Katha series. It has off-aired on 10 May 2021 with a mega episode.

== Plot ==
The story is about the loving relationship of two siblings, Krishna Prasad and Krishna Priya, sharing a strong bond. Priya adores Krishna Prasad and is even willing to sacrifice her own happiness for her brother’s needs.

Prasad's wife, Durgamma and Priya become pregnant around the same time. Due to social conditions and comments, Durgamma says she will die if she doesn't give birth to a male child. Unfortunately, Durgamma gets a girl, Tulasi. Priya gives birth to a boy, Adhitya. Later they are exchanged by their parents to save Durgamma's life. Only Prasad, Priya and her husband, and also Prasad's mother know the truth of the children's birth.

Durgamma always boasts about her son and insults Priya and Tulasi. Tulasi always enjoys fighting with Durgamma which annoys Durgamma. Then Tulasi and Adhitya fall in love with each other but Durgamma agrees to get them married. the rest of the story is about how Durgamma tries to separate the loving couple and how Tulasi overcomes the hard conditions and wins Durgamma's acceptance for their wedding. Tulasi and Aditya marry though Durgamma refuses to accept her. Meanwhile, Lakshmi, Aditya's former fiancée along with her grandmother and Durgamma plots against Tulasi. After many incidents and twists, Aditya and Tulasi learns about their true parentage and Durgamma accepts Tulasi as her daughter.

The story ends as Tulasi gets pregnant and gives birth to twin girls, though Durga expected twin boys. But a changed Durga accepts them wholeheartedly and they live happily ever after.

== Cast ==
=== Main ===
- Meghana Lokesh as Tulasi, Aditya's wife, Krishna Prasad and Durgamma's biological daughter, Priya and Sambaiah's adopted daughter
- Siddharth Varma as Adhitya, Tulasi's husband, Priya and Sambaiah's biological son, Krishna Prasad and Durgamma's adopted son, Lakshmi's former fiancee

=== Recurring ===
- Jackie as Krishna Prasad, Durga's husband, Priya's elder brother, Tulasi's biological father, Aditya's foster father
- Meena Kumari as Krishnapriya "Priya", Sambaiah's wife, Krishna Prasad's sister, Aditya's mother, Tulasi's foster mother
- Jyothi Reddy as Kanakadurga "Durga", Krishna Prasad's wife, Tulasi's biological mother, Aditya's foster mother
- Vasudha Kasul as Venkatlaxmi "Lakshmi", Rahul's love interest, Aditya's former fiancee
- Mahati as Dakshayini, Rahul's aunt and Tulasi's helper
- Abhi Ram as Rahul, Lakshmi's lover and The father of her child
- Chitti Prakash / Ajay as Sambaiah, Priya's husband, Tulasi's foster father, Aditya's biological father
- Lirisha as Satyavathi, Durga's sidekick

== Adaptations ==
| Language | Title | Original release | Network | Last aired | Notes |
|---|---|---|---|---|---|
| Telugu | Raktha Sambandham రక్త సంబంధం | 9 April 2018 | Zee Telugu | 10 May 2021 | Original |
| Tamil | Raja Magal ராஜாமகள் | 28 October 2019 | Zee Tamil | 27 November 2021 | Remake |
| Malayalam | Kaiyethum Doorath കൈയെത്തും ദൂരത്ത് | 30 November 2020 | Zee Keralam | 10 June 2023 | Remake |
