= Kalyanam Kamaneeyam (TV series) =

Indian Telugu language TV series

- Genre: Drama
- Based on: Kumkum Bhagya
- Written by: Dialogues: Tirumala Raju; Ravi Kiran
- Screenplay by: Ravi Vadla
- Story by: Poluri Krishna
- Directed by: Sai Venkat
- Starring: Meghana Lokesh; Madhu Sudhan; Haritha
- Theme music composer: Sunaadh Gowtham
- Country of origin: India
- Original language: Telugu
- No. of episodes: 477

Production
- Producer: K.V. Sriram
- Cinematography: P. Rama Krishna
- Production company: South Indian Screens

Original release
- Network: Zee Telugu
- Release: 31 January 2022 – 12 August 2023

Kalyanam Kamaneeyam is an Indian Telugu language television series airing on Zee Telugu from 31 January 2022. It stars Madhu Sudhan, Meghana Lokesh and Haritha in lead roles. Singer Mano debuted with this serial in a prominent role.

== Plot ==
Chaitra and her sister Mahi set out in pursuit of reuniting with their estranged mother, Seetharatnam. Along this journey, they meet the rockstar Viraj before heading to Seetharatnam’s shelter home. Hamsa tries to snatch Amma Odi. At some point, Chaitra works at Viraj’s home as a physiotherapist. Anand Varma falls for Chaitra and helps her with her problems. Chaitra then helps Anand’s mother in uniting Smiley and Anand.

== Cast ==
=== Main ===
- Meghana Lokesh as Chaitra and Alakananda alias nandu [dual role]; Chaitra as Viraj wife; Mahi's elder sister; Seetharatnam and Govardhan's daughter; Gomati daughter in law
- Madhu Sudhan as Viraj; Rock star; Chaitra Husband; Anand's younger brother; Gomathi's son
- Haritha as Seetharatnam; Chaitra and Mahi's mother; Govardhan's wife

=== Recurring ===
- Mano as Govardhan; Chaitra and Mahi's father; Seetharatnam's husband
- Amrutha as Mahalakshmi aka Mahi; Chaitra's younger sister; Seetharatnam and Govardhan's daughter; Prithvi wife; Nagavalli daughter in law
- Tulasi Yerra as Smiley; Anand wife; Viraj sister in law; Prithvi ex girlfriend
- Amar Sasanka as Prithvi; Mahalakshmi Husband; Nagavalli Son; Smiley ex boyfriend
- Ajay Satyanarayana as Anand; Smiley Husband; Gomati Elder son
- Ragini as Sarojini
- Malakpet Sailaja as Anand and Viraj's grand mother
- Indira Anand as Chaitra and Mahi's grand mother
- Roja Bharathi as Hamsa; Anand and Viraj's Aunt
- Swarna as Gomathi; Anand and Viraj's mother
- Charishma Naidu as Pregnant lady
- Usha Rani as Sarojini's sister in law
- Shravan Kumar as Shravan; Chaitra's ex-fiancé

== Adaptations ==
Language	Title	Original release	Network(s)	Last aired	Notes
Hindi	Kundali Bhagya कुमकुम भाग्य	15 April 2014	Zee TV	Ongoing	Original
Odia	Bhagyarekha ଭାଗେରେଖା	22 April 2024	Zee Sarthak	Ongoing	Remake

== Production ==
It is produced by television and film actor K.V. Sriram, under South Indian Screen production house.
