= Audie Award for Original Work =

The Audie Award for Original Work is one of the Audie Awards presented annually by the Audio Publishers Association (APA). It awards excellence in narration, production, and content for an audiobook not recorded from a pre-existing book or play released in a given year. It has been awarded since 1996.

== Winners and finalists ==
=== 1990s ===
Year	Audiobook	Author(s)	Narrator(s)	Publisher	Result	Ref.
1996 1st	Enjoying Italian Opera (1994)	Dale Harris	Dale Harris	HighBridge Audio	Winner	
1996 1st	A Prairie Home Christmas (1994)	Garrison Keillor	Garrison Keillor	HighBridge Audio	Finalist	
1996 1st	Whale Nation (1988)	Heathcote Williams	Heathcote Williams	Naxos Audiobooks	Finalist	
1997 2nd	Zeus: Thunderbolt from the Sky (1996)	Julie Fenster	Stan Winiarski	B&B Audio	Winner	
1997 2nd	Letters from the Earth (1962; written c. 1909)	Mark Twain	McAvoy Layne	The Audio Partners	Finalist	
1997 2nd	Your Present: A Half-Hour of Peace (1996)	Susie Mantell	Susie Mantell	Relax Intuit	Finalist	
1998 3rd	Diana, Princess of Wales: A Radio Tribute (1997)	BBC Productions	Full cast	Bantam Doubleday Dell Audio	Winner	
1998 3rd	Ambush at Fort Bragg (1997)	Tom Wolfe	Edward Norton	Bantam Doubleday Dell Audio	Finalist	
1998 3rd	How the West Was Read (vol. 2) (1996)	Robert J. Randisi	Lee Marshall and Kitty Brooks	DH Audio/Durkin Hayes	Finalist	
1999 4th	Haunted Cattle Drive (1998)	Connie Kingrey	Gerald Drake, James Ahrens, Jonathan Poland, Jackie Perlman, and Kevin Fitzgerald	K-tel International USA	Winner	
1999 4th	English As She Is Spoke (1998)	Donald Monat and June Dixon	Donald Monat and June Dixon	The Publishing Mills	Finalist	

=== 2000s ===
Year	Audiobook	Author(s)	Narrator(s)	Publisher	Result	Ref.
2000 5th	Song of the Unicorn (1999)	Susan Hammond and Debra A. S. Olivia	Jeremy Irons, Graham Harley, Phelan Landry, Robert Lurtsema, Catherine McNally, and Tracy Moore	The Children's Group	Winner	
2000 5th	Braces (1999)	Donald Davis	Donald Davis	August House	Finalist	
2000 5th	The History of Opera (1999)	Richard Fawkes	Robert Powell	Naxos Audiobooks UK	Finalist	
2001 6th	The History of the Theatre (2000)	David Timson	Derek Jacobi and full cast	Naxos Audiobooks	Winner	
2001 6th	Story Telling of Ferde Grofé (2000)	Ferde Grofé	Ferde Grofé	Stereo High Adventures	Finalist	
2001 6th	The Memory of Running (2000)	Ron McLarty	Ron McLarty	Recorded Books	Finalist	
2002 7th	The Life and Works of Chopin (2001)	Jeremy Siepmann	Jeremy Siepmann	Naxos Audiobooks	Winner	
2002 7th	Flight of the Voyager (2001)	Ferde Grofé	Ferde Grofé	Stereo High Adventures	Finalist	
2002 7th	Maressa & Merlone (2001)	Shaeri Richards	Shaeri Richards	Heartfull Productions	Finalist	
2003 8th	Getting to Know William Shakespeare (2002)	Joy Wake	Fred Child	Echo Peak Productions	Winner	
2003 8th	Dreams from the Lost & Found (2002)	Ferde Grofé	Ferde Grofé and full cast	Stereo High Adventures	Finalist	
2003 8th	Legacy (2002)	Doc Watson and David Holt	Doc Watson and David Holt	High Windy Audio	Finalist	
2003 8th	Pill Hill Quartet (2002)	Jay O'Callahan	Jay O'Callahan	Jay O'Callahan	Finalist	
2003 8th	Reagan in His Own Voice (2002)	Ronald Reagan	Ronald Reagan	Simon & Schuster Audio	Finalist	
2004 9th	New York: The Bronx 2004 (2003)	Soundwalk	Tony Morante	Soundwalk/Oversampling	Winner	
2004 9th	Garrison Keillor: A Life in Comedy (2003)	Garrison Keillor	Garrison Keillor	HighBridge Audio	Finalist	
2004 9th	Greatest Cartoon Voice Tricks Ever Smuggled Out of Hollywood (2003)	Pat Fraley	Pat Fraley	Fraley/Huber	Finalist	
2004 9th	The Killings Tale (2003)	W. A. Frankonis	full cast	Family Classics/NYS Theatre Institute	Finalist	
2004 9th	They Saw It Happen: Eyewitness Accounts from Ancient Greece (2003)	Matthew Lewin	Teresa Gallagher, Tom George, Steve Hodson, and Kerry Shale	Naxos Audiobooks	Finalist	
2005 10th	The Story of Classical Music (2004)	Darren Henley	Marin Alsop	Naxos Audiobooks	Winner	
2005 10th	Ground Zero Sonic Memorial Soundwalk (2004)	Kitchen Sisters	Paul Auster	Soundwalk	Finalist	
2005 10th	Heart of Troy (2004)	Ed Lange	Full cast	Family Classics/NYS Theatre Institute	Finalist	
2005 10th	Low Carb Yo-Yo (2004)	Barry Sears	Barry Sears	Oasis Audio	Finalist	
2005 10th	What Was Civil About That War…? (2004)	Megan Hicks	Megan Hicks	stories: (un)folding	Finalist	
2006 11th	Famous Composers (2005)	Darren Henley	Marin Alsop	Naxos Audiobooks	Winner	
2006 11th	Billy Collins Live (2005)	Billy Collins	Billy Collins and Bill Murray	Random House Audio	Finalist	
2006 11th	Eyewitness: 1940–1940 (2004)	Joanna Bourke	Tim Pigott-Smith	AudioGO/BBC Audio	Finalist	
2006 11th	Eyewitness: 1950–1959 (2004)	Joanna Bourke	Tim Pigott-Smith	AudioGO/BBC Audio	Finalist	
2006 11th	Eyewitness: 1960–1969 (2004)	Joanna Bourke	Tim Pigott-Smith	AudioGO/BBC Audio	Finalist	
2007 11th	Hasidic Williamsburg, Brooklyn for Men and Hasidic Williamsburg, Brooklyn for Women (2006)	Soundwalk	Joseph Piekarski and Pearl Gluck	OverSampling/Soundwalk	Winner	
2007 11th	Fundamental Cases (2006)	Alan Dershowitz	Alan Dershowitz	Recorded Books	Finalist	
2007 11th	Sherlock's Legacy (2006)	Ed Lange and Will Severin	Full cast	Family Classics/NYS Theatre Institute	Finalist	
2007 11th	Stories from the Storm (2006)	Carter Hooper, Celia Collins, et al.	Carter Hooper	Audible	Finalist	
2007 11th	The Hero of Cape Lonely Light (2006)	Geoffrey T. Williams	Dennis F. Regan	Geoffrey T. Williams	Finalist	
2008 13th	Sweeney Todd and the String of Pearls (2007)	Yuri Rasovsky	Phil Proctor, Simon Templeman, Moira Quirk, Martin Jarvis, Rosalind Ayres, Robertson Dean, and W. Morgan Sheppard	Blackstone Audio	Winner	
2008 13th	The Chopin Manuscript (2007)	Jeffery Deaver, David Hewson, James Grady, S. J. Rozan, Erica Spindler, John Ramsey Miller, David Corbett, John Gilstrap, Joseph Finder, Jim Fusilli, Peter Spiegelman, Ralph Pezzullo, Lisa Scottoline, P. J. Parrish, and Lee Child	Alfred Molina	International Thriller Writers	Finalist	
2008 13th	Hollowville (2007)	Mary Jane Hansen	Bruce Dern with music composed by Will Severin	NYS Theatre Institute	Finalist	
2008 13th	Hurricane Katrina (2007)	Pamela F. Pipes	Pamela F. Pipes and others	Tours BaYou	Finalist	
2008 13th	Sunday Mornings in Plains (2007)	Jimmy Carter	Jimmy Carter	Simon & Schuster Audio	Finalist	
2009 14th	Louis Vuitton Soundwalk, China: Beijing (2008)	Stephen Crasneanscki	Gong Li	Soundwalk	Winner	
2009 14th	Brainstorm: Using Science to Spark Maximum Creativity (2008)	Mariette DiChristina	William Dufris	Macmillan Audio	Finalist	
2009 14th	Many Things Invisible (2008)	Carrington MacDuffie	Carrington MacDuffie	Blackstone Audio	Finalist	
2009 14th	METAtropolis (2008)	John Scalzi, Elizabeth Bear, Jay Lake, Tobias Buckell, and Karl Schroeder	Michael Hogan, Alessandro Juliani, Kandyse McClure, Scott Brick, and Stefan Rudnicki	Audible	Finalist	
2009 14th	Sugar Pop Thoughts (2008)	Shayna Lance	Shayna Lance	CoolBeat Audiobooks	Finalist	
2009 14th	New Adventures of Mickey Spillane's Mike Hammer The(2008)	Falcon Picture Group	Stacy Keach	Blackstone Audio	Finalist	

=== 2010s ===
Year	Audiobook	Author(s)	Narrator(s)	Publisher	Result	Ref.
2010 15th	Tell Me a Story 3: Women of Wonder (2009)	Amy Friedman	Bryce Dallas Howard, Paula Poundstone, Wendy Hammers, Margot Rose, Jessica DiCicco, and Yvette Freeman	Listen & Live Audio	Winner	
2010 15th	The Copper Bracelet (2009)	Jeffery Deaver et al.	Alfred Molina	Audible	Finalist	
2010 15th	In a Nutshell: Darwin (2009)	Peter Whitfield	Peter Whitfield	Naxos Audiobooks	Finalist	
2010 15th	The Longest Night (2009)	Helen Engelhardt	Helen Engelhardt	Midsummer Sound Company	Finalist	
2010 15th	A Way with Words IV (2009)	Michael D. C. Drout	Michael D. C. Drout	Recorded Books	Finalist	
2011 16th	New Adventures of Mickey Spillane's Mike Hammer (vol. 2) (2010)	Max Allan Collins	Stacy Keach and full cast	Blackstone Audio	Winner	
2011 16th	The Alchemist and the Executioness (2010)	Paolo Bacigalupi and Tobias S. Buckell	Jonathan Davis and Katherine Kellgren	Audible	Finalist	
2011 16th	Fashionably Undead (2010)	Meg Cabot and the Twitterverse	Sarah Drew	AudioGO	Finalist	
2011 16th	Hearts, Keys and Puppetry (2010)	Neil Gaiman and the Twitterverse	Katherine Kellgren	AudioGO	Finalist	
2011 16th	William's Leap for Freedom (2010)	Renee Pringle and Sue Zizza	Dion Graham, Mirron E. Willis, and full cast	SueMedia Productions	Finalist	
2012 17th	METAtropolis: Cascadia (2011)	Jay Lake, Mary Robinette Kowal, Elizabeth Bear, Ken Scholes, Karl Schroeder, and Tobias Buckell	René Auberjonois, Kate Mulgrew, Wil Wheaton, Gates McFadden, Jonathan Frakes, and LeVar Burton	Audible	Winner	
2012 17th	Macbeth (2011)	David Hewson and A. J. Hartley	Alan Cumming, David Hewson, and A. J. Hartley	Audible	Finalist	
2012 17th	The New Adventures of Mickey Spillane's Mike Hammer (vol. 3) (2011)	Max Allan Collins	Stacy Keach and full cast	Blackstone Audio	Finalist	
2012 17th	Solaris (1961)	Stanisław Lem (trans. Bill Johnston)	Alessandro Juliani	Audible	Finalist	
2012 17th	Prayers: A Personal Selection (2011)	Various	Michael York	ChristianAudio	Finalist	
2012 17th	The Witches of Lublin (2011)	Ellen Kushner, Elizabeth Schwartz, and Yale Strom	Tovah Feldshuh, Barbara Rosenblat, and full cast	SueMedia Productions	Finalist	
2013 18th	Gun Church (2012)	Reed Farrel Coleman	Joe Barrett and John Keating	Audible	Winner	
2013 18th	Coming Home to Us (2012)	Helen Engelhardt and Marjorie Van Halteren	Helen Engelhardt and Marjorie Van Halteren	Midsummer Sound Company	Finalist	
2013 18th	Die, Snow White! Die, Damn You! (2012)	Yuri Rasovsky	Sandra Oh, Simon Helberg, Kate Burton, and full cast	Blackstone Audio	Finalist	
2013 18th	The Junkie Quatrain (2012)	Peter Clines	Christian Rummel and Thérèse Plummer	Audible	Finalist	
2013 18th	Titanium Rain (Episode One) (2012)	Josh Finney	Lance Roger Axt, Elizabeth Knowelden, Carrington Macduffie, and full cast	The AudioComics Company	Finalist	
2014 19th	Thirteen (2013)	Scott Harrison, George Mann, Mark Morris, Kaaron Warren, Martin Day, Gary McMahon, Cavan Scott, Dan Abnett, Alasdair Stuart, Kim Newman, Mark Wright, Simon Cark, and Johnny Mains	Barnaby Edwards et al.	Spokenworld Audio/Labroke Audio	Winner	
2014 19th	Ender's Game Alive (2013)	Orson Scott Card	Full cast	Audible	Finalist	
2014 19th	Letters to a Birmingham Jail (2013)	Martin Luther King Jr.	Dion Graham	eChristian	Finalist	
2014 19th	METAtropolis: Green Space (2013)	Jay Lake et al.	Dion Graham, Robin Miles, Mark Boyett, Scott Brick, Allyson Johnson, Sanjiv Jhaveri, Jennifer Van Dyck, and Jonathan Davis	Audible	Finalist	
2014 19th	Pete Seeger: The Storm King (2013)	Pete Seeger	Pete Seeger	Hachette Audio	Finalist	
2014 19th	Rip-Off! (2013)	John Scalzi et al.	Wil Wheaton, Scott Brick, Christian Rummel, Jonathan Davis, Stefan Rudnicki, and L. J. Ganser	Audible	Finalist	
2015 20th	Mandela: An Audio History (2014)	Nelson Mandela	Desmond Tutu, Nelson Mandela, and Joe Richman	HighBridge	Winner	
2015 20th	The Child (2014)	Sebastian Fitzek	Rupert Penry-Jones, Jack Boulter, Emilia Fox, Stephen Marcus, Robert Glenister, and Andy Serkis	Audible	Finalist	
2015 20th	Gadzooks! A Comically Quirky Audio Book (2014)	Adele Park	Garry Morris, Andra Harbold, Lesley Mendenhall, Abby Elvidge, Rhett Guter, Melissa Sandberg, Kent Hayes, Jack de Golia, and Steve Campbell	Straight to Audio Productions	Finalist	
2015 20th	Hamlet, Prince of Denmark (2014)	A. J. Hartley and David Hewson	Richard Armitage	Audible	Finalist	
2015 20th	Transparent (2014)	Jeffrey Tambor	Jeffrey Tambor	Audible	Finalist	
2016 21st	The Starling Project (2015)	Jeffery Deaver	Alfred Molina and full cast	Audible	Winner	
2016 21st	Carmilla (1872)	J. Sheridan Le Fanu	Rose Leslie and David Tennant	Audible	Finalist	
2016 21st	Drunken Fireworks (2015)	Stephen King	Tim Sample	Simon & Schuster Audio	Finalist	
2016 21st	Locke & Key (2015)	Joe Hill	Haley Joel Osment, Tatiana Maslany, and full cast	Audible	Finalist	
2016 21st	NPR American Chronicles: First Ladies (2015)	National Public Radio	Cokie Roberts	HighBridge Audio/Recorded Books	Finalist	
2016 21st	StoryCorps: Outland (2015)	David Isay	Ari Shapiro and full cast	HighBridge Audio/Recorded Books	Finalist	
2017 22nd	The Dispatcher (2016)	John Scalzi	Zachary Quinto	Audible	Winner	
2017 22nd	The Adventures of Tom Stranger, Interdimensional Insurance Agent (2016)	Larry Correia	Adam Baldwin	Audible	Finalist	
2017 22nd	Alien: Out of the Shadows (2016)	Tim Lebbon and Dirk Maggs	Rutger Hauer, Corey Johnson, Matthew Lewis, Kathryn Drysdale, Laurel Lefkow, Andrea Deck, and Mac McDonald	Audible	Finalist	
2017 22nd	Car Talk Science: MIT Wants Its Diplomas Back (2016)	Tom and Ray Magliozzi	Tom and Ray Magliozzi	HighBridge/Recorded	Finalist	
2017 22nd	In the Embers (2016)	Brian Price and Jerry Stearns	Robin Miles, Edwin Strout, Dean Johnson, Jacque Maddix, and full cast	Great Northern Audio Theatre/Blackstone	Finalist	
2017 22nd	Pete Seeger: The Storm King (vol. 2) (2016)	Pete Seeger	Jeff Haynes	Hachette Audio	Finalist	
2018 23rd	Romeo and Juliet: A Novel (2017)	David Hewson	Richard Armitage	Audible Originals	Winner	
2018 23rd	The Handmaid's Tale: Special Edition (2017)	Margaret Atwood and Valerie Martin	Claire Danes, Margaret Atwood, and full cast	Audible	Finalist	
2018 23rd	Mother Go (2017)	James Patrick Kelly	January LaVoy	Audible Originals	Finalist	
2018 23rd	Nevertheless, We Persisted (2017)	Amy Oestreicher et al.	Amy Landon et al.	Blunder Woman Productions	Finalist	
2018 23rd	Rebuttal (2017)	Jyotsna Hariharan	Phoebe Strole, Michael Crouch, Nina Mehta, Peter Ganim, and Dan Bittner	HarperAudio	Finalist	
2019 24th	Spin (2018)	Harvey Edelman and Neil Fishman	Jim Dale, Barrett Leddy, Lisa Livesay, Nicola Barber, Khristine Hvam, Nick Sullivan, John Brady, and Johnny Heller	HarperAudio	Winner	
2019 24th	Fandango at the Wall (2018)	Kabir Sehgal	Kabir Sehgal	Hachette Audio	Finalist	
2019 24th	Loki Ragnarok (2017)	Mark Binder	Mark Binder	Light Publications	Finalist	
2019 24th	Magus Elgar (2018)	Kennedy Phillips	Ricardo Cabral, William Violenus, Christopher Moore, Sandra Espinoza, Randy Nazarian, David Autovino, Kellen Goff, Brian Stivale, Kalinda Gray, Mandanna Wright, Kennedy Phillips, and Andrew Cornell	Kennedy Phillips/MelodyGun	Finalist	
2019 24th	The Old Cart Wrangler's Saga (2018)	Brian Price	David Ossman	Blackstone Publishing/Great Northern Audio	Finalist	
2019 24th	Splat! A Quirky Cat Audio Book (2018)	Adele Park	Eric Comeau, Luke Randall, Jove Trip-Thompson, Kent Hayes, Sherri Aldred, Garry Morris, Allie Boman, Adele Park, and Cindy Clemens	Straight to Audio Productions	Finalist	

=== 2020s ===
Year	Audiobook	Author(s)	Narrator(s)	Publisher	Result	Ref.
2020 25th	Evil Eye (2019)	Madhuri Shekar	Nick Choksi, Harsh Nayaar, Annapurna Sriram, Bernard White, and Rita Wolf	Audible Originals	Winner	
2020 25th	I Eat Men Like Air (2019)	Alice Berman	Elizabeth Evans	Audible Originals	Finalist	
2020 25th	Lustily Ever After (2019)	Stephanie Bentley and Miranda Ray	Stephanie Bentley, Carolyn Jania, and Henry Kaiser	ACX	Finalist	
2020 25th	Nevertheless, We Persisted (2018)	In This Together Media	Chorus of voices	Blunder Woman Productions	Finalist	
2020 25th	Our Harlem: Seven Days of Cooking, Music and Soul at the Red Rooster (2019)	Marcus Samuelsson	Marcus Samuelsson	Audible Originals	Finalist	
2021 26th	When You Finish Saving the World (2020)	Jesse Eisenberg	Kaitlyn Dever, Jesse Eisenberg, and Finn Wolfhard	Audible Originals	Winner	
2021 26th	Barack Obama: The 60 Minutes Interviews (2020)	Steve Kroft	Barack Obama and Steve Kroft	Simon & Schuster Audio	Finalist	
2021 26th	The Confederacy: Truth and Reconciliation (2020)	T Bone Burnett	T Bone Burnett	Audible Originals	Finalist	
2021 26th	The End of My Heart (2020)	Gayle Forman	Diane Kruger, Piper Goodeve, Gabriel Vaughan, Elizabeth Evans, Josh Hurley, Amanda Ronconi, Emily Bauer, Neil Hellegers, and Jesse Einstein	Audible Originals	Finalist	
2021 26th	Getting Started with Sourdough (2020)	Chad Robertson and Jennifer Latham	Chad Robertson and Jennifer Latham	Penguin Random House Audio	Finalist	
2022 27th	Heroine	Mary Jane Wells	Mary Jane Wells	Author's Republic	Winner	
2022 27th	Beatrix Greene	Rachel Hawkins, Ash Parsons, and Vicky Alvear Shecter	Shiromi Arserio and Alister Austin	Realm	Finalist	
2022 27th	The Man She Never Met	Annie Hulley	Annie Hulley	Bolinda Publishing Pty Ltd	Finalist	
2022 27th	No One Goes Alone	Erik Larson	Julian Rhind-Tutt and Erik Larson	Penguin Random House Audio	Finalist	
2022 27th	Sunset Springs	Kacen Callender	Qamar Yochanan	Audible Originals	Finalist	
2023 28th	Mrs. Wickham	Sarah Page	Jessie Buckley, Johnny Flynn, and a full cast	Audible Originals	Winner	
2023 28th	The Babysitter Lives	Stephen Graham Jones	Isabella Star LaBlanc and Stephen Graham Jones	Simon & Schuster Audio	Finalist	
2023 28th	Daffodils	Louise Beech	Lesley Harcourt	Bolinda Publishing	Finalist	
2023 28th	The River of Silver	S. A. Chakraborty	Soneela Nankani	HarperAudio	Finalist	
2023 28th	Star Trek: Picard: No Man's Land	Kirsten Beyer and Mike Johnson	Michelle Hurd, Jeri Ryan, Jack Cutmore-Scott, John Kassir, Fred Tatasciore, Chris Andrew Ciulla, Lisa Flanagan, Gibson Frazier, Lameece Issaq, Natalie Naudus, Xe Sands, and Emily Woo Zeller	Simon & Schuster Audio	Finalist	
2024 29th	Exodus: The Shanghai Jews	Kate McAll	Edita Brychta, Michael Canavan, and a full cast	L.A. Theatre Works	Winner	
2024 29th	The Debutante	Jon Ronson	Jon Ronson	Audible Originals	Finalist	
2024 29th	Nirvana the Amplifications	Michael Azerrad	Michael Azerrad	HarperAudio	Finalist	
2024 29th	Hellboy: A Plague of Wasps	Christopher Golden	Jasmine Hyde, Scott McCormick, and a full cast	Graphic Audio	Finalist	
2025 30th	Hellboy and the B.P.R.D.: The Goddess of Manhattan	Christopher Golden and Thomas E. Sniegoski	Marni Penning, Scott McCormick, and a full cast	GraphicAudio	Winner	
2025 30th	The Boar’s Nest	Rachel Bonds, Holly Gleason, and Dub Cornett	Mandy Moore, Ebon Moss-Bachrach, and a full cast	Audible Originals	Finalist	
2025 30th	Casanova LLC	Julia Whelan	Sebastian York, Julia Whelan, Edoardo Ballerini, and Johnathan McClain	Audiobrary	Finalist	
2025 30th	Earthlight	J. Michael Straczynski	Erik Braa, Pete Bradbury, and a full cast	Penguin Random House Audio	Finalist	
2025 30th	Two Can Play	Ali Hazelwood	Kelsey Navarro Foster	Spotify Audiobooks	Finalist	
2026 31st	The Big Fix: A Jack Bergin Mystery	John Mankiewicz, Jamie Napoli, Daniel Pyne, Katie Pyne, and Aaron Lipstadt	Jon Hamm, Ana de la Reguera, Alia Shawkat, Omar Epps, Erin Moriarty, Sosie Bacon, John Slattery, and a full cast	Audible Originals	Winner	
2026 31st	Doctor Who - Hooklight 1	Tim Foley	Peter Davison, Paul McGann, Janet Fielding, Sarah Sutton, Matthew Waterhouse, Kieran Bew, Alan Cox, Ruby Crepin-Glyne, David Holt, Celia Imrie, Harriet Kershaw, Shogo Miyakita, David Shaw-Parker, Theo Solomon, and Issy Van Randwyck	Big Finish Productions	Finalist	
2026 31st	Shot Clock	Andrew Bourelle	Emma Love	Dreamscape Media	Finalist	
2026 31st	What Could Go Wrong?	Scott Z. Burns	Scott Z. Burns	Audible Originals	Finalist	
2026 31st	The Making of Jackson Parrish	Liv Constantine	Ari Fliakos, Suzanne Elise Freeman, and Scott Brick	Penguin Random House Audio	Finalist	
