= The Bone Collector (novel) =

Book by Jeffery Deaver

- First edition
- Author: Jeffery Deaver
- Language: English
- Series: Lincoln Rhyme
- Genre: Crime
- Published: 1997 Viking Press
- Publication place: United States
- Media type: Print (hardback & paperback)
- Pages: 461 (paperback)
- ISBN: 978-0-340-99272-2
- Followed by: The Coffin Dancer

The Bone Collector is a 1997 thriller novel by American writer Jeffery Deaver. The book introduces the character of Lincoln Rhyme, a quadriplegic forensic criminalist.

It was adapted into a film of the same name in 1999. A pilot for a television series based on the novel was ordered by NBC in 2019. Though the pilot was made available through some services on January 1, 2020, it made its broadcast premiere on January 10, 2020.

== Summary ==
Two colleagues, T.J. (Tammie Jean) Colfax and John Ulbrecht, catch a cab at a New York City airport. After a brief ride through New York, they find themselves in an abandoned warehouse district. The cab's doors are locked, and the driver ignores their pleas to let them out.

The next day NYPD Patrol Officer Amelia Sachs is called to a possible homicide near some train tracks in Midtown. Her initial search is fruitless until she spots what she thinks is a dead tree protruding from the ground near the tracks. She climbs down the embankment, and as she gets closer she sees that it's actually a hand sticking out of the ground, with the flesh removed and a large diamond ring placed on one bony finger. She digs into the earth and uncovers the face of John Ulbrecht, who has been buried alive.

Amelia calls in and secures the area by stopping a train and traffic up above.

Quadriplegic and ex-forensic criminalist Lincoln Rhyme is waiting for a visitor at his apartment when the doorbell rings. His caregiver Thom answers the door and informs him that he has two unexpected visitors, homicide detectives Lon Sellitto and Jerry Banks. Rhyme tells Thom that he doesn't want to see them but ultimately agrees to speak with them.

Sellitto is Rhyme's former partner, and the officers are there to get Rhyme's help on the kidnapping and murder case, but he says he is in no state to help. Sellitto says that all he wants is for Rhyme to look over the case file and give them insight into what it means. The detective explains that the kidnapper still has one hostage they need to find. At this point Rhyme's expected visitor arrives, and he asks the detectives to leave, telling them he will read over the case notes. He finds himself drawn into the case and agrees to work on it with the help of Amelia Sachs as his eyes on the ground.

The killer is Peter Taylor, Rhyme's doctor. Real name Colin Stanton, he lost his family years ago when Lincoln failed to fully check out a crime scene. The suspect was hiding under a bed and started a shootout in the street, gunning down Stanton's family. Stanton subsequently had a breakdown and was admitted to a hospital where he attempted suicide. Once released, he planned to murder a now-quadriplegic Lincoln Rhyme and created the identity of Peter Taylor. The name was inspired by James Schneider, a New York serial killer from the early 1900s - "Schneider" is "tailor" in German. However, when Stanton/Taylor realized that Lincoln was becoming suicidal he had to give him a reason to live so that he could murder him. He took on Schneider's alias, "The Bone Collector", and began copying his crimes. Stanton picked his victims at random and thought of them as Schneider's own.

At the climax, Stanton coaxes his way into Rhyme's apartment, murdering Rhyme's former superior, Polling, who had come to admit his own guilt for his perceived role in Rhyme's accident. The investigating team had a witness to the crime Rhyme was investigating when he was injured and didn't need Rhyme's testimony. Stanton reveals his true identity to Rhyme, and his plan to murder all the people he cares about then slowly kill him. Following a struggle, Rhyme manages to bite Stanton's neck, tearing into an artery and mortally wounding him.

After Stanton is taken away, Rhyme is convinced to assist in another investigation and accepts the offer under the condition that he's allowed to continue working with Sachs.

== Characters ==
Lincoln Rhyme – Quadriplegic forensic criminalist who was the head of IRD (the NYPD's Central Investigation and Resource Division) before being involved in an accident at a crime scene where an oak beam fell on him, crushing his C4 vertebrae and leaving him only able to move from his shoulders up and his left ring finger. At the start of the novel, Lincoln is considering suicide with the help of Dr. William Berger, a representative of a pro-euthanasia group called the Lethe Society, until his ex-partner Lon Sellitto arrives at his apartment asking for help on a kidnapping case.

Amelia Sachs – 31-year-old police officer who is about to be transferred out of patrol. However, on the morning of her transfer, she is called to a possible homicide where she finds the first victim of the bone collector. Her work at this crime scene catches the attention of Lincoln Rhyme and she reluctantly becomes his "legs and eyes" as he takes on the case of the Bone Collector.

Lon Sellitto – Homicide detective working for the NYPD, who has been assigned the kidnapping case from the airport. He is a twenty-year veteran and the ex-partner of Lincoln Rhyme. He has also been given the unenviable task of persuading Rhyme to work on the case.

Thom Reston - Lincoln Rhyme's full-time care assistant.

== Series ==
Following the success of this novel, Deaver continued to feature Rhyme and Sachs in a series of subsequent novels. The series to date comprises:

- The Bone Collector (1997)
- The Coffin Dancer (1998)
- The Empty Chair (2000)
- The Stone Monkey (2002)
- The Vanished Man (2003)
- The Twelfth Card (2005)
- The Cold Moon (2006)
- The Broken Window (2008)
- The Burning Wire (2010)
- The Kill Room (2013)
- The Skin Collector (2014)
- The Steel Kiss (2016)
- The Burial Hour (2017)
- The Cutting Edge (2018)
- The Midnight Lock (2021)
- The Watchmaker’s Hand (2023)

== Adaptations ==
=== Film ===
The film adaptation of the novel, directed by Phillip Noyce and produced by Martin Bregman, was released on November 5, 1999. It starred Denzel Washington as Lincoln Rhyme and Angelina Jolie as a renamed Officer Amelia Donaghy. The cast also featured Queen Latifah, Ed O'Neill, Michael Rooker, Mike McGlone, Luis Guzmán, Bobby Cannavale, John Benjamin Hickey, and Leland Orser.

The film received mixed to negative critical reviews. It was the number one film its opening weekend, taking in $16.7 million. The film would earn $151.5 million worldwide.

=== Television ===
In November 2018, Variety reported that a television adaptation of the novel was in the works with a script by VJ Boyd and Mark Bianculli sold to NBC. The potential series would be executive produced by Boyd (S.W.A.T.), Bianculli, Alon Shtruzman, Avi Nir (Homeland), Peter Traugott (The Brave), and Rachel Kaplan (Wisdom of the Crowd). NBC ordered a series pilot in January 2019.

In March 2019, NBC cast Russell Hornsby as lead character Lincoln Rhyme as well as Michael Imperioli.

The series, now called Lincoln Rhyme: Hunt for the Bone Collector, focuses on Lincoln Rhyme helping to solve the most high-profile cases for the New York Police Department with the aid of Officer Amelia Sachs while the two attempt to catch the newly resurfaced serial killer known as the Bone Collector. It is also expected to draw from other books in Deaver's Rhyme series. It premiered on January 10, 2020, but was canceled in June of that year.
