= List of fictional portrayals of the NYPD =

The New York City Police Department (NYPD) has been the subject of many fictional or fictionalized portrayals in popular culture.

In the 1990s and early 2000s, two of the most popular American television programs portraying the NYPD were NYPD Blue and Law & Order. Both programs were notable for deliberately blurring fiction and reality: NYPD Blue was filmed using a shaky camera "docu-drama" style, while Law & Order promoted the fact that it engaged with issues "ripped from the [national] headlines".

== Television programs ==
The following television programs feature the NYPD:

- Barney Miller (1974–1982)
- Beauty & the Beast (2012–2016)
- Big Apple (2001)
- Blue Bloods (2010–2024)
- Brooklyn Nine-Nine (2013–2021)
- Brooklyn South (1997–1998)
- Cagney & Lacey (1982–1988)
- Car 54, Where Are You? (1961–1963)
- Castle (2009–2016)
- Copper (2012–2013)
- CSI: NY (2004–2013)
- Daredevil (2015–2018)
- Dexter: Resurrection (2025-present)
- Eischied (1979–1980)
- Elementary (2012–2019)
- Ellery Queen (1975–1976)
- Everybody Hates Chris (2005–2009)
- Everybody Loves Raymond (1996–2005)
- Fish (1977–1978) (spin-off from Barney Miller)
- Flatbush (1979)
- Forever (2014–2015)
- Golden Boy (2013)
- Instinct (2018–2019)
- Jessica Jones (2015-2019)
- The Job (2001–2002)
- Joe Bash (1986)
- Katts and Dog (1988–1993)
- Kojak (1973–1978, 2005)
- Hawk (1966)
- Law & Order (1990–2010; 2022–present)
- Law & Order: Special Victims Unit (1999–present)
- Law & Order: Criminal Intent (2001–2011)
- Law & Order: Trial by Jury (2005–2006)
- Law & Order: Organized Crime (2021–present)
- Life on Mars (2008–2009)
- Manifest (2018–2023)
- McCloud (1970–1977)
- The Mysteries of Laura (2014–2016)
- Naked City (1958–1963)
- Newton's Cradle (2021) (لعبة نيوتن)
- New Amsterdam (2008)
- New York Undercover (1994–1998)
- NYC 22 (2012)
- N.Y.P.D. (1967–1969)
- NYPD Blue (1993–2005)
- The Odd Couple (1965 play, 1968 film, 1970–1975 and 1982–1983 TV sitcom.)
- Only Murders in the Building (2021–present)
- Person of Interest (2011–2016)
- Prodigal Son (2019–2021)
- Shades of Blue (2016–2018)
- Swift Justice (1995–1996)
- Taxi Brooklyn (2014)
- Tarzan (2003)
- Third Watch (1999–2005)
- To Kill a Cop (miniseries) (1978)
- Top Cat (1961–1962)
- True Blue (1989–1991)
- Unforgettable (2011–2016)
- The Unusuals (2009)
- Yalla NY (2014) (يلا نيويورك)
- Witchblade (2001–2002)

=== Television episodes ===
- Thunderbirds
  - "Terror in New York City"

== In written works ==
(Alphabetical by author's surname)

- Shafer City Stories by Jesse Aaron (novel about patrolling in the NYPD's East Harlem precinct)
- Battle Tendency (1987–89), the second story arc of the manga series JoJo's Bizarre Adventure by Hirohiko Araki
- Darkhouse by Alex Barclay (Detective Joe Luchesi)
- Ellie Hatcher novels by Alafair Burke (Detective Ellie Hatcher)
- The Alienist and The Angel of Darkness by Caleb Carr (fictional Detective Sergeants Lucius and Marcus Isaacson; President of Board of Commissioners Theodore Roosevelt; former head of the Division of Detectives Thomas F. Byrnes)
- Heat Wave (2009), Naked Heat (2010), and Heat Rises (2011) by Richard Castle (Detective Nikki Heat; Detective Raley; Detective Ochoa; Captain Montrose; ME Lauren Parry)
- One Police Plaza (1984), Suspects (1986), Black Sand (1989), Exceptional Clearance (1991), Cleopatra Gold (1993), Pigtown (1995), Chains of Command (1999) written by William Caunitz, who retired at the rank of Lieutenant from the NYPD and commanded a detective squad while serving in the department
- The Mike Stoneman Thriller series, Righteous Assassin (2018), Deadly Enterprise (2019), Lethal Voyage (2020) novels by Kevin G. Chapman
- A Spirit of Evil by Lisa Cotoggio (Detective Michael Steiner)
- To Kill a Cop by Robert Daley
- The Coffin Dancer novels by Jeffery Deaver
- Lincoln Rhyme novels by Jeffery Deaver (Officer Amelia Donaghy; Captain Howard Cheney; Detective Kenny Solomon; Detective Eddie Ortiz; Detective Paulle Selltto)
- Precinct by Michael Grant
- The Leavenworth Case (1878) by Anna Katharine Green (features Police Detective Ebenezer Gryce)
- "The Cop and the Anthem" (1904), a well-known short story by O. Henry
- Mad Bull 34 (1986–1990) manga by Kazuo Koike. Also adapted into a four episode OVA (1990–1992) and spawned a sequel manga, Mad Bull 2000 (1999–2002) (Officer John "Sleepy" Estes a.k.a. Mad Bull, Officer Daizaburo Ban, Lieutenant Perrine Valley, Chief Alan)
- Detective First Grade by Dan Mahoney (Detective Brian McKenna, Detective Tommy Pacella, Chief Ray Brunette)
- Fort Freak, a mosaic novel edited by George R. R. Martin
- -FAKE- manga by Sanami Matoh (Detective Dee Laytner; Detective Randy "Ryo" Maclean; Jemmy J. "JJ" Adams; Chief Smith)
- 87th Precinct novels by Ed McBain (Steve Carella, Meyer Meyer, Arthur Brown, Eileen Burke, Cotton Hawes, Bert Kling and others); though the city is fictional, McBain's world is all but in name that of Manhattan's finest
- Perfect Pawn (2013), Queen's Gambit (2014), Small Town Secrets (2014), Bishop's Gate (2015), Little Boy Lost (2015), NYPD Cold Case - Katherine White Murder (2015), Knight Fall (2016), Brooklyn Bounce (2017), NYPD Cold Case - The Rosary Bead Murders (2018), Glass Castle (2019), Awakening (The Crystal Coven Saga Book 1) (2020) by Andrew G. Nelson (James Maguire, Alex Taylor, Detective Angelo Antonucci, Detective Karl Sigurdsson)
- Kate Mallory novels by Carol O'Connell (Kate Mallory, Louis Markowitz, Sgt. Riker, Lt. Coffey)
- The Michael Bennett series by James Patterson and Michael Ledwidge
- McKee of Centre Street by Helen Reilly (1933) (the first police procedural mystery to feature Inspector Christopher McKee of the New York Police Department)
- In Death series (1995–present) by J.D. Robb (Lieutenant Eve Dallas; Captain Ryan Feeney; Detective Delia Peabody; Detective Ian McNab))

== Film ==
The following films feature the NYPD:

- 1408 (2007)
- The Amazing Spider-Man (2012)
- The Amazing Spider-Man 2 (2014)
- The Avengers (2012)
- Across 110th Street (1973)
- American Gangster (2007)
- Arbitrage (2012)
- Around the World in 80 Days (2004)
- Bad Lieutenant (1992)
- Big Business (1988)
- Black Rain (1989)
- Blue Steel (1990)
- The Bone Collector (1999)
- Brooklyn's Finest (2010)
- City by the Sea (2002)
- Civil War (2024)
- Clockers (1995)
- The Corruptor (1999)
- Cop Land (1997)
- Cop Out (2010)
- Cotton Comes to Harlem (1970)
- Dead Presidents (1995)
- Deadly Hero (1975)
- Death Wish (1974)
- Death Wish 3 (1985)
- Death Wish V: The Face of Death (1994)
- The Devil's Own (1997)
- Die Hard (1988)
- Die Hard with a Vengeance (1995)
- Do The Right Thing (1989)
- Dog Day Afternoon (1975)
- End of Days (1999)
- The Exterminator (1980)
- FeardotCom (2002)
- The Fifth Element (1997)
- The French Connection (1971) and sequel French Connection II (1975)
- The Forgotten (2004)
- Fort Apache, The Bronx (1981)
- Five Minarets in New York (2010)
- Frequency (2000)
- Friday the 13th Part VIII: Jason Takes Manhattan (1989)
- Fritz the Cat (1972)
- Gangs of New York (2002)
- Ghost (1990)
- Godzilla (1998)
- The Godfather (1972)
- The Hard Way (1991)
- Home Alone 2: Lost in New York (1992)
- Hello America (2000)
- Inside Man (2006)
- Iron Man 2 (2010)
- It Could Happen To You (1994)
- Jungle Fever (1991)
- King of New York (1990)
- Léon (1994), also known as 'The Professional'
- Live Free or Die Hard (2007)
- Little Nicky (2000)
- Malcolm X (1992)
- Maniac Cop (1988)
- Maniac Cop 2 (1990)
- Maniac Cop III: Badge of Silence (1993)
- Mistrial (1996)
- Money Train (1995)
- My Name is Khan (2010)
- The Naked City (1948)
- New Jack City (1991)
- New York (2009)
- The Odd Couple (1968)
- One Good Cop (1991)
- One Tough Cop (1998)
- Once Upon A Time In America (1984)
- The Other Guys (2010)
- Pay or Die (1960)
- Pride and Glory (2008)
- The Public Eye (1992)
- Q&A (1990)
- Ragtime (1981)
- Ransom (1996)
- Remo Williams: The Adventure Begins (1985)
- Report to the Commissioner (1975)
- Righteous Kill (2008)
- Rumble in the Bronx (1995)
- Safe (2012)
- Salt (2010)
- See No Evil, Hear No Evil (1989)
- Serpico (1973) biopic about New York Police Officer Frank Serpico
- Titanic (1997)
- The Seven-Ups (1973)
- Scream VI (2023)
- Sgt. Kabukiman N.Y.P.D. (1991)
- Shakedown (1988)
- Shaft (1971) and its sequels (1972) and (1973)
- Shaft (2000)
- Spider-Man (1977)
- Spider-Man (2002)
- Spider-Man 2 (2004)
- Spider-Man 3 (2007)
- Spider-Man: Into the Spider-Verse (2018)
- Spider-Man: Across the Spider-Verse (2023)
- A Stranger Among Us (1992)
- Summer of Sam (1999)
- The Super Cops (1974)
- Super Fly (1972)
- Taxi (2004)
- Taxi Driver (1976 small cameos, ex. towards the end)
- The Taking of Pelham One Two Three (1974)
- The Taking of Pelham 123 (2009)
- West Side Story (1961)
- We Own the Night (2007)
- Who's the Man? (1993)
- The Wolf of Wall Street (2013)
- World Trade Center (2006)

== Music videos ==
The following music videos feature the NYPD:

- "Breathe" by Fabolous
- "Dick in a Box" by The Lonely Island featuring Justin Timberlake
- "Fairytale of New York" by The Pogues
- "Hate It or Love It" by The Game and 50 Cent
- "Locked Up" by Akon
- "Nookie" by Limp Bizkit
- "Mi Gna (Maître Gims Remix)" by Maître Gims and Super Sako featuring Hayko
- "One Mic" by Nas
- "If I Were a Boy" by Beyoncé

== Video games ==
The following video games feature the NYPD or fictionalized versions of the NYPD:

(Alphabetical by title or series title)

- Battlefield 3, in which the protagonists use a stolen NYPD police car to chase down a terrorist.
- Battle Arena Toshinden, which features NYPD Officer Tracy
- Driver: Parallel Lines by Reflections Interactive
- Fahrenheit (2005; Indigo Prophecy in US) by Quantic Dream
- The following Grand Theft Auto games feature the Liberty City Police Department (LCPD), which is based on the NYPD:
  - Grand Theft Auto (video game) (1997)
  - Grand Theft Auto III (2001)
  - Grand Theft Auto Advance (2004)
  - Grand Theft Auto: Liberty City Stories (2005)
  - Grand Theft Auto IV (2008)
  - Grand Theft Auto IV: Episodes from Liberty City including The Lost and Damned and The Ballad of Gay Tony (2009)
  - Grand Theft Auto: Chinatown Wars (2009)
- Hotel Dusk: Room 215 by Cing
- Max Payne by Remedy Entertainment/Rockstar Games
- Max Payne 2: The Fall of Max Payne by Remedy Entertainment/Rockstar Games
- Metal Gear Solid 2: Sons of Liberty by Konami
- Parasite Eve by Square Enix
- PAYDAY 2 by Overkill Software
- The following Spider-Man games:
  - Spider-Man (2002) by Activision
  - Spider-Man 2 (2004) by Activision
  - Ultimate Spider-Man (2005) by Activision
  - Spider-Man 3 (2007) by Activision
  - Spider-Man (2018) by Insomniac Games
  - Spider-Man: Miles Morales (2020) by Insomniac Games
- The Warriors by Rockstar Games
- The Godfather: The Game by Electronic Arts
- Tom Clancy's The Division (2016) by Ubisoft
- True Crime: New York City by Activision
