= Robert O. Bare =

United States Marine Corps general

Robert Osborne Bare
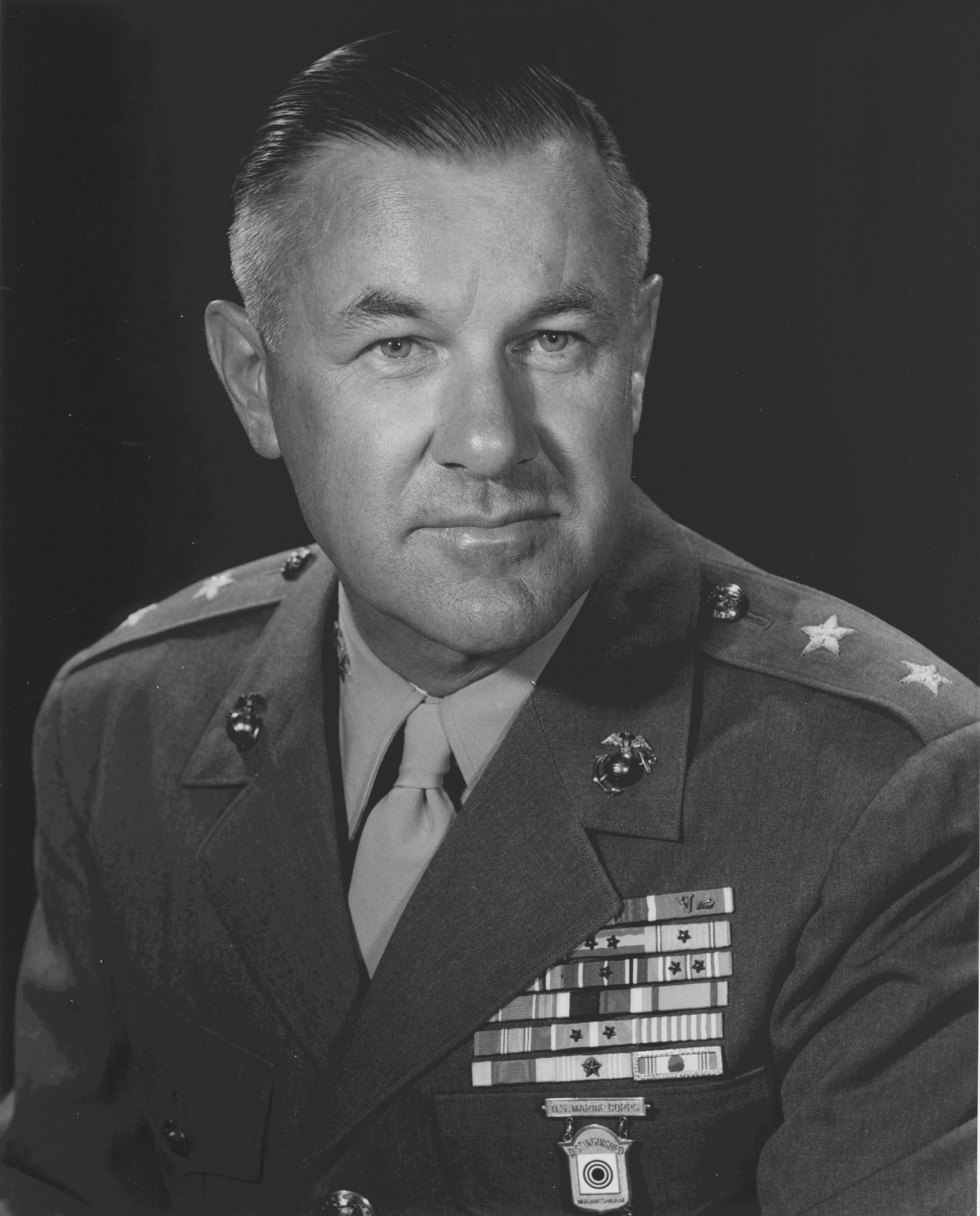
- Robert O. Bare as major general, USMC
- Born: June 18, 1901; Winterset, Iowa, US
- Died: September 30, 1980 (aged 79); Salinas, California, US
- Burial place: Scattered at Sea
- Military career
- Allegiance: United States
- Branch: United States Marine Corps
- Service years: 1924–1957
- Rank: Lieutenant general
- Service number: 0-3909
- Commands: Director of Personnel, HQMC; 1st Marine Division; ADC of 1st Marine Division; CoS of 1st Marine Division
- Conflicts: World War II: Invasion of Normandy; Palau Islands Campaign; Battle of Okinawa; Chinese Civil War: Operation Beleaguer; Korean War: Battle for Outpost Vegas
- Awards: Distinguished Service Medal; Legion of Merit (2); Bronze Star Medal

Robert Osborne Bare (June 18, 1901 – September 30, 1980) was a decorated officer of the United States Marine Corps, who reached the rank of lieutenant general. He is most noted for his work as chief of staff of 1st Marine Division during World War II and later as Assistant Division Commander of the same unit during Korean War. Bare later retired as commanding general of the 1st Marine Division.

== Early years ==
Bare was born on June 18, 1901, in Winterset, Iowa, as the son of local businessman, Benjamin F. Bare and his wife, a teacher Bertha Beerbower Bare. Young Robert was sent to the Severn School in Severna Park, Maryland, a preparatory school for the United States Naval Academy. He completed the school at the beginning of summer 1920 and subsequently received an appointment to the Naval Academy on June 9 of that year.

While at the academy, Bare was involved in the Track competition and also played for lacrosse and basketball squads. He graduated on June 5, 1924, and was commissioned second lieutenant in the Marine Corps on the same date. Some of his classmates also became general officers later: Harold P. Smith, Bernard L. Austin, Clarence Ekstrom, William V. Davis, Thomas C. Ragan, Aurelius B. Vosseller, Charles A. Ferriter, William H. Duvall, Henry W. Goodall, Francis J. Grandfield, Dale Harris, Edwin T. Layton, Hugh J. Martin, Bromfield B. Nichol, Gerald B. Ogle, Edward L. Woodyard or Charles L. Fike.

As any other newly commissioned marine officer, Bare was ordered to the Basic School at Philadelphia Navy Yard, which he completed during the following year. He was then ordered for expeditionary duty in Philippines in June 1925 and remained there until November 1927. Following his return, he was stationed at Quantico and was a member of Marine Rifle and Pistol Team until October 1929. Bare then served with the Marine Garrison at Guantánamo Bay, Cuba, before he was transferred as first lieutenant to the Marine detachment aboard the battleship USS Colorado in August 1934.

Upon his promotion to the rank of captain in 1935, Bare assumed command of the detachment. He commanded the detachment during the patrol cruises with Pacific Fleet until his detachment in May 1936. Bare was subsequently ordered to the Junior Course at Amphibious Warfare School within Marine Corps Schools, Quantico and graduated one year later. He then served as an instructor at Quantico, before he was ordered to attend the Army Command and General Staff College at Fort Leavenworth, Kansas in July 1939.

== World War II ==
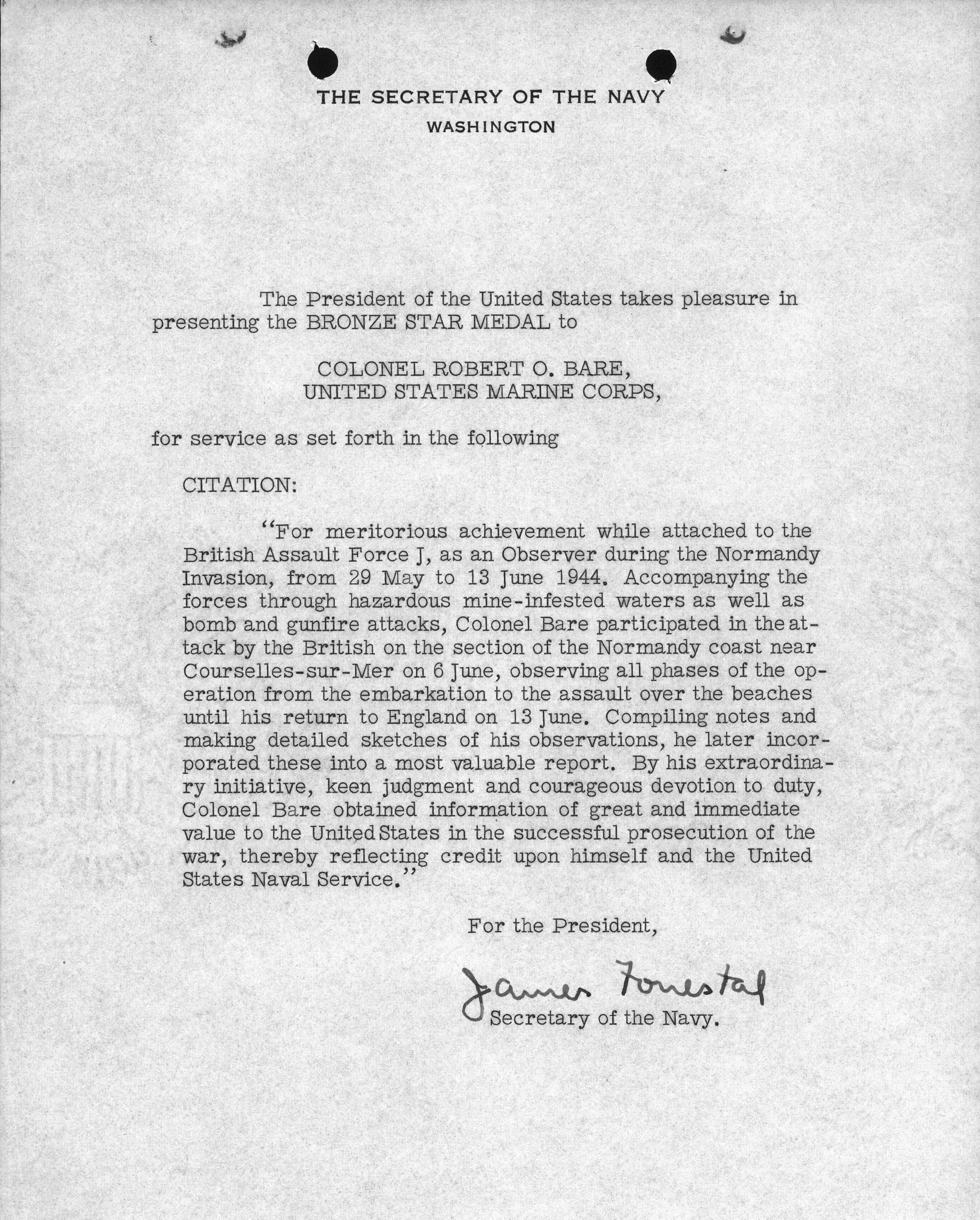
The Original Bronze Star Medal citation awarded to then-Colonel Robert O. Bare for his participation in the Normandy Invasion.

At the outbreak of the World War II, Bare served at the Marine Barracks Quantico, Virginia, and remained there until October 1942, when he was transferred to San Diego, California as operations officer (G-3) of the Amphibious Corps, Pacific under Major General Holland Smith.

Another important assignment came in June 1943, when Bare was transferred to London and assigned to the staff of Naval Commander-in-Chief of the Allied Naval Expeditionary Force, Admiral Bertram Ramsay as staff officer for plans. He participated in the planning of the Invasion of Normandy and later observed British Assault Force "J" attacking German forces near Courseulles-sur-Mer, incorporating his observations into his report. He was later decorated with the Bronze Star Medal with Combat "V" for his service in this capacity.

Colonel Bare was transferred back to the Pacific theater in October 1944 and assigned to the staff of 1st Marine Division. He participated in the final phase of the Palau Islands Campaign and succeeded Colonel John T. Selden as division chief of staff at the beginning of November 1944. Bare was appointed to this capacity following the Battle of Peleliu, where 1st Division suffered heavy casualties. New division commander General Pedro del Valle tasked Colonel Bare with the supervision of the re-equipping and training, which effected a virtual reorganization of the division.

Following five months of training, 1st Marine Division participated in the Battle of Okinawa at the beginning of April 1945. Bare took part in the amphibious landing and following the deployment of his headquarters ashore, he coordinated divisional units until the end of the operation. He distinguished himself again and was decorated with the Legion of Merit with Combat "V" for the training of the division and for his service during the battle.

== Korea and later service ==
Bare remained in Pacific area after the War and sailed with 1st Marine Division under Major General DeWitt Peck for new assignment to North China. First Marine Division was tasked with the repatriation of the Japanese armies, which remained in China after the surrender of Japan. He also took part in the combats with communists guerrilla units and returned to the United States in November 1945. For his service in North China, Bare was decorated with the Legion of Merit by the army and Order of the Cloud and Banner, 4th Class by the Government of Republic of China.

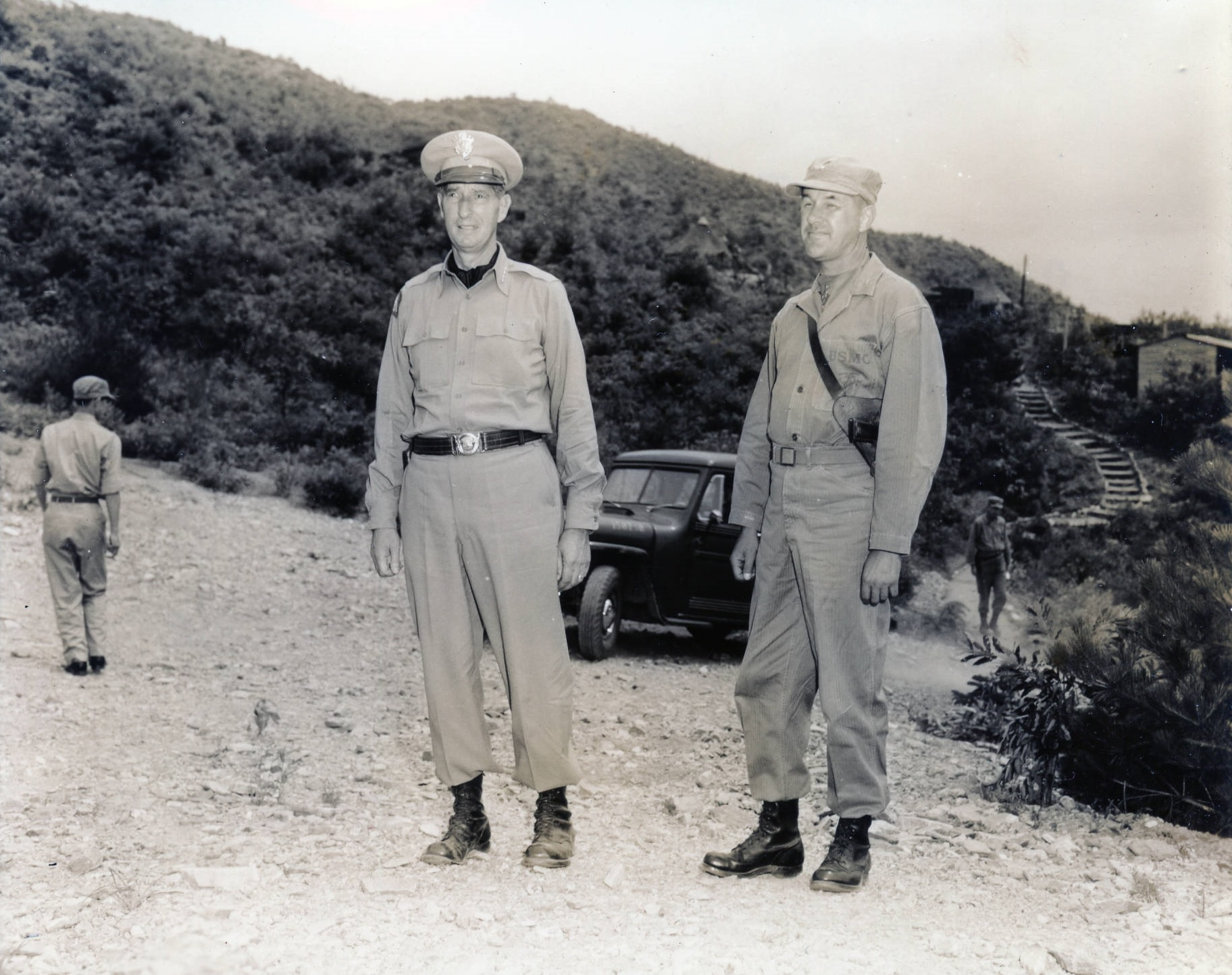
GEN Mark W. Clark, CINC UNC, (left) and BGEN Robert O. Bare, Assistant Commander, 1st US Marine Division, prepare to leave by helicopter for the 1st Commonwealth Division. They are at the M 06 Airstrip, 1st US Marine Div, Korea. July 13, 1952.

He then served on the staff of United States Fleet until September 1946, when he assumed assignment as an instructor at Naval War College in Newport, Rhode Island. He was transferred to Quantico in May 1948 and appointed director of the Senior Course at Amphibious Warfare School. Bare also served simultaneously as chief of staff of Marine Corps Educational Center at Marine Corps Schools, Quantico.

While in this capacity, he was promoted to the rank of brigadier general in January 1951. Bare was transferred to Camp Pendleton, California in June of that year and appointed commanding general of the Marine Training and Replacement Command. Because of the ongoing Korean War, he was responsible for the organization and coordination of recruit training of replacements for combat units in Korea.

General Bare was ordered to Korea in June 1952 and relieved Brigadier General Merrill B. Twining as divisional assistant commander of 1st Marine Division. Bare served under Major General John T. Selden during the "Outpost War", action along this line consisted of small, localized actions because much of the fighting revolved around the holding and retaking of various combat outposts along key pieces of terrain.

During the attack, he made frequent inspections of the front line tactical positions, coupled with his knowledge of military tactics and enemy methods, he was able to advise courses of action which led to decisions that contributed to the military successes of the division. Bare was in direct charge of directing, coordinating and supervising the construction and fortification of the extensive KANSAS line in the division sector and of making it into a position ready for occupancy on short notice. This involved many problems of tactics, coordination, construction and supply which he assisted in solving. He was subjected to the hazards of numerous uncharted mines and enemy artillery fire. The division was the first in the Corps to which it was attached to complete its organization of the critical KANSAS line.

Bare completed his tour of duty in April 1953 and was succeeded by Brigadier General Joseph C. Burger. For his service in Korea, Bare received Navy Distinguished Service Medal.

Upon his arrival stateside, Bare was appointed director of Marine Corps Development Center at Quantico, Virginia. While in this capacity, he was promoted to the rank of major general in February 1954 and appointed director of Marine Corps Educational Center Quantico. He remained at Quantico until June 1955, when he was transferred appointed director of personnel at Headquarters Marine Corps by Commandant Lemuel C. Shepherd.

Bare was ordered to Camp Pendleton in mid August 1956, when he was appointed commanding general of 1st Marine Division, a unit which he served with during most of his combat career. He retired from active service on July 1, 1957, after 33 years of commissioned service and was advanced to the rank of lieutenant general for having been specially commended in combat.

Lieutenant General Robert O. Bare died on September 30, 1980, in Salinas, California, where he lived with his wife Elizabeth Tracy Lowes. They have together one daughter, Nancy Jane Bare Lawrence, wife of Capt R.T. Lawrence, USMC.

== Decorations ==
Here is the ribbon bar of Lieutenant General Robert O. Bare:

| 1st Row | Navy Distinguished Service Medal | | | |
| 2nd Row | Legion of Merit with Combat "V" and one Oak leaf cluster | Bronze Star Medal with Combat "V" | Navy Presidential Unit Citation with two stars | American Defense Service Medal with Fleet Clasp |
| 3rd Row | American Campaign Medal | European–African–Middle Eastern Campaign Medal with one 3/16 inch service star | Asiatic-Pacific Campaign Medal with two 3/16 inch service stars | World War II Victory Medal |
| 4th Row | Navy Occupation Service Medal | China Service Medal | National Defense Service Medal | Korean Service Medal with two 3/16 inch service stars |
| 5th Row | United Nations Korea Medal | Order of the Cloud and Banner, 4th Class (Republic of China) | Korean Order of Military Merit, Ulchi Medal with Silver Star | Republic of Korea Presidential Unit Citation |

Military offices
| Preceded by Merrill B. Twining | Commanding General of the 1st Marine Division; 18 August 1956 – 30 June 1957 | Succeeded by David M. Shoup |
