= Broken window =

Broken window may refer to:

- Broken window fallacy, economic theory illustrating why destruction, and the money spent to recover from destruction, is not actually a net benefit to society
- Broken windows theory, criminological theory of the norm-setting and signaling effect of urban disorder and vandalism on additional crime and anti-social behavior
  - "Broken Windows", 1982 magazine article by James Q. Wilson and George L. Kelling that originated the broken windows theory
  - Fixing Broken Windows, 1996 book by George L. Kelling and Catherine Coles that further popularized the broken windows theory
- "Broken Window" (song), 2007 song by Arcade Fire
- The Broken Window, 2008 crime thriller novel by Jeffery Deaver

== See also ==
- Broken Windows, Empty Hallways, 1972 album by saxophonist Houston Person
