= Stone Monkey =

Stone Monkey may refer to:

- Sun Wukong, the Monkey King, a character in the Chinese novel Journey to the West.
- The Stone Monkey, a novel by Jeffery Deaver.
