= More Twisted =

2006 collection of short stories by Jeffery Deaver

- Author: Jeffery Deaver
- Genre: Crime fiction; Short stories
- Publisher: Simon & Schuster
- Publication date: January 3, 2007
- ISBN: 978-0-641-88396-5

More Twisted (ISBN 9780641883965) is a 2006 collection of short stories by American crime writer Jeffery Deaver. The book was published in 2006 by Simon & Schuster and is a follow-up to Deaver's 2003 Twisted. More Twisted contains fifteen previously published stories together with a new Lincoln Rhyme mystery.

== Stories ==
1. Chapter and Verse
2. The Commuter
3. The Westphalian Ring
4. Surveillance
5. Born Bad
6. Interrogation
7. Afraid
8. Double Jeopardy
9. Tunnel Girl
10. Locard's Principle (an original Lincoln Rhyme story)
11. A Dish Served Cold
12. Copycat
13. The Voyeur
14. The Poker Lesson
15. Ninety-eight Point Six
16. A Nice Place to Visit

== Publication details ==
- Deaver, Jeffery (2006). More Twisted: Collected Stories, Volume II. Simon & Schuster. ISBN 978-0-641-88396-5.
