= Twisted (short story collection) =

2003 collection of short stories by Jeffery Deaver

- First edition
- Author: Jeffery Deaver
- Language: English
- Publication date: 2003

Twisted (ISBN 0743260953) is a 2003 collection of short stories by crime writer Jeffery Deaver. The book was published by Simon & Schuster in 2003 and features 16 short stories, including one featuring Deaver's fictional detective Lincoln Rhyme.

== Stories ==
1. Without Jonathan
2. The Weekender
3. For Services Rendered
4. Beautiful
5. The Fall Guy
6. Eye To Eye
7. Triangle
8. All The World's A Stage
9. Gone Fishing
10. Nocturne
11. Lesser-Included Offense
12. The Blank Card
13. The Christmas Present (an original Lincoln Rhyme story)
14. Together
15. The Widow of Pine Creek
16. The Kneeling Soldier

== More Twisted ==
A second collection of stories entitled More Twisted was published in 2006 by Simon & Schuster. This collection contains fifteen previously published stories together with another new Lincoln Rhyme mystery.
