= The Vanished Man =

Book by Jeffery Deaver

- First edition
- Author: Jeffery Deaver
- Language: English
- Series: Lincoln Rhyme series
- Genre: Mystery, crime, thriller
- Publisher: Simon & Schuster
- Publication date: March 11, 2003
- Publication place: United States
- Media type: Print (hardback & paperback)
- Pages: 528 pp (paperback edition)
- ISBN: 0-7434-3781-0 (paperback edition)
- OCLC: 55981159
- Preceded by: The Stone Monkey
- Followed by: The Twelfth Card

The Vanished Man is a forensic crime mystery by American writer Jeffery Deaver, featuring the quadriplegic criminalist Lincoln Rhyme and his partner Amelia Sachs. It is the fifth novel in the Lincoln Rhyme series, which began with The Bone Collector.

== Plot introduction ==
The story centers around a serial killer loose in New York City whose slayings are patterned after illusionist tricks. When the killer illusionist uses his tricks to baffle and evade police, forensic expert Lincoln Rhyme and his longtime partner Amelia Sachs are brought in to investigate, setting off a tense cat-and-mouse chase where nothing is as it seems.

=== Explanation of the novel's title ===
The novel's title is a specific reference to an illusionist trick where a person is made to disappear and then reappear. It also alludes to the killer in the novel, who is quite talented at disappearing soon after his crimes are committed.

== Plot ==
The plot starts off with an introduction by Malerick, the antagonist in the story. Speaking in patter to his imaginary 'Revered Audience', he introduces the first trick he shall perform, The Lazy Hangman. The first victim is first cuffed at the hands and a cord is slipped over her neck. The other end of the cord is tied to her feet, and as the victim's legs tend to straighten over time, the cord around her neck is tightened and the victim strangles herself. However, Malerick is caught after committing the act by two patrol officers and flees the scene. The officers corner him in a locked room where he claims to have a hostage. They hear a gunshot, but when they charge in they find that the room is empty. Lincoln Rhyme is pulled into the case by Lon Sellitto, and through their combined effort, discovers that the killer had escaped from the scene much earlier, using a quick-change technique used by magicians (among other performers). The remaining evidence at the scene also points to a professional magician, hence Rhyme decides to rope in yet another civilian consultant: Kara, an aspiring magician.

Kara helps the team with some insights on the tricks performed by Malerick, and decides to stay on with the investigation. At the same time, Malerick has tracked down his next victim for his next trick, Sawing a Woman in Half. He escapes the cops closing in using another quick-change. The victim was found with a watch smashed at exactly 12 noon. (Earlier, a watch was found beside the first victim, the time displayed is 8 a.m.) This leads the police to believe that the next victim would be at four in the afternoon, but Kara tells them about misdirection: leading the audience to believe one thing when the performer intends to do another. Rhyme investigates the trace evidence found at the scene and believes the next victim will be at Central Park.

Meanwhile, another case is introduced parallel to the running plot. Charles Grady, an assistant district attorney who specialises in convicting criminals. Grady is involved in prosecuting Andrew Constable, who leads an extremist movement called the Patriot Assembly. Grady had received death threats for his involvement in this case, and Roland Bell has been brought in to secure his safety until the trial is over.

At about 2 p.m, the police and ESU surround Central Park, closing in on Malerick as he performs the Water Torture Cell on his next victim. He fakes a gunshot and escapes into a fair. Sachs gives chase with Kara, and as Sachs searches for Malerick, Kara is believed to be stabbed, causing a commotion in the crowd. Malerick escapes the fair and is chased by another police officer. Kara is revealed to be alive, faking her own stabbing to flush the killer out. Malerick gets to his stolen getaway vehicle and Sachs gives chase, getting the left front fender of her Camaro smashed in the process. However, the car Malerick was driving was run into the Harlem River. The police believe Malerick to be dead.

At eight p.m that night, Charles Grady is scheduled to attend his daughter's piano recital, but Rhyme had discovered that there will be a hitman coming for him then. An arrest is made when a reverend with connections to the Patriot Assembly approaches Grady's car with a pistol. After a relatively successful day, Thom demands that Rhyme rests. During this period, Malerick slips into Rhyme's room using an officer's uniform he obtained earlier and sets fire to Rhyme's room. Rhyme survives via the timely arrival of the fire department. Malerick mentions the name of his final trick, the Burning Mirror, to Rhyme. Kara traces the trick to Erick Weir, a magician whose wife died in a circus fire some years ago. Weir himself survived with severe burns, which fit the profile given by earlier witnesses.

The team learns that the circus Cirque Fantistique is performing in New York over the weekend. The owner, Kadesky, owned the circus which got Weir's wife killed. The team believes that Malerick may be targeting Cirque Fantistique's show over the weekend, but dismisses it as misdirection as Weir is arrested breaking into Grady's apartment. Weir is locked up in a detention centre, but escapes yet again, faking his own killing by firing an officer's gun.

Yet another hitman from the Patriot Assembly is sent for Grady's life, but his attempt backfired. Constable awaits for Malerick's arrival, believing that the Patriot Assembly had hired him to rescue him. However, the misdirection is finally revealed as Rhyme exposes Malerick's plan to set fire to the Cirque Fantistique performing that night. Malerick is arrested in his apartment, where he is revealed to be Erick Weir's former apprentice, Arthur Loesser. The fire that destroyed Erick Weir's life also changed that of his apprentice; Weir died shortly after the fire and Loesser has been planning revenge ever since. He has been leading the police to believe that Weir committed the crimes.

Towards the end of the novel, Rhyme pulls off a short performance in front of Kadesky with Kara, requesting that she be allowed to join Cirque Fantistique by pretending that she was Loesser's accomplice so that she could demonstrate her own skills. Sachs, having excelled at trying for the rank of sergeant earlier in the novel, is suspended from duty by Congressman Victor Ramos, who was forced away from the Harlem River crash by Sachs when he was allegedly trying to rescue anyone in the car despite Sachs arguing that nobody was inside (it is all-but-explicitly acknowledged that Ramos would be up for re-election soon and may have attempted the 'rescue' for publicity). She is reinstated shortly after, and is promoted to Detective Third Class. The end of the novel introduces Sachs' decision to get her car painted red, which is featured in the subsequent novels.

== Characters in The Vanished Man ==
Series regulars:

- Lincoln Rhyme, forensic criminalist
- Amelia Sachs, NYPD detective
- Lon Sellitto, NYPD detective
- Roland Bell, NYPD lieutenant
- Mel Cooper, forensic scientist
- Thom Reston, Rhyme's personal caregiver

Characters featured in this novel:

- Kara, aspiring illusionist
- Arthur Loesser/Malerick/The Conjurer, serial killer
- Edward Kadesky, owner/operator of Cirque Fantastique
- Charles Grady, District Attorney
- Andrew Constable, leader of radical militia
