= The Empty Chair (novel) =

2000 novel by Jeffery Deaver

- Author: Jeffery Deaver
- Language: English
- Series: Lincoln Rhyme series
- Genre: Crime
- Publisher: Simon & Schuster
- Publication date: May 9, 2000
- Media type: Print (hardback & paperback)
- Pages: 416
- ISBN: 978-0-684-85563-9
- OCLC: 46685015
- Preceded by: The Coffin Dancer
- Followed by: The Stone Monkey

The Empty Chair is a crime novel by American writer Jeffery Deaver, published in 2000. It is the third novel in a series featuring Lincoln Rhyme; the first of which was made into a movie, The Bone Collector.

== Plot summary ==
Lincoln Rhyme is in North Carolina with his aide Thom and his companion and partner Amelia Sachs in order to receive experimental spine surgery, which may improve or further worsen his C4 quadriplegic disability. Whilst there they are approached by a local police sheriff- Jim Bell, the cousin of Rhyme's NYPD colleague Roland Bell- and asked to help in a local case of kidnap and possible rape. They believe the kidnapper to be a local orphaned boy 'Garret', who is believed to be involved in a number of other murders and assaults. One of these involves a hornets nest being thrown at a woman, who suffers a heart attack after 137 stings, and dies. Garret is locally nicknamed 'The insect boy', due to his incredible love of insects. At the start of the novel a nurse, Lydia, is kidnapped by Garret when she visits the place where the first victim- 'Mary-Beth' was kidnapped. A police deputy is killed by a hidden hornets nest whilst searching Garret's hide-out.

Lincoln reluctantly agrees to help, and he and Sachs track Garret from the trace evidence found at the scenes. Meanwhile we follow Garret and Lydia as he takes her back to his main hideout. After Rhyme cunningly outwits Garret, he is arrested and Sachs is allowed to question him in order to find out where Mary-Beth is being hidden. Garret tells her it was "The man in the tan overalls" and Sachs believes him, however none of the rest of the police department do. She subsequently breaks him out of jail.

The rest of the police, including Rhyme, are trying to track her down, and as they come up close Sachs accidentally shoots one of the deputies dead. She is distraught, and is now being hunted for murder. Eventually they reach Garret's safe house, where he reveals that he was lying about the man in the tan overalls, but he never meant to hurt Mary-Beth. Once a small group of police arrive, along with Thom and Rhyme, they are attacked by a group of local gun-nuts who are attempting to get the reward of $2000 that Mary-Beth's mother has put up. They shoot several deputies dead and are eventually killed by Sachs and one of the deputies, Lucy. Inside the hut it is revealed that Thom has been shot.

Back in town, Sachs and Garret are in jail and Thom is in the hospital. Rhyme is curious and thinks things do not fit into place correctly, and eventually confides in Bell that he believes the murders in the town are accountable to a local businessman manufacturing an illegal pesticide. Anyone asking questions about why they were getting ill were killed. It is revealed that numerous deputies in the department are 'in' on the scheme, and have even helped in killing some of the townsfolk. Rhyme also says that he believes that the businessman had Garret's family killed, and a car crash framed, because they refused to sell the land around their house so the businessman could have shipments of the pesticide transported up the river.

It is at this point that Bell reveals he is in on it, and attempts to murder Rhyme with a sample of the harmful pesticide they have been analyzing. Lucy, the deputy who helped shoot the gun nuts earlier, is listening and they run in and restrain Bell, who is frustrated to see that Rhyme has tricked him and the sample of the pesticide was merely 'moonshine'. He is arrested.

Garret is freed, Mary-Beth has dropped the charges, as Garret was acting to defend her. She unearths the remains of his family, and it earns her a spot on the list of people who are a risk to the business. Sachs is still in jail and is accepting a guilty plea in return for a reduced sentence of 5 years in prison. She is about to be sentenced when Rhyme bursts in with evidence that the deputy she shot was in on the murders, allowing Sachs to be freed on the grounds that her victim was a criminal engaged in pursuit of an officer and thus legitimately making her 'crime' self-defence.

Later, Rhyme is in hospital, Thom is going to live and Rhyme is going to undergo the major spine surgery he has postponed while he searched for Mary-Beth. As he is wheeled in, Lydia, the nurse who had been kidnapped earlier, follows him in apparently to thank him and wish him luck. As he is going under anesthesia she reveals to him that she was the sheriff's mistress, and had been reporting who in the town had developed cancer due to pesticide poisoning so that those people could be silenced. As he is trying to fight off the effects of the anesthesia she ominously tells him "accidents happen in spinal surgery". Luckily Sachs notices that Lydia entered a closed surgery ward, and remembers that she is not a neurosurgery nurse, but an oncology nurse, and runs in, realizing what is going to happen.

The novel ends with Rhyme, Sachs, Lucy, Thom and Garret in the local cemetery. They are burying the remains of Garret's family. It is hinted that Lucy is to become Garret's foster mother. Rhyme does not have the surgery and is now back on the ventilator, after going into shock as Lydia attempted to stop his oxygen flow, requiring another year to regain his original physical status until he is fit to have the operation again.

== Notes ==
The title of the novel alludes to a form of Gestalt therapy called the empty chair technique where the patient speaks to an empty chair that they imagine has a person they wish to talk to sitting in it. In the novel, Sachs uses it on Garret despite not being a trained therapist, and as a result learns several valuable clues to the ultimate solution to the case.

The novel also denotes the "fish out of water" situation for Rhymes and Sachs. They do not know the local terrain (like they know New York City) nor do they have access to most of the latest technology in criminology. However, both criminologists work with the available data, both in the first half of the novel, where they successfully track Garret despite his false clues, and in the second half, which is something of a duel between Sachs and Rhyme as Rhyme is hunting Sachs, and both anticipate the other's moves.
