= Manhattan Is My Beat =

1988 crime novel by Jeffery Deaver

- First edition
- Author: Jeffery Deaver
- Language: English
- Series: Rune Trilogy
- Genre: Crime
- Publisher: Bantam Books
- Publication date: 1988
- Media type: Print (Hardback & Paperback)
- Pages: 228
- ISBN: 0-553-28061-9
- OCLC: 45328078
- Preceded by: None
- Followed by: Death of a Blue Movie Star

Manhattan Is My Beat is a crime novel by American writer Jeffery Deaver. Published in 1988, it is both the first novel in the Rune trilogy as well as Deaver's debut novel.

== Synopsis ==
Rune is a street-wise twenty-year-old, not long arrived in New York City, but she's already found herself a squat in an empty loft. She's also landed a job in a video store, Washington Square Video, that lets her pursue her interest in old movies; it's also where she meets Mr. Kelly, a lonely old man who rents the same tape over and over: a crime film based on a true story called Manhattan Is My Beat.

When Rune goes to visit him for a routine tape collection and finds him dead, the police suspect a robbery. However, Rune is convinced that the true answer to the mystery lies with the tape of Manhattan Is My Beat. This conviction draws her into a dangerous adventure against those who will stop at nothing to hide the truth and don't believe in Hollywood endings.

== Other media ==
Manhattan Is My Beat has been optioned by Double B Productions. The novel is being adapted by Double B Partners, John and Lisa Bishop.
