= The Devil's Teardrop =

1999 book by Jeffery Deaver

- First edition (publ. Simon & Schuster)
- Author: Jeffery Deaver
- Language: English
- Publisher: Simon & Schuster
- Publication date: 1999
- ISBN: 0-684-85292-6 (first edition)
- Dewey Decimal: 813.54
- LC Class: PS3554.E1755 D48

The Devil's Teardrop is a 1999 novel by author Jeffery Deaver, first published by Simon & Schuster. Like many of Deaver’s works, it is a suspense-crime novel with several plot twists. Deaver, whose suspense fiction has been hailed as "a thrill ride between covers" by the Los Angeles Times, imagines a chilling scenario: a killer set unleash a devastating plot of murder and mayhem on the last night of the millennium. The devil's teardrop is also a nickname for obsidian.

It was the basis for the 2010 TV movie of the same name, starring Tom Everett Scott and Natasha Henstridge.

== Plot summary ==
On New Year's Eve morning, 1999, in Dupont Circle, Washington, D.C., a killer referred to as 'the Digger' guns down tens of innocent people at the metro station. A man, Gilbert Havel, sends a letter to the Mayor Gerald Kennedy demanding twenty million dollars cash to be dropped off at a park near Interstate 66 in bags. The letter goes on to explain that if his demands are not met the Digger will continue to strike at secret locations – at 4 p.m., 8 p.m. and at Midnight. Kennedy decides to deliver the money to the extortionist to ensure no more innocents are harmed, and to make sure the town doesn't lose faith in the Mayor as election time is nearing.

Agent Margret Lukas, the agent responsible for the case, wants to either put tracking on the bags, or take the extortionist down when he comes for the money. However, Havel is killed in a hit-and-run incident before he can make it to the drop-off point.

All that Agent Margret has now is a letter, a dead body, and the knowledge that since the Digger had not been called off he will continue to continue with the remaining attacks. Assisting her in the investigation are officer Len Hardy and Detective Cage.

At his home, retired FBI Document Examiner Parker Kincaid is spending time with his daughter and son and studying a letter that was supposedly written by late President Thomas Jefferson. It is when he is debating the authenticity of the letter that his ex-wife, Joan, comes and tells him that she wants the custody of their children. To Parker's dismay Joan's social worker will be at his house the next day.

Parker receives an unwanted call from Cage, an old friend, and Cage tells Parker that he needs Parker's help with a letter based on the subway shootings. Sensing this as a bad idea because of his children, Parker declines. After some time pondering about the shooting and all the innocent children that had died, he assures his son Robby that 'the Boatman' (a suspect from Parker's past case that tried to break in through Robby's window) won't show up, Parker shows up at Lukas's investigation site.

Parker studies the letter and concludes that although the writer seems dumb or foreign by the mistakes he makes, it is deliberate and the extortionist is actually intellectual. He also makes note of a strange stroke done over the letter 'i' which he dubs the 'Devil's Teardrop'.

In scans conducted by Hardy and Parker there is an imprint on the letter caused by being under another piece of paper. The imprint is suffixed with '-tel', which the team concludes that the second attack site must be a hotel.
