= The Chopin Manuscript =

Book by 15 thriller writers

First edition

The Chopin Manuscript is a collaboration by 15 thriller writers created by Jeffery Deaver. It is a 17-part serial thriller narrated by Alfred Molina that was originally broadcast weekly on Audible.com from 25 September 2007 to 13 November 2007. It is now available in other formats than audiobook.

The book was followed by a sequel called The Copper Bracelet in 2009.

== Authors ==
Listed in chapter order:

- Jeffery Deaver (wrote both first and last chapters)
- David Hewson
- James Grady
- S. J. Rozan
- Erica Spindler
- John Ramsey Miller
- David Corbett
- John Gilstrap
- Joseph Finder
- Jim Fusilli
- Peter Spiegelman
- Ralph Pezzullo
- Lisa Scottoline
- P. J. Parrish
- Lee Child

== Awards ==
- 2008 "Audie Award" for Audiobook of the Year — Audio Publishers Association
