= Death of a Blue Movie Star =

1990 novel by Jeffery Deaver

- First edition
- Author: Jeffery Deaver
- Language: English
- Series: Rune Trilogy
- Genre: Crime
- Publisher: Bantam Books
- Publication date: 1990
- Media type: Print (Hardback & Paperback)
- Pages: 288
- ISBN: 0-553-28547-5
- OCLC: 52962272
- Preceded by: Manhattan Is My Beat
- Followed by: Hard News

Death of a Blue Movie Star is a crime novel by American writer Jeffery Deaver. First published in 1990, it is the second book in the Rune Trilogy.

== Synopsis ==
Rune, now working as an underpaid production assistant while pursuing a career as an independent film-maker, finds herself facing danger again as she starts work on her first film project. She seems to have found the perfect subject following the bombing of an adult movie theatre, seen through the ideas of Shelly Lowe, the porn star whose film was playing when the bomb went off. However, just hours after Rune does her first sit-down interview with her, a second bomb claims Shellys life and Rune starts to wonder she was the intended target all along. Rune's debut may also be her last, as she comes up against someone who wants to bury her film -and the truth- forever.

== Critical reception ==
According to Publishers Weekly: "Deaver [...] writes compellingly about New York's sordid side, but his portrayal of Shelly as a gifted actress and aspiring playwright is hard to credit. Still, his fast-paced whodunit is saved by surprising twists near the end."
