= Carte Blanche (novel) =

Novel by Jeffery Deaver

- First edition cover
- Author: Jeffery Deaver
- Language: English
- Series: James Bond
- Genre: Spy novel
- Publisher: Hodder & Stoughton
- Publication date: 26 May 2011
- Publication place: United Kingdom
- Media type: Print (Hardcover)

Carte Blanche is a James Bond novel written by Jeffery Deaver. Commissioned by Ian Fleming Publications, it was published in the United Kingdom by Hodder & Stoughton on 26 May 2011 and was released in the United States by Simon & Schuster on 14 June 2011. Carte Blanche is the thirty-seventh original James Bond novel and the first to have a contemporary setting since The Man with the Red Tattoo by Raymond Benson was published in 2002. The title and cover artwork were unveiled on 17 January 2011, at a special launch event at the InterContinental Hotel in Dubai.

== Background ==
Carte Blanche updates James Bond's backstory to fit with the 21st century setting. Jeffery Deaver has stated that his James Bond would have been born in 1979, making him a veteran of the war in Afghanistan (Operation Herrick) instead of a World War II veteran and Cold War secret agent as originally conceived by creator Ian Fleming.

== Plot ==
Set in mid-2011, the story takes place over the course of a week. James Bond is a former Royal Naval Reserve officer who has recently joined the Overseas Development Group – a covert operational unit of British security under the control of the Foreign and Commonwealth Office tasked "to identify and eliminate threats to the country by extraordinary means." Bond is employed within the 00 Section of the Operations Branch.

He starts his assignment on the outskirts of Novi Sad in Serbia where an Irish sapper-turned-enforcer named Niall Dunne is planning to derail a train carrying 300 kilograms of methyl isocyanate, dumping it into the Danube. Bond is able to prevent the catastrophe by derailing the train himself at a much safer place along the line. He is unable to detain Dunne, who kills Bond's Serbian contacts in the course of his escape.

Using what little intelligence Bond was able to gather from the operation in Serbia, the ODG is able to establish a connection to Green Way International, a waste disposal consortium contracted to demolish an army base in March. Because Bond is not authorized to act on British soil, he is forced to work with a domestic security agent named Percy Osborne-Smith. The two men clash over the interpretation of the intelligence, prompting Bond to manipulate Osborne-Smith into pursuing a lead Bond knows to be false, and allowing him to investigate the March army base on his own. While exploring the base hospital, he is sealed inside by Niall Dunne, who intends to kill him by bringing the hospital down in a controlled demolition. Bond escapes by improvising an explosive device.

Bond turns his attention to Green Way International, led by the enigmatic Severan Hydt. The Dutch-born Hydt is a "rag-and-bone man", who made his fortune in the disposal of waste. He has an intense fascination with death, which is strongly implied to be a sexual fetish. The Overseas Development Group authorize Bond to investigate Hydt when intelligence surfaces suggesting he is also known as 'Noah' and a key player in the derailment in Serbia, which is believed to be a prelude to a much bigger attack that will affect British interests. Bond gets wind of a second attack, to occur later in the week, killing up to one hundred people. He tracks Hydt to Dubai and, with the help of CIA officer Felix Leiter, eavesdrops on a conversation with one of Hydt's senior researchers. Concerned that the attack is imminent, Bond attempts to anticipate Hydt's next move and is on the verge of evacuating a crowded museum when he realises that Hydt is there for an exhibit of the bodies of 90 tribal nomads who were killed a millennium ago. Aborting his planned evacuation, Bond returns to Hydt's facility to find that Leiter has been attacked by an unknown assailant and a local CIA asset has been murdered.

Hydt leaves Dubai for Cape Town, with Bond following closely. Once inside South Africa, he meets Bheka Jordaan, a local police operative. Bond is able to get close to Hydt by posing as a Durban-based mercenary, and fuels Hydt's fixation with death by promising him access to mass graves across the African continent. Hydt is taken by Bond's proposal of exhuming the bodies and recycling them into consumer products such as building materials, and gradually welcomes him into his inner circle. Bond attends a fundraiser for the International Organization Against Hunger with Hydt, where he meets Felicity Willing, the charity's spokesperson. After helping Willing deliver the left-over food from the fundraiser to a distribution centre, the two become lovers.

Using his cover, Bond is able to infiltrate Hydt's operations in South Africa. His relationship with Bheka Jordaan sours, particularly when he encounters the assailant who attacked Leiter in Dubai: the brother of one of his contacts who was killed in Serbia. As the deadline for the attack – known as Gehenna (derived from the Hebrew word for Hell) – approaches, the Overseas Development Group is ordered to pull Bond out of South Africa and send him to Afghanistan as Whitehall believes the attack will happen there as they can see no connection between Hydt and Gehenna. M is not convinced and manages to keep Bond in South Africa, but the future of the agency depends on his being correct in suspecting Hydt.

On the day of the Gehenna attacks, Bond deduces that the target is somewhere in York, but his report is ignored by Osborne-Smith, who believes it is aimed at a security conference in London. Bond manages to access Hydt's research and development facility, where he uncovers plans for a weapon developed by Serbia known as "the Cutter", which fires razor-sharp shards of titanium at hypervelocity. Hydt has been using his operations to steal sensitive information, from which he has acquired the blueprints to the Cutter. Bond realised that the derailment in Serbia was a false flag operation: its intention was not to drop methyl isocyanate into the Danube, but to allow Niall Dunne the opportunity to steal scrap metal from the train for use in the prototype Cutter. Hydt was employed by an American pharmaceutical corporation to detonate a Cutter at a university in York, killing a cancer researcher on the verge of a breakthrough that would bankrupt the pharmaceutical corporation. Misinformation fed to a Hungarian newspaper would suggest the attack was aimed at a fellow lecturer who was a vocal opponent of the Serbian government. With the help of Hydt's personal assistant, Bond is able to stop the attack. Hydt is arrested, but Dunne escapes and shoots his employer at long range.

Bond is uncomfortable with the conclusion, feeling that there are too many loose ends at hand. Research shows that the ODG had been misled, and their intelligence misinterpreted; Severan Hydt was never known as Noah. Rather, it is an acronym for the National Organisation Against Hunger, which recently expanded to provide food aid on an international scale. Niall Dunne is an associate of Felicity Willing, whose organisation has expanded to the point where she directly controls one-third of all food aid arriving in Africa. She intends to use this power to strategically distribute food throughout east Africa, giving the Sudanese government a pretext to go to war with rebels and prevent Southern Sudan from seceding. She set Dunne up in Hydt's organization so he could help her put the authorities on his trail, providing the distraction she needed to put her plan into action. Bond lures Willing into a trap at an abandoned inn where she confesses the plot. Niall Dunne re-appears, attacking the party before Bond and Bheka Jordaan shoot and kill him. Willing is taken to a black site after MI6 spread stories suggesting she was embezzling from her own charity.

A subplot throughout the novel involves Bond's investigations into a KGB operation code-named "Steel Cartridge". Bond believes that his father was a spy for the United Kingdom during the Cold War, and that he was killed by Russian agents. Further evidence suggests that Steel Cartridge was a clean-up operation, with the Russians assassinating their own agents who had infiltrated Western intelligence organisations. The suggestion that his father was a traitor does not sit well with Bond, until he unearths further evidence that shows the Russians carried out a Steel Cartridge assassination on a Western spy-hunter who was dangerously close to identifying Soviet moles – his mother, Monique Delacroix Bond.

== Characters ==
Carte Blanche features several recurring characters from the Fleming novels, however, they all have updated backstories in order to fit in with the contemporary setting:

- James Bond: Born in 1979, Bond is a veteran of the wars in Afghanistan (Operation Herrick). He drives a Bentley Continental GT, a brand Fleming used throughout his novels. Unlike the Fleming character (and despite the book's smoke design motif), James Bond is a former smoker.
- M: The head of the Overseas Development Group returned to being a man after being a woman (Barbara Mawdsley) throughout Raymond Benson's tenure. He is referred to as "Miles" by two intelligence officers, implying that he is Miles Messervy, as Fleming identified M in his novels.
- Severan Hydt: The Dutch-born owner of Green Way International, a waste disposal corporation. He has an obsession with death that borders on sexual fetishisation, and plans to detonate a dangerous weapon in a British university to kill a cancer researcher.
- Niall Dunne: A former Army sapper turned enforcer who serves as Hydt's trusted confidant and the brains behind his plan. From Belfast, he has a fascination with machines, and tends to view the world in a cool, dispassionate manner.
- Felicity Willing: The spokeswoman for the International Organisation Against Hunger, which controls one-third of all food aid arriving in Africa. Willing attempts to use her position to distribute food in a way that would give the Sudanese government a pretext to go to war with rebels in the south.
- Bheka Jordaan: A member of the South African Police Service and an ally of Bond's. She is aware of the nature of his work and refuses to take part in it unless Bond can give her a legal reason to intervene. Her stubborn insistence on obeying protocol stems from a high-profile investigation she conducted into corruption in the South African police forces.
- Jessica Barnes: Hydt head of PR and Advertising. Also his lover, an older woman, he has a fascination with her ageing.
- Miss Moneypenny: M's personal secretary is in her mid-30s.
- Ophelia "Philly" Maidenstone: MI6's liaison officer to the Overseas Development Group. Bond finds her invaluable, particularly for her ability to piece together intelligence. He finds they share many common interests, and considers pursuing a relationship with her, once he has allowed her time to recover from a broken engagement.
- Gregory Lamb: An MI6 officer stationed in Cape Town, but with jurisdiction over the entire African continent. Many in London consider him dangerous and unbridled and advise that he should be avoided if possible. Lamb ingratiates himself into Bond's operation, and Bond surmises that he is less dangerous than he is cowardly.
- Percy Osborne-Smith: An agent with Division Three, an offshoot of MI5. Osborne-Smith likes to be the one leading investigations so that he may take the credit for a successful operation. His ambitions lead him to shut down central London at the height of a security conference, ignoring intelligence from Bond that suggests the attack will take place in York.
- Felix Leiter: Bond's CIA counterpart and ally who aids him in tracking Severan Hydt in Dubai.
- Nicholas Rathko: A Serbian operative and former member of Arkan's Tigers with a vendetta against Bond. His younger brother was assisting Bond in Serbia before being captured and tortured by Niall Dunne. Rathko wants revenge against Bond for leaving his brother to die while chasing Dunne rather than taking him to a hospital.
- Sanu Hirani: The head of the Overseas Development Group's Q Branch. He is able to rapidly improvise and modify field equipment for Bond (at the drop of a hat) and claims he does not need to sleep. His office is described as being plastered with pictures of Indian cricketers. The novel refers to this character as "Q" at least once, implying that in Deaver's continuity Major Boothroyd (the Q of Fleming's Bond) is not the quartermaster of Q Branch. This is the only case of an ongoing Fleming character being replaced by Deaver.
- Mary Goodnight: The secretary to the 00 Section will be 21 years old. Goodnight has not been featured in a Bond novel since Fleming's The Man with the Golden Gun (1965); she had references in several previous Fleming novels. In the book, Deaver indicates that Goodnight resembles actress Kate Winslet.
- May Maxwell: Bond's loyal and elderly Scottish housekeeper. Initial reports suggested she would be re-imagined as Indian or Pakistani maidservant, but this change was later applied to Sanu Hirani, the head of Q Branch. The last name "Maxwell" is newly established, as Fleming never assigned a last name to the character.

== Launch event ==
As many details as possible regarding James Bond's adventures in Carte Blanche were kept under wraps by Ian Fleming Publications. The buzz generated around the book culminated in an invite-only event at St. Pancras Station in London on 25 May 2011. Here Deaver made his grand entrance in a Carte Blanche labelled Bentley, accompanied by stunt woman, model and actress Chesca Miles. Royal Marine Commandos abseiled from the roof of the elaborate station to hand Deaver a copy of the novel as he unveiled the book to the world's press.

== See also ==
- Outline of James Bond
