= Michael Grant (crime writer) =

American author (born 1940)

- Born: December 21, 1940 (age 85); New York City, New York
- Occupations: Writer, police officer, former security director
- Writing career
- Genre: Fiction
- Website: www.smashwords.com/profile/view/mggrant

Michael Grant (born December 21, 1940) is an American author. He is a 23-year veteran of the NYPD and a former security director.

== Bibliography ==
- Line of Duty (1992)
- Officer Down (1994)
- Retribution (1996)
- The Cove (2011)
- Back To Venice (2011)
- When I Come Home (2011)
- Dear Son, Hey Ma (2011)
- In The Time Of Famine (2011)
- Krystal (2011)
- Precinct (2012)
- Who Moved My Friggin' Provolone? (2011)
- Appropriate Sanctions (2011)
- Stalker (2011)
- A Letter To Ballyturan (2014)
