= Helen Engelhardt =

Helen Engelhardt is an activist, author, poet, storyteller and independent audio artist;

== Activities ==
She has been active in peace, justice and environmental causes for over thirty years. She is a supporter of gay marriage and donated $500 in 2008 to help defeat Proposition 8 in California, a gay marriage ban. She is involved with A Better Choice For New York and was a signatory of a 2010 open letter to Governor David Paterson and members of the New York State Legislature in which she supports a 1–3% tax increase for the wealthy in New York state to help avoid cuts in state services.

Engelhardt is the widow of Tony Hawkins, one of the 259 victims aboard Pan Am Flight 103 which exploded on Wednesday, 21 December 1988 over Lockerbie, Scotland when a bomb was detonated. She attracted public notice shortly after the bombing and again after the 2001 verdict announcements in the trial of Lameen Khalifa Fhima (who was acquitted) and Abdelbaset al-Megrahi (who was found guilty). She spoke out against Libyan leader Muammar al-Gaddafi during his visit to New York City on 23 September 2009 to give his speech to the United Nations General Assembly. She spoke against BP during a 19 July 2010 news conference at Syracuse University in New York where families and lawmakers including Senator Charles E. Schumer urged a federal probe of any BP role in the release of Abdelbaset al-Megrahi.

As an educator and writer, she is involved in building better relationships between peoples of different backgrounds in Brooklyn, New York, where she currently resides . sheShe sings alto with the Brooklyn Jewish Community Chorus and is a Brooklyn Dialogue Circle participant serving on the board of directors. She has been performing original and traditional stories before audiences since 1997 and took first prize in the storytelling competition at the Hemingway Days Festival, Key West, Florida in 1998.

== Published works ==
- Mothers And Sons – a double portrait of the German sculptor Käthe Kollwitz (1867–1945), who created "The Grieving Parents," a memorial to her son who died in World War I, and the contemporary German-American sculptor Suse Lowenstein, who created a work to honor her son, a victim in the 1988 Lockerbie disaster. Written by Marjorie Van Halteren & Helen Engelhardt – Produced in 2008 by Entre Deux Amies
- "Chicken soup for the soul": stories for a better world – The Last Day of My Life – Short Story.
- The Longest Night – A Personal History of Pan Am 103 – Audiobook of the Memoirs of Helen Engelhardt – Midsummer Sound Company.
- Incident at Altitude – Poem.
