= The Cold Moon =

2006 novel by Jeffery Deaver

- First edition cover
- Author: Jeffery Deaver
- Language: English
- Series: Lincoln Rhyme series
- Genre: Crime, thriller
- Publisher: Simon & Schuster
- Publication date: May 2006
- Publication place: United States
- Media type: Print (hardback & paperback)
- Pages: 406
- ISBN: 0-7432-6093-7
- OCLC: 64594472
- Dewey Decimal: 813/.6 22
- LC Class: PS3554.E1755 B76 2006
- Preceded by: The Twelfth Card
- Followed by: The Broken Window

The Cold Moon is a crime thriller novel by American writer Jeffery Deaver. It is the seventh book in the Lincoln Rhyme series, and also introduces CBI agent Kathryn Dance, who would get her own series of books.

== Plot ==
It is the night of the full Cold Moon—the month of December according to the lunar calendar. A young man is found dead in lower Manhattan, the first in a series of victims of a man calling himself the Watchmaker. This killer's obsession with time drives him to plan the murders with the precision of fine timepieces, and the victims die prolonged deaths while an eerie clock ticks away their last minutes on earth. Lincoln Rhyme, Amelia Sachs, and the rest of the crew are tapped to handle the case and stop the Watchmaker and his partner, Vincent Reynolds, a repulsive character with a special interest in the female victims of the killer. Amelia is not only Lincoln's eyes and ears at crime scenes on the Watchmaker case, but she is now running her own homicide investigation—her first case as lead detective. The policewoman's unwavering efforts in pursuing the killers of a businessman, who left behind a wife and son, sets into motion clockwork gears of its own, with consequences reaching to people and events that will endanger not only many lives but Lincoln's and Amelia's future together.

== Reception ==
Publishers Weekly reviewed the book saying "Deaver fans won't be surprised that the investigations overlap, or that the several apparent climaxes are building to something more, but even they will be hard-pressed to peel back all the layers of the cunning plot at work beneath the surface."

Joe Hartlaub of BookReporter.com reviewed the book, saying "As always, Deaver educates as well as entertains, and within the novel's pages he drops small but fascinating nuggets regarding time and clocks. If you don't know why we say 'speed up' or 'slow down,' you will after reading THE COLD MOON. You will also have the pleasure of reading what is not only Deaver's best work to date but also one of the best books of the year thus far".
