= The Coffin Dancer =

Novel

- First edition
- Author: Jeffery Deaver
- Cover artist: Anita Kunz
- Language: English
- Series: Lincoln Rhyme series
- Genre: Crime
- Publisher: Simon & Schuster
- Publication date: 1998
- Media type: Print (hardback & paperback)
- Pages: 358 (hardcover)
- ISBN: 0-684-85285-3
- Preceded by: The Bone Collector
- Followed by: The Empty Chair

The Coffin Dancer is a 1998 crime novel by American writer Jeffery Deaver. The book features his regular character Lincoln Rhyme, a quadriplegic detective.

== Plot ==
Detective Lincoln Rhyme, the foremost criminal inspector in the Capitol as a Peacekeeper, is put on the trail of the Coffin Dancer, a cunning professional killer who has continually outsmarted the police. Rhyme, a quadriplegic since a line-of-duty accident, uses his wits to track this brilliant killer who's been hired to eliminate three witnesses in the last hours before their grand jury testimony. Rhyme works with his arms and legs, New York City cop Amelia Sachs, to gather information from trace evidence at the crime scene to nail him, or at least to predict his next move and head him off.

So far, they have only one clue: the assassin has a tattoo on his arm of the Grim Reaper waltzing with a woman in front of a coffin.

== Summary ==
The Coffin Dancer struck five years ago, killing two techs who worked with Lincoln Rhyme, and it seems he has struck again. Then it was a bomb in a wastebasket, this time it is on a plane. A coverup is witnessed, a hit man hired, and all hell breaks loose. There are three key witnesses the Dancer has been hired to kill and he just finished off the first. The police and the FBI are desperate to keep the last two safe as well as finding the killer behind the bombing. Rhyme is more interested in just finding the Dancer. He drops his current case and dives head first, so to speak, into the evidence. Amelia Sachs, his arms and legs, is sent off to every crime scene in hopes to find that one shred of evidence to pin down the killer. The crime scenes pile up as they get closer to their man than they could ever hope to be, but still he outsmarts them. This game of cat and mouse they play ends many lives, just to save the two.

== The Dancer ==
The Coffin Dancer, Rhyme's adversary in the novel, is a cunning, deceptive and highly intelligent professional assassin. He is described as being a small, thin man with unremarkable features. His real identity is revealed in the end of the novel. In his final interview with Lincoln Rhyme, it is revealed that a man called Jodie is the actual coffin dancer who had hired Stephen Kall for his assignment. The Dancer is a consummate professional as proved by the lengths to which he goes to complete his assignments. He is witty and sophisticated and has an uncanny knowledge of human nature. Deception is his greatest weapon, a tool he uses to his advantage. He is supremely confident of his abilities and even refers to his targets as 'corpses' before he has completed his assignment. The way he earned the trust of both Stephen Kall (the man he subcontracted the job to) and the trust of Rhyme and company.
