= Kevin G. Chapman =

American author and attorney

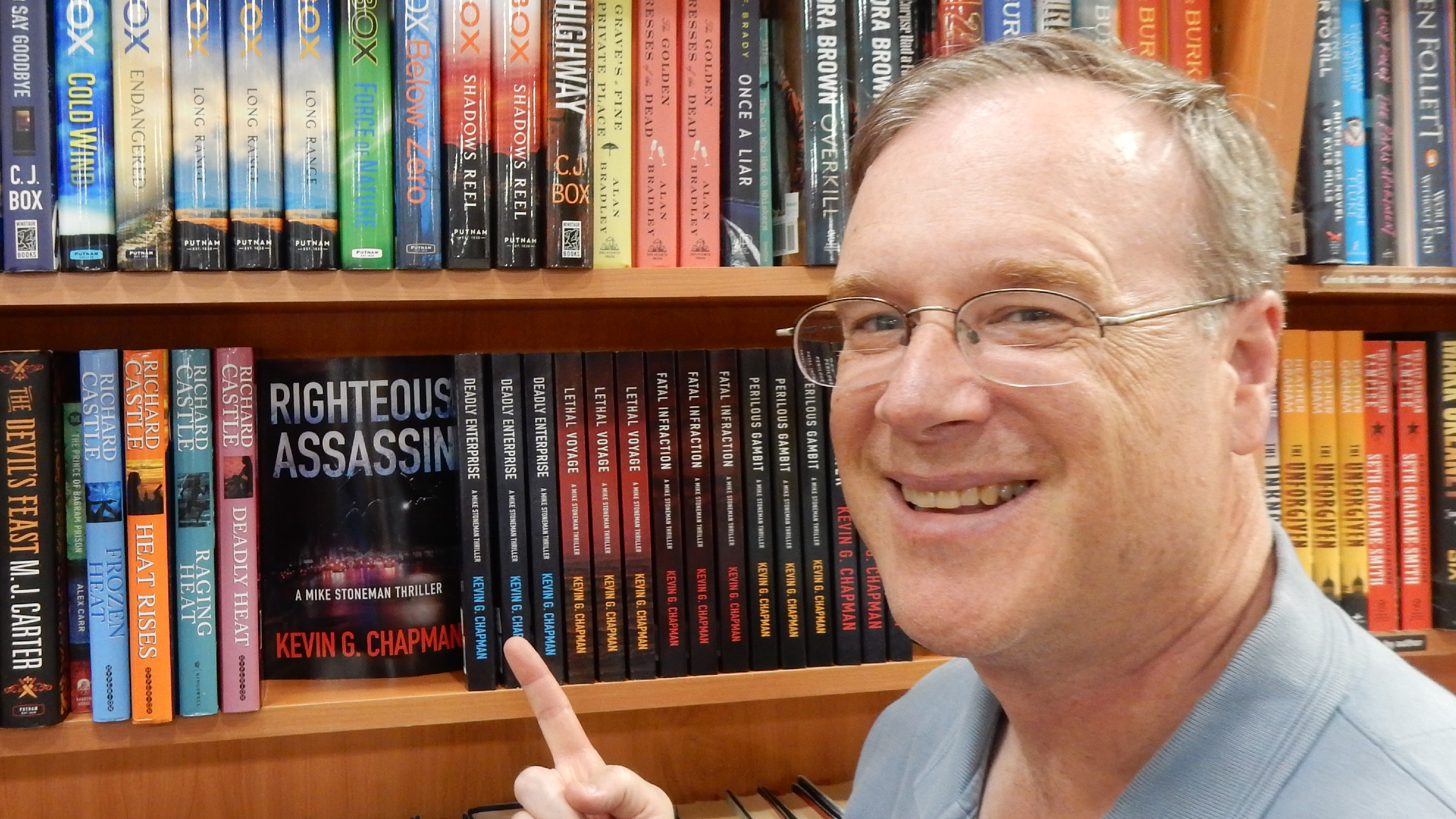
- Education: Columbia University (BA); Boston University (JD)
- Occupations: Author; attorney
- Writing career
- Genre: Detective fiction
- Website: kevingchapman.com

Kevin G. Chapman is an American author and a labor and employment law attorney. His series of novels focuses on Mike Stoneman, an NYPD Detective who grew out of a 2012 short story that Chapman wrote.

== Early life and education ==
Chapman was raised in Port Angeles, Washington and graduated from Columbia University with a Bachelor of Arts in English in 1983. He received his JD from Boston University in 1986.

== Career ==
After passing the bar, Chapman worked for Proskauer Rose, Kauff McClain & McGuire and Dow Jones & Company.

== Writing ==
Righteous Assassin and Deadly Enterprise reached number one on the Amazon best seller list. A follow-up title in the series, Lethal Voyage, set aboard a cruise to Bermuda, was named 2021's Best Mystery/Thriller by the Kindle Book Review and was a finalist for Chanticleer Book Review's CLUE Award InD'Tale Magazine's RONE award.

== Bibliography ==
=== Mike Stoneman Series ===
- Righteous Assassin, Book 1 (First Legacy Publishing; 2018)
- Deadly Enterprise, Book 2 (First Legacy Publishing; 2019)
- Lethal Voyage, Book 3 (First Legacy Publishing; 2020)
- Fatal Infraction, Book 4 (First Legacy Publishing; 2021)
- Perilous Gambit, Book 5 (First Legacy Publishing; 2021)
- Double Takedown, Book 6 (First Legacy Publishing; 2025)

=== Independent ===
- A Legacy of One (Published Independently; 2021)
- Dead Winner (First Legacy Publishing; 2022)
- The Other Murder (First Legacy Publishing; 2024)
