= The Twelfth Card =

2005 novel by Jeffery Deaver

- First edition
- Author: Jeffery Deaver
- Cover artist: Design by Rod Hernandez; Illustration by Marc Gerber
- Language: English
- Series: Lincoln Rhyme series
- Genre: Mystery, crime, thriller
- Publisher: Simon & Schuster
- Publication date: June 7, 2005
- Publication place: United States
- Media type: Print (hardback & paperback)
- Pages: 416 (paperback edition)
- ISBN: 0-7434-3781-0 (paperback edition)
- OCLC: 55981159
- Preceded by: The Vanished Man
- Followed by: The Cold Moon

The Twelfth Card is a crime novel by American writer Jeffery Deaver, the sixth in the series featuring Lincoln Rhyme. It was published in 2005.

== Plot summary ==
The story starts out in a museum where Geneva Settle, a high-school student in Harlem, is researching information for a paper about her ancestor, Charles Singleton. While she is looking at an old newspaper, Thompson Boyd, an unfeeling, professional killer, attempts to murder her. As his attempts continue, each time he leaves behind a clue which either helps or misleads Lincoln Rhyme. Amelia Sachs, Fred Dellray, Mel Cooper, and Lon Sellitto help Lincoln to solve why Boyd is after Settle. Rhyme believes initially that Geneva was the witness to a planned terrorist attack. It is eventually revealed that Boyd was hired to kill her because of her ancestor's secret. Singleton's secret was that he owned fifteen acres of prime land in Manhattan in the 1800s. Rhyme had discovered through the investigation of the crime that Geneva's ancestor was falsely accused of murder and had his land stolen. The person who bought the land ended up creating a huge company in the modern time. As the land was not legally sold, all of Singleton's relatives were legally entitled to compensation over the course of 200 years. The chase to catch Boyd and all of his accomplices continue throughout a two-day period. Throughout the story, there are also some other smaller story lines and this crime eventually leads to the solutions of other crimes. Some of the people in the novel are not who they appear to be. One of Boyd's accomplices pretends to be the guidance counselor at Settle's high school. Also, a common vandal and criminal turns out to be Settle's dad.

== Explanation of title ==
One of the clues that are left behind is the twelfth card, The Hanged Man, in the tarot card deck which signifies spiritual exploration.

== Receptions ==
The book overall got a good review. The book sold 300,000 books in the first printing and was ranked 24,467 in sales ranking. On the New York Times's best seller list it made it to number 6 on June 26, 2005.

From the website curledup.com, Wayne Adam says the novel is one of the best Lincoln Rhyme novels yet, describing it as a thriller with a rapid-pace, because of the characters Rhyme and Boyd being distinctive and the novel having a lot of plot twists and the ending has several shocking endings.

Gilbert Cruz, from Entertainment Weekly, related the CBS hit, CSI, to the novel in his review by saying that the procedures used to dissect a crime scene are the same, even though it is denied in the book. The use of out-of-date black slang was the only major flaw that Cruz found. Overall The Twelfth Card received a 'B' grade.
