= The Burning Wire =

2010 novel by Jeffery Deaver

- Author: Jeffery Deaver
- Language: English
- Series: Lincoln Rhyme Series
- Genre: Crime, thriller
- Publisher: Simon & Schuster
- Publication date: June 2010
- Publication place: United States
- Media type: Print (hardback & paperback)
- Pages: 432
- ISBN: 1-4391-5633-6
- Preceded by: The Broken Window

The Burning Wire is a crime thriller novel by American writer Jeffery Deaver, featuring the officially retired, quadriplegic criminalist Lincoln Rhyme. It is the ninth novel in the Lincoln Rhyme series.

== Plot ==
The sabotage of a substation of the prominent electrical energy distributor Algonquin Consolidated Power and Light Company in Queens, New York, causing a deadly arc flash leads to an investigation managed by esteemed criminalist Lincoln Rhyme and his team of investigators.

The initial primary suspect, Ray Galt, a disillusioned employee of Algonquin Consolidated, is believed to blame Algonquin and society's reliance on electricity for his leukemia, which he developed due to radiation from working close to power lines. Signals intelligence (SIGINT) suggests that Galt is backed by a previously unknown eco-terror group named "Justice For". The collected intelligence fails to specify further details of the terrorist cell, other than the name "Rahman".

A series of demand letters are sent after the first attack, ordering Algonquin to reduce its electrical distribution, or further acts of violence involving electricity would be executed.

Rhyme must also deal with a parallel investigation into a recurring antagonist in the series: the criminal Richard Logan, who is nicknamed "The Watchmaker". A joint operation is conducted between Rhyme's office and the Mexican Federal Police after Logan is located in Mexico.

In the end, it turns out that the culprit is Richard Logan, who was trying to frame Randall and the other woman for murders. Logan tries to kill Rhyme, but Rhyme predicts the attempt, and then preempts him, by cutting power of the panel. Logan is captured. However, New York is unlikely to execute him because of their hesitancy concerning the death penalty.

== Reception and awards ==
Alison Flood from The Observer criticised Deaver for burdening the flow of the story with electrical knowledge, stating that "the endless paragraphs explaining how the electricity grid works slow the plot down, throwing the reader out of the race to stop the villain...", as well as the lack of character development of Rhyme's partner, Amelia Sachs. Despite this, Flood wrote a generally positive review of The Burning Wire, specifically complimenting Deaver on his ability to deliver numerous plot twists near the conclusion of his novels.

The Burning Wire ranked at #24 on The New York Times Best Seller list for Hardcover Fiction in the July 4, 2010, publication.
