= John Ramsey Miller =

American author living in North Carolina (born 1949)

- Born: October 3, 1949 (age 76); Greenville, Mississippi, U.S.
- Occupation: Writer
- Spouse: Susan Dedmon
- Children: Christian McCarty Miller, Rush Lane Miller, Adam Ramsey Miller
- Writing career
- Genres: Thriller fiction, Mystery fiction, crime writer
- Website: johnramseymiller.com

John Ramsey Miller (born October 3, 1949) is an American author living in North Carolina.

He began his writing career as a journalist, including an exclusive interview with Martha Mitchell during the Watergate era. His interview with Mitchell appeared on The Dick Cavett Show when Miller was interviewed by Cavett.

As a commercial portrait photographer, Miller photographed notable recording artists for album covers for major labels and portraits of recording artists for illustrating music related magazine articles and for publicity purposes, including; Tennessee Ernie Ford and The Jordanaires, Bill Monroe, Bill Anderson, David Allan Coe, Amy Grant, Brenda Lee, Dion, B.J. Thomas, Dr. Hook, Don Williams, Eric Clapton, Waylon Jennings, Mel Tillis, Tammy Wynette, Earl Scruggs, Bill Gaither Trio, Eddie Rabbitt, Jerry Clower, Terry Bradshaw, Dottie West, Crystal Gayle, Dolly Parton, Carlene Carter, Ed Brown, Alex Chilton, Ronnie Milsap, Fury Lewis, B. B. King, Burt Reynolds, Robbie Benson, Jerry Reed, Chet Atkins, Les Paul, Porter Wagoner, Johnny Cash, Gary Stewart, Guy Clark, 2 Live Crew, Johnny Duncan, Tommy Overstreet, Dogwood, 2 Average White Kids

Additionally Miller produced a series of photos after setting up a 'studio' at Angola Prison Death Row.

Miller continued to deal with controversy with an account of the obscenity trials of 2 Live Crew. The book, As Nasty as They Wanna Be: The Uncensored Story of Luther Campbell of the 2 Live Crew, takes the wraps off the notorious rap group, revealing the people behind the bad-mouthed persona.

Switching genres to produce a popular thriller, The Last Family, Miller entered a relationship with Bantam Books that included the Winter Massey series from which Upside Down was nominated for an International Thriller Writers Award for best PBO (Paper Back Original) and Inside Out was nominated for a Barry Award for best PBO.

== Biography ==
Miller was born in Greenville, Mississippi. His father, Rush Glenn Miller, was a Methodist minister and his mother, Gene Ramsey Miller, was a history professor. He attended Delta State University in Cleveland, Mississippi where he studied art.

In 1972 he was working as a still photographer and graphic designer at an ABC TV network affiliate station in Mississippi when he accidentally became embroiled with Martha Mitchell and the burgeoning Watergate scandal. He was fired from his job for trying to help a friend protect Mrs. Mitchell from the press. Thanks to Helen Thomas, he conducted an exclusive filmed interview with Martha Mitchell, which aired on The Dick Cavett Show, August 9, 1973.

In 1981 Miller set up a studio in a narrow hallway of Death Row at Angola Prison and produced a series of formal portraits of the inmates. Over the next four years he set up a portable studio and produced formalized portraits of individuals associated with "groups". He photographed firemen, policemen, Klansmen in their robes, skinheads and Identity Christians as well as their children. He photographed artists, entertainers, prostitutes, doctors, lawyers, drug addicts and politicians. His portrait work has been shown in museums and included in several books and national magazines. The Death Row series was published in Oxford American, and his portraits of white supremacists in New Times and The Miami Herald's Sunday magazine, TROPIC.

In 1990, working with Luther Campbell, he wrote a non-fiction book on 2 Live Crew and the obscenity trials.

In 1994 Bantam Books bought his book, The Last Family. The book was a Literary Guild Main Selection, was published in twelve languages, was optioned by Hallmark Entertainment for a feature film, reached #16 on the New York Times Best Seller list, and is still in print.

Miller, working in a collaboration with 14 other noted writers, including friend Jeffery Deaver, wrote the 17-part serial thriller The Chopin Manuscript narrated by Alfred Molina that was broadcast on Audible.com from September 25 to November 13, 2007.

== Bibliography ==
=== Non-fiction ===
- As Nasty as They Wanna Be: The Uncensored Story of Luther Campbell of the 2 Live Crew (1992) (with Luther Campbell)
- Feature articles for Miami Herald's Tropic magazine (Covers and stories illustrated with photos by the author)
- My Friend the Nazi
- The Fifth Street Gym
- Busting With Pride
- Pawnography
- The Estimable Mr. Campbell

=== Fiction ===
- The Last Family Bantam (July 1, 1997) ISBN 978-0-553-57496-8
- Inside Out Dell (May 31, 2005) ISBN 978-0-553-58337-3
- Upside Down Dell (June 28, 2005) ISBN 978-0-553-58340-3
- Side by Side Dell (August 30, 2005) ISBN 978-0-553-58343-4
- Too Far Gone Dell (August 29, 2006) ISBN 978-0-440-24309-0
- Smoke and Mirrors Dell (March 25, 2008) ISBN 978-0-440-24310-6
- The Last Day Bantam (December 30, 2008) ISBN 978-0-440-24311-3
