= Joanna Bourke =

British historian and academic

Joanna Bourke OBE FBA
- Born: 1963 (age 62–63); Blenheim, New Zealand
- Awards: Ronald Tress Prize (1993); Fraenkel Prize in Contemporary History (1998); Wolfson History Prize (2000); Fellow of the British Academy (2014); Raleigh Lecture on History (2018)

Academic background
- Education: University of Auckland (BA, MA); Australian National University (PhD)
- Thesis: Husbandry to Housewifery: Rural Women and Development in Ireland, 1890–1914 (1989)

Academic work
- Institutions: Birkbeck, University of London; Emmanuel College, Cambridge; Australian National University
- Main interests: Social and cultural history Violence and emotions Modern warfare Gender
- Notable works: An Intimate History of Killing (1999)
- Website: www.bbk.ac.uk/history/our-staff/academic-staff/joanna

Joanna Bourke OBE FBA (born 1963) is a British historian and academic. She is professor of history at Birkbeck, University of London.

== Biography ==
Born to Christian medical-missionary parents, Bourke was brought up in New Zealand, Zambia, Solomon Islands and Haiti. She attended the University of Auckland, gaining Bachelor of Arts and Master of Arts degrees in History. She undertook her Doctor of Philosophy degree at the Australian National University (ANU) and subsequently held academic posts at the ANU, Emmanuel College, Cambridge, and Birkbeck, University of London. Her primary affiliation is with Birkbeck, University of London, but she is also Professor of Rhetoric at Gresham College, London, and the Global Innovation Chair in the Centre for the Study of Violence at the University of Newcastle, Australia. She has joint British and New Zealand citizenship.

Bourke, who describes herself as a "socialist feminist", has published 15 books and over 120 articles in academic journals or edited collections. Her books include ones on British, Irish, American, Australia, New Zealand, and Haitian history from the late eighteenth century to the present. They focus on topics such as women's history, gender, working-class culture, war and masculinity, the cultural history of fear, the history of rape, war art, pain, militarisation, the history of what it means to be human, animal-human relations, and the history of Higher Education. Her books have been translated into Chinese, Russian, Korean, Spanish, Catalan, Italian, Portuguese, Czech, Turkish, and Greek. An Intimate History of Killing won the Wolfson Prize and the Fraenkel Prize. It was in the final shortlist for the W. H. Smith Literary Prize.

Bourke is a frequent contributor to television and radio, a blogger and tweeter, and a regular correspondent for newspapers and popular journals. Her 40-CD audio history of Britain, entitled "Eyewitness", won Gold for Best Audio Production for Volume 1910–19, Gold for Best Audio Production for Volume 1940–49, and Gold for the Most Original Audio for all 10 volumes.

Bourke lives in London. In 2014, she was elected a Fellow of the British Academy, the United Kingdom's national academy for the humanities and social sciences. She was the Principal Investigator for a Wellcome Trust project called SHaME, or Sexual Harms and Medical Encounters, which explored the medical and psychiatric aspects of sexual violence. The project aimed to move beyond shame to address this global health crisis. SHaME spanned both historical and contemporary, regional and global perspectives. As part of this project Bourke published a global history of sexual violence. She is the recent author of Five Evil Women: Hindley, West, Wuornos, Homolka, Tucker (Reaktion Books 2026), which is a non-sensationalist history of five women who have been called 'icons of evil'. She asks: what do we mean when we call someone 'evil'? How else might we understand their acts of extreme cruelty? What should we 'do' with such women?

Bourke is currently writing an autoethnographic book on 'Women and Wine', an exploration of female cultures of drinking in the twentieth century, focusing on the countries in which she has lived, that is, Haiti, New Zealand, Australia, the U.S., the U.K., and Greece.

== Selected works ==
- Husbandry and Housewifery: Women, Economic Change and Housework in Ireland, 1890–1914, Oxford University Press, 1993 ISBN 0198203853
- Working-Class Cultures in Britain, 1890–1960: Gender, Class and Ethnicity, Routledge, 1994 ISBN 0415098971
- Dismembering the Male: Men's Bodies, Britain and the Great War, Reaktion Press and University of Chicago Press, 1996 ISBN 9781861890351
- An Intimate History of Killing: Face-to-Face Killing in Twentieth Century Warfare, Granta, 1999, (Won the Fraenkel Prize in Contemporary History for 1998 and the Wolfson Prize for Historical Writing in 2000) ISBN 0465007384
- Eyewitness, Authentic Voices of the 20th Century, BBC Audiobooks, 2004
- Fear: A Cultural History, Virago, 2006 (published by Shoemaker and Hoard in the US; shortlisted for Mind Book of the Year Award 2006 (UK)) ISBN 1844081567
- Rape: A History from the 1860s to the Present, Virago, 2007 (published in the US as Rape: Sex, Violence, History, Shoemaker & Hoard, 2007) ISBN 9781593761141
- What It Means To Be Human. Historical Reflections 1790 to the Present, Virago, 2011 (published by Counterpoint in the US) ISBN 9781844086450
- The Story of Pain: From Prayer to Painkillers, Oxford University Press, 2014 ISBN 9780199689439
- Wounding the World: How Military Violence and War-Play Invade our Lives, Virago, 2014 (published in the US as Deep Violence: Military Violence, War Play, and the Social Life of Weapons, Counterpoint, 2015) ISBN 9780349004341
- War and Art: A Visual History of Modern Conflict, Reaktion Books, 2017 ISBN 9781780238463
- Loving Animals: On Bestiality, Zoophilia and Post-Human Love, TJ Books, 2020 ISBN 978-1789143102
- Disgrace: Global Reflections on Sexual Violence, Reaktion Books ISBN 9781789145991
- Birkbeck: 200 Years of Radical Learning for Working People, Oxford University Press, 2022 ISBN 9780192846631
- Five Evil Women: Hindley, West, Wuornos, Homolka, Tucker, Reaktion Books, 2026 ISBN 978-1-83639-174-6
