= Dale Harris =

English composer and guitarist

Dale Harris (born 1968 in West London) is an English classical guitarist, multi-genre guitar-instrumentalist and composer. Harris has produced several albums, Espiritu De La Guitarra (2006), Dark Tales (with Jez Henderson in 2007), Reverie on a Hill in 2008, The Music of Dale Harris: A Case of the Spanish Guitar in 2013 and Idyll: European Guitar Music in 2017. From 1994 to 1996, he was the backing guitarist with country music singer Lorne Gibson. In 2004, Harris published Cryptograms in the Music of Alban Berg. He teaches guitar and is director of Cryptogram Records Ltd.

== Biography ==
Dale Harris was born in 1968 in West London, England. Harris was taught the guitar by his father at the age of four years and was seven when he first performed in public in Southern Spain.

Harris has performed in Europe, South Africa, performing as a soloist, with ensembles, with an orchestra and as an accompanist. He holds a First Class Honours degree in music; a Master of Arts degree With Distinction from the University of Canterbury, Kent where he studied with guitar teacher John Mills; and a PhD in Musicology from Kent University under the supervision of composer Roderick Watkins and the Alban Berg scholar and author Douglas Jarman. In 2002, Harris composed the music for a promotional film commissioned by the BP corporation. Since 2005, Harris has continually toured western Europe. In 2008, he became a CD reviewer for The Lute Society (UK). Harris' work, both live and in recordings have been played on the BBC, Independent radio and Television and many Internet-based media outlets. Harris continues to be based in West London where he performs and teaches guitar and he is currently transcribing the classic chamber and orchestral works for solo guitar.

== Discography ==
Espiritu De La Guitarra, (Cryptogram Records, 2006).

Dark Tales, Dale Harris & Jez Henderson (Cryptogram Records, 2007).

Reverie on a Hill (Cryptogram Records, 2008).

The Music of Dale Harris: A Case of the Spanish Guitar (Cryptogram, 2013).

Idyll: European Guitar Music (Cryptogram, 2017).

From The Vaults (Volume 1): Is There Life on Mars? (Dale Harris, 2013).

From The Vaults (Volume 2): Nowhere To Hide Here in the West (Dale Harris, 2013).

From The Vaults (Volume 3): Beyond Classical (Dale Harris, 2013).

== Bibliography ==
Cryptograms in the Music of Alban Berg, Harris, D. G. (2004), PhD Thesis, Canterbury University, Kent, UK.
