= The Stone Monkey =

2002 novel by Jeffery Deaver

- First edition
- Author: Jeffery Deaver
- Language: English
- Series: Lincoln Rhyme series
- Genre: Crime
- Publisher: Simon & Schuster
- Publication date: 2002
- Media type: Print (hardback & paperback)
- Pages: 432
- ISBN: 978-0-7432-2199-3
- OCLC: 59363971
- Preceded by: The Empty Chair
- Followed by: The Vanished Man

The Stone Monkey is a crime novel by American writer Jeffery Deaver. First published in 2002, it is the fourth Deaver novel featuring the quadraplegic detective Lincoln Rhyme.

== Plot summary ==
As the US Coast Guard moves to intercept a ship off the coast of New York, which had departed from St Petersburg carrying around 30 Chinese illegal immigrants, the leader of the ship, a notorious human smuggler and hitman named Ghost, decides to ignite a bomb, causing the ship to sink, as he escapes himself by means of a life-raft.

A group of immigrants escape on a second life-raft, some of whom fall over within meters from the shore. One of them drowns, two are pursued and killed by Ghost, and a shot is fired by Ghost against another. The remaining ten, namely, the Chang and Wu families, who were dissidents and supporters of the 1989 riots in China, run into Chinatown of New York using a stolen van. Ghost meets with a local accomplice, but he drives off by himself, abandoning Ghost.

Amelia Sachs, upon racing to the scene, finds a man with a gun-shot wound clinging to the rocks near the shore, and helps to rescue him. The man claims to be Dr John Sung, a well-known dissident and supporter of democracy. After being taken to the hospital, he requests asylum and is easily granted release pending the hearing.

At Lincoln Rhyme's apartment, where the interagency operation to intercept the ship was being coordinated, the team is approached by Sonny Li, one of the immigrants who fell off the raft, who is really an undercover police officer from Fuzhou, and who wishes to kill Ghost for personal reasons. Meanwhile, the Chang family is sheltered by a contact in Brooklyn, while the Wu family pays a Chinatown gang for protection.

Ghost goes to the Uighur Community Center and hires three accomplices of the Uighur race to murder his unfaithful accomplice, as well as the leader of the aforementioned Chinatown gang. He tries to assault the apartment of the Wu family, but is ambushed by the FBI, INS, and NYPD. As it happens, the mother of Wu was sick with a disease common to China, and was intercepted at the hospital by Rhyme, who proceeded to arranged the ambush. However, an INS agent with a personal vendetta against Ghost fires too soon, alerting Ghost and allowing him escape, even though one accomplice is killed.

The father of Chang decides to meet with Ghost, pretending to be a Sino-American wanting to sell Chang out, so he can kill Ghost. However, the grandfather drugs him with morphine and goes to the meeting instead, and proceeds to shoot at Ghost. He kills one accomplice but runs out of ammunition, and kills himself by drinking morphine before Ghost can torture him. Li conducts his own investigation, leading him to an upper-class Fengshui dealer whom Ghost had hired.

He is told that Ghost had just exited the office. He confronts Ghost in the street, discovering that he had shot himself, clung to a rock near the shore, and assumed the identity of Dr John Sung. The two of them fight, and Li is ultimately killed, but not before rubbing talcum-powder from Ghost's amulet under his nails, so that Rhyme can trace the material to Dr John Sung.

Rhyme locates the Chang family's hide-out, and deploys the combined task force. Sachs, who during this period has befriended Dr John Sung, brings him along as a translator. Unknown to her, they are tailed by two Uighur accomplices. Rhyme calls Sachs after finding the talcum-powder residue, and warns her. Sachs decides to pretend to arrest a random INS agent to distract Ghost, and drives not to the Chang apartment, but to another house where NYPD paramilitary can ambush Ghost and the two accomplices.

However, Ghost, using his connections within the INS, is able to secure deportation to China despite his numerous murders and other crimes on American soil. There, he has arranged for his Chinese connections to abandon any criminal prosecution. The team is stunned and disappointed. However, rhyme at this point realizes that Ghost is not merely a criminal, but an agent of the Chinese government, specifically of the province of Fujian since the central government cannot get their hands unclean. Ghost's mission is not to smuggle humans, but to offer to smuggle intellectual dissidents at a very low cost, and then to kill them by detonating the ship. Rhyme realizes that the State Department secretly knows this, and is returning Ghost to appease China.

In one final move, Rhyme, with the help of the NYPD and The New York Times, argues with Ghost and the State Department at the boarding gate of the air-plane, and threatens to create a scandal if Ghost is not further detained. The State Department gives in, and several INS and State Department employees are forced into early retirement. Ghost is scheduled for trial, and is likely to face the death penalty, or life imprisonment at the very least. The Chang and Wu families proceed with their asylum hearings which are implied to have succeeded.
