= The Broken Window =

2008 crime thriller by Jeffery Deaver

- First edition cover
- Author: Jeffery Deaver
- Language: English
- Series: Lincoln Rhyme series
- Genre: Crime, thriller
- Publisher: Simon & Schuster
- Publication date: June 2008
- Publication place: United States
- Media type: Print (hardback & paperback)
- Pages: 432
- ISBN: 978-1-4165-4997-0
- OCLC: 182662727
- Dewey Decimal: 813/.54 22
- LC Class: PS3554.E1755 B76 2008
- Preceded by: The Cold Moon
- Followed by: The Burning Wire

The Broken Window is a crime thriller novel by American writer Jeffery Deaver, published in 2008. It is the eighth book in the Lincoln Rhyme series.

== Plot ==
In the book, a killer has access to the world's greatest data miner called Strategic Systems Datacorp. He is using detailed information to commit crimes and blame them on innocents. Lincoln Rhyme, Amelia Sachs, and other familiar characters from the previous books join forces to bring the criminal to justice.

== Reception ==
- Publishers Weekly reviewed the book saying "The topical subject matter makes the story line particularly compelling, while longtime fans will relish Deaver's intimate exploration of a tragedy from Rhyme's adolescence."
- Entertainment Weekly reviewed the book saying "Quadriplegic forensics whiz Lincoln Rhyme and his Glock-toting girlfriend, Amelia Sachs, track a serial killer who uses an all-knowing computer database to frame fall guys. Movie Pitch: Ironside meets CSI and Enemy of the State. Bottom Line: Rhyme still intrigues in his eighth outing, while Deaver's scarily believable depiction of identity theft in a total-surveillance society stokes our paranoia. A -."
- On July 6, 2008 The Broken Window was on The New York Times hardcover fiction best seller list.
