= The Bone Collector =

1999 film by Phillip Noyce

- Theatrical release poster
- Directed by: Phillip Noyce
- Written by: Jeremy Iacone
- Based on: The Bone Collector by Jeffery Deaver
- Produced by: Martin Bregman; Michael Bregman; Louis A. Stroller
- Starring: Denzel Washington; Angelina Jolie; Queen Latifah; Michael Rooker; Mike McGlone; Luis Guzmán; Leland Orser; Ed O'Neill
- Cinematography: Dean Semler
- Edited by: William Hoy
- Music by: Craig Armstrong
- Production company: Bregman Productions
- Distributed by: Universal Pictures (United States and Canada); Columbia Pictures (through Columbia TriStar Film Distributors International; International)
- Release date: November 5, 1999
- Running time: 118 minutes
- Country: United States
- Language: English
- Budget: $48 million
- Box office: $151.5 million

The Bone Collector is a 1999 American psychological crime thriller film directed by Phillip Noyce and starring Denzel Washington and Angelina Jolie. An adaptation of the 1997 crime novel of the same name by Jeffery Deaver, it follows a quadriplegic homicide detective (Washington) and a newly-recruited patrol officer (Jolie) investigating the esoteric crimes of a serial killer in New York City.

The Bone Collector was released on November 5, 1999 by Universal Pictures, with Columbia TriStar Film Distributors International releasing in other territories. The film received mixed reviews from critics and grossed $151.5 million against a $48 million budget.

== Plot ==
In 1998 New York City, forensics expert Lincoln Rhyme is bed-bound after an accident that left him quadriplegic. Amelia Donaghy, a newly recruited patrol officer, discovers a mutilated corpse buried at a Civil War-era railroad bed. Rhyme directs her through a free video/audio feed sent from Donaghy to him in his bedroom. Due to clue-like objects found at the crime scene, Rhyme concludes that the scene was staged. Impressed by Donaghy's forensic instincts, he teams up with the young officer.

The killer poses as a taxi driver and, before Rhyme and Donaghy meet, abducts married couple Alan and Lindsay Rubin. Donaghy discovers Alan's body at the railroad station. Lindsay is revealed to be alive and tied up at a steam junction. Using the clues found at the railroad bed, including a torn piece of scrap paper, Rhyme successfully tracks the whereabouts of Lindsay. The detectives and Donaghy arrive but are unable to prevent Lindsay from being scalded to death by an open steam pipe. Donaghy finds a piece of bone by her body and another scrap of paper. Rhyme instructs Donaghy to sever Lindsay's hands in order to obtain evidence, but she refuses and storms off.

The killer abducts an NYU student, who is taken to a derelict slaughterhouse, tied to a pole, and left with an open wound that attracts nearby rats. Donaghy and Rhyme, again using the clues left by the killer at the scene of the previous murder, find the victim's body mutilated by rats. Donaghy finds another scrap of paper and a piece of bone. The pressure of the tense investigation and bureaucratic challenges to Donaghy and Rhyme's involvement in the case begin to have serious effects on Rhyme's health and stability. Thelma, Rhyme's caregiver and nurse, reveals to Donaghy his plans to end his life out of fear of seizures that could leave him in a vegetative state.

After piecing together the message the killer was sending using the paper scraps, Donaghy and Rhyme are led to an old crime novel called The Bone Collector, which details crimes the killer is replicating. The fictional outline leads them to the location of the next victims, a grandfather and granddaughter who have been tied to a pier during a rise in tide. The paramedics successfully resuscitate the young girl, but the grandfather dies. At the scene, Donaghy finds another piece of bone, part of an old police badge, and a subway map. These clues together with the asbestos left by the killer at the scene of Lindsay's death lead Donaghy to an abandoned subway station, where numbers on the side of a carriage have been tampered with to spell out Rhyme's police badge number.

Police captain Howard Cheney arrives at Rhyme's house with the intention of halting the investigation but is murdered by the killer alongside Thelma. The killer is revealed to be Richard Thompson, the medical technician in charge of Rhyme's medical equipment. Richard's real name is Marcus Andrews, a former forensics expert convicted because an article written by Rhyme exposed Andrews for planting evidence that resulted in the wrongful imprisonment of six innocent people, one of whom hanged himself. Maintaining his delusion that he was right to imprison those people, Andrews blames Rhyme for his imprisonment and the abuse he endured during his incarceration and has schemed to humiliate Rhyme by testing his abilities in a game of wits before killing him. Rhyme manages to crush Andrews' hand in his medical bed and further harms him severely by biting his neck. Unable to move, Rhyme is about to be stabbed to death by Marcus until Donaghy arrives and shoots him dead. The following Christmas, Rhyme, having abandoned his plans to commit suicide, meets his sister and niece coming to visit him, along with Donaghy and other colleagues.

== Cast ==
- Denzel Washington as Lincoln Rhyme
- Angelina Jolie as Amelia Donaghy
- Queen Latifah as Thelma
- Ed O'Neill as Detective Paulie Sellitto
- Michael Rooker as Captain Howard Cheney
- Mike McGlone as Detective Kenny Solomon
- Luis Guzmán as Eddie Ortiz
- Leland Orser as Richard Thompson / Marcus Andrews
- John Benjamin Hickey as Dr. Barry Lehman
- Bobby Cannavale as Steve

== Production ==
=== Development ===
The project originated when producer Martin Bregman acquired the film rights to the Jeffery Deaver novel of the same name; Phillip Noyce was brought on to direct. Jeremy Iacone penned the screenplay adaptation; while staying faithful to Deaver's source material, Iacone condensed the plot "down to three murders" and honed in on the dynamic between the lead characters. The script would undergo further work when Christopher Crowe was brought on to do a screenplay polish.

Universal Pictures sold half of the distribution rights to Columbia Pictures, as the studio was worried about making its money back. Noyce made a deal with the studio that if the production went over budget, he'd pay the difference out of his own pocket, and if it came in under budget, then he would get to keep half.

=== Casting ===
When the script was being written, the role of Lincoln Rhyme was written with Al Pacino in mind, since Bregman had served as producer on Pacino's previous films Serpico, Dog Day Afternoon, Scarface, and Carlito's Way. However, Pacino was unavailable as he was filming The Insider. Harrison Ford and Sean Connery were also suggested by the studio, but Noyce cast Denzel Washington in the lead role.

In preparation for his role as a quadriplegic, Washington met with quadriplegics including Christopher Reeve, and a police officer paralyzed by a gunshot wound.

For the role of Amelia Donaghy, both Demi Moore and Nicole Kidman were considered before Angelina Jolie was cast. Other principal roles were played by Michael Rooker, Queen Latifah, and Ed O'Neill.

=== Filming ===
Aside from exterior shots filmed on location in Manhattan, New York City, filming primarily took place in Montreal.

== Release ==
The film was originally slated for release on October 1, 1999, but was postponed to November 5, 1999.

=== Home media ===
Universal Pictures Home Entertainment released The Bone Collector on VHS and DVD in 2000. An HD DVD was released in 2006. On July 4, 2017, Universal issued the film on Blu-ray.

Kino Lorber reissued the film on Blu-ray and 4K UHD Blu-ray on October 14, 2025, featuring a new 4K restoration from the original camera negatives, in addition to newly-commissioned bonus materials, including two new audio commentaries with Kim Newman and Barry Forshaw, and film historians Steve Mitchell and Edwin Samuelson.

== Reception ==
=== Box office ===
The Bone Collector was a box-office success, grossing $151.5 million against a budget of $48 million.

=== Critical response ===
On Rotten Tomatoes, The Bone Collector holds an approval rating of 30% based on 90 reviews, with an average rating of 4.2/10. The site's critics consensus states: "A talented cast is wasted on a bland attempt at a suspenseful, serial killer flick." Metacritic gave the film a weighted average score of 45 out of 100 based on 33 critics, indicating "mixed or average reviews". Audiences surveyed by CinemaScore gave the film an average grade "B+" on an A+ to F scale.

Eric S. Arnold of Newsweek gives a mainly positive review, stating that "The Bone Collector may be formulaic—but many good recipes are." William Arnold of the Seattle Post-Intelligencer describes the film as having "the characteristics of a bad slasher movie" in a mainly negative review, calling the plot "ultimately preposterous". Multiple critics called out the improbabilities and cliches of the script and negatively compared the film to similar crime thrillers such as Seven and The Silence of the Lambs, but said Washington and Jolie's performances were just enough to make the film engrossing. Roger Ebert of the Chicago Sun-Times praised the acting, but deplored the plot's "utter absurdity", writing: "The movie is a peculiar experience to sit through, because the quality of the acting is so much better than the material deserves." Stephen Hunter of The Washington Post wrote: "As for the mystery that these forays into the shocking are meant to penetrate, it's probably the least interesting thing in the movie." He concluded: "Yet for all the carping one can do, the following is indisputably true: At the narrative level, The Bone Collector is extremely gripping. You may have as much fun tearing it apart in its aftermath as you do watching it, but the fun is still genuine."

== Potential sequel ==
In June 2023, it was reported that a sequel was in the works, with Washington and Jolie reprising their roles, according to Deaver, the 11th novel in his series, The Skin Collector, is more of a direct sequel to the first book.

== TV series adaptation ==
On January 17, 2019, it was announced that NBC had given the production a pilot order under the name Lincoln based on The Bone Collector novel. Sony Pictures Television and Universal Television were shopping the show to the American broadcast networks. VJ Boyd and Mark Bianculli would write the series and also serve as executive producers, and Seth Gordon would direct the potential pilot. In May 2019, NBC picked up the series, titled Lincoln Rhyme: Hunt for the Bone Collector, to premiere on January 10, 2020. The pilot was released early online on January 1, 2020, ahead of its network debut on January 10. The series was canceled after one season, on June 10, 2020.

Noyce briefly consulted on the project, but he declined an offer to direct the first episode: "I spoke to the makers and I said, "Okay, I'll make the pilot, but this is what I’d be looking to do". "They made their pilot, but they made the most basic mistakes in their casting". "They [also] tried to lighten it, which was not the way to exploit that material".
