= Jeffery Deaver =

American mystery and crime writer (born 1950)

- Deaver at a Waterstones bookstore in London, 2012
- Born: May 6, 1950 (age 76); Glen Ellyn, Illinois, U.S.
- Education: University of Missouri (BJ); Fordham University (JD)
- Occupation: Writer
- Writing career
- Genres: Mystery fiction, crime writer, thriller
- Website: www.jefferydeaver.com

Jeffery Deaver (born May 6, 1950) is an American mystery and crime writer. He has a bachelor of journalism degree from the University of Missouri and a J.D. degree from Fordham University. He began his career as a journalist and later practiced law before embarking on a career as a novelist. He has been awarded the Steel Dagger and Short Story Dagger from the British Crime Writers' Association and the Nero Award from The Wolfe Pack. He is also a three-time recipient of the Ellery Queen Reader's Award for Best Short Story of the Year and a winner of the British Thumping Good Read Award. His novels have appeared on bestseller lists around the world, including The New York Times, The Times, Italy's Corriere della Sera, The Sydney Morning Herald, and the Los Angeles Times.

== Life and career ==
Deaver was born near Chicago in Glen Ellyn, Illinois. His mother was an artist, and his father an advertising writer. His sister Julie Deaver is an author of young adult novels. He was inspired to write by From Russia With Love, a James Bond novel by Ian Fleming.

Deaver's most popular series features Lincoln Rhyme, a quadriplegic detective, and NYPD Detective Amelia Sachs.

Deaver's 2001 book,The Blue Nowhere, features criminal hackers (one using social engineering to commit murder), and a law enforcement computer crime unit. In it, Deaver pays homage to Lee de Forest, the inventor of the Audion (also known as the triode tube), who is considered to have opened the world to electronic development.

Deaver edited The Best American Mystery Stories 2009.

Three of Deaver's novels have been made into films:

- A Maiden's Grave adapted as Dead Silence (1997)
- The Bone Collector (1999)
- The Devil's Teardrop (2010)

The Bone Collector was adapted as a television series, Lincoln Rhyme: Hunt for the Bone Collector. Tracker, a television series based on his novel The Never Game, premiered in 2024.

Deaver also created the characters and—in a collaboration with 14 other noted writers—wrote the 17-part serial thriller The Chopin Manuscript narrated by Alfred Molina. It was broadcast on Audible.com from September 25 to November 13, 2007. It is also available in print.

Deaver was chosen to write a new James Bond novel: Carte Blanche is set in 2011 and was published on May 25, 2011. He is the second American author to write Bond novels, after Raymond Benson.

== Published works ==
=== Standalone works ===
- Mistress of Justice (1992) (ISBN 978-0-553-58445-5)
- The Lesson of Her Death (1993)
- Praying for Sleep (1994) (ISBN 978-0-451-20305-2)
- A Maiden's Grave (1995) (ISBN 978-0-451-20429-5)
- Speaking in Tongues (2000) (ISBN 978-0-684-87126-4)
- The Blue Nowhere (2001) (ISBN 978-0-340-76751-1)
- Garden of Beasts (2004) (ISBN 978-0-7435-6957-6)
- The Chopin Manuscript (2008) (collaborative fiction)
- The Bodies Left Behind (2008) (ISBN 978-1-4165-9561-8)
- Edge (2010)
- The October List (2013) (ISBN 978-1-4555-7664-7)
- "Buried" (2020) (Amazon Short Stories)

=== Rune Trilogy ===
1. Manhattan Is My Beat (1988)
2. Death of a Blue Movie Star (1990)
3. Hard News (1991)

=== John Pellam (Location Scout series) ===
1. Shallow Graves (1992)
2. Bloody River Blues (1993)
3. Hell's Kitchen (2001)

=== Lincoln Rhyme ===
1. The Bone Collector (1997)
2. The Coffin Dancer (1998)
3. The Empty Chair (2000)
4. The Stone Monkey (2002)
5. The Vanished Man (2003) (includes an appearance by Parker Kincaid)
6. The Twelfth Card (2005) (includes an appearance by Parker Kincaid)
7. The Cold Moon (2006) (Introduces Kathryn Dance)
8. The Broken Window (2008)
9. The Burning Wire (2010)
10. The Kill Room (2013)
11. The Skin Collector (2014)
12. The Steel Kiss (2016)
13. The Burial Hour (2017)
14. The Cutting Edge (2018)
15. The Midnight Lock (2021)
16. The Watchmaker's Hand (2023)
17. The Collateral Heart (2026)

=== Kathryn Dance ===
1. The Sleeping Doll (2007) (includes a brief appearance by Lincoln Rhyme)
2. Roadside Crosses (2009)
3. XO (2012) (includes a brief appearance by Lincoln Rhyme)
4. Solitude Creek (May 12, 2015)

=== Parker Kincaid ===
- The Devil's Teardrop (1999) (introduces Parker Kincaid, includes a scene with Lincoln Rhyme)

=== Colter Shaw ===
1. Captivated (short) (2019)
2. The Never Game (2019)
3. The Second Hostage (short) (2020)
4. The Goodbye Man (2020)
5. Forgotten (short) (2021)
6. The Final Twist (2021)
7. The Deadline Clock (short) (2022)
8. Hunting Time (2022)
9. South of Nowhere (2025)

=== James Bond ===
- Carte Blanche (2011)

=== Collections ===
- A Confederacy of Crime (2001)
- Twisted (2003)
- More Twisted (2006) (includes a story featuring Lincoln Rhyme)
- Trouble in Mind (2014) (includes two stories featuring Lincoln Rhyme, one story featuring Kathryn Dance and one story featuring John Pellam)
- The Lineup: The World's Greatest Crime Writers Tell the Inside Story of Their Greatest Detectives (2009) (Includes a short Mysterious Profile about Lincoln Rhyme)

=== Anthologies ===
- Faceoff (2014) (includes Lincoln Rhyme vs. Lucas Davenport in “Rhymes With Prey,” by Jeffery Deaver and John Sandford
- Nothing Good Happens After Midnight (2020) edited by Jeffery Deaver (includes his story "Midnight Sonata") and includes Rhys Bowen, Linwood Barclay, Heather Graham, et al.

== Adaptations ==
- Dead Silence (1997) A HBO film based on A Maiden's Grave. Starring James Garner, Kim Coates, Marlee Matlin and Lolita Davidovich.
- The Bone Collector (1999) A feature film based on The Bone Collector. Starring Denzel Washington, Angelina Jolie, Queen Latifah, Michael Rooker and Ed O'Neill.
- The Devil's Teardrop (2010) A Lifetime television film based on The Devil's Teardrop. Starring Tom Everett Scott and Natasha Henstridge.
- Lincoln Rhyme: Hunt for the Bone Collector (2020) An NBC television series, based on The Bone Collector. Starring Russell Hornsby and Arielle Kebbel.
- Tracker (2024) A CBS television series, based on The Never Game. Starring Justin Hartley, Robin Weigert, Abby McEnany, Eric Graise, Fiona Rene, and Wendy Crewson.
