= Triumph of the Spirit =

1989 film by Robert M. Young

- Theatrical release poster
- Directed by: Robert M. Young
- Written by: Andrzej Krakowski; Laurence Heath
- Produced by: Arnold Kopelson; Shimon Arama
- Starring: Willem Dafoe; Edward James Olmos; Robert Loggia; Wendy Gazelle
- Cinematography: Curtis Clark
- Edited by: Norman Buckley; Arthur Coburn
- Music by: Cliff Eidelman
- Production company: Nova International Films
- Distributed by: Triumph Releasing Corporation
- Release date: 8 December 1989
- Running time: 120 minutes
- Country: United States
- Language: English
- Budget: $12 million
- Box office: $408,839

Triumph of the Spirit is a 1989 American biographical drama film directed by Robert M. Young and starring Willem Dafoe and Edward James Olmos. The screenplay was inspired by true events, the same as the older Slovak film The Boxer and Death directed by Peter Solan. The majority of the film is set in the German POW camp at Auschwitz during the Holocaust and details how the Jewish Greek boxer Salamo Arouch was forced to fight other internees to the death for the SS guards' entertainment.

== Plot ==
A stevedore in Thessaloniki, Greece, Salamo Arouch's passion is boxing. Captured along with his family and fiancée Allegra in 1943 and interned in Auschwitz, Arouch is used by his SS captors as entertainment, forced to box against fellow prisoners. He knows that if he refuses, his family will be punished; if he wins, he will be given extra rations which he can share with them; if he loses, he will be sent to the gas chamber. As his family and friends die around him, he has only his love of Allegra and his grim determination to keep her alive.

The film follows the early life story of Salamo Arouch, though it takes some artistic liberties including the early introduction of wife Allegra (a pseudonym for Marta Yechiel), whom Arouch did not actually meet until after the liberation of the camp.

== Cast ==
- Willem Dafoe as Salamo Arouch
- Edward James Olmos as Gypsy
- Robert Loggia as Poppa Arouch
- Wendy Gazelle as Allegra
- Kelly Wolf as Elena
- Costas Mandylor as Avram
- Kario Salem as Jacko
- Edward Zentara as Janush
- Hartmut Becker as Maj. Rauscher

== Production ==
Young was reluctant to make the film when he was first approached with the script, finding the topic too momentous to cover; he only agreed to direct when provided a script that focused only on one small element, "like a cork, bubbling on the surface of the sea." The film, which positions Arouch as a witness to the horrors of the Holocaust, was shot on a budget of US$12 million. Filming with permission at the Auschwitz concentration camp, producers were able to utilize some existing structures but were also tasked with recreating a crematory given the condition of those that remain. The film also shot briefly in Israel. Boxing trainer Teddy Atlas, who played the role of Klaus Silber, was boxing consultant.

== Theme ==
The title of the film is suggestive of human triumph, a view to which star Dafoe subscribed, but others, including actor Olmos perceived its impact differently: "[W]hat does...[the film] project? The moral decay needed to survive in the camp." Lawrence Baron, the author of 2005's Projecting the Holocaust Into the Present, agreed, stating that "the cumulative impression...undermines whatever uplifting impact its title and publicity imply.... A closer scrutiny of the movie reveals that it is not about the triumph of the spirit but rather about 'choiceless choices', to use Lawrence Langer's term for the dilemma faced by death camp inmates, who were never offered any moral alternatives to prolong their survival." Baron suggests that this message is crystallized in one scene where Arouch is set to fight his best friend Jacko, who has already been beaten by the guards, knowing that the loser will be consigned to the gas chamber; when he balks, his friend is executed on the spot.

== Critical reception ==
On review aggregator website Rotten Tomatoes, the film holds a 63% approval rating based on 8 reviews, with a rating average of 5.50/10.

In its review, The New York Times praised the performances of Dafoe ("harrowingly good") and Robert Loggia ("a memorably physical performance"), but complained that the film overall is "thoroughly mundane", obvious and sentimental, also singling out for criticism the "outstandingly intrusive score". Also taking note of the "intrusive score", Rolling Stone found all of the cast melodramatic with the exception of Dafoe's "disciplined performance" and dismissed the film as "earnest but woefully misguided". Time Magazine noted that the film "is too respectful of its subject to find more in it than noble cliches", highlighting Young's "bland direction" and concluding that "[t]he film's only and considerable virtue lies in its documentation of the desperate strategies people devised to stay alive in the death camps." Roger Ebert of the Chicago Sun-Times felt that, by showcasing the fights and expecting viewers to root for Arouch, the filmmakers in effect force audiences to behave no differently from the Nazis in the story. The 2005 book Projecting the Holocaust Into the Present, though acknowledging the generally negative critical reviews, opines that "Young's depiction of the ethical vacuum that the Nazis devised at Auschwitz makes the movie disturbing and effective."

== See also ==
- List of boxing films
- Salamo Arouch
- Harry Haft
- Noah Klieger
- Victor Perez (Tunisian boxer)
- Antoni Czortek, a Polish boxer who fought for his life in Auschwitz. Once with a vastly heavier German member of the SS, who wanted to beat and kill him. Czortek won with his first punch, knocking the German to the floor.
- Tadeusz Pietrzykowski, another Polish boxer famous for his fights in Auschwitz
- The Boxer and Death, (1962) movie based on Pietrzykowski's fights in Auschwitz
- The Champion, (2020) movie based on Pietrzykowski's fights in Auschwitz
- The Survivor, (2021) movie based on Polish heavyweight Harry Haft's fights in Auschwitz
