= The Baker and the Beauty =

The Baker and the Beauty may refer to:

- The Baker and the Beauty (American TV series) (2020)
- The Baker and the Beauty (Indian TV series) (2021)
- Beauty and the Baker, a 2013 Israeli series upon which the American and Indian adaptations are based
