= Vanished (2026 TV series) =

American television miniseries

- Promotional poster
- Genre: Mystery thriller
- Created by: David Hilton; Preston Thompson
- Based on: A story by David Hilton
- Written by: Preston Thompson
- Directed by: Barnaby Thompson
- Starring: Kaley Cuoco; Sam Claflin; Matthias Schweighöfer; Karin Viard; Simon Abkarian; Dar Zuzovsky
- Country of origin: United States
- Original language: English
- No. of episodes: 4

Production
- Executive producers: Barnaby Thompson; Preston Thompson; David Kosse; James Clayton; Stuart Ford; Lourdes Diaz; Miguel A. Palos Jr.; Christoph Pellander; Sebastian Lueckel; Kaley Cuoco
- Production companies: AGC Television; Slow Burn Entertainment; Rockwood Pictures; Fragile Films

Original release
- Network: MGM+
- Release: February 1 – February 22, 2026

Vanished is an American mystery thriller television miniseries created by David Hilton and Preston Thompson. It stars Kaley Cuoco, Sam Claflin, Matthias Schweighöfer, and Karin Viard and premiered on February 1, 2026, on MGM+.

== Plot ==
After a romantic getaway in Paris, a woman's partner goes missing during a trip to the south of France.

== Cast and characters ==
- Kaley Cuoco as Alice Monroe
- Sam Claflin as Tom, Alice's boyfriend
- Matthias Schweighöfer as Alex Durand
- Karin Viard as Helene Lando
- Simon Abkarian as Inspector Drax
- Dar Zuzovsky as Mira Mazraoui

== Production ==
The series is directed by Barnaby Thompson and produced by AGC Television, having been created by David Hilton and Preston Thompson, and written by Preston Thompson. Executive producers include James Clayton, David Kosse, Barnaby Thompson, Preston Thompson, and Stuart Ford, Lourdes Diaz, and Miguel A. Palos Jr. for AGC. The cast is led by Kaley Cuoco, Sam Claflin, Matthias Schweighöfer, and Karin Viard. Filming took place in France with filming locations including Paris and Marseille. Principal photography was underway by May 2025. That month, Simon Abkarian and Dar Zuzovsky were reported to have joined the cast.

== Episodes ==
No.	Title	Directed by	Written by	Original release date
1	"Rosefinch"	Barnaby Thompson	Preston Thompson	February 1, 2026
Alice, an archaeologist, and Tom, who works in refugee aid, have a long-distance relationship where they meet in hotels all over the world. They meet in Paris, and Tom invites Alice to a resort in Arles. During the train ride, Tom leaves his seat to take a phone call and doesn't return. Alice searches the train and questions people with translating help from a passenger named Helene, but is unable to find Tom. Alice is unable to contact Tom by phone, save for a brief call from him where she hears water and a car door closing. In Marseille, Police Inspector Drax tells Alice a person can only be declared missing after 48 hours. Alice investigates a spot on the train route where the train stopped briefly, and finds signs she believes are of Tom leaving the train. Alice tells Helene, a journalist, her suspicion that Tom was kidnapped, and Helene advises her to find evidence. Alice searches Tom's things and learns that he lied about a phone call, and that while he claimed that his new tattoo was inspired by Alice, his colleague Mira has the same tattoo.
2	"Limerence"	Barnaby Thompson	Preston Thompson	February 8, 2026
Alice visits an office of the charity Tom works at and meets his colleague, Alex Durand. Alex tells Alice that Tom has been acting irrationally lately, and promises to help her find him. Alice and Helene, following a note in Tom's journal, track down a yacht that makes Alice believe that Tom left to be with Mira. Alex confirms Alice's suspicions and advises her to go to Arles in case he shows up there. Alice is about to leave Marseille but instead decides to track down Maurice Geroux, the conductor on the train who was acting strangely when Tom disappeared. Alice finds Maurice, but he has been killed by a man who has been following her on Alex's orders. Alice flees the scene and is announced on the news as a suspect for Maurice's murder. The assassin attacks Alice at her hotel, and she is saved by Helene. Helene tells Alice that she has been investigating Tom for human trafficking and was following him on the train, and that Tom likely got off the train because he saw her.
3	"The Fatted Calf"	Barnaby Thompson	Preston Thompson	February 15, 2026
Alice and Helene covertly follow Alex, who visits the port and later meets Drax. Alex then picks up Tom, and Alice chases them to a formal event, which Tom is attending with Mira. Alice confronts Tom, who apologizes for his behavior but doesn't explain and asks her to leave. Alice is spotted by police but evades them. Alice threatens to leave but Helene argues that Alice wants the truth as much as she does. Helene takes Alice to see Hebe, a young Syrian prostitute who was trafficked into France, and Hebe reacts with fear when Alice shows her a photo of Tom. Using a bill of lading that Tom left in his journal, Alice and Helene work together to track down a container that has just arrived and sneak into the port to find it. They break into the container and find frightened women and children inside.
4	"Run, Alice, Run"	Barnaby Thompson	Preston Thompson	February 22, 2026
Alice and Helene are caught and brought to a warehouse where they are questioned by Tom, Alex and Mira. Alex and Mira want to kill Alice and Helene, but Tom secretly gives Alice the means to escape. Alice flees and has to leave Helene behind. Alice calls the police, and leads Drax and his team to where Tom, Alex and Mira are sorting the kidnapped refugees. A shootout occurs, and Tom reveals himself to be an Interpol agent who has been working undercover to expose the human trafficking ring. Helene is shot, and Alex and Mira are killed. Tom explains to Alice that he was recruited for this specific mission and since it's over, he is done with Interpol and can move to Princeton with her. Alice is angry, but the pair return to their hotel and have sex. Helene, who is injured but recovering, interviews Alice for her expose. Alice leaves Marseille without Tom, but leaves a note for him.

== Release ==
In October 2025, MGM+ acquired rights to broadcast the series in the US, Latin America, Spain, Italy, Belgium and the Netherlands. Its sister company, Amazon Prime Video, had previously acquired the rights for Canada, the UK, Ireland, Australia, and New Zealand in May 2025.

The four-episode series premiered on MGM+ on February 1, 2026.

== Reception ==
The series holds a 46% approval rating on review aggregator Rotten Tomatoes, based on 13 critic reviews. On Metacritic, the series received a score of 50 out of 100 based on 5 critics, indicating "mixed or average".
