= Welcome to America =

Welcome to America or Welcome 2 America may refer to:

== Music ==
=== Albums ===
- Welcome to America (Schoolly D album) is a 1994 album by Schooly D, and its title track.
- Welcome to America – Songs of the American Immigrants, a 1990 album by Joe Glazer
- Welcome To America, a 2000 album by D. H. Peligro
- Welcome 2 America, a 2021 posthumous album by Prince

=== Songs ===
- "Welcome to America" (song), by Die Warzau, 1989
- "Welcome to America", a song by Storms for the 1999 film Chalo America
- "Welcome to America", a song by Lil B from the 2012 album Choices and Flowers
- "Welcome to America", a song by P-Money from the 2013 album Gratitude
- "Welcome to America", a song by Lecrae from the 2014 album Anomaly
- "Welcome to America", a song by Kembe X from the 2016 album Talk Back
- "Welcome to America", a song by Black Thought from the 2021 soundtrack album Judas and the Black Messiah: The Inspired Album to the film Judas and the Black Messiah

=== Other ===
- "Welcome to America", a musical number from the 2015 musical comedy stage play Something Rotten!
- "Welcome to America", a musical number from the 2018 stage musical Soft Power
- "Welcome 2 America: 21-Night Stands", the 2011 U.S. leg of the Welcome 2 concert tour by Prince

== Film and television ==
- Welcome to America, a 2002 film by Reynaldo Villalobos
- "Welcome to America", a Frontline episode, 1984
- "Welcome to America", a 1996 episode of TV series High Incident
- "Welcome to America", a 2013 episode of TV series Family Tree
- "Welcome to America", an episode of Naked and Afraid, 2024

== Literature ==
- "Welcome to America", a 2014 comic book with art by Terry Dodson
- Välkommen til Amerika, a 2016 novel by Linda Boström Knausgård, released in English in 2019 as Welcome to America
- "Welcome to America", a 2018 cover of Time magazine

== Other uses ==
- "Elephant Parade: Welcome to America", a 2013 sculpture exhibition by Elephant Parade
- "Welcome To America" a 2021 series of art exhibitions by Tomer Peretz
- "Welcome to America", a 2012 mural by Gran Fury
- Modasucka: Welcome to America, a 2005 comedy album by Michael Blackson
- "Welcome to America", a track from the 2014 comedy album 2776

== See also ==
- Coming to America (disambiguation)
- Welcome (disambiguation)
- America (disambiguation)
