= Dar Zuzovsky =

Israeli actress and model

Dar Zuzovsky דר זוזובסקי
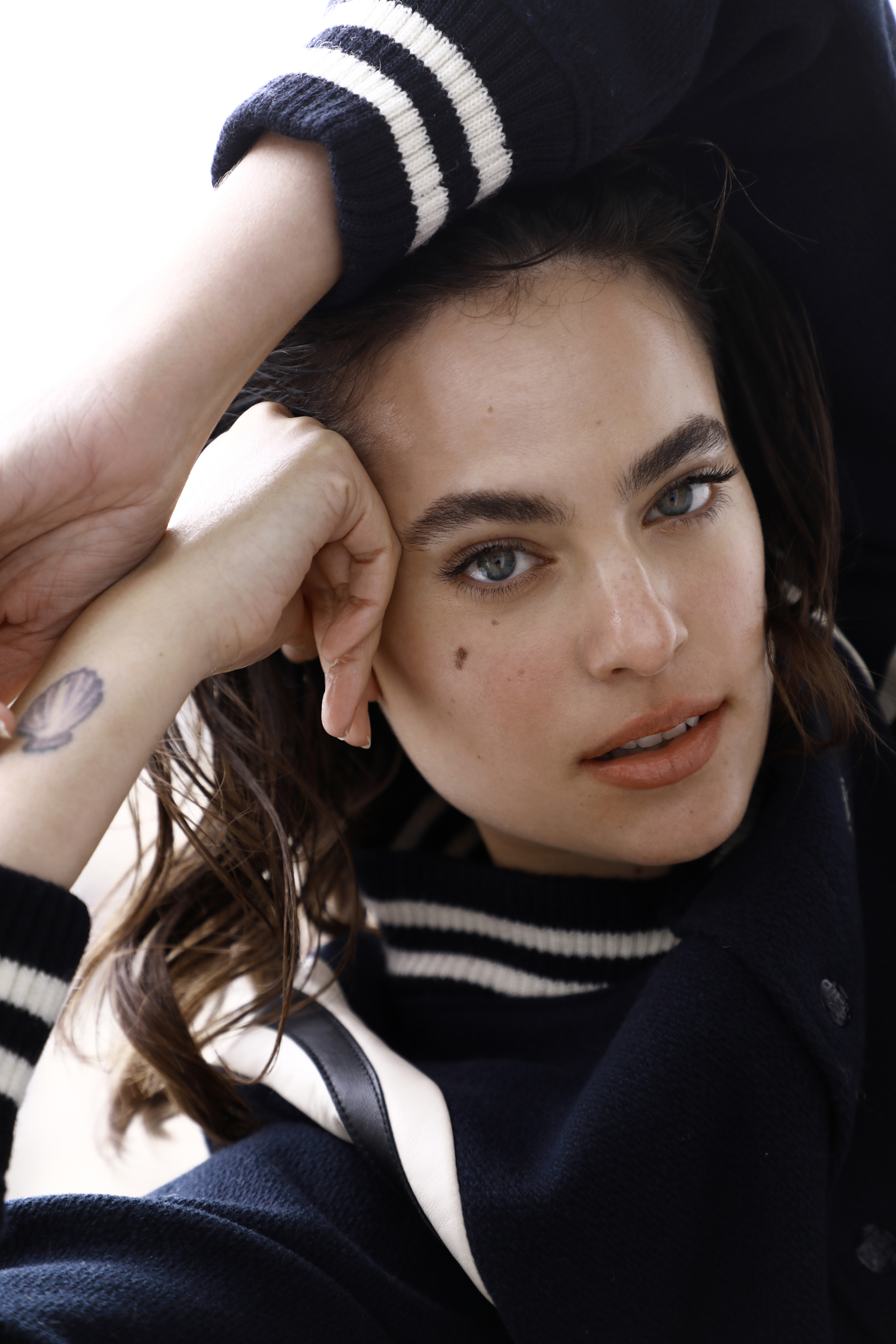
- Zuzovsky in 2021
- Born: 24 February 1991 (age 35); Tel Aviv, Israel
- Occupations: Model; Actress
- Modelling information
- Height: 1.75 m (5 ft 9 in)
- Hair colour: Brown
- Eye colour: Blue
- Agency: Elite Model Management (London); Women Management (Paris); Modelwerk (Hamburg); Women Direct (Milan)

Dar Zuzovsky (Hebrew: דר זוזובסקי; born 24 February 1991) is an Israeli actress and model. As an actress she had appeared in Hostages and Beauty and the Baker.

== Early life ==
Zuzovsky was born in Tel Aviv, Israel, to Israeli-born parents of Ashkenazi Jewish (Polish-Jewish and Czechoslovak-Jewish) descent. In Hebrew, her first name means "mother of pearl". She grew up in the neighbouring city of Ramat HaSharon along with her younger brother. Zuzovsky used to be a Scouts instructor. She graduated high school in 2009, majoring in theatre.

Zuzovsky then volunteered for the pre-army Service Year as a counsellor in a boarding school for at-risk youth. Her parents separated and decided to get divorced during that period. Subsequently, she was enlisted to the Israel Defence Forces as a soldier, where she served as a photographer of Israeli military bands.

== Career ==
She began modelling at the age of 15. As a model, Zuzovsky has appeared in advertising campaigns for Urban Outfitters, Samsung, Sephora and in 2014 appeared in a ten-page spread for Italian Cosmopolitan. In 2016 she became a spokesmodel for Castro, Israel's largest fashion company.

In 2017 Zuzovsky was chosen to appear in a Los Angeles mural by Israeli contemporary artist Tomer Peretz.

In 2021, she starred in The Survivor, a Holocaust film, directed by Barry Levinson.

In 2024, she was cast in the Martin Scorsese docudrama series, Martin Scorsese Presents: The Saints. She played the role of Mary Magdalene in episodes that aired in 2025 on Fox Nation.

In 2025, she was cast in the upcoming US series, Vanished.

== Personal life ==
Zuzovsky started dating Israeli actor and musician Lee Biran in 2014. They separated in 2016. Later that year she briefly dated Israeli musician Asaf Avidan. In 2023 she dated the actor Victor Lawrence and they broke up after less than a year of being in a relationship. She has been in a relationship with Sam Claflin since 2025.

== Filmography ==
Year	Title	Role	Notes
2012	New York	Hezi	TV series
2012	The Greenhouse	Natalie Klein	TV series
2013	Hostages	Noa Danon	Season 1 cast member
2015	Ibiza	Rona	Feature Film
2015	Plan B	Ofri	Keshet Media Group comedy series
2013-2016	Scarred	Nohar Shif	13 episodes
2017	Beauty and the Baker	Eden / Daniela	Season 2 cast member
2018	Papa	Sheila	Feature Film
2021	The Survivor	Leah	
2024	Een schitterend gebrek (A Beautiful Imperfection)	Lucia	Feature Film based on the historical novel “In Lucia’s Eyes” by Arthur Japin
2025	Martin Scorsese Presents: The Saints	Mary Magdalene	2 episodes
2026	Vanished	Mira Mazraoui	TV series
