= Before This Night Is Over =

- Directed by: Peter Solan
- Starring: Stanislav Dančiak; Marián Labuda
- Release date: 25 March 1966
- Running time: 86 min
- Country: Czechoslovakia
- Language: Slovak

Before This Night Is Over (Slovak: Kým sa skončí táto noc) is a 1966 Slovak drama film directed by Peter Solan.
