= Piotr Głowacki =

Polish actor

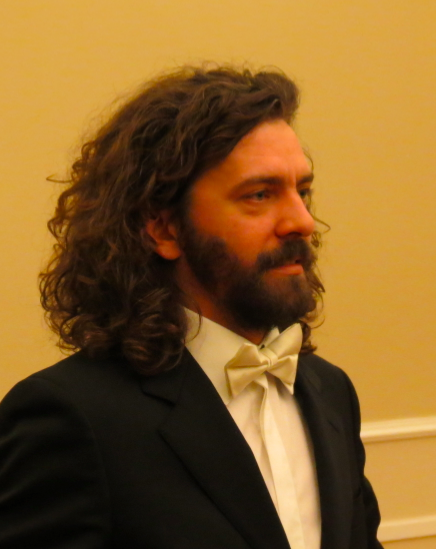
- Piotr Głowacki in 2012
- Born: 29 March 1980 (age 46); Toruń, Poland
- Occupation: Actor
- Years active: 2004–present

Piotr Głowacki (born 29 March 1980) is a Polish actor. He appeared in more than sixty films since 2004. Awarded with the most prestigious prize for a young actor of his generation in 2014, Głowacki has since played in major Polish and international movies.

He is married to Agnieszka Głowacka and has two children, Ida and Aaron.

== Selected filmography ==
| Year | Title | Role | Notes |
|---|---|---|---|
| 2011 | 80 Million | Sobczak (captain of SB) | nominated for a Golden Duck award for this role |
| 2011 | In Darkness | Jacek Frenkiel | |
| 2013 | The Girl from the Wardrobe | Jacek | |
| 2014 | Gods | Marian Zembala | Polish Film Award Eagle for the best supporting actor |
| 2016 | Planet Single | Marcel | |
| 2016 | Marie Curie: The Courage of Knowledge | Albert Einstein | |
| 2016 | Dark Crimes | Victor | |
| 2018 | Who Will Write Our History | Emanuel Ringelblum | |
| 2020 | The Champion | Tadeusz Pietrzykowski | |
| 2022 | Broad Peak | Aleksander Lwow | |
