= Coming to America (disambiguation) =

Coming to America is a 1988 comedy film starring Eddie Murphy and James Earl Jones.

Coming to America or Coming 2 America, may also refer to:

- "Coming to America" (The System song), a 1988 song from the film of the same name
- "America" (Neil Diamond song), a 1981 pop song
- Coming to America (TV pilot), a 1989 television pilot based on the 1988 film
- Victoria Beckham: Coming to America, a 2007 American television series
- Coming 2 America, a 2021 sequel to the 1988 film

== See also ==
- Welcome to America (disambiguation)
- America (disambiguation)
- Come (disambiguation)
