= Harry Haft =

Polish boxer (1925–2007)

Personal information
- Nationality: Polish
- Born: Herschel (Hertzko) Haft; July 28, 1925 Bełchatów, Poland
- Died: November 3, 2007 (aged 82) Pembroke Pines, Florida, US
- Height: 5 ft 9 in (1.75 m)
- Weight: Heavyweight

Boxing career
- Stance: Orthodox

Boxing record
- Total fights: 21
- Wins: 13
- Win by KO: 8
- Losses: 8
- Draws: 0
- No contests: 0

Harry Haft (July 28, 1925 – November 3, 2007), also known as Herschel Haft, was a survivor of the Auschwitz concentration camp where he boxed fellow inmates to survive, the losers being executed. He was briefly a professional boxer in post-war Germany, and boxed as a light heavyweight in the United States from 1948–1949.

== Early life ==
Born in Bełchatów, Poland on 28 July 1925, he was three years old when his father died. In 1939, when he was 14, Haft witnessed the invasion and German occupation of Poland. Under Nazi occupation, he ran a smuggling business with his older brother.

== Deportation to Auschwitz ==
By 1942, because he was Jewish, Haft was imprisoned in several German-Nazi slave labor camps where he was beaten and starved. Because of his strong physical stature, by 1943 an SS overseer trained him to be a boxer, and had him compete at fights to the death in front of the military personnel. The fights took place at the concentration camp Jaworzno, which was situated at a coal mine north of Auschwitz. Haft fought a total of 76 fights there. When the camp in Jaworzno was dissolved because of the advancing Soviet Red Army, thousands of its surviving inmates were sent West on death marches to Germany. Haft managed to escape from one such march in April 1945. On the run, he killed a bathing German soldier and donned his uniform. During the remaining weeks until the end of the war, he moved from village to village. At one point he killed two elderly people who harbored him on their farm because he feared they had discovered he was not a German soldier and would turn him in to authorities.

=== Displaced Person's Camp refugee, 1945–1947 ===
In 1945, Haft found refuge in a Displaced Person's Camp operated by the U.S. Army in occupied Germany. In January 1947, he won an "Amateur Jewish Heavyweight Championship" organized by the US army in post-war Munich, receiving a trophy by General Lucius Clay.

== Brief boxing career in America ==
In 1948, aged 22, he emigrated to the US with the help of an uncle in New Jersey. There he made his living by competing as a light heavyweight prizefighter during 1948 to 1949. Haft's professional record consists of 21 fights, of a total of 104 rounds, with 13 wins (8 by KO) and 8 losses (5 by KO). His height was recorded as 5′ 9″ (175 cm), and his weight as between 168 and 180 lb. He won his first twelve fights, but lost against a more experienced boxer, Irish-born Pat O'Connor in Westchester County Center on 5 January 1949. O'Connor had previously held Irish National light heavy and middleweight championships.

He had a convincing win on 14 January 1949 in Binghamton, New York, 1:14 into the first of six rounds, when he scored a knockout, with a right cross that broke the jaw of his opponent Billy Kilby. On 30 May 1949, despite being outweighed by 14 pounds, he defeated Johnny Pretzie in Brooklyn in a technical knockout, 2:38 into the fourth round. Pretzie was a strong puncher with an impressive knockout record, who had met Rocky Marciano only two months earlier.

After this win, his record (which had included only two wins since his loss to O'Connor) worsened. He lost to New Yorker Roland LaStarza on 27 June 1949 in a 4th-round TKO at Brooklyn's Coney Island. LaStarza was an undefeated Italian-American, had an exceptional record of 33 wins, and had taken several Golden Gloves light heavyweight championships in 1944-5. In 1953, LaStarza would challenge Rocky Marciano in a close fight for the World heavyweight championship. Haft's final fight was against future champion Rocky Marciano, on 18 July 1949 in Rhode Island Auditorium, in what was Marciano's 18th professional fight. Haft made a good showing in the first round, landing a blow to Marciano's stomach that was the bout's first punch, and went blow for blow in the first minute of the second, but was knocked out by Marciano in the first half of the third round after receiving a flurry of punches. In his biography, Haft claimed that he was threatened by the Mafia and forced to throw the fight against Marciano.

While looking for work in New York City after the war, Haft experienced an incident of anti-Semitic hostility from a potential employer. The employer, a man known as Mr. T., told Harry that he wouldn't hire Jews and demanded that he leave. Haft was shocked and hurt by the discrimination leveled at him, and he realized that America was not the safe haven from prejudice and discrimination that he once thought it was.

== Marriage and boxing retirement ==
After his loss to Marciano, Haft retired. He married Miriam Wofsoniker in November 1949 and opened a fruit and vegetable store in Brooklyn. His eldest son, Alan Scott, was born in 1950, followed by a daughter and another son.

In April 2007, Haft was inducted into the National Jewish Sports Hall of Fame. He died of cancer, in November of the same year, in Pembroke Pines, Florida, at the age of 82.

=== Legacy ===
Haft told his life's story to his son Alan Scott in 2003, who edited and published it in 2006, with contributions from historians John Radzilowski and Mike Silver. On the basis of the published biography, Reinhard Kleist created a graphic novel, which was published sequentially in the German periodical Frankfurter Allgemeine Zeitung during 2011. The book was nominated for a 2014 Ignatz Award for Outstanding Graphic Novel.

In 2018, a film about Haft was announced. The biographical film, titled The Survivor, is directed by Barry Levinson and stars Ben Foster as Haft. The film premiered at the Toronto International Film Festival in 2021 and was released on HBO on April 27, 2022, Yom HaShoah, Israel's Holocaust remembrance day.

== Selected fights ==
2 Wins, 3 Losses
Result	Opponent(s)	Date	Location	Duration	Notes
Loss	Pat O'Connor	5 Jan 1949	White Plains, NY	8 Rounds	Was Irish light heavy champ
Win	Billy Kilby	14 Jan, 1949	Binghamton, NY	1st Round KO	
Win	Johnny Pretzie	30 May 1949	Coney Island, Brooklyn	4th Round KO	Pretzie had already fought Marciano and lost most of his matches until 1962.
Loss	Roland LaStarza	27 June 1949	Coney Island, Brooklyn	4th Round TKO	Heavyweight contender Undefeated with 33 total wins
Loss	Rocky Marciano	18 July 1949	Providence, RI	3rd Round KO	Future World heavy champ

== See also ==
- Salamo Arouch
- Victor Perez
- Szapsel Rotholc
- Johann Trollmann
- Tadeusz Pietrzykowski
- Triumph of the Spirit
