= Ben Foster (actor) =

American actor (born 1980)

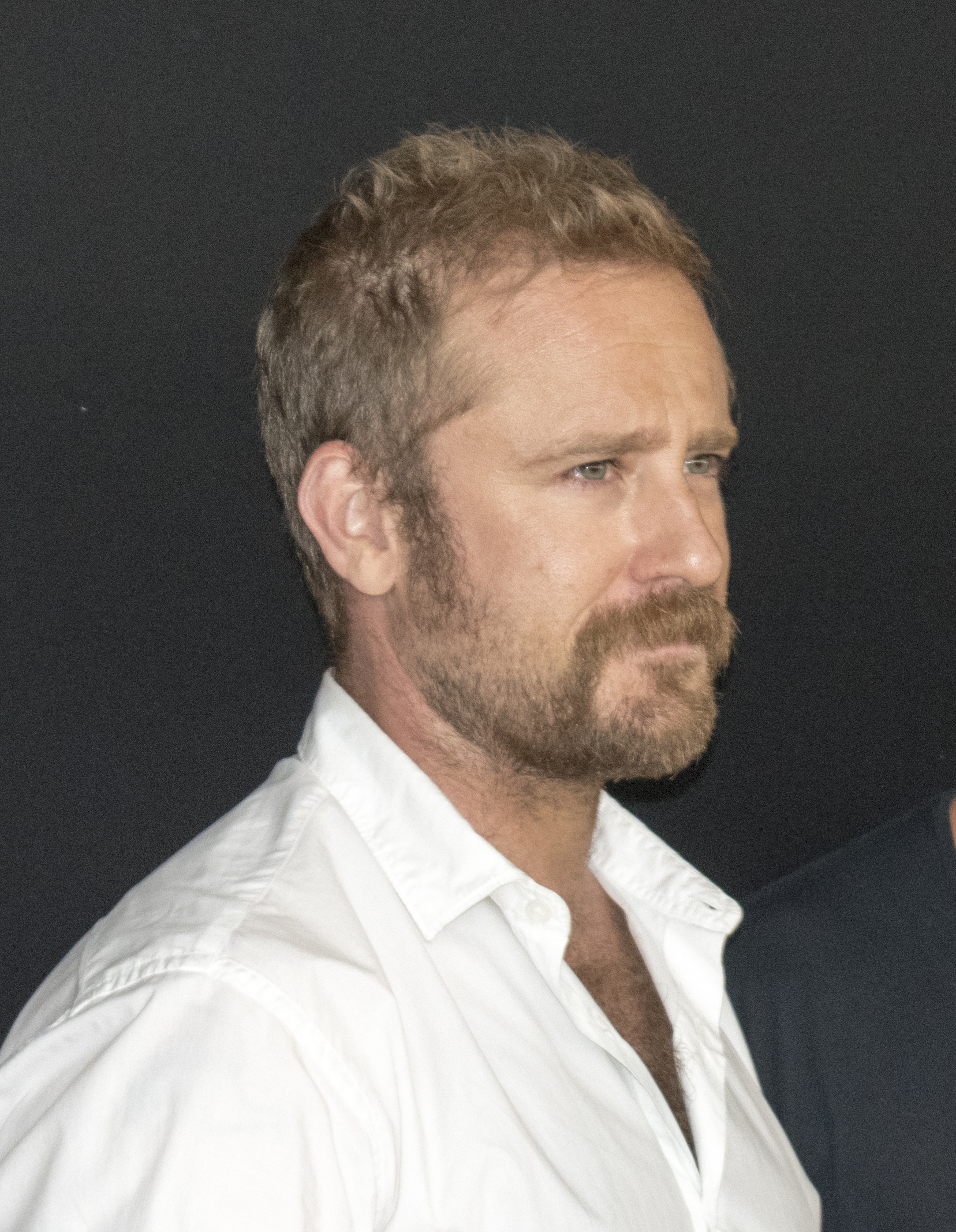
- Foster in 2018
- Born: Benjamin A. Foster; October 29, 1980 (age 46); Boston, Massachusetts, U.S.
- Occupation: Actor
- Years active: 1995–present
- Spouse: Laura Prepon (m. 2018; sep. 2024)
- Children: 2
- Relatives: Jon Foster (brother)

Benjamin A. Foster (born October 29, 1980) is an American actor. His films include The Punisher (2004), X-Men: The Last Stand and Alpha Dog (both 2006), 30 Days of Night and 3:10 to Yuma (both 2007), The Messenger and Pandorum (both 2009), The Mechanic (2011), Contraband (2012), Kill Your Darlings and Lone Survivor (both 2013), The Program (2015), Warcraft (2016), and Leave No Trace (2018). He has won an Independent Spirit Award for portraying Tanner Howard in Hell or High Water (2016). He also had a recurring role as Russell Corwin in Six Feet Under (2003–05).

Foster has often received praise from critics for his "intense" and "unhinged" performances in numerous films. Film critic Matt Zoller Seitz described Foster in 2016 as "one of those actors who makes even a bad film worth seeing. Sometimes he suggests the film you'd rather be watching."

== Early life ==
Foster was born in Boston on October 29, 1980, the son of Steven and Gillian Foster (née Kirwan), both restaurant owners. He has described his parents as "free-spirited, Vietnam-protesting hippies". He has a younger brother, Jon, who is also an actor. In 1984, the Foster family relocated to Fairfield, Iowa, when their Boston home was broken into by robbers while they were present.

Foster's father is Jewish, and his mother has Irish ancestry. Foster was raised in his father's faith. His paternal grandparents were Celia (née Segal) and Abraham Foster, who was a prominent judge and politician in Boston; their families were of Romanian Jewish and Ukrainian Jewish origins and had emigrated from the Russian Empire. As a youth he attended Interlochen Arts Camp and studied theatre there.

== Career ==
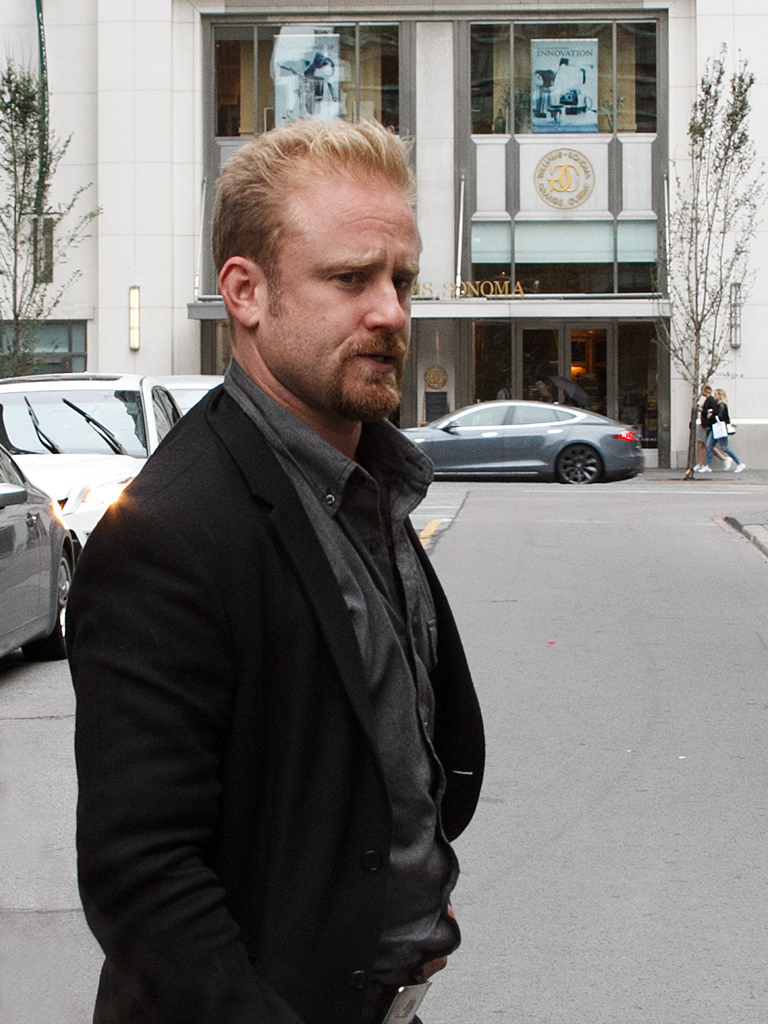
Foster at the Toronto Film Festival in 2015

Foster began working as an actor when he was 14 years old. From 1995 to 1997, he starred in the Disney Channel television series Flash Forward. His first major film role was in the 1999 Barry Levinson film, Liberty Heights, which Todd McCarthy described as an "outstanding bigscreen debut."

In 2001, he acted in the film Get Over It. Foster also had a recurring role as Russell Corwin (22 episodes) in the HBO original series, Six Feet Under. After appearing in the films 11:14 and The Punisher, Foster appeared in Hostage with Bruce Willis, Kevin Pollak, and Michelle Horn. In 2006, Foster appeared in X-Men: The Last Stand as the comic-book hero Angel / Warren Worthington III. In the crime thriller Alpha Dog, he played the character Jake Mazursky and added glaucoma drops to his eyes to simulate the appearance of a drug addict in the film.

In 2007, he played cold-blooded killer and outlaw Charlie Prince in the Western film 3:10 to Yuma. In February 2013, he was cast to replace Shia LaBeouf in the Broadway play Orphans as his first theater performance. In May 2014, it was announced that he would star opposite Gillian Anderson and Vanessa Kirby in Benedict Andrews' new production of A Streetcar Named Desire at the Young Vic in London. The same production closed on September 19, 2014 and transferred to New York in 2016, opening at St. Ann's Warehouse in Brooklyn.

Foster played Lance Armstrong in the biopic The Program, and co-starred in the fantasy adventure Warcraft, released in June 2016. Also in 2016, Foster appeared in Hell or High Water as the dangerous Tanner Howard, opposite Chris Pine and Jeff Bridges. He reunited with director Barry Levinson to make The Survivor in 2021. In 2025, Foster played James V. Martin, the coach and abusive husband of boxer Christy Martin, in the biopic Christy. Sonia Rao of The Washington Post wrote that Foster "tries his best" to provide a nuanced portrayal of Martin but that his "efforts are thwarted by an uninspired script".

He is next set to play Evel Knievel in The Stunt Driver.

== Personal life ==
Foster was in a relationship with German actress Antje Traue, his co-star in the movie Pandorum. Traue moved to Los Angeles and lived with Foster until their relationship ended around 2010. In early 2012, Foster began a relationship with actress Robin Wright. They became engaged in early 2014, but called off their engagement in November 2014. Foster and Wright reconciled in early 2015. In August 2015, they announced they were ending their second engagement.

In October 2016, Foster announced his engagement to actress Laura Prepon. Prepon gave birth to their first child, a daughter, Ella, in August 2017. Foster and Prepon married in June 2018. Their son was born in February 2020. Foster filed for divorce from Prepon on November 12, 2024, citing “irreconcilable differences”.

After filming of the movie Here ended, five members of the cast and crew, including Foster, got tattooed with the letters T.I.A., which stand for "This is Armenia". Foster practices Transcendental Meditation.

== Acting credits ==
=== Film ===
Year	Title	Role	Notes
1996	Kounterfeit	Travis	
1999	Liberty Heights	Ben Kurtzman	
2001	Get Over It	Berke Landers	Nominated—Teen Choice Award for Choice Chemistry (shared with Kirsten Dunst)
2002	The Laramie Project	Aaron Kreifels	
2002	Big Trouble	Matt Arnold	
2002	Phone Booth	Big Q	Uncredited
2003	Northfork	Cod	
2003	11:14	Eddie	
2004	The Punisher	Spacker Dave	
2004	The Heart Is Deceitful Above All Things	Fleshy Boy	
2005	Hostage	Marshall "Mars" Krupcheck	
2006	Alpha Dog	Jake Mazursky	Young Hollywood Award for Breakthrough Performance—Male
2006	X-Men: The Last Stand	Warren Worthington III / Angel	
2007	3:10 to Yuma	Charlie Prince	Boston Society of Film Critics Award for Best Supporting Actor (2nd place); Central Ohio Film Critics Association Award for Best Supporting Actor (2nd place); Nominated—Saturn Award for Best Supporting Actor; Nominated—Satellite Award for Best Supporting Actor; Nominated—Screen Actors Guild Award for Outstanding Performance by a Cast in a Motion Picture
2007	30 Days of Night	The Stranger	
2008	Birds of America	Jay	
2009	The Messenger	Staff Sergeant Will Montgomery	Women Film Critics Circle Award for Best Actor; Nominated—San Diego Film Critics Society Award for Best Actor; Nominated—St. Louis Gateway Film Critics Association Award for Best Actor; Nominated—Gotham Independent Film Award for Breakthrough Actor
2009	Blink	AJ	Short film
2009	Pandorum	Bower	
2011	The Mechanic	Steve McKenna	
2011	Here	Will Shepard	
2011	360	Tyler	
2011	Rampart	Terry	Also producer
2012	Contraband	Sebastian Abney	
2013	North of South, West of East	Cass	
2013	Kill Your Darlings	William S. Burroughs	
2013	Ain't Them Bodies Saints	Patrick Wheeler	
2013	Lone Survivor	Matthew "Axe" Axelson	
2015	The Program	Lance Armstrong	Limited release
2016	The Finest Hours	Seaman Richard Livesey	
2016	Hell or High Water	Tanner Howard	Independent Spirit Award for Best Supporting Male; San Diego Film Critics Society Award for Best Supporting Actor; Washington D.C. Area Film Critics Association Award for Best Ensemble; Nominated—Critics' Choice Movie Award for Best Acting Ensemble; Nominated—Critics' Choice Movie Award for Best Supporting Actor; Nominated—Houston Film Critics Society for Best Supporting Actor; Nominated—Washington D.C. Area Film Critics Association Award for Best Supporting Actor
2016	Warcraft	Medivh	
2016	Inferno	Bertrand Zobrist	
2017	Rock'n Roll	Ben Foster	
2017	Hostiles	Sergeant Charles Wills	
2018	Leave No Trace	Will	
2018	Galveston	Roy Cady	
2021	The Survivor	Harry Haft	
2022	The Contractor	Mike	
2022	Hustle	Vince Merrick	
2022	Medieval	Jan Žižka	
2022	Emancipation	Fassel	
2023	Finestkind	Tom Eldridge	
2024	Sharp Corner	Josh McCall	
2024	King Ivory	George 'Smiley' Greene	
2025	Long Day's Journey into Night	Jamie Tyrone	
2025	Christy	James V. Martin	
2025	Motor City	Reynolds	
2026	The Stunt Driver	Evel Knievel	
TBA	The Stalemate †		Post-production; also executive producer
TBA	Cowboys †		Post-production
TBA	Viva La Madness †		Post-production

Key
†	Denotes films that have not yet been released

=== Television ===
Year	Title	Role	Notes
1996–1997	Flash Forward	Tucker "Tuck" James	Lead role; 26 episodes Nominated—Gemini Award for Best Performance in a Children's or Youth Program or Series (1997, 1998)
1998	You Wish	Earl	Episode: "Future Shock"
1998	I've Been Waiting for You	Charlie	Television film
1998	Breakfast with Einstein	Ryan	Television film
1999–2000	Freaks and Geeks	Eli	2 episodes
2000	Family Law	Jason Nelson	Episode: "A Mother's Son"
2001–2002	Boston Public	Max Warner	2 episodes
2002	Bang Bang You're Dead	Trevor Adams	Television film Daytime Emmy Award for Outstanding Performer in Children's Programming
2003–2005	Six Feet Under	Russell Corwin	22 episodes (1 uncredited); Screen Actors Guild Award for Outstanding Performance by an Ensemble in a Drama Series (2004); Nominated—Screen Actors Guild Award for Outstanding Performance by an Ensemble in a Drama Series (2005)
2005	The Dead Zone	Darren Foldes	Episode: "The Last Goodbye"
2007	My Name Is Earl	Glenn	2 episodes
2012	Robot Chicken	Orville Redenbacher / Man from the Vegetarian Future	Voice; episode: "Executed by the State"
2021	The Survivor	Harry Haft	Television film; also executive producer Nominated—Primetime Emmy Award for Outstanding Television Movie
TBA	Discretion		Upcoming series

=== Stage ===
Year	Title	Role	Venue	Notes
2013	Orphans	Treat	Gerald Schoenfeld Theatre	Broadway
2014	A Streetcar Named Desire	Stanley Kowalski	Young Vic	
