= Martin Scorsese Presents: The Saints =

American television series

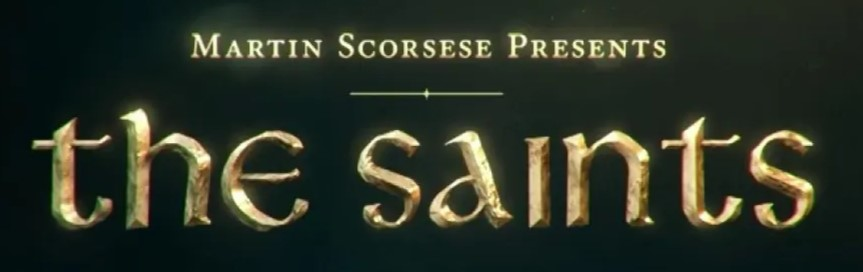
- Logo
- Genre: Docudrama
- Created by: Matti Leshem
- Written by: Kent Jones
- Directed by: Elizabeth Chomko
- Narrated by: Martin Scorsese
- Country of origin: United States
- Original language: English

Production
- Executive producers: Martin Scorsese; Matti Leshem; Julie Yorn; Rick Yorn; Christopher Donnelly; Yoshi Stone; Craig Piligian; Matt Loze; David Ellender
- Production companies: Lionsgate Alternative Television; Sikelia Productions; LBI Entertainment; Weimaraner Republic Pictures; Halcyon Studios

Original release
- Network: Fox Nation
- Release: November 17, 2024 – present

Martin Scorsese Presents: The Saints is a docudrama television series that premiered on Fox Nation on November 17, 2024. It is produced and narrated by American filmmaker Martin Scorsese and focuses on the lives of various Christian saints.

== Premise ==
The first season of Martin Scorsese Presents: The Saints devotes episodes to the lives of selected Christian saints: Joan of Arc, John the Baptist, Saint Sebastian, Maximilian Kolbe, Francis of Assisi, Moses the Black, and Mary Magdalene. The second season features episodes about Saint Patrick, Saint Peter, Thomas Becket, and Carlo Acutis.

Each episode is followed by a discussion program in which Scorsese, Catholic priest Fr. James Martin, writer Mary Karr, and writer Paul Elie discuss the saints and their lives.

== Cast ==
- Martin Scorsese as the narrator
- Liah O'Prey as Joan of Arc
- Dar Zuzovsky as Mary Magdalene
- Yahya Mahayni as John the Baptist
- Lorenzo de Moor as Sebastian
- Milivoje Obradović as Maximilian Kolbe
- Desmond Eastwood as Patrick
- Arthur Darvill as Thomas Beckett
- Bar Misochnik as Mary the Virgin
- Andrea Bellacicco as Pharisee

== Production ==
After Raging Bull in the early 1980s, Martin Scorsese considered quitting filmmaking, wanting to travel to Rome to shoot a series of television documentaries on the lives of different saints: "I literally thought it would be my last film," said Scorsese in 2016, referring to Raging Bull. "And at the time, because of the films that Bertolucci and the Tavianis and others had made for RAI, and in particular Roberto Rossellini's historical films, I thought that television was the future of cinema. Or, I should say: television mixed with cinema."

Scorsese intended to set the project up at RAI and explore the various questions of what it meant to be a saint, and where the figures came from. After the project fell apart, Scorsese channeled his spiritual interests into films such as The Last Temptation of Christ, Kundun, and Silence. Decades later, the series was revived when it was greenlit by Fox Nation.

The first four episodes were released on Fox Nation between November and December 2024. The next four episodes were released in April and May 2025. A second season, also consisting of eight episodes, was confirmed to be produced and aired in the 2025–2026 television season.
