= Lawrence Langer =

American scholar and Holocaust analyst (1929–2024)

- Born: Lawrence Lee Langer; June 20, 1929; New York City, U.S.
- Died: January 29, 2024 (aged 94); Wellesley, Massachusetts, U.S.
- Spouse: Sondra Weinstein (m. 1951)
- Children: 2

Academic background
- Education: City College of New York (BA); Harvard University (MA, PhD)

Academic work
- Discipline: Literary scholar
- Sub-discipline: Holocaust literature
- Institutions: University of Connecticut; Simmons College

Lawrence Lee Langer (June 20, 1929 – January 29, 2024) was an American scholar, Holocaust analyst, and professor of English and Holocaust education.

== Personal life ==
Lawrence Lee Langer was born to Irving and Esther (Strauss) Langer in the Bronx, New York in 1929. He received his BA from City College of New York in 1951 and an MA (1952) and PhD (1961) from Harvard University. He married Sondra Weinstein, in 1951, and together they had two children.

Langer died from rectal cancer at his home in Wellesley, Massachusetts, on January 29, 2024, at the age of 94.

== Work ==
=== Career beginnings ===
Langer began teaching at the University of Connecticut in 1957 and moved to Simmons College in Boston in 1958, where he remained until his retirement in 1992. His interest in the Holocaust began in 1963, after he received a Fulbright grant to teach American literature at the University of Graz in Austria. In May 1964 he drove with an American colleague through Czechoslovakia to Poland and spent two days at Auschwitz, inspecting the main camp (with several Soviet soldiers) and the remains of the killing facilities at Birkenau. After this trip, Langer began exploring the imaginative literature written about the concentration and death camp experiences. Upon his return to Simmons College he introduced a seminar on the Literature of Atrocity, versions of which he taught for the next 25 years. In 1968–69 he took a sabbatical year in Munich, Germany, where he completed his first book on Holocaust literature, The Holocaust and the Literary Imagination, which was published in 1976 and was a finalist for the National Book Award.

=== Career ===
In 1965, Langer became the first professor in the United States to teach a course on Holocaust literature, which he initially titled 'The Literature of Atrocity.' In 1976 he was awarded the Alumnae Endowed Chair, and in the Fall of 2002 he was the Strassler Distinguished Visiting Professor in the Center for Holocaust and Genocide Studies at Clark University. He was named Alumnae Chair Professor of English, emeritus.

A major theme in Langer's work over the years derived from his skepticism regarding efforts to deflect attention from the atrocities of the Holocaust by stressing the role of resistance and rescue in the ordeal of European Jewry. In his writing he understands and deplores the need to extract some positive meaning from a destructive event like the Holocaust, and argues that the impulse to learn something of value from the Holocaust experience may represent nothing more than an unconscious desire to avoid confronting its brutal realities. In Versions of Survival he established the idea of "choiceless choice" to describe the disintegration of moral reality for camp inmates and the general unprecedented situations of conflict that Jews found themselves in during the Holocaust. Additionally, he also developed the notion of an "afterdeath" of the Holocaust to accompany the "afterlife" that most survivors returned to with admirable resilience following liberation. His writing shares the essential historical reality of the Holocaust by describing the event as a story of mass murder, and challenges the belief that the Holocaust sanctifies the dignity of the human spirit.

In later years, Langer collaborated with the artist and child Holocaust survivor Samuel Bak in a series of volumes that combine critical commentary and interpretation with paintings whose vivid visual imagery seeks to challenge the difficult task of finding spiritual and intellectual comfort in a disordered Post-Holocaust world.

With the publication of Sexual Violence against Jewish Women during the Holocaust by Sonja Hedgepeth, CNN carried an article that included Langer stating "I have no doubt that some women were raped... [though] the significance [or rate] of rape is small," with Langer stating the low rate being due to the Nazi racial hygiene indoctrination, brothels in each concentration camp which 'aryan' women from the surrounding environs visited and the risk of typhoid and disease. Langer's statements and view, derived from testimony interviews, is supported by Lenore Weitzman and Myrna Goldenberg with all three contributing in various degrees, to the similar book Women in the Holocaust.

Langer's last publications were the books The Afterdeath of the Holocaust (2021), Hierarchy and Mutuality in Paradise Lost, Moby-Dick and The Brothers Karamazov (2022), and a compilation of his work with Bak, An Unimaginable Partnership: The Art of Samuel Bak and the Writings of Lawrence L. Langer (2022).

== Awards ==
Langer received an NEH Fellowship for Independent Studies and Research between 1978 and 1979. Between September and December 1996, he was the JB & Maurice Senior Scholar-in-Residence at the US Holocaust Research Center of the Holocaust Museum in Washington, DC. From September to December 1997, Lawrence L. Langer was named as a Koerner Fellow for the Study of the Holocaust, Oxford Center for Hebrew and Jewish Studies, Yarnton Manor, Oxford, England (1997). In May 2003, Langer served as the Resident Scholar at the Rockefeller Foundation Study and Conference Center in Bellagio, Italy. In 1996, Lawrence L. Langer was awarded the honorary degree, Doctor of Humane Letters from Simmons College, which he also received in 2000 from Hebrew Union College in Los Angeles and in 2002 from Ohio Wesleyan University.

In 2016, Langer received The Holocaust Educational Foundation's Distinguished Achievement Award in Holocaust Studies.

== Selected publications ==
- Hierarchy and Mutuality in Paradise Lost, Moby-Dick and The Brothers Karamazov (2022)
- An Unimaginable Partnership: The Art of Samuel Bak and the Writings of Lawrence L. Langer (2022)
- The Afterdeath of the Holocaust (2021)
- Told and Foretold: The Cup in the Art of Samuel Bak (2013)
- The Quest for Identity: Adam and Eve in the Art of Samuel Bak (2013)
- Return to Vilna in the Art of Samuel Bak (2007)
- Using and Abusing the Holocaust (2006)
- Samuel Bak: New Perceptions of Old Appearances (2005)
- In a Different Light: The Book of Genesis in the Art of Samuel Bak (2001)
- The Game Continues: Chess in the Art of Samuel Bak (1999)
- Preempting the Holocaust (1998)
- Landscapes of Jewish Experience: Paintings by Samuel Bak (1997)
- Art from the Ashes: A Holocaust Anthology (1995)
- Admitting the Holocaust: Collected Essays (1995)
- Holocaust Testimonies: The Ruins of Memory (1991) - winner of the 1991 National Book Critics Circle Award for Criticism
- Versions of Survival: The Holocaust and the Human Spirit (1982)
- The Age of Atrocity: Death in Modern Literature (1978)
- The Holocaust and the Literary Imagination (1976)
