= Greenhouse Academy =

American television series

- Genre: Drama
- Created by: Giora Chamizer
- Based on: Ha-Hamama by Giora Chamizer
- Starring: Ariel Mortman; Finn Roberts; Chris O'Neal; Dallas Hart; Cinthya Carmona; Grace Van Dien; Benjamin Papac; Jessica Amlee; BJ Mitchell; Parker Stevenson; Danika Yarosh; Dana Melanie
- Composer: Tal Yardeni
- Country of origin: United States
- Original language: English
- No. of seasons: 4
- No. of episodes: 40

Production
- Executive producers: Orly Atlas Katz; Udi Miron; Osnat Saraga; Tamara Rothenberg; Dominique Bazay
- Producer: Noam Arazi
- Production location: Israel
- Running time: 21–28 minutes
- Production company: Nutz Productions

Original release
- Network: Netflix
- Release: September 8, 2017 – March 20, 2020

Greenhouse Academy is a teen drama television series released by Netflix. Based on the Israeli television series The Greenhouse (Ha-Hamama), created by Giora Chamizer, the series was adapted for international audiences by Chamizer and Paula Yoo. The first season of the series was released on Netflix on September 8, 2017. The second season was released on Netflix on February 14, 2018, the third season was released on October 25, 2019, and the fourth season was released on March 20, 2020. In July 2020, it was announced that Greenhouse Academy had been canceled after four seasons.

== Premise ==
Eight months after losing their astronaut mother in a rocket explosion, brother and sister Alex and Hayley Woods enroll at a private boarding school for gifted future leaders. Separately, they join two competing houses within the school and become rivals. Soon, mysterious events draw the students from both houses into a top secret investigation. They uncover a deadly plot to use earthquakes for monetary gain. Only by joining forces and working together will they be able to stop this scheme.

== Cast ==
=== Main ===
- Ariel Mortman as Hayley Woods, a new student at Greenhouse Academy and a member of The Ravens
- Finn Roberts as Alex Woods, Hayley's younger brother and a member of the Eagles
- Chris O'Neal as Daniel Hayward, Ex-Captain of The Eagles
- Dallas Hart as Leo Cruz, Captain of The Ravens
- Cinthya Carmona as Sophie Cardona, Captain of The Eagles and Brooke's best friend
- Grace Van Dien (seasons 1–2) and Danika Yarosh (seasons 3-4) as Brooke Osmond, the dean's daughter and a member of The Eagles
- Maayan Blum as Marcus, groundskeeper of Greenhouse Academy
- Benjamin Papac as Max Miller, a member of The Ravens
- Jessica Amlee (seasons 1–2) as Jackie Sanders, a juvenile delinquent recruited in The Ravens
- BJ Mitchell as Parker Grant, a member of The Eagles and Daniel's best friend
- Aviv Buchler (seasons 1–2) and Dana Melanie (seasons 3-4) as Emma Geller, member of The Ravens
- Ishai Golan as FBI Agent Carter Woods, Hayley and Alex's father, who is still investigating his wife's death
- Selina Giles as Ryan Woods, Hayley and Alex's mother, a former astronaut who is presumed dead after a tragic accident
- Yiftach Mizrahi as Jason Osmond, Brooke's older brother
- Nitsan Levartovsky as Suzanne McGill, staff member at Greenhouse Academy
- Parker Stevenson as Louis Osmond, Jason and Brooke's father, founder and head of Greenhouse Academy
- Nadine Ellis as Judy Hayward (seasons 1–2), Daniel's mother
- Yuval Yanai as Eric Simmons, FBI agent and Carter's best friend
- Reina Hardesty as Aspen Fairchild (seasons 1–2), Leo's love interest, who is also a member of The Raven
- Rafael Cebrian as Enzo (seasons 3–4), Sophie's ex-boyfriend
- Michael Aloni as The Client, Jason's split-personality character

=== Recurring ===
- Efrat Dor as Michelle Wallace
- Natalie Berkowitz as Meredith
- Dean Gerber as Owen
- Jake Miller as Seth
- Stephanie Troyak as Tammy
- Amit Yagur as Becca Williams
- Zvika Fohrman as Coach Davies
- Jonathan Miller as Kyle
- Errol Trotman Harewood as David Diggs
- Iftach Ophir as Perry FBI Agent
- Aaron Kaplan as Brandon Thomas

== Production and release ==
Greenhouse Academy is a Netflix original series based on the Israeli tween-drama The Greenhouse (Ha-Hamama), which ran on Nickelodeon Israel. Both versions were created by Giora Chamizer and produced by Nutz Productions, a subsidiary of Ananey Communications. Two seasons consisting of a total of 24 episodes were produced. The series was filmed in summer 2016 in Tel Aviv and at other locations in Israel. The first season was released on Netflix on September 8, 2017. On January 18, 2018, the official Greenhouse Academy Instagram account announced that season 2 would be released on Netflix on February 14, 2018.

The series was "quietly" renewed for a third season in March 2018. In September 2018, the role of Brooke Osmond was recast with Danika Yarosh, after Grace Van Dien was cast in The Village which was picked up to series by NBC for the 2018–19 U.S. television season. Season 3 was released on Netflix on October 25, 2019. Season 4 was released on March 20, 2020.

== Episodes ==
Season	Episodes	Originally released
1	12	September 8, 2017
2	12	February 4, 2018
3	8	October 25, 2019
4	8	March 20, 2020

=== Season 1 (2017) ===
No. overall	No. in season	Title	Directed by	Written by	Original release date
1	1	"Pilot"	Roee Florentin	Giora Chamizer & Paula Yoo	September 8, 2017
Alex Woods applies to Greenhouse Academy to honor his mother's memory, a former student who is presumed dead. His sister Hayley drives Alex to Greenhouse Academy, where he proceeds to take both the written and the physical tests, but is sabotaged by the captain of The Eagles, whilst Hayley watches from the sidelines and meets Leo, captain of the Ravens. Louis Osmond, head of Greenhouse Academy, offers both siblings a place at Greenhouse: Alex in The Eagles, and Hayley in The Ravens.:) Guest starring: Tamir Ginsburg as Tyler Shaw, Dan Mor as Sergeant Archer
2	2	"The Opening Challenge"	Roee Florentin	Giora Chamizer & Paula Yoo	September 8, 2017
Though there is still tension between Alex and Daniel, Sophie, a member of the Eagles and writer for the official Greenhouse blog, befriends Alex. Meanwhile The Ravens are crowned winners of the Opening Challenge thanks to Leo and Hayley. At the Woods home, Carter has contacted his ex-colleague and FBI agent about a suspected break-in. It is revealed that a woman named Judy hired the intruder to delete all files on the Woods family computer that included her name.
3	3	"Breaking and Entering"	Roee Florentin	Giora Chamizer & Paula Yoo	September 8, 2017
The Eagles want revenge after losing the Opening Challenge, and convince Alex to steal a key from his sister to get into the Ravens' clubhouse and vandalize it. The FBI agent from the Woods home is seen at Greenhouse, searching for a Park Ranger's lost taser as part of a missing person's case. They suspect Jackie is behind the lost taser but she refuses to take the lie detector test to prove her innocence. The rest of the Ravens take the polygraph in support of Jackie.
4	4	"Private Screening"	Roee Florentin	Giora Chamizer & Paula Yoo	September 8, 2017
Jackie is cleared of any suspected crime after taking the polygraph. Daniel overhears the head of Greenhouse Academy, the Dean and the FBI agents discussing the missing taser, and rushes to the beach to dispose of the weapon, but Brooke follows him and sees him throw the taser into the ocean. Leo and Hayley realize Alex must have been the one who took Hayley's key. After confronting his brother, Hayley decides to leave Greenhouse Academy. At home, Hayley confronts her father about his current mindset, accusing him of being stuck in the past whilst he has himself and his children to care for. Leo visits Hayley at home and convinces her to return to the Academy.
5	5	"Black Smoke"	Roee Florentin	Giora Chamizer & Paula Yoo	September 8, 2017
After a basketball game, Daniel faints from an infection on his leg caused by a taser barb. Daniel wakes up in the hospital and reveals how he found the taser. Daniel begins the recovery process, but he is stripped of his position as captain of the Eagles. Guest starring: Dor Zweigenbaum as Dr. Schwartz
6	6	"Captain Material"	Roee Florentin	Giora Chamizer & Paula Yoo	September 8, 2017
Max's feelings towards Emma begin to develop after encouragement from Jackie. The Eagles vote for their new captain: Alex convinces Daniel that his best friend, Parker, would be a good choice as he can be easily manipulated, but Sophie also decides to run for the position. An FBI agent and Brooke begin separately investigating on the explosion that destroyed the taser barb.
7	7	"Swimming Lessons"	Roee Florentin	Giora Chamizer & Paula Yoo	September 8, 2017
Sophie and Parker compete in a debate to get the most votes while Daniel gives Parker some information he can use against Sophie in the debate. Judy convinces Jason to confine his father to let him go to the NASA shuttle launch instead of him.
8	8	"The Outsider"	Roee Florentin	Giora Chamizer & Paula Yoo	September 8, 2017
Sophie becomes the Eagles' new captain and Leo attends the satellite launch with Hayley. Jason brings down the satellite with Emma's help. Emma talks to Jason about the satellite after she realizes what she did. Guest starring: Omri Doron as JPL Security Guard
9	9	"Steph"	Roee Florentin	Giora Chamizer & Paula Yoo	September 8, 2017
Guest starring: Herzl Tobey as Park Ranger
10	10	"Guilt-Free Cupcakes"	Roee Florentin	Giora Chamizer & Paula Yoo	September 8, 2017
Guest starring: Herzl Tobey as Park Ranger
11	11	"Great Scott"	Roee Florentin	Giora Chamizer & Paula Yoo	September 8, 2017
12	12	"L.D.R."	Roee Florentin	Giora Chamizer & Paula Yoo	September 8, 2017

=== Season 2 (2018) ===
No. overall	No. in season	Title	Directed by	Written by	Original release date
13	1	"Escape Mechanism"	Roee Florentin	Giora Chamizer & Paula Yoo	February 14, 2018
14	2	"The Client"	Roee Florentin	Giora Chamizer & Paula Yoo	February 14, 2018
15	3	"A Day Off"	Roee Florentin	Giora Chamizer & Paula Yoo	February 14, 2018
16	4	"Meant to Be"	Roee Florentin	Giora Chamizer & Paula Yoo	February 14, 2018
17	5	"Surfing Lessons"	Roee Florentin	Giora Chamizer & Paula Yoo	February 14, 2018
18	6	"The Workshop"	Roee Florentin	Giora Chamizer & Paula Yoo	February 14, 2018
19	7	"The Spiral"	Roee Florentin	Giora Chamizer & Paula Yoo	February 14, 2018
20	8	"More Than a Hunch"	Roee Florentin	Giora Chamizer & Paula Yoo	February 14, 2018
21	9	"A Born Leader"	Roee Florentin	Giora Chamizer & Paula Yoo	February 14, 2018
22	10	"Kyle"	Roee Florentin	Giora Chamizer & Paula Yoo	February 14, 2018
23	11	"Bad Decisions"	Roee Florentin	Giora Chamizer & Paula Yoo	February 14, 2018
24	12	"Home"	Roee Florentin	Giora Chamizer & Paula Yoo	February 14, 2018

=== Season 3 (2019) ===
No. overall	No. in season	Title	Directed by	Written by	Original release date
25	1	"The Hike"	Roee Florentin	Giora Chamizer & Janae Bakken	October 25, 2019
26	2	"The Interrogation"	Roee Florentin	Giora Chamizer & Janae Bakken	October 25, 2019
27	3	"The Perfect Solution"	Roee Florentin	Giora Chamizer & Janae Bakken	October 25, 2019
28	4	"Your New Best Friend"	Roee Florentin	Giora Chamizer & Janae Bakken	October 25, 2019
29	5	"Old Trophies"	Roee Florentin	Giora Chamizer & Janae Bakken	October 25, 2019
30	6	"A Piece of Moon Rock"	Roee Florentin	Giora Chamizer & Janae Bakken	October 25, 2019
31	7	"The Hidden Flag"	Roee Florentin	Giora Chamizer & Janae Bakken	October 25, 2019
32	8	"The Beeps"	Roee Florentin	Giora Chamizer & Janae Bakken	October 25, 2019

=== Season 4 (2020) ===
No. overall	No. in season	Title	Directed by	Written by	Original release date
33	1	"Rock by Rock"	Roee Florentin	Janae Bakken and Giora Chamizer	March 20, 2020
34	2	"The Quick One"	Roee Florentin	Janae Bakken	March 20, 2020
35	3	"A Not Totally Bad Person"	Roee Florentin	Janae Bakken	March 20, 2020
36	4	"Gummy Bears"	Roee Florentin	Janae Bakken	March 20, 2020
37	5	"Cortinarius Orellanus"	Roee Florentin	Janae Bakken	March 20, 2020
38	6	"Hundred Percent"	Roee Florentin	Janae Bakken	March 20, 2020
39	7	"Room 205"	Roee Florentin	Janae Bakken	March 20, 2020
40	8	"The Client"	Roee Florentin	Janae Bakken	March 20, 2020
