= Giora Chamizer =

Israeli actor and writer (born 1971)

- גיורא חמיצר
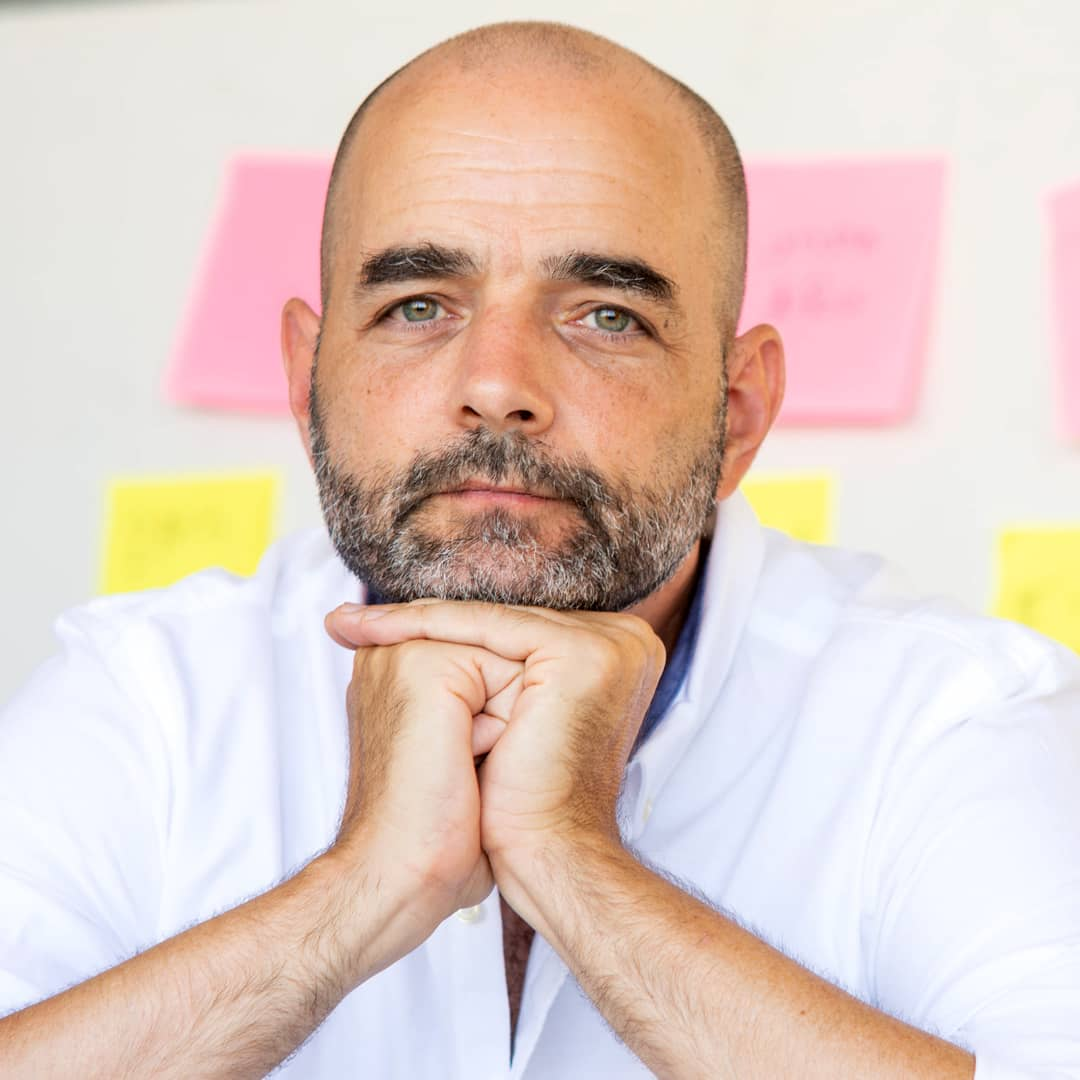
- Born: October 4, 1971 (age 54); Tel Aviv, Israel
- Occupations: Screenwriter television producer author
- Years active: 1993–present

Giora Chamizer (Hebrew: גיורא חמיצר; born October 4, 1971) is an Israeli screenwriter, television producer and author. He is known for creating many different Israeli drama television shows.

== Career ==
Chamizer joined Arutz HaYeladim (The Kids' Channel) in 1993, where he first created the format of the kids game show "Sheshtus" which ran successfully for 20 seasons.
In 2005, he began writing drama series for children. His first show, "The Eight" (165 episodes), about a group of gifted kids in a secret government project, became a huge cross-over hit which launched a new genre that became associated with Chamizer, of fast-paced, story driven dramas full of plot twists and cliff hangers.
In 2007 Chamizer created "The Island" (150 episodes), a sci-fi kids drama about time travellers in a post-apocalyptic world. Chamizer's third show, "The Greenhouse" (175 episodes), about a school for future leaders, was launched in 2012 and became one of the most viewed programmes in Israel's history.
In 2014 Chamizer created "The Hood" (150 episodes), about poor kids in a wealthy town. "The Hood" was also the first Israeli kids show to portray an LGBT affair.
In 2016, Netflix ordered an American remake for "The Greenhouse", and kept Chamizer as the head writer and show runner for the new show. "Greenhouse Academy" was filmed entirely in Israel, with an American cast, and launched in 190 countries over the world. The first season of the series was released on Netflix on September 8, 2017. So far, four Greenhouse Academy seasons have aired.

In April 2019, Chamizer wrote his debut book, "Ronny and Tom – The First Investigation". Two more "Ronny and Rom" books were published in 2020.

Chamizer's eighth original series. "Sky", which tells the story of a young female alien who crashes into Earth and morphs into the body of a teenage prom queen, is scheduled to air on Nickelodeon Israel in early 2021.

== Filmography ==
=== TV Series ===
- [[HaShminiya (The Eight)]] (creator and screenwriter 165 episodes, 2005–2007)
- The Island (The Timers) (creator and screenwriter – 150 episodes, 2007 – 2009)
- [[Ha-Hamama (The Greenhouse)]] (creator and screenwriter – 175 episodes 2012–2016)
- House Arrest (creator and screenwriter – 12 episodes 2009–2010)
- The Foxes (creator and screenwriter – 50 episodes 2009–2010)
- [[Shchuna (The Hood)]] (creator and screenwriter – 150 episodes 2014–2017)
- Greenhouse Academy (creator and screenwriter– 40 episodes, 2017 – 2019)

=== Game Shows ===
- [[Shestus (The Flying Class)]] (creator – 20 seasons 1993–2013)
- ChampionsNick (creator – 3 seasons 2016–2018)

== Awards ==
Chamizer won the "Writing for Children Series" category form the Israel Academy of Television Awards in September 2006. In addition, over the years his series won the Israeli Television Academy Award in additional categories. Among these awards were:

- "The Eight" – The Best Children and Youth Series award (2006–2007)
- "The Island" – The Best Children and Youth Series award (2008)
- "The Greenhouse" – The Best Children and Youth Series (2013, 2014 and 2015)
