= Prípad Barnabáš Kos =

- Directed by: Peter Solan
- Written by: Peter Karvaš and Albert Marenčin
- Cinematography: Tibor Biath
- Edited by: Maximilián Remeň
- Music by: Pavol Šimai
- Release date: 1964
- Running time: 88 minutes
- Country: Czechoslovakia

Prípad Barnabáš Kos (The Case of Barnabáš Kos) is a 1964 Czechoslovak film directed by Peter Solan. The film starred Josef Kemr.
