= The Greenhouse (TV series) =

- Also known as: החממה
- Genre: Teen drama
- Created by: Giora Chamizer
- Directed by: Roee Florentin (seasons 1-2); Oded Lotan (season 3); Rina Horn (season 3)
- Starring: Gaia Shalita-Katz; Joy Rieger; Lee Biran; Shir Moreno; Dar Zuzovsky; Daniel Litman; Eli Keren-Asaf; Lior Shabtai; Smadar Hayat; Tamir Ginzburg; Yadin Goldman; David Tetro; Raffi Tavor
- Country of origin: Israel
- Original language: Hebrew
- No. of seasons: 3
- No. of episodes: 175

Production
- Production locations: Sea of Galilee, Broadcast
- Running time: 23 minutes

Original release
- Network: Nickelodeon yes (Israel)
- Release: December 17, 2012 – February 28, 2016

The Greenhouse (Hebrew: החממה, Ha-Hamama) is an Israeli television series by Giora Chamizer. The series was created and aired in Israel in 2012 and was sold to Nickelodeon UK in 2013. It was adapted into the English-language series Greenhouse Academy for Netflix in 2017.

== Plot ==
=== Season 1 ===
In the Leadership School - "The Greenhouse", run by Louis Klein and his son Robbie Klein, is joined by the brothers Alfi and Ella-Lee Reshef, the children of Guri Reshef and Naomi Reshef; The first Israeli astronaut who was killed in a space accident. In the greenhouse there are two clubs; The ravens and vultures. The ravens Club deals with studies, education and music. The Vultures club are involved in sports when the center of interest in the Vultures Club is the basketball team where the boys play basketball and the girls cheer. Later in the season it is revealed that behind the school's pastoral appearance lurks a terrible plot, the two responsible for which are Judy Goren, Daniel's mother, the Vultures Club captain, and Zeev Neeman who actually works for a mysterious man called the 'client'. The students in the "greenhouse" feel that strange things are happening in their school and decide to investigate this together, while forming the "Galapagos" gang, they managed to thwart the plot of Zeev and Judy and at the same time experienced new loves and personal crises. At the end of the season it is revealed that Naomi Reshef is alive, and the one who saved her was Marcus who worked with Zeev and Judy to save Naomi and eventually sacrificed himself so that Zeev and Judy would fail in their plot. After Marcus dies a zeev and Judy Forcing Naomi into helping them. At the end of the season Zeev puts a bomb in the greenhouse and runs away, but Daniel and Yiftach, the captain of the ravens Club, manage to destroy the bomb in the pool in the cave next to the school, where Naomi was in a coma. Judy was eventually sent to prison for life and so was Eric, who collaborated with Zeev and Judy was sent to prison. Robbie Klein goes to jail for stealing the Israeli space agency's satellite, and the client's assistant, Nicole, shoots and kills Zeev. The Reshef family returns home and at the end of the season Ella-Lee is waiting for her new boyfriend.

=== Season 2 ===
After thwarting Zeev and Judy's plot, the Greenhouse students returned to normal. Sefi Shahal was appointed prime minister in place of Mordi. Sefi, who was expelled from the "GreenHouse" as a child, tries to oust Lewis from running the school, eventually following a police investigation Sefi manages to oust Lewis following a challenge in which several students were injured, including Sophie who admitted to investigating Lewis, and is replaced by Naomi Reshef, who moved into Lewis' house. In addition, the mysterious client blows orna the vehicle to create a distraction while his people replace the magnetite. When Orna was in the hospital, she was hypnotized by the client. At that time Ella-Lee hears beeps coming from Ruby's room, and she remembers hearing the same beep in the cave and wanted to go back there. She knew Judy's fingerprints could open the cave, She also knew that Yiftach's locker had the fingerprints and took them away without he’s noticing. Yiftach sees that the fingerprints are not in his locker and realizes that Ella Lee took them and so they cooperated. Natalie (Lewis' daughter) helps them and Daniel too. They found a secret room in Ruby's room that the room is also a control room that opens the cave. They planned for Daniel and Yiftach to enter the cave while Natalie and Ella-Lee would open it through the control room. Following these unexpected developments - Ella Lee came in with Yiftach instead of Daniel. The "client" is planning a new plot related to magnetite - to spread a virus (created during the heating of the magnetite with which Zeev and Judy tried to create an earthquake in the first season). The fact that Ella lee and Yiftach do not know is that the magnetite inside the cave so it turned out that they are both paralyzed because of the virus. At the same time - in a peace conference where all the world leaders are present and as a result - the client want to earn a lot of capital. The students of the "Greenhouse" felt the matter and tried to thwart the "plot" of the "client". At the same time as thwarting the conspiracy, the students of the "greenhouse" experienced new crises and new loves that affected them during this time as well. At the end of the season, they managed to thwart the client’s plot, which turns out to be Ruby's personality and escapes to an unknown place, and life in the "greenhouse" returns to normal.

=== Season 3 ===
The third season opens with the discovery of a new bomb named "Icarus" on which the scientist who created it, Dr. Ralph Eisenberg, has kept it. The plot of the first part of the season revolves around relations between Israel to Nubia, an Arab state in the kingdom of Bassem al-Sharif, who was assassinated by his brother, Rafik, who later turns Nubia into a dictatorship and threatens to detonate the Icarus bomb he received from Eisenberg in Israeli territory. At the end of this part of the season, Ella-Li, Daniel, his lost father Naftali and Omar al-Sharif, break into Nubia Palace with Omar's supporters, defeat Rafik and Omar is the king in his place. It turns out that Eisenberg is powered by Ruby, and that there are another 40 Icarus bombs. At the same time, the existence of the space agency project was revealed, to which Yiftach is accepted, but leaves during the season because he broke up with Ella-Lee and Ella-Lee stay in the project. In the second half of the third season, Eisenberg is poisoned and 16 secret Icarus bombs are stolen. Ruby seems to be responsible for all of this, but Eisenberg's operator turns out to Zeev, who escaped death at the end of the first season and took Ruby’s personally. During the season, Zeev drops an Icarus bomb on a plane flying by Sefi Shahal and Omar al-Sharif to wage a third world war, but fails. Zeev was arrested, but released and flown to Switzerland in exchange for all the Icarus bombs he stole. Later, it turns out that Zeev went to Switzerland to undergo plastic surgery that would make him look like Sefi, returned to Israel, replaced him and imprisoned him in the basement. Zeev, disguised as Sefi, decides that Ella-Li should Fly into space on a spacecraft called "Naomi Reshef" even though she retired from the space agency project, and deliver a historic speech, but his plot is to blow up the shuttle in the sky using Icarus bombs to blame Omar and create a conflict between Israel and Nubia. Finally, the Galapagos gang get on this plot and do everything they can to undo it. Sefi is released, and Zeev is killed by Daniel. Ella-Li gets on the ferry to launch it so that the Icarus bombs in it do not blow up the whole area and manages to be saved by getting out of the second ferry before it flies. In the End scene, the Ravens and Vultures Club arrive for the graduation ceremony, ending their final year in the greenhouse.

== Series overview ==
| Season | Episodes | Originally released | |
| Season | Episodes | First released | Last released |
|---|---|---|---|
| 1 | 50 | December 17, 2012 | May 26, 2013 |
| 2 | 50 | December 22, 2013 | April 8, 2014 |
| 3 | 75 | February 15, 2015 | February 28, 2016 |

== Characters ==
=== The Greenhouse Students ===
==== The Ravens House ====
- Gaia Shalita-Katz as Ella-Lee 'Lalee' Reshef
- Lee Biran as Yiftach Har-Lev
- Dar Zuzovsky as Natalie 'Net' Klein
- Joy Rieger as Dina Navon
- Lior Shabtai as Mattithiah 'Matti' Spivak
- Smadar Hayat as Alona Berger
- David Tetro as Emanuel 'Mano' Bloch (season 3)

==== The Vultures House ====
- Daniel Litman as Daniel Goren
- Yadin Goldman as Alfie Reshef (seasons 1-2, guest in season 3)
- Shir Moreno as Sophie 'Soph' Noyman
- Tamir Ginzburg as Ron Ashkenazi
- Eli Keren-Asaf as Amy Bloom
- Tzofit Emmanuel as Yuval Frishman (season 3)

=== The Greenhouse Staff ===
- Raffi Tavor as Lewis Klein
- Asaf Sheinberger as Robbie Klein
- Sharon Stark as Naomi Reshef
- Lana Ettinger as Orna (seasons 1-2)
- Roee Adar as Gershon
- Ran Appelberg as Marcus/Carlo Sheinberg (season 1)
- Liran David as Ozi (seasons 2-3)
- Yaron Brovinsky as Yishai Shalev (season 3)

=== Antagonists ===
- Sharon Alexander as Zeev Neeman (seasons 1&3)
- Adriano Jauvel as The Client (season 2)
- Mordi Gershon as Arik (season 1, guest in season 2)
- Doron Zafrir as Jeremy (season 2)
- Efrat Dor as Irene (season 3)

=== Other characters ===
- Amir Khoury as Omar Al-Sharif (season 3)
- Nati Kluger as Judy Goren (season 1, guest in seasons 2-3)
- Danny Geva as Guri Reshef
- Icho Avital as Boaz Tavor (season 1)
- Guy Loel as Mordecai 'Mordi' Rozen (season 1)
- Vered Feldman as Karin Pinto (seasons 2-3)
- Yigael Sachs as Sefi Shahal (seasons 2-3)
- Ayelet Robinson as Ruhama (seasons 2-3)
- Magi Azarzar as Miki Sivan
- Gaya Zarfati as Daria (season 3)
- Yarden Toussia-Cohen as Ofri (season 3)

== Broadcast ==
The first season of the series aired in the United Kingdom from January 6 to April 4, 2014.

== Adaptation ==
An American adaptation, titled Greenhouse Academy, premiered on Netflix in September 2017.
