= The Baker and the Beauty (Indian TV series) =

Indian web series

- Genre: Romantic comedy drama
- Based on: Beauty and the Baker by Assi Azar
- Directed by: Jonathan Edwards
- Starring: Santosh Sobhan; Tina Shilparaj; Venkat; Vishnu Priya; Rajiv Kumar Aneja
- Composer: Prashanth R Vihari
- Country of origin: India
- Original language: Telugu
- No. of seasons: 1
- No. of episodes: 10

Production
- Executive producer: Anand Reddy Karnati
- Producer: Supriya Yarlagadda
- Cinematography: Suresh Ragutu
- Editor: Nageswara Reddy Bonthala
- Running time: 30-45 minutes
- Production company: Annapurna Studios

Original release
- Network: Aha
- Release: 10 September 2021

The Baker and the Beauty is an Indian Telugu-language romantic comedy-drama web series directed by Jonathan Edwards. An adaptation of Israeli television series Beauty and the Baker, it is produced by Supriya Yarlagadda and stars Santosh Sobhan, Tina Shilparaj, Venkat, Rajiv Kumar Aneja and Vishnu Priya in the lead roles. Season 1 of the series was premiered on 10 September 2021 on Aha.

== Cast ==
- Santosh Sobhan as Vijay "Vijju" Krishna Dasaripalle
- Tina Shilparaj as Aira Vasireddy
- Venkat as Lakshmi
- Rajiv Kumar Aneja as Gogo Katyal
- Vishnu Priya as Maheswari
- Jhansi as Padma Dasaripalle, Vijay, Vikram, and Meera's mother
- Sai Swetha as Meera Dasaripalle, Vijay's younger sister
- Sangeeth Sobhan as Vikram Krishna Dasaripalle, Vijay's younger brother
- Srikanth Iyyengar as Venkateshwarlu Dasaripalle, Vijay, Vikram, and Meera's father
- Tarusha Saxena as Suseela Aunty
- Kamakshi Bhaskarla as Smrithi
- Pavani as Melissa D'Souza
- Sonakshi as Soumya
- Sai Kiran as Madhu
- Zainil as Kabir
- Avinash as Gourav
- Abhishek Maharshi as Govardhan
- Priyansha as Priya
- Siri Raasi as Divya
- Rakesh as Chanti

== Episodes ==
=== Season 1 ===
Episode	Title	Directed by	Date of Broadcast
1	"Wild-Mushroom Soup"	Jonathan Edwards	September 10, 2021
2	"Jubilee hills Superman"	Jonathan Edwards	September 10, 2021
3	"Aira's Fan Part 1"	Jonathan Edwards	September 10, 2021
4	"Aira's Fan Part 2"	Jonathan Edwards	September 10, 2021
5	"Festival of Lies"	Jonathan Edwards	September 10, 2021
6	"Over? Not Over!"	Jonathan Edwards	September 10, 2021
7	"Meet Vijay"	Jonathan Edwards	September 10, 2021
8	"Lakshmi Almighty"	Jonathan Edwards	September 10, 2021
9	"Goa here we come"	Jonathan Edwards	September 10, 2021
10	"The Finale"	Jonathan Edwards	September 10, 2021

== Reception ==
Sangeetha Devi Dundoo of The Hindu called it as a "faithful adaptation" of its original. She compared it with 2018 Telugu film Sammohanam and 1999 American film Notting Hill. Another citic of 123Telugu gave a rating of 3 out of 5 and wrote that "The Baker And The Beauty banks on the subtle emotions that are evoked through the unlikely love track between the lead pair. But the emotional connect subdues towards the end, which doesn’t help the cause. Nevertheless, the series can make for a decent one-time watch."
