= Chaim Machlev =

Tattoo artist

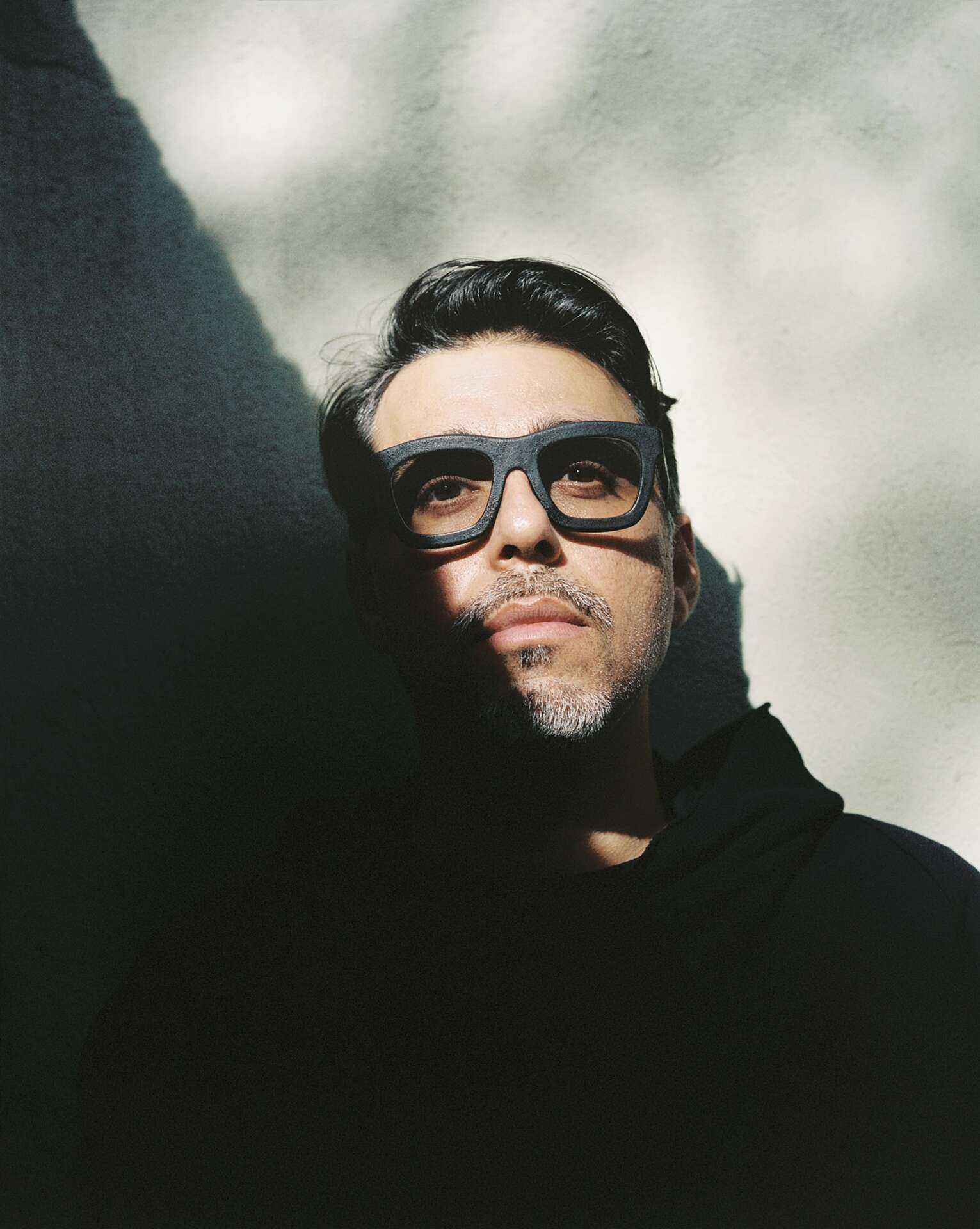
- Born: November 7, 1980 (age 45)
- Other names: DotsToLines
- Occupation: Tattoo artist
- Known for: Large-scale geometric line-based tattoos
- Website: dotstolines.com

Chaim Machlev (born November 7, 1980) is an Israeli-born German tattoo artist based in California, known professionally as DotsToLines. He is known for large-scale, line-based tattoos designed to follow the body’s contours. Machlev’s work has been featured in GQ and Elle India. His tattoos have also been exhibited in museums including the Museum of Contemporary Art of Rome and the Eretz Israel Museum.

== Early life and education ==
Machlev was born in Tel Aviv, Israel, and initially worked as a project manager in information technology. After receiving his first tattoo at age 30, he decided to leave his corporate career and pursue tattooing full-time. Machlev has stated that during a period of isolation in the desert he decided to leave his IT career and begin tattooing full-time, describing it as a personal turning point. In 2012 he relocated to Berlin and shortly after founded his studio, which became known for its focus on geometry and minimalism. Although he had no prior artistic background, his studies in computer science and psychology influenced the precision and structure of his designs, a personal transformation later documented in European tattoo publications such as La Veine Graphique and Forever More: The New Tattoo.

== Career ==
Machlev began tattooing in Berlin in 2012 and developed a minimalist, line-based style built on geometry and flow. Later that year he founded his private studio DotsToLines, where he tattoos one client per day, a working method he has described as focused and collaborative. In 2013 he won the TätowierMagazin Nachwuchscontest (Newcomer Contest) for emerging artists, gaining national attention in Germany. The following year Total Tattoo Magazine published the first extensive English-language profile of his work, describing his practice as combining mathematics and spirituality. A 2015 feature in Vangardist Magazine described Machlev as a leading tattoo artist in Berlin and highlighted his minimalist geometric style, his emphasis on personal connection, and his interest in the spiritual aspects of tattooing.

In 2016 Machlev’s work was included in the museum exhibition Tattoo Forever at the Museum of Contemporary Art of Rome, and that same year he launched Project 24, a 24-hour global tattoo charity event covered by airberlin Magazine. In 2017 he collaborated with Mercedes-Benz on the design of a special-edition GLA 200 d Peak Edition presented at the Bread & Butter by Zalando events in Berlin. Machlev’s design collaborations include projects with BMW and works that merge tattoo aesthetics with design and architecture. Among his clients are musicians such as Simon Gallup of The Cure and the members of the Scottish band Biffy Clyro, for whom he created a single interconnected geometric tattoo spanning the bodies of all three bandmates, symbolizing their unity as a musical family. Inked Magazine cited Machlev’s “blast-over” technique, layering new line work over existing tattoos, as seen in his piece for Machine Gun Kelly, as an example of stylistic innovation.

In recent years Machlev has expanded his practice to the United States, opening a private studio in Los Angeles while continuing to maintain his base in Berlin.

== Artistic style ==
Critics and tattoo publications have noted that Machlev’s approach involves creating geometric compositions that follow the client’s body shape. His compositions consist mainly of black lines and dots arranged in flowing patterns that emphasize anatomical movement rather than depicting external subjects.

Machlev has described his process as a meditative and collaborative experience, carried out in private one-on-one sessions that allow complete focus and trust between artist and client. This approach is consistent with descriptions in La Veine Graphique and The Tattoorialist, which portray his practice as an intimate spiritual exchange that merges geometry, anatomy, and mindfulness. Ink The Art of Tattoo further characterizes his aesthetic as merging mathematical structure with organic flow, resulting in large-scale compositions that appear both minimal and monumental.

Publications such as La Veine Graphique and Forever More: The New Tattoo describe his aesthetic as combining geometric precision with spiritual symbolism, using abstraction and symmetry as recurring elements. He cites nature, mathematics, and sacred geometry as core influences and often uses the entire body as a single composition, linking multiple tattoos through continuous line work. According to TTT: Tattoo and Tattoo & Religion, his method established a distinct visual and philosophical direction within contemporary tattooing that emphasizes harmony between art and anatomy.

== Exhibitions and recognition ==
Machlev’s work has been included in several museum exhibitions exploring tattooing as a contemporary art form. In 2016 he participated in Tattoo Forever at the Museum of Contemporary Art of Rome (MACRO), an institutional exhibition curated by Federica Nicosia and published by Gangemi Editore Spa. The same year his geometric line-art tattoos were featured in Tattoos: The Human Body as a Work of Art at the Eretz Israel Museum (MUZA) in Tel Aviv, curated by Yasmin Bergner. According to institutional press coverage, Tattoo Forever was recognized by BMW Group Italia as part of a broader cultural collaboration promoting tattooing as fine art. Also in 2016, Machlev organized and curated Project 24, a 24-hour global tattoo charity event held in Berlin and other cities, with proceeds donated to humanitarian causes. The event was featured in airberlin Magazine.

His inclusion in the museum exhibitions Tattoo Forever and Tattoos: The Human Body as a Work of Art is also noted in the book Tattoo Forever (Gangemi Editore Spa, 2016) and in Tattoo & Religion, which identifies him among contemporary artists redefining the medium as fine art.
