= Beauty and the Baker =

2013 Israeli TV series

- Hebrew: להיות איתה
- Genre: Romantic comedy
- Created by: Assi Azar
- Directed by: Oded Ruskin
- Starring: Aviv Alush; Rotem Sela; Mark Ivanir; Uri Gavriel; Hila Saada; Dar Zuzovsky; Ofer Haroun; Shani Aviv; Yaffa Levi; Nava Medina; Jason Lewis; Omar Sharif Jr.
- Country of origin: Israel
- Original language: Hebrew
- No. of seasons: 3
- No. of episodes: 24

Production
- Camera setup: Single-camera
- Running time: 30-32 minutes
- Production company: Endemol Israel for Keshet Broadcasting

Original release
- Network: Channel 2
- Release: November 23, 2013 – November 3, 2021

Related
- The Baker and the Beauty (US adaptation); The Baker and the Beauty (Indian adaptation)

The Baker and the Beauty (Hebrew: להיות איתה, romanized: Lihyot Ita, lit. 'Being with Her') is an Israeli romantic-comedy TV series that follows the love story between a simple baker and an international supermodel. It ranks as one of the highest-rated scripted series ever in Israel.

The series takes a comical approach to Jewish ethnic divisions in Israel by exploring the relationship between a privileged Ashkenazi Jewish woman and her working-class Mizrahi Jewish (Yemenite-Jewish) love interest.

Season two premiered on May 9, 2017.

== Plot summary ==
The worlds of the model and heiress Noa Hollander (Rotem Sela) and the baker Amos Dahari (Aviv Alush) collide when they meet on a night out in Tel Aviv.

In season one, they face challenges to staying together as Noa's ruthless agent Tzvika (Mark Ivanir) and Amos' ex-girlfriend Vanessa (Hila Saada) conspire to break the couple up.

In season two, further impediments to their happiness are created by Noa's father and his scheming assistant, Eden.

In 2021, in Israel, seasons 1 and 2 were edited into 2 mini-movies to remind people of the series and what had happened so far.

In season 3, there is a time jump of 3 years following the end of season 2.

It was confirmed in 2020 that season 3 would be 4 episodes long and would end the series.

== Cast ==
- Aviv Alush as Amos Dahari, a 29-year-old Mizrahi (Yemenite-Jewish) baker from Bat Yam. He is the brother of Merav and Assaf.
- Rotem Sela as Noa Hollander, an international supermodel and heiress from Tel Aviv.
- Mark Ivanir as Tzvika Granot, Noa's ruthless agent.
- Hila Saada as Vanessa Maimon, Amos's jealous ex-girlfriend.
- Dar Zuzovsky as Eden, Noa's father’s assistant (season 2).
- Ofer Hayoun as Assaf Dahari, Amos's brother and aspiring pop singer.
- Nava Medina as Amalia Dahari, Amos's attentive mother.
- Shani Aviv as Merav Dahari, Amos's teen sister.
- Uri Gavriel as Avi Dahari, Amos's easily irritated father.
- Yaffa Levi as Shosh, Amalia's best friend and neighbor.
- Jason Lewis as Pete Evans, a Hollywood actor and Noa's ex-boyfriend.
- Omar Sharif Jr. as George, a Hollywood agent from Lebanon.

== Reception ==
The series has been well-received by critics. Haaretz newspaper described it as "a great series" and that the "secret of the charm lies in the genre."

Perhaps the most popular and ancient genre (from “Daphnis and Chloe” to “The Taming of the Shrew,” not to mention “When Harry Met Sally...”), it’s the genre most lacking in Israeli culture throughout the generations."

In the United Kingdom where the series is broadcast on Channel 4, The Daily Telegraph praised the series, writing that "aside from being a hugely entertaining, frivolous romantic comedy on the surface, the show has a grittier side which will appeal to a British audience."

Walter Iuzzolino acquired the series for Walter Presents, a Channel 4 streaming service of foreign language TV drama and comedy. Iuzzolino spoke about the series to The Jewish Chronicle, "On the one hand, it's a shamelessly commercial piece, with all the classic ingredients of a typical love story. However, I think there's an honesty about it which really resonated with me. The underlying themes are sophisticated, particularly regarding the notion of family. She [Noa] lives in a vacuum of no relations and he lives surrounded by these noisy Sicilian types who I love! To me, it painted the portrait of a community and bonds that are really lovely. I think it gives the series a lot of [weight]."

== Production and broadcast history ==
The series was created by Assi Azar, who had Bar Refaeli in mind for the lead role. Rotem Sela took the role when Refaeli pulled out.

=== English subtitled version ===
An English subtitled version was released online on the Channel 4 website. On June 20, 2017, Amazon acquired global rights of the first two seasons of the show and streams them worldwide on Amazon Prime Video. As of October 9, 2021, the show was no longer available in the US on Amazon Prime Video. It was not clear where the show could be streamed from for viewers in the US.

== Adaptations ==
- On April 7, 2015 a Dutch adaptation premiered on Net 5 in The Netherlands. The show was called Bagels & Bubbels: zij hoort bij mij (Bagels and Bubbly: She's with me) and starred Bracha van Doesburgh as the supermodel Noa Hollander and Egbert Jan Weeber as baker Rick van Langeveld. The show was cancelled after one season and eight episodes.
- In November 2018, it was announced that an American adaptation of the series was being developed by Dean Georgaris and David Frankel through Keshet Studios and Universal Television for ABC. Georgaris and Frankel are set to write and direct, respectively, and both will executive produce alongside Avi Nir, Alon Shtruzman, Peter Traugott, and Rachel Kaplan. In January 2019, ABC ordered the adaptation to pilot. On May 11, 2019, ABC ordered the American titled The Baker and the Beauty to series for the 2019-2020 television season. The series premiered on April 13, 2020, and lasted a single season of nine episodes ending that June.
- In 2021, it was adapted by Jonathan Edwards as The Baker and the Beauty for the Indian Telugu-language version, with Supriya Yarlagadda producing it.
- In 2024, a French-language version was commissioned for France's TF1, with the French-Israeli singer, Amir Haddad cast as the lead.
