= David Kosse =

American film producer and executive

- Born: United States
- Known for: Film production
- Notable work: All Quiet on the Western Front, Three Billboards Outside Ebbing, Missouri

David Kosse is an American media executive, and has held senior leadership roles at Universal Pictures, Netflix, Film4 and STX Entertainment. He is known for building international film distribution divisions, including for Netflix, Universal and Momentum Pictures, and for his relationships with filmmakers. His film production credits include the Academy Award-winning films All Quiet on the Western Front and Three Billboards Outside Ebbing, Missouri. Since 2023, he has run Rockwood Pictures, a film and television development company he founded.

== Career ==
=== Early career ===
Kosse's early career included a stint as Vice President of Marketing at PolyGram Filmed Entertainment. In 2000, he left to set up Momentum Pictures, joining as Managing Director. During his tenure, key releases included the Oscar-nominated Amélie and Lost in Translation.

=== Universal Pictures International ===
Kosse left to join Universal Pictures in 2003, and was appointed president in 2009, a role he held until 2014. He started and built Universal Pictures International into an operation based in 16 countries, grossing over $2 billion at the box office in 2014. Successful film releases under his tenure as president included Mamma Mia!, the Bourne films and Les Miserables, and acquisitions included The Wolf of Wall Street. Kosse left Universal in 2014 when it relocated the role of head of international theatrical operations from London to Los Angeles, opting to remain in London.

=== Film4 ===
In November 2014, Kosse joined Film4 as director of its feature film division. During his time in the role, Film4 enjoyed its most successful awards season, with a record 15 Oscar nominations in 2015 which included Carol, Room, Ex Machina, 45 Years, Youth and Amy.

=== Netflix ===
In March 2019, it was announced that Kosse would join Netflix as vice president of international film, and was tasked to build the service’s international film offerings in Europe, Middle East and Africa "from ground zero." During his tenure, Netflix films greenlit include the Oscar-nominated filmThe Hand of God, Blood Red Sky, and All Quiet on the Western Front. In December 2021, Kosse featured in Variety500, an index of the 500 most influential business leaders shaping the global media industry. He departed Netflix in September 2022.

=== Rockwood Pictures ===
Kosse has not revealed details of his work at Rockwood Pictures, but previously indicated he intended to start a new company with a view to producing European films with wide appeal. In 2024, Rockwood Pictures entered into a development deal with Amazon Prime Video UK.

== Personal life ==
Kosse has lived in London since 1997.

== Filmography ==
=== As executive producer ===
#	Title	Year
1	Wondrous Oblivion (co-executive producer)	2003
2	Things to Do Before You're 30	2005
3	The Theory of Everything	2014
4	Youth (co-producer)	2015
5	Room	2015
6	American Honey	2016
7	Una	2016
8	Free Fire	2016
9	Trespass Against Us	2016
10	The Oath	2016
11	Billy Lynn's Long Halftime Walk (associate producer)	2016
12	Beast (short)	2017
13	How to Talk to Girls at Parties	2017
14	The Killing of a Sacred Deer	2017
15	Lean on Pete	2017
16	Three Billboards Outside Ebbing, Missouri	2017
17	Beast	2017
18	Journeyman	2017
19	American Animals	2017
20	Adrift	2018
21	Old Boys	2018
22	Fighting with My Family	2019
23	The Day Shall Come	2019
24	The Red Sea Diving Resort	2019
25	Peaky Blinders: The Immortal Man	2026
26	The Runner	2026

=== As additional crew ===
#	Title	Year
1	All Is Lost (distribution partner: Universal Pictures International team)	2013

=== Thanks ===
#	Title	Year
1	Everest (the producers and director like to thank)	2015
2	The Favourite (special thanks)	2018
3	The Red Sea Diving Resort (the producers wish to thank)	2019
4	Blood Red Sky (the producers and director like to thank)	2021
