= The Boxer and Death =

1962 film

- Directed by: Peter Solan
- Written by: Jozef Hen; Tibor Vichta; Peter Solan
- Starring: Stefan Kvietik; Manfred Krug; Gerhard Rachold
- Production companies: Studio Hranych Filmov, Bratislava
- Release date: 1962
- Running time: 107 minutes
- Country: Czechoslovakia

The Boxer and Death (Slovak: Boxer a smrť) is a 1962 Slovak film directed by Peter Solan. The film is based on the life of Polish boxer Tadeusz "Teddy" Pietrzykowski, but in the film the boxer's name is Ján Komínek. It stars Štefan Kvietik and Manfred Krug, and was based on a Polish novel by Jozef Hen.
