= Choiceless choices =

"Choiceless choices" is a term coined by Lawrence Langer in his 1982 book Versions of Survival: The Holocaust and the Human Spirit, to describe the no-win situations faced by Jews during the Holocaust.
