= Tomer Peretz =

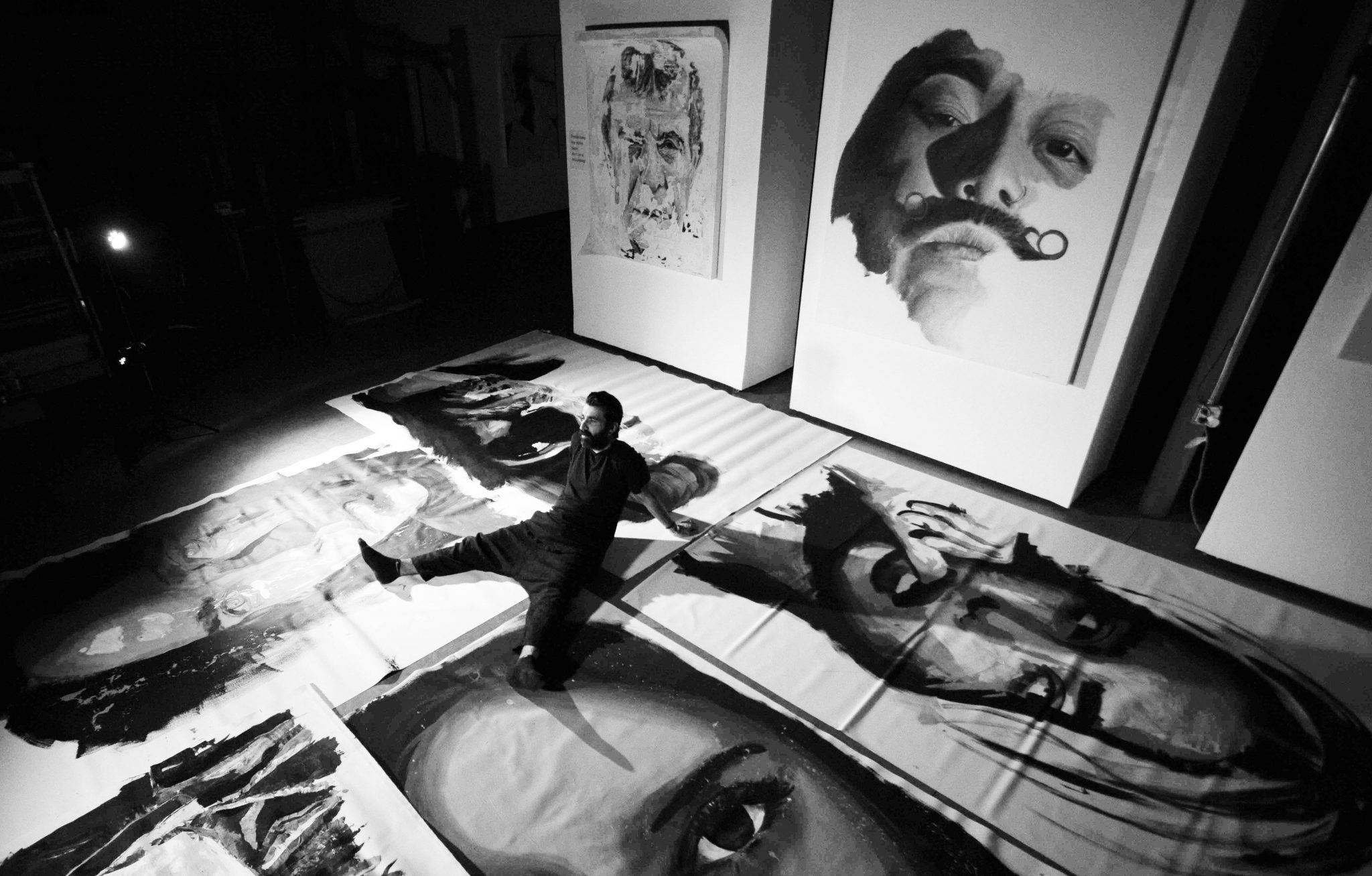
- Artist Tomer Peretz and his piece 'Funeral' at an art exhibit 2012.
- Born: Tomer Peretz; 1982 (age 43–44)
- Occupation: Artist
- Years active: 2001 - present
- Known for: Oil Paintings, Artist, Fashion Designer

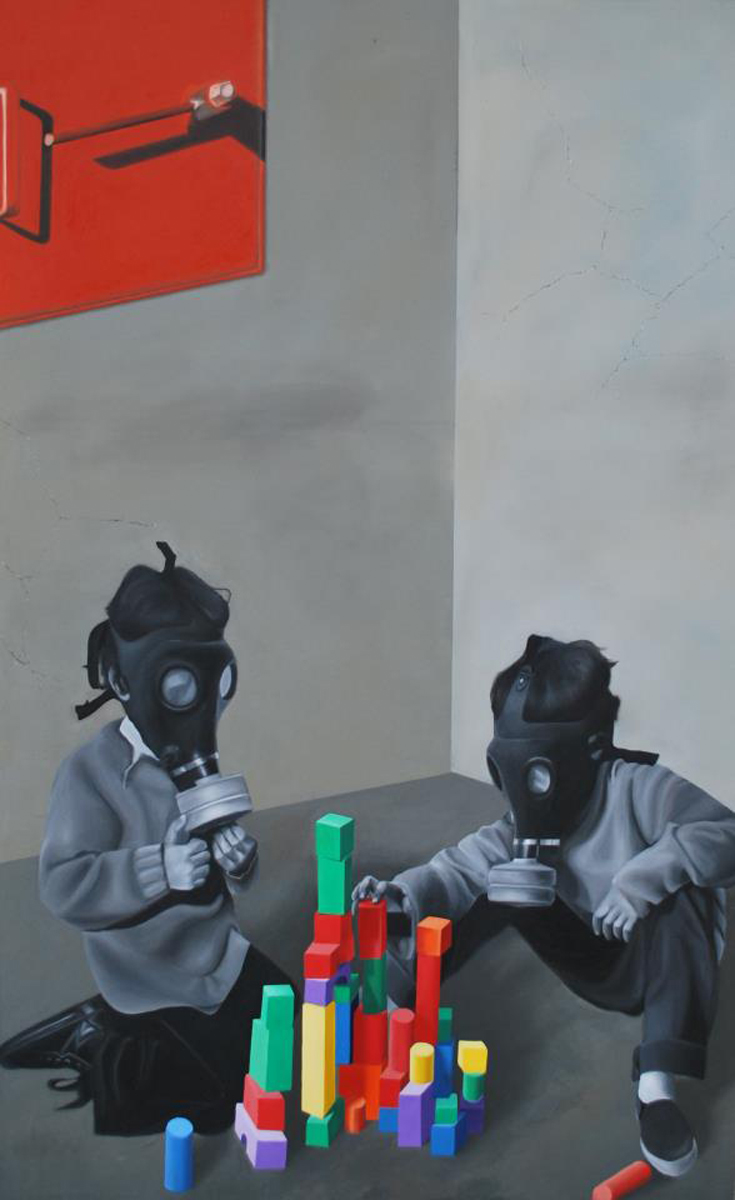
"Play Time at the Gulf War".

Tomer Peretz (Hebrew: תומר פרץ; born 1982) is a Los Angeles–based Israeli conceptual artist and painter. An artist since his early childhood in Jerusalem, Peretz utilizes a spectrum of platforms, including oil and acrylic painting, photography, and conceptual art, to express his unique and contemporary point of view. With an appreciation for realism, surrealism and the unknown, his breadth of work spans across contemporary and figurative art. Every piece highlights an underlying theme, element of mystery and more than meets the eye. His work is inspired by stories and people that have impacted his life. A philanthropist and visionary, his art and installations serve to highlight his passions and beliefs and have helped raise money for philanthropic causes he strongly resonates with.

== Professional career ==
Peretz is currently represented by the reputable gallerist Giancarlo Pedrazzini in the 'Fabbrica Eos' gallery in Milan, Italy. Peretz's artwork has been showcased in galleries in Los Angeles, Las Vegas, Israel and throughout Europe. Peretz's work includes controversial issues regarding Middle East affairs and specifically the Israeli–Palestinian conflict; depicting his own personal experience as an officer serving in the Israel Defense Forces. In 2014, Peretz was awarded the inaugural Arthur Szyk Prize for Disruptive Thought. Peretz's art has been showcased at Art Basel, Miami. His 2012 opening exhibition "Unbreakable" featured 25 large-scale paintings and collected artifacts at the Bruce Lurie Gallery in Culver City, Calif. Peretz has received many private portrait commissions from A-list celebrities across the globe and custom requests from some of the entertainment industry's top artists. Peretz's work has been displayed in multiple shows, including "It's Halloween at Very Venice Art and Design Gallery" in October 2011; "For the Love of Art" at Tokyo Ice in December 2009; and "Amit Apel Design Studio Gallery Opening" in Los Angeles in May 2009.

His work was also featured at a benefit in partnership with another organization where 100% of the proceeds were given to a charity for children with cancer and their families at Beit Haitonaim.

In December 2019 Tomer painted the logo for the Venice, California based film company; Concordia studio and is featured creating it in the beginning of every movie. The studio is backed by Billionaire Laurene Powell Jobs alongside Oscar-winning director Davis Guggenheim. One of Concordia studio's films is "Kailash", which was honored at the Sundance Film Festival.

As a way to honor and celebrate the sacrifices healthcare workers and their families endure during the COVID-19 crisis, the Israeli American Council generously gifted Peretz's 'Hero' to the Albert Einstein College of Medicine and Montefiore Medical Center. In this monochromatic painting, Peretz portrays a healthcare worker during the COVID-19 pandemic in honor of Montefiore's healthcare heroes.

== 15 Minutes ==
On April 18, 2020, Tomer Peretz began a new body of work on Instagram Live. World leaders had recently implemented public health policies to slow the rapid spread of COVID-19, and despite their importance in mitigating the impact of the pandemic, the restrictions were emotionally challenging for many. In an attempt to uplift his community, Peretz invited his followers to join him remotely in his new project. The objective was to have a conversation with his friends (often celebrities) as he painted their portrait onto a 10 foot canvas within a 15-minute timeframe. Peretz has collaborated with numerous artists, including Gene Simmons of KISS, Jonathan Davis of Korn, Dotstolines, Inbar Lavi, Karim Rashid, Alejandro Edda, Magnus Walker and more.

== Welcome To America ==
In June 2021, Tomer introduced an art exhibition about society and the reality of the world we live in today. The exhibition currently comprises 2 volumes and is in the works for volume 3. Welcome to America volume 1 was an 11,000 sq ft two part show featuring original artworks, installations, and performances in the heart of Downtown LA. The show began on the first floor where guests were viewing Tomer's collection inspired through his years of living in America to then experience the unanticipated on the second floor. Materiality today is shown through the eyes of the artist where guests unexpectedly were a part of a shocking, provocative, mind-blowing live performance.

Welcome to America Volume 2 was an exclusive art show by artist Tomer Peretz where he showcased his most recent work ("Welcome to America" and "Incomplete"). The paintings displayed in the gallery involve emotional power through conceptual experiences, and Peretz's views on society. Following his journey as he evolved from an underground artist to his launch to go public. His breadth of work spans across contemporary and performance art, highlighting concepts like realism, surrealism.

== NFT career ==
In 2022, Tomer Peretz began working with NFTs, combining digital art with his existing artistic practice. He participated in NFT platforms, events, collections, and collaborations while continuing to produce traditional artworks. His work expanded to include both physical and digital media.

In March 2022 Tomer dropped his first NFT Collection called “Gonna Make Some Bad Choices Tonight”. Followings it's success 252 editions were released in less than a week. Tomer created a community for his art that allowed members to have access to exclusive shows, pieces and more. Along with his NFT drop, he had a private show at his very own Downtown Los Angeles gallery that over 500 members showed. Only those who were holders of the Gonna Make Some Bad Choices Tonight NFT had access to a secret showing on the 4th floor of his building.

In May 2022, Tomer dropped his second NFT called “Facing Bad Choices” where he sold all 4 of his pieces on Opensea in less than 5 minutes. The inspiration stems from his success from his first NFT drop and inspired him to make “Facing Bad Choices”. In June 2022, Tomer collaborated with artists, Val Kilmer and Laurence Fuller for his third NFT drop called “My Number”. This unique piece was created amongst three incredible artists on Superare and is going for 10 ETH. Also in June 2022, along with his third NFT he dropped his fourth NFT on Opensea called “Bad Choices”. There are 31 pieces of this NFT sold for 0.19 ETH.

== Fashion ==
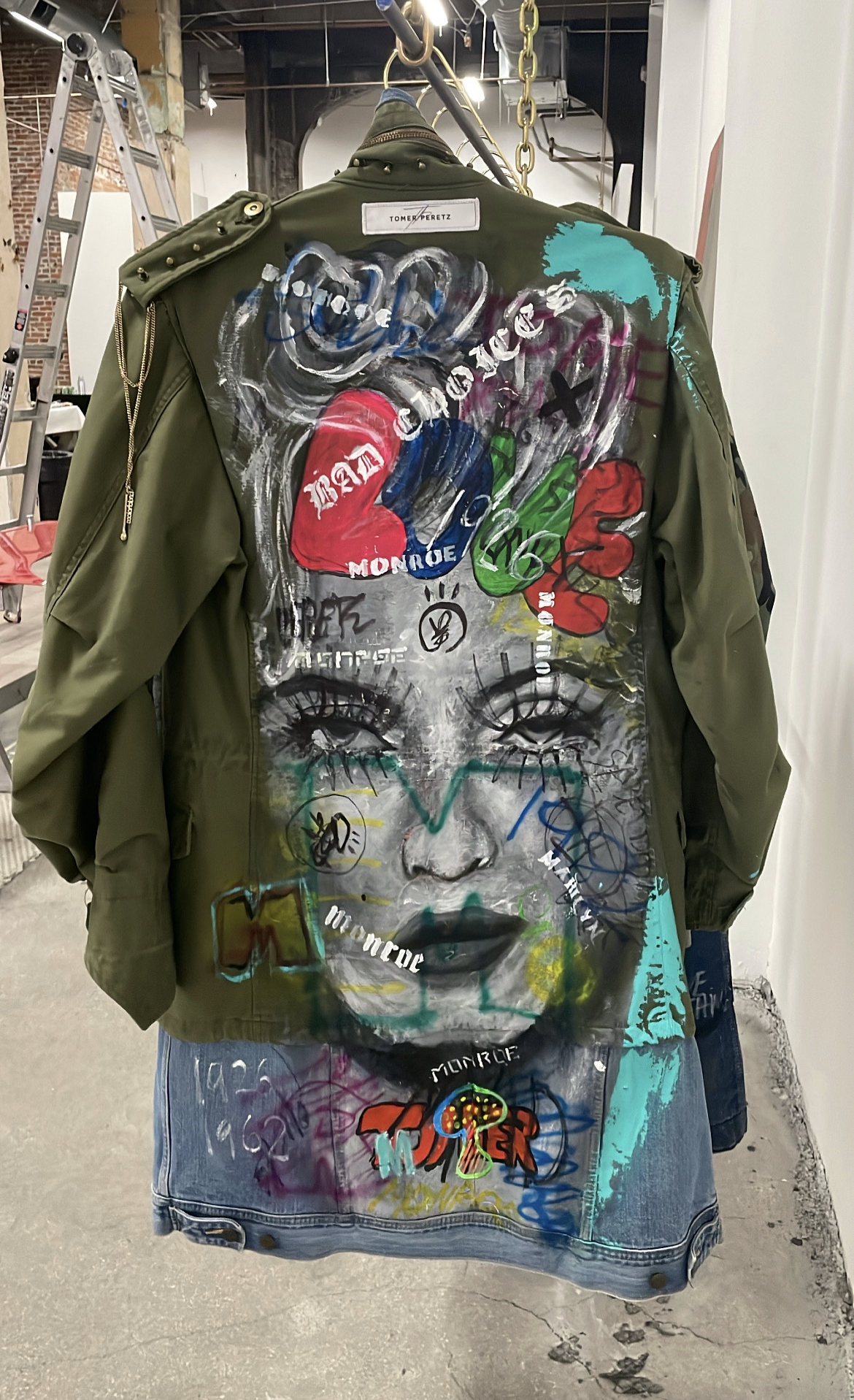
"War is Over" one-of-one piece

On February 1, Peretz launched a limited fashion collection called “War Is Over,” featuring one-of-one repurposed military jackets with a crypto element.

Peretz seeks to use a combination of art and technology to tell a story of and spread a message of peace. His “War is Over” line of repurposed military jackets includes state-of-the-art technology in the form of scannable chips that identify each jacket as authentic and one-of-a-kind. The art on each jacket is personalized and impossible to replicate.

A pinnacle point in Peretz’s life was serving in the Israeli Military in multiple locations around the Middle East, which inspired this latest collection. Through the transformative process of repurposing military garments and incorporating his art, the artist imbues them with a new, symbolic meaning - one of peace and the end of war. These modified jackets manifest Tomer’s vision, transcending their original purpose to embody his ideals.

Each piece is hand designed by the Israeli artist and can be scanned to verify the work as an NFT. Using smartphones, consumers can scan and access the jacket’s information, including the narrative behind the piece, the materials, its inherent value, and photos of the jacket itself. This also verifies the authenticity and tracks the jacket’s history as it is passed on to others.

The jackets in this collection features an extension of wool or denim that has been used on other jackets in the past, both inside and outside the jacket. This adds an extra layer of warmth and style to the jacket, making it perfect for colder weather. To add an extra touch of personality to these jackets, the artist has also added studs, adding a touch of edgy style to the military aesthetic.

Every jacket is unique with no duplicates in existence. The crafted pieces are designed to help consumers escape fast fashion. This collection intends to create a cross-section between streetwear and technology, and to tell a story.

== ZAKA Volunteer ==
Tomer was in Israel during the horrible massacre of October 7 carried out by the Palestinian Islamic terrorist organization Hamas. After leaving his 2 young sons with their grandparents in Jerusalem, he volunteered to help ZAKA clear the bodies out of Kibbutz Be'eri. He volunteered for 3 days removing the victims of the Palestinian massacre from their homes and safe room. The scenes he saw during those 3 days haunt Tomer and has effected his ability to work and socialize with people. He was very hurt by the fact that many of his colleagues and friends remained and still remain silent over the atrocities that Hamas and other Palestinians carried out on innocent women, children, elderly and men. He testified to the USC Shoah foundation about his experience in Israel and his volunteer work with ZAKA
