= The Champion (2020 film) =

Polish sports drama film

- Directed by: Maciej Barczewski
- Written by: Maciej Barczewski
- Produced by: Krzysztof Szpetmański; Leszek Starzyński
- Starring: Marianna Pawlisz; Piotr Głowacki; Grzegorz Małecki; Marcin Bosak
- Cinematography: Witold Płóciennik
- Edited by: Leszek Starzyński
- Music by: Bartosz Chajdecki
- Production company: Iron Films
- Distributed by: Galapagos Films
- Release date: 8 December 2020 (Gdynia Polish Film Festival)
- Country: Poland
- Languages: Polish; German
- Box office: $43,663

The Champion (Polish: Mistrz, lit. "The Master"), released in some English-speaking countries as The Champion of Auschwitz, is a 2020 Polish sports drama film written and directed by Maciej Barczewski. It stars Piotr Głowacki as Tadeusz Pietrzykowski, a real-life Polish boxer who became famous for his nearly undefeated strings of victories in the Nazi Germany concentration camps. The film also stars Rafal Zawierucha, Marcin Czarnik and Marian Dziedziel. The music was composed by Bartosz Chajdecki. This is the first full-length movie directed by Barczewski.

The film premiered at the Gdynia Polish Film Festival on 8 December 2020.

The Champion is notable for being the first film for which a foreign-language version (in English) was created in which the actors' facial movements are modified so that they appear to be speaking that language. The work was done using a technology similar to deepfake, proprietary to the Tel Aviv-based tech startup Adapt Entertainment, which bought the English-language distribution rights for The Champion so that it could serve as a proof of concept for its technology.

== Plot ==
The movie tells the story of Tadeusz Pietrzykowski, a real-life Polish boxer who became famous for his nearly undefeated strings of victories in the Nazi Germany concentration camps.

== Development ==
The film was announced in 2019. The shooting finished in January 2020. The movie was initially scheduled for release for 16 October 2020 but has been delayed with the new release date given as March 2021. The delay was likely caused by the impact of the COVID-19 pandemic on the Polish cinemas.

== Cast ==
- Piotr Glowacki as Tadeusz Pietrzykowski
- Rafal Zawierucha as Klimko
- Marcin Czarnik as Bruno
- Marian Dziedziel
- Martin Hugh Henley as Officer from Neuengamme
- Marcin Bosak as Lagerführer
- Piotr Witkowski as Walter
- Grzegorz Malecki as Rapportführer
- Lukasz Szoblik as Bumbo

== English-language version ==
The Tel Aviv-based startup Adapt Entertainment is based around proprietary machine learning process, named Plato, that uses AI to modify actors' faces within film and television shows in order to make it appear that those actors are speaking another language, as a substitute for dubbing. The software is similar to but distinct from deepfake technology. The company bought the English-language distribution rights to The Champion at the 2021 Cannes Film Festival for $100,000, after the film had seen financial success in Poland, as a proof of concept for its process. They then hired much of the film's original cast to be filmed at a studio speaking the film's dialogue in English, and used the resulting audio, as well as a combination of the old and new footage as training material, to infer the characters' facial movements to match the new dialogue.

Director Barczewski was supportive of the new version, saying he had wanted to additionally film The Champion in English but could not afford to do it.
