= The Survivor (2021 film) =

2021 Canada-US biographical drama film

- Release poster
- Directed by: Barry Levinson
- Written by: Justine Juel Gillmer
- Produced by: Aaron L. Gilbert; Matti Leshem; Barry Levinson; Scott Pardo; Jason Sosnoff
- Starring: Ben Foster; Vicky Krieps; Billy Magnussen; Peter Sarsgaard; John Leguizamo; Danny DeVito
- Cinematography: George Steel
- Edited by: Douglas Crise
- Music by: Hans Zimmer
- Production companies: Bron Studios; New Mandate Films; Creative Wealth Media; Endeavor Content; USC Shoah Foundation
- Distributed by: HBO Films
- Release dates: September 13, 2021 (TIFF); April 27, 2022 (United States)
- Running time: 129 minutes
- Countries: Canada; United States
- Language: English

The Survivor is a 2021 biographical drama film directed by Barry Levinson from a screenplay by Justine Juel Gillmer. Ben Foster stars as Harry Haft, a real-life survivor of the Nazi Germany Auschwitz concentration camp, where he boxed fellow inmates to survive. Vicky Krieps, Billy Magnussen, Peter Sarsgaard, John Leguizamo, and Danny DeVito co-star. The film had its world premiere at the Toronto International Film Festival in September 2021, and was released on HBO on April 27, 2022. The film received positive reviews from critics, particularly for Foster's lead performance. The film was Emmy nominated for Outstanding Television Movie.

== Cast ==
- Ben Foster as Harry Haft
- Vicky Krieps as Miriam Wofsoniker
- Billy Magnussen as Schneider
- Peter Sarsgaard as Emory Anderson
- Dar Zuzovsky as Leah Krichinsky
- John Leguizamo as Bill "Pepé" Miller
- Danny DeVito as Charley Goldman
- Saro Emirze as Peretz Haft
- Laurent Papot as Jean
- Paul Bates as Louis Barclay
- Sonya Cullingford as Else
- Michael Epp as SS Kuttner
- Charles Brice as Coley Wallace
- Aaron Serotsky as Michael Lieberman

== Production ==
In November 2018, it was announced that Ben Foster had joined the cast of the film, along with Barry Levinson, who was supposed to direct the film from a screenplay by Justine Juel Gillmer, with Matti Leshem, Aaron L. Gilbert, Jason Sosnoff, Levinson and Scott Pardo producing under their New Mandate, Bron Studios and Creative Wealth Media banners, respectively. In March 2019, Billy Magnussen, Danny DeVito, Vicky Krieps, Peter Sarsgaard, Dar Zuzovsky and John Leguizamo joined the cast of the film. Hans Zimmer composed the film's score. The film was re-titled The Survivor from the working title, Harry Haft. Principal photography began in February 2019.

In order to portray Harry Haft at Auschwitz, Ben Foster lost 62 pounds before filming commenced. Once those scenes were completed, production went on hiatus for five weeks so Foster could regain 50 pounds to shoot the remainder of the film.

== Release ==
The Survivor had its world premiere at the 2021 Toronto International Film Festival on September 13. In October 2021, HBO Films acquired North American distribution rights to the film. The film debuted on HBO and HBO Max on April 27, 2022.

== Reception ==
On the review aggregator website Rotten Tomatoes, 86% of 69 critics' reviews are positive, with an average rating of 7.1/10. The website's consensus reads: "Ben Foster's gripping work in the central role further elevates The Survivor's affectingly character-driven approach to its weighty themes." Metacritic, which uses a weighted average, assigned the film a score of 71 out of 100, based on 16 critics, indicating "generally favorable" reviews.

== Accolades ==
| Year | Award | Category | Nominee(s) | Result | Ref. |
|---|---|---|---|---|---|
| 2022 | Hollywood Critics Association Awards | Best Broadcast Network or Cable Live-Action Television Movie | The Survivor | Won | |
| 2022 | Hollywood Critics Association Awards | Best Actor in a Broadcast Network or Cable Limited or Anthology Series | Ben Foster | Nominated | |
| 2022 | Hollywood Critics Association Awards | Best Directing in a Broadcast Network or Cable Limited or Anthology Series | Barry Levinson | Nominated | |
| 2022 | Primetime Emmy Awards | Outstanding Television Movie | Ben Foster, Matti Leshem, Aaron L. Gilbert, Barry Levinson, Jason Sosnoff, and Scott Pardo | Nominated | |
| 2023 | Critics' Choice Awards | Best Movie Made for Television | The Survivor | Nominated | |
| 2023 | Satellite Awards | Best Motion Picture Made for Television | The Survivor | Nominated | |
