= Peter Solan (director) =

Slovak film director (1929–2013)

Peter Solan (25 April 1929 – 21 September 2013) was a Slovak film director and documentarian. He is considered part of the Czech New Wave movement.

== Biography ==
Solan was born in Banská Bystrica. He graduated from the Prague Film Academy of Performing Arts in 1953. He was given the Igric Award for Lifetime Achievement in 1994, and in 2004 he was awarded the Prize of the Slovak Minister of Culture for Extraordinary Creative Contribution to Slovak Cinema.

== Works ==
=== TV and film ===
- The Devil Never Sleeps (Slovak: Čert nespí) (1956)
- The Man Who Knocks (Slovak: Muž, ktorý klope) (1956)
- The Man Who Never Returned (Slovak: Muž, ktorý sa nevrátil) (1959)
- The Boxer and Death (Slovak: Boxer a smrť) (1962)
- A Face in the Window (Slovak: Tvár v okne) (1963)
- The Case of Barnabáš Kos (Slovak: Prípad Barnabáš Kos) (1964)
- Before This Night Is Over (Slovak: Kým sa skoncí táto noc) (1966)
- Seven Witnesses (Slovak: Sedem svedkov) (1967)
- ...and Be Good (Slovak: ...A sekať dobrotu) (1968)
- Dialogues 20-40-60 (Slovak: Dialóg 20-40-60) (1968)
- Famous Dog (Slovak: Slávny pes) (1971)
- And I'll Run to the Ends of the Earth (Slovak: A pobežím až na kraj sveta) (1979)
- Anticipation (Slovak: Tušenie) (1982)
- About Fame and Grass (Slovak: O sláve a tráve) (1984)

=== Documentaries ===
- Negative Development Process (Slovak: Negativní vyvolávací proces) (1951)
- Thou Shalt Not Steal (Slovak: Nepokradneš) (1973)
- Why They Avoid School (Slovak: Prečo chodia poza školu) (1976)
- Everything Has Its Time (Slovak: Všetko má svoj čas) (1976)
