= Alon Shtruzman =

- אלון שטרוזמן
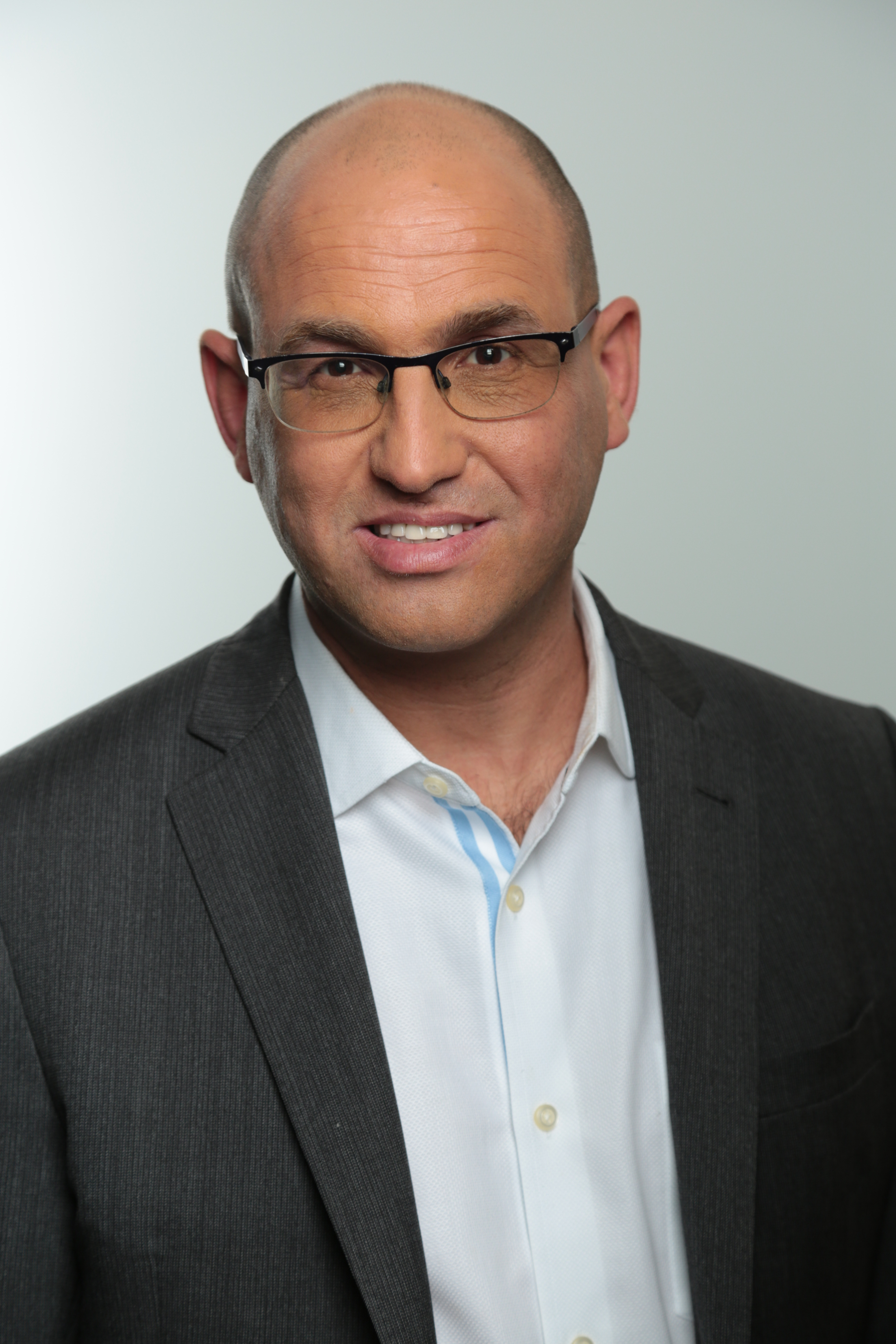
- Occupations: Producer; Entrepreneur; Media Executive
- Years active: 30
- Known for: TV, film and digital content production and distribution

Alon Shtruzman (Hebrew: אלון שטרוזמן) is an Israeli-British, U.S-based media executive, television, and film producer. He is a former executive at Viacom, Fox, and Nat Geo, and the founder and former CEO of Keshet International. Shtruzman is known for movies and TV shows such as In Treatment, La Brea, Echo 3, Our Boys, Tatami, and more. He launched pioneering video-on-demand and game-on-demand services and was featured in Variety's "Dealmakers Impact Report" for rolling out Keshet International and setting production and distribution outposts worldwide.

== Career ==
In 1991, Alon Shtruzman joined ICP (Israel Cable Programming), a company formed by Israeli local cable companies to produce original channels jointly. In 1992, he was appointed to the position of creative director, in charge of original production and on-air promo. Within ICP, he was one of the drivers behind The Children Channel (Arutz HaYeladim), Israel's first kids television network. In 1995 Shtruzman joined the founding team of Israel's first independent channel producer, Noga Communication.

In 2000, Shtruzman founded Zoe Interactive, where he served as the company's first CEO. In 2002, he became VP of Content at Zoe's mother company, Ananey Group, where he launched a bouquet of digital channels, including Nickelodeon Israel.

In 2004, he became managing director of ICP where he introduced Israel's pioneering Video on demand service and was responsible for the commissioning and production of TV shows and films including "Someone to Run With", "The Arbitrator" and "In Treatment". During the merger of the regional cable operators, Shtruzman led the consolidation of ICP into the unified company and became the first vice president of content for Hot (Israel). In 2007, he joined News Corp's Fox International Channels and National Geographic Channels as Vice President of Digital, based in Rome and then London.

In 2009 Shtruzman became COO and president of media for cloud gaming pioneer Playcast Media Systems which was later sold to video-game rental service Gamefly.

In 2012 Shtruzman joined Keshet Media Group and launched Keshet International which produces and distributes shows such as Deal With It, Rising Star, Master Class, Dig, Dear Neighbours, Prisoners of War and Boom. In the U.S. he was executive producer for Dig, Rising Star and Boom. In 2014, Shtruzman moved with his family from London to Los Angeles to launch Keshet Studios as Keshet International's Hollywood production arm.

In 2016, Shtruzman founded Stardom Ventures, a venture capital fund, which raised 65 million USD for investment in tech start-ups in 2021. In 2018, Shtruzman expanded Keshet International's production footprint in the US, Germany, and the UK including the acquisition of production companies Tresor and Greenbird Media Group.

== Film and television ==
Television
Year	Title	Credit	Network
1998	HaBigbagim (TV Series)	supervising producer	Arutz HaYeladim
2005	In-Treatment (Betipul) (TV Series)	executive producer (2 episodes)	Hot Channel 3
2007	The Arbitrator	executive producer (11 episodes)	Hot Channel 3
2006–2008	On Any Saturday	executive producer (24 episodes)	Channel 3
2006–2008	The Champion	executive producer (256 episodes)	
2013	HaKochav HaBa	executive producer (22 episodes)	
2013	Rising Star	executive producer (4 episodes)	Channel 2 (2013–2017) Keshet 12 (2017–)
2015	Dig	executive producer (4 episodes)	USA Network
2015	Boom!	executive producer (10 episodes)	
2017	The Brave	executive producer (2 episodes)	NBC
2017–2018	Wisdom of the Crowd	executive producer (5 episodes)	CBS
2018	Skinny Dip	executive producer (1 episode)	
2019	Our Boys (TV miniseries)		HBO
2020	Lincoln Rhyme: Hunt for the Bone Collector	executive producer (10 episodes)	NBC
2020	The Baker and the Beauty	executive producer (9 episodes)	ABC
2021	La Brea	executive producer (10 episodes)	NBC
2022–2023	Echo 3	executive producer (10 episodes)	Apple TV+
N/A	The Missing	executive producer (1 episode)	Peacock
N/A	Rise and Kill First	executive producer (1 episode)	Keshet International & HBO
N/A	A Small Light (TV Mini-Series)	executive producer	Disney+

Film
Year	Title	Credit
2006	Someone to Run With	executive producer
2017	Salamander (TV Movie)	executive producer
2020	Save Yourselves!	executive producer
2020	Boy*Friends	executive producer
2023	Tatami	executive producer
2025	Bookends	executive producer

== See also ==
- Avi Nir
