= Echo 3 =

American television series

- Promotional poster
- Genre: Action thriller; Drama
- Created by: Mark Boal
- Based on: When Heroes Fly by Omri Givon
- Starring: Jessica Ann Collins; Luke Evans; Michiel Huisman; Temuera Morrison; Elizabeth Anweis
- Composer: Christopher Young
- Country of origin: United States
- Original languages: English; Spanish
- No. of seasons: 1
- No. of episodes: 10

Production
- Executive producers: Mark Boal; Jason Horwitch; Peter Traugott; Mark Sourian; Pablo Trapero; Omri Givon; Eitan Mansuri; Jonathan Doweck; Avi Nir; Alon Shtruzman; Karni Ziv
- Running time: 42–61 minutes
- Production companies: Solid State Pictures; Mark Boal Productions; Keshet Studios

Original release
- Network: Apple TV+
- Release: November 23, 2022 – January 13, 2023

Echo 3 is an American action thriller television series created by Mark Boal. The series, filmed in English and Spanish, stars Michiel Huisman, Luke Evans, and Jessica Ann Collins and is a black ops thriller and tale of international intrigue, set in Colombia, and shot almost entirely on location in 2021. It is based on the Israeli award-winning series When Heroes Fly created by Omri Givon, and inspired by the eponymous novel of Amir Gutfreund. Echo 3 premiered on Apple TV+ on November 23, 2022.

== Synopsis ==
Amber Chesborough is an American scientist in Colombia researching psychedelics to treat addiction. When she is kidnapped by militants, her brother, Bambi, and her husband, Prince, both US Army Delta Force operators, attempt to rescue her. The men have a complicated relationship, after a recent mission left their team leader dead.

== Cast ==
- Michiel Huisman as Sergeant First Class Eric "Prince" Haas, a US Army Delta Force operator, husband of Amber, Bambi's brother-in-law and teammate.
- Luke Evans as Master Sergeant Alex "Bambi" Chesborough, a seasoned US Army Delta Force operator, brother of Amber, Prince's brother-in-law and teammate.
- Jessica Ann Collins as Amber Chesborough, a scientist researching psychedelics
  - Lexi Janicek as young Amber Chesborough
- Elizabeth Anweis as Natalie Foster
- Fahim Fazli as Jabar, an Al Qaeda Commander
- James Udom as Mitch
- Maria Del Rosario as Graciela
- Alejandro Furth as Tomas
- Juan Pablo Raba as Ernesto Matiz
- Sofia Buenaventura as Fami
- Javier Rosado as Julian
- Bradley Whitford as Prince's father
- Martina Gusmán as Violeta Matiz, a prominent political journalist
- Franka Potente as Hildy, a prison camp member of Amber's in Colombia
- Temuera Morrison as Roy Lennon, ex-New Zealand Special Air Service

== Episodes ==
No.	Title	Directed by	Written by	Original release date
1	"Flyaway"	Pablo Trapero	Teleplay by : Mark Boal; Story by : Mark Boal	November 23, 2022
Amber Chesborough, an American scientist researching psychedelic drugs to combat addiction, is captured in Colombia and held hostage for potentially being a spy. Her husband, Prince, and her brother, Bambi, are concerned after not hearing from her for many days. Prince and Bambi, who are both highly trained elite soldiers, decide to go to Colombia to figure out firsthand what has happened, as much as their own friendship is strained from a mishap from a previous Special Operations mission they were both a part of.
2	"Tora Bora in the City"	Pablo Trapero	Jason Horwitch and Mark Boal	November 23, 2022
Prince and Bambi arrive in Colombia, proceeding to the United States Embassy for further details. After patiently waiting for the local authorities to negotiate a release, Amber's situation changes based on new information obtained by her captors. Knowing the implications of Amber's new value to the hostage takers, Prince and Bambi see no choice but to intervene on their own, infiltrating the dangerous neighborhood where Amber is being held.
3	"The Gambler"	Claudia Llosa	Mark Boal & André Jacquemetton & Maria Jacquemetton	November 23, 2022
Prince and Bambi try the diplomatic approach to getting Amber released with Prince appearing on TV and Bambi on the radio with journalist Violeta Matiz describing their plight. Violeta meets with Amber's captors, hopeful of a peaceful resolution, but results in a more dire situation. After learning of Amber and her captors being on the move toward Venezuela, the two men join the Colombian military in a covert operation to reach them right before they cross the Venezuelan border. Prince's personal victory is short-lived.
4	"Upriver"	Claudia Llosa	André Jacquemetton & Maria Jacquemetton	December 2, 2022
Prince awakens in an Atlanta hospital while Bambi decides to play the long game of rescuing Amber by choosing to live in Venezuela, fending on his own. Prince's father explains the harsh reality of Amber's situation, making him contemplate whether to move on in his life alone. A glimmer of hope comes in the form of Mitch having an off-the-books idea that may just be the help that Bambi needs.
5	"We Reject Your Influence"	Mark Boal	Jill Blotevogel and Christopher Stetson Boal & Mark Boal	December 9, 2022
Amber arrives at a massive Venezuelan prison colony composed of women, men, and even children. She meets up with Tomas who serves as a public relations liaison between the prison and his boss, government minister Tariq, who is also behind trafficking drugs. Tomas explains the gravity of the situation to Amber, later trying to exploit her through video. Unabashed by the various torments imposed on her, Amber decides to try the unthinkable.
6	"Habeas Thumpus"	Pablo Trapero	Nikki Broderick & Jason Horwitch	December 16, 2022
54 days after the failed rescue mission to get back Amber, Prince and Mitch arrive in Colombia only to find a down-and-out Bambi. The trio devise a new plan to acquire leverage in the form of capturing Momo, a DJ but connected to Tariq. Mitch confronts Tariq in his office about being serious about getting Amber released.
7	"Red Is Positive, Black Is Negative"	Pablo Trapero	Christopher Stetson Boal	December 23, 2022
Roy arrives in Colombia to join Prince and Bambi with their continued mission. Bambi's mother also arrives out of concern for her children. Violetta meets the Colombian president, inquiring about their response regarding the Momo incident. After receiving Tariq's clear and violent response, Prince and Bambi see no choice but to escalate their tactics involving Momo.
8	"Family Matters"	Mark Boal	Zach Craley and Mark Boal	December 30, 2022
The daily grind of being imprisoned, drugged, and tortured starts to get to Amber. Momo is released, immediately going to Tariq to confront him on his response. Word starts to circulate about the captors' imminent plans for Amber, forcing Prince and Bambi to speed up setting up their upcoming rescue mission. With the help of both Mitch and Prince's father, the mission is kicked off. Prince and Bambi further discuss the details of their previous infamous mission, whose outcome originally led to their estrangement.
9	"Scorched Earth"	Jeffrey Nachmanoff	Mark Boal & Mauricio Leiva-Cook & Zach Craley	January 6, 2023
With only 48 minutes to accomplish their rescue mission, Prince, Bambi, and their army of mercenaries descend on the prison camp where Amber is being held. Violeta is alerted of the fighting and consults a source to find out just who is behind the attack.
10	"Heat"	Mark Boal	Mark Boal	January 13, 2023
While Mitch arranges their evacuation back to the U.S., Prince, Bambi, and a shell-shocked Amber stay in hiding. Violeta continues to prod the President of Colombia for his knowledge of the prison camp attack, guilting him that it has now triggered a war between Colombia and Venezuela. Amber takes a long hard look at who she has become, inadvertently contributing to a tragedy along with her husband and brother. The Colombian army zeroes in on Prince, Bambi, and Amber as they try to get to Mitch.

== Production ==
=== Development ===
In July 2020, Apple announced that it had given a 10-episode straight-to-series order for Echo 3, to be produced by Apple and Keshet Studios, and adapted by Mark Boal, with Boal and Jason Horwitch executive producing and co-showrunning the series.

=== Casting ===
In May 2021, Luke Evans and Michiel Huisman were cast in the series, with Elizabeth Anweis and Jessica Ann Collins joining in June 2021.

=== Filming ===
Production for Echo 3 began on June 9, 2021 and concluded on February 1, 2022. Filming, which lasted over 200 days, occurred in Atlanta, Georgia and on location in Colombia. The Afghanistan sequence was shot on a mountaintop at Angel Fire, New Mexico.

=== Marketing ===
The trailer debuted on October 18, 2022. Reviews of the trailer have Echo 3 looking tensely realistic and politically relevant. Several reviews of the trailer mention a line from Amber (Collins) who tells a journalist, "You don’t know my family". One review of the trailer said, "The series is created by two-time Academy Award winner Mark Boal, who’s had plenty of experience in penning thriller stories about foreign policy and with complex political implications."

== Reception ==
=== Critical response ===
The review aggregator website Rotten Tomatoes reported a 68% approval rating with an average rating of 6.2/10, based on 25 critic reviews. The website's critics consensus reads, "If Echo 3 doesn't meet creator Mark Boal's evident ambitions for multilayered drama, it succeeds as a lean, mean action adventure". On Metacritic, the show has a weighted average score of 67 out of 100 based on 11 critic reviews, indicating "generally favorable reviews".
