= Mandana Dayani =

Iranian-American businesswoman (born 1982)

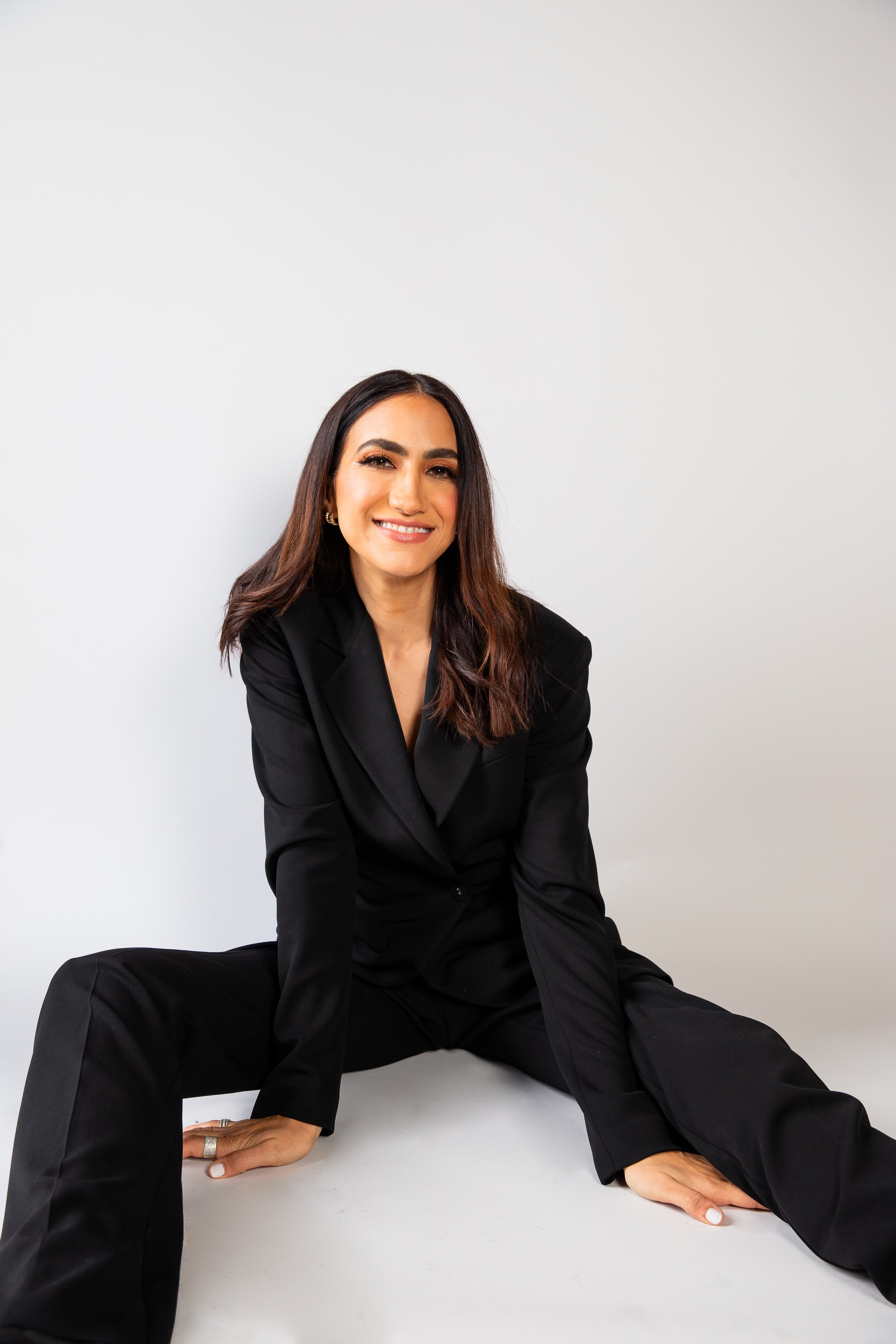
- Born: Mandana Rivka Dayani; 1982 (age 43–44); Iran
- Education: University of Southern California (BA, JD)
- Occupations: Businesswoman, media executive, and attorney
- Spouse: Peter Traugott

Mandana Rivka Dayani (born 1982) is an Iranian-American businesswoman, media executive, and attorney. In 2018, she co-founded "I Am a Voter," a nonpartisan organization aimed at educating and mobilizing voters, in partnership with Creative Artists Agency. From 2021 to 2022, she served as the president of Archewell, the media and philanthropic company founded by Prince Harry, Duke of Sussex, and Meghan, Duchess of Sussex. Since the Gaza war started in October 2023, Dayani has made frequent media appearances to speak on antisemitism.

== Early life and education ==
Dayani was born in Iran during the Iraq-Iran war into a Persian Jewish family who had attempted to leave Iran since the 1979 Iranian revolution. They obtained a travel visa to go to Italy in 1987. They were granted asylum as religious refugees in the United States with the help of Jewish American nonprofit HIAS, and when she was five years old she and her family moved to Queens, New York, where her father worked as a shoe salesman; they eventually moved to Los Angeles. Her father owned a wholesale distributor of children's clothing in Los Angeles.

Dayani attended the University of Southern California, where she received her bachelor's degree and went on to earn her Juris Doctor from the USC Gould School of Law.

== Career ==
=== Early career ===
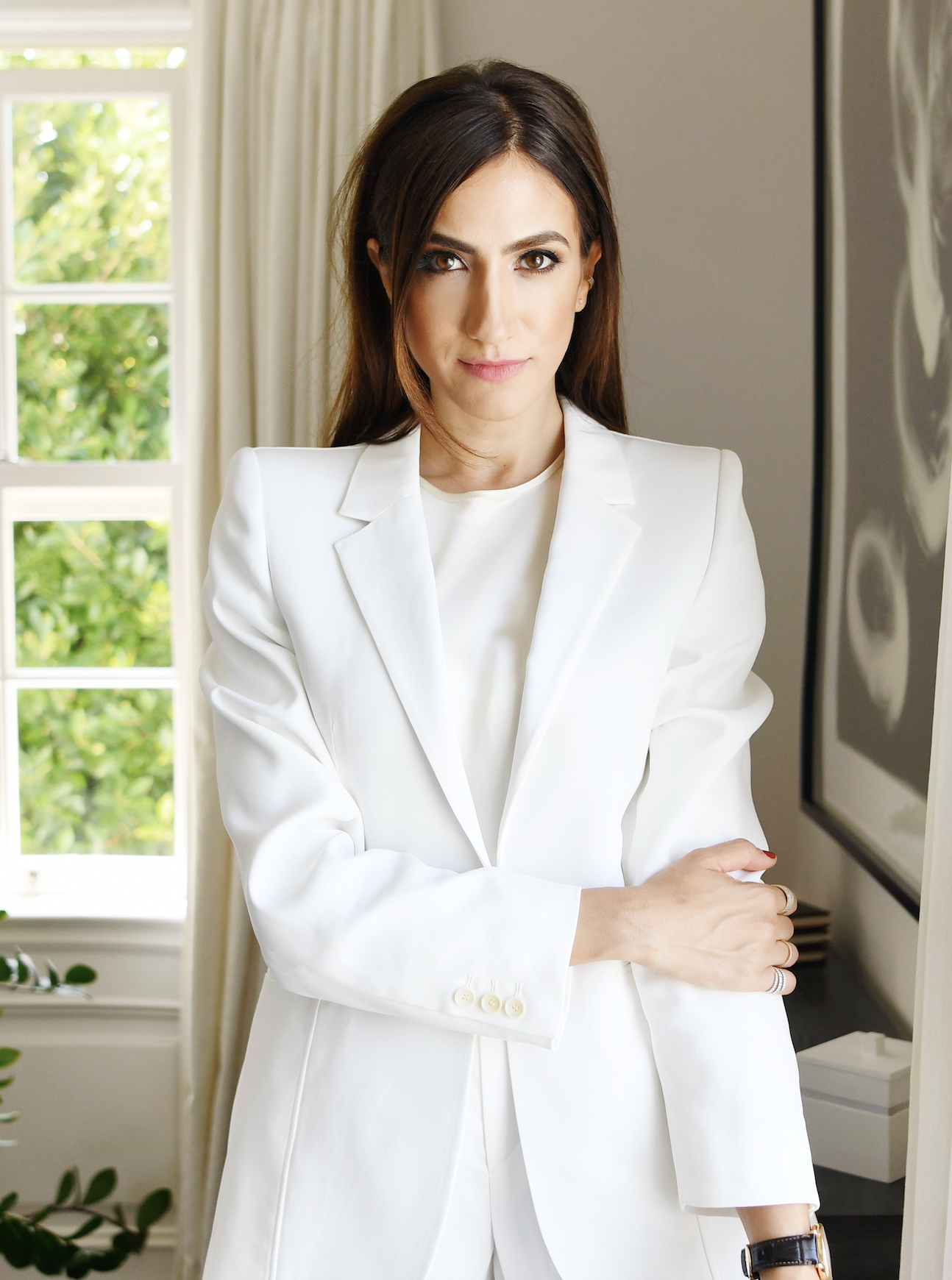
Dayani in 2020

Dayani began her career as a corporate attorney at Paul Hastings. She then became a talent agent representing celebrities and fashion designers, including fashion stylist Rachel Zoe. This led her to later become head of the company Rachel Zoe, Inc., which included The Rachel Zoe Collection, The Zoe Report, Rachel Zoe Ventures, The Curateur, and a producer and regular on her reality television series, The Rachel Zoe Project (2008–2013).

Dayani was chief brand officer of an online marketplace for estate sales named Everything But The House, and the executive producer of its show on HGTV.

=== Business ventures ===
Dayani was chief brand officer of an online marketplace for estate sales named Everything But The House. From May 2021 to December 2022, she was the president of Archewell, the media and philanthropic company founded by Prince Harry, Duke of Sussex, and Meghan, Duchess of Sussex. During this time, she played a significant role in the couple's business dealings with Spotify and Netflix.

==== I Am a Voter ====
During New York Fashion Week in late 2018, Dayani co-founded "I Am a Voter," a nonpartisan organization aimed at educating and mobilizing voters, which has been promoted by celebrities and athletes. The organization was co-founded by more than 30 women and the Creative Artists Agency. A social media campaign headed by the organization involved having actors meet with their former costars, including actors from Will & Grace, Friends, Iron Man, and The Avengers.

Ahead of the 2024 US presidential election, the organization announced a merger with the nonpartisan voter registration organization HeadCount to consolidate resources.

==== Archewell ====
From May 2021 to December 2022, she was the president of Archewell, the media and philanthropic company founded by Prince Harry, Duke of Sussex, and Meghan, Duchess of Sussex. She stepped down from the position in December 2022, shortly before the release of Archewell's Netflix documentary.

== Activism ==
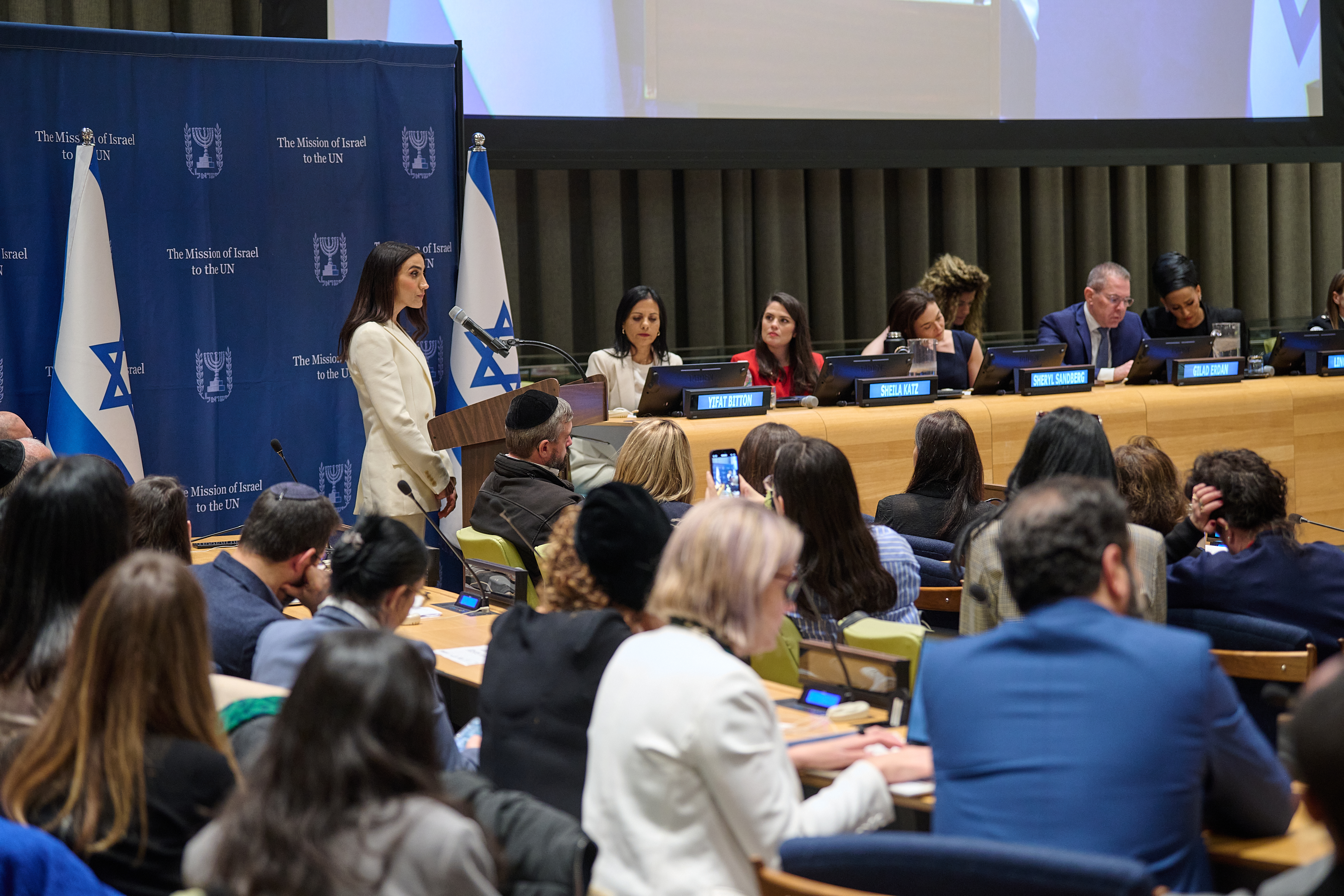
Dayani speaking at a 2023 event presented by the Permanent Mission of Israel to the United Nations

Dayani's experience as a religious refugee from Iran is one of her stated inspirations behind her activism.

In 2020, Dayani, together with her friend actress Debra Messing, launched The Dissenters podcast with Dear Media. The podcast features interviews with advocates for social issues, including Glennon Doyle, Adam Schiff, Jane Fonda, Hillary Clinton, Eva Longoria, and Sophia Bush. Dayani and Messing were dubbed "Jewish Champions" on the cover of The Jewish Journal in June 2023; the publication praised them for their "Unabashed Jewish Pride and Fearless Activism".

Since the beginning of the Gaza war in October 2023, Dayani has made media appearances to speak on antisemitism. She has regularly appeared on MSNBC to comment on the impact of antisemitism on Jews in the Jewish diaspora. Dayani's video about the October 7 Hamas-led attack on Israel was viewed approximately 50 million times. She was also named one of the "Top 100 Influential Jews" for the Hebrew year of 5782 (from 2021 to 2022) by the Tel Aviv Institute. She spoke on the attack as part of an event at the Permanent Mission of Israel to the United Nations, later that year. Amidst nationwide pro-Palestinian protests on university campuses in 2024, she spoke at a rally in Cornell University that was organized to combat antisemitism on campus and throughout the U.S.

In March 2024, she appeared on Morning Joe to discuss global responses to sexual violence by Hamas, criticizing the lack of public support for victims. In April 2024, Dayani spoke at a "Jewish Unity Rally" at Cornell University, an event organized to address antisemitism and support Israel amid calls for divestment from pro-Palestine activists. Dayani interviewed hostages, including Moran Stella Yanai.

In 2025, Dayani was appointed by President Biden to serve on the United States Holocaust Memorial Council Board of Trustees.

== Personal life ==
Dayani married Peter Traugott, a media executive and producer, in 2010. The couple sold their home in the Sunset Strip of West Hollywood, California, for $1.5 million in 2012. She signed to the Creative Artists Agency in 2023.

== See also ==
- List of Iranian businesswomen
