= Wisdom of the Crowd =

American drama television series

- Genre: Crime drama Science fiction
- Based on: Wisdom of the Crowd by Shira Hadad & Dror Mishani
- Developed by: Ted Humphrey
- Starring: Jeremy Piven; Monica Potter; Richard T. Jones; Natalia Tena; Blake Lee
- Composer: Paul Haslinger
- Country of origin: United States
- Original language: English
- No. of seasons: 1
- No. of episodes: 13

Production
- Executive producers: Ted Humphrey; Avi Nir; Alon Shtruzman; Peter Traugott; Rachel Kaplan; Dror Mishani; Shira Hadad; Adam Davidson
- Camera setup: Single-camera
- Running time: 44 minutes
- Production companies: Algorithm Entertainment; Keshet International; Universal Television; CBS Television Studios

Original release
- Network: CBS
- Release: October 1, 2017 – January 14, 2018

Wisdom of the Crowd is an American science fiction crime drama television series based on the Israeli series of the same name by Shira Hadad and Dror Mishani. The series premiered on CBS October 1, 2017, and ended on January 14, 2018. The series was produced by CBS Television Studios and Universal Television.

== Premise ==
A tech innovator creates a new age crowd-sourcing hub to solve his daughter's murder, as well as changing crime solving in San Francisco.

== Cast and characters ==
=== Main ===
- Jeremy Piven as Jeffrey Tanner
- Richard T. Jones as Detective Tommy Cavanaugh
- Natalia Tena as Sara Morton
- Blake Lee as Josh Novak
- Monica Potter as Alex Hale
- Jake Matthews as Tariq Bakari

=== Recurring ===
- Ramses Jimenez as Carlos Ochoa
- Malachi Weir as Mike Leigh
- Ion Overman as Elena Ruiz
- Abigail Cowen as Mia Tanner
- Noel Gugliemi as Flaco Guerrero

== Production ==
On February 9, 2017, it was announced that CBS had given the receive-a-pilot order for Wisdom of the Crowd based on the Israeli format. The episode was written and authored by Ted Humphrey, who was expected to be an executive producer, alongside Avi Nir, Alon Shtruzman, Peter Traugott, Rachel Kaplan, Dror Mishani, Shira Hadad, and Adam Davidson. Production companies involved with the pilot include Algorithm Entertainment, Keshet International, Universal Television, and CBS Television Studios. On May 12, 2017, CBS officially ordered the pilot to series. A few days later, it was announced that the series would premiere by October 1, 2017, and air on Sundays at 8:00 p.m.

On November 27, 2017, CBS opted not to order more than 13 episodes of the series and cancelled the show following the weak ratings.

=== Casting ===
On February 27, 2017, it was reported that Jeremy Piven would play the lead role of Jeffrey Tanner. In March 2017, they have been cast were reported to be: Richard T. Jones, Blake Lee, Natalia Tena and Jake Matthews as well as Monica Potter.

On November 23, 2017, lead actor Piven was involved in allegations of sexual harassment. A day later, CBS stated that all 13 commissioned episodes had already been filmed, as shooting had wrapped up in December 2017.

== Episodes ==
No.	Title	Directed by	Written by	Original release date	U.S. viewers (millions)
1	"Pilot"	Adam Davidson	Ted Humphrey	October 1, 2017	8.83
Jeffrey Tanner (Jeremy Piven) is obsessed with finding who murdered his daughter and has developed an online, crowd sourcing app called Sophe to help him. His team is a unique collection of talented individuals with many different skills.
2	"In The Wild"	Adam Davidson	Ted Humphrey	October 8, 2017	7.84
A 13-year-old boy goes missing, so Tanner uses Sophe to help find him.
3	"Machine Learning"	Jon Amiel	Matthew Lau & Aiyana White	October 15, 2017	8.04
Crime data is entered into Sophe looking for links to Mia. Instead it links 3 previously unrelated cases. When Cavanagh adds a clue it jumps to 14 and keeps climbing with crowd help. Meanwhile Carlos Ochoa is threatened in prison.
4	"User Bias"	Charles Beeson	Kim Shumway & Patrick Moss	October 22, 2017	7.70
Tanner has to deal with cyber attacks when they are asked to help solve the murder of a white supremacist. Tanner and his wife are at odds when private information is leaked to Sophie regarding their deceased daughter.
5	"Clear History"	Deran Sarafian	David Appelbaum & Erica Saleh	October 29, 2017	6.76
A medically retired Inspector is murdered. Cavanaugh is not allowed on the case due to his prior involvement with the widow, so he seeks Tanner's help. Meanwhile, Tanner's prior company alleges he stole their code to create Sophe.
6	"Trojan Horse"	Stephen Kay	Andrew Dettmann & Joshua Hale Fialkov	November 5, 2017	7.87
A computer expert creates a game that targets lonely teenagers and compels them to commit suicide. Meanwhile, a clue emerges in a photo of Tanner's daughter.
7	"Trade Secrets"	Adam Davidson	Matthew Lau	November 12, 2017	6.56
Cavanaugh's plans to reconnect with his 14-year-old son are interrupted when the team and the crowd identify a fugitive domestic terrorist on the loose; Tanner and Sara's ongoing legal troubles drive a wedge between them, with Mike trapped in the middle; Alex confronts Tanner about the Congressional investigation; the team loses control of the crowd, with potentially deadly consequences.
8	"Denial of Service"	Eagle Egilsson	Kim Shumway	November 19, 2017	6.03
Tanner and the team race to halt a digital attack that has silenced the crowd and knocked the platform offline, forcing Tanner and Alex to make a deal with an untrustworthy rival; Cavanaugh and Sara question three suspects in the suspicious death of a Silicon Valley CEO; the Hive endures unwanted visitors.
9	"Proof of Concept"	Roxann Dawson	Aiyana White	November 26, 2017	6.72
Tanner is offered new evidence in Mia's case if Sophe can prove someone is innocent of murder. Tanner and Sara begin depositions with AllSourcer for the rights to Sara's work and Sophe's code.
10	"Live Stream"	Milan Cheylov	David Appelbaum	December 10, 2017	6.11
The team tracks a killer targeting online celebrities and broadcasting their final moments on a live-streaming platform; Sara worries about being banned from using Sophe.
11	"Alpha Test"	Adam Davidson	Erica Saleh	December 17, 2017	6.65
Tariq and the team use the Crowd to aid a friend and blogger targeted by an internet stalker; Tanner's pursuit of a mysterious series of payments tied to his daughter's murder leads to bruising consequences.
12	"Root Directory"	Liz Friedlander	Joshua Hale Fialkov	January 7, 2018	5.73
Jeffrey and detective Tom speak to Carlos, and he remembers something vaguely about a man taking a selfie with Mia on her phone. But something is wrong.
13	"The Tipping Point"	Eric Laneuville	Teleplay by : Andrew Dettmann & Patrick Moss; Story by : Andrew Dettmann	January 14, 2018	5.80
Tanner and Hale go to court to convince a judge to free Carlos. A man who was obsessed with Sophe, including Mia's case, is found dead. Investigating this man leads Tanner to information revealing a city official's killer.

== Reception ==
The review aggregator website Rotten Tomatoes registered an approval rating of 26% based on 19 reviews, with an average rating of 5.56/10. The site's critical consensus reads, "Wisdom of the Crowd wastes a talented cast on a formulaic procedural crime drama that wavers between modest returns and unintentional laughs." Metacritic, which uses a normalized rating, assigned a weighted average score of 35 out of 100 based on 17 critics, indicating "generally unfavorable reviews".

=== Ratings ===
Viewership and ratings per episode of Wisdom of the Crowd
No.	Title	Air date	Viewers (millions)
1	"Pilot"	October 1, 2017	8.83
2	"In the Wild"	October 8, 2017	7.84
3	"Machine Learning"	October 15, 2017	8.04
4	"User Bias"	October 22, 2017	7.70
5	"Clear History"	October 29, 2017	6.76
6	"Trojan Horse"	November 5, 2017	7.87
7	"Trade Secrets"	November 12, 2017	6.56
8	"Denial of Service"	November 19, 2017	6.03
9	"Proof of Concept"	November 26, 2017	6.72
10	"Live Stream"	December 10, 2017	6.11
11	"Alpha Test"	December 17, 2017	6.65
12	"Root Directory"	January 7, 2018	5.73
13	"The Tipping Point"	January 14, 2018	5.80
