= Our Boys (miniseries) =

American Israeli miniseries

- Genre: Drama; Legal drama
- Created by: Hagai Levi; Joseph Cedar; Tawfik Abu-Wael
- Starring: Shlomi Elkabetz; Michael Aloni; Johnny Arbid; Adam Gabay; Or Ben-Melech; Ruba Blal Asfour; Eyal Shikartzi; Lior Ashkenazi; Jacob Cohen
- Countries of origin: United States; Israel
- Original languages: Hebrew and Arabic
- No. of episodes: 10

Production
- Executive producers: Hagai Levi; Joseph Cedar; Avi Nir; Alon Shtruzman; Karni Ziv; Peter Traugott; Rachel Kaplan; Noah Stollman; Michael Lombardo
- Production companies: MoviePlus Productions; Keshet Media Group

Original release
- Network: HBO
- Release: August 12 – October 7, 2019

Our Boys (Hebrew: הנערים, Arabic: فتیان) is an American-Israeli television miniseries created by Hagai Levi, Joseph Cedar and Tawfik Abu-Wael. It focuses on the kidnapping and murder of Mohammed Abu Khdeir, its investigation and the aftermath.

It stars Shlomi Elkabetz, Johnny Arbid, Adam Gabay, Or Ben-Melech, Ruba Blal Asfour, Eyal Shikartzi, Lior Ashkenazi and Noa Koler.

The ten episodes premiered in the United States on August 12, 2019, on HBO. It is a co-production between HBO and Keshet Studios.

== Premise ==
It follows Simon (Shlomi Elkabetz), an officer of the Shin Bet, assigned to investigate Israeli extremist cells, in the background of the kidnapping and murder of three Israeli teenagers, allegedly committed by militants of the Hamas.

Meanwhile inside the West Bank, Palestinians are being harassed by Israeli settlers seeking retaliation. The Abu Khdeir family lives a somewhat peaceful life in East Jerusalem. One night during Ramadan, while waiting for his morning prayer, Mohammed Abu Khdeir (Ram Masarweh) is kidnapped and murdered by three Israeli extremists.

The crime repercussions affects deeply the never-ending Israeli–Palestinian conflict, resulting in more violent confrontations between Palestinians and the Israeli forces in Jerusalem, and the 2014 Gaza War.

== Cast ==
- Shlomi Elkabetz as Simon
- Johnny Arbid as Hussein Abu Khdeir
- Ruba Blal Asfour as Suha Abu Khdeir
- Adam Gabay as Avishay Elbaz
- Or Ben-Melech as Yosef Haim Ben-David
- Eyal Shikartzi as Yinon Edri
- Lior Ashkenazi as State Attorney deputy Uri Korb
- Noa Koler as Devora
- Michael Aloni as Itzik
- Jacob Cohen as Rabbi Shalom Ben-David
- Ram Masarweh as Mohammed Abu Khdeir
- Shadi Mar'i as Eyad Abu Khdeir
- Yoav Rotman as Yochi Har Zahav

== Episodes ==
No.	Title	Directed by	Written by	Original release date	U.S. viewers (millions)
1	"Chapter 1: Out of the Depth, I Cry to You"	Joseph Cedar & Tawfik Abu-Wael	Joseph Cedar & Tawfik Abu-Wael	August 12, 2019	0.124
2	"Chapter 2: I Love Toto"	Tawfik Abu-Wael & Joseph Cedar	Joseph Cedar & Tawfik Abu-Wael & Noah Stollman	August 12, 2019	0.100
3	"Chapter 3: Two Packs of Red Next"	Joseph Cedar & Tawfik Abu-Wael	Joseph Cedar & Tawfik Abu-Wael & Hagai Levi	August 19, 2019	0.140
4	"Chapter 4: The Dawn Martyr"	Joseph Cedar & Tawfik Abu-Wael & Hagai Levi	Shuki Ben Naim & Hagai Levi & Tawfik Abu-Wael	August 26, 2019	0.204
5	"Chapter 5: Shabbat Shalom"	Joseph Cedar & Tawfik Abu-Wael	Shuki Ben Naim & Joseph Cedar & Hagai Levi & Tawfik Abu-Wael	September 2, 2019	0.198
6	"Chapter 6: Acceptance of Silence"	Joseph Cedar & Hagai Levi & Tawfik Abu-Wael	Hagai Levi & Shuki Ben Naim & Tawfik Abu-Wael	September 9, 2019	0.153
7	"Chapter 7: Judging by its End"	Joseph Cedar	Yair Hizmi & Hagai Levi	September 16, 2019	0.099
8	"Chapter 8: Defendants 2 and 3"	Joseph Cedar & Tawfik Abu-Wael & Hagai Levi	Hagai Levi & Yair Hizmi & Tawfik Abu-Wael	September 23, 2019	0.092
9	"Chapter 9: The Perfumer and the Tanner"	Joseph Cedar & Tawfik Abu-Wael	Hagai Levi & Shuki Ben Naim & Tawfik Abu-Wael	September 30, 2019	0.154
10	"Chapter 10: A Shaft Into a Dark Tunnel"	Joseph Cedar & Tawfik Abu-Wael & Hagai Levi	Hagai Levi & Tawfik Abu-Wael	October 7, 2019	0.111

== Production ==
In October 2016, it was reported that HBO was creating a series on the 2014 kidnapping of 3 Israeli teens with Keshet International. The series was filmed on location in Israel and directed by Israeli filmmaker Joseph Cedar and Palestinian writer and director Tawfik Abu Wael, who also co-created the series alongside showrunner Hagai Levi.

== Reception ==
The review aggregator website Rotten Tomatoes reported a 92% approval rating with an average score of 7/10, based on 12 reviews. The website's critical consensus reads, "Challenging and thoughtful, Our Boys explores a real-world tragedy with grace and compassion." Metacritic, which uses a weighted average, assigned a score of 79 out of 100 based on eight critics, indicating "generally favorable reviews".

120 bereaved Israeli families sent a letter to HBO protesting the series, claiming that the show largely glosses over the murder of the three Israeli teens, and that there is a systemic difference in the societal treatment and acceptance of terrorism between Israelis and Palestinians. They demanded that HBO clarify that Palestinian terrorism is much more prevalent than Jewish terrorism. HBO declined to comply with the request.

== Awards and nominations ==
The series won 14 Israeli Academy Awards including Best Drama Series Award, Best Actor for Johnny Arbid, Best Actress for Ruba Blal Asfour, Best Photography for Yaron Scharf, plus Best Direction and Best Screenplay for Hagai Levi, Joseph Cedar and Tawfik Abu Wael. Our Boys has also received nominations in the Entertainment category of the 2020 Peabody Awards and in the Foreign language category of the 2020 Multi-Ethnicity in Communications (NAMIC) Vision Awards.

== Controversies ==
The critical issue that the series depicts sparked an emotional stir in the Palestinian Territories, and received extensive backlash from Israel. The story of a teenager, Muhammad Abu Khdeir, who was killed in 2014 brought back painful memories of the Palestinians and his family. Abu Khdeir's mother, Suha, said that the series brought her back to the day her son was kidnapped. "I wish I could reach into the screen and grab hold of my son," she said.

Benjamin Netanyahu's son, Yair Netanyahu, argued that the series skewed reality and damaged Israel's image. He wrote on Twitter, "The series tells the whole world how the Israelis and Jews are cruel and bloodthirsty murderers, and how the Palestinians are badly done by and oppressed."

Prime minister Benjamin Netanyahu called the series "antisemitic" and called to boycott its co-producing Israeli channel 12. His criticism of the series was accompanied by other remarks towards the network after Netanyahu tried to stop its news department from airing leaked quotes from a legal investigation of his own suspected corruption, earlier the same day.
