= Alert: Missing Persons Unit =

2023 American crime drama series

- Season 1 promotional poster
- Genre: Police procedural; Crime drama
- Created by: John Eisendrath; Jamie Foxx
- Starring: Scott Caan; Dania Ramirez; Ryan Broussard; Adeola Role; Graham Verchere; Alisha-Marie Ahamed
- Composers: Caleb Chan; Dave Porter
- Country of origin: United States
- Original language: English
- No. of seasons: 3
- No. of episodes: 30

Production
- Executive producers: John Eisendrath; Jamie Foxx; Datari Turner; J. R. Orci; Adam Kane; Michael Offer; Carla Kettner; Brad Turner; Sean Hennen; Brandon Sonnier; Jon Cowan; Brandon Margolis
- Producers: Shawn Williamson; Dania Ramirez; Scott Caan; Arielle Boisvert; Martha Fernandez
- Running time: 44–45 minutes
- Production companies: Whale Productions; Foxxhole Productions; Danger Doll Productions; Fox Entertainment; Sony Pictures Television (Note: Credited as Sony Pictures Television Studios in season 1.)

Original release
- Network: Fox
- Release: January 8, 2023 – May 27, 2025

Alert: Missing Persons Unit is an American police procedural series created by John Eisendrath and Jamie Foxx. It premiered on Fox on January 8, 2023. The second season premiered on March 5, 2024. In May 2024, the series was renewed for a third season, which premiered on March 25, 2025. In June 2025, the series was canceled after three seasons.

== Premise ==
Jason Grant (Caan) and Nikki Batista (Ramirez) investigate cases for the Philadelphia Police Department's Missing Persons Unit (MPU) while also trying to find out the truth about their missing son.

== Cast and characters ==
=== Main ===
- Scott Caan as Detective Jason Grant, Nikki's ex-husband, who works in the Missing Persons Unit (MPU) with her to help people find their missing loved ones. He is a former private security contractor.
- Dania Ramirez as Captain Nicolina "Nikki" Batista (seasons 1–2; guest season 3), the commanding officer of the Missing Persons Unit, and Jason's ex-wife.
- Ryan Broussard as Detective Sergeant Michael "Mike" Sherman, a detective with the MPU and Nikki’s fiancé. He and Jason are partners.
- Adeola Role as Detective Kemi Adebayo, a detective with the MPU. She believes that she is a shaman with multiple past lives who infuses her detective work with her spirituality.
- Graham Verchere as Lucas Hadley/Keith Grant (season 1)
- Alisha-Marie Ahamed as Wayne Pascal (seasons 2−3), an expert computer hacker under house arrest

=== Recurring ===
- Fivel Stewart as Sidney Grant (season 1; guest seasons 2–3), Jason and Nikki's daughter
- Petey Gibson as C Hemingway (season 1; guest seasons 2–3), the supervisor of the Missing Persons Unit's forensic imaging unit. He is a trans man who initially struggles with coming out.
- Elana Dunkelman as Rachel (season 1), a medical examiner
- Gil Bellows as Inspector Hollis Braun (season 2)
- Diana Bang as Helen Gale (seasons 2−3), a forensic scientist
- Reedan Elizabeth as MPU Officer Brooks (seasons 2−3)
- Megalyn Echikunwoke as Lieutenant Gabrielle Bennett (season 3), the new leader of the Missing Persons Unit

=== Guest ===
- Bre Blair as June Butler (season 1), Jason's girlfriend and business partner
- Conni Miu as Quinn Walker (season 1), Sidney's best friend
- Kendall Gender as Canary (season 2), a drag queen
- Malcolm-Jamal Warner as Chief Inspector Bill Houston (season 3), the interim leader of the Missing Persons Unit
- Kurt Yaeger as SGT. Adam Kirby (season 3)

== Episodes ==
=== Series overview ===
Season	Episodes	Originally released	
Season	Episodes	First released	Last released
1	10	January 8, 2023	February 27, 2023
2	10	March 5, 2024	May 14, 2024
3	10	March 25, 2025	May 27, 2025

=== Season 1 (2023) ===
No. overall	No. in season	Title	Directed by	Written by	Original release date	U.S. viewers (millions)
1	1	"Chloe"	Michael Offer	Teleplay by : John Eisendrath; Story by : John Eisendrath & Jamie Foxx	January 8, 2023	4.03
2	2	"Hugo"	Michael Offer	John Eisendrath & J.R. Orci	January 9, 2023	1.54
3	3	"Zoey"	Diana Valentine	John Eisendrath	January 16, 2023	1.52
4	4	"Andy"	Diana Valentine	Justin Peacock	January 23, 2023	2.00
5	5	"Miguel"	Hernán Otaño	John Eisendrath	January 30, 2023	2.29
6	6	"Tim and Amy"	Camila Cabello	Katie Varney	February 6, 2023	1.77
7	7	"Shannon"	Christine Moore	Kseniya Melnik	February 13, 2023	1.90
8	8	"Craig"	Christine Moore	Alexander Vesha	February 20, 2023	2.01
9	9	"Briana"	Adam Kane	Kseniya Melnik	February 27, 2023	2.35
10	10	"Max"	Adam Kane	Katie Varney	February 27, 2023	2.35

=== Season 2 (2024) ===
No. overall	No. in season	Title	Directed by	Written by	Original release date	U.S. viewers (millions)
11	1	"Bus 447"	Brad Turner	Carla Kettner	March 5, 2024	1.54
12	2	"Benjamin Franklin"	David Solomon	Brandon Margolis & Brandon Sonnier	March 12, 2024	1.22
13	3	"Gemma & Isabel"	Robert Duncan McNeill	Jon Cowan	March 19, 2024	1.17
14	4	"Maya"	Sarah Pia Anderson	Sean Hennen	March 26, 2024	1.04
15	5	"Ms. Patty"	Oz Scott	Danielle Iman	April 2, 2024	1.08
16	6	"Jedidiah & Lucy"	Marisol Adler	C. Quintana	April 9, 2024	1.00
17	7	"@Kyra"	Erin Feeley	Estevan	April 16, 2024	1.19
18	8	"Alexi"	Sudz Sutherland	Brandon Margolis	April 30, 2024	1.20
19	9	"Paul Miller"	Stephanie Marquadt	Brandon Sonnier	May 7, 2024	1.00
20	10	"Federal Prisoner #07198F-068P"	David Grossman	Jon Cowan	May 14, 2024	1.00

=== Season 3 (2025) ===
No. overall	No. in season	Title	Directed by	Written by	Original release date	U.S. viewers (millions)
21	1	"Bella, Genevieve, Amelia, Tally & Kate"	Randy Zisk	Remy Solomon & Carla Kettner	March 25, 2025	1.35
22	2	"Badge #41870"	David Grossman	Sean Hennen	April 1, 2025	1.04
23	3	"Lay"	Antonio Negret	Carol Bass & Brandon Margolis	April 8, 2025	1.04
24	4	"Sophie"	David Solomon	Dania Bennett & Brandon Sonnier	April 15, 2025	1.07
25	5	"Violet"	Shannon Kohli	Danielle Iman	April 22, 2025	0.97
26	6	"Lillian"	Brad Turner	C. Quintana & Sean Hennen	April 29, 2025	1.05
27	7	"April"	Marisol Adler	Jon Cowan	May 6, 2025	0.89
28	8	"Carmen"	Sudz Sutherland	Brandon Margolis	May 13, 2025	0.90
29	9	"Burt"	Brandon Sonnier	Brandon Sonnier & Estevan	May 20, 2025	1.01
30	10	"Chase"	Brad Turner	Remy Solomon & Carla Kettner	May 27, 2025	1.18

== Production ==
=== Development ===
In March 2022, it was announced John Eisendrath and Sony Pictures Television had Alert in development at Fox with a script, format and back-up script commitment plus penalty. In May of that year, it was announced Fox had given a straight-to-series order to Alert with Eisendrath to serve as showrunner and executive producer alongside Jamie Foxx and Datari Turner.

In March 2023, Fox renewed the series for a second season, which premiered on March 5, 2024. In May 2024, Fox renewed the series for a third season. Production took place in Vancouver. On June 6, 2025, the series was canceled after three seasons.

=== Casting ===
In August 2022, it was announced Dania Ramirez had been cast as one of the leads with Scott Caan cast as the second lead shortly thereafter. In October 2022, Adeola Role, Ryan Broussard, and Graham Verchere were announced as series regulars. In November 2022, Petey Gibson, Fivel Stewart, and Bre Blair joined the cast in recurring roles. In January 2024, Alisha-Marie Ahamed was cast as new series regular while Gil Bellows was cast in a recurring capacity for the second season.

== Reception ==
=== Critical response ===
The review aggregator website Rotten Tomatoes reported a 29% approval rating based on 7 critic reviews, and a 32% audience rating. Metacritic, which uses a weighted average, assigned a score of 48 out of 100 based on 6 critics, indicating "mixed or average reviews".

=== Ratings ===
==== Overall ====
Viewership and ratings per season of Alert: Missing Persons Unit
Season	Timeslot (ET)	Episodes	First aired		Last aired		TV season
Season	Timeslot (ET)	Episodes	Date	Viewers (millions)	Date	Viewers (millions)	TV season
1	Sunday 8:00 p.m. (1); Monday 9:00 p.m. (2–8, 10); Monday 8:00 p.m. (9)	10	January 8, 2023	4.03	February 27, 2023	2.35	2022–23
2	Tuesday 9:00 p.m.	10	March 5, 2024	1.54	May 14, 2024	1.00	2023–24
3	Tuesday 9:00 p.m.	10	March 25, 2025	1.35	May 27, 2025	1.18	2024–25

==== Season 1 ====
Viewership and ratings per episode of Alert: Missing Persons Unit
No.	Title	Air date	Rating (18–49)	Viewers (millions)	DVR (18–49)	DVR viewers (millions)	Total (18–49)	Total viewers (millions)
1	"Chloe"	January 8, 2023	0.9	4.03	0.2	1.43	1.1	5.46
2	"Hugo"	January 9, 2023	0.2	1.54	0.2	1.59	0.4	3.13
3	"Zoey"	January 16, 2023	0.2	1.52	0.2	1.54	0.4	3.05
4	"Andy"	January 23, 2023	0.3	2.00	—N/a	—N/a	—N/a	—N/a
5	"Miguel"	January 30, 2023	0.3	2.29	—N/a	—N/a	—N/a	—N/a
6	"Tim and Amy"	February 6, 2023	0.3	1.77	—N/a	—N/a	—N/a	—N/a
7	"Shannon"	February 13, 2023	0.3	1.90	—N/a	—N/a	—N/a	—N/a
8	"Craig"	February 20, 2023	0.3	2.01	—N/a	—N/a	—N/a	—N/a
9	"Briana"	February 27, 2023	0.2	2.35	—N/a	—N/a	—N/a	—N/a
10	"Max"	February 27, 2023	0.2	2.35	—N/a	—N/a	—N/a	—N/a

==== Season 2 ====
Viewership and ratings per episode of Alert: Missing Persons Unit
No.	Title	Air date	Rating (18–49)	Viewers (millions)
1	"Bus 447"	March 5, 2024	0.2	1.54
2	"Benjamin Franklin"	March 12, 2024	0.2	1.22
3	"Gemma & Isabel"	March 19, 2024	0.1	1.17
4	"Maya"	March 26, 2024	0.2	1.04
5	"Ms. Patty"	April 2, 2024	0.2	1.08
6	"Jedidiah & Lucy"	April 9, 2024	0.1	1.00
7	"@Kyra"	April 16, 2024	0.2	1.19
8	"Alexi"	April 30, 2024	0.1	1.20
9	"Paul Miller"	May 7, 2024	0.1	1.00
10	"Federal Prisoner #07198F-068P"	May 14, 2024	0.1	1.00

==== Season 3 ====
Viewership and ratings per episode of Alert: Missing Persons Unit
No.	Title	Air date	Rating (18–49)	Viewers (millions)
1	"Bella, Genevieve, Amelia, Tally & Kate"	March 25, 2025	0.2	1.35
2	"Badge #41870"	April 1, 2025	0.1	1.04
3	"Lay"	April 8, 2025	0.2	1.04
4	"Sophie"	April 15, 2025	0.1	1.07
5	"Violet"	April 22, 2025	0.1	0.97
6	"Lillian"	April 29, 2025	0.1	1.05
7	"April"	May 6, 2025	0.1	0.89
8	"Carmen"	May 13, 2025	0.1	0.90
9	"Burt"	May 20, 2025	0.1	1.01
10	"Chase"	May 27, 2025	0.2	1.18
