= Lincoln Rhyme: Hunt for the Bone Collector =

2020 American crime drama television series

- Official title-card
- Genre: Crime drama; Thriller
- Based on: The Bone Collector by Jeffery Deaver
- Developed by: VJ Boyd; Mark Bianculli
- Starring: Russell Hornsby; Arielle Kebbel
- Composer: Richard Marvin
- Country of origin: United States
- Original language: English
- No. of seasons: 1
- No. of episodes: 10

Production
- Executive producers: VJ Boyd; Mark Bianculli; Avi Nir; Alon Shtruzman; Peter Traugott; Rachel Kaplan
- Production locations: Meadowlands Arena, East Rutherford, New Jersey
- Camera setup: Single-camera
- Running time: 43 minutes
- Production companies: Signal Hill Productions (pilot); Sin Video (pilot); Keshet Studios; Sony Pictures Television Studios; Universal Television

Original release
- Network: NBC
- Release: January 10 – March 13, 2020

Lincoln Rhyme: Hunt for the Bone Collector is an American crime drama television series that premiered on NBC as part of the 2019–20 television season, on January 10, 2020 and ran until March 13, 2020. The series is based on the 1997 novel The Bone Collector by Jeffery Deaver. While popular as a mid-season replacement show, NBC made the decision in June 2020 to cancel after one season.

== Synopsis ==
The series follows NYPD officer Amelia Sachs, who partners up with disabled forensic expert Lincoln Rhyme and his team to solve cases in pursuit of the legendary serial killer, the Bone Collector.

== Cast ==
=== Main ===
- Russell Hornsby as Lincoln Rhyme, a brilliant but hardheaded forensic criminologist who suffers near-fatal injuries while on the job, leaving him a tetraplegic. He nevertheless continues his work remotely, working with others to solve cases.
- Arielle Kebbel as Amelia Sachs, an intuitive rookie NYPD officer who becomes Lincoln's most trusted ally in the hunt for the Bone Collector.
- Roslyn Ruff as Claire, Lincoln's caregiver and assistant
- Ramses Jimenez as Eric Castillo, an NYPD detective and Sellitto's new partner
- Brooke Lyons as Kate, a forensic scientist who worked with Lincoln during his time on the force
- Tate Ellington as Felix, a computer expert working with the team who is quick to speak his mind
- Courtney Grosbeck as Rachel Sachs, Amelia's teenage sister
- Brían F. O'Byrne as Peter Taylor / The Bone Collector, a serial killer Lincoln has chased for his entire career who reemerges to complete what he considers unfinished business between the two.
- Michael Imperioli as Rick Sellitto, a veteran NYPD detective and Lincoln's former partner

=== Recurring ===
- Claire Coffee as Danielle Taylor, the wife of the Bone Collector
- Tawny Cypress as Naia, Lincoln's ex-fiancée
- Jaidon Walls as Camden Rhyme, Lincoln's son

=== Guest ===
- Rosa Evangelina Arrendondo as Chief Olsen, the chief of police
- Tracie Thoms as FBI Agent Cutter, an FBI Agent who was Lincoln's former supervisor in the NYPD

== Episodes ==
No.	Title	Directed by	Teleplay by	Original release date	U.S viewers (millions)
1	"Pilot"	Seth Gordon	VJ Boyd & Mark Bianculli	January 10, 2020 (Note: The episode was first released online on nbc.com, the NBC app, and Hulu on January 1, 2020.)	4.37
While on patrol, NYPD officer Amelia Sachs stumbles across a victim left by the infamous Bone Collector, which brings her to the attention of Lincoln Rhyme, a retired detective left paralyzed from the neck down while trying to catch him three years ago. Lincoln's ex-partner Sellitto brings him in to consult on the case, and Lincoln insists that Amelia wear a special rig that will allow him to communicate with and see everything she sees as he trusts her to listen to him. A second victim is rescued only seconds before death, and Amelia's intuition gives the team a lead that reveals the killer is not the real Bone Collector--merely a copycat who wants the same glory as the original. The fake Collector kidnaps Amelia's sister Rachel and puts her in a trap to drown before committing suicide by cop. Lincoln uses his insights to determine the location of the trap, and Rachel is saved. Afterwards, Lincoln makes a deal to return to the NYPD as a civilian consultant, with Amelia as his liaison. The real Bone Collector, aware of the copycat's existence, prepares a "gift" to send to Lincoln.
2	"God Complex"	Melanie Mayron	Jon Cowan & Barry O'Brien	January 17, 2020	3.79
A serial killer, The Wrath of the Gods, commits a murder in New York; Lincoln explains that the killer is obsessed with Greek mythology and targets victims based on their resemblance to mythological figures such as Icarus and Orpheus. The team finds a potential lead in David Fleming, a musician whose mother was the Wrath's first victim a decade earlier. However, David tells Amelia that due to the trauma of seeing his mother killed, he remembers nothing. Another victim dies, and Amelia begins to clash with Lincoln over his aggressive and arrogant style of leadership. In response, Sellitto advises her not to get so easily irritated with him. The team identifies two potential suspects: a painter named Calder and his old instructor, Prof. Irene Antoni. Lincoln suggests that Calder, infatuated with Antoni's teachings against the corruption of society, became the Wrath. Amelia stops him from killing David's girlfriend Ally, and Antoni is arrested while Calder is killed in the struggle. Amelia and Lincoln both receive human bones in the mail, and realize that the Bone Collector has returned.
3	"Russian Roulette"	Jono Oliver	Moira Kirland	January 31, 2020	3.36
The team investigates a murder for which there's no body, only a small pendant in the shape of an "L". Sellitto recognizes it as belonging to Lucy Arthur, a girl kidnapped five years earlier who was presumed dead after he failed to find her. When the police look for clues in the small Russian neighborhood bordering the crime scene, however, they encounter hostility, uncooperative witnesses, and the physical destruction of evidence. Suspecting a cover-up, Lincoln uses a small bit of evidence to lead them to a makeshift grave occupied by Max Sobirov, a local stonemason. Searching his apartment, Amelia finds proof that Sobirov kidnapped several teenage girls, including Lucy. The truth emerges: the local residents uncovered Sobirov's crimes and killed him themselves, but were unaware of Lucy's existence. With time running out, Lincoln puts together a list of cemeteries where Sobirov worked and has them all searched. Lucy is found locked in a hidden crypt and Sellitto reunites her with her parents. Ignoring Lincoln's advice, Amelia chooses not to tell Rachel about the Bone Collector.
4	"What Lies Beneath"	Ruba Nadda	Jeff Richard	February 7, 2020	3.64
A teenager is killed near a college forensic testing field. The victim's brother, Ben, blames his stepfather, but nothing is found that directly ties him to the murder. When Sellito and Amelia investigate further, however, they find a potential new lead: the medical examiner who handled the teenager's body, Dr. Arthur Wasden, also performed an autopsy on his late mother, who supposedly died of a heart defect. Lincoln proves otherwise by determining that she was poisoned with arsenic. Amelia visits the victim's home, where she meets a family friend, Melissa, and provokes her into committing assault after correctly deducing that she was the poisoner. Ben goes to kill Dr. Wasden with a stolen gun; Amelia talks him down and Wasden and Melissa are arrested and confess to killing both victims to hide evidence of embezzlement from the school. Lincoln takes a major step in his rehabilitation when he accepts an offer to play a friendly game of chess, leaving his apartment for the first time since he was injured. Felix informs him that, based on cell phone data, he has proof the Bone Collector has returned to New York.
5	"Game On"	Gary Fleder	Lauren Greer	February 14, 2020	3.45
The Bone Collector commits the first of three murders by killing Lincoln's former college professor. Lincoln declares the game has begun, and instructs Amelia how to recognize the three distinct clues the Collector always leaves. This takes them to the scene of the second murder; furious that he's failed to save two victims, Lincoln launches into a heated argument with Amelia on how to proceed, the stress of which triggers a seizure-like event that temporarily incapacitates him. Claire explains that because of his severe paralysis, even minor injuries could potentially kill Lincoln. While working on how to find the third victim, Amelia suggests that the Bone Collector may have altered his MO, to which Lincoln deduces that his clues point to two separate locations. Sellito takes one while Amelia goes to the other. She finds and saves the victim, but the team is nevertheless aware that the Bone Collector will soon strike again now that he's "lost" the game. Lincoln decides to go on offense by publicly declaring his intention to bring the Collector to justice. He and the team agree that they must dig into his past in order to learn who he really is.
6	"'Til Death Do Us Part"	Lisa Demaine	Amy Lambert	February 21, 2020	3.57
Lincoln surprises the team by asking them to investigate a murder where the suspect is a friend of his ex-wife, Naia. Even though all the evidence points to the husband being responsible, Amelia questions him and admits that she also believes he could be innocent. Through extensive research and analysis, the team comes to two conclusions: the murder victim matches several others, indicating the work of a serial killer, and all the victims used the same brand of home server, allowing the killer to track their movements through hacking. Kate and Eric run down the name of the killer, Garrett Harrison, a man who is haunted by the murder of his own mother by his father and feels compelled to recreate it on arguing couples. Harrison goes after his next target, and Lincoln determines the address. While Sellitto is able to find and save the victim, Amelia hunts down Harrison, who tries to stab her rather than flee. She manages a blind shot, which hits and disables him. Afterwards, she visits Lincoln to resume their investigation into the Bone Collector; meanwhile, the Collector realizes his wife is growing wise to his crimes and decides to give her the truth.
7	"Requiem"	Brad Anderson	VJ Boyd	February 28, 2020	3.45
The search for the Bone Collector is interrupted when a bomber threatens the city, demanding a wealthy couple, the Vaughns, publicly admit their responsibility for a fire in one of their buildings that killed forty people. The team shifts gears and investigates the bombing, which seems unsolvable due to the crime scene being a "locked room", inaccessible to any possible suspect. Lincoln determines the bomb was moved through the sewers, which leads Amelia into a trap; with Lincoln's guidance, she escapes with a homemade thermite charge. Sellitto challenges her risking her life as he fears losing another partner. The Vaughns make their confession as Lincoln sends the police to the bomber's home. He refuses to talk, but Amelia guesses where the last bomb is: planted to kill the Vaughns' young son Simon. Sellitto lets her talk down the triggerwoman and save Simon's life, earning her the right to join him and Lincoln for their traditional celebratory drink. The Bone Collector ties up his wife, but finds he can neither kill her nor set her free. Concluding that there is no other option, he releases her and then snaps her neck.
8	"Original Sin"	Jon Amiel	John-Paul Nickel	March 6, 2020	3.71
Teresa Martinez, daughter of a wealthy philanthropist running for Congress, is abducted for a ransom of $2 million. Lincoln notes that kidnappings are a "different animal" than murders, giving Amelia a new idea for how to expand her search for the Bone Collector. The team is able to deduce that a member of Martinez's campaign staff was involved with the kidnapping, but when they find her seriously injured, they learn that the real culprit is her half-brother, who's desperate to pay his gambling debts. Teresa's finger is sent as proof-of-life, and Kate analyzes it, revealing the factory where she's being held. Lincoln concocts a plan to use nitrogen gas to render the kidnappers unconscious, but one of them manages to remain awake; Sellitto is forced to shoot him dead. Teresa is rescued and returned to her father. Amelia uses old case files to find the name of a man kidnapped by the Bone Collector, James Asher, who managed to escape. She interviews him, learning the Collector's real name: Peter Taylor. Lincoln realizes that he met Taylor years earlier. The Collector, having learned of Asher's survival, spots him speaking with Amelia.
9	"Open Warfare"	Steve Shill	Justin Boyd & Jamey Perry	March 13, 2020	3.78
The team track the Bone Collector to his house, but only find the body of his wife and clues leading to a new game. They track the first clues to Lincoln's old gym, but find Cutter, dying of a fatal wound inflicted between the search of Taylor's house and her departure from Lincoln's apartment. Cutter sacrifices herself to set off the traps at the scene so that the team can retrieve the clues. As Lincoln's family come to visit, Castillo takes them to a safehouse, but the team soon realize that the second set of clues points to the hotel where Sellito had a wedding reception where Lincoln was best man. They find Sellitto alive on the hotel roof, but after finding only two clues, they realize that Sellitto is the third clue when he collapses of belladonna poisoning. Sachs realizes that the third clue relates to the diner where her parents were killed, but when she goes there, she sets off a bomb on a timer, while Lincoln and Claire are cornered by Peter Taylor.
10	"Mano a Mano"	Gary Fleder	Jon Cowan & Lauren Greer	March 13, 2020	3.44
Sachs is able to fake her death at the bomb site while Lincoln fakes a seizure to give Claire the chance to fight Taylor off. Once out of the hospital, Sellitto realizes that Taylor had a source in the department who tipped him off to their investigation, but when they track the source down, he has been tortured for his access to the department computer system, which includes records of the patrol car taking Naia and Camden to safety. Sachs and Sellitto arrive at the car in time to find Castillo just before he dies, but as they ponder their next move, Sellitto realizes that Castillo was able to pass on his smart watch to Naia before his death. With that new clue, the team manage to track Naia to a meat-packing plant, and then track Taylor to the warehouse where Lincoln was paralyzed. Lincoln is forced to go into the warehouse alone, rigged with Sachs' usual camera system, but he is able to get Taylor talking, where Taylor explains that he resents Lincoln because, while they were both at the academy, they both cracked the same test case at the same time, but Lincoln gave the lecturer the answer just before Taylor, literally shoving him aside. The team are able to disrupt Taylor's signal device before he can trigger the trapdoor to drop Camden, followed by Taylor stabbing himself with a paralytic when he tries to crush Lincoln's camera. At Castillo's memorial service, the team receive a package Taylor sent as his final clue, which contains a phone that rings when they find the package, the speaker proposing a new game before a woman drops off the roof to land on a nearby car.

== Production ==
=== Development ===
On January 17, 2019, it was announced that NBC had given the production a pilot order under the name Lincoln based on The Bone Collector novel. The pilot was written by VJ Boyd and Mark Bianculli who executive produces along with Avi Nir, Alon Shtruzman, Peter Traugott and Rachel Kaplan. Production companies involved with the pilot include Sony Pictures Television and Universal Television. On February 21, 2019, it was announced that Seth Gordon would direct the pilot.

On May 11, 2019, it was announced that the production had been given a series order. A few days later, it was announced that the series would premiere as a mid-season replacement in the mid-season of 2020. On November 8, 2019, NBC changed the title from Lincoln to Lincoln Rhyme: Hunt for the Bone Collector The series premiered on January 10, 2020. On June 10, 2020, NBC canceled the series after one season.

=== Casting ===
In March 2019, it was announced that Russell Hornsby, Michael Imperioli, Arielle Kebbel, Courtney Grosbeck, Ramses Jimenez, Brooke Lyons, Roslyn Ruff and Tate Ellington had joined the cast for their pilot lead roles.

== Reception ==
=== Critical response ===
On Rotten Tomatoes, the series holds an approval rating of 36% with an average rating of 5/10, based on 11 reviews. The website's critics consensus reads, "With as many narrative threads as words in its title, Lincoln Rhyme: Hunt for the Bone Collector buries a compelling Russell Hornsby in a pile of plot." On Metacritic, it has a weighted average score of 44 out of 100, based on 4 critics, indicating "mixed or average reviews".

=== Ratings ===
Viewership and ratings per episode of Lincoln Rhyme: Hunt for the Bone Collector
No.	Title	Air date	Rating/share (18–49)	Viewers (millions)	DVR (18–49)	DVR viewers (millions)	Total (18–49)	Total viewers (millions)
1	"Pilot"	January 10, 2020	0.6/4	4.37	—N/a	1.55	—N/a	5.80
2	"God Complex"	January 17, 2020	0.4/3	3.79	0.4	2.04	0.8	5.84
3	"Russian Roulette"	January 31, 2020	0.4	3.36	0.4	2.01	0.8	5.37
4	"What Lies Beneath"	February 7, 2020	0.4	3.64	0.4	2.04	0.8	5.68
5	"Game On"	February 14, 2020	0.4	3.45	—N/a	1.84	—N/a	5.29
6	"'Til Death Do Us Part"	February 21, 2020	0.4	3.57	0.4	1.95	0.8	5.52
7	"Requiem"	February 28, 2020	0.4	3.45	—N/a	1.86	—N/a	5.32
8	"Original Sin"	March 6, 2020	0.5	3.71	0.3	1.94	0.8	5.66
9	"Open Warfare"	March 13, 2020	0.6	3.78	—N/a	1.90	—N/a	5.68
10	"Mano a Mano"	March 13, 2020	0.5	3.44	0.3	2.08	0.8	5.52
