= Bookends (film) =

- Directed by: Mike Doyle
- Written by: Noam Ash
- Produced by: Scott Einbinder; Alon Shtruzman; Noam Ash; Henry Russell Bergstein
- Starring: F. Murray Abraham; Caroline Aaron; Noam Ash; Charlie Barnett
- Production company: 5X Media
- Release date: February 9, 2026 (SBIFF)
- Country: United States
- Language: English

Bookends is a 2026 American comedy-drama film directed by Mike Doyle and written by Noam Ash. The film stars F. Murray Abraham, Caroline Aaron, and Charlie Barnett.

== Plot ==
The story follows Nate, a millennial novelist who, after a painful breakup, is forced to leave his city life behind and moves in with his grandparents. When his grandfather, Saul, a Holocaust survivor, begins to show signs of cognitive decline and his grandmother, Miriam, refuses to acknowledge the early symptoms of her husband's dementia, Nate finds himself torn between trying to reclaim his former life, fulfilling family responsibilities, and an unexpected romance with his grandparents' handsome doctor.

== Cast ==
- F. Murray Abraham as Saul, Nate's grandfather and a Holocaust survivor.
- Caroline Aaron as Miriam, Nate's grandmother.
- Noam Ash as Nate.
- Charlie Barnett as Dr. Daniel Green, Nate's love interest.
- Other cast members include Jared Reinfeldt, Frank Aiello, Jazelle Villanueva, Spencer Belko, Virginia Kirby, and Grant Gabel.

== Production ==
Bookends is inspired by writer Noam Ash's personal experience of living with his grandparents. The film was produced by 5X Media and shot on location in Columbus and New York City.

The film was produced by Scott Einbinder, Alon Shtruzman, Noam Ash, Warren Ostergard and Henry Russell Bergstein.

== Release ==
The film premiered at the Santa Barbara International Film Festival on February 9, 2026, where it was ranked an audience favorite and won the festival's prestigious Stand Up Award.
