= Mark Boal =

American screenwriter (born 1973)

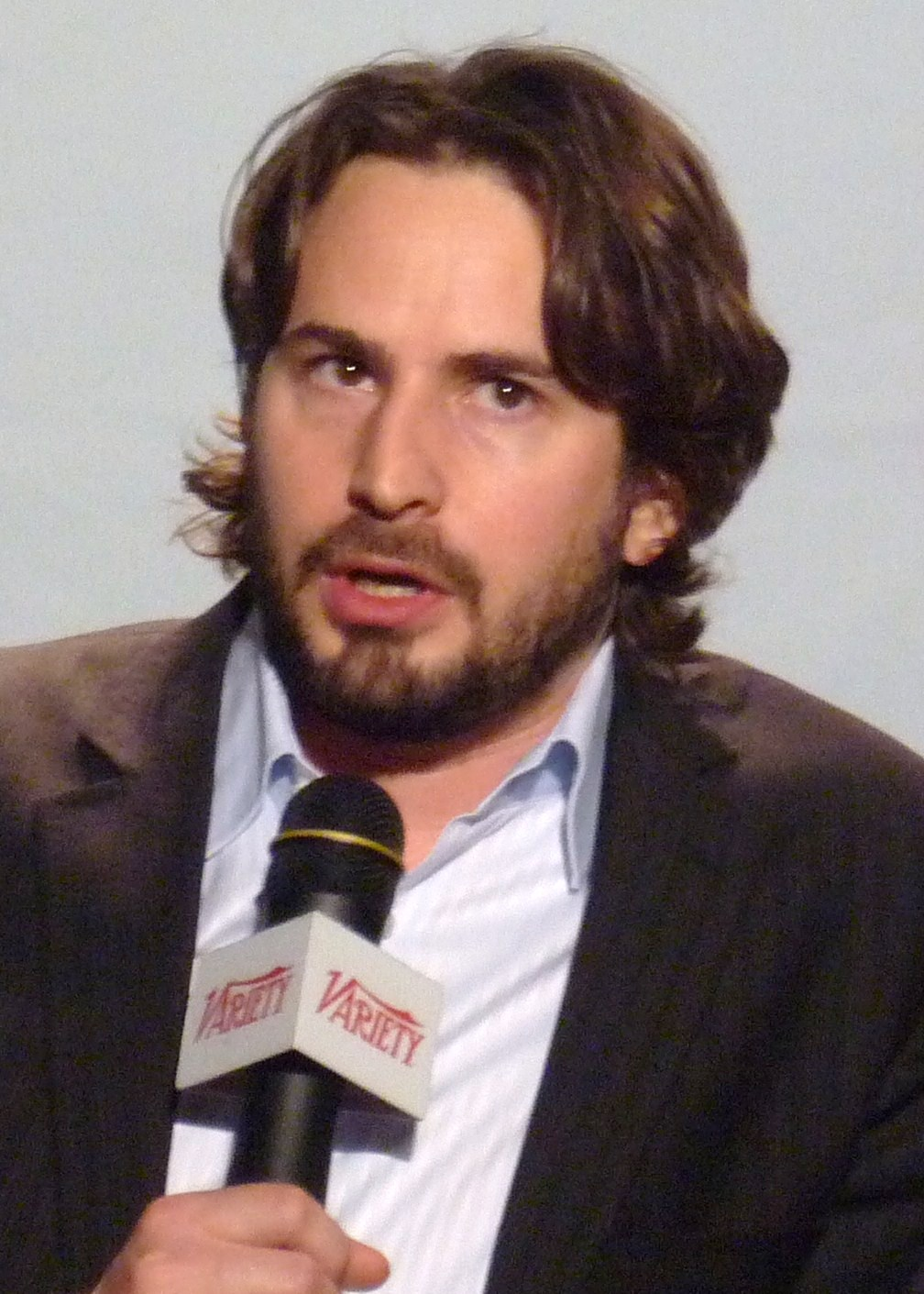
- Boal in 2012
- Born: January 23, 1973 (age 53); New York City, U.S.
- Education: Oberlin College (1995)
- Occupations: Journalist, screenwriter, film producer
- Relatives: Christopher Stetson Boal (half-brother)

Mark Boal (born January 23, 1973) is an American journalist, screenwriter, and film producer. Boal initially worked as a journalist, writing for outlets like Rolling Stone, The Village Voice, Salon, and Playboy. Boal's 2004 article "Death and Dishonor" was adapted for the film In the Valley of Elah, which Boal also co-wrote.

In 2008, he wrote and produced The Hurt Locker, for which he won both the Academy Award for Best Original Screenplay and the Academy Award for Best Picture. In 2012 he wrote and produced Zero Dark Thirty, teaming again with director Kathryn Bigelow, about the tracking and killing of Osama bin Laden. The film earned him Academy Award nominations for Best Original Screenplay and Best Picture and a Writers Guild of America Award for Best Original Screenplay. The pair collaborated a third time for 2017's Detroit.

Boal has won two Academy Awards (with another two nominations), a BAFTA Award, two Writers Guild of America Awards, and a Producers Guild of America Award, and also has four Golden Globe Award nominations.

== Early life ==
Mark Boal was born on January 23, 1973, in New York City, the son of Lillian Firestone and William Stetson Boal, Jr., a producer of educational films. His half–brother is Christopher Stetson Boal, a playwright and screenwriter. His mother was born to a Jewish family and his father converted to Judaism. Boal attended Bronx High School of Science and was on the high school's Speech and Debate Team. He earned his undergraduate degree in Philosophy from Oberlin College in 1995.

== Career ==
Boal has worked as a freelance journalist and screenwriter. He has contributed articles to such magazines as The Village Voice, Salon, Rolling Stone and Playboy.

Boal's 2004 article "Death and Dishonor", about the 2003 murder of veteran Richard T. Davis after his return to the United States, was published in Playboy magazine. It inspired writer/director Paul Haggis, who adapted it for his fictional screenplay as the film In the Valley of Elah, which he also directed. Boal and Haggis have writing credit for the story.

As a journalist, Boal was embedded with troops and bomb squads in 2004 during the Iraq War. He wrote an article about one of the bomb experts, Sergeant Jeffrey S. Sarver, in an article entitled, "The Man in the Bomb Suit", published in September 2005 in Playboy magazine.

Boal went on to write an original screenplay, titled The Hurt Locker, about a fictional set of characters and events based on his interviews and observations in Iraq. He was also a producer for the 2009 film adaptation set in Iraq, about a U.S. Army Explosive Ordnance Disposal (EOD) bomb squad. The film was directed by Kathryn Bigelow, his business partner and co-producer.

In March 2010 (five days before the Academy Awards ceremony), Master Sergeant Jeffrey S. Sarver announced he was suing the producers of The Hurt Locker because Boal allegedly based the main character and "virtually all of the situations" in the film on events involving him. Sarver also claimed to have coined the phrase "the hurt locker".

The producers' spokesperson has reiterated that the screenplay is fictional. Citations for the phrase, "the hurt locker", date back to 1966 during the years of the Vietnam War. The phrase has been used among military members for decades. In the December 8, 2011 issue of The Hollywood Reporter, it was reported that Sarver's lawsuit was thrown out by the court, and a federal judge ordered him to pay more than $180,000 in attorney fees.

In March 2011, Boal published an article in Rolling Stone about the Maywand District murders titled: The Kill Team: How U.S. Soldiers in Afghanistan Murdered Innocent Civilians.

Boal wrote the film Zero Dark Thirty, which was released in December 2012. The film opened to much critical acclaim. Some commentators criticized its implication that torture revealed evidence that strongly contributed to the capture of bin Laden. Others, who deemed the production design inaccurate and oversimplified, criticized the film for its depiction of Pakistan, and found the Arabic–speaking locals in the film (Pakistan's national language is Urdu) to be problematic.

Boal was nominated for the Academy Award for Best Original Screenplay and the film was nominated for the Academy Award for Best Picture. He lost to Quentin Tarantino who was nominated for Django Unchained. Boal was nominated for Writing in a Drama by the National Academy of Video Game Trade Reviewers for his work on Call of Duty: Advanced Warfare.

In 2021, it was announced that Boal was in negotiations with Netflix to write a film based on the GameStop short squeeze of January 2021.

== Filmography ==
=== Film ===
Year	Film	Credit	Notes
2007	In the Valley of Elah	Story by	Co-wrote story with Paul Haggis
2009	The Hurt Locker	Written by Producer	
2012	Zero Dark Thirty	Written by Producer	
2013	After Earth	Script consultant	
2017	Detroit	Written by Producer	
2019	Triple Frontier	Screenplay by Story by Executive producer	Co-screenwriter with J. C. Chandor

=== Television ===
Year	Title	Credit	Notes
2018	Class of Lies	Executive producer	
2022	Echo 3	Creator, writer, director, executive producer	Wrote 6 episodes, directed 3 episodes

=== Video games ===
Year	Game	Credit	Notes
2014	Call of Duty: Advanced Warfare	Story by	

== Awards ==
- The Hurt Locker (2009) – Academy Award for Best Writing (Original Screenplay)
- The Hurt Locker (2009) – Academy Award for Best Picture
- The Hurt Locker (2009) – BAFTA Award for Best Original Screenplay
- The Hurt Locker (2009) – Writers Guild of America Award for Best Original Screenplay
- The Hurt Locker (2009) – Chicago Film Critics Association Award for Best Original Screenplay
- The Hurt Locker (2009) – Nantucket International Film Festival – "The Showtime Tony Cox Award" for Screenwriting
- The Hurt Locker (2009) – Nominated – Satellite Award for Best Original Screenplay
- The Hurt Locker (2009) – Nominated – Golden Globe Award for Best Screenplay
- Zero Dark Thirty (2012) – Top 10 Film–American Film Institute Awards
- Zero Dark Thirty (2012) – Alliance of Women Film Journalists Award for Best Screenplay, Original
- Zero Dark Thirty (2012) – Alliance of Women Film Journalists Award for Best Picture
- Zero Dark Thirty (2012) – Austin Film Critics Association for Best Film
- Zero Dark Thirty (2012) – Boston Society of Film Critics Award for Best Film
- Zero Dark Thirty (2012) – Chicago Film Critics Association Award for Best Picture
- Zero Dark Thirty (2012) – Chicago Film Critics Association Award for Best Original Screenplay
- Zero Dark Thirty (2012) – Dallas–Fort Worth Film Critics Association Award for Best Screenplay
- Zero Dark Thirty (2012) – 2nd place–Las Vegas Film Critics Society Award for Best Film
- Zero Dark Thirty (2012) – National Board of Review Award for Best Film
- Zero Dark Thirty (2012) – 3rd place–National Society of Film Critics Award for Best Film
- Zero Dark Thirty (2012) – New York Film Critics Circle Award for Best Film
- Zero Dark Thirty (2012) – New York Film Critics Online Award for Best Picture
- Zero Dark Thirty (2012) – New York Film Critics OnlineAward for Best Screenplay
- Zero Dark Thirty (2012) – 2nd place–Oklahoma Film Critics Circle Award for Best Film
- Zero Dark Thirty (2012) – San Francisco Film Critics Circle Award for Best Screenplay
- Zero Dark Thirty (2012) – Satellite Award for Best Original Screenplay
- Zero Dark Thirty (2012) – Runner–up Southeastern Film Critics Association Award for Best Original Screenplay
- Zero Dark Thirty (2012) – Runner–up Southeastern Film Critics Association Award for Best Film
- Zero Dark Thirty (2012) – Runner–up Southeastern Film Critics Association Award for Best Original Screenplay
- Zero Dark Thirty (2012) – St. Louis Film Critics Association Award for Best Original Screenplay
- Zero Dark Thirty (2012) – Runner–up Toronto Film Critics Association Award for Best Film
- Zero Dark Thirty (2012) – Runner–up Toronto Film Critics Association Award for Best Screenplay
- Zero Dark Thirty (2012) – Vancouver Film Critics Circle Award for Best Film
- Zero Dark Thirty (2012) – Vancouver Film Critics Circle Award for Best Screenplay
- Zero Dark Thirty (2012) – Washington D.C. Area Film Critics Association Award for Best Film
- Zero Dark Thirty (2012) – Writers Guild of America Award for Best Original Screenplay
- Zero Dark Thirty (2012) – Nominated – AACTA International Award for Best Film
- Zero Dark Thirty (2012) – Nominated – AACTA International Award for Best Screenplay
- Zero Dark Thirty (2012) – Nominated – Academy Award for Best Writing (Original Screenplay)
- Zero Dark Thirty (2012) – Nominated – Academy Award for Best Picture
- Zero Dark Thirty (2012) – Nominated – BAFTA Award for Best Original Screenplay
- Zero Dark Thirty (2012) – Nominated – BAFTA Award for Best Film
- Zero Dark Thirty (2012) – Nominated – Broadcast Film Critics Association Award for Best Picture
- Zero Dark Thirty (2012) – Nominated – Broadcast Film Critics Association Award for Best Original Screenplay
- Zero Dark Thirty (2012) – Nominated – Golden Globe Award for Best Screenplay
- Zero Dark Thirty (2012) – Nominated – Golden Globe Award for Best Motion Picture – Drama
- Zero Dark Thirty (2012) – Nominated – Houston Film Critics Society Award for Best Screenplay
- Zero Dark Thirty (2012) – Nominated – Houston Film Critics Society Award for Best Picture
- Zero Dark Thirty (2012) – Nominated – London Film Critics' Circle for Screenwriter of the Year
- Zero Dark Thirty (2012) – Nominated – Online Film Critics Society Award for Best Original Screenplay
- Zero Dark Thirty (2012) – Nominated – Online Film Critics Society Award for Best Picture
- Zero Dark Thirty (2012) – Nominated – Producers Guild of America Award for Best Theatrical Motion Picture
- Zero Dark Thirty (2012) – Nominated – Satellite Award for Best Film
- Zero Dark Thirty (2012) – Nominated – St. Louis Film Critics Association Award for Best Film
