= The Baker and the Beauty (American TV series) =

2020 American romantic comedy-drama television series

- Genre: Romantic comedy drama
- Based on: Beauty and the Baker by Assi Azar
- Developed by: Dean Georgaris
- Starring: Victor Rasuk; Nathalie Kelley; Dan Bucatinsky; David Del Río; Michelle Veintimilla; Belissa Escobedo; Lisa Vidal; Carlos Gómez
- Music by: Siddhartha Khosla; Joachim Horsley
- Country of origin: United States
- Original languages: English; Spanish
- No. of seasons: 1
- No. of episodes: 9

Production
- Executive producers: James Chory; David Frankel; Becky Hartman Edwards; Peter Traugott; Rachel Kaplan; Assi Azar; Avi Nir; Alon Shtruzman; Elad Kuperman; Dean Georgaris; Steve Pearlman
- Producers: Nick Pavonetti; Victor Rasuk; Nathalie Kelley
- Cinematography: Florian Ballhaus; Brian J Reynolds
- Editors: Elena Maganini; Jennifer Hatton; Leon Martin; Scott Boyd
- Running time: 40–43 minutes
- Production companies: Dean Georgaris Entertainment 2.0; Keshet Studios; ABC Studios; Universal Television

Original release
- Network: ABC
- Release: April 13 – June 1, 2020

The Baker and the Beauty is an American romantic comedy-drama television series developed by Dean Georgaris that premiered on American Broadcasting Company on April 13, 2020 to June 1, 2020. It is an adaptation of the Israeli romantic-comedy series Beauty and the Baker. The original version is one of the highest-rated scripted series ever in Israel, and its episodes have been streamed on Amazon Prime Video. The American version is developed and executive-produced by Dean Georgaris, Becky Hartman Edwards, David Frankel, Avi Nir, Alon Shtruzman, Peter Traugott, Assi Azar and Rachel Kaplan for Universal Television. In June 2020, it was canceled after one season.

After its cancellation, in April 2021, the series rose to prominence on Netflix, where it entered the weekly TV viewership charts, peaking at number one.

== Cast ==
=== Main ===
- Victor Rasuk as Daniel Garcia, a baker at his family's business, Rafael's Bakery, who enters a whirlwind romance with supermodel Noa Hamilton
- Nathalie Kelley as Noa Hamilton, a famous Australian model and entrepreneur attracted to Daniel
- Dan Bucatinsky as Lewis, Noa's manager who seeks to protect her image at all costs
- David Del Río as Mateo Garcia, Daniel's younger brother and a DJ known as MC Cubano.
- Michelle Veintimilla as Vanessa a realtor and Daniel's ex-girlfriend
- Belissa Escobedo as Natalie, Daniel and Mateo's younger sister who has high expectations placed on her by her parents
- Lisa Vidal as Mari Garcia, Daniel's, Mateo's and Natalie's mother
- Carlos Gómez as Rafael Garcia, Daniel's, Mateo's and Natalie's father, and the owner of Rafael's Bakery

=== Recurring ===
- Georgina Reilly as Piper, Noa's best friend and part of her entourage, who supports Noa's and Daniel's relationship
- Madelyn Sher as Amy, Natalie's love interest

== Episodes ==
| No. | Title | Directed by | Teleplay by | Original release date | U.S. viewers (millions) |
|---|---|---|---|---|---|
| 1 | "Pilot" | David Frankel | Dean Georgaris | April 13, 2020 | 2.66 |
On the night of his fourth anniversary, Daniel Garcia runs into Noa Hamilton, a famous Australian model, shortly before his girlfriend, Vanessa, dumps him when he refuses her marriage proposal. Noa, claiming she feels bad for him, picks Daniel up and offers him "three wishes" for the night. Daniel uses his first wish to ask for a clean shirt. They visit a restaurant owned by Noa's friend, where the two begin to realize how attracted they are to each other. Daniel uses his second wish, which was to have Noa call his little sister, Natalie, and offer her advice on how to handle starting a new school. While at a club, Noa's ex-boyfriend, Colin Davis, tries to win her back. Her manager, Lewis, reveals to Daniel that Noa has a history of fooling around with strangers, and that she doesn't really love him. Daniel leaves in disgust and walks home, but discovers the next day that his family's bakery has dozens of new customers after Noa gave them a shout-out on social media. He then finds Noa waiting for him outside, saying she still owes him a third wish.
| 2 | "Ruin My Life" | David Frankel; Steve Pearlman | Dean Georgaris & Becky Hartman Edwards | April 20, 2020 | 2.82 |
To make up for yesterday, Noa invites Daniel to her birthday party. Things quickly become complicated when Vanessa tracks him down and asks him to meet her for a date. A food critic places a large order at the bakery. While preparing it, the oven breaks and the family is able to finish only part of the order. The critic is impressed nonetheless and decides to give the bakery a good review. Natalie meets Amy, a fellow student, while out shopping. Daniel is about to leave for his date when Piper asks him to stay, as Noa needs a shoulder to cry on since she hates her birthday due to her father never showing up and her mentally-incapacitated mother being unable to attend. Daniel takes her to the beach, where they skinny-dip and kiss. Noa asks Daniel to come with her next week to Puerto Rico. Vanessa, enraged that Daniel stood her up and convinced that she can force him to return to her, starts plotting a plan to ruin his new relationship.
| 3 | "Get Carried Away" | Joanna Kerns | Valentina L. Garza | April 27, 2020 | 2.46 |
Daniel accompanies Noa on a charity trip to Puerto Rico, but they still have to keep their relationship a secret. During lunch, they meet a local street food chef named Ruben. Noa films Daniel's conversation with Ruben. Later, Noa has a meeting with a director, Melanie Caan, who offers her a role in her new movie. However, it's revealed that Colin is also starring in the movie and that he's the one who got her the part. After seeing Colin talking to Daniel, Noa decides not to take the role. Due to a broken water main, Noa and her team are forced to find a new venue and new caterers for Noa's charity gala. With Daniel's help, they're able to move the gala outdoors and get Ruben to help them by having local street food at the gala. Vanessa helps Mateo land a gig as a DJ. Mari invites Amy over for dinner. Natalie and Amy almost share a kiss, but Natalie freaks out and sends Amy away. Noa and Daniel sneak away from the gala and kiss when they think they're alone, but don't realize that someone is taking pictures of them.
| 4 | "I Think She's Coming Out" | Erica Dunton | Albert Torres | May 4, 2020 | 2.28 |
After being caught sneaking pastries out of the bakery for the last few weeks, Daniel's family insists that Noa comes over for dinner to meet them. Noa excitedly agrees and the family goes into overdrive trying to make things perfect, with Mateo bailing on his gig set up by Vanessa and Natalie inviting Amy over to join them (as they had been preparing to go to the movies that night). Initially, the dinner goes smoothly, until Noa inadvertently outs Natalie to the entire family, followed by Vanessa showing up to bring Mateo soup after the latter faked a sore throat to get out of his gig. She is furious that Noa was invited to dinner, prompting Daniel to go and talk her down. He says that his love for Noa is not just a fantasy, and that he and Vanessa will never be happily ever after. Meanwhile, as Noa goes to leave, she discovers that the paparazzi have found out her location which was given away by Lewis, who was on a date and was overheard by his waiter. Rafael sneaks Noa and Daniel out, but a tabloid reporter catches them. Weighing their options, Daniel and Noa decide to go public with their relationship.
| 5 | "Honeymoon's Over" | Jay Karas | Sasha Stroman | May 11, 2020 | 2.35 |
Noa and Daniel's relationship has gone public. Mari struggles with Natalie's sexuality. Lewis approaches Vanessa and tries to bribe her into signing a non-disclosure agreement. She refuses and sends Daniel a text accusing him of trying to buy her off. Daniel angrily confronts Lewis, telling him how insulting this must be for Vanessa. Daniel asks Noa if she's okay the way Lewis is handling the situation and they have a fight. Later, both apologize and promise to try and adjust to each other's lifestyles. Noa sets up a meeting with the Food Channel for Daniel after sending them his video with Ruben, but the producers seem to be more interested in Noa and Daniel's relationship than Daniel's vision for a TV show. Melanie Caan offers Noa the lead role in her next movie, which is shooting for three months in Morocco. Noa asks Daniel to come with her to Morocco. Kurt, a journalist, approaches Vanessa and reveals to her that Daniel and Noa had actually met shortly before Vanessa's proposal, which angers her.
| 6 | "Side Effects" | Steve Pearlman | Written by : Christina Quintana & Michael V. Ross | May 18, 2020 | 2.28 |
Vanessa agrees to sit down for an interview with Kurt Mallick, which raises questions regarding the circumstances of Vanessa and Daniel's break-up. This is all televised live during an interview regarding Noa's upcoming role in Melanie Caan's film, painting Noa as an intruder in Daniel's previous relationship. At the same time, the press coverage of the incident causes Natalie problems at school, resulting in her suspension following a physical altercation with another student. After discovering that Amy has faced disciplinary actions in the past, Mari forbids Natalie from seeing her. Meanwhile, Mateo gives up music after his meeting with a prominent music producer reveals that he really wanted to work with Vanessa. Mari and Rafael discover the construction company they hired to expand the bakery was a scam. They subsequently discover asbestos in the bakery's walls, resulting in temporary closure. After Daniel reveals to his family that he will be leaving for Morocco to support Noa's film career, he is confronted by Kurt Mallick, whom he assaults after he makes a snide remark about Noa, who discovers that her father, whom she was emancipated at 16 years old, is trying to take her company from her. Noa confides in Daniel that she must handle this on her own.
| 7 | "Blow Out" | Mark Polish | Written by : William Harper | May 25, 2020 | 2.24 |
In the aftermath of the recent & tumultuous events, the Garcia family is in shambles. Daniel is arrested after assaulting Kurt Mallick, Mateo gives up on his music, and Natalie defies her parents by skipping school to go to a music festival with Amy, despite her mother's warning to stay away from her. Meanwhile, Noa's father uses Daniel's recent arrest as leverage to convince her shareholders to transfer control of her company to him. Lewis talks to Noa's father, who admits that recent financial troubles with clients in Singapore is the main reason he wants to gain control of the company away from his daughter. Vanessa convinces Kurt to drop the charges against Daniel, and the two are able to amicably mend their broken relationship. Noa's father concedes his hostile takeover, and Noa discovers Lewis' medical situation regarding his diagnosis of prostate cancer. Natalie and Mari reconcile after Mari tells Natalie of how her last words to her mother were ones of contempt. Daniel and Noa meet up after everything, where Noa tells Daniel that they should not see each other anymore given all the strife that their relationship has caused both of them. Angered that everything they went through was all in vain, Daniel solemnly walks away from Noa.
| 8 | "May I Have This Dance?" | Melanie Mayron | Written by : Terrence Coli | June 1, 2020 | 2.71 |
Rafael and Mari are having problems playing their bills, so Rafael decides to cancel Natalie's quinceanera. Natalie turns to Noa for help but Rafael refuses to take Noa's money. Daniel convinces Rafael to accept Noa's money and they throw a big quinceanera for Natalie. Mateo invites Vanessa to the quinceanera and she decides to invite Marlow, a music producer, to hear Mateo's music live. Marlow agrees to go as long as Vanessa will be his date. Mateo gets jealous when he sees Vanessa and Marlow at the quinceanera. Mateo confronts Vanessa afterwards and the two end up having sex. Daniel and Noa see each other again for the first time after their breakup. Noa asks Daniel if there's any chance of them ever getting back together, but Daniel tells Noa he likes his life better now that they've broken up, since he's no longer getting harassed by paparazzi. The next day, Daniel is offered a job by food critic Thomas Gold, who has seen his food critic videos.
| 9 | "You Can't Always Get What You Want" | Steve Pearlman | Written by : Valentina L. Garza | June 1, 2020 | 2.71 |
Noa makes amends with Colin and tells him about her breakup with Daniel. He suggests to her they go to Morocco prior to the start of production on Melanie Caan's film, so they can prep and maybe figure out if there's still a future for them. Noa agrees and they make plans to leave that evening. Daniel, who is thinking about accepting Thomas Gold's job offer, begins to wonder if he made a mistake turning Noa down. However, when he tries to meet her at her office he sees her hugging Colin and walks away without talking to her. Rafael and Mari are approached by Rick Jameson, a property investor, who wants to buy the bakery. Natalie finds out that Jameson works for a billion-dollar real estate trust, which plans to remove local businesses from the area and bring in national chains. Daniel gets a call from Lewis, who encourages him to get over to Noa's office before she leaves for Morocco. Daniel and Mateo make their way to Noa's office, but by the time they get there it's too late because Noa has already left for the airport. Daniel doesn't make it to the gate in time, but Noa, who had been rethinking her trip, had already decided to get off the plane. Noa and Daniel run into each other outside of the airport and they share a kiss. Rafael and Mari decide not to sell the bakery. Later, Noa and Daniel reveal that they're now engaged.

== Production ==
=== Development ===
In November 2018, it was announced that an adaptation of the series was being developed by Dean Georgaris and David Frankel through Keshet Studios and Universal Television for ABC. The series is one of two collaborations between Georgaris and Universal for the 2019–20 season, along with Bluff City Law for NBC's fall schedule. Georgaris and Frankel are set to write and direct, respectively, and both will executive produce alongside Avi Nir, Alon Shtruzman, Peter Traugott, and Rachel Kaplan. In January 2019 ABC ordered the adaptation to pilot. On May 11, 2019, ABC green-lighted the series. A few days later, it was announced that the series would premiere as a mid-season replacement in the spring of 2020. On January 8, 2020, it was reported that the series was set to premiere on April 6, 2020. On January 29, 2020, the premiere date was moved to April 13, 2020. On June 15, 2020, ABC canceled the series after one season.

=== Casting ===
In February 2019, it was announced that Carlos Gomez, Lisa Vidal and Dan Bucatinsky had been cast in the pilot's lead roles. Alongside the pilot's order announcement, in March 2019 it was reported that Nathalie Kelley, Victor Rasuk, Michelle Veintimilla and David Del Rio had joined the cast. In September 2019, Georgina Reilly was cast in a recurring role.

=== Filming ===
The pilot was filmed in Atlanta while rest of the series was filmed in Puerto Rico.

== Reception ==
=== Critical response ===
On Rotten Tomatoes, the series holds an approval rating of 89% based on 9 reviews, with an average rating of 6.8/10.

=== Ratings ===
Viewership and ratings per episode of The Baker and the Beauty
| No. | Title | Air date | Rating (18–49) | Viewers (millions) | DVR (18–49) | DVR viewers (millions) | Total (18–49) | Total viewers (millions) |
|---|---|---|---|---|---|---|---|---|
| 1 | "Pilot" | April 13, 2020 | 0.5 | 2.66 | 0.2 | 1.25 | 0.7 | 3.92 |
| 2 | "Ruin My Life" | April 20, 2020 | 0.5 | 2.82 | 0.3 | 1.42 | 0.9 | 4.24 |
| 3 | "Get Carried Away" | April 27, 2020 | 0.5 | 2.46 | 0.3 | 1.33 | 0.7 | 3.79 |
| 4 | "I Think She's Coming Out" | May 4, 2020 | 0.5 | 2.28 | 0.4 | 1.31 | 0.7 | 3.70 |
| 5 | "Honeymoon's Over" | May 11, 2020 | 0.4 | 2.35 | 0.3 | 1.33 | 0.7 | 3.67 |
| 6 | "Side Effects" | May 18, 2020 | 0.4 | 2.28 | 0.3 | 1.35 | 0.7 | 3.62 |
| 7 | "Blow Out" | May 25, 2020 | 0.4 | 2.24 | 0.3 | 1.33 | 0.7 | 3.56 |
| 8 | "May I Have This Dance?" | June 1, 2020 | 0.5 | 2.71 | 0.2 | 1.18 | 0.7 | 3.87 |
| 9 | "You Can't Always Get What You Want" | June 1, 2020 | 0.5 | 2.71 | 0.2 | 1.18 | 0.7 | 3.87 |
