= C. Quintana =

American playwright and poet

CQ Quintana
- Education: College of Santa Fe (BA); Columbia University (MFA)
- Website: Official website

CQ Quintana (also known as C. Quintana and previously known as Christina Quintana) is a Cuban-American playwright, poet, and writer. Her (Note: Quintana uses all/any pronouns. This article uses she/her for consistency.) works have been published in literary journals and produced across the United States. Quintana's full-length audio play The 126-Year Old Artist is available via Audible, published in 2023, Scissoring, another full-length play, was published and licensed by Dramatists Play Service in 2019, and The Heart Wants, her chapbook of poetry, was published in 2016 by Finishing Line Press.

== Education and career ==
Quintana attended Ursuline Academy New Orleans and the New Orleans Center for Creative Arts, a performing-arts high school. She graduated from College of Santa Fe in 2010 with a degree in theatre and a minor in creative writing. Under the guidance of Charles Mee, she earned an MFA in Playwriting from Columbia University School of the Arts.

Quintana is the founder of QuintanaTown Consulting, a writing consultancy for the support and development of scripts and creative writing projects. She founded the Live Lunch Series in 2014, a project aiming to bring theatre to workplaces during lunch. The project premiered at the Andrew W. Mellon Foundation and expanded to The Fortune Society, an organization that helps previously incarcerated people integrate into society.

Much of her writing revolves around themes of injustice, loss, queerness, and marginalized identities. At her website, she self-identifies as "a queer writer with Cuban and Louisiana roots," and says she "tells stories that mine the misconception of dissimilarity and proclaim, 'You are not alone.'"

== Personal life ==
Quintana, who is nonbinary and gender non-conforming, changed her professional listing from Christina to C. in 2022. She goes by CQ and legally petitioned for this name change in 2023.

== Books ==
- The 126-Year Old Artist. Audible Originals.
- Scissoring. Concord Theatricals/Dramatists Play Service. 15 March 2019. ISBN 9780822239567.
- Beckford-Burrell, Bleu; Swirsky, Stephanie; Quintana, C. (2022). The Keen Collection: One-acts by Contemporary Playwrights. Concord Theatricals. ISBN 9780573710148.
- TRW Presents: Short Plays, Vol. 3. Theatrical Rights Worldwide.

== Awards ==
Quintana is the recipient of numerous awards and fellowships for her writing:

- 2014 Lambda Literary Emerging Voices Fellow in Fiction
- 2017 Van Lier New Voices Fellowship
- 2017 Arch & Bruce Brown Playwriting Competition – Honorable Mention: Azul
- 2017-18 New York's Playwrights Realm writing fellowship recipient
- 2018 MacDowell Fellowship
- 2021 Audible Emerging Playwrights Commission ("The 126-Year Old Artist")
- 2022 Café Royal Cultural Foundation Fellowship in Literature ("The Twisted Fate of La Media Luna")
- 2023 Carthage College New Play Initiative Commission ("The Genderless Play Experiment")
- 2022-2023 New York State Council on the Arts/INTAR Artist Commission ("End of Play")
- 2023-2024 Life Jacket Theatre Company Trans* Playwriting Commission ("Joyful Joyfriends")

== Plays ==
- Enter Your Sleep (2012): Productions with Elm Theatre New Orleans, Baby Crow Productions, and Yale Cabaret
- Blank Canvas (2014): Production (awarded "Best Short") in the 12th annual Downtown Urban Theater Festival
- Scissoring (2014): World Premiere at INTAR (2018); staged reading (2014) at the Alliance Theatre
- Three Thousand Seizures (2015): Semifinalist for Southern Rep Ruby Prize
- Evensong (2016): World Premiere at Astoria Performing Arts Center
- The Great Lonely Roamer & The Night that Changed Everything (2016): Workshop Production in NYU Voices Festival
- Citizen Scientist (2018): Public reading at the 2018 First Light Festival, hosted by the EST/Sloan Project (commission)
- Mr. San Man (2018): Studio Retreat and public readings at the Lark Theatre
- Azul (2019, 2021): Southern Rep, Diversionary Theatre Company
- Beastgirl (with music by Janelle Lawrence | adapted from the chapbook by Elizabeth Acevedo) (2022): Kennedy Center for the Performing Arts Studio K
- The 126-Year-Old Artist (2023): Audible
- The Genderless Play Experiment (2023, 2024): Carthage College New Play Initiative, KCACTF Region III

== Filmography ==
Year	Title	Notes
2020	The Baker and the Beauty	Episode: "Side Effects"
2024–2025	Alert: Missing Persons Unit	2 episodes
2024	Orphan Black: Echoes	2 episodes
