= List of programs broadcast by Keshet International =

The following programs are distributed by Keshet International.

== Comedy ==
- Arab Labor (Avoda Aravit)
- The Baker and the Beauty (Lihiot ita)
- Bobby & Me
- Easy Money
- Fox Force
- Honey Africa
- House Arrest
- Military Base 22
- Mother’s Day (Yom Haem)
- Polishuk
- Traffic Light (Ramzor)
- Your Family or Mine (Savri Maranan)

== Drama ==
- The A Word (Pilpelim Tsehubim)
- Custody
- Devout Love
- Dig
- Hit and Run
- Light and Truth
- Loaded (Mesudarim)
- Mice
- Musical High
- Mythological Ex
- Prisoners of War (Hatufim)

== Entertainment ==
- Babe Magnet
- The Big Ten
- Face2Face
- Master Class (Bit sefer lemuzika)
- Not a Star Yet
- Play/Record
- Rising Star (HaKokhav HaBa)
- Rising Star (U.S.)
- The Successor
- What a Wonderful Country (Eretz Nehederet)
- You Must be Joking

== Factual entertainment ==
- Dear Neighbors
- Fair & Square
- The Recipe
- Remember Me?
- Six Lessons On...
- The Ten Commandments
- Uvda
- We’ll Always be Mom & Dad
- What’s This Bullshit?!
- Whose Closet is it Anyway?

== Game shows ==
- 50 Things you Have to Know
- All Together Now
- Boom!
- Checkout
- Clockwise
- Deal with It!
- Heaven or Hell
- Honey, Please!
- The Late Night Game Show
- Mind Games
- Pick a Pocket
- Sure or Insure
- The Vault

== Reality ==
- The E Team
- Girlfri3nds
- Help! I Can’t Cook
- Love
- Love Lab
- Marathon
- Simon
- Undercover Chef
