= Dudu Topaz =

Israeli TV personality, comedian and actor

- דודו טופז
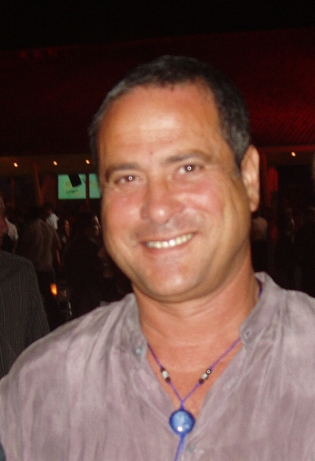
- Dudu Topaz on June 1, 2009
- Born: David Goldenberg; September 20, 1946; Haifa, Mandatory Palestine
- Died: August 20, 2009 (aged 62); Nitzan Detention Center, Ramla, Israel
- Occupations: Actor and TV personality

Dudu Topaz (Hebrew: דודו טופז; September 20, 1946 – August 20, 2009) (born David Goldenberg) was an Israeli TV personality, comedian, actor, screenwriter, playwright, author and radio and television host. In August 2009 he died by suicide while incarcerated, having been criminally charged with conspiring violence against prominent media figures in Israel.

== Biography ==
David Goldenberg, later Dudu Topaz, was born in Haifa, in then British Mandate of Palestine (now Israel) to Lilly and Eliyahu Goldenberg. His father was a radio announcer, actor and director. After his army service, Topaz studied acting in London. Upon his return, he performed with the Haifa Theatre and appeared in entertainment shows around the country. Topaz was married two times and had three sons.

== Entertainment career ==
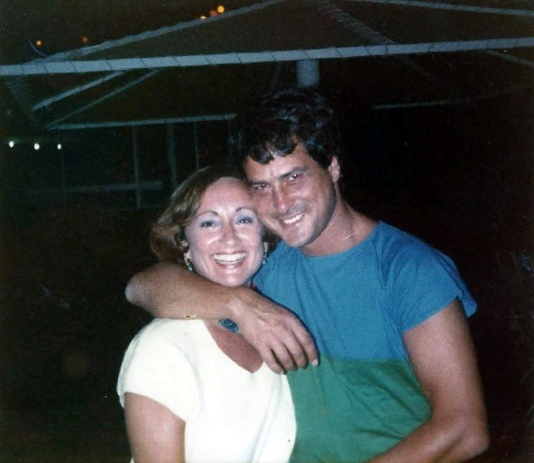
Topaz with radio producer Rachel Haramati at Kol Israel radio, Tel Aviv (1984)

In the 1970s, he took part in an Israeli radio show called "לצון נופל על לצון" (loosely: "A prankster falls for a prank"). His first job in television was as an English teacher in the Israeli Educational Television. In the early eighties Topaz began to direct television game shows in Channel 1. The most successful of those was the game show "Play It" (שחק אותה). Topaz was a television host in the Israeli public TV Channel 1 in the eighties and early nineties, as well as running some successful sketch comedy shows on stage.

In the nineties he was the host of popular show "Rashut Habidur" (The Entertainment Authority), later renamed "Ha'Rishon Ba'Bidur" (The First at entertainment), that aired for 11 seasons between 1994-2004 on Channel 2 commercial channel, and is one of the highest rated shows ever aired on commercial TV in Israel. After the show ended, Topaz hosted several other shows on other channels, but in May 2007 he announced that he would no longer host TV shows, but would pursue other careers such as acting and documentary film making.

== 1981 election controversy ==
In 1981, Topaz gained notoriety for comments he made during an Israeli Labor Party political rally in Tel Aviv's Malchei Yisrael Square (later renamed Rabin Square) when he said: "It's a pleasure to see the crowd here, and it's a pleasure to see that there are no chahchahim (derogatory slang word alluding to Israeli Jews of Middle Eastern background) who ruin election gatherings. The Likud's chahchahim are at Metzudat Ze'ev" (the headquarters of the rival Likud party)

These remarks were made during the 1981 Israeli legislative election campaign, which was characterized by intense ethnic tensions between Jews of Middle Eastern and North African descent (Mizrahim) and those of European descent (Ashkenazim). Topaz's comments, coming from an Ashkenazi background, were widely perceived as elitist and condescending toward the Mizrahi community. The remarks were immediately broadcast across all media outlets and were strategically utilized by Likud leaders to portray the rival Labor Party as arrogant, effectively mobilizing Mizrahi voters. The incident is widely considered to have significantly contributed to Likud's eventual electoral victory.

Likud leader Menachem Begin responded to Topaz's comments in his own election rally speech. He praised pre-state militants from Middle Eastern backgrounds, including one who played a role in the King David Hotel bombing. The most famous line: "They fastened the grenade to their hearts, and they pulled the pin. An Ashkenazi Jew? An Iraqi Jew? They were Jews! Brothers! Warriors!" referred to two of the Olei Hagardom who killed themselves in a Jerusalem prison in 1947.

== Criminal charges and suicide ==
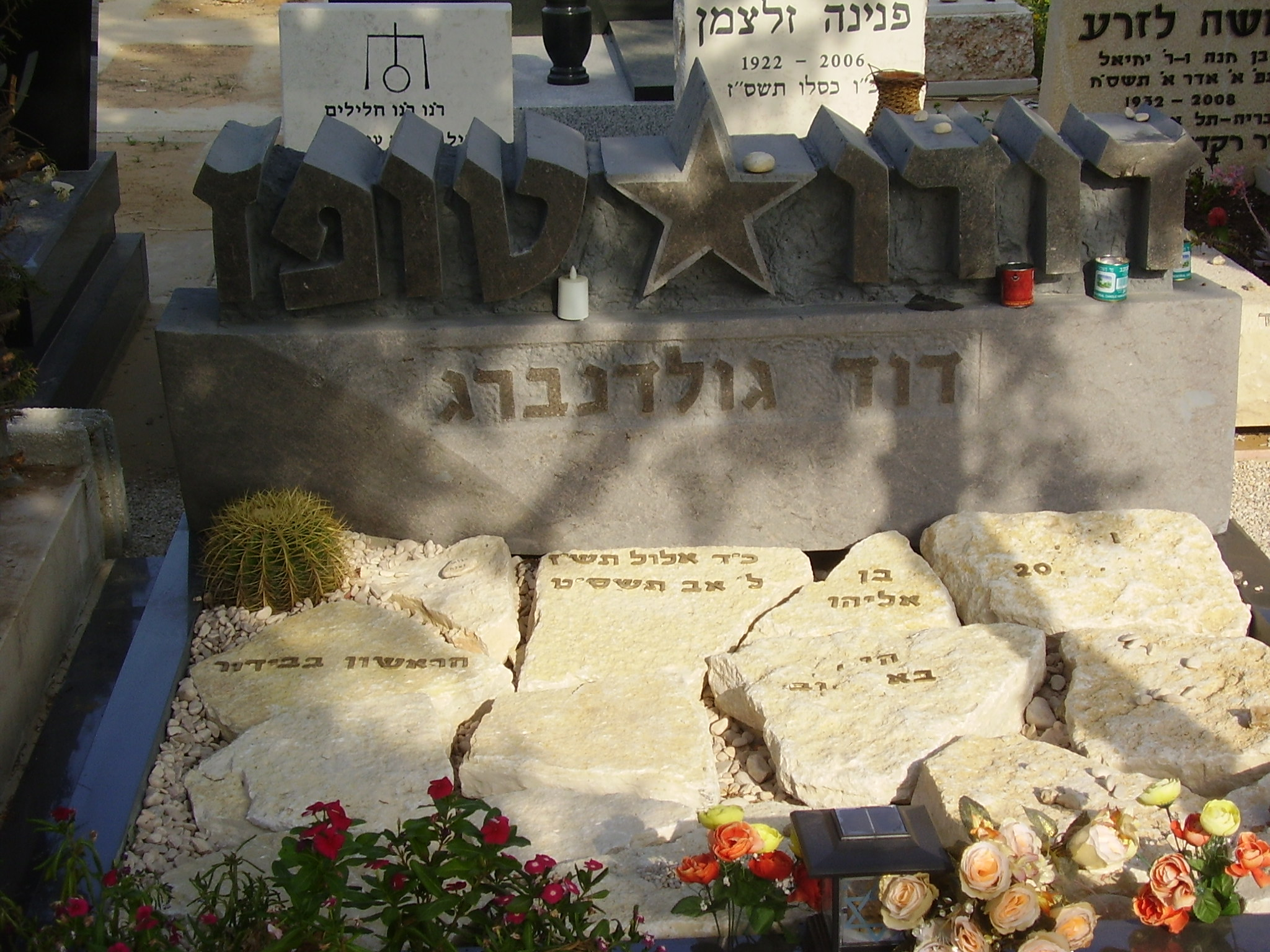
Dudu Topaz's grave, inscribed David Goldenberg, in the "Yarkon" cemetery.

In May 2009, Topaz was arrested on suspicion of ordering, organizing and paying for a series of attacks on top-level TV executives Avi Nir and Shira Margalit and showbiz agent Boaz Ben-Zion. The three were beaten by assailants and sustained serious injuries. Topaz was also accused of planning attacks against television figures Zvika Hadar, Erez Tal, and Avri Gilad, Israel Hayom editor-in-chief Amos Regev, his ex-wife Roni Chen, and her husband Haim Zenati, as well as a second assault against Ben-Zion after judging that the first had not been severe enough. Topaz allegedly went on this revenge spree because his show was taken off the air, and because he was rejected by rival channels and newspapers for which he offered to write guest columns. On June 2, 2009, it was reported that Topaz had confessed to having ordered the assaults. Topaz was later also indicted for drug possession, due to allegations that for the previous three years, Topaz had purchased cocaine from Ofir Sasportas, one of the other suspects in the case.

He attempted suicide in his prison cell at the Abu Kabir Detention Center in Tel Aviv on July 3, 2009, after taking an overdose of insulin, used to control his diabetes. He was briefly hospitalized.

A second suicide attempt on August 20, 2009, was fatal, and at approximately 7:00 AM Topaz was found by a warden hanging in a shower (the only place without video surveillance) in the Nitzan Detention Center in Ramla. He apparently used the cord of an electric kettle to hang himself. He was buried in the Yarkon Cemetery in a funeral that hundreds of people attended.

In 2012, several men who Topaz hired to carry out the assaults were convicted or reached plea bargains.

== Personal life ==
In 1988, Topaz had a brief affair with makeup artist Mati Halachmi, and they had a son named Daniel.

In 1990, Topaz married Dalia Bar Sheshet (died in March 2019) a saleswoman from Bat Yam. They had a son named Omer and divorced in 1993.

In 1997, he married Roni Chen, an English teacher. They separated after a few months but got back together. They had a son named Jonathan and divorced after his birth.
