= Keshet International =

Israeli media company

- Founded: 2012; 14 years ago
- Headquarters: London, Los Angeles, Munich, Tel Aviv
- Area served: Worldwide
- Key people: Keren Shahar (CEO)
- Website: keshetinternational.com

Keshet International is the global production and distribution arm of Israeli media company Keshet Media Group (Hebrew: שידורי קשת). Keshet International was established in 2012 and is now led by CEO Keren Shahar, who was appointed to the role at the start of 2023. The company has subsidiaries in the United States, United Kingdom, and Germany that develop and produce Keshet properties as well as original IP with local talent.

In addition to distributing Keshet Media Group properties, Keshet International sells third-party properties and develops and produces localized versions of popular television formats. Programs distributed by Keshet International include Prisoners of War, the Israeli show that Emmy Award-winning show from which Homeland was adapted; Master Class; The A Word, which was sold to BBC One; Rising Star; False Flag, which was adapted by Keshet UK as Suspicion, and When Heroes Fly which was picked up by Netflix and then adapted as Echo 3 by Keshet Studios.

Keshet International is represented by William Morris Endeavor in the United States.

== History ==
Established in 2012, Keshet International was led by television executive Alon Shtruzman for its first decade.

Keshet International began expanding internationally when it opened London-based Keshet UK in 2012, which co-produced The A Word with ITV Studios, for BBC One. In 2015, Keshet International launched Keshet Studios, a Los Angeles-based studio overseeing Keshet's U.S. activities including production, development, promotion, packaging, and sales of KI's IP and original scripted programming. In 2017, Keshet International acquired Munich-based production company, Tresor TV Produktions GmbH. In March 2018, the global producer and distributor acquired a majority stake in UK production company incubator, investor and business accelerator Greenbird Media and later that same year, Keshet International launched a scripted arm with Tresor in Germany called Keshet Tresor Fiction.

Following Keren Shahar's appointment as CEO at the start of 2023, the company launched a non-scripted division of Keshet Studios to build on its scripted success in the US. In July 2023, Keshet International sold its majority stake in Greenbird to STV Group. Soon after, Keshet International relaunched the scripted arm of Tresor as a standalone scripted production company, Keshet Germany on 1 September 2023.

== Properties ==
As a distributor, Keshet International is best known for its scripted formats such as The A Word, which is based on Keren Margalit's Yellow Peppers for Keshet 12 and has been adapted in the UK, the Netherlands and Greece to date; False Flag which Keshet UK remade for Apple TV as Suspicion with Uma Thurman; The Gordin Cell which was adapted in the United States as M.I.C.E. (later Coercion); and Prisoners of War, the Israeli show from which Emmy Award-winning show Homeland was adapted; the International Emmy Award-winning comedy Traffic Light and the Canneseries winning drama When Heroes Fly, which Keshet International sold to Netflix and Keshet Studios' adapted for Apple TV as Echo 3. The global content company has just sold Keshet 12's next hotly-anticipated thriller Trust No One to Netflix in 20 territories ahead of its premiere in Israel.

The group's reality and entertainment properties include Tuesday's Child's The Hit List for BBC One, Keshet UK's relationship format Singletown for ITV2, Help! I Can’t Cook, Girlfri3nds. and Rising Star, the first show on television to incorporate real-time voting via a fully integrated app, which after being picked up in more than 25 territories, became the fastest-selling talent format at the time.

Other talent properties commissioned by Keshet 12 in Israel and distributed by Keshet International are Master Class, a talent show for children ages 8–14.; and Masters of Dance, where four dance masters each form a new company of dancers to compete in a series of head-to-head battles. Keshet International also distributes ever-popular gameshows including BOOM! and Deal with It! which have now been sold into 20 and 22 territories respectively.

Keshet International's catalogue also includes a growing slate of English language factual and finished tape, bolstered by its 2018 acquisition of a majority stake in Greenbird Media - including award-winning documentaries like Surviving 9/11 and Ellie Simmonds: A World without Dwarfism - and its KI Content Fund, which brought high-quality dramas like BBC One's The Trial of Christine Keeler and Seven Network's Secret Bridesmaids' Business to global audiences. The global content producer and distributor co-produced Rough Diamonds, an eight-part crime drama set in the diamond dealing district of Antwerp, with Belgium's De Mensen for Netflix; and the limited drama Our Boys with HBO Studios for HBO.

=== Keshet Studios ===
With offices in Los Angeles, Keshet Studios is Keshet International's US-based production arm. Drawing on KI's catalogue, as well as its network of connections, to develop, produce, and package content for the US and international marketplaces, Keshet Studios was led by president Peter Traugott for its first decade. Most recent orders include A Small Light (Disney+), The Calling (NBC), Echo 3 (Apple TV+), three seasons of La Brea (NBC), the critically acclaimed Our Boys (HBO), the mid-season pick-ups Lincoln Rhyme: Hunt for the Bone Collector (NBC) and The Baker and The Beauty (ABC), four seasons of YA drama Dead Girls Detective Agency (Snap) and the studio's first two feature films, The Sound of Silence and Save Yourselves! - both selected for the Sundance Film Festival's US dramatic competition in 2019 and 2020 respectively. Its most recent feature Tatami (film) — the first to be co-directed by an Iranian and an Israeli filmmaker - won the Brian Award in competition at the Venice Film Festival.

Other productions since its launch include The Brave (NBC), Wisdom of the Crowd (CBS); as well as the pilots Skinny Dip (CW), Suspicion (NBC), and Salamander (ABC). Following a first-look deal and co-production pact for scripted fare with Universal Television that lasted for a decade, Keshet Studios recently announced a scripted first-look pact with Sony Pictures Television with showrunner Dana Fox attached to Keshet 12's romcom Save the Date. Keshet Studios is repped by WME.

=== Keshet UK ===
Keshet International's UK production arm, Keshet UK, is a British independent production company that develops and produces scripted drama and comedy for the UK and global TV markets. Established in 2012, recent productions of local adaptations of Keshet formats include the False Flag remakeSuspicion (Apple TV) starring Uma Thurman and Kunal Nayyar, the remake of Keren Margalit's Yellow Peppers The A Word (BBC One) and its spin-off Ralph & Katie (BBC One), alongside Loaded (Channel 4).

=== Tresor TV ===
Since its foundation in 1992, Tresor TV has been producing high-quality programmes for the German-speaking television market with a focus on reality and factual entertainment shows. With its flair for tapping into the national and global zeitgeist, Tresor TV succeeds time and time again in shaping the German television landscape. In 2017, Tresor TV became part of Keshet International. German remakes of Keshet formats include Keshet 12's Masters of Dance for ProSieben and Domination (Schlauer als Alle – Schlägst du Deutschland?) with Sonja Zietlow for RTL.

=== Keshet Germany ===
At the end of 2018, Tresor TV and KI launched the scripted division Keshet Tresor Fiction to extend Tresor's success into the fiction sector. Following a raft of successful productions, including German adaptation of the Israeli black comedy Stockholm for RTL's VOX and TVNow entitled Unter Freunden Stirbt Man Nicht (You Don’t Die Among Friends), How To Dad for ARD, and its award-winning 6-part adaptation Der Schatten for ZDFNeo, Keshet International relaunched the scripted arm as standalone scripted production company, Keshet Germany on 1 September 2023. Recent adaptations of Keshet formats include Messiah Superstar for Joyn and the romcom My Ex for ZDF Neo

=== Greenbird Media ===
Keshet International acquired a majority stake in Greenbird Media, the British production company incubator, investor and business accelerator in March 2018. In July 2023, STV Group acquired Greenbird, including Keshet's stake, for £21.4 million.

== See also ==
- Keshet Media Group
- List of programs broadcast by Keshet International
