= Chris Boal =

American dramatist

- Born: Christopher Stetson Boal; New York City, U.S.
- Occupations: Playwright, screenwriter
- Relatives: Mark Boal (half-brother)

Christopher Stetson Boal is an American playwright and screenwriter. Before he became a screenwriter, Boal worked as a playwright. He is the half-brother of screenwriter Mark Boal.

In 2006, Boal wrote Crazy for the Dog, a comedic melodrama aimed a dissecting contemporary family dynamics. The production played at Bouwerie Lane Theater. In 2009, Boal wrote 23 Knives, about the assassination of Julius Caesar, shown in repertory at the Harold Clurman Theater, off-Broadway.

In 2010, Boal wrote Order, directed by actor, director and playwright Austin Pendleton, which was shown at the Kirk Theater at Theatre Row (New York City). Boal wrote Pimm's Mission, playing July - August 2015 at 59E59 Theaters .

Boal created The Continuing Adventures of Dick Danger, as well as Bad Guys Don't Know Dick - the Musical, and the award-winning short film Walking Charlie. A Hope for this World won an audience award at the Edinburgh Festival Fringe.

Boal was charged with writing a reboot of Zorro for Sony Pictures.
