= Jewish Journal (disambiguation) =

The Jewish Journal is a weekly newspaper in Los Angeles.

The Jewish Journal may also refer to:

- The Jewish Journal (Boston North), newspaper serving the Jewish community of Essex County, Massachusetts north of Boston
- Jewish Morning Journal, a Yiddish-language publication in New York from 1901 to 1971
- San Diego Jewish Journal

== See also ==
- List of Jewish newspapers
