= Peter Traugott =

American television producer (born 1970)

- Born: Peter Scott Traugott; November 16, 1970 (age 54); Los Altos, California, U.S.
- Occupation: Television producer
- Spouse: Mandana Dayani
- Children: 2

Peter Scott Traugott (born November 16, 1970) is an American television producer who is currently the president of Keshet Studios.

== Career ==
Born in Los Altos, California, Traugott majored in business at UC Berkeley in California. He then worked as an investment banker before attending Harvard Business School. After attending business school, he landed a creative executive job at Fox Studios. He then joined Brillstein-Grey Entertainment as a vice president of television and was promoted to president when Brad Grey left to run Paramount in 2005.

Prior to serving as president of Keshet Studios, Traugott founded TBD Entertainment at NBC. He has executive produced Lincoln Rhyme: The Hunt for the Bone Collector (NBC), La Brea, Homeland, Echo 3, A Small Light, The Baker and the Beauty (ABC), The Calling, and the critically acclaimed Our Boys (HBO). Traugott has also developed numerous television pilots including for Real Time with Bill Maher, According to Jim, and The Showbiz Show with David Spade. He served as executive producer of Samantha Who? starring Christina Applegate and for the Sarah Michelle Gellar series Ringer. Traugott also executive produced Gellar's unsold HBO pilot The Wonderful Maladys.

He is married to Mandana Dayani, attorney, media executive, and founder of I am a voter, with whom he shares two daughters.
