= Avi Nir =

Israeli television executive and producer (born 1961)

- אבי ניר
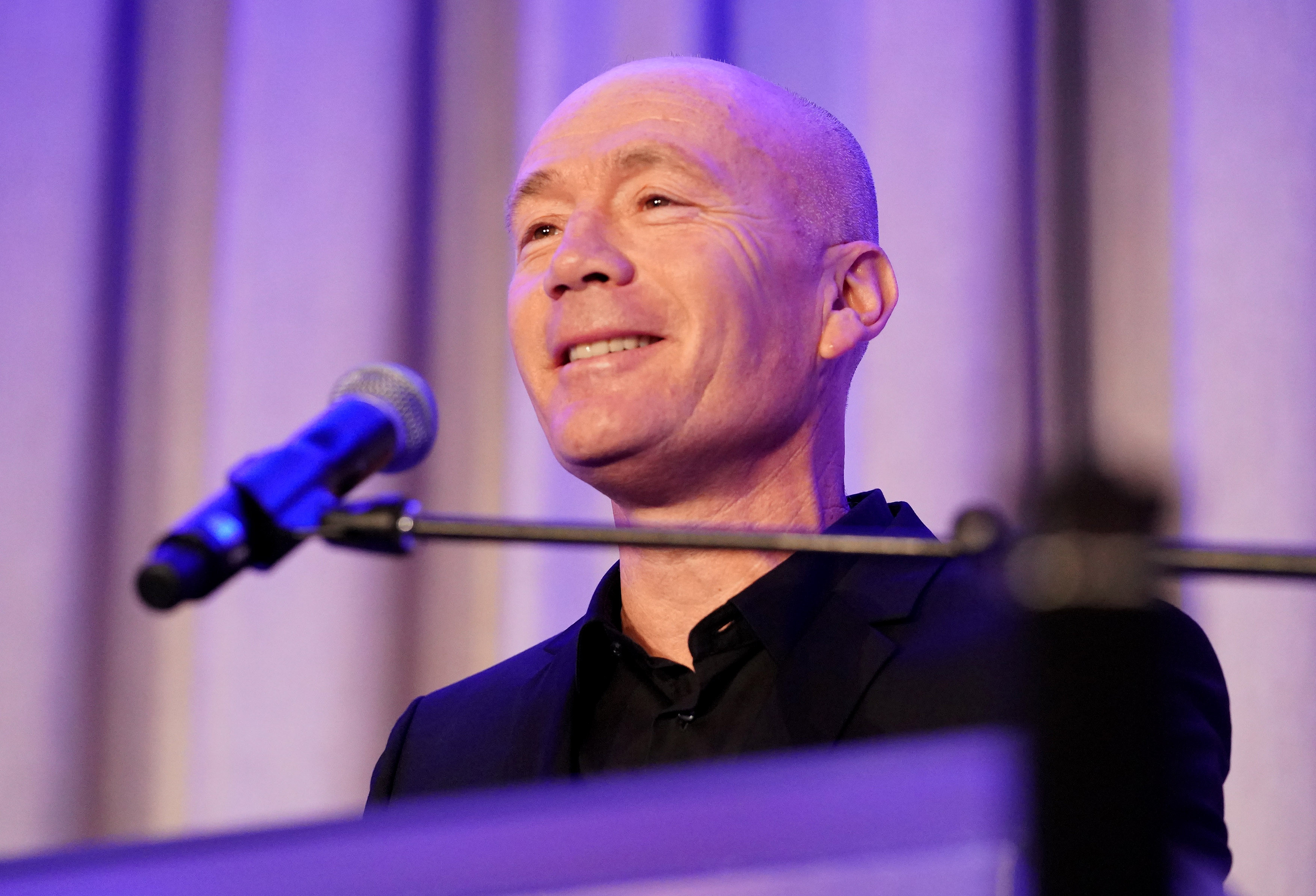
- Born: 1961 (age 64–65); Jerusalem, Israel
- Occupations: CEO of Keshet Media Group, television broadcaster and producer
- Years active: 2002–present
- Spouse: Tami Nir-Gottlieb

Avi Nir (Hebrew: אבי ניר; born 1961) is an Israeli television executive, entrepreneur, writer and producer. He is the CEO of the Israeli media group Keshet Broadcasting serving as a leading content and programming director. He is known as the Executive producer of the American television program Homeland for which he won three Emmy Awards. (Note: Outstanding Drama Series, 2012, 2015 & 2016.)

== Biography ==
Avi Nir was born in Jerusalem, to a Jewish family. He holds a BA from the department of Film and Television at the Tel Aviv University. He also attended the Tel Aviv University Graduate School of Business where he received his MA and MBA. He published various academic articles and received the Sigal Prize for excellence in marketing research. He also studied for one semester at the New York University Tisch School of the Arts. During his psychology, marketing and television studies he taught in the university's Faculty of Management and its Department of Film and Television. In 1993, he co-authored Advertising in Television: The Media, the Message, the Money with Ayalah Rahav.

Nir is married to Tami Nir-Gottlieb, a clinical psychologist, and has two daughters.

== Media career ==
Nir joined Keshet in 1993. In 1994, Nir was appointed as Vice President of Marketing for Keshet. In 1998 he also became responsible for content. He served as VP of Marketing through 1999 before heading Keshet's core business as VP of Programming. He became CEO of Keshet Media Group in 2002.

As CEO of Keshet, Nir expanded the company beyond producing for the Israeli market by selling, co-developing and co-producing shows for the international market. Keshet International, the global distribution and production arm of Keshet has since expanded to include production outposts in the UK, Germany, Hong Kong and in the US. Keshet has become an overachiever in the US, with Keshet Studios currently working with NBC, ABC, HBO, Apple, Netflix and others. Its first feature film, The Sound of Silence, was picked up by Sony Pictures Worldwide Acquisitions ahead of its premiere at the 2019 Sundance Film Festival. Keshet Studios' second feature, Save Yourselves!, received its world premiere as part of 2020 Sundance Film Festival's US dramatic competition.

Since Keshet's international expansion, the company has produced multiple international commercially successful programs. One such show is the Showtime series Homeland which is based on the Israeli program Hatufim. Nir attributes the success of adapting Keshet programs for foreign audiences on the discerning nature of the preliminary Israeli audiences, the strength of the writers, the "spirit of innovation" at Keshet and a constant need to improve upon shows. The success of Homeland at the behest of Nir is credited as the catalyst for the annual doubling of foreign deals done by Keshet.

He produced talent program Rising Star which is the first show on television to incorporate real-time voting via a fully integrated app. After its debut in October 2013, Rising Star was picked up in more than 25 territories, which made it the fastest-selling talent format at the time. Nir is credited as an executive producer on American TV shows Tyrant, Your Family Or Mine, Deal With It and Allegiance which is based on the Keshet program The Gordin Cell, aka MICE.

In 2014, Nir came up with the idea of producing the archaeological thriller series Dig in Israel. His inspiration for the series was a visit to new archaeological sites at the City of David in Jerusalem. In 2015, HBO announced that Ari Shavit's My Promised Land: The Triumph and Tragedy of Israel would be made into a documentary film with Nir as executive producer. Nir has executively produced over 30 shows in the last 20 years, including the critically acclaimed mini-series Our Boys, co-produced by Keshet Studios and HBO.

Nir oversaw and implemented Keshet's launch of Israeli popular music channel Music 24. In 2007, Nir established Keshet's digital arm and web portal mako, which is the third most-trafficked site in Israel. Nir is also the co-host of the Innovation in Television (INTV) confab, along with Keshet Media Group, which has been hosted in Jerusalem since 2012. The two-day conference features panels with industry executives, lectures, and mixers.

== Dudu Topaz attack ==
In 2008 two men attacked Nir near his home in Tel Aviv. He received treatment for injuries at Ichilov Hospital. In 2009, Israeli entertainer Dudu Topaz was charged for his involvement in the attack on Nir along with assaults on other people in the Israeli entertainment industry.

== Awards and recognition ==
Nir was nominated for an Emmy Award in 2013 as Executive Producer of Homeland. He personally won an Emmy when the show received recognition for Outstanding Drama Series in 2012.

In conjunction with Keshet and Jerusalem Mayor Nir Barkat, Nir initiated the inaugural INTV conference in 2012. INTV was the first international television conference ever held in Israel with a second held in November 2013 and another scheduled for March 2015. He delivered the keynote address at the 2014 MIPTV Focus on Israel conference in Cannes, France.

Nir won the title "Marketing Personality of the Year" from the Israeli Marketing Union in 2008. In 2009 he was awarded the title "TV Personality of the Decade" at the Rosh Pina Festival and by Israeli web portal Walla!. In 2011 he was named the third most influential person in the media by Israel's largest business magazine Globes and in 2012 The Marker ranked him as No. 28 in their list of "Israel's 100 most influential people this Jewish year."

In 2013, Israeli newspaper Haaretz named Nir the No. 1 Most Influential Person in Israeli culture among a list of the nation's 100 Most Influential People. He was also named "Executive of the Year" and "Television Personality of the Decade" Israeli business magazines TheMarker and Globes, respectively. Nir was awarded TBI's inaugural Contribution to Content Award in 2018, and also made the Variety500, Variety's index of the 500 most influential business leaders shaping the global $2 trillion entertainment industry every year since its inception in 2017.

== See also ==
- Israeli television
