= John Burroughs High School =

Coordinates: 34.169944°N 118.327684°W

- 1920 West Clark Avenue; Burbank, California 91506; United States

Information
- Type: Public
- Established: 1948
- School district: Burbank Unified School District
- Staff: 93.07 (on an FTE basis)
- Grades: 9-12
- Enrollment: 2,283 (2024–2025)
- Student to teacher ratio: 24.53
- Colors: Red and white
- Athletics conference: CIF Southern Section Pacific League
- Mascot: Bears
- Website: jbhs.burbankusd.org

John Burroughs High School is a public high school located in Burbank, in Los Angeles County, California. It is known for its notable alumni, and being the filming location for many television shows.

== History ==
The building was built in the 1920s but was not established as a high school until 1948. The school is named after the American naturalist John Burroughs.

John Burroughs High School is ranked 389th in California. The student body is 66% minority, and 26% of students are considered economically disadvantaged. It is one of 3 high schools within the Burbank Unified School District.

On June 7, 1963 then President John F. Kennedy visited the Burrough's Senior Prom at The Beverly Hills Hotel in Beverly Hills, California. He was in town for a fundraising dinner in preparation for the 1964 election. The following year, Burbank's Rose Parade float was themed around this event.

== Academics ==
The school scored a 769 on the Academic Performance Index in 2007, and in 2010 reached a score of 819, meeting the school's 12th consecutive goal. 90% of students passed the math portion of the CAHSEE (California High School Exit Exams) on the first attempt, while 92% of students passed the English portion of the CAHSEE on first attempt.

== Athletics ==
The track and field team produced Olympic silver medalist Ron Morris (Rome, 1960).

In 2016, the boys' varsity water polo team won the school's second CIF championship.

== Performing arts ==
=== Choirs ===
The school has seven award-winning choirs including Chamber, the advanced mixed show choir, also known as Powerhouse when competing; Madrigals, the advanced women's choir, also known as Sound Sensations when competing; Sound Waves, the intermediate mixed choir; Decibelles, the intermediate women's choir; Men @ Work, the men's choir; Neochromatics, selected members from Chamber in an a cappella ensemble; Muses, selected members from Madrigals in an a cappella ensemble.

The school's advanced mixed show choir, Powerhouse, has won awards including the Grand Championship at Fame Orlando 2007, Grand Champions at Fame Chicago 2008, Grand Champions at Fame New York 2009, Grand Champions at Fame New York 2012, and Grand Champions of FAME Hollywood 2013. The two advanced show choirs of John Burroughs High School, "Powerhouse" and "Sound Sensations" also won Grand Championship at Fame Chicago 2013. They were also awarded Grand Champions of New England Show Choir Showdown in 2015. With the grand championship, Powerhouse also received caption awards for Best Choreography, Best Costumes, Best Diction, Best Female Sound, Best Tech Crew, and Best Male Soloist. Sound Sensations received the award for Best Vocals of the Women's Division. Several ensembles within the vocal music program have recorded undefeated competition seasons. The advanced mixed show choir, Powerhouse, achieved this in 2017, 2022, and 2026, while the advanced treble show choir, Sound Sensations, maintained undefeated records in 2010, 2013, 2015, 2025, and 2026. Among the intermediate groups, the intermediate mixed show choir, Sound Waves, completed undefeated runs in 2012, 2017, and 2025, and the intermediate treble show choir, Decibelles, went undefeated in 2005 and 2026. The men's show choir, Men @ Work, also secured undefeated seasons in 2006, 2018, 2019, 2023, 2024, and 2026. In 2010 Powerhouse performed on The Oprah Winfrey Show. Also in the fall of 2010, the Powerhouse Choir performed on Dancing With The Stars. Powerhouse has performed twice on The Voice. And, in February 2011, Powerhouse Choir performed for the Chinese New Year Night Parade at Hong Kong, representing the U.S.

=== Band ===
There are four bands: Concert Band, Symphonic Orchestra, Wind Ensemble and Jazz Ensemble (A Band and B Band) as well as a Drumline and Color Guard at Burroughs. In 2006, the marching band played "All Star" for the soundtrack of Shrek the Third. In 2010, they performed the piece "Stars and Tights" for the movie "Megamind". They were selected to play at the 2011 Sugar Bowl half-time show in New Orleans, Louisiana. Soon afterwards, they were invited to be featured on Ellen for her 2011 Super Bowl Special.

The JBHS marching band was featured in the 1994 movie Little Giants, which included sound from the percussion line just prior to the big game.

The JBHS Marching band was featured in a comedy skit for the 70's NBC television show "Laugh-In" which aired on Nov. 8, 1971.

== District ==
John Burroughs High School is a member of the Burbank Unified School District (BUSD).

== Notable alumni ==
Many actors and actresses have attended the school due to its proximity to major entertainment studios such as NBCUniversal, Warner Bros. and Walt Disney Studios, as well as voice recording and animation studios including Nickelodeon and Cartoon Network.

- Wayne Allwine, actor, official voice actor of Mickey Mouse from 1977 to 2009
- Charlotte Austin, actress
- Eric Balfour, actor
- Patrick Bristow, actor, Ellen, Showgirls
- Eben Britton, former NFL player
- Debbe Dunning, actress and model, Home Improvement
- Joan Freeman, actress and director, Roustabout, The Reluctant Astronaut, Friday the 13th: The Final Chapter
- Dave Goelz, Muppet performer
- Dan Haggerty, actor, The Life and Times of Grizzly Adams
- Elden Henson, actor
- Clint Howard, actor, Gentle Ben TV series and many films
- Ron Howard, actor, The Andy Griffith Show, Happy Days, and Academy Award-winning director
- Erik Kramer, former NFL quarterback and sports commentator
- Jonna Lee, actress, Making the Grade, Another World
- Mike Magnante, former professional baseball player
- Guy Mariano, professional skateboarder
- Tim Matheson, actor, National Lampoon's Animal House, The West Wing, Van Wilder
- Lindsey McKeon, actor, One Tree Hill; briefly attended but did not graduate
- Heather Menzies, actress, The Sound of Music, Logan's Run
- Brittany Murphy, actress
- Debbie Reynolds, Oscar-nominated actress, singer and entertainer, Singin' in the Rain; attended when the school was a junior high school Graduated from Burbank High School.
- Rene Russo, actress, Lethal Weapon 3, Tin Cup, Get Shorty, The Thomas Crown Affair, Thor
- Lynn Shackelford, UCLA basketball player and sports commentator for Los Angeles Lakers
- Ron Stillwell, professional baseball player
- Veronica St. Clair, actress La Brea
- Angela Watson, actress, Step by Step
- Weston "Westballz" Dennis, (class of 2009, dropped out) professional Super Smash Bros. Melee player
- Rob Zabrecky, magician, musician, actor, and author
