= Katherine Morse =

American computer scientist

Katherine Lee Morse is an American computer scientist whose work has centered on distributed simulation, on the integration of heterogenous simulation environments, and on standardization of methods for interoperability in simulation, including participating in the development of the High Level Architecture for modeling and simulation. She is a senior software architect at Georgia Tech Research Institute.

== Education and career ==
Morse began working as a computer programmer as a high school graduate. She went to the University of Arizona, where she earned bachelor's degrees in both mathematics and Russian, and a master's degree in computer science, in 1982, 1983, and 1986, respectively. She continued her education at the University of California, Irvine, earning a second master's degree and a Ph.D. in information and computer science Her 2000 doctoral dissertation, An Adaptive, Distributed Algorithm for Interest Management, was jointly supervised by Lubomir Bic and Michael Dillencourt, and included some of her work on data distribution in the High Level Architecture.

Morse worked for Science Applications International Corporation (SAIC), where she was a technical fellow, chief federation engineer, and assistant vice president of technology. She moved to the Johns Hopkins Applied Physics Laboratory in 2008, and Georgia Tech Research Institute in 2025.

== Standardization efforts ==
Morse was a leader in the IEEE 1516 Standards Development Group, which produced the High Level Architecture, and in the Simulation Interoperability Standards Committee (later part of the Simulation Interoperability Standards Organization, SISO), beginning in the late 1990s. She chaired the Standards Activity Committee of the SISO beginning in 2007, and was technical lead for the Federation Engineering Agreements Template of the SISO. She has also been one of the leaders in the IEEE 1730 committee for standardization of the Distributed Simulation Engineering and Execution Process, and with the NATO MSG-136 Allied Framework for Modeling and Simulation as a Service.

== Recognition ==
Morse won the 2007 Hans Karlsson Standards Award of the IEEE Computer Society "for leadership in development of modeling and simulation standards and exemplary collaboration in establishing the Simulation Interoperability Standards Organization (SISO) Standards Activity Committee (SAC) as an IEEE standards sponsor". As part of NATO M&S Group 136, she won the Scientific Achievement Award of the NATO Science and Technology Organization in 2019. The Simulation Interoperability Standards Organization gave her their Meritorious Service Award in 2020.

She was named an IEEE Fellow, in the 2021 class of fellows, "for contributions to standardization of simulation technologies".

== Other works ==
Morse writes The Adventures of Drake & McTrowell, a steampunk adventure series, with her husband, David L. Drake. They have written four novels in the series and present interactive literary experiences at conventions. They contribute to anthologies and multi-author novels, some of which Morse edits and for which Drake does cover design and art. Harry Turtledove is a co-author of two of them. They have also appeared in two episodes of the steampunk web series League of STEAM. Their radio show version of their first novel, “London, Where It All Began,” has run multiple times on Krypton Radio, now SCIFI.radio.

Morse writes a cooking blog of her personally-developed recipes, the title of which derives from a character in Drake & McTrowell.
