= S.W.A.T. Exiles =

2026 American action crime drama television series

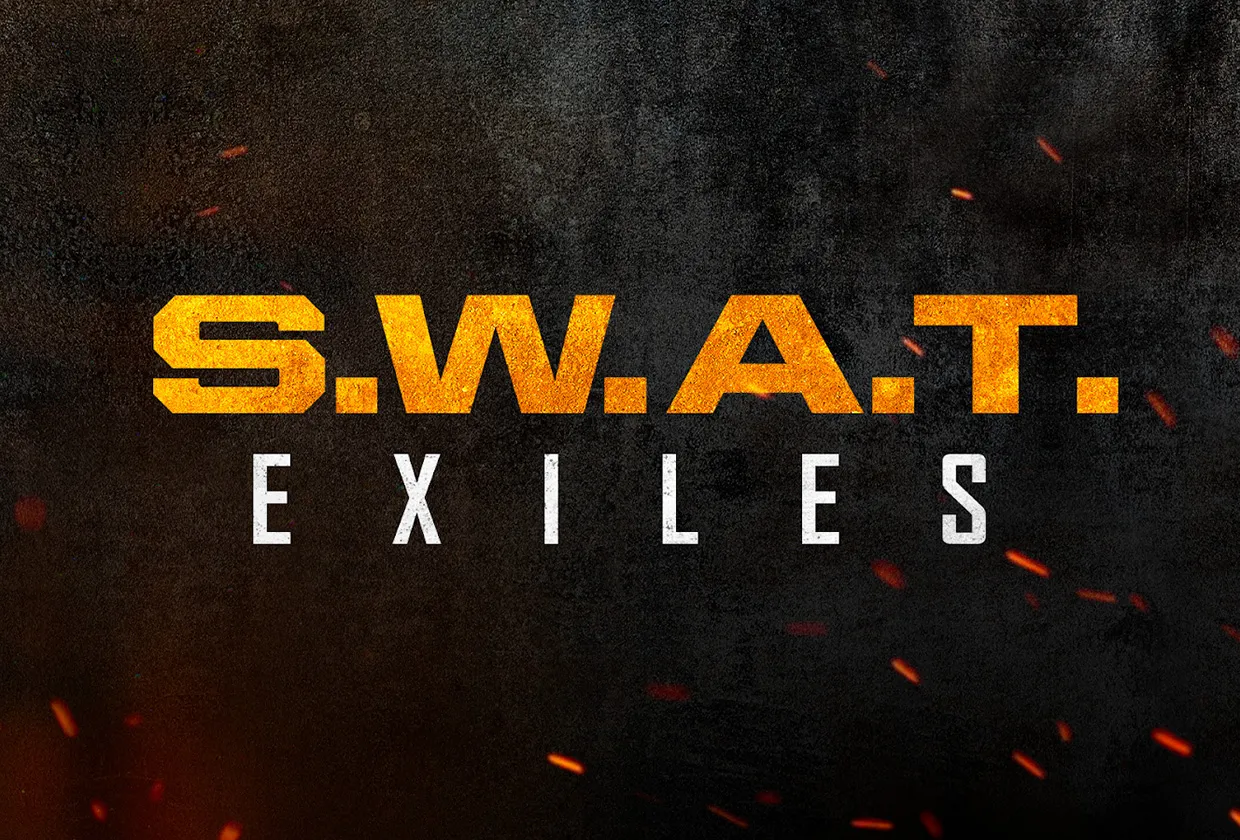
- Genre: Action thriller; Crime drama; Police procedural; Romance
- Based on: Characters by Robert Hamner
- Developed by: Jason Ning
- Starring: Shemar Moore; Ronen Rubinstein; Freddy Miyares; Lucy Barrett; Zyra Gorecki; Adain Bradley
- Composer: Marcelo Zarvos
- Country of origin: United States
- Original language: English
- No. of seasons: 1
- No. of episodes: 10

Production
- Executive producers: Jason Ning; Neal H. Moritz; Pavun Shetty; James Scura; Jon Cowan; Kevin Tancharoen; Shemar Moore
- Producers: Jonathan C. Brody; Brian Scott George
- Editor: Mark Pattavina
- Camera setup: Single-camera
- Production companies: Original Film; Ning; Sony Pictures Television

Original release
- Network: Starz
- Release: September 25, 2026 – present

Related
- S.W.A.T. (2017 TV series)

S.W.A.T. Exiles is an American action drama series, that serves as a sequel/spin-off of the 2017 television series S.W.A.T.. Jason Ning serves as the series' showrunner, with Neal H. Moritz and Pavun Shetty of Original Film, Shemar Moore, Ning, and past S.W.A.T. executive James Scura executive producing.

In May 2025, after the cancellation of the original series, it was reported that Sony Pictures Television would be producing a spin-off of the series, to be titled S.W.A.T. Exiles, with Shemar Moore set to reprise his role of Daniel "Hondo" Harrelson and production to commence in mid-2025 in Los Angeles with the entire crew of the original series. Sony Pictures Television ordered ten episodes, yet did not initially sign any domestic or international partners for distribution. Filming for the series commenced in September 2025 in California.

S.W.A.T. Exiles premiered on Starz on September 25, 2026. In August 2026, the series was renewed for a second season.

== Premise ==
"After a high-profile mission goes sideways, Daniel 'Hondo' Harrelson is pulled out of forced retirement to lead a last-chance experimental S.W.A.T. unit made up of untested, unpredictable young recruits. Hondo must bridge a generational divide, navigate clashing personalities, and turn a squad of outsiders into a team capable of protecting the city and saving the program that made him who he is."

== Cast and characters ==
=== Main ===
- Shemar Moore as Sergeant II Daniel "Hondo" Harrelson Jr., a Los Angeles native and former LAPD SWAT Team leader who returns from retirement after a mission goes sideways to lead a team of younger recruits with one last chance in a "culture generation clash of Gen X versus Gen Z."
- Ronen Rubinstein as Jude Callan
- Freddy Miyares as Ethan Cole
- Zyra Gorecki as Cassidy Reed
- Lucy Barrett as Samantha Bishop
- Adain Bradley as Malik Anderson

=== Recurring ===
- Caitlin McGee as Miranda Seitzmeier, chief of staff for the mayor
- Lenora Crichlow as Commander Angela Pike, S.W.A.T's new commander

=== Guest ===
- Jay Harrington as Sergeant David "Deacon" Kay
- Patrick St. Esprit as LAPD Commander Robert Hicks
- David Lim as Former LAPD Vice Squad Officer III Victor Tan
- Jerry O'Connell as Jerry Voss, Mayor of Los Angles

== Episodes ==
No.	Title	Directed by	Written by	Original release date
1	"Clean Entry"	Kevin Tancharoen	Jason Ning	September 25, 2026
After two years away from SWAT, SGT. Daniel "Hondo" Harrelson is called back by Commander Hicks to run a new squad of SWAT trainees. When he returns, he finds his squad consists of political landmines: an influencer, a former undercover operative, a quadriplegic, a technician known for outside the box thinking, and a former marine. As Hondo trains his team, he's haunted by the mission that ended his initial tender as a SWAT leader.
2	"Take the Shot"	Tara Nicole Weyr	Jon Cowan	October 2, 2026
After a gang rival is assassinated, 44- Squad is called to investigate a weapons deal. As Hondo continues to train and bond with his team, he holds try outs for a new scout. After a near friendly fire incident, the next person up is Bishop. However when an opp goes sideways, she freezes. When the team finds the real suspect, Hondo places Malik in charge. The opp is a success and Malik is the new scout. After shift, 44- Squad meets Ethan's loft. There, it is revealed that Callan has stolen their personnel files. Meanwhile, Hondo's suspicions about Commander Pike spark his own investigation.
3	"Burn Zone"	Oz Scott	Alexandra McNally	October 9, 2026
44- Squad is called in to stop a shooter. During the course of the investigation, the team discovers a conspiracy between an insurance company and the Department of water and power to cover up faulty generators and refuse insurance payouts. Hondo's investigation in Commander Pike leads to a meeting of the minds. After arrests are made, Pike questions Hondo over missteps in the after action report from their last mission.
4	"Get Clear"	Lisa Demaine	Jacob Copithorne	October 16, 2026
5	"Molotov Cocktail Attire"	Billy Gierhart	Jen Graham Imada & Cindy Chu	October 23, 2026
6	"Hate Crime"	Curtis Jackson	Kendall Lampkin	October 30, 2026
7	"The Project"	Daniel Ezra	Jon Cowan	November 6, 2026
8	"Edgemont"	Jay Harrington	Alexandra McNally	November 13, 2026
9	"The Vault"	Denzell Dandridge	Jen Graham Imada	November 20, 2026
10	"Hard Exit"	Lucy Barrett	Jason Ning	November 27, 2026

== Production ==
=== Development ===
Following a string of early renewals, S.W.A.T. was canceled in May 2023 after six seasons, only for parent network CBS to reverse the decision days later with a pickup of what was announced at the time as a seventh and final season. In May 2024, S.W.A.T. was renewed for an eighth season. Former executive producer Shawn Ryan first had the idea for a spin-off series amidst the renewal-and-cancellation turmoil as a backup plan, but would not be participating in the new project due to an overall development deal with streaming service Netflix. On March 6, 2025, it was announced that S.W.A.T. would be cancelled for a third and final time, with CBS opting to not even consider entering preliminary renewal discussions. Described as "Same quarterback, new team", the new show was announced less than two days later. Original network CBS was not informed of the announcement ahead of time, and Moore called his old castmates with the news before the announcement was released.

According to studio sources in a Deadline article, Sony TV opted to circumvent a typical development structure for the show and instead fast track it to series because of the short window it had to keep Moore, the S.W.A.T. soundstages, and more than 200 crew members. It also wanted to put the project in front of international buyers at the May 2025 LA Screenings. Both fans and the original cast of the show found the news to be bittersweet, as popular co-starring character Sergeant II David "Deacon" Kay (played by Jay Harrington), among others, had not been asked back.

In an interview with TVLine, Harrington stated, "It was the day before. [Moore] reached out to all of us to say, 'This is what's going on...,' and, you know, there's talk that they'll reach out to us about stuff. He wanted to be the one to tell us, and say 'your reps will find out shortly.' That's when I told my reps, and they had no idea." He recalled Moore texting him, "'I'm around if you want to give me a call.' So I texted him later and said, 'I'm sure you did your best.' We've been brothers for years, so that doesn't change." Harrington and co-star Annie Ilonzeh (who portrayed character Devin Gamble) have since expressed an interest in directing an episode or appearing in the new show in some capacity. Eight-season S.W.A.T. co-star Officer III Victor Tan (played by David Lim) called S.W.A.T. "one of the greatest honors of [his] life", but also felt "stung" by the rollout of the new show, stating in an Instagram post he felt "brushed aside when there could've been a moment of reflection and recognition — for the people who built this show, and for the impact it had on so many."

On August 11, 2026, S.W.A.T. Exiles was renewed for a second season.

=== Casting ===
On September 8, 2025, it was announced that Harrington and Patrick St. Esprit would reprise their roles as Sergeant David Kay and Commander Robert Hicks, respectively, in a guest role capacity in the pilot episode. On September 9, 2025, TVLine announced Ronen Rubinstein, Freddy Miyares, Lucy Barrett, Zyra Gorecki, and Adain Bradley would join the series as regulars alongside Moore. In October 2025, Sony Pictures Television released an on-set photo of Moore with the rest of the main cast to Variety, alongside an announcement that Kevin Tancharoen would direct the pilot episode. On February 10, 2026, TVLine announced that Lim would reprise his role as Officer Victor Tan for a Season 1 guest appearance.

=== Filming ===
Filming commenced in September 2025 in California, following announcements that the show qualified for California's Film and TV Tax Credit Program. On February 10, 2026, Deadline announced shooting of the first season had concluded, with several international screenings for potential streaming and cable platform buyers to follow.

== Release ==
S.W.A.T. Exiles premiered on Starz on September 25, 2026.

The show will air on Bell Media in English Canada and Quebecor Content in French Canada, Sky GSA (Germany, Switzerland, Austria), Sky New Zealand, Stan in Australia, Rai and Sky Italia in Italy, DPG in Flemish Belgium, and Tet in the Baltics. The series will also air on Disney+ across Latin America, WOWOW in Japan, LG Uplus in South Korea, AXN in Spain, Portugal, Hong Kong, Taiwan and across Southeast Asia, and beIN across the Middle East, North Africa and Türkiye. Finally, Sony Pictures Television also struck a deal with Canal+, which will air the series across the Netherlands, Central and Eastern Europe, Poland, French-speaking African territories, and Sub-Saharan Africa via M-Net.
