= La Brea (TV series) =

American science fiction drama television series

- Genre: Science fiction; Drama
- Created by: David Appelbaum
- Starring: Natalie Zea; Eoin Macken; Chiké Okonkwo; Karina Logue; Zyra Gorecki; Jack Martin; Veronica St. Clair; Rohan Mirchandaney; Lily Santiago; Chloe De Los Santos; Jon Seda; Josh McKenzie; Mark Lee; Nicholas Gonzalez; Tonantzin Carmelo; Michelle Vergara Moore
- Music by: James S. Levine
- Country of origin: United States
- Original language: English
- No. of seasons: 3
- No. of episodes: 30

Production
- Executive producers: Ken Woodruff; Arika Lisanne Mittman; Thor Freudenthal; Adam Davidson; Avi Nir; Alon Shtruzman; Peter Traugott; Rachel Kaplan; Steven Lilien & Bryan Wynbrandt; David Appelbaum; Christopher Hollier
- Producers: Asher Landay; Livia Hanich; Naomi Cleaver; Zakiyyah Alexander; John Mabry; Stu Wood; Jessica Granger; Andre Edmonds; Jeff Rafner; Sam Thompson
- Production locations: Melbourne, Victoria, Australia
- Cinematography: Mark Wareham; Damian Wyvill; Dan Maxwell
- Editors: Harry B. Miller III; Angie Higgins; Leland Sexton; Julie-Anne De Ruvo; Dave Redman; Michael Melis; Ben Joss; Peter Carrodus; Katrina Barker; Cory Augustyn
- Running time: 43 minutes
- Production companies: Matchbox Pictures; Keshet Studios; Bad Apple; Universal Television

Original release
- Network: NBC
- Release: September 28, 2021 – February 13, 2024

La Brea is an American science fiction drama television series that aired on NBC from September 28, 2021 until February 13, 2024, across 3 seasons and 30 episodes. It was produced by Keshet Studios and Universal Television and created and executive produced by David Appelbaum. The series received mixed-to-negative reviews from critics.

== Synopsis ==
On September 26, 2021, a massive sinkhole opens in the middle of Los Angeles at the site of the La Brea Tar Pits and Wilshire Boulevard, pulling many people, vehicles and buildings, including the Petersen Automotive Museum, into its depths. The survivors find themselves trapped in a mysterious and dangerous primeval land where they must band together to survive. The show follows the Harris family, consisting of Eve, Gavin, Izzy, and Josh, after they are separated and attempt to reunite, with Gavin having visions of when and where Eve and Josh are. The sinkhole and the sudden appearance of Teratornis attract the attention of the United States Department of Homeland Security, who are investigating a similar event in the Mojave Desert. As the series progresses, the investigators realize that the sinkholes are a spacetime portal to the same location in 10,000 BC. Meanwhile, the survivors search for a way back through the portal before it closes. Revealed by one of the scientists who created the sinkholes, the survivors must also see to it that a child from a village in 10,000 BC needs to go through a different portal to get to 1988 or one of the survivors would cease to exist as well as his children.

Season two reveals that the sinkholes were caused by the Lazarus Project, led by Gavin's long-lost father James Mallet and run by people from 2076, who are researching ways to deal with their time's depleted resources and how to master de-extinction.

The third and final season deals with the aftermath of a time portal's destruction, which brings different things from across time, such as dinosaurs. In addition, Gavin and his allies must contend with the Reisander Group, which plans to weaponize time travel.

== Cast and characters ==
=== Main ===
- Natalie Zea as Eve Harris (seasons 1–2; special guest star in season 3 (Note: Credited as "Special Guest Star" in the end credits of "The Road Home" Pt. 2.)), Izzy and Josh's helicopter mother who works as an office manager
- Eoin Macken as Gavin Harris, Eve's estranged husband and a former military pilot who has visions of 10,000 BC
  - Diesel La Torraca as Isaiah, a young boy in the past who grows up to become Gavin after being sent through time
- Chiké Okonkwo as Ty Coleman, a therapist with a medical condition whom Eve befriends
- Karina Logue as Marybeth Hill (season 1), a police officer from Baton Rouge, Louisiana, who headed to Los Angeles while on the trail of her estranged son Lucas. She later dies after one of Silas' followers fatally injures her.
- Zyra Gorecki as Izzy Harris, Eve and Gavin's teenage daughter who lost her left leg (below the knee) in a car crash
- Jack Martin as Josh Harris, (Note: Credited as Starring in season 3 episode 1, "Sierra" and Special Guest Star in season 3 episode 6, "The Road Home Part 2".) Eve and Gavin's teenage son
- Veronica St. Clair as Riley Velez, (Note: Credited as Starring in season 3 episode 1, "Sierra" and Special Guest Star in season 3 episode 6, "The Road Home Part 2".) Dr. Sam Velez's daughter whom Josh befriends
- Rohan Mirchandaney as Scott Israni, an anthropology graduate student from Australia who worked at the George C. Page Museum. He is a recreational drug user who uses marijuana to ease his anxiety.
- Lily Santiago as Veronica Castillo, a former runaway whose supposed father, Aaron, died after a dire wolf mauled him. It is later revealed that he kidnapped her when she was a child.
- Chloe De Los Santos as Lilly Castillo (season 1), a girl who pretends she cannot speak and passes herself off as Veronica's sister. In reality, Veronica and Aaron kidnapped her.
  - Michelle Vergara Moore as Ella Jones (season 2; recurring season 1), a grown up version of Lilly that followed Isaiah to the present and has grown up to become an artist. She later sacrifices herself to let Veronica have an Epipen after yellowjackets sting them.
- Jon Seda as Dr. Sam Velez, Riley's father, who works as a physician and is a former Navy SEAL.
- Josh McKenzie as Lucas Hayes, Marybeth's son who works as a heroin dealer. He has been estranged from her since she shot his father after he planned to turn Lucas in to the police to save himself.
- Nicholas Gonzalez as Levi Delgado, (Note: Credited as Starring in season 3 episode 1, "Sierra" and Special Guest Star in season 3 episode 5, "The Road Home Part 1".) a United States Air Force pilot and an old friend of the Harris family who is Gavin's rival for Eve's affection. He later dies saving Gavin from the Reisander Group's soldiers.
- Tonantzin Carmelo as Paara (season 2; recurring season 1, guest star season 3), a Tongva Native American who speaks modern English. She lives in the Fort and marries Ty in season two.

=== Recurring ===
- Ione Skye as Jessica Harris (season 1), Gavin's adoptive sister and Izzy and Josh's aunt.
- Virginie Laverdure as Dr. Sophia Nathan (season 1), a United States Department of Defense operative who is investigating the sinkhole.
- Toby Truslove as Senior Agent Adam Markman (season 1), a United States Department of Defense operative and Dr. Nathan's co-worker who is investigating the sinkhole.
- Pacharo Mzembe as Tony Greene (season 1), a man who fell down a sinkhole. While in 10,000 BC, he repairs a Jeep.
- Stephen Lopez as Billy Fisher (season 1), Tony's husband who fell down the sinkhole.
- Damien Fotiou as Judah, a man who fell down the sinkhole.
- Ming-Zhu Hii as Dr. Rebecca Aldridge (seasons 1–2), a government scientist who knows more about time portals and sinkholes than she lets on and seemingly influences the actions of other characters.
- Mark Lee as Silas (seasons 1–2), an old man residing in the fort in 10,000 BC. He is Isaiah's grandfather and Caroline's father, making him Izzy and Josh's great-grandfather.
- Martin Sensmeier as Taamet (season 2), the leader of the Exiles who speaks the Tongva language due to being Paara's ex-husband. After Scott attacks him and he is dying from a dagger wound, he tells Gavin and Sam that Kiera hired him to raid the clearing for a book Aaron had in his possession.
- Jonno Roberts as James Mallet (season 2), the Director of the Lazarus Project from 2076 who is Gavin's long-lost father, Helena's father, and Izzy and Josh's grandfather. Before dying from a gunshot wound following a struggle with Gavin, he advises Gavin to tell his sister, who will come for him, that their father has failed.
- Melissa Neal as Caroline Clark (season 2), a scientist from 2076 who is Silas' daughter, Isaiah/Gavin's mother, and Josh and Izzy's grandmother. She is a former leader of the Lazarus Project who traveled to 1988 to find the cause and stop the creation of the sinkholes that were created as a result of the Lazarus Project. Caroline is later killed by Kiera.
- Simone McAullay as Kiera (season 2), a member of the Lazarus Project and James' personal assistant, who has an agenda of her own.
- Chantelle Jamieson as Ruth (season 3), a member of Paara's tribe who runs the fort while Paara is away
- Edyll Ismail as Leyla (season 3), Ruth's daughter and expert archer who befriends Izzy
- Claudia Ware as Maya Schmidt (season 3), the manipulative head of the Reisander Group who Gavin knew under her "Sierra" alias. During the series finale, she is killed by Helena.
- Emily Wiseman as Helena (season 3), James' daughter and Gavin's half-sister who opposes the Reisander Group

== Episodes ==
=== Series overview ===
Season	Episodes	Originally released	
Season	Episodes	First released	Last released
1	10	September 28, 2021	November 30, 2021
2	14	September 27, 2022	February 28, 2023
3	6	January 9, 2024	February 13, 2024

=== Season 1 (2021) ===
No. overall	No. in season	Title	Directed by	Written by	Original air date	U.S. viewers (millions)
1	1	"Pilot"	Thor Freudenthal	David Appelbaum	September 28, 2021	6.37
On September 26, 2021, a massive sinkhole opens up in Los Angeles at the site of the La Brea tar pits. In the chaos, Eve Harris and her children Izzy and Josh attempt to escape, but Eve and Josh both fall into the hole. However, Eve and Josh, along with other survivors, survive and wake up in a mysterious primitive world. Eve befriends therapist Ty Coleman, while Josh befriends Riley Velez, daughter of doctor Sam Velez. The land turns hostile when a woman named Veronica loses her apparent father Aaron to a dire wolf attack and Eve and Ty are attacked by a saber-toothed tiger. Meanwhile, Gavin Harris, Eve's husband, has visions of a mysterious location where he believes Eve is. He meets with Izzy and they speak to military officials to begin an investigation.
2	2	"Day Two"	Cherie Nowlan	David Appelbaum	October 5, 2021	5.05
3	3	"The Hunt"	Adam Davidson	Jose Molina	October 12, 2021	5.06
4	4	"The New Arrival"	Thor Freudenthal	Zakiyyah Alexander	October 19, 2021	5.12
5	5	"The Fort"	Greg McLean	Arika Lisanne Mittman	October 26, 2021	5.20
6	6	"The Way Home"	Adam Davidson	Steven Lilien & Bryan Wynbrandt	November 2, 2021	4.03
7	7	"The Storm"	Thor Freudenthal	Aiyana White	November 9, 2021	4.70
8	8	"Origins"	Cherie Nowlan	Jessica Granger & Andre Edmonds	November 16, 2021	4.67
9	9	"Father and Son"	Thor Freudenthal	Arika Lisanne Mittman	November 23, 2021	4.33
10	10	"Topanga"	Adam Davidson	David Appelbaum	November 30, 2021	4.94

=== Season 2 (2022–23) ===
No. overall	No. in season	Title	Directed by	Written by	Original air date	U.S. viewers (millions)
11	1	"The Next Day"	Adam Davidson	David Appelbaum & Steven Lilien & Bryan Wynbrandt	September 27, 2022	3.86
12	2	"The Cave"	Adam Davidson	Rob Wright	October 4, 2022	3.90
13	3	"The Great Escape"	David M. Barrett	Arika Lisanne Mittman	October 11, 2022	3.54
14	4	"The Fog"	Ron Underwood	Andre Edmonds	October 18, 2022	3.38
15	5	"The Heist"	David M. Barrett	Jessica Granger	October 25, 2022	3.47
16	6	"Lazarus"	Adam Davidson	Bisanne Masoud	November 1, 2022	3.47
17	7	"1988"	Dan Liu	Erica Meredith	November 15, 2022	3.31
18	8	"Stampede"	Christine Moore	Russel Friend	January 31, 2023	2.20
19	9	"Murder in the Clearing"	Nick Gomez	Peter Beals & Onalee Hunter Hughes	January 31, 2023	2.02
20	10	"The Return"	Greg McLean	Rob Wright	February 14, 2023	2.12
21	11	"The Wedding"	Tara Miele	Jerome Schwartz	February 21, 2023	1.98
22	12	"The Swarm"	Rose Troche	Christopher Hollier	February 21, 2023	1.72
23	13	"The Journey, Part 1"	Cherie Nowlan	David Appelbaum	February 28, 2023	1.92
24	14	"The Journey, Part 2"	Adam Davidson	David Appelbaum	February 28, 2023	1.77

=== Season 3 (2024) ===
No. overall	No. in season	Title	Directed by	Written by	Original air date	U.S. viewers (millions)
25	1	"Sierra"	Ron Underwood	David Appelbaum	January 9, 2024	2.42
26	2	"Don't Look Up"	Ron Underwood	Christopher Hollier	January 16, 2024	2.18
27	3	"Maya"	Cherie Nowlan	Rob Wright	January 23, 2024	2.14
28	4	"Fire Storm"	Cherie Nowlan	Onalee Hunter Hughes	January 30, 2024	2.15
29	5	"The Road Home, Part 1"	Nick Gomez	Jerome Schwartz	February 6, 2024	2.06
30	6	"The Road Home, Part 2"	David M. Barrett	David Appelbaum	February 13, 2024	2.03

== Production ==
=== Development ===
On January 15, 2020, La Brea was given a pilot order by NBC. The pilot was directed by Thor Freudenthal and written by David Appelbaum who was expected to executive produce alongside Avi Nir, Alon Shtruzman, Peter Traugott, Ken Woodruff and Rachel Kaplan. The production companies involved with the series are Keshet Studios and Universal Television. On January 12, 2021, NBC gave production a series order for a 10-episode first season. The series is created by Appelbaum.

On November 12, 2021, NBC renewed the series for a 14-episode second season.

On January 31, 2023, NBC renewed the series for a six-episode third season. The cast originally had contracts requiring payments for at least ten episodes per season; the cast accepted an offer to be released from their contracts so they would be free to pursue work on other shows after the season in exchange for reducing that number to six. On November 20, 2023, it was reported that the third season would be the final season.

=== Casting ===
In February 2020, Michael Raymond-James, Karina Logue, Zyra Gorecki, Caleb Ruminer, Angel Parker, Catherine Dent, Veronica St. Clair, Jag Bal, and Chiké Okonkwo were cast as series regulars while Natalie Zea was cast as the lead role. In March 2020, Jon Seda and Rita Angel Taylor joined the main cast. On March 4, 2021, Eoin Macken and Jack Martin were cast to replace Raymond-James and Ruminer, respectively and Lily Santiago joined the main cast. In addition, the surname of the family has been changed to Harris. On March 22, 2021, Nicholas Gonzalez and Rohan Mirchandaney joined the cast as series regulars. In April 2021, Josh McKenzie was cast as a series regular while Ione Skye was cast in a recurring role and Chloe De Los Santos was cast to replace Taylor. On May 12, 2022, Tonantzin Carmelo and Michelle Vergara Moore were promoted to series regulars for the second season. On July 15, 2022, Jonno Roberts joined the cast in a recurring role for the second season. On September 22, 2022, Martin Sensmeier was cast in a recurring capacity for the second season.

=== Filming ===
The series began filming in Melbourne, Australia, on May 3, 2021, and wrapped up in September 2021. The main photography of the series was shot in regional Victoria. The recordings for the first season were completed in September. The effects-heavy production spent $71 million in Australia, more than $60 million of it in Victoria. It is the most expensive TV production in Victoria since Steven Spielberg's HBO series The Pacific completed in 2009. The second season was scheduled to film in Victoria, Australia in the spring of 2022. On May 23, 2023, it was reported that filming for the third season was set to begin soon in Queensland, Australia.

== Release ==
In the USA, the series premiered on September 28, 2021 on NBC. The second season premiered on September 27, 2022 on NBC. The third and final season premiered on January 9, 2024. The series finale aired on February 13, 2024. In Canada, the series aired on CTV. In Australia, it aired on 9Now. In Germany, La Brea premiered on Sky One on April 24, 2022. In Italy - La Brea premiered on Italia 1 on June 8, 2022. In the UK, the first episode of La Brea aired on Channel 5 on August 1, 2022 to promote the series, with the entire first series being added to Paramount+ on the same day. The series also premiered on 5USA on April 22, 2023. In Ireland, the first series was added in full to Paramount+ on August 1, 2022.

== Reception ==
=== Critical response ===
The review aggregator website Rotten Tomatoes reported a 29% approval rating with an average rating of 4.5/10, based on 21 critic reviews. The website's critics consensus reads, "There may be method to its madness, but La Brea simply doesn't commit to its insane premise hard enough to shake out a show worth watching—at least not yet." Metacritic, which uses a weighted average, assigned a score of 49 out of 100 based on 7 critics, indicating "mixed or average reviews". In reviewing the series pilot, the television critic for The Globe and Mail wrote "The series is so wretchedly bad, it is gripping in its awfulness" while the reviewer for SCIFI.radio wrote that "La Brea is everything I hate in network television science fiction" and mentions the many scientific improbabilities in the first episode such as the "statistically unlikely number of survivors" from falling after exiting a time portal suspended hundreds of feet in the primeval sky that should have killed everyone. The reviewer for The Guardian liked the series for being "gloriously, brazenly bad" while giving the series one out of five stars when the series debuted in the UK in 2022.

=== Ratings ===
==== Overall ====
Viewership and ratings per season of La Brea
Season	Timeslot (ET)	Episodes	First aired		Last aired		TV season
Season	Timeslot (ET)	Episodes	Date	Viewers (millions)	Date	Viewers (millions)	TV season
1	Tuesday 9:00 p.m.	10	September 28, 2021	6.37	November 30, 2021	4.94	2021–22
2	Tuesday 9:00 p.m. (1–8, 10–11, 13); Tuesday 10:00 p.m. (9, 12, 14)	14	September 27, 2022	3.86	February 28, 2023	1.77	2022–23
3	Tuesday 9:00 p.m.	6	January 9, 2024	2.42	February 13, 2024	2.03	2023–24

==== Season 1 ====
Viewership and ratings per episode of La Brea
No.	Title	Air date	Rating (18–49)	Viewers (millions)	DVR (18–49)	DVR viewers (millions)	Total (18–49)	Total viewers (millions)
1	"Pilot"	September 28, 2021	0.8	6.37	—N/a	—N/a	—N/a	—N/a
2	"Day Two"	October 5, 2021	0.6	5.05	—N/a	—N/a	—N/a	—N/a
3	"The Hunt"	October 12, 2021	0.6	5.05	0.3	2.58	1.0	7.64
4	"The New Arrival"	October 19, 2021	0.6	5.12	0.3	2.57	0.9	7.69
5	"The Fort"	October 26, 2021	0.6	5.20	—N/a	—N/a	—N/a	—N/a
6	"The Way Home"	November 2, 2021	0.4	4.03	—N/a	—N/a	—N/a	—N/a
7	"The Storm"	November 9, 2021	0.6	4.70	—N/a	—N/a	—N/a	—N/a
8	"Origins"	November 16, 2021	0.6	4.67	0.4	2.41	1.0	7.08
9	"Father and Son"	November 23, 2021	0.5	4.33	0.3	2.28	0.8	6.62
10	"Topanga"	November 30, 2021	0.5	4.94	0.3	2.18	0.9	7.12

==== Season 2 ====
Viewership and ratings per episode of La Brea
No.	Title	Air date	Rating (18–49)	Viewers (millions)	DVR (18–49)	DVR viewers (millions)	Total (18–49)	Total viewers (millions)
1	"The Next Day"	September 27, 2022	0.5	3.86	0.3	2.16	0.8	6.02
2	"The Cave"	October 4, 2022	0.4	3.90	0.2	2.03	0.6	5.93
3	"The Great Escape"	October 11, 2022	0.4	3.54	0.2	1.78	0.6	5.31
4	"The Fog"	October 18, 2022	0.3	3.38	0.2	1.80	0.5	5.18
5	"The Heist"	October 25, 2022	0.4	3.47	0.2	1.60	0.6	5.07
6	"Lazarus"	November 1, 2022	0.3	3.47	0.2	1.58	0.5	5.04
7	"1988"	November 15, 2022	0.4	3.31	0.2	1.73	0.6	5.04
8	"Stampede"	January 31, 2023	0.3	2.20	—N/a	—N/a	—N/a	—N/a
9	"Murder in the Clearing"	January 31, 2023	0.2	2.02	—N/a	—N/a	—N/a	—N/a
10	"The Return"	February 14, 2023	0.3	2.12	—N/a	—N/a	—N/a	—N/a
11	"The Wedding"	February 21, 2023	0.2	1.98	—N/a	—N/a	—N/a	—N/a
12	"The Swarm"	February 21, 2023	0.2	1.72	—N/a	—N/a	—N/a	—N/a
13	"The Journey, Part 1"	February 28, 2023	0.2	1.92	—N/a	—N/a	—N/a	—N/a
14	"The Journey, Part 2"	February 28, 2023	0.2	1.77	—N/a	—N/a	—N/a	—N/a

==== Season 3 ====
Viewership and ratings per episode of La Brea
No.	Title	Air date	Rating (18–49)	Viewers (millions)
1	"Sierra"	January 9, 2024	0.2	2.42
2	"Don't Look Up"	January 16, 2024	0.2	2.18
3	"Maya"	January 23, 2024	0.2	2.14
4	"Fire Storm"	January 30, 2024	0.2	2.15
5	"The Road Home, Part 1"	February 6, 2024	0.2	2.06
6	"The Road Home, Part 2"	February 13, 2024	0.2	2.03

=== Accolades ===
The series was one of 94 out of the 200 most-popular scripted television series that received the ReFrame Stamp for the years 2021 to 2022. The stamp is awarded by the gender equity coalition ReFrame and industry database IMDbPro for film and television projects that are proven to have gender-balanced hiring, with stamps being awarded to projects that hire female-identifying people, especially women of color, in four out of eight key roles for their production.

Accolades received by La Brea
Award	Date of ceremony	Category	Recipient	Result	Ref.
People's Choice Awards	December 7, 2021	Sci-Fi/Fantasy Show of 2021	La Brea	Nominated	
People's Choice Awards	December 6, 2022	Sci-Fi/Fantasy Show of 2022	La Brea	Nominated	
Saturn Awards	October 25, 2022	Best Fantasy Television Series: Network / Cable	La Brea	Nominated	

== See also ==
- Terra Nova, a Steven Spielberg-produced TV series about a 22nd-century family migrating from a dystopian America via a time portal to a colony set in the wilderness of the Cretaceous period.
- Time Spike, an Eric Flint novel about a 21st-century maximum security prison transported back in time to a Cretaceous period Earth via an exchange of an equivalent mass of Cretaceous land. This novel includes a subplot in which the U.S. government was using FEMA to hide the incident from the American public by claiming that Middle Eastern terrorists blew up the prison in such a way to make the area unsafe for entry by ordinary citizens.
- Land of the Lost, 1970s children's show of a family in a pocket universe trying to find a way back to their own. Remade twice in 1991 and in 2009.
- A Sound of Thunder, a film based on the 1952 short story of the same name by Ray Bradbury, about "time tourists" who accidentally interfere too much with the past, completely altering the present. Time travel has become a practical reality, and the company Time Safari, Inc. offers wealthy adventurers the chance to travel back in time to hunt extinct species such as dinosaurs.
- Primeval, a British TV series in which prehistoric creatures come through to the present via temporal anomalies which spring up around the country.
