= Jason Ning =

TV writer, showrunner, producer, attorney

- Born: Albuquerque, New Mexico, United States
- Education: Southern Methodist University (BAPSc); Dedman School of Law (JD)
- Occupations: Television writer; showrunner; director; producer; attorney
- Writing career
- Years active: 2005–present

Jason Ning is a screenwriter, showrunner, producer, and former attorney best known for his extensive work on Lucifer, S.W.A.T. Exiles, Perception, and the 2008 90210 reboot. He recently renewed his overall production deal with Sony Pictures Television in 2023, and is adapting Crouching Tiger, Hidden Dragon and the other four novels in Wang Dulu’s Crane Iron Pentalogy into a television series.

== Career ==
Ning grew up in Albuquerque, New Mexico, before moving to Texas where he earned a Bachelor of Arts in Political Science and a Juris Doctor from Southern Methodist University in Dallas, Texas. He began his legal career as an entertainment attorney for DreamWorks SKG before moving to Sony Pictures Entertainment, and then transitioned to a career in screenwriting.

Ning has written, produced, executive-produced, and developed pilots, television show episodes, and TV movies for several major television networks. Currently a mentor in writer fellowship organization CAPE (Coalition of Asian Pacifics in Entertainment), Ning will also be adapting novel series War Arts Saga into a television series.

== Personal life ==
Ning lives in Santa Monica, California with his wife and two children.

== Writing credits ==
Year	Title	Notes	Ref
2005–2007	Crossing Jordan	Season 5: "A Man in Blue", "Blame Game"; Season 6: "Night of the Living Dead", "In Sickness & In Health"; Also: Exec. Story Editor for 17 Episodes	
2008	Burn Notice	Season 2: "Comrades"; Also: Exec. Story Editor for 3 Episodes	
2008–2009	90210	Season 1: "Model Behavior", "Help Me, Rhonda"; Also: Exec. Story Editor for 20 Episodes	
2012	Blowing Sunshine	NBCUniversal-commissioned scripted drama pilot (for premium network Bravo's move to include scripted programming in its schedule) centering on the staff and patients at a private rehab center that was not picked up.; Also: Executive Producer	
2012	Legacy	Fox-commissioned pilot about cop families on the two sides of the U.S.-Mexico border that was not picked up.; Also: Executive Producer	
2012–2015	Perception	Season 1: "The Messenger", "Lovesick"; Season 2: "Ch-Ch-Changes", "Curveball"; Season 3: "Painless", "Brainstorm"; Also: Supervising Producer, Producer, or Co-Producer for 37 Episodes	
2014	Killer Women	Season 1: "Warrior"; Also: Supervising Producer for 7 Episodes	
2015	The Mysteries of Laura	Season 1: "The Mystery of the Exsanguinated Ex"	
2016	The Expanse	Season 1: "Rock Bottom"; Also: Supervising Producer for 10 Episodes	
2016–2021	Lucifer	Season 1: "The Would-Be Prince of Darkness", "Favorite Son"; Season 2: "Weaponizer", "God Johnson"; Season 3: "What Would Lucifer Do?", "City of Angels?", "My Brother's Keeper", "The Angel of San Bernardino"; Season 4: "O, Ye of Little Faith, Father", "Super Bad Boyfriend"; Season 5: "Really Sad Devil Guy", "Is This Really How It's Going To End?!"; Also: Executive Producer, Co-Executive Producer, or Supervising Producer for 66 Episodes	
2019	Always a Witch	Season 1: "Ouija", "The Ritual of Forgetting"	
2020	Escape	NBC-commissioned Action-Thriller Drama Pilot later adapted into a TV Movie.; Also: Executive Producer	
2022	Silk: Spider Society	Amazon Prime Video-commissioned Marvel Studios project that was shelved while in development.; Also: Co-Executive Producer	
2023	Mrs. Davis	Season 1: "A Great Place to Drink to Gain Control of Your Drink", "Great Gatsby 2001: A Space Odyssey"; Also: Co-Executive Producer for 7 Episodes	
2024	The Brothers Sun	Season 1: "Gymkata"; Also: Co-Executive Producer for 8 Episodes	
2026–present	S.W.A.T. Exiles	Season 1: "Clean Entry", "Hard Exit"; Also: Co-Executive Producer and Showrunner	
Upcoming	Crouching Tiger, Hidden Dragon		
Upcoming	War Arts Saga		
