= Ezra Franky =

Canadian actress and singer

- Franky in 2026
- Born: Vancouver, British Columbia, Canada
- Occupation: Actress, Singer
- Years active: 2022–present
- Notable work: Untamed, Yaga

Ezra Franky is a Canadian actress and singer. She is best known for playing Lucy in the Netflix crime drama Untamed.

Franky made her on-screen debut in the short film Going Back to Meet the World. She then played the lead role of an AI girlfriend in another short film Waifu 3000. Her first big role came playing Lucy in the Netflix crime drama series Untamed. Outside of acting she is also a popular musician. She started making music due to the uncertainty of her acting career. She released an album in June 2025 called Acoustish. Old Man of the Woods is her favourite of her songs.

Franky was born in Lethbridge Alberta. She graduated from the Simon Fraser University. She is of Indigenous descent.

== Filmography ==
=== Film ===
Year	Title	Role	Notes
2022	Going Back to Meet the World	Ezra	Short
2024	Waifu 3000	Waifu 3000	Short

=== Television ===
Year	Title	Role	Notes
2025-	Untamed	Lucy	5 episodes
2026	Yaga	Pam	Upcoming series
