= Lily Santiago =

American actress

- Education: Fiorello H. LaGuardia High School
- Occupation: Actress
- Years active: 2021–present
- Television: La Brea; Untamed
- Spouse: Sam Nix (m. 2025)
- Father: Ruben Santiago-Hudson

Lily Santiago is an American stage and screen actress. She appeared in the NBC science fiction series La Brea (2021–2024) and the Netflix crime drama Untamed (2025).

== Early life and education ==
The daughter of writer and actor Ruben Santiago-Hudson and Jeannie Brittan, Lily Santiago was educated in New York City at Fiorello H. LaGuardia High School for the Performing Arts. She has a brother who is also an actor.

== Career ==
After working in New York City theatre, she had her first regular series role on network television when she appeared as Veronica Castillo in three seasons of La Brea from 2021 on NBC.

She made her Broadway theatre debut in 2024 in Mary Jane at the Samuel J. Friedman Theatre.

In 2025 Santiago played a lead role in the 2025 Netflix murder mystery series Untamed alongside Eric Bana and Sam Neill, as single mother and Yosemite Park ranger Naya Vasquez. She had to learn how to ride a horse for the show.

In October 2026, she joined the cast of sports film The Comebacker.

== Personal life ==
Santiago met fellow actor Sam Nix in 2021 and they became engaged in 2024. They married the following year on 5 September 2025, with the ceremony at a New York City winery.

== Partial filmography ==
Year	Title	Role	Notes
2005	Lackawanna Blues	Laura's daughter	
2021	Screwed		1 episode
2021–2024	La Brea	Veronica Castillo	30 episodes
2023	Vineyards	Taylor	Film
2025	Untamed	Naya Vasquez	Lead role
TBA	Ally Clark		Film
