= Sissy (film) =

2022 film by Hannah Barlow and Kane Senes

- Directed by: Hannah Barlow; Kane Senes
- Written by: Hannah Barlow; Kane Senes
- Starring: Aisha Dee; Hannah Barlow; Emily De Margheriti; Daniel Monks; Yerin Ha; Lucy Barrett
- Cinematography: Steve Arnold
- Music by: Kenneth Lampl
- Distributed by: Shudder
- Release date: 2022
- Running time: 102 minutes
- Language: English

Sissy is a 2022 Australian indie psychological horror film written and directed by Hannah Barlow and Kane Senes and starring Aisha Dee in the title role as Cecilia (aka Sissy), a successful social media influencer who is invited to a bachelorette weekend by her close childhood friend before it turns into a nightmare, costarring Hannah Barlow, Emily De Margheriti, Daniel Monks, Yerin Ha, and Lucy Barrett.

== Plot ==
Successful lifestyle vlogger Cecilia reunites with her childhood best friend Emma while shopping at a pharmacy. Emma calls Cecilia "Sissy," to Cecilia's chagrin. After exchanging contact information, Emma reveals that she is engaged to a woman named Fran and invites Cecilia to her engagement party, and later to her bachelorette party.

While Cecilia is driving to the party with Emma, Fran, and their friends Tracey and Jamie, Fran mentions that Cecilia's former bully Alexandra "Alex" Kutis is joining them. Cecilia accidentally hits a kangaroo. When they all exit the car to inspect it, Cecilia imagines the bloodied, spasming creature as Alex. She runs over the kangaroo's head to put it out of its misery at Fran's insistence. Once they arrive at their destination, Cecilia is treated coldly by Alex, who belittles her profession, and rudely ignored by the other guests. Emma apologizes to Cecilia for Alex's behavior and encourages them to make amends.

At a lake the next day, Cecilia overhears Alex, Tracey, and Jamie badmouthing her. When Emma angrily storms off, all but Alex follow her. Cecilia approaches Alex and attempts to reconcile, but Alex steals her phone and films a video in which she informs Cecilia's followers that Cecilia had once tried to murder her. When Alex starts uploading the video, Cecilia bashes her head with a rock, seemingly killing her, retrieves her phone, and cancels the upload. It is revealed that when they were children, Alex repetitively taunted Cecilia until the latter struck Alex in the face with a gardening trowel, disfiguring her cheek.

Cecilia steals Alex's necklace, which matches one Emma also has, before dragging her body into the woods to bury her. She begins a livestream, calmly leading her followers in meditation and replanting an uprooted tree on top of the shallow grave. Jamie, who relies on a walking stick for mobility, arrives and tries to flee when he sees Alex's body, but Cecilia pushes him over a cliff to his death. Emma then falls into a river while searching for Alex.

Back at the house, Tracey reveals she knows what happened between Cecilia and Alex. Cecilia pushes Tracey into a bathtub and watches vacantly as Tracey drowns when her hair gets tangled in the plug. A still-alive Alex emerges from her grave, nearly blinded by her head wound. Cecilia picks up Fran on the road while searching for Emma, and confesses her heartbreak that she and Emma didn't remain best friends forever as they had promised to in their childhood. As Cecilia gets increasingly agitated, Fran tries to calm her, but Cecilia accelerates and suddenly brakes, ejecting Fran through the windshield. Cecilia then runs over Fran's head to end her suffering as Fran had done to the kangaroo earlier.

Alex finds Jamie's lost phone and manages to call the police, but cannot speak due to her head wound. The police trace the call before Jamie's phone dies. Cecilia arrives at the house and repeatedly beats herself in the face with her phone, then begins a livestream, claiming Alex attacked her and killed the others and begging her followers for help. Cecilia subsequently passes out and is awoken by Emma, to whom Cecilia relays the same story. Emma realizes the truth after finding Tracey's corpse under the bed and noticing Cecilia wearing Alex's necklace. Cecilia accidentally causes Emma to slip and knock herself out. When Emma awakens, Cecilia ties her to a chair and dyes and cuts Emma's hair so it more closely resembles Cecilia's. Emma frees herself and begins to fight back, eventually throwing the time capsule she and Cecilia made as children onto the fireplace, to Cecilia's horror. Cecilia reprimands Emma for her shallow behavior and self-serving navigation of friendships. As Emma calls the police, Cecilia attacks her. Emma eventually gains the upper hand, viciously beating Cecilia before Alex suddenly returns and, confusing Emma for Cecilia, bashes Emma's face in. When Cecilia thanks her, Alex realizes the error she has made and prepares to kill Cecilia, however the police arrive and fatally shoot Alex, believing her to have been the instigator.

Sometime later, now a famed survivor of the "Alex Kutis Massacre", Cecilia uses her channel to promote a book she has written.

== Cast ==
- Aisha Dee as Cecilia / Sissy
  - Amelia Lule as young Cecilia
- Hannah Barlow as Emma "Emm"
  - Camille Cumpston as young Emm
- Emily De Margheriti as Alexandra "Alex" Kutis
  - April Blasdall as young Alex
- Daniel Monks as Jamie
- Yerin Ha as Tracey
- Lucy Barrett as Fran
- Shaun Martindale as Senior Constable Martindale
- Molly Brownlow as Pregnant Lady

== Release ==
The film had its official premiere at the 2022 South by Southwest where it was the opening night film of the Midnighters program. It was distributed by the streaming service Shudder.

== Reception ==
On Rotten Tomatoes, the film has an approval rating of 96% based on 72 reviews, with an average rating of 6.4/10. The website's critical consensus reads, "Sissy weaves timely themes into its rich blend of horror and dark humor, topped off by terrific work from a talented cast led by Aisha Dee." Metacritic, which uses a weighted average, assigned the film a score of 67 out of 100, based on 7 critics, indicating "generally favorable" reviews.

In his review on The Guardian Luke Buckmaster praised "Aisha Dee’s painfully good performance" as well as the satirical elements which added a "perhaps unexpected level of depth to a film that is impressively unpredictable all the way to the bitter end." Jon Mendelsohn of Comic Book Resources described the film as "Heathers by way of Texas Chainsaw Massacre with a modern twist - basically, a must-see film."

The film was nominated for three AACTA Awards, for best film, best direction, and best lead actress (Aisha Dee). Jamie Dunkin of Gamurs dubbed it the best horror film of 2022, praising its social commentary and "cringe-inducing violence."
