= The Comebacker =

American sports comedy film

- Directed by: Marielle Heller
- Screenplay by: Marielle Heller
- Based on: "The Comebacker" by Dave Eggers
- Produced by: Tom Hanks; Gary Goetzman; Leah Holzer
- Starring: Tom Hanks; Callum Turner; Patricia Clarkson; Amy Madigan; Sterling K. Brown
- Edited by: Anne McCabe
- Production companies: Columbia Pictures; Playtone; Defiant By Nature
- Distributed by: Sony Pictures Releasing
- Release date: July 30, 2027
- Country: United States
- Language: English

The Comebacker is an upcoming American sports comedy film written and directed by Marielle Heller, starring Tom Hanks, Callum Turner, Patricia Clarkson, and Amy Madigan. It is based on the short story by Dave Eggers.

The film is scheduled to be released on July 30, 2027, by Sony Pictures Releasing.

== Premise ==
A pitcher's life is upended when he is hit in the head by a line drive on the mound.

== Cast ==
- Tom Hanks as the pitching coach
- Callum Turner as the pitcher
- Patricia Clarkson as the pitching coach's wife
- Amy Madigan as the owner of the team
- Sterling K. Brown as the manager of the team
- Rauw Alejandro as Rico Gutiérrez
- Indiana Affleck
- Lily Santiago

== Production ==
In March 2026, it was announced that Marielle Heller and Tom Hanks would reunite to work on The Comebacker, based on the short story by Dave Eggers. Filming is set to begin in October 2026, as Republic Pictures, Focus Features, and Sony Pictures entered a bidding war, with Sony being the frontrunner. Colman Domingo and Bad Bunny were in negotiations to star in the film. In April 2026, Sony won the distribution rights. Callum Turner was announced as part of the cast in June. In August, Patricia Clarkson and Amy Madigan joined the cast. In October, Sterling K. Brown, Rauw Alejandro, Indiana Affleck, and Lily Santiago were added.

Filming began on October 1, 2026 in New York City.

== Release ==
The Comebacker is scheduled to release in theaters on July 30, 2027.
