= Ally Clark =

American film (post-production 2026)

- Directed by: Phillip Noyce
- Written by: Jose Ruisanchez; Irwin Winkler
- Produced by: Viola Davis; Irwin Winkler; Charles Winkler; David Winkler; Jose Ruisanchez; Davis Tennon; Julius Tennon
- Starring: Viola Davis; Jason Clarke; Benjamin Bratt; Jefferson White; Chris Sullivan; Peter Macon
- Cinematography: Simon Duggan
- Production companies: Winkler Films; JuVee Productions
- Distributed by: Amazon MGM Studios
- Country: United States
- Language: English

Ally Clark is an upcoming American thriller film directed by Phillip Noyce and written by Jose Ruisanchez and Irwin Winkler. It stars Viola Davis, Jason Clarke, Benjamin Bratt, Jefferson White, Chris Sullivan, and Peter Macon.

== Cast ==
- Viola Davis as Ally Clark
- Jason Clarke
- Benjamin Bratt
- Jefferson White
- Chris Sullivan
- Lily Santiago
- Peter Macon
- Alice Halsey
- Sydney Lemmon
- Jay Huguley

== Production ==
In June 2025, it was announced that Phillip Noyce would be directing a thriller film written by Jose Ruisanchez and Irwin Winkler, and Viola Davis in the lead role for Amazon MGM Studios. In March 2026, Jason Clarke and Benjamin Bratt joined the cast. In May 2026, Jefferson White, Chris Sullivan, Lily Santiago, Peter Macon, Alice Halsey, Sydney Lemmon, and Jay Huguley rounded out the cast.

Principal photography began on April 6, 2026, at Celtic Studios in Baton Rouge, Louisiana, and it is scheduled to wrap on June 1. Simon Duggan served as the cinematographer.
