= Emo the Musical =

2016 Australian film by Neil Triffett

- Film poster
- Directed by: Neil Triffett
- Written by: Neil Triffett
- Produced by: Lee Matthews
- Starring: Benson Jack Anthony; Jordan Hare; Rahart Adams; Jon Prasida; Lucy Barrett; Craig Hyde-Smith; Ben Bennett; Geraldine Viswanathan; Bridie Carter
- Edited by: Ian Carmichael
- Music by: Neil Triffett; Craig Pilkington; Charlotte Nicdao
- Production company: Matthewswood Productions
- Release date: August 1, 2016 (MIFF)
- Running time: 94 minutes
- Country: Australia
- Language: English
- Budget: AUD$1.9 million

Emo the Musical is a 2016 Australian musical comedy film written and directed by Neil Triffett. It is also the title of a 2014 short film, also directed by Triffett, upon which the feature is based.

== Short ==
The 16-minute short film stars Harry Borland as a sullen high-school student who falls in love with a blindly optimistic Christian girl Trinity (Charlotte Nicdao), much to the annoyance of his angst-filled bandmates and her evangelistic brethren.

It was financed in part by Screen Australia.

The short received a Crystal Bear Special Mention for Best Short Film at the Berlin International Film Festival. The award recognizes "outstanding achievement" and is one of eight awards in the "Generation 14plus" division.

== Feature ==
Emo the Musical premiered on 12 August 2016 at the Melbourne International Film Festival. It was also selected to screen at the Berlin International Film Festival (Berlinale) in February 2017. The film was released in Australian cinemas 4 May 2017. The film was screened in Tel Aviv Cinematheque on 30 August 2017 as part of TLVFest monthly program.

Filming of the feature took place in the Melbourne metropolitan area throughout December 2015 and January 2016 and funding for the film was provided by a successful crowdfunding campaign, Screen Australia, Film Victoria, and the MIFF Premiere Fund.

=== Plot ===
Ethan, an emo, gets expelled from his private-school after attempting to hang himself in the school courtyard. On his first day at his new school – the dilapidated Seymour High - he meets Trinity, a beautiful (but totally naïve) Catholic girl who is desperate to convert him to Jesus. But joining the Catholic Christians is the last thing on Ethan's mind. What he really wants is to join the school alternative rock band, ‘Worst Day Ever’ and to be part of the Emo clique, led by the enigmatic and dangerous Bradley who has a rivalry with Isaac, the leader of the Christian clique and band. After a successful audition, Ethan is welcomed into the Emo world and embraces his image – complete with black eyeliner and a violently possessive girlfriend, Roz. After being assigned to write a love song for class together, Trinity and Ethan meet up at Ethan's house. There, Trinity asks Ethan why he is an emo and he says that everyone pretends to be happy all the time and he would just rather be depressed. They then bond for a moment while listening to folk music before Trinity leaves. At school, having not done their assignment, Trinity sings a love song she made up at the last minute that seems to be about Ethan. Embarrassed, Ethan walks out of the classroom with Trinity following. Trinity kisses Ethan and Ethan kisses her back before they have to go to their next class. They meet again in the library and agree to hang out that night at Trinity's house. At Trinity's, Ethan tells her about his attempted suicide at his previous school, and then admits it wasn't real and he had done it six times before. He was just lonely and thought that was what emos did and he couldn't actually do it. Trinity promises not to tell anyone. Before Ethan leaves, Trinity gives him her copy of the Bible from her parents. Looking for something to smoke during P.E., Jay, another member of 'Worst Day Ever', finds Trinity's Bible in Ethan's bag and shows it to Bradley who then realizes that Ethan and Trinity are together. Later, while on a movie date with Roz, Ethan breaks up with her and is confronted by Bradley with the Bible. Ethan defends himself by saying he was going to burn it and then does so in the theatre carpark. Bradley then forces Ethan to break up with Trinity and show her the remains of her bible. At a support group Trinity talks about Ethan and says that maybe Jesus doesn't mind if we are different or if we make mistakes and maybe even Jesus himself was an emo. Isaac, angry about Trinity's relationship with Ethan, gets information about Ethan from students at his previous school and puts flyers up around school calling him a 'faker'. Then, in order to insure they win the upcoming school music competition, Bradley, Ethan, Roz, and Jay sneak into the chapel at school and destroy the Christians' instruments. They attempt to burn the instruments too but the fire gets out of hand and the whole room burns down. The school then bans the expression of suicide, depression and violence in the lyrics of bands entering the competition and the Christians instruments are quickly replaced threatening the emos. While in the gym, Roz catches Peter, the Christians' guitarist, having a moment with another male student named Josh. Roz takes a picture of the two and sends it to Bradley, who tells Isaac. The rest of the band sneak into the gym to watch Josh and Peter and they kiss until Isaac catches them and tells Peter he has to send him back to conversion therapy. Ethan confronts Isaac and Peter but Bradley pulls him back and says that if Peter leaves, the Christians have no guitarist and 'Worst Day Ever' has a better chance of winning the competition. Ethan therefore, quits the band and Peter is taken away by Isaac. Ethan then attempts suicide at home by dropping a radio into his bathtub but it doesn't work. The next day, Ethan joins the Christian band at the last minute and plays onstage at the competition with Trinity and earns applause from the audience by adding electric guitar into the song. 'Worst Day Ever' is up next to play but before they can, Isaac goes to Mrs Doyle with evidence proving 'Worst Day Ever' were the ones who burned down the chapel and the band is disqualified. In a rage, Bradley holds a knife to Isaac's throat and threatens to cut him if they don't get to play. Ethan stands up and says that it was his fault the chapel burnt down and that he got to play so Bradley should too. 'Worst Day Ever' plays and Trinity and Ethan join in, adding in lyrics from other songs previously sung in the movie. Afterwards, Bradley and Ethan shake hands before Bradley is dragged away by police. Ethan and Trinity kiss and the movie ends with them walking down the street, discussing movies to watch while the credits roll.

=== Cast ===
- Benson Jack Anthony as Ethan, an emo who switched schools after fake attempting suicide.
- Jordan Hare as Trinity, a Christian who tries to make Ethan less emo.
- Rahart Adams as Bradley, leader of the emo clique
- Jon Prasida as Isaac, leader of the Christian clique
- Lucy Barrett as Roz, a basketball-playing emo
- Craig Hyde-Smith as Peter, a Christian who plays guitar, is secretly gay and is in a relationship with Josh
- Ben Bennett as Jay
- Geraldine Viswanathan as Jamali, a Christian “virgin” who gets pregnant with Isaac's baby.
- Kevin Clayette as Josh, an openly gay jock who is in a relationship with Peter
- Bridie Carter as Mrs Doyle
- Natasha Herbert as Susan
- Dylan Lewis as Doug Skeleton
- Adam Zwar as Principal Stephens
- Heidi Arena as Sister Kathleen
