= Zyra Gorecki =

American actress

- Born: July 4, 2002 (age 24); Michigan
- Occupation: Actress
- Years active: 2016–present

Zyra Gorecki is an American actress. She is best known for playing Izzy Harris in the sci-fi drama series La Brea and Cassidy Han in the action drama series S.W.A.T. Exiles.

== Early life ==
Gorecki grew up in rural Michigan. At the age of 13, she was trying to cut firewood for her family's woodstove, when a large log fell and crushed her foot. The injury was severe enough to lead to amputation. She was physically strong at the time of her amputation, so it only took her one day of rehab before she received her prosthetic leg. She then had four physical therapy sessions to work on her balance and bending her knee. Amputee Blade Runners provided her with blades at no cost.

Her first experience acting was in a second grade Christmas play. It was only after having her leg amputated that she wanted to become an actress full time. Gorecki wanted to inspire other amputees, so she decided to try modeling. After signing on with Bravo Talent Management, Gorecki’s agent sent her to acting auditions.

Despite being 6 foot tall, Gorecki is confident her prosthetic leg is the reason for not getting much callbacks.

== Career ==
Goorecki made her on screen debut as a pedestrian in the 100th episode of the police procedural drama series Chicago Fire. Her first big role came playing Izzy Harris in the sci-fi drama series La Brea. By portraying Izzy she made history for being the first limb-different actor to land a series regular role on television. She voiced Eren Kitt in three episodes of the animated series Star Wars: Young Jedi Adventures. In 2026 it was revealed she would play Cassidy Han, one of the lead characters in the action drama series S.W.A.T. Exiles starring Shemar Moore.

== Personal life ==
She suffers from stage fright. Her favourite actor is Heath Ledger while her favourite films are How the Grinch Stole Christmas and The Silence of the Lambs. She originally wanted to become a funeral director.

== Filmography ==
=== Film ===
Year	Title	Role	Notes
2018	Every Other Weekend	Daisy 2023	Short

=== Television ===
Year	Title	Role	Notes
2016	Chicago Fire	Stuck Pedestrian	Episode; One Hundred
2021-2024	La Brea	Izzy Harris	30 episodes
2024-2025	Star Wars: Young Jedi Adventures	Eren Kitt	3 episodes
2026-	S.W.A.T. Exiles	Cassidy Han	
