= Edyll Ismail =

Australian actress (born 1997)

Edyll
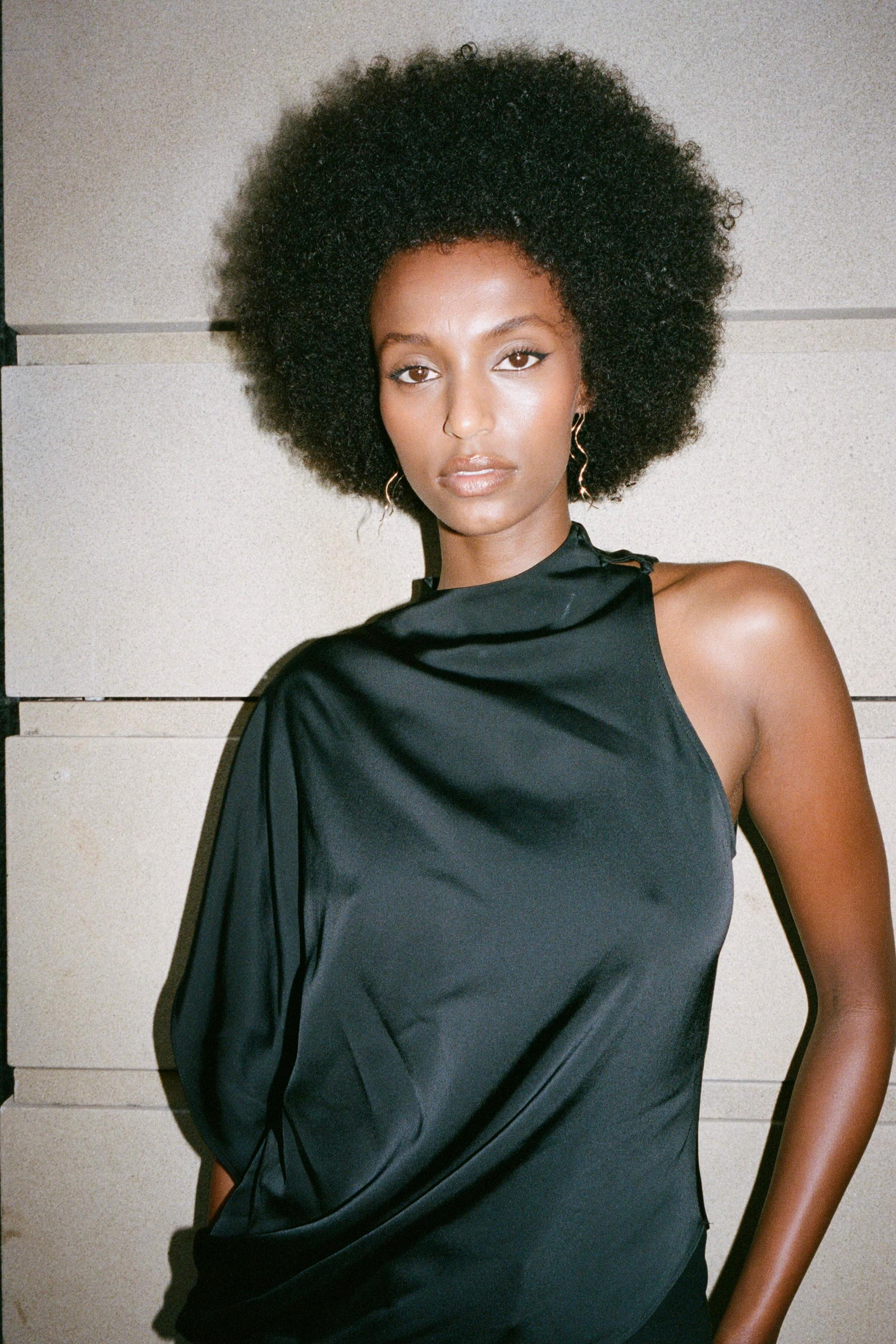
- Edyll in 2024
- Born: 1997 (age 28–29); Melbourne, Australia
- Occupation: Actress
- Years active: 2021–present

Edyll Ismail (/ɪdɪʟ ɪz.mɑːˈiːl /) is an Australian actress and model. She is best known for playing Leyla in the sci-fi series La Brea (2021-2024) and Zuri in the horror thriller film Send Help (2026).

== Early life ==
Ismail was born in 1997 in Melbourne, Australia to parents from Somalia. Her family moved them to Perth, Western Australia when she was five years old. Before becoming interested in acting, she studied Archaeology and Korean language at the University of Western Australia. She graduated with a degree in Acting from West Australian Academy of Performing Arts (WAAPA) in 2023.

== Career ==
Her first professional theatre debut was at Perth Festival where she performed in the play Whistleblower. Her first appearance on screen came in the short film Forever. In her graduating year at WAAPA, Edyll landed the role of Leyla in the NBC sci-fi series La Brea which introduced her to international audiences. She then gained international recognition as Zuri, the fiancée of Bradley (Dylan O'Brien) in the horror thriller film Send Help starring Rachel McAdams. Ismail also played one of the convicts in 4 episodes of the comedy Ghosts: Australia.

== Personal life ==
During her time at WAAPA, Ismail founded Tell Your Story, a program developed alongside Kalkidan Forward and WAAPA faculty members Gabrielle Metcalf and Emele Ugavule. The project focused on diversifying the performing arts by creating access to free training for young actors from underrepresented ethnic backgrounds.

== Filmography ==
=== Film ===
| Year | Title | Role | Notes | |
|---|---|---|---|---|
| 2023 | Forever | Portia | Short | |
| 2021 | Button Pusher | Madka | Short | |
| 2026 | Send Help | Zuri | | |
| 2026 | Hooyo | Samira | Short | Writer/Director |
| 2026 | Lol, Good Luck | Woman | Short | |

=== Television ===
| Year | Title | Role | Notes |
|---|---|---|---|
| 2024 | La Brea | Leyla | 5 episodes |
| 2025 | Ghosts | Convict #3 | 4 episodes |
