= Veronica St. Clair =

American actress

- Occupation: Actress
- Years active: 2013–present
- Partner(s): Michael Bradway (2023–present; engaged)

Veronica St. Clair is an American actress. She is best known for playing the role Riley Velez on the NBC drama La Brea.

== Early life ==
Born to a Cuban mother and Filipino-American father, St. Clair grew up in Burbank, California. She attended John Burroughs High School, graduating in 2012. She then attended the University of San Diego, where she pursued a Theatre and English degree and graduated cum laude in 2016. She is best friends with actress Dove Cameron.

== Career ==
St. Clair began her professional acting career with the La Jolla Playhouse in 2015. She starred in 'The Car Plays,' a series of intimate ten-minute plays, each taking place in a car. She reprised her role in the Off Center Festival at the Segerstrom Center for the Arts in 2018.

In addition, St. Clair has guest starred in the Golden Globe-winning limited series Unbelievable and Netflix's 13 Reasons Why.

== Personal life ==
St. Clair has been in a relationship with actor, Michael Bradway since 2023. The couple got engaged on February 23, 2025.

== Filmography ==
Year	Title	Role	Notes
2018	To the Beat!	Mandy	Film
2019	Unbelievable	Girlfriend	Guest Star
2020	13 Reasons Why	Heidi	Guest Star
2021–2024	La Brea	Riley Velez	Main Role
2023	Maybe It's You	Lexa	Film
2025	FBI: International	Special Agent Riley Quinn	Guest Star
