= Send Help =

2026 film by Sam Raimi

- Theatrical release poster
- Directed by: Sam Raimi
- Written by: Damian Shannon; Mark Swift
- Produced by: Sam Raimi; Zainab Azizi
- Starring: Rachel McAdams; Dylan O'Brien; Edyll Ismail; Xavier Samuel; Chris Pang; Dennis Haysbert
- Cinematography: Bill Pope
- Edited by: Bob Murawski
- Music by: Danny Elfman
- Production company: Raimi Productions
- Distributed by: 20th Century Studios
- Release dates: January 21, 2026 (TCL Chinese Theatre); January 30, 2026 (United States)
- Running time: 113 minutes
- Country: United States
- Language: English
- Budget: $40 million
- Box office: $94 million

Send Help is a 2026 black comedy survival horror film directed and produced by Sam Raimi and written by Damian Shannon and Mark Swift. The film stars Rachel McAdams and Dylan O'Brien as an employee and her boss, respectively, who become stranded on a desert island after a plane crash and attempt to survive while tension rises between them. Edyll Ismail, Xavier Samuel, Chris Pang, and Dennis Haysbert appear in supporting roles.

Send Help premiered at the TCL Chinese Theatre in Los Angeles, California on January 21, 2026, and was released in the United States by 20th Century Studios on January 30. The film received positive reviews from critics and grossed $94 million against a $40 million production budget.

== Plot ==
Socially awkward and downtrodden corporate strategist Linda Liddle anticipates a long-promised promotion from Bradley Preston, her late boss's son, upon his becoming CEO. Instead, Bradley promotes Donovan, a recent hire and former fraternity brother, while sidelining Linda in a dead-end role, citing her unattractiveness and lack of charisma much to the dismay of senior executive Franklin.

When Linda confronts him, Bradley, purporting to be impressed by her boldness, invites her to accompany him, Donovan, Chase, and another executive on a business trip to Bangkok to help finalize a company merger. During the flight, Donovan humiliates Linda by playing her audition tape for the Survivor TV show. While passing through a storm, the plane suffers engine failure and rapid altitude loss. During explosive decompression, Donovan attempts to strangle Linda and take her seat, but she stabs him with a fork. All occupants except Linda and Bradley are sucked from the aircraft before it crashes into the sea.

The next morning, Linda washes up on a remote island in the Gulf of Thailand and finds Bradley alive but badly injured. With no other survivors, Linda builds a shelter and secures food and water. Bradley relies on Linda but continues treating her as a subordinate. In response, Linda abandons him for two days. When she returns, Bradley is near collapse from dehydration. Though resentful, he gradually accepts her authority. Linda proves adept at survival, catching fish and killing a wild boar. While exploring the island's far side, Linda avoids signalling a passing boat.

As Bradley recovers, Linda teaches him survival skills. She claims the island's other side is filled with poisonous plants. One night, while drinking homemade fruit wine, she confesses she allowed her abusive husband to drive drunk, causing his death. Bradley appears sympathetic and offers to cook, but puts poisonous berries into the food so he can escape on a makeshift raft. Waves destroy the raft, and Linda, having survived, rescues Bradley.

In retaliation, Linda temporarily paralyzes Bradley with octopus toxin and pretends to castrate him, asserting control over him and their situation. While gathering fruit, Linda encounters Bradley's fiancée, Zuri, who arrived by boat after the official rescue effort ended. To protect her new life and purpose, Linda leads Zuri and the boat captain to an unstable cliff, where both fall to their deaths. She returns to camp, shaken and withdrawn, allowing Bradley to hunt alone. Bradley discovers Zuri's buried remains.

Confronted, Linda claims the deaths were accidental, but Bradley accuses her of murder and attacks her. In the ensuing fight, Bradley injures Linda's eye before she stabs him. Bradley escapes and discovers a luxurious beach house on the island's other side. Linda follows, confessing she knew about the house since seeing the first boat and that she caused Zuri and the captain's fatal fall. Linda threatens Bradley with an unloaded shotgun. Bradley pleads for his life, claiming he loves her and wants to remain on the island. However, Linda notices Bradley is concealing a weapon before he seizes the shotgun. Linda overpowers and kills him with a golf club.

A year later, a rescued Linda is now a wealthy and beloved celebrity, capitalizing on her sole survivor fame. At a celebrity golf tournament, Linda promotes a film adaptation of her best-selling memoir and announces she is going to write a self-help book, saying, "No help is coming, so you'd better start saving yourself." She then drives away.

== Cast ==
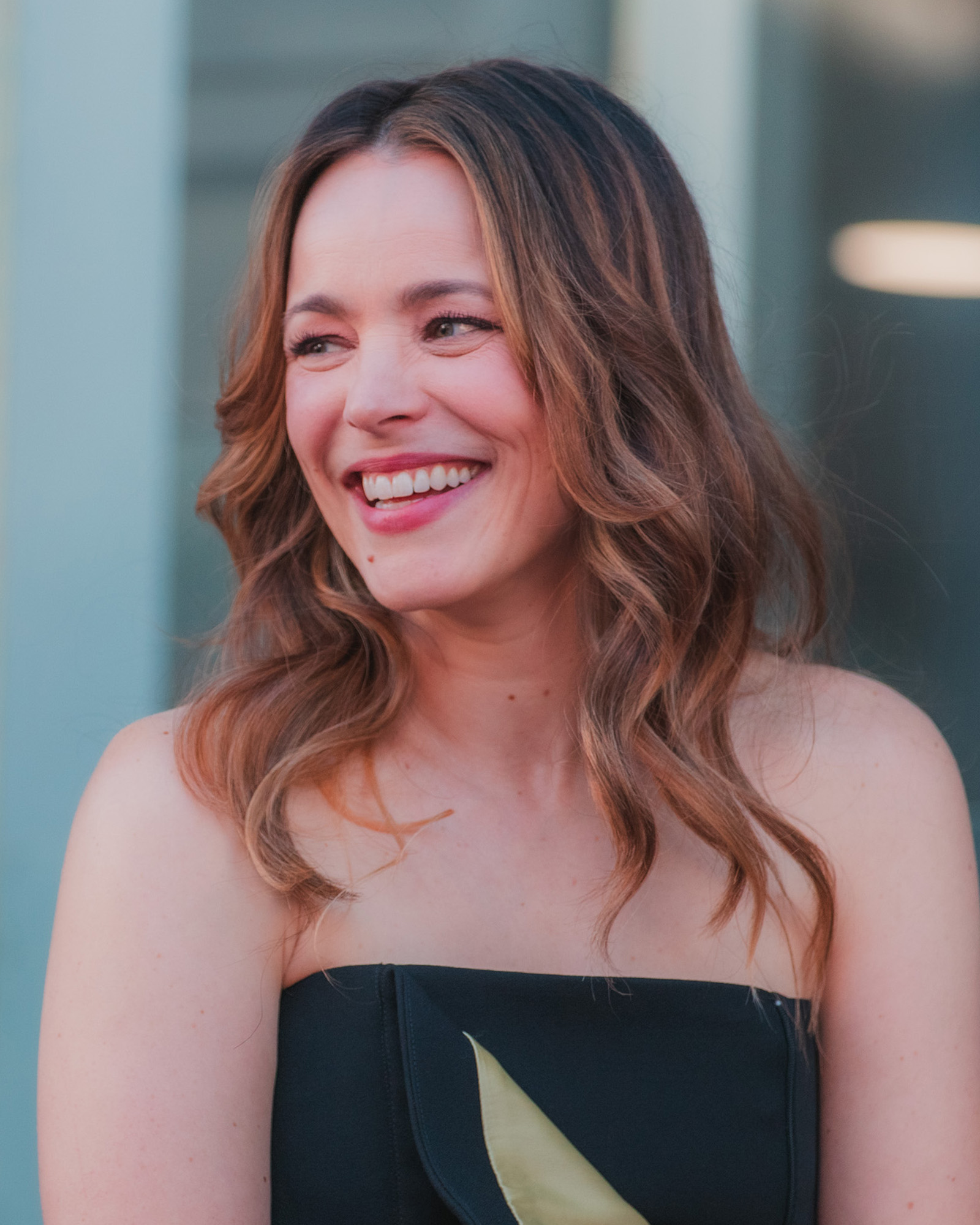
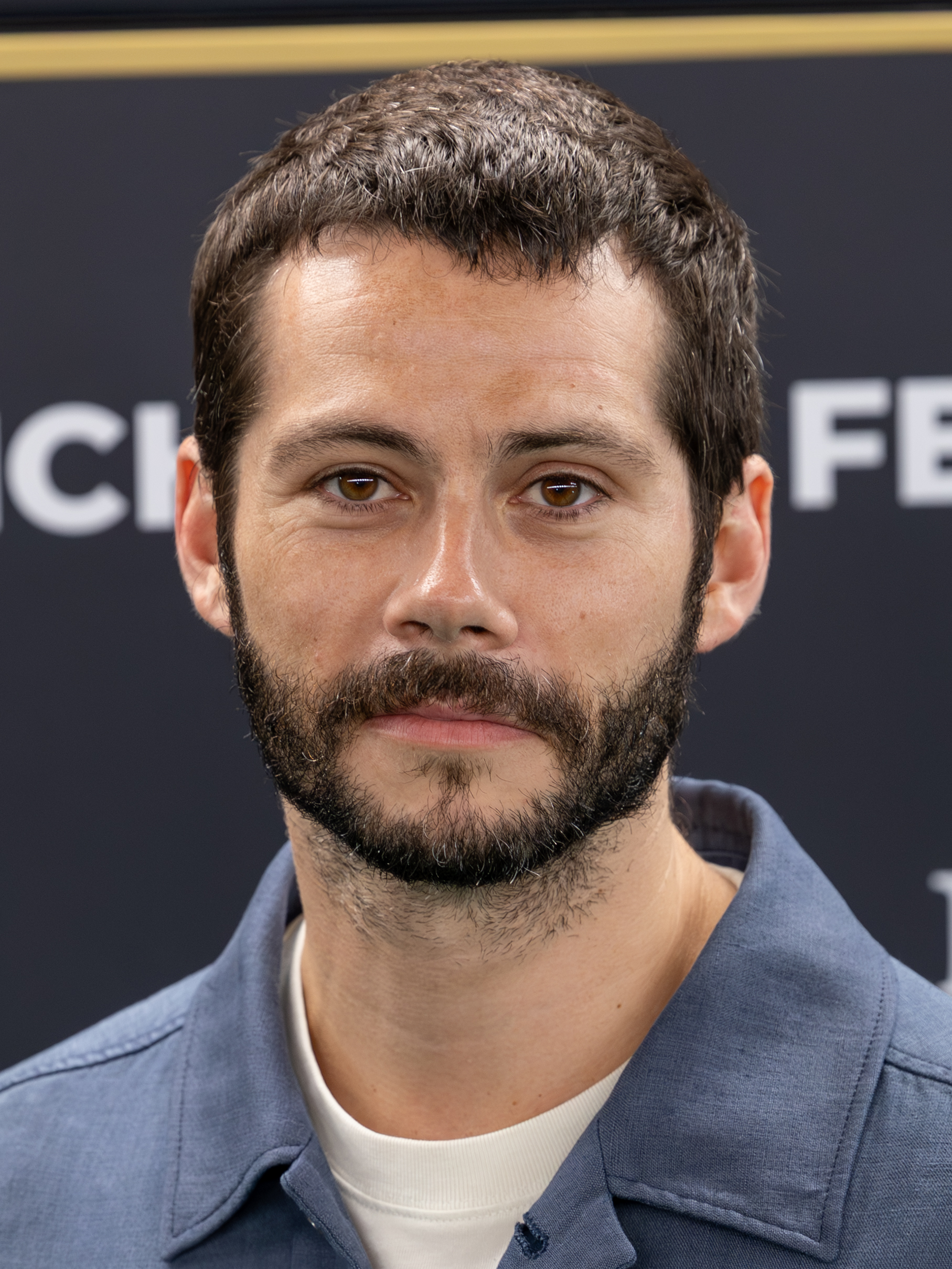
Lead actors Rachel McAdams (left) and Dylan O'Brien (right)
- Rachel McAdams as Linda Liddle, a strategist from a financial management company's Planning & Strategy Department and survival enthusiast
- Dylan O'Brien as Bradley Preston, the newly appointed CEO of the financial management company where Linda works
- Edyll Ismail as Zuri, Bradley's fiancée
- Dennis Haysbert as Franklin, a senior executive at Bradley's firm who is on good terms with Linda
- Xavier Samuel as Donovan Murphy, a former frat brother of Bradley's
- Chris Pang as Chase, one of Bradley's inner circle
- Thaneth Warakulnukroh as a boat captain who aids Zuri
- Emma Raimi as River, Linda's coworker
- Kristy Best as Polly Perera, a reporter who interviews Linda

Bruce Campbell makes photographic cameos as Bradley's unnamed father, the former CEO of the financial company who appears in several photographs and paintings seen in Bradley's office and had died at some point. Audio of Survivor host Jeff Probst is used, and there were plans for him to make a cameo as himself but he was forced to decline due to scheduling conflicts.

== Production ==
In October 2019, Columbia Pictures announced that Sam Raimi would direct an untitled horror film with Mark Swift and Damian Shannon writing the script. In an interview with TheWrap, Raimi revealed that Columbia, which Sony Pictures owns, initially wanted the film to be a streaming exclusive, but Raimi declined, wishing it to instead receive a theatrical release. The film would later be titled Send Help, with 20th Century Studios attached to distribute.

In October 2024, Rachel McAdams entered negotiations to star. Raimi had worked with McAdams in the Marvel Cinematic Universe (MCU) film Doctor Strange in the Multiverse of Madness (2022) and considered her underutilized in the movie. He therefore intended to showcase her talent in another project. In December, Chris Pang joined the cast. In early 2025, Dylan O'Brien and Dennis Haysbert joined the cast, with McAdams confirmed to star. Principal photography was scheduled to begin in January 2025. Filming ultimately began that February, in Sydney, Los Angeles, and Thailand, and concluded on April 17.

== Music ==
The soundtrack to Send Help was released by Hollywood Records on the same day as the film's release. The soundtrack contains 23 tracks composed by frequent collaborater Danny Elfman.

== Release ==
Send Help premiered at the TCL Chinese Theatre on January 21, 2026, and was released in the United States on January 30, 2026, by 20th Century Studios.

=== Home media ===
Send Help was released on VOD on March 24, 2026, and on DVD, Blu-ray and Ultra HD Blu-ray on April 21, 2026.

Nielsen Media Research, which records streaming viewership on certain U.S. television screens, reported that Send Help was the third most-streamed film during the week of May 4–10, generating 427 million minutes of watch time during that period. JustWatch, a guide to streaming content with access to data from more than 45 million users around the world, announced that Send Help ranked as the most-streamed film in the United States through May 2026.

== Reception ==
=== Box office ===
Send Help grossed $65 million in the United States and Canada, and $29 million in other territories, for a worldwide total of $94 million.

In the United States and Canada, Send Help was released alongside Iron Lung, Shelter, and Melania, and was projected to gross $14–17 million from 3,475 theaters in its opening weekend. The film made $7.2 million on its first day, including $2.2 million from Thursday night previews. It went on to debut to $19.1 million, topping the box office. In its following weekend, it dropped 48%, earning $10 million. The film made $8.9 million, and $4.5 million in its third and fourth weekends.

=== Critical response ===
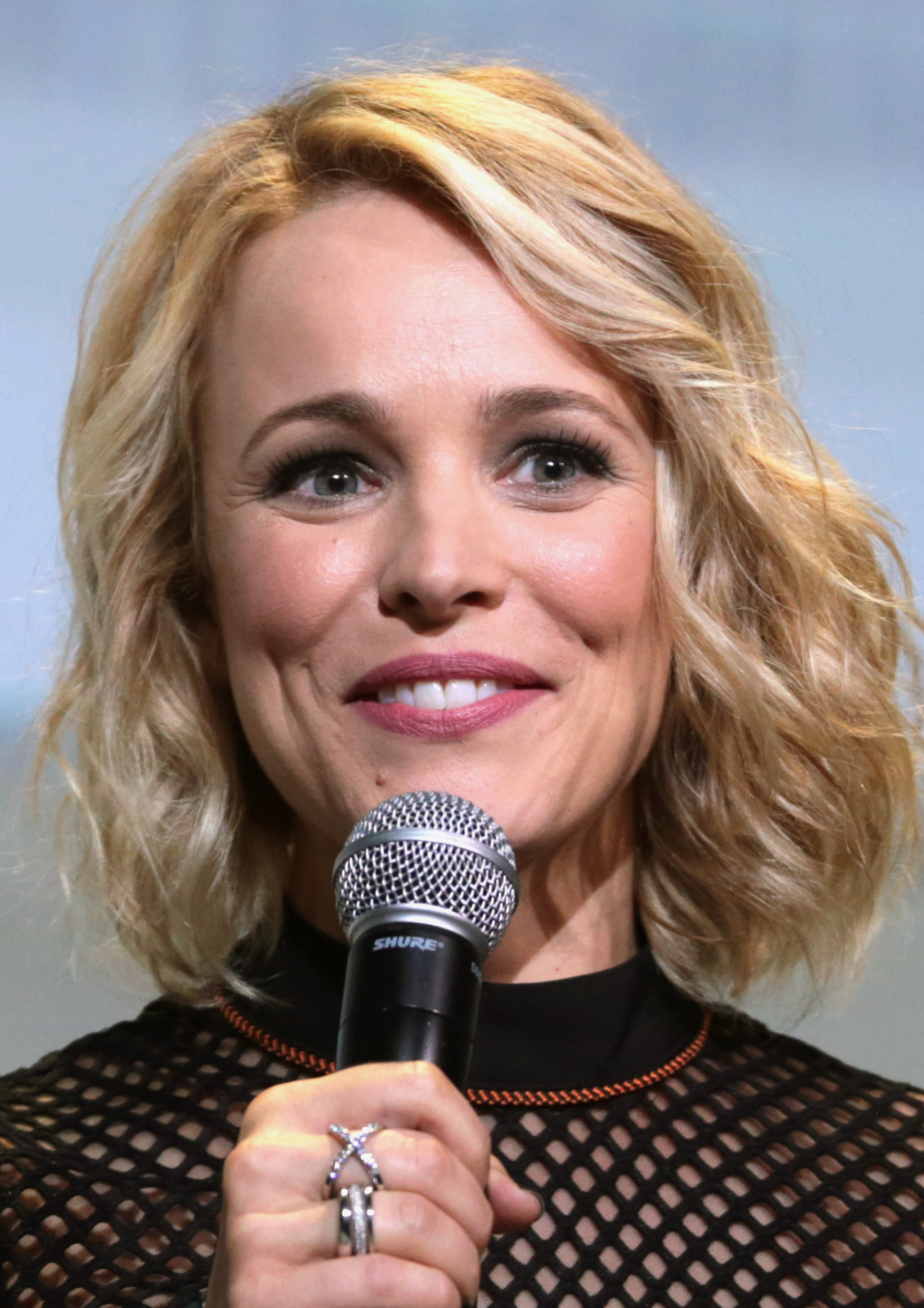
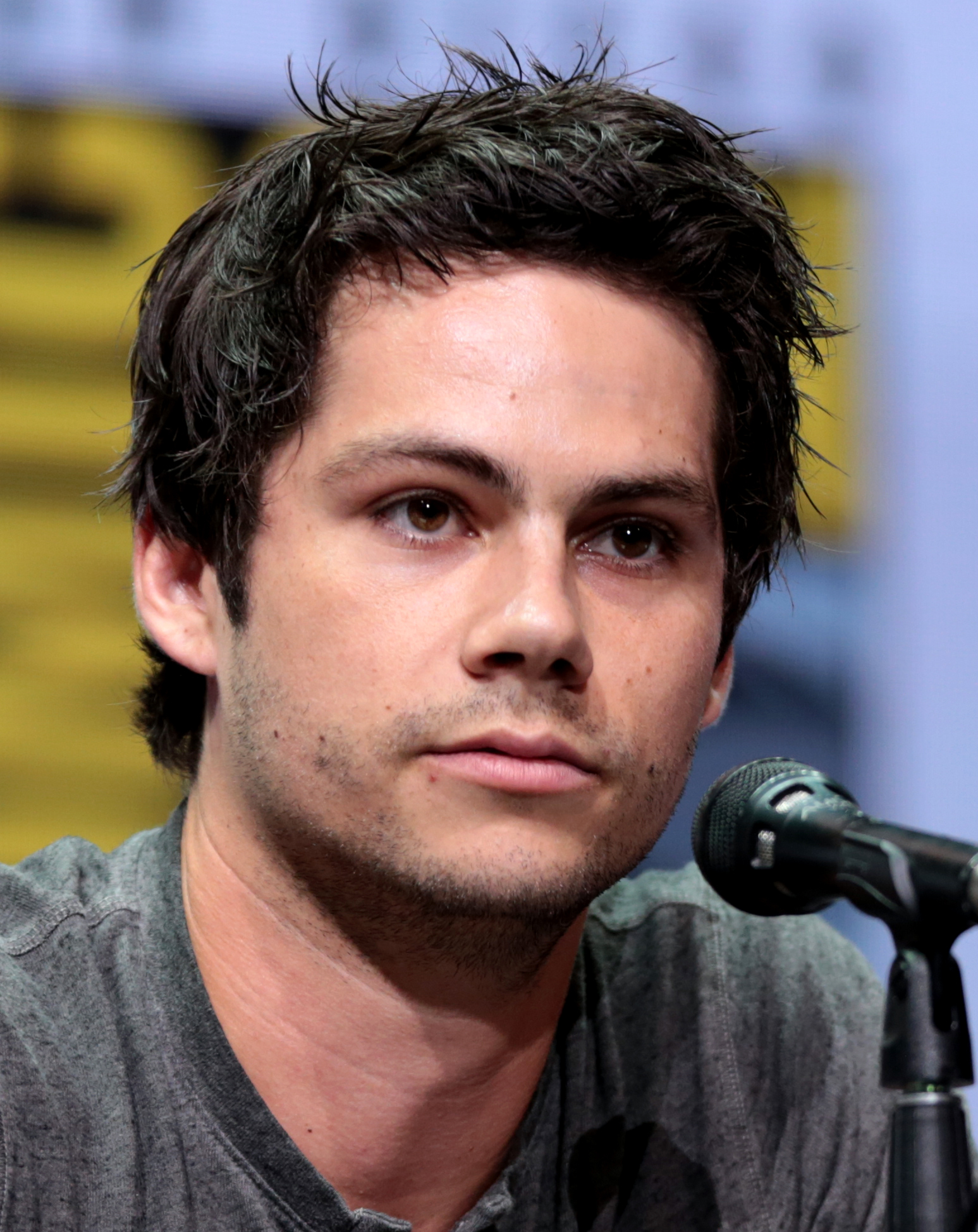
The performances of Rachel McAdams and Dylan O'Brien were highly praised by critics.

Metacritic review
breakdown (unweighted)

Positive
34 (85%)
Mixed
6 (15%)
Negative
0 (0%)

On the review aggregator website Rotten Tomatoes, 92% of 299 critics' reviews are positive, with an average rating of 7.4/10. The website's consensus reads: "Putting director Sam Raimi's penchant for diabolical mayhem to great use, Send Help doesn't need any assistance in thrills thanks to a very game Rachel McAdams and Dylan O'Brien along with a viciously clever script." Metacritic, which uses a weighted average, assigned the film a score of 75 out of 100, based on 40 critics, indicating "generally favorable" reviews. Audiences polled by CinemaScore gave the film an average grade of "B+" on an A+ to F scale.

IndieWire's Alison Foreman gave an A− for the film, and called it "wickedly lovable with the potential to be timeless". Michael Phillips of the San Francisco Chronicle wrote, "At its simplest, we have here a performance showcase for O'Brien's artfully restrained sniveling and, especially, for McAdams' miraculous shape-shifting abilities. Essentially, Send Help is Cast Away if Wilson the volleyball was a misogynist tool." Frank Scheck of The Hollywood Reporter wrote, "It could be said that Send Help indulges in more baroque plot twists than fully necessary and begins to lose some steam toward the end. But the surprising climax, plus an amusing coda, brings it all home. Audiences are in for quite a ride." Deadline Hollywood's Pete Hammond wrote, "Send Help is the first movie gem of 2026, a devilish treat and welcome respite from the real world. It's a pleasure." Jeannette Catsoulis of The New York Times wrote, "From its cheeky score by the director's frequent collaborator Danny Elfman, to its darkly humorous tone and playfully yucky special effects, the movie is Raimi at his most gleeful and twisted."

TheWrap's Amelia Emberwing wrote that the film is "a story rooted in the exploration of human nature and exactly who we become if it means survival both in the literal and figurative sense". Meagan Navarro of Bloody Disgusting wrote, "Send Help is full of vibrant personality, with all of Raimi's signatures."

=== Debate over "who to root for" ===
The film makes the audience question who exactly to root for: Linda Liddle, the bullied and under-appreciated strategist who becomes a murderer, or Bradley Preston, the abrasive and sexist boss who denies Linda's promotion that his late father promised her.

When working on the movie, director Sam Raimi claims that one of his producers advised that "the fact that [Rachel McAdams] has not really played a dark, terrible villain before really sets the audience up to be surprised". However, most critics and audiences seemed to be more sympathetic to Linda despite having Bradley's fiancée Zuri and the boat captain fall off an island cliff.

Dylan O'Brien, who plays Bradley, has said he personally would "ride for Linda". Rachel McAdams, who plays Linda, has said that the ending should make audiences uncomfortable while one of the film's producers Zainab Azizi also appears to be on Linda's side and states "Sam always loves to root for the underdog". The film's screenwriters Mark Swift and Damian Shannon refer to Linda as an anti-hero and when asked if audiences should be rooting for her, Swift replied that it is up to the audience. An alternate ending of the film sees Dennis Haysbert's character Franklin trying to blackmail Linda, which led to Slash Film asking whether the character of Linda is a "good person".

=== Accolades ===
Award	Date of ceremony	Category	Nominee(s)	Result	Ref.
Astra Midseason Movie Awards	June 30, 2026	Best Picture	Send Help	Nominated	
Astra Midseason Movie Awards	June 30, 2026	Best Actress	Rachel McAdams	Nominated	
Astra Midseason Movie Awards	June 30, 2026	Best Supporting Actor	Dylan O'Brien	Nominated	
Astra Midseason Movie Awards	June 30, 2026	Best Horror	Send Help	Nominated	
Critics' Choice Super Awards	August 6, 2026	Best Horror Movie	Send Help	Nominated	
Critics' Choice Super Awards	August 6, 2026	Best Actress in a Horror Movie	Rachel McAdams	Nominated	
Fangoria Chainsaw Awards	October 25, 2026	Best Wide Release	Send Help	Nominated	
Fangoria Chainsaw Awards	October 25, 2026	Best Lead Performance	Rachel McAdams	Nominated	
