= Untamed (TV series) =

American drama television series

- Promotional poster
- Genre: Crime drama
- Created by: Mark L. Smith; Elle Smith
- Showrunners: Mark L. Smith; Elle Smith
- Written by: Mark L. Smith; Elle Smith
- Directed by: Thomas Bezucha; Nick Murphy; Neasa Hardiman
- Starring: Eric Bana; Sam Neill; Rosemarie DeWitt; Lily Santiago; Wilson Bethel; Shea Whigham; Moon Bloodgood; Kekoa Kekumano
- Music by: Jeff Russo
- Country of origin: United States
- Original language: English
- No. of seasons: 1
- No. of episodes: 6

Production
- Executive producers: John Wells; Mark L. Smith; Elle Smith; Erin Jontow; Eric Bana; Cliff Roberts; Thomas Bezucha; Todd Black; Jason Blumenthal; Tony Shaw; Steve Tisch; Steve Lee Jones
- Producer: Kevin Human
- Cinematography: Michael McDonough; Brendan Kuroki Uegama
- Editors: Ryan Jones; Tyler Eversmann; Garret Donnelly; Debra Beth Weinfeld
- Running time: 42–51 minutes
- Production companies: Bee Holder Productions; Escape Artists; John Wells Productions; Warner Bros. Television

Original release
- Network: Netflix
- Release: July 17, 2025 – present

Untamed is an American crime drama television series for Netflix set in Yosemite National Park starring Eric Bana, Lily Santiago, Rosemarie DeWitt and Sam Neill. It was released on July 17, 2025, on Netflix. Originally pitched as a limited miniseries, it was renewed for a second season in July 2025.

== Premise ==
In the vast expanse of Yosemite National Park, a woman's death draws a federal agent into lawless terrain, where nature obeys no rules but its own.

== Cast ==
=== Main ===
- Eric Bana as Kyle Turner, a National Park Service Investigative Services Branch (ISB) special agent at Yosemite National Park who is still grieving the loss of his young son six years prior
- Sam Neill as Paul Souter, the chief park ranger of Yosemite and Turner's mentor
- Rosemarie DeWitt as Jill Bodwin, Turner's ex-wife, a realtor who used to be an elementary school teacher
- Lily Santiago as Naya Vasquez, a rookie National Park Service ranger who moved to Yosemite from Los Angeles and is assisting Turner with the investigation
- Wilson Bethel as Shane Maguire, the wildlife management officer at Yosemite and a former Army Ranger
- Shea Whigham as Ray Burkart (season 2)
- Moon Bloodgood as Layla Hale (season 2)
- Kekoa Kekumano as Marcus Sawada (season 2)

=== Recurring ===
- William Smillie as Bruce Milch, a veteran park ranger at Yosemite
- Raoul Max Trujillo as Jay Stewart, a park employee and an indigenous friend of Turner who provides insights into local symbols and heritage
- Joe Holt as Lawrence Hamilton, the park superintendent, focused on public image amid the crisis
- Josh Randall as Scott Bodwin, Jill's current husband, who is a dentist
- Ezra Franky as Lucy Cook, the victim known initially as Jane Doe, with a complex backstory involving abuse and disappearance
- Nicola Correia-Damude as Esther Avalos, a law firm investigator pressuring Turner over the disappearance of Sean Sanderson, who went missing 6 years ago
- Trevor Carroll as Mr. Begay
- Kelly Hu as Awapuhi (season 2)
- Myra Molloy as Addy Hale (season 2)
- Matthew Keoni Sato as Kaden Burkart (season 2), Ray's son
- Robbie Magasiva as Lt. Ochi (season 2), a Hawai'i Police Lieutenant
- Branscombe Richmond as Ikua Hale (season 2)
- Moronai Kanekoa as Ti Hale (season 2)
- Joe Tippett as Casper Kane (season 2)
- Luciane Buchanan as Ku'ulei Pana (season 2)

== Episodes ==
No.	Title	Directed by	Written by	Original release date	Prod. code
1	"A Celestial Event"	Thomas Bezucha	Mark L. Smith & Elle Smith	July 17, 2025	T13.25151
During a horseback ride with his son Caleb, National Park Service Investigative Services Branch (ISB) special agent Kyle Turner is called to investigate the death of a young woman, dubbed Jane Doe, whose body fell off El Capitan in Yosemite National Park but remains entangled in climbing ropes halfway down the rockface. Turner meets rangers Milch and rookie Naya Vasquez to examine the scene. The victim's injuries suggest she was chased after an attack by an animal. In addition to an X tattooed on her wrist in gold, Turner discovers bloody footprints and a beaded bracelet on the body, but it falls from Jane Doe's wrist; they leave to report back to Chief Park Ranger Paul Souter and Park Superintendent Lawrence. Turner recovers the bracelet that night and calls his ex-wife, Jill, to reminisce over their family at a meteor shower; Jill, now remarried, rebuffs him. Vasquez, a former Los Angeles cop and single mother, is partnered with Turner, and they discover carved symbols in an abandoned shack, Doe's shoes, and a bullet casing, revealing a bullet wound on Doe. Jill confronts Turner at his house over the call, and becomes worried about Turner's involvement in the case. Turner connects the bracelet to a park camp program from the past. Turner and Jill watch a meteor shower separately, revealing that their son Caleb died six years ago.
2	"Jane Doe"	Thomas Bezucha	Mark L. Smith & Elle Smith	July 17, 2025	T13.25152
Turner discovers a bottle of pills marked with the same gold X on Doe's trail, while Souter reveals a box to Vasquez full of the beaded bracelets similar to Doe's. Turner confronts Teddy, a park employee and pot dealer, over the pills, and coerces him into finding more information. Souter attempts to convince Turner to take a job at a different park. Turner is met at his house by law firm investigator Esther Avalos inquiring about one Sean Sanderson, whose disappearance five years prior was investigated by Turner immediately after Caleb's death. Turner and Vasquez travel to a plot of park inhabited by squatters to investigate the pills; Vasquez discovers a girl hiding information about Doe. Turner confronts Shane Maguire, a wildlife manager, about the potential coyote attack on Doe, before shooting Shane's rifle into a stump and recovering it to compare with the other bullet. Vasquez ignores texts from Michael, her son Gael's father, while Teddy asks a local tattoo artist about the gold Xs, which causes Teddy to be strangled later that night. At a wedding anniversary party for Souter, Milch reveals to Vasquez that Caleb was kidnapped and murdered in the park. Vasquez and Turner discover both Teddy's body and Jane Doe's identity, Lucy Cook.
3	"El-o'-win"	Nick Murphy	Mark L. Smith & Elle Smith	July 17, 2025	T13.25153
Turner and Vasquez explore Lucy's Native American heritage and previous disappearance in 2010, an investigation which Turner oversaw, revealing she ran from her abusive father, Rory, after her mother's death. Turner consults his friend Jay, a Native American, for insights into Miwok symbols she carved. Turner and Vasquez chase and question Lucy's half-brother James, which proves fruitless. Maguire's rifle is eliminated from having caused Lucy's wound. While hooking up with a hotel employee, Turner reveals suicidal urges to rejoin Caleb. Avalos confronts Jill about the Sanderson case, quietly upsetting her when Avalos mentions the death of Caleb and its potential impact on Kyle's work. Turner questions the tattoo artist who reveals that the gold X tattoo is like a branding but he only knows enough to understand that it's dangerous and to stay away. Vasquez rides alone and discovers a secret mine, but becomes trapped. Turner eventually saves her, strengthening their bond; their discovery of a respirator mask with the X branding at the mine implies a larger drug network.
4	"Gold Rush"	Nick Murphy	Mark L. Smith & Elle Smith	July 17, 2025	T13.25154
Turner and Vasquez further investigate the mine, finding the body of Abuelo, one of the squatters, outside. Turner leads a raid of the squatter camp, leading to the discovery of more pills and several arrests. At the station, DNA results reveal Rory wasn't Lucy's father, and a walk-in witness motivated by the reward claims to know Lucy from a foster home in Nevada. Vasquez investigates the girl hiding information about Lucy, and learns Lucy lived among the squatters and ran drugs, developing a romance with "Terces" ("secret" spelled backwards). Vasquez and Gael return home to find Michael, the father, who facetiously charms Gael but demands that Vasquez testify to the LAPD's IA to exonerate Michael of stealing cash. Vasquez agrees, but secretly escapes with Gael. Meanwhile, Turner confronts Maguire over the pills and Abuelo's death; Maguire retorts by mentioning that he spoke to Avalos about Sanderson. Souter pulls Turner away; he returns home to find Vasquez and Gael. Jill agrees to watch Gael while Turner and Vasquez search for the drug ring's base of operations.
5	"Terces"	Neasa Hardiman	Mark L. Smith & Elle Smith	July 17, 2025	T13.25155
Turner, Vasquez, and other federal agents find and assault the base, with three agents and several drug gang members killed. At a second base, agents find Lucy's belongings alongside three other women from the operation, dead by suicide. Captured gang members reveal no knowledge of Lucy's death, which Turner accepts. Michael arrives at Turner's house and finds Jill and Gael. A hostile confrontation escalates between Michael and Jill before Turner arrives and detains him. Jill is disturbed, not by the fight but by her jealousy of Vasquez's motherhood, leading to an attempted suicide using pills from Maguire. After visiting Jill at the hospital, Turner goes to the hotel and publicly assaults Maguire over the suicide attempt, leading to his suspension. While turning over his investigation materials to the FBI, Turner finds a phone in Lucy's belongings and travels to the morgue to unlock it. After doing so, he looks through videos and discovers a video revealing "Terces" to be Maguire. Turner travels armed to Maguire's camp to confront him. After Turner discovers more pills, Maguire shoots him with a rifle, and a chase ensues.
6	"All Trails Lead Here"	Neasa Hardiman	Mark L. Smith & Elle Smith	July 17, 2025	T13.25156
Having run out of bullets, Turner is confronted by Maguire chiding him for breaking the deal between the two of them and Jill. Before he can kill Turner, Vasquez arrives and kills Maguire; Turner passes out but is successfully hospitalized. While Turner recovers, Jill returns home and confesses to her husband that Sanderson was the man who abducted and killed Caleb six years ago, and that while Turner still wanted to pursue legal justice, Jill betrayed him and paid Maguire to blackmail and kill Sanderson. Jill and Turner embrace in the hospital, reconciling over Caleb and promising to keep themselves alive. Avalos pesters Turner again, but Turner agrees to admit he was of unsound mind during Sanderson's investigation so that her firm can sue the park for wrongful death. Despite Maguire's death and Souter's objections, Turner continues to pursue the case and travels to Nevada to investigate the foster home. The daughter of the foster mom reveals Lucy was dropped off around the time of her disappearance and that Lucy claimed her father was a cop. Turner meets Souter in the park to reveal both his findings and a reissuing of Lucy's DNA results after Turner found Souter had meddled with the initial findings. This forces Souter to admit he was Lucy's father and that when Lucy resurfaced, she demanded money from Souter and eventually abducted his granddaughter. Souter pursued Lucy with a rifle and accidentally shot her, setting in motion the events that led to her death. Turner demands Souter take responsibility, but Souter instead kills himself. Following this, Turner leaves Vasquez his horse and decides to finally part ways with the park.

== Production ==
Untamed is produced by Warner Bros. Television and studio-based John Wells Productions. It is written by Mark L. Smith and Elle Smith, who are also co-showrunners and executive producers alongside Eric Bana, who also stars, John Wells and Erin Jontow via John Wells Productions; Todd Black and Tony Shaw for Escape Artists Entertainment; Steve Lee Jones for Bee Holder Productions; and Cliff Roberts for Syndicate Entertainment. Sam Neill, Lily Santiago, Rosemarie DeWitt and Wilson Bethel joined the cast in June 2024. Filming for the series began in Vancouver, British Columbia in June 2024. Filming locations included Chip Kerr Park.

Originally pitched as a limited miniseries, on July 29, 2025, the series was renewed by Netflix for a second season. In February 2026, Shea Whigham, Moon Bloodgood, and Kekoa Kekumano joined cast in starring roles while Kelly Hu, Myra Molloy, Matthew Keoni Sato, Robbie Magasiva, Branscombe Richmond, Moronai Kanekoa, Joe Tippett, and Luciane Buchanan were cast in recurring capacities for the second season.

== Reception ==
=== Viewership ===
Untamed ranked first on Netflix's English-language TV list for the week of July 14 to 20, 2025, drawing 24.6 million views. For the second week in a row, the series was ranked first again on Netflix's English-language TV list from July 21 to 27, drawing 26.1 million views.

=== Critical response ===
The review aggregator website Rotten Tomatoes reported an 83% approval rating based on 64 critic reviews. The website's critics consensus reads, "Wrangled by Eric Bana's steady star power, Untamed's solid murder mystery is elevated by the visually sumptuous backdrop of its Yosemite National Park milieu." Metacritic, which uses a weighted average, gave a score of 62 out of 100 based on 24 critics, indicating "generally favorable".

Rebecca Onion of Slate said, "Bana and Smith know how to keep you watching, even when parts of the story start to feel familiar. In the summer, we're all tourists. A Yosemite story hits just right." Reviewing the series for The Guardian, Rebecca Nicholson gave a rating of 3/5. She described it as "not the smartest of thrillers, but those mountains sure are lovely to look at." Ben Travers of IndieWire gave a critical review with a C− and wrote, "By the end, Untamed can only offer more of the same, despite ample opportunity to provide something 'different'."
