= Yaga (TV series) =

2026 Canadian television series

- Genre: Mystery; Supernatural horror
- Created by: Kat Sandler
- Based on: Yaga by Kat Sandler
- Written by: Kat Sandler
- Directed by: David Frazee; Rachel Talalay
- Starring: Carrie-Anne Moss; Noah Reid; Clark Backo; Hudson Williams
- Composer: Trevor Yuile
- Country of origin: Canada
- Original language: English
- No. of seasons: 1
- No. of episodes: 8

Production
- Executive producers: Mackenzie Donaldson; Andrew Miller; Carrie-Anne Moss; Justin Stockman; Carolyn Newman; David Frazee; Rachel Talalay
- Producer: Charles Cooper
- Cinematography: Jaryl Lim
- Editors: D. Gillian Truster; Jason Irvine; Sydney Cowper
- Running time: 26–30 minutes
- Production companies: Front Street Pictures; Blink49 Studios

Original release
- Network: Crave
- Release: October 23, 2026 – present

Yaga is a Canadian supernatural horror mystery television series created by Kat Sandler and based on her 2019 play of the same name, inspired by the legend of Baba Yaga. Filming began in February 2026 in British Columbia, including Victoria.

The series premiered with its first two episodes on October 23, 2026 on Crave. The show has been acquired for international release by Sky in the United Kingdom and Ireland, HBO Max in the rest of Europe, AMC+ in the United States, Foxtel in Australia, and Sky New Zealand in New Zealand.

== Premise ==
In a small coastal town, Rapp, a private detective, investigates the disappearance of Henry Park, the heir to a commercial fishery. Rapp encounters Carson, a local detective, and Katherine, a university professor who has a taste for younger men, as the investigation is complicated by enigmatic suspects and ancient magic.

== Cast and characters ==
=== Main ===
- Carrie-Anne Moss as Dr. Katherine Hargrove, a university professor
- Noah Reid as Charlie Rapp, a private investigator
- Clark Backo as Sergeant Fran Carson, a local detective
- Hudson Williams in a dual role:
  - Henry Park, the heir to a commercial fishery
  - Logan Casey, Park's roommate

=== Supporting ===
- Ezra Franky as Pam Russell
- Patrick Gilmore as Eckert
- Sheila McCarthy as Olena Yaha, a local woman originally from Ukraine
- Megan Follows as Geena Sandeson
- Emilija Baranac as Angel
- Georgia Acken as Lily Sandeson
- Sam Krochmal as Billy Granger
- Katharine Isabelle
- Hiro Kanagawa
- Anisa Harris

== Episodes ==
No.	Title	Directed by	Written by	Original release date
1	"The Burning Man"	David Frazee	Kat Sandler	October 23, 2026
The episode opens with Baba Yaga narrating the myths surrounding her over a scene of a man being burned in the woods. In the coastal town of Whittock, private investigator Charlie Rapp arrives to investigate the disappearance of Henry Park, the son of a wealthy local family. Paired with Sergeant Carson, Rapp questions Henry's roommate Logan, who is almost identical to Henry, learning about Henry's recent breakup with Pam and his growing obsession with a professor he interviewed for his podcast. Rapp questions Pam, who reveals that Henry had crossed boundaries in their open relationship. While driving through the woods, Rapp and Carson accidentally hit a chicken; unable to use her gun, Carson watches as Rapp kills the injured bird by twisting its neck. The shaken pair agree to work together, and Rapp briefly hallucinates the dead chicken at his hotel. At a bar, he meets Katherine, an enigmatic woman who studies human bones and wears a watch resembling Henry's. After she leaves, Rapp hooks up with receptionist Angel, discovering that she has a triskelion tattoo similar to one in a photograph at Henry's house. Their encounter is interrupted when someone burns a rooster outside his room. Baba Yaga then narrates about the stories people tell about her, before Rapp receives a message purportedly from Henry asking him to stop searching.
2	"Dark Solstice"	David Frazee	Kat Sandler	October 23, 2026
The episode opens with Baba Yaga lamenting that people seek her magic without offering anything in return. Meanwhile, Rapp awakens from a nightmare about insects crawling over his body. When Carson arrives, she sees Angel cleaning up the damage to her hotel room door. Rapp suspects that Henry's message asking him to stop searching is fake and promises Carson greater honesty, revealing he and Henry are friends. At the local diner, the owner Geena reveals that Logan is hosting a themed party that evening and recounts how Pam punched Henry before he argued with Logan. Investigating the professor Henry had become obsessed with, Rapp discovers that she is Katherine. He confronts her about Henry's disappearance, but she redirects his suspicions towards Pam and Logan. After Henry's phone is located near his house, Rapp and Carson infiltrate Logan's party in disguise. Rapp accepts a laced lollipop from Angel and begins hallucinating, while Carson follows a man she believes to be Henry and discovers that he is actually Logan. Rapp sees a chicken feather before hallucinating Katherine in a white dress in the woods, where she invites him to make a wish. He then sees a burning bird as Carson calls out to him. The partygoers subsequently discover Logan's dead body on the beach, while Baba Yaga narrates about wondering why nasty stories are told about her.
3	"A Good Boy"	David Frazee	Kat Sandler	October 30, 2026
The episode opens with Baba Yaga narrating how a witch is made, recalling a man who came to her wanting something other than what she offered. Meanwhile, a disoriented Rapp mistakes Logan's body for Henry's after the party. The evidence suggests he was killed in his bedroom before being thrown from the window and dragged to the water. Rapp, still recovering from the party, receives a call from Henry's mother, Dora, while Carson reminds him that the two investigations may be connected. During Logan's autopsy, the detectives learn that he was emasculated before being stabbed and that an obsidian bone dagger with ancient carvings was used in the attack. Katherine identifies the knife as Aztec, and tells Rapp that she had discussed Baba Yaga with Henry during their missing podcast interview. She explains the witch's association with eating the bones of bad humans. Carson subsequently questions Logan's mother, Alice, who reveals that Logan and Pam had bought a hen for a sacrifice from Geena. After Rapp experiences further hallucinations, the detectives search the Park house and discover drugs marked with a triskelion symbol and a hidden room containing recordings of Logan impersonating Henry. One recording reveals that the girl with whom Logan had sex at the party was Pam. They also find a concealed microphone and a triskelion surrounded by chicken feathers beneath Henry's bed.
4	"Dance With The Devil"	David Frazee	Kat Sandler	November 6, 2026
5	"The Horns"	Rachel Talalay	Kat Sandler	November 13, 2026
6	"Mother Witch"	Rachel Talalay	Kat Sandler	November 20, 2026

== Production ==
=== Development ===
Kat Sandler's original play, a reimagining of the Slavic folk tale of Baba Yaga, premiered at the Tarragon Theatre in Toronto in 2019. She began developing Yaga for television with her collaborative partner, Mackenzie Donaldson, who described the story as a "crazy fairy tale dressed up like a detective series, a True Detective or Broadchurch". They pitched the concept to Bell Media to fit the company's call for a twisty drama series with half-hour episodes for their Crave streaming service. Bell Media accepted their proposal in October 2023 and announced Yaga at their Upfronts in June 2025.

The eight-episode series was produced by Front Street Pictures, based in British Columbia where it was filmed, and Blink49 Studios, where Donaldson had become Vice President of Scripted Television. Donaldson was an executive producer on Yaga, along with Andrew Miller and lead actress Carrie-Anne Moss; Charles Cooper was the producer.

=== Casting ===
The principal cast was revealed on February 18, 2026, while the show was filming. Carrie-Anne Moss plays Katherine, a university professor with a taste for younger men. Moss said she was drawn to the project by Sandler's creative take on the tale of Baba Yaga. Noah Reid—who participated in workshops of the original play—was cast as Rapp, a private investigator looking into a young man's disappearance. Clark Backo plays Carson, a local detective; she described the series as "a mystery thriller that takes a look at what kind of power it might take to overcome those who think they're untouchable". The missing person, Henry Park, is played by Hudson Williams, who had recently starred in another Crave Original series, Heated Rivalry. After the announcement that Williams had been cast in the adaptation, it was reported that print copies of the play had sold out.

Additional cast members were announced on April 23, including Sheila McCarthy, Megan Follows, Ezra Franky, Patrick Gilmore, Katharine Isabelle, Hiro Kanagawa, Emilija Baranac, Georgia Acken, Anisa Harris, and Sam Krochmal.

=== Filming ===
The show, which is set in a small coastal town, was shot in Victoria, British Columbia, located on Vancouver Island off the west coast of Canada. Principal photography took place in February and March 2026. The series was directed by David Frazee and Rachel Talalay. Sandler was the showrunner on the production.

== Release ==
Yaga will premiere on October 23, 2026 on Crave in Canada, and on AMC+ in the United States. The series consists of eight 30-minute episodes. An option of four 60-minute episodes was made available to international buyers. International sales were secured by Bell Media's distributor, Sphere Abacus. The series was picked up by Sky in the United Kingdom and Ireland, HBO Max in the rest of Europe, Foxtel in Australia, and Sky New Zealand in New Zealand. In the United States, AMC+ won a competitive bid for the streaming rights to add to their slate of witchcraft programming, such as Sanctuary: A Witch's Tale. The series received a preview screening in the Primetime program at the 2026 Toronto International Film Festival.

== Reception ==
On the review aggregator website Rotten Tomatoes, 75% of 32 critics' reviews are positive, with an average rating of 6.5/10. The website's consensus reads: "In Yaga, the small-town gossip is juicy, the desires are questionable, and the woods are looking awfully witchy in this darkly comic supernatural mystery." Metacritic, which uses a weighted average, assigned the film a score of 64 out of 100, based on 15 critics, indicating "generally favorable" reviews.
