= Lucy Barrett =

Australian actress

- Born: Geelong, Australia
- Occupation: Actress
- Years active: 2014–present

Lucy Barrett is an Australian actress. On television, she is known for her roles in the soap opera Neighbours (2014–2016), the Stan series Bloom (2020) and the CW series Charmed (2022). Her films include Emo the Musical (2016), Sissy (2022) and Deep Water (2026).

== Early life ==
Barrett was born in Geelong near Melbourne. She is of Irish and American descent. She came out as a lesbian to her family at the age of 13. She graduated from Apo Art Academy, a drama school in Melbourne.

== Career ==
Barrett made her acting debut on the soap opera Neighbours where she portrayed Hayley Hahn. She had a recurring role as Vita in the web series Co-Ed. Her first big role came playing Mikaela in the fantasy drama series Charmed. She made a minor appearance in the action thriller film Black Site playing Mia Davis before playing Fran, one of the main characters of the psychological indie film Sissy starring Aisha Dee. She played Penny in the survival film Deep Water. She is currently as of 2026 starring as Sammy Bishop in the action drama series S.W.A.T. Exiles.

== Filmography ==
=== Film ===
| Year | Title | Role | Notes |
|---|---|---|---|
| 2016 | Emo the Musical | Roz | |
| 2018 | Bestia | Alicia | Short |
| 2019 | Swipe | Asha | Short |
| 2021 | Someone Else | Karen | Short |
| 2022 | Sissy | Fran | |
| 2022 | Black Site | Mia Davis | |
| 2023 | Sinister Assistant | Gigi | |
| 2024 | Skincare | Mandy | |
| 2024 | Strange Creatures | Sophie Goddard | |
| 2026 | Deep Water | Penny | |
| 2026 | Heirloom | Sonia | |
| 2026 | Zombie Plane | | |
| TBA | Wrong Number † | | In production |

=== Television ===
| Year | Title | Role | Notes |
|---|---|---|---|
| 2016 | Double Date Night | Lani | Episode; #1.4 |
| 2016 | The Wrong Girl | Cassandra | Episode; #1.2 |
| 2014–2016 | Neighbours | Hayley Hahn | 7 episodes |
| 2017 | Seven Types of Ambiguity | Girl Dancing | Episode: "Alex" |
| 2017 | Utopia | Accountant #3 | Episode: "Blue Sky Thinking" |
| 2017 | Offspring | Waitress | Episode #7.6 |
| 2020 | Bloom | Isabella Webb | 6 episodes |
| 2020 | Halifax: Retribution | Kylie | Episode #1.2 |
| 2022 | Charmed | Mikaela | 13 episodes |
| 2026 | S.W.A.T. Exiles | Sammy Bishop | |

=== Web ===
| Year | Title | Role | Notes |
|---|---|---|---|
| 2017 | The Y2K Bug | Janice | Episode: "Having a Good Time Together" |
| 2018 | Co-Ed | Vita | 5 episodes |
| 2025–2026 | Girl Dinner | Salem | 3 episodes |
