= SCIFI.radio =

American Internet radio station

SCIFI.radio logo

SCIFI.radio, formerly known as Krypton Radio, is an American Internet radio station focused on science fiction and geek culture. Its continual broadcast includes music from movies, television, and games; discussions; radio series (including The Shadow, The Adventures of Superman, and X Minus 1); and science-fiction themed talk shows. Its website also features columns and articles on science fiction, science, and geek culture. It is heard in well over 100 countries.

Susan Fox and Gene Turnbow had wanted, but didn't find, a science-fiction oriented radio station to listen to while doing online gaming. So Turnbow, with assistance from Fox, started Krypton Radio in 2009. In 2011, the station that began as a hobby became a business, and in 2013 the station incorporated. The business became self-sustaining in 2015.

The station changed its name to SCIFI.radio in 2021. Fox serves as executive producer, and the station's founder Turnbow serves as station manager. The station is owned by Krypton Media Group, Inc., a privately held California Chapter S corporation, for which Fox and Turnbow are founders and board members. Fox and Turnbow were selected as guests of honor for the 2022 Loscon 48 science fiction and fantasy convention held by the Los Angeles Science Fantasy Society in Los Angeles.
