= 2025–26 United States network television schedule =

Television schedule for the fall of 2025

The 2025–26 network television schedule for the five major English-language commercial broadcast networks that air in the United States covers the prime time hours from September 2025 to August 2026. The schedule is followed by a list per network of returning series, new series, and series canceled after the 2024–25 television season.

CBS was the first to announce its initial fall schedule on May 7, 2025 via press release (without an upfront presentation), followed by NBC (with its upfront presentation at 10:30 a.m. Eastern time) on May 12, Fox (with its upfront presentation at 4 p.m.) also on May 12, and ABC on May 13 (with its upfront presentation at 4 p.m. that day).

The CW did not announce a schedule for fall 2025 but did announce its summer 2026 schedule, along with premiere dates on April 16, 2026.

The 2025–26 season marked the final time that the Crimetime Saturday block aired on CBS. Beginning with the 2026–27 season, Crimetime Saturday was permanently rebranded to CBS Encores.

PBS is not included, as member television stations have local flexibility over most of their schedule and broadcast times for network shows may vary.

Each of the 30 highest-rated shows released in June 2026 is listed with its rank and rating as determined by Nielsen Media Research.

New series to broadcast television are highlighted in bold.

Repeat airings or same-day rebroadcasts are indicated by (R).

All times are U.S. Eastern and Pacific Time (except for some live sports or events). Subtract one hour for Central, Mountain, Alaska, and Hawaii–Aleutian times.

All sporting events air live in all time zones in U.S. Eastern time (unless otherwise noted), with local and/or late night programming scheduled by affiliates after game completion.

During the NFL regular season and Wild Card Round (excluding games on broadcast networks, with ABC and/or Hearst affiliates having first refusal on games broadcast by ESPN (due to ABC being owned by the same company as ESPN, and Hearst owning 20% stake on ESPN), therefore its primetime programming from its respective network may be delayed or moved to another sister station to air live), the NFL policy on Monday Night Football games on ESPN, Thursday Night Football, NFL Network Exclusive Game Series and any game exclusively airing on Peacock, Netflix, YouTube and ESPN+/ESPN Flagship will affect the 31 primary markets (30 markets with NFL teams and Milwaukee, WI). The NFL sells syndication rights to the cable and streaming-only games to local broadcasters in the home and away teams' primary markets to maximize ratings.

During the NFL preseason, NBA, MLB and NHL preseason and regular season (plus first round NHL postseason games), some affiliates may not air their respective primetime programming due to their local NFL, NBA, MLB or NHL team games and may choose to put its network's programming on a sister channel to air live, delay the program to air later on the network or preempt the shows entirely.

== Legend ==
- Light blue indicates local programming.
- Gray indicates encore programming.
- Blue-gray indicates news programming.
- Light green indicates sporting events.
- Red indicates series being burned off and other irregularly scheduled programs, including specials and movies.
- Light gold indicates programming produced outside of the United States.
- Bronze indicates reruns of programming that originally aired on a cable channel or streaming service.
- Light yellow indicates the current schedule.
- highlight Yellow highlights indicates the top-10 most watched programs of the season.
- highlight Cyan highlights indicates numbers 11-20 most watched programs of the season.
- highlight Magenta highlights indicates numbers 21-30 most watched programs of the season.
- highlight Highlights indicates that it falls in multiple of the above categories.

== Sunday ==
Network		7:00 p.m.	7:30 p.m.	8:00 p.m.	8:30 p.m.	9:00 p.m.	9:30 p.m.	10:00 p.m.	10:30 p.m.
ABC	Fall	America's Funniest Home Videos		The Wonderful World of Disney (Note: On select weeks when episodes of America's Funniest Home Videos: So Many Laughs, So Little Time or hour-long ABC encores air at 8 p.m., The Wonderful World of Disney will air at 8:30 p.m. or 9 p.m., depending on the gap between new AFV and the movie.) (Note: On select weeks when America's Funniest Home Videos cannot air new episodes at 7 p.m., The Wonderful World of Disney may be shifted to 7:30 p.m. with other ABC encores filling in the 7 p.m. ET/PT half hour.)					
ABC	Winter	America's Funniest Home Videos (R)				American Idol (R)			
ABC	Spring	America's Funniest Home Videos		America's Funniest Home Videos (R)		Celebrity Jeopardy! (R)		**Betrayal: Secrets & Lies**	
ABC	Late spring	America's Funniest Home Videos		The Wonderful World of Disney					
CBS	Fall	NFL on CBS (4:25 p.m.)	60 Minutes (3/14.6)		Tracker (5/10.7)		**The Road**		Various programming
CBS	Winter	60 Minutes (3/14.6)		**Marshals** (6/9.9)		Tracker (5/10.7)		Watson	
CBS	Spring	60 Minutes (3/14.6)		**Marshals** (6/9.9)		Tracker (5/10.7)		**Marshals** (R)	
CBS	Summer	60 Minutes (3/14.6)		Big Brother		Tracker (5/10.7)		**Marshals** (R)	
The CW	Fall	Trivial Pursuit (R)		The CW Sunday Night Movie (Note: On select weeks, The CW Sunday Night Movie airs 2.5 hours of movies at 7:30 p.m., thus the repeat airing in the 7 p.m. hour will only air for a half hour.) (Note: On select weeks, The CW Sunday Night Movie airs 3 hours of movies at 7 p.m., thus no other programming will air in the 7 p.m. hour.)				Local programming	
The CW	Winter	Penn & Teller: Fool Us (R)		The CW Sunday Night Movie				Local programming	
The CW	Spring	Police 24/7 (R)		The CW Sunday Night Movie				Local programming	
The CW	Late spring	Penn & Teller: Fool Us (R)		The CW Sunday Night Movie				Local programming	
The CW	Summer	Police 24/7 (R)		The CW Sunday Night Movie				Local programming	
Fox	Fall	Fox NFL (4:25 p.m.)	The OT (4/11.5)	The Simpsons	Universal Basic Guys	Krapopolis	Bob's Burgers	Local programming	
Fox	Winter	Next Level Chef (R)		Family Guy	Universal Basic Guys	American Dad!	Family Guy	Local programming	
Fox	Spring	Next Level Chef (R)		**The Faithful: Women of the Bible**				Local programming	
Fox	Mid-spring	Next Level Chef (R)		Family Guy	Bob's Burgers	American Dad!	Various programming	Local programming	
Fox	Summer	Kitchen Nightmares (R)		The Simpsons (R)	Animal Control (R)	Universal Basic Guys (R)	Grimsburg (R)	Local programming	
NBC	Fall	Football Night in America (2/17.3)		NBC Sunday Night Football (8:20 p.m.) (1/20.7)					
NBC	Winter	Basketball Night in America		NBC Sunday Night Basketball					NBA Showtime
NBC	Spring	NBC Sunday Night Baseball (7:20 p.m.)						Password (R)	

== Monday ==
Network		8:00 p.m.	8:30 p.m.	9:00 p.m.	9:30 p.m.	10:00 p.m.	10:30 p.m.
ABC	Fall	Monday Night Countdown (7:30 p.m.)	Monday Night Football (8:15 p.m.) (4/11.4)				
ABC	Winter	American Idol (19/6.2)				The Rookie (30/5.25)	
ABC	Summer	**Dancing with the Stars: The Next Pro**		Who Wants to Be a Millionaire (R)		Celebrity Family Feud (R)	
CBS	Fall	The Neighborhood	**DMV**	FBI (16/6.5)		Watson	
CBS	Winter	The Neighborhood	**DMV**	FBI (16/6.5)		NCIS: Origins (R)	
CBS	Late winter	The Neighborhood	**DMV**	FBI (16/6.5)		**CIA**	
CBS	Spring	The Neighborhood (R)		FBI (16/6.5)		**CIA**	
CBS	Summer	FBI (R)		**CIA** (R)		FBI (R)	
The CW	Fall	**TV We Love**		Scrabble (R)		Local programming	
The CW	Mid-fall	Penn & Teller: Fool Us (R)		**TV We Love**		Local programming	
The CW	Winter	Penn & Teller: Fool Us (R)				Local programming	
The CW	Mid-winter	Wild Cards		Sullivan's Crossing (R)		Local programming	
The CW	Late winter	Wild Cards		Penn & Teller: Fool Us (R)		Local programming	
The CW	Spring	Sullivan's Crossing		Wild Cards (R)		Local programming	
The CW	Late spring	Sullivan's Crossing		Penn & Teller: Fool Us (R)		Local programming	
The CW	Summer	All American		Penn & Teller: Fool Us (R)		Local programming	
Fox	Fall	Celebrity Name That Tune		**Celebrity Weakest Link**		Local programming	
Fox	Winter	Extracted		**Memory of a Killer**		Local programming	
Fox	Spring	The 1% Club		The Quiz with Balls		Local programming	
Fox	Summer	Beat Shazam				Local programming	
NBC	Fall	The Voice				Brilliant Minds	
NBC	Mid-fall	St. Denis Medical	**The Paper** (R)	The Voice		Brilliant Minds	
NBC	Winter	St. Denis Medical	**Stumble** (R)	The Wall		Brilliant Minds	
NBC	Late winter	St. Denis Medical	**The Fall and Rise of Reggie Dinkins**	The Voice			
NBC	Spring	NBA Monday					NBA Showtime
NBC	Late spring	St. Denis Medical (R)	Various programming	American Ninja Warrior			
NBC	Summer	American Ninja Warrior				The Wall	

== Tuesday ==
Network		8:00 p.m.	8:30 p.m.	9:00 p.m.	9:30 p.m.	10:00 p.m.	10:30 p.m.
ABC	Fall	Dancing with the Stars (9/7.5)				High Potential (7/8.0)	
ABC	Winter	Will Trent (15/6.8)		High Potential (7/8.0)		The Rookie (30/5.25)	
ABC	Late winter	Will Trent (15/6.8)		High Potential (7/8.0)		**R.J. Decker**	
ABC	Spring	Will Trent (15/6.8)		**R.J. Decker**		High Potential (R)	
ABC	Late spring	ESPN on ABC sports programming					
ABC	Summer	**R.J. Decker** (R)		Will Trent (R)			
ABC	Late summer	Jeopardy! Masters		Various programming			
CBS	Fall	NCIS (10/7.2)		NCIS: Origins (29/5.30)		NCIS: Sydney	
CBS	Winter	**Harlan Coben's Final Twist**		NCIS (R)		NCIS: Origins (R)	
CBS	Late winter	NCIS (10/7.2)		NCIS: Origins (29/5.30)		NCIS: Sydney	
CBS	Summer	NCIS (10/7.2)		NCIS: Origins (R)			
The CW		WWE NXT				Local programming	
Fox	Fall	Murder in a Small Town		Doc		Local programming	
Fox	Winter	**Best Medicine**		Doc		Local programming	
Fox	Spring	Farmer Wants a Wife		Bear Grylls Is Running Wild		Local programming	
Fox	Summer	Kitchen Nightmares		Beat Shazam		Local programming	
NBC	Fall	The Voice (25/5.4)				**On Brand with Jimmy Fallon**	
NBC	Mid-fall	Coast 2 Coast Tuesday					NBA Showtime
NBC	Spring	America's Got Talent				Password	

== Wednesday ==
Network		8:00 p.m.	8:30 p.m.	9:00 p.m.	9:30 p.m.	10:00 p.m.	10:30 p.m.
ABC	Fall	Shifting Gears (26/5.39)	Abbott Elementary	The Golden Bachelor		Shark Tank	
ABC	Winter	Shifting Gears (26/5.39)	Abbott Elementary	**Dirty Talk: When Daytime Talk Shows Ruled TV**		Shark Tank	
ABC	Late winter	Scrubs	Abbott Elementary	**The Greatest Average American**		Shark Tank	
ABC	Spring	Celebrity Wheel of Fortune (R)		Shark Tank (R)			
ABC	Late spring	Celebrity Wheel of Fortune (R)		Shifting Gears (R)			
ABC	Summer	Who Wants to Be a Millionaire		Shifting Gears (R)			
ABC	Late summer	Who Wants to Be a Millionaire		Shark Tank (R)			
CBS	Fall	Survivor (20/6.15)			The Amazing Race		
CBS	Winter	Hollywood Squares		The Price Is Right at Night		**Harlan Coben's Final Twist** (R)	
CBS	Late winter	Survivor (20/6.15)			**America's Culinary Cup**		Hollywood Squares
CBS	Spring	**Harlan Coben's Final Twist** (R)		**Boston Blue** (R)		FBI (R)	
CBS	Late spring	**Harlan Coben's Final Twist** (R)		NCIS (R)		NCIS: Sydney (R)	
CBS	Summer	Big Brother			Survivor (R)		
The CW	Fall	**Law & Order Toronto: Criminal Intent**		Wild Cards (R)		Local programming	
The CW	Winter	Police 24/7		Police 24/7 (R)		Local programming	
The CW	Spring	Police 24/7		**Law & Order Toronto: Criminal Intent** (R)		Local programming	
The CW	Summer	Police 24/7 (R)				Local programming	
Fox	Fall	The Floor		**99 to Beat**		Local programming	
Fox	Winter	The Masked Singer		**Fear Factor: House of Fear**		Local programming	
Fox	Spring	MasterChef		The Floor		Local programming	
Fox	Summer	MasterChef		**Nation's Dumbest**		Local programming	
NBC	Fall	Chicago Med (12/7.10)		Chicago Fire (11/7.19)		Chicago P.D. (18/6.3)	
NBC	Winter	Chicago Med (12/7.10)		Chicago Fire (11/7.19)		Chicago P.D. (18/6.3)	
NBC	Spring	Chicago Med (12/7.10)		Chicago Fire (11/7.19)		Chicago P.D. (18/6.3)	
NBC	Summer	Brilliant Minds		Chicago Fire (11/7.19)		Chicago P.D. (18/6.3)	
NBC	Mid-summer	Chicago Med (R)		Chicago Fire (11/7.19)		Chicago P.D. (18/6.3)	
NBC	Late summer	America's Got Talent		Chicago Fire (11/7.19)		Chicago P.D. (18/6.3)	

== Thursday ==
Network		8:00 p.m.	8:30 p.m.	9:00 p.m.	9:30 p.m.	10:00 p.m.	10:30 p.m.
ABC	Fall	9-1-1 (24/5.5)		**9-1-1: Nashville**		Grey's Anatomy	
ABC	Late fall	Various programming		The Great Christmas Light Fight			
ABC	Winter	9-1-1 (24/5.5)		**9-1-1: Nashville**		Grey's Anatomy	
ABC	Spring	9-1-1 (24/5.5)		**9-1-1: Nashville** (R)			
ABC	Summer	Celebrity Family Feud		Press Your Luck		**The Greatest Average American** (R)	
ABC	Late summer	9-1-1 (R)		**9-1-1: Nashville** (R)			
CBS	Fall	Georgie & Mandy's First Marriage (14/6.81)	Ghosts (21/6.14)	Matlock (13/7.0)		Elsbeth (23/6.0)	
CBS	Spring	Georgie & Mandy's First Marriage (14/6.81)	Ghosts (21/6.14)	Elsbeth (23/6.0)		Elsbeth (R)	
CBS	Late spring	Georgie & Mandy's First Marriage (14/6.81)	Ghosts (21/6.14)	Matlock (R)		Elsbeth (R)	
CBS	Summer	Big Brother		Georgie & Mandy's First Marriage (R)	Ghosts (R)	Georgie & Mandy's First Marriage (R)	Ghosts (R)
CBS	Late summer	Big Brother		Georgie & Mandy's First Marriage (R)	Ghosts (R)	Elsbeth (R)	
The CW	Fall	Police 24/7		Police 24/7 (R)		Local programming	
The CW	Winter	Trivial Pursuit (R)				Local programming	
The CW	Mid-winter	Scrabble		Trivial Pursuit		Local programming	
The CW	Summer	Trivial Pursuit (R)		Scrabble (R)		Local programming	
Fox	Fall	Hell's Kitchen		Special Forces: World's Toughest Test		Local programming	
Fox	Late fall	Hell's Kitchen		**Next Level Baker**		Local programming	
Fox	Winter	Next Level Chef		Animal Control	Going Dutch	Local programming	
Fox	Spring	Fox Presents				Local programming	
Fox	Late spring	Soccer on Fox					
Fox	Summer	The 1% Club (R)		Best Medicine (R)		Local programming	
NBC	Fall	Law & Order		Law & Order: Special Victims Unit (27/5.34)		Law & Order: Organized Crime (R)	
NBC	Winter	Law & Order		Law & Order: Special Victims Unit (27/5.34)		The Hunting Party	
NBC	Spring	**Surviving Earth**		The Americas (R)		Law & Order: Special Victims Unit (R)	
NBC	Summer	Law & Order (R)		Law & Order: Special Victims Unit (R)		Law & Order (R)	

== Friday ==
Network		8:00 p.m.	8:30 p.m.	9:00 p.m.	9:30 p.m.	10:00 p.m.	10:30 p.m.
ABC	Fall	Celebrity Wheel of Fortune		20/20			
ABC	Late fall	College Football on ABC					
ABC	Winter	Celebrity Wheel of Fortune		20/20			
ABC	Late winter	Celebrity Jeopardy!		20/20			
CBS	Fall	**Sheriff Country** (17/6.4)		Fire Country (28/5.31)		**Boston Blue** (22/6.10)	
CBS	Summer	Big Brother: Unlocked		**Sheriff Country** (R)		**Boston Blue** (22/6.10)	
The CW	Fall	Penn & Teller: Fool Us		Masters of Illusion		Local programming	
The CW	Spring	Penn & Teller: Fool Us		The American Bible Challenge (R)		Local programming	
The CW	Late spring	Penn & Teller: Fool Us		Totally Funny Animals		Local programming	
Fox	Fall	Fox College Football Friday					
Fox	Winter	Fox College Basketball Friday				Local programming	
Fox	Spring	Fox UFL Friday					
Fox	Late spring	Soccer on Fox					
Fox	Summer	MasterChef (R)		**Nation's Dumbest** (R)		Local programming	
NBC	Fall	**On Brand with Jimmy Fallon**		Dateline NBC			
NBC	Mid-fall	Happy's Place	**Stumble**	Dateline NBC			
NBC	Spring	Happy's Place	Happy's Place (R)	Dateline NBC			
NBC	Late spring	America's Got Talent (R)				Dateline NBC	

== Saturday ==
Network		8:00 p.m.	8:30 p.m.	9:00 p.m.	9:30 p.m.	10:00 p.m.	10:30 p.m.
ABC	Fall	Saturday Night Football (7:30 p.m.) (8/7.9)					
ABC	Winter	NBA Tip-Off	NBA Saturday Primetime				
ABC	Spring	ABC Hockey Saturday					
ABC	Mid-spring	ESPN on ABC sports programming					
CBS	Fall	Crimetime Saturday				48 Hours	
CBS	Spring	WNBA on CBS				48 Hours	
CBS	Summer	**Harlan Coben's Final Twist** (R)		48 Hours (R)			
The CW	Fall	CW Sports programming				Local programming	
The CW	Late fall	The CW Saturday Night Movie				Local programming	
The CW	Winter	**TV We Love** (R)				Local programming	
The CW	Mid-winter	I Am (R)				Local programming	
The CW	Spring	CW Sports programming				Local programming	
The CW	Summer	I Am (R)				Local programming	
The CW	Mid-summer	CW Sports programming				Local programming	
Fox	Fall	Fox College Football (continued to game completion)					
Fox	Winter	Fox Primetime Hoops				Local programming	
Fox	Late winter	Fox Sports programming					
Fox	Spring	Baseball Night in America (7:00 p.m.)				Local programming	
NBC	Fall	College Football on NBC (Note: Branded as Big Ten Saturday Night or Notre Dame Football on NBC depending on conference game being broadcast.) (7:30 p.m.)					
NBC	Late fall	The Wall (R)		Dateline Weekend Mystery (R)		Saturday Night Live (R)	
NBC	Winter	NBC Sports programming					
NBC	Spring	The Wall (R)		Dateline Weekend Mystery (R)		Saturday Night Live (R)	
NBC	Late spring	American Ninja Warrior (R)				Dateline Weekend Mystery (R)	

== By network ==
=== ABC ===
Returning series:

- 20/20
- 9-1-1
- Abbott Elementary
- ABC Hockey Saturday
- American Idol
- America's Funniest Home Videos
- Celebrity Family Feud
- Celebrity Jeopardy!
- Celebrity Wheel of Fortune
- Dancing with the Stars
- The Golden Bachelor
- The Great Christmas Light Fight
- Grey's Anatomy
- High Potential
- Jeopardy! Masters
- Monday Night Countdown
- Monday Night Football
- NBA Countdown
- NBA Saturday Primetime
- Press Your Luck
- The Rookie
- Saturday Night Football
- Scrubs (Note: Series revival; previously aired on NBC from 2001 to 2008, and ABC from 2009 to 2010.)
- Shark Tank
- Shifting Gears
- Who Wants to Be a Millionaire
- Will Trent

New series:

- **9-1-1: Nashville**
- **Betrayal: Secrets & Lies**
- **Dancing with the Stars: The Next Pro**
- **Dirty Talk: When Daytime Talk Shows Ruled TV**
- **The Greatest Average American**
- **R.J. Decker**

Not returning from 2024–25:

- The Bachelor (delayed to 2026–27)
- The Conners
- Doctor Odyssey
- Scamanda
- What Would You Do? (delayed to 2026–27)

=== CBS ===
Returning series:

- 48 Hours
- 60 Minutes
- The Amazing Race
- Big Brother
- Big Brother: Unlocked
- Elsbeth
- FBI
- Fire Country
- Georgie & Mandy's First Marriage
- Ghosts
- Hollywood Squares
- Matlock
- NCIS
- NCIS: Origins
- NCIS: Sydney
- The Neighborhood
- NFL on CBS
- Survivor
- Tracker
- Watson

New series:

- **America's Culinary Cup**
- **Boston Blue**
- **CIA**
- **DMV**
- **Harlan Coben's Final Twist**
- **Marshals**
- **The Road**
- **Sheriff Country**

Not returning from 2024–25:

- Blue Bloods
- The Equalizer
- FBI: International
- FBI: Most Wanted
- Poppa's House
- The Summit
- S.W.A.T.

=== The CW ===
Returning series:

- All American
- The American Bible Challenge (reruns) (Note: A Game Show Network original series; airs repeats.)
- CW Football Saturday
- Masters of Illusion
- Penn & Teller: Fool Us
- Police 24/7
- Scrabble
- Sullivan's Crossing
- Totally Funny Animals
- Trivial Pursuit
- Wild Cards
- WWE NXT

New series:

- **Law & Order Toronto: Criminal Intent**
- **TV We Love**

Not returning from 2024–25:

- Children Ruin Everything
- Good Cop/Bad Cop
- Inside the NFL
- Joan
- Superman & Lois
- The Wranglers

=== Fox ===
Returning series:

- The 1% Club
- American Dad! (Note: Returned from TBS; previously aired on Fox from 2005 to 2014.)
- Animal Control
- Baseball Night in America
- Bear Grylls Is Running Wild (moved from National Geographic)
- Beat Shazam
- Bob's Burgers
- Doc
- Extracted
- Family Guy
- Farmer Wants a Wife
- The Floor
- Fox College Football
- Fox College Hoops
- Going Dutch
- Hell's Kitchen
- Kitchen Nightmares
- Krapopolis
- Lego Masters
- The Masked Singer
- MasterChef
- Murder in a Small Town
- Name That Tune
- Next Level Chef
- NFL on Fox
- The OT
- The Quiz with Balls
- The Simpsons
- Special Forces: World's Toughest Test
- UFL on Fox
- Universal Basic Guys
- Weakest Link (moved from NBC)

New series:

- **99 to Beat**
- **Best Medicine**
- **The Faithful: Women of the Bible**
- **Fear Factor: House of Fear**
- **Memory of a Killer**
- **Nation's Dumbest**
- **Next Level Baker**

Not returning from 2024–25:

- 9-1-1: Lone Star
- Accused
- Alert: Missing Persons Unit
- The Cleaning Lady
- The Great North
- Grimsburg (delayed to 2026–27)
- Rescue: HI-Surf

=== NBC ===
Returning series:

- American Ninja Warrior
- America's Got Talent
- Big Ten Saturday Night
- Brilliant Minds
- Chicago Fire
- Chicago Med
- Chicago P.D.
- Dateline NBC
- Destination X
- Football Night in America
- Happy's Place
- The Hunting Party
- Law & Order
- Law & Order: Organized Crime (reruns) (Note: A Peacock original series; airs repeats; previously aired on NBC from 2021 to 2024.)
- Law & Order: Special Victims Unit
- Major League Baseball on NBC
- NBA on NBC
- Password
- Sunday Night Baseball (moved from ESPN)
- NBC Sunday Night Football
- St. Denis Medical
- The Voice
- The Wall
- WNBA on NBC

New series:

- **The Fall and Rise of Reggie Dinkins**
- **On Brand with Jimmy Fallon**
- **The Paper** (Note: A Peacock original series; airs repeats.)
- **Stumble**
- **Surviving Earth**

Not returning from 2024–25:

- The Americas (returning for 2027–28)
- Deal or No Deal Island
- Found
- Grosse Pointe Garden Society
- The Irrational
- Lopez vs Lopez
- Night Court
- Suits LA
- Transplant
- Yes, Chef!

== Renewals and cancellations ==
=== Full season pickups ===
==== ABC ====
- Shifting Gears—Picked up for three additional episodes on September 5, 2025, bringing the episode count to 13.

==== CBS ====
- DMV—Picked up for a 20-episode full season order on September 17, 2025.

==== Fox ====
- Doc—Picked up for a 22-episode second season on February 26, 2025.

=== Renewals ===
==== ABC ====
- 20/20—Renewed for a forty-ninth season on May 12, 2026.
- 9-1-1—Renewed for a tenth season on March 5, 2026.
- 9-1-1: Nashville—Renewed for a second season on March 5, 2026.
- Abbott Elementary—Renewed for a sixth season on March 4, 2026.
- American Idol—Renewed for a twenty-fifth season on July 29, 2026.
- Celebrity Jeopardy—Renewed for a fifth season on May 12, 2026.
- Dancing with the Stars—Renewed for a thirty-fifth season on April 22, 2026.
- Grey's Anatomy—Renewed for a twenty-third season on March 30, 2026.
- High Potential—Renewed for a third season on March 5, 2026.
- ABC Hockey Saturday—Renewed for a thirteenth season on March 10, 2021; deal will last into a fourteenth season in 2027.
- Monday Night Football—Renewed for a seventh season on March 18, 2021; deal will go to a thirteenth season in 2033.
- R.J. Decker—Renewed for a second season on May 8, 2026.
- The Rookie—Renewed for a ninth season on April 13, 2026.
- Scrubs—Renewed for an eleventh season on April 30, 2026.
- Shifting Gears—Renewed for a third season on April 30, 2026.
- Will Trent—Renewed for a fifth season on April 13, 2026.

==== CBS ====
- 48 Hours—Renewed for a thirty-eighth season on April 15, 2026.
- 60 Minutes—Renewed for a fifty-ninth season on April 15, 2026.
- The Amazing Race—Renewed for a thirty-ninth season on January 22, 2026.
- Big Brother—Renewed for a twenty-ninth and thirtieth season on October 1, 2026.
- Boston Blue—Renewed for a second season on December 3, 2025.
- CIA—Renewed for a second season on March 23, 2026.
- Elsbeth—Renewed for a fourth season on January 22, 2026.
- FBI—Renewed for a ninth season on April 9, 2024.
- Fire Country—Renewed for a fifth season on January 22, 2026.
- Georgie & Mandy's First Marriage—Renewed for a third season on January 22, 2026.
- Ghosts—Renewed for a sixth season on February 20, 2025.
- Harlan Coben's Final Twist—Renewed for a second season on April 15, 2026.
- Marshals—Renewed for a second season on March 12, 2026.
- Matlock—Renewed for a third season on January 22, 2026.
- NCIS—Renewed for a twenty-fourth season on January 22, 2026.
- NCIS: Origins—Renewed for a third season on January 22, 2026.
- NCIS: Sydney—Renewed for a fourth season on January 22, 2026.
- Sheriff Country—Renewed for a second season on December 3, 2025.
- Survivor—Renewed for a fifty-first and fifty-second season on January 22, 2026.
- Tracker—Renewed for a fourth season on January 22, 2026.

==== The CW ====
- Police 24/7—Renewed for a fourth season on August 3, 2026.
- Scrabble—Renewed for a third season on August 3, 2026.
- Sullivan's Crossing—Renewed for a fifth season on July 16, 2026.
- Trivial Pursuit—Renewed for a third season on August 3, 2026.

==== Fox ====
- 99 to Beat—Renewed for a second season on May 11, 2026.
- American Dad!—Renewed for a twenty-third, twenty-fourth and twenty-fifth season on April 2, 2025.
- Animal Control—Renewed for a fifth season on February 26, 2026.
- Best Medicine—Renewed for a second season on March 2, 2026.
- Bob's Burgers—Renewed for a seventeenth, eighteenth and nineteenth season on April 2, 2025.
- Celebrity Name That Tune—Renewed for a sixth season on May 11, 2026.
- Celebrity Weakest Link—Renewed for a second season on May 11, 2026.
- Crime Scene Kitchen—Renewed for a fourth season on May 11, 2026.
- Doc—Renewed for a third season on March 9, 2026.
- Don't Forget the Lyrics—Renewed for a fourth season on May 11, 2026.
- Extracted—Renewed for a third season on May 11, 2026.
- Family Guy—Renewed for a twenty-fifth, twenty-sixth and twenty-seventh season on April 2, 2025.
- Fear Factor: House of Fear—Renewed for a second season on April 23, 2026.
- The Floor—Renewed for a sixth and seventh season on February 6, 2026.
- Gordon Ramsay's Secret Service—Renewed for a second season on May 11, 2026.
- Hell's Kitchen—Renewed for a twenty-fifth and twenty-sixth season on May 11, 2026.
- Kitchen Nightmares—Renewed for a tenth season on May 11, 2026.
- Krapopolis—Renewed for a fourth season on July 25, 2024, and a fifth season on May 10, 2025.
- Lego Masters—Renewed for a sixth season on May 11, 2026.
- The Masked Singer—Renewed for a fifteenth season on May 8, 2026.
- MasterChef—Renewed for a seventeenth season on October 9, 2025.
- Memory of a Killer—Renewed for a second season on April 6, 2026.
- Murder in a Small Town—Renewed for a third season on May 7, 2026.
- Nation's Dumbest—Renewed for a second season on October 27, 2026.
- Next Level Baker—Renewed for a second season on May 11, 2026.
- Next Level Chef—Renewed for a sixth season on February 27, 2025.
- The Simpsons—Renewed for a thirty-eighth, thirty-ninth and fortieth season on April 2, 2025.
- Special Forces: World's Toughest Test—Renewed for a fifth season on May 11, 2026.
- Universal Basic Guys—Renewed for a third season on May 10, 2025.

==== NBC ====
- American Ninja Warrior—Renewed for an eighteenth and nineteenth season on August 31, 2026.
- Big Ten Saturday Night—Renewed for a fourth season on August 18, 2022; deal will last into a seventh season in 2029.
- Chicago Fire—Renewed for a fifteenth season on March 27, 2026.
- Chicago Med—Renewed for a twelfth season on March 27, 2026.
- Chicago P.D.—Renewed for a fourteenth season on March 27, 2026.
- Dateline NBC—Renewed for a thirty-fifth season on May 11, 2026.
- The Fall and Rise of Reggie Dinkins—Renewed for a second season on May 5, 2026.
- Football Night in America—Renewed for a twenty-first season on March 18, 2021; deal will go to a twenty-eighth season in 2033.
- Happy's Place—Renewed for a third season on February 2, 2026.
- Law & Order—Renewed for a twenty-sixth season on May 8, 2026.
- Law & Order: Special Victims Unit—Renewed for a twenty-eighth season on April 16, 2026.
- NBC Sunday Night Football—Renewed for a twenty-first season on March 18, 2021; deal will go to a twenty-eighth season in 2033.
- St. Denis Medical—Renewed for a third season on February 2, 2026.

=== Cancellations/series endings ===
==== ABC ====
- Dirty Talk: When Daytime Talk Shows Ruled TV—The miniseries is meant to run for one season only; it concluded on January 28, 2026.

==== CBS ====
- DMV—Canceled on March 27, 2026. The series concluded on May 11, 2026.
- The Neighborhood—It was announced on March 10, 2025, that season eight would be the final season. The series concluded on May 11, 2026.
- Watson—Canceled on March 27, 2026 after two seasons. The series concluded on May 3, 2026.

==== The CW ====
- All American—It was announced on June 2, 2025 that season eight would be the final season. The series concluded on September 28, 2026.

==== Fox ====
- The Faithful: Women of the Bible—The miniseries is meant to run for one season only; it concluded on April 5, 2026.
- Going Dutch—Canceled on May 4, 2026 after two seasons.

==== NBC ====
- Brilliant Minds—Pulled from the schedule after fourteen episodes in the second season on February 4, 2026. The series was officially canceled on May 1, 2026. The remaining episodes of the second season premiered on May 27, 2026. The series concluded on July 1, 2026.
- The Hunting Party—Canceled on June 2, 2026 after two seasons.
- Law & Order: Organized Crime—Canceled on April 16, 2026, after five seasons.
- On Brand with Jimmy Fallon—Canceled on May 11, 2026.
- Stumble—Canceled on May 1, 2026.
- Surviving Earth—The documentary miniseries is meant to run for one season only; it concluded on July 30, 2026.

== See also ==
- 2025–26 Canadian network television schedule
- 2025–26 United States network television schedule (morning)
- 2025–26 United States network television schedule (daytime)
- 2025–26 United States network television schedule (late night)
- 2025–26 United States network television schedule (overnight)
