= ABC News Studios =

Documentary arm of ABC News

- Type: Division
- Industry: Television production
- Founded: July 26, 2022; 4 years ago
- Headquarters: New York, United States
- Parent: ABC News

ABC News Studios is a non-fiction division of ABC News that is part of Disney Entertainment Television, itself a division of The Walt Disney Company. The studio produces, commissions and acquires feature length documentaries, docu-series and specials for Disney owned streaming services and networks.

== History ==
ABC News Studios was founded on July 26 2022, when ABC News announced its expansion to its documentary efforts by launching a dedicated production arm that would bring all of ABC News' documentary and docu-series under a new division. The new documentary studio would produce original programming for Disney's networks & streaming services and other platforms.

== Filmography ==
=== Television ===
| Title | Years | Network | Notes |
|---|---|---|---|
| Wild Crime | 2021–2024 | Hulu | co-production with Lone Wolf Media |
| City of Angels | City of Death | 2021 | Hulu | co-production with Highway 41 Productions |
| Explorer | 2022–2023 | National Geographic Channel | co-production with Lincoln Square Productions |
| Let the World See | 2022 | ABC | co-production with Kapital Entertainment, Roc Nation, Westbrook Studios and Cobble Hill Films |
| Keeper of the Ashes: The Oklahoma Girl Scout Murders | 2022 | Hulu | co-production with Standing Bear Entertainment |
| Have You Seen This Man? | 2022 | Hulu | |
| Mormon No More | 2022 | Hulu | |
| The Con | 2022 | ABC | |
| The Murders Before the Marathon | 2022 | Hulu | co-production with Anonymous Content and Story Syndicate |
| Where Is Private Dulaney? | 2022 | Hulu | co-production with Show of Force and Versus Pictures |
| Grails: When Sneakers Change the Game | 2022 | Hulu | co-production with Brainstormin' Productions |
| Impact X Nightline | 2022–present | Hulu | |
| Death in the Dorms | 2023–2024 | Hulu | co-production with The Intellectual Property Corporation and Yes, Like the River |
| Web of Death | 2023 | Hulu | co-production with Blink Films |
| Killing Country | 2023 | Hulu | co-production with Kaepernick Media |
| Still Missing Morgan | 2023 | Hulu | co-production with Scott Free Productions, 5Star Productions, NLA Productions and Mad Possum Pictures |
| The Lesson is Murder | 2023 | Hulu | co-production with Lone Wolf Media |
| Pretty Baby: Brooke Shields | 2023 | Hulu | co-production with Matador Content and Bedby8 |
| The Age of Influence | 2023 | Hulu | co-production with Part2 Pictures |
| The Ashley Madison Affair | 2023 | Hulu | co-production with Wall to Wall Media |
| Betrayal | 2023–present | Hulu | co-production with Glass Entertainment |
| Mother Undercover | 2023 | Hulu | co-production with Pioneer Productions |
| Demons and Saviors | 2023 | Hulu | co-production with Latchkey Films |
| Never Let Him Go | 2023 | Hulu | co-production with Show of Force and Blackfella Films |
| The Secret Life of Dancing Dogs | 2023 | Hulu | |
| Daughters of the Cult | 2024 | Hulu | co-production with Main Event Media |
| Me Hereafter | 2024 | Hulu | co-production with Committee Films |
| The Beauty Queen Killer: 9 Days of Terror | 2024 | Hulu | co-production 101 Studios and Ample Entertainment |
| At Witt's End - The Hunt for a Killer | 2024 | Hulu | co-production with Scott Free Productions, NLA Productions and Mad Possum Pictures |
| After Baywatch: Moment in the Sun | 2024 | Hulu | |
| Little Miss Innocent: Passion. Poison. Prison. | 2024 | Hulu | co-production with Plum Pictures |
| Scam Goddess | 2025 | Freeform | co-production with The Intellectual Property Corporation |
| Scamanda | 2025 | ABC | co-production with Pilgrim Media Group |
| Wicked Game: Devil in the Desert | 2025 | Hulu | |
| The Fox Hollow Murders: Playground of a Serial Killer | 2025–2026 | Hulu | co-production with One Traveler and All3Media |
| Murder Has Two Faces | 2025 | Hulu | co-production with Blue Ant Studios and Cortés Filmworks |
| Hey Beautiful: Anatomy of a Romance Scam | 2025 | Hulu | co-production with Anchor productions and Trinoculus Films |
| Not Her First Rodeo | 2025 | Freeform | |
| Born to Be Viral: The Real Lives of Kidfluencers | 2025 | Freeform | co-productions with Night Owl Pictures and Kickstream Productions |
| Her Last Broadcast: The Abduction of Jodi Huisentruit | 2025 | Hulu | co-production with Committee Films |
| Trophy Wife: Murder on Safari | 2025 | Hulu | co-production with XTR and Rolling Stone Films |
| Mr & Mrs Murder | 2025 | Hulu | co-production with Plum Pictures |
| Capturing Their Killer: The Girls on the High Bridge | 2025 | Hulu | co-production with Twist Media and Shakespeare Entertainment |
| Stalking Samantha: 13 Years of Terror | 2025 | Hulu | co-production with Bigger Bang |
| Death in Apartment 603: What Happened to Ellen Greenberg? | 2025 | Hulu | co-production with Lionsgate Alternative Television, Lewellen Pictures and Tanbark Pictures |
| Dirty Talk: When Daytime Talk Shows Ruled TV | 2026 | ABC | co-production with Radley Studios |
| The Scream Murder: A True Teen Horror Story | 2026 | Hulu | co-production with Lone Wolf Media |
| Girl on the Run: The Hunt for America's Most Wanted Woman | 2026 | Hulu | co-production with Plum Pictures |
| Betrayal: Secrets & Lies | 2026 | ABC | co-production with Glass Entertainment |
| Squatters: Get the F*** Out of My House | 2026 | Hulu | co-production with Milojo |
| The Cult of Natureboy | 2026 | Hulu | co-production with ZANDLAND |
| 20/20 Britain's Most Notorious Crime Investigations | 2026 | Hulu | co-production with Candle True Stories |
| Somebody Knows Something | 2026 | Freeform | co-production with Ample Entertainment |
| Welcome To The Family: The Murder of Dan Markel | 2026 | Hulu | co-production with Curious Films |
| Michael Strahan's Iconic | 2026–present | ABC | co-production with SMAC Productions |
| Surviving a Scandal | 2027 | ABC | co-production with Glass Entertainment |

=== Film ===
| Title | Release date | Distributor | Notes |
|---|---|---|---|
| Aftershock | July 19, 2022 | Hulu | co-production with Onyx Collective, Impact Partners, JustFilms/Ford Foundation, Malka Films and Good Gravy Films |
| The Lady Bird Diaries | November 13, 2023 | Hulu | co-production with Trilogy Films |
| Brats | June 13, 2024 | Hulu | co-production with Neon and Network Entertainment |
| Patrice: The Movie | September 30, 2024 | Hulu | co-production with All Ages Productions, ESS Projects and Cedar Road |
| Barbara Walters: Tell Me Everything | June 23, 2025 | Hulu | co-production with Imagine Documentaries and Latchkey Films |
| Ruby Red Handed: Stealing America's Most Famous Pair of Shoes | August 26, 2025 | Hulu | co-production with Committee Films |
| #SkyKing | April 14, 2026 | Hulu | co-production with Fifth Season |
| Darius Rucker: They Called Me Hootie | November 16, 2026 | Hulu | co-production with ITV America Nashville |
