= Murder Has Two Faces =

2025 documentary film series

- Genre: Docuseries
- Directed by: Lisa Cortés
- No. of episodes: 3

Production
- Executive producers: Lisa Cortés; Jon Sechrist; Tara Malone; Laura Michalchyshyn; Matthew Hornburg; Mark J.W. Bishop; Claire Weinraub; David Sloan
- Producer: Katie Conway
- Production companies: Cortés Filmworks; Blue Ant Studios; ABC News Studios

Original release
- Network: Hulu
- Release: May 6, 2025

Murder Has Two Faces is a 2025 true crime documentary film series by Lisa Cortés and Robin Roberts that highlights lesser-known cases that were overshadowed in the media by other murders covered more extensively. The series asks the question regarding these less covered cases: "Why didn’t they get the same level of attention as their notorious, eerily similar counterparts?" The series aims to shed a social justice lens on these lesser known cases.

== Development ==
The series was announced on April 29, 2025, and produced by Cortés Filmworks and Blue Ant Studios for ABC News Studios. Cortés wanted to challenge whose stories get to be told in the media, saying:

With Murder Has Two Faces,’ I wanted to challenge the narrative around whose stories get told — and why. These cases are as haunting as tragic and as deserving of national attention as the ones we all know. ABC News Studios and Robin Roberts were the perfect partners in helping bring visibility to these hidden figures. By spotlighting these overlooked lives, we’re not just telling true crime stories — we’re confronting the biases that determine which victims are seen, heard and afforded justice.

— Lisa Cortés

The series includes interviews with friends and families of the victims who fought for attention and justice for their loved ones. Additionally, this series explores the possible connections to their highly publicized counterpart cases.

== Episodes ==
=== Series overview ===
Season	Episodes	Originally released	
Season	Episodes	First released	Last released
1	3	May 6, 2025	May 6, 2025

=== Season 1 (2025) ===
No. overall	No. in season	Title	Original release date
1	1	"Chapter One"	May 6, 2025
Highlights the similarities between Laci Peterson and Evelyn Hernandez, both pregnant mothers living in the San Francisco Bay.
2	2	"Chapter Two"	May 6, 2025
Highlights the similarities between Chandra Levy and Joyce Chiang, both young attorneys who vanished and found dead in Washington, DC.
3	3	"Chapter Three"	May 6, 2025
Highlights the similarities between the Craigslist Killer and the Tagged Killer, an American serial killer who used social networking, to lure women to secluded locations where some met their tragic deaths
