= List of programs broadcast by CBS =

CBS Broadcasting Inc. (CBS) is an American commercial broadcasting television network that launched in 1941. It is owned by the CBS Entertainment Group division of Skydance Corporation and is one of the "Big Four" television networks. Below is a list of programs currently broadcast on the network.

== Current programming ==
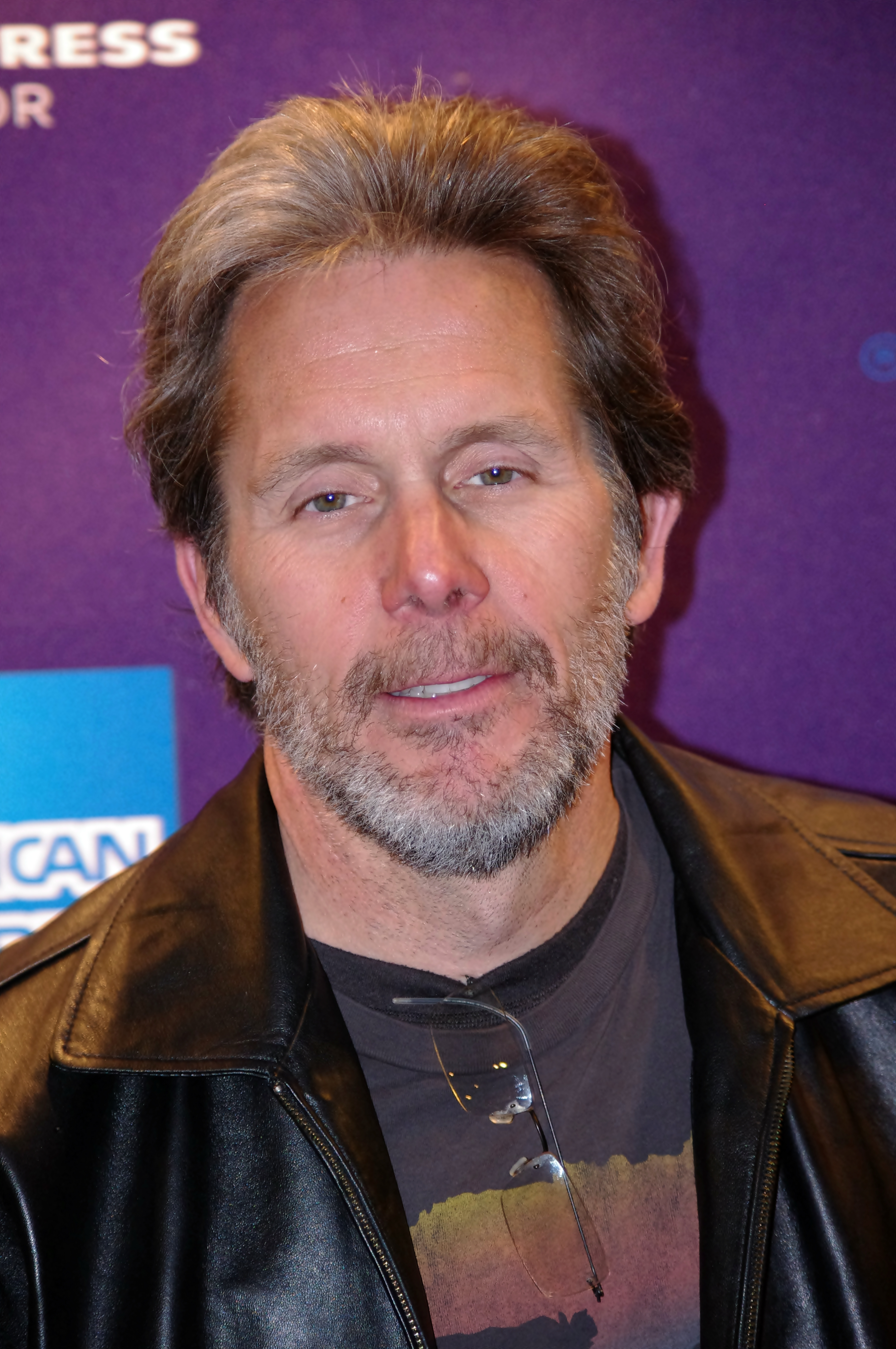
Gary Cole – star of the drama series NCIS

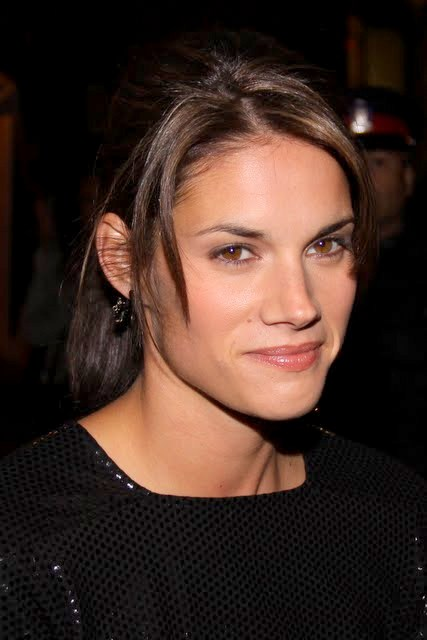
Missy Peregrym – star of the drama series FBI

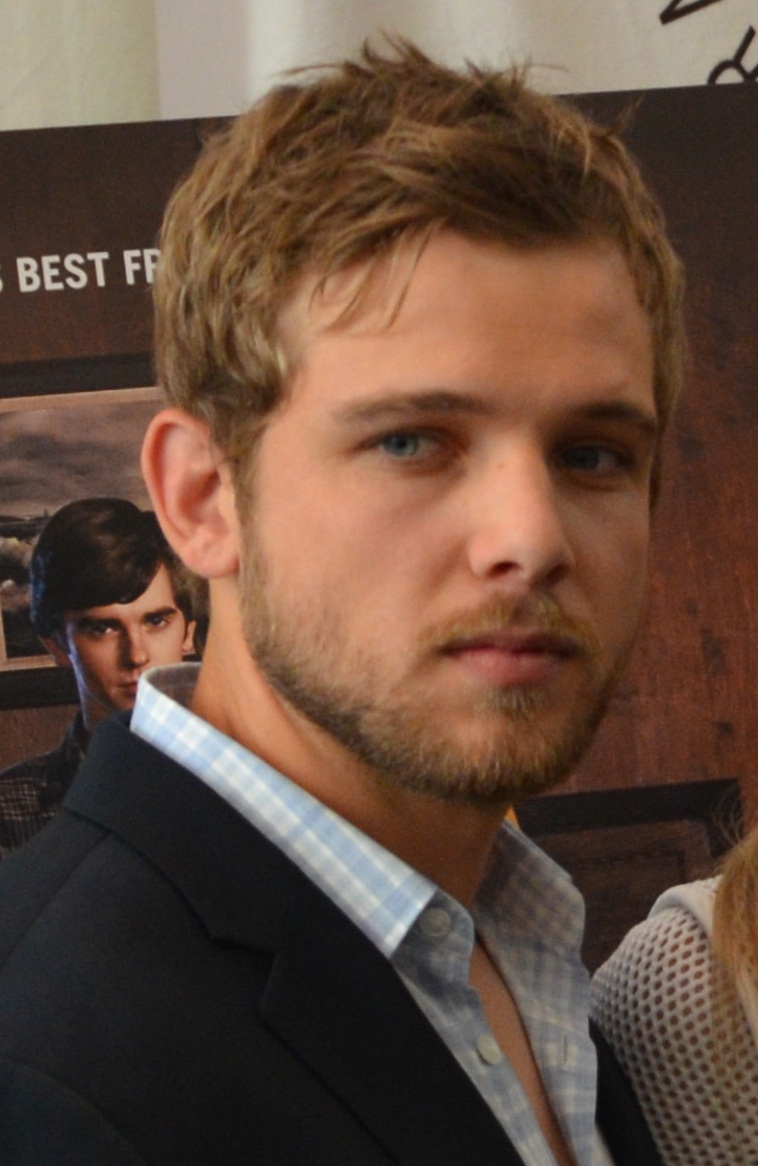
Max Thieriot – co-creator and star of the drama series Fire Country

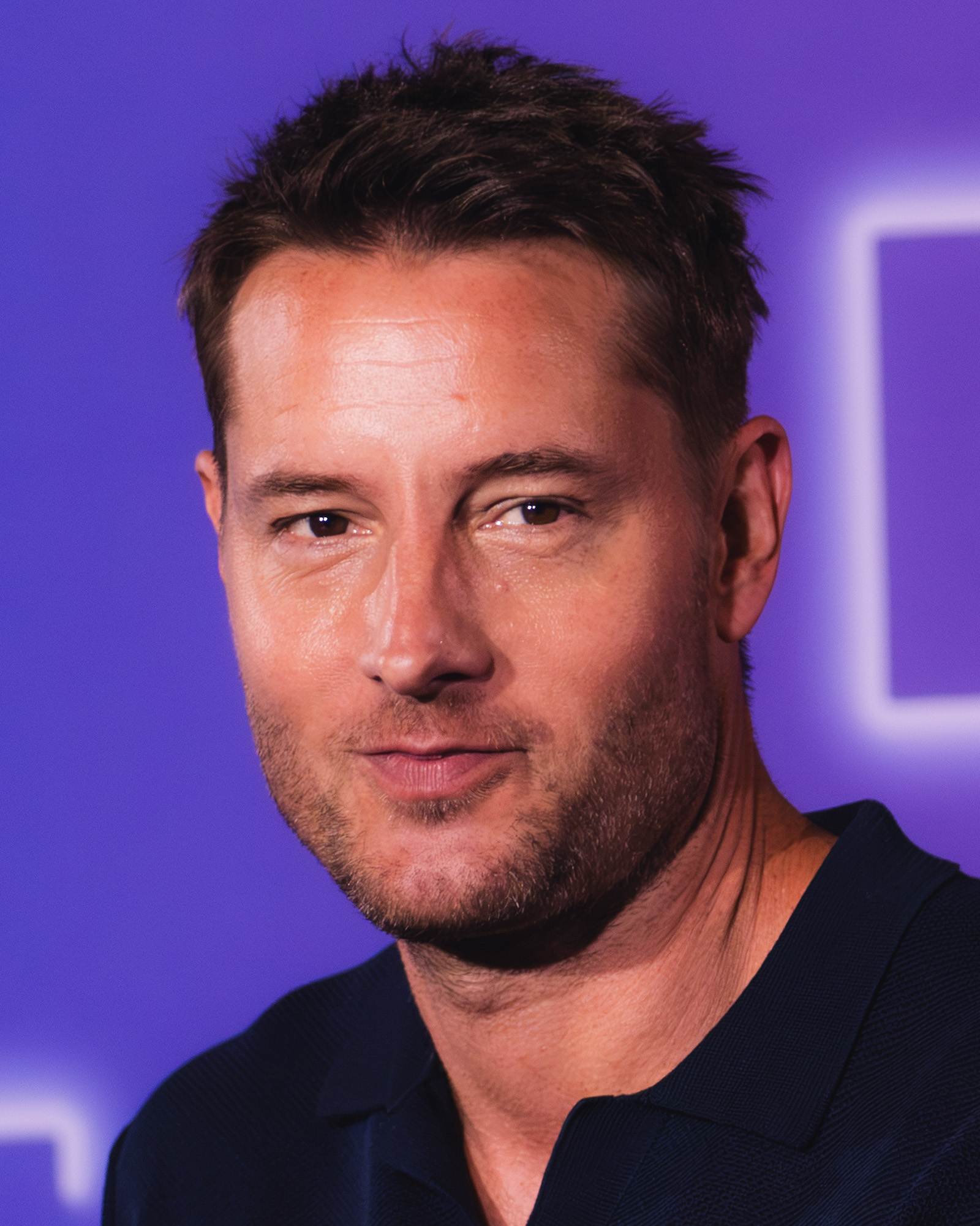
Justin Hartley – star of the drama series Tracker

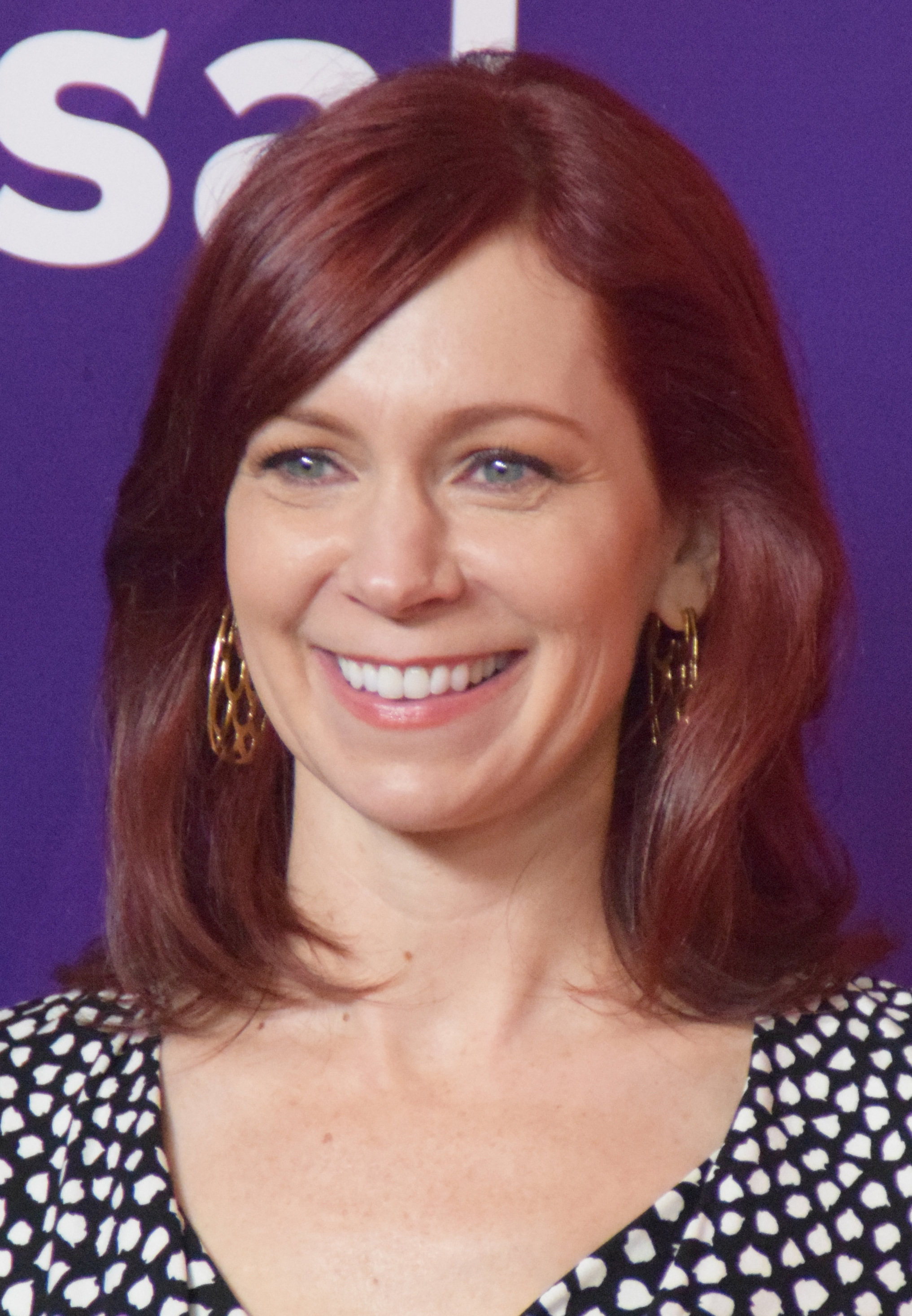
Carrie Preston – star of the drama series Elsbeth

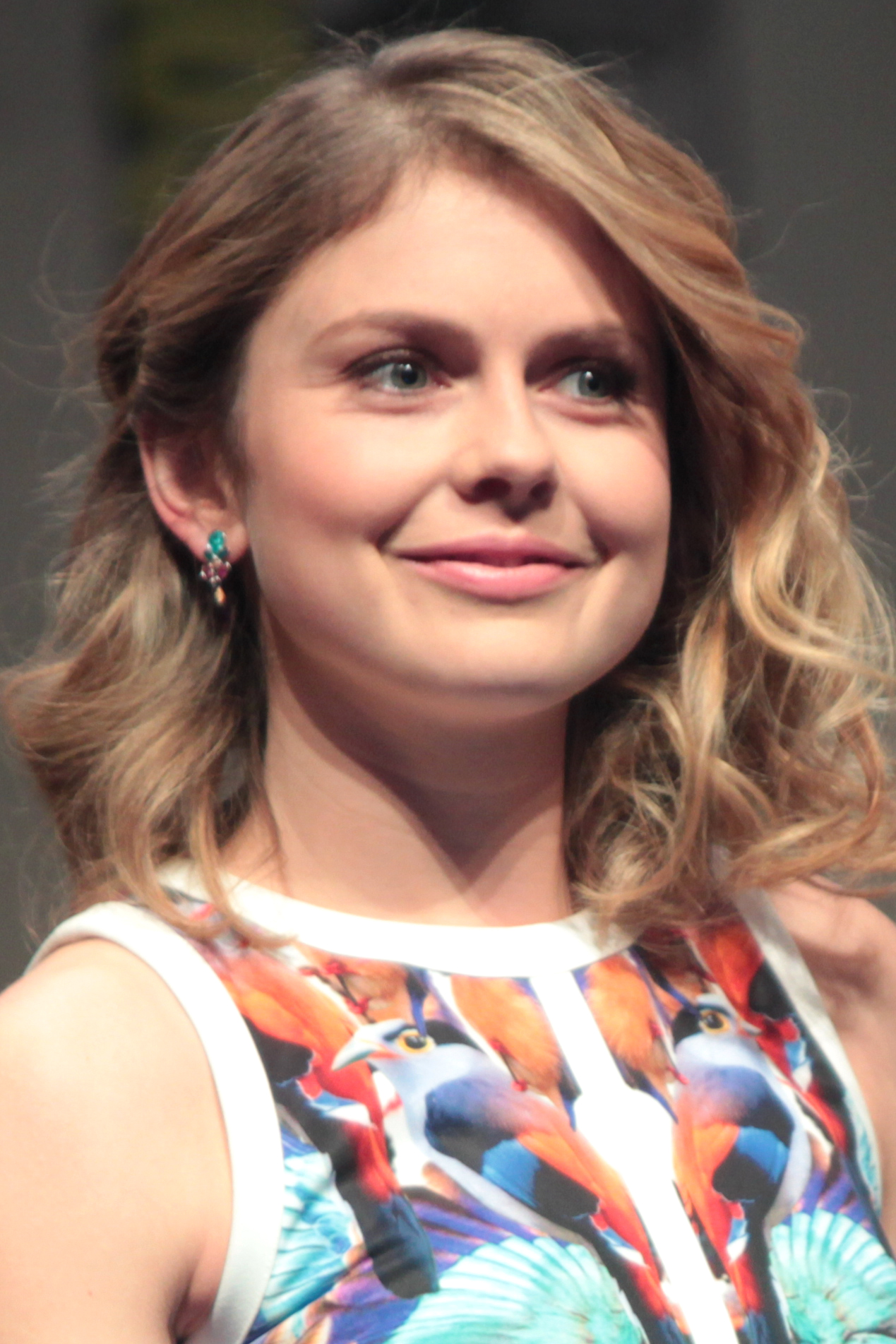
Rose McIver – star of the comedy series Ghosts

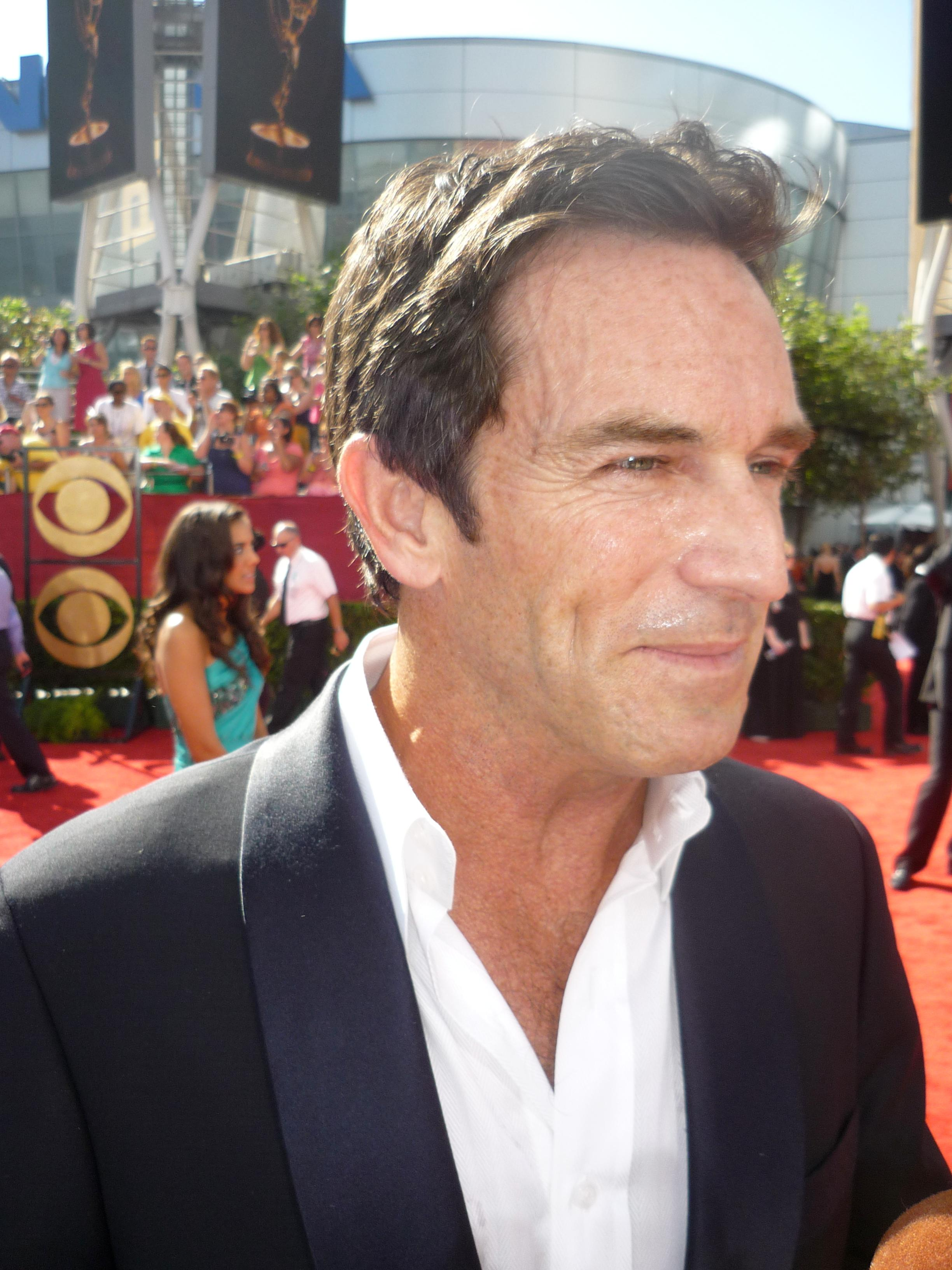
Jeff Probst – host of the reality series Survivor

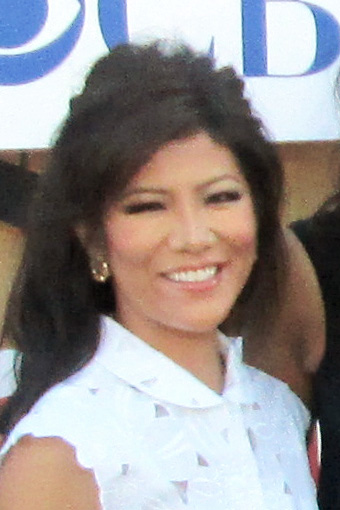
Julie Chen Moonves – host of the reality series Big Brother

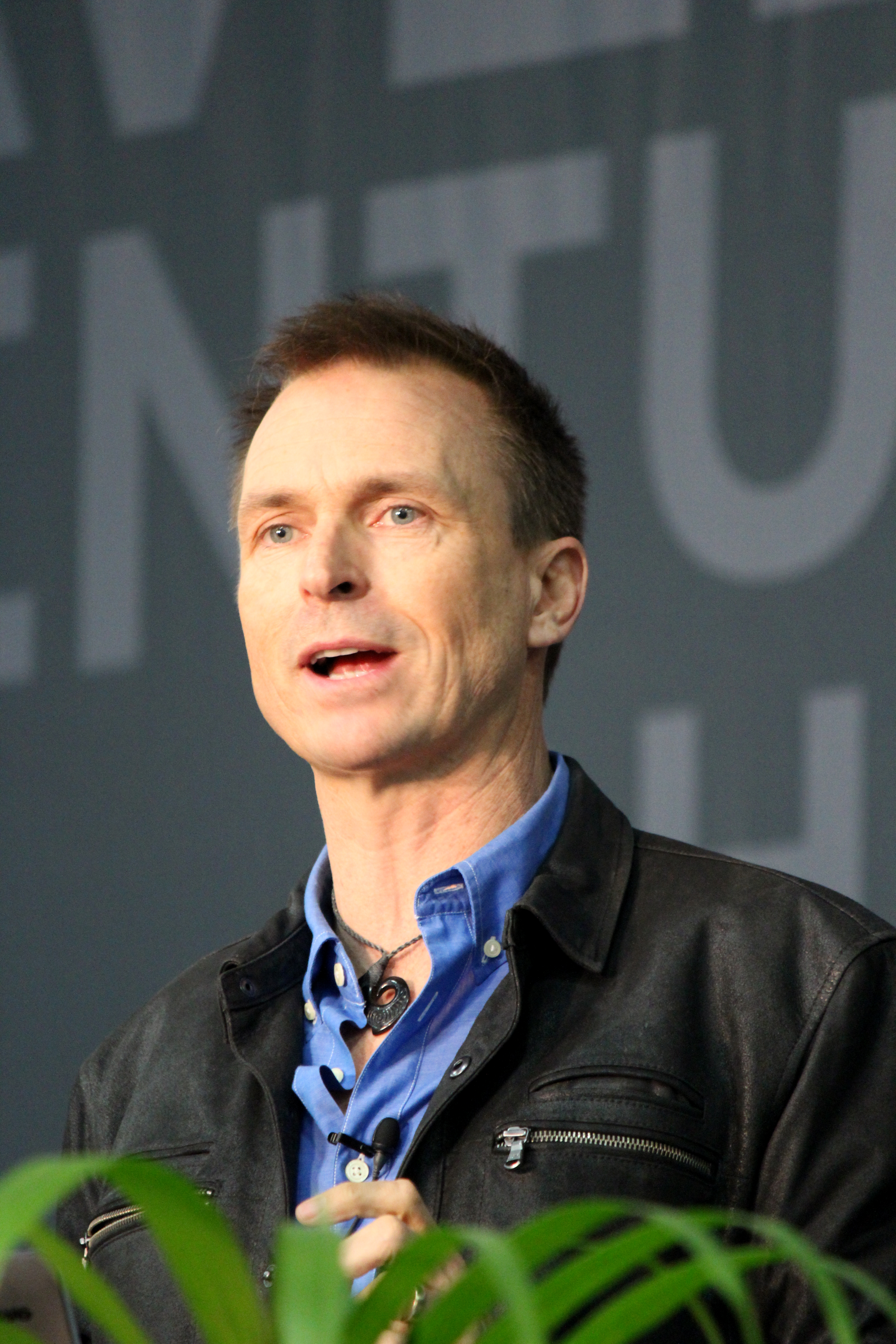
Phil Keoghan – host of the reality series The Amazing Race

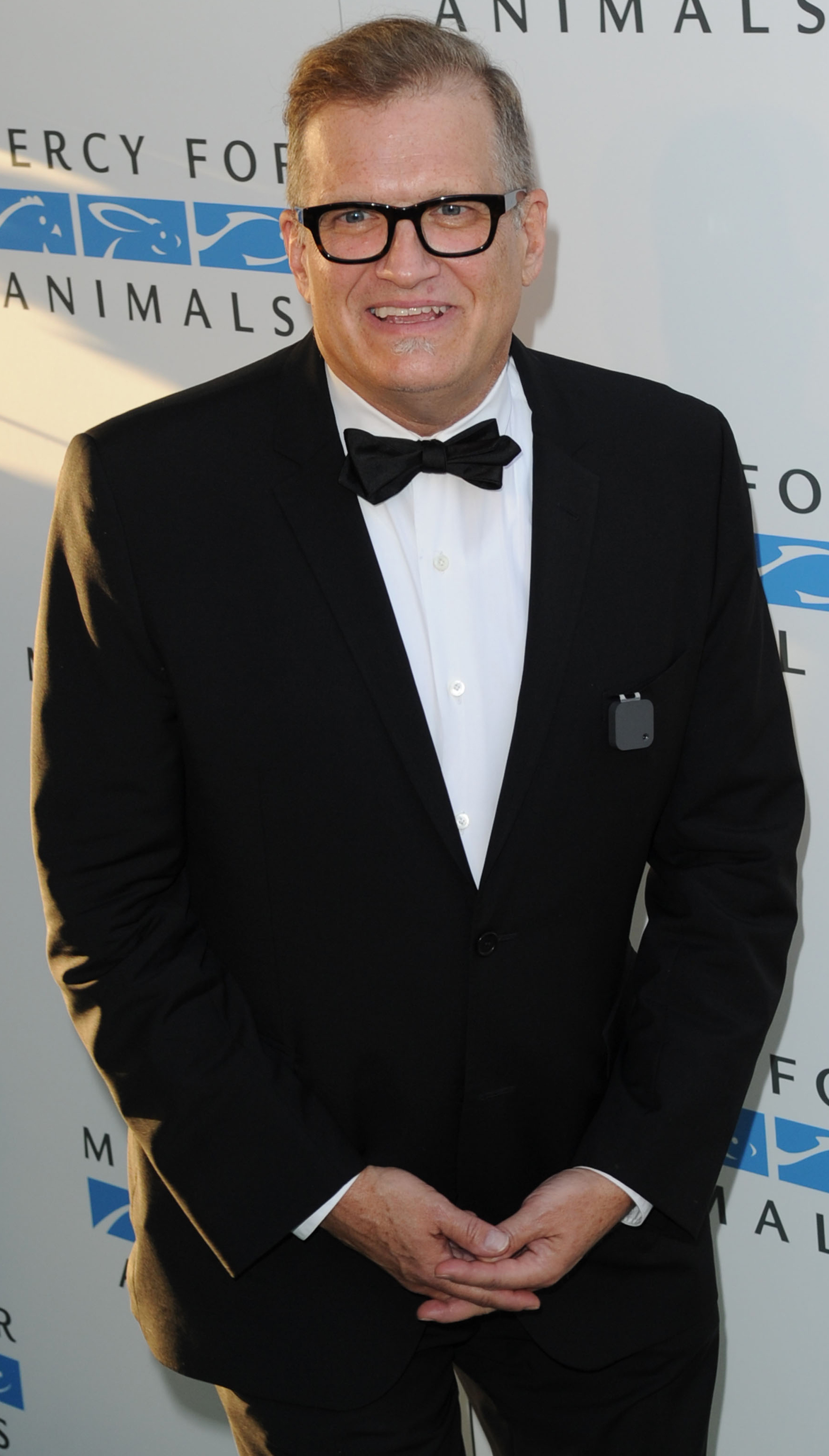
Drew Carey – host of the game show The Price Is Right

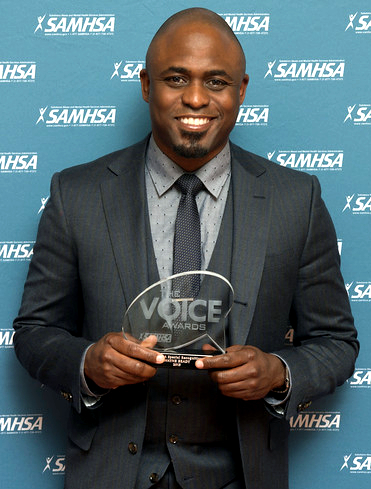
Wayne Brady – host of the game show Let's Make a Deal

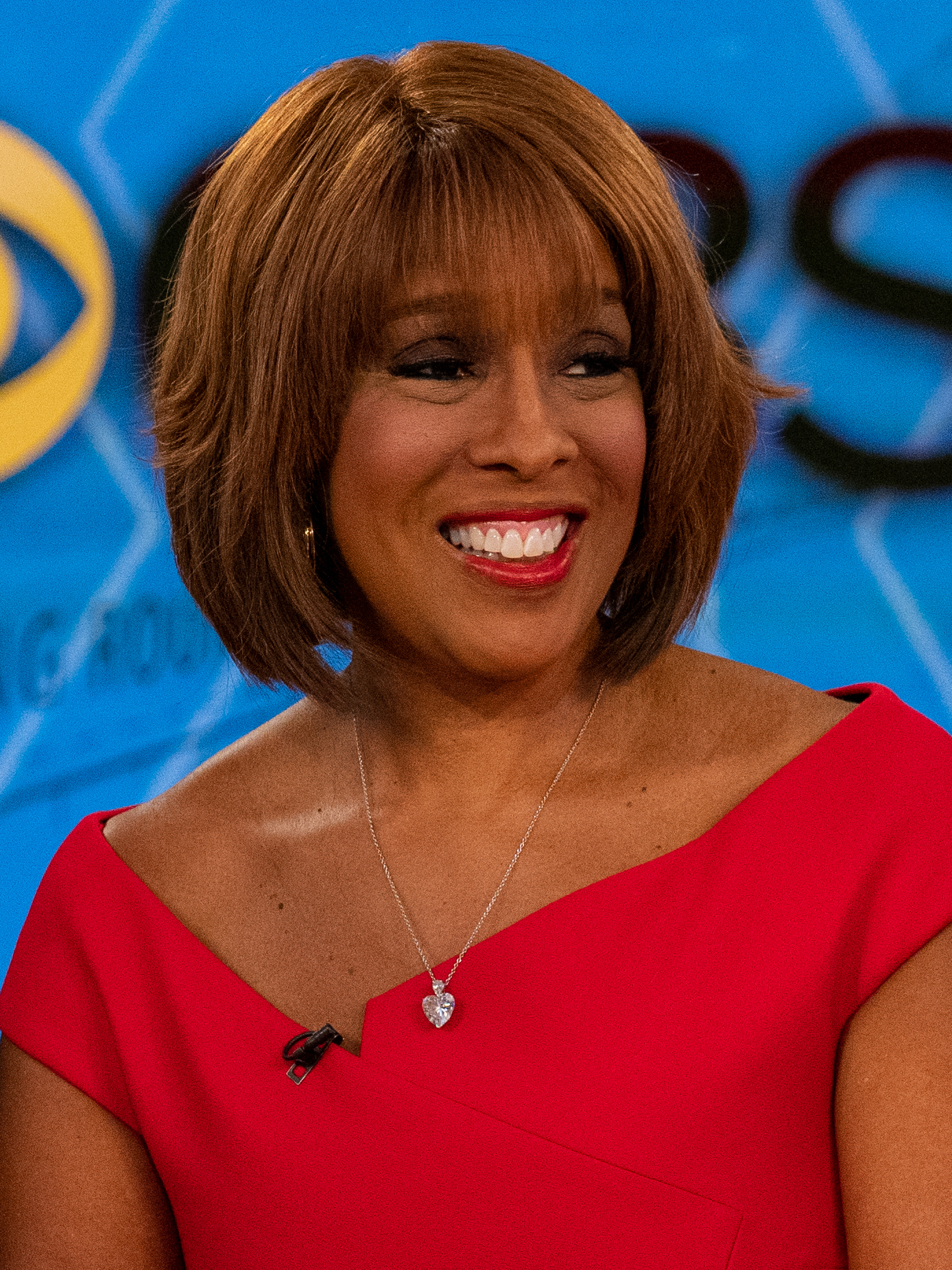
Gayle King – anchor of CBS Mornings

Jim Nantz – announcer for CBS's coverage of the NFL and the PGA Tour

=== Drama ===
Title	Genre	Premiere	Seasons	Runtime	Status
NCIS	Military procedural	September 23, 2003	24 seasons, 512 episodes	39–44 min	Season 24 ongoing
FBI	Police procedural	September 25, 2018	9 seasons, 163 episodes	44 min	Season 9 ongoing
Fire Country	Action drama	October 7, 2022	5 seasons, 78 episodes	44 min	Season 5 ongoing
Tracker	Action drama	February 11, 2024	4 seasons, 61 episodes	43 min	Season 4 ongoing
Elsbeth	Police comedy drama	February 29, 2024	4 seasons, 55 episodes	43 min	Season 4 ongoing
Matlock	Legal drama	September 22, 2024	2 seasons, 35 episodes	44 min	Season 3 due to premiere on January 21, 2027
NCIS: Origins	Military procedural	October 14, 2024	3 seasons, 41 episodes	42–44 min	Season 3 ongoing
Sheriff Country	Action drama/Police procedural	October 17, 2025	2 seasons, 26 episodes	43 min	Season 2 ongoing
Boston Blue	Police procedural	October 17, 2025	2 seasons, 26 episodes	43 min	Season 2 ongoing
CIA	Police procedural	February 23, 2026	2 seasons, 18 episodes	43 min	Season 2 ongoing
Marshals	Neo-Western/Police procedural	March 1, 2026	2 seasons, 19 episodes	43 min	Season 2 ongoing
NCIS: New York	Military procedural	October 6, 2026	1 season, 5 episodes	43 min	Season 1 ongoing
Cupertino	Legal drama	October 8, 2026	1 season, 7 episodes	42 min	Season 1 ongoing
Awaiting release
Einstein	Crime drama	February 12, 2027	TBA	TBA	Pending

=== Comedy ===
Title	Genre	Premiere	Seasons	Runtime	Status
Ghosts	Sitcom	October 7, 2021	6 seasons, 96 episodes	20–22 min	New episodes due to premiere December 10, 2026
Georgie & Mandy's First Marriage	Sitcom	October 17, 2024	3 seasons, 50 episodes	22 min	Season 3 ongoing
Eternally Yours	Sitcom	October 8, 2026	1 season, 6 episodes	22 min	Season 1 ongoing

=== Unscripted ===
==== Docuseries ====
Title	Subject	Premiere	Seasons	Runtime	Status
Harlan Coben's Final Twist	True crime	January 7, 2026	2 seasons, 11 episodes	43 min	Season 2 ongoing

==== Reality ====
Title	Genre	Premiere	Seasons	Runtime	Status
Survivor	Reality competition	May 31, 2000	51 seasons, 735 episodes	43–64 min	Season 51 ongoing Season 52 due to premiere on February 24, 2027
Big Brother	Reality competition	July 5, 2000	28 seasons, 1,016 episodes	20–120 min	Renewed for seasons 29–30
The Amazing Race	Reality competition	September 5, 2001	39 seasons, 450 episodes	43–86 min	Season 39 ongoing
Undercover Boss	Reality	February 7, 2010	11 seasons, 136 episodes	42 min	Season 12 due to premiere on February 24, 2027
The Greatest @Home Videos	Clip show	May 15, 2020	2 seasons, 16 episodes (Note: The series has aired 13 specials from November 11, 2022, to September 18, 2026.)	43 min	Pending
Big Brother: Unlocked	Reality competition	July 25, 2025	2 seasons, 11 episodes	43 min	Pending
The Road	Reality competition	October 19, 2025	1 season, 10 episodes	42–66 min	Pending
America's Culinary Cup	Reality competition	March 4, 2026	1 season, 11 episodes	42–65 min	Pending
Awaiting release
Stacks of Cash	Game show	January 6, 2027	TBA	TBA	Pending

==== Game shows ====
Title	Genre	Premiere	Seasons	Runtime	Status
The Price Is Right	Game show	September 4, 1972	54 seasons, 10,086 episodes	22–48 min	Season 54 ongoing
Let's Make a Deal	Game show	October 5, 2009	17 seasons, 2,160 episodes	44–52 min	Season 17 ongoing
Hollywood Squares	Game show	January 16, 2025	2 seasons, 42 episodes	43 min	Pending
Funny You Should Ask	Game show	May 22, 2026	1 season	30 min	Season 1 ongoing

==== Variety ====
Title	Genre	Premiere	Seasons	Runtime	Status
Comics Unleashed with Byron Allen	Late-night panel show	September 18, 2023	2 seasons (Note: Season 1 consisted of reruns that originally aired in syndication.)	30 min	Season 2 ongoing

=== Soap operas ===
Title	Genre	Premiere	Runtime	Status
The Young and the Restless	Soap opera	March 26, 1973	30–60 min	Ongoing; Renewed through 2028
The Bold and the Beautiful	Soap opera	March 23, 1987	19 min	Ongoing; Renewed through 2028
Beyond the Gates	Soap opera	February 24, 2025	43 min	Ongoing; Renewed through 2028

=== Acquired programming ===
Title	Genre	Original channel	Premiere	Seasons	Runtime	Status
NCIS: Sydney	Military procedural	Paramount+ (Australia)	November 10, 2023	3 seasons, 38 episodes	43 min	Season 4 due to premiere on January 26, 2027

=== Awards shows ===
Title	Premiere	Status
Tony Awards	June 4, 1978	Pending
Kennedy Center Honors	December 3, 1978	Pending
CMT Music Awards	April 11, 2022	Pending
Golden Globe Awards	January 7, 2024 (Note: CBS previously aired the Golden Globes from January 31, 1981 to January 30, 1982.)	Ongoing through 2030
American Music Awards	May 26, 2025	Ongoing through 2030

=== News programming ===
Title	Genre	Premiere	Runtime	Status
CBS Evening News	News	July 1, 1941	15–30 min	Ongoing
Face the Nation	Sunday morning talk show	November 7, 1954	30–60 min	Ongoing
60 Minutes	News magazine	September 24, 1968	60 min	Ongoing
CBS News Sunday Morning	News magazine	January 28, 1979	63 min	Ongoing
CBS News Roundup	News	October 3, 1982	60 min	Ongoing
CBS Morning News	News	October 4, 1982	23 min	Ongoing
48 Hours	News magazine	January 19, 1988	42 min	Ongoing
CBS Saturday Morning	News	September 13, 1997	84 min	Ongoing
CBS Mornings	Morning show	September 7, 2021	120 min	Ongoing

=== Specials ===
- The Story of Santa Claus (1996)
- Robbie the Reindeer in Hooves of Fire (2002)

=== Sports programming ===
- NFL on CBS (1956)
  - AFC games (and inter-conference games when the AFC team is the road team)
  - The AFC Championship Game
  - The Super Bowl (every four years)
  - The NFL Today (1961)
- PGA Tour on CBS (1970)
  - Masters Tournament (shared with ESPN and Prime Video)
  - PGA Championship (shared with ESPN)
  - PGA Tour (shared with NBC Sports, USA Sports, and ESPN)
- College Basketball on CBS (1981)
  - Select weekend regular season games
  - CBS Sports Classic
  - Missouri Valley Conference men's basketball tournament championship
  - Mountain West Conference men's basketball tournament championship
  - Atlantic 10 men's basketball tournament championship
  - Big Ten Conference men's basketball tournament semifinals and Championship
  - Big Ten Conference women's basketball tournament Championship
- College Football (1996)
  - Big Ten Conference Football, including:
    - Saturday Game of the Week
    - The Big Ten Championship Game (in 2024 and 2028)
  - The Sun Bowl
  - The Army–Navy Game
- NCAA March Madness (2011)
  - Selection Sunday
  - NCAA Division I men's basketball tournament (shared with TNT Sports)
    - Final Four and National Championship Game (in odd-numbered years)
- Big3 (2019)
- Formula E (2021–present)
  - New York City ePrix, as well as 1 additional race
- UEFA Champions League (2021)
- WNBA on CBS (2019)

== Upcoming programming ==
=== Unscripted ===
==== Reality ====
Title	Genre	Premiere	Seasons	Runtime	Status
24 Hour Millionaire	Reality competition	TBA	TBA	TBA	Pre-production

=== Pilots ===
==== Comedy ====
Title	Genre
Hilda! (In Lights!)	Sitcom

=== In development ===
==== Drama ====
Title	Genre
The Fishbowl	Police procedural
Flint	Police procedural
Grace	Crime drama
I Know Who You Are	Police procedural
The Pact	Medical drama
Ten House	Action drama
Strike Force	Crime procedural
Untitled Fire Country medical spinoff	Medical drama
Untitled Jared Padalecki medical drama	Medical drama
Van Helsing	Police procedural
Zorro	Action drama

==== Comedy ====
Title	Genre
Area 51	Sitcom
Auntie Supreme	Sitcom
Blanks	Sitcom
Bonnie	Sitcom
Checkpoint	Sitcom
The Chonga Girls	Sitcom
Feebs	Sitcom
Overstepping	Sitcom
Token White Friends	Sitcom
Untitled Kenya Barris/Mike Epps series	Sitcom
You're Only Young Twice	Sitcom

==== Reality ====
Title	Genre
Untitled Phil Keoghan competition series	Reality competition
