= Mormon No More =

Hulu documentary about leaving Mormonism

- Genre: Documentary
- Music by: Royce Martin
- Country of origin: United States
- Original language: English
- No. of seasons: 1
- No. of episodes: 4

Production
- Executive producers: Edward Hambleton, Claire Weinraub
- Producer: Keturah Gray
- Animator: Squid
- Production company: ABC News Studios

Original release
- Network: Hulu
- Release: June 24, 2022

Mormon No More is an American documentary television series that premiered on Hulu on June 24, 2022. The show follows Sally "Sal" Osborne and Lena Schwen as they discover their lesbian sexuality and leave the Mormon faith. The series also includes interviews and stories from other Mormon and ex-Mormon members of the LGBTQ+ community. Matt Easton, Brad Talbot, Brock Aiken, and Polly Choque-Mendoza all share their stories of struggle to reconcile their faith with their sexuality.

== Episodes ==
| No. | Title | Original Air Date |
|---|---|---|
| 1 | Born Into the Covenant: Who Am I Without Mormonism? | June 24, 2022 |
| 2 | On a Mission: I Get the Rest of My Life to Live My Truth | June 24, 2022 |
| 3 | Family Is Everything: Eternal Life in the Celestial Kingdom | June 24, 2022 |
| 4 | Reclaiming Tradition: Here Come the Brides | June 24, 2022 |

== See also ==
- List of Hulu original programming
- Under the Banner of Heaven
- Keep Sweet: Pray and Obey
