= Surviving Earth =

2026 American documentary series

- Genre: Nature documentary; Docudrama
- Directed by: Daniel Smith; Duncan Singh; Matt Dyas; James Morgan
- Narrated by: Josh Goodman
- Composer: Nitin Sawhney
- Countries of origin: United States; United Kingdom
- Original language: English
- No. of episodes: 8

Production
- Executive producer: Tim Haines
- Production companies: Loud Minds; Universal Television Alternative Studio

Original release
- Network: NBC
- Release: June 11 – July 30, 2026

Surviving Earth is a 2026 television nature documentary miniseries created for NBC that premiered on June 11, 2026, and was also released on Peacock. The eight-part series focuses on extinct animals and mass extinction events. It is produced by Universal Television Alternative Studio and the UK-based independent firm Loud Minds. Tim Haines, the creative director of Loud Minds, is best known as the creator of the successful series Walking with Dinosaurs (1999), as well as the founder of Impossible Pictures and co-creator of the British science fiction series Primeval (2007–2011).

== Production ==
Surviving Earth was announced on June 28, 2022, as a collaboration between Loud Minds and UTAS, with Tim Haines as creative director for the former.

On March 12, 2026, NBC confirmed that the series would premiere on June 4, 2026, which was later delayed to June 11, with new episodes released weekly, followed by encore episodes of The Americas (2025), NBC's previous prime time nature docuseries. First-look images were made available the day after the announcement. The first trailer for the series was released on April 30, 2026. A second trailer released on May 28, 2026.

The music for Surviving Earth was composed by Nitin Sawhney. The series is narrated by Josh Goodman, and over 300 scientists were consulted over the course of production.

=== Special effects ===
On August 4, 2022, Milk VFX was confirmed to be developing the series' digital effects. Milk had previously collaborated with Tim Haines and Loud Minds on an immersive attraction, Dinosaurs in the Wild, which toured the United Kingdom from 2017 to 2018. In total, 73 creatures and over 1000 CGI shots were created for the series. VFX supervisor He Sun called Surviving Earth "The largest show Milk has probably ever been part of".

Milk was not the only group responsible for the series' effects: FIN VFX and Floating Rock Studio led design and animation on several episodes, Lola Post Production (a subsidiary of Milk) created planetary CGI shots, and Compost Creative designed animated title cards unique to each episode.

== Episodes ==
No.	Title	Directed by	Original release date	Prod. code	U.S. viewers (millions)	Rating (18-49)
1	"When the Earth Burned"	Matt Dyas	June 11, 2026	101	2.72	0.27
In the Late Permian, 252 million years ago, a family of gorgonopsians (Inostrancevia) travel into the mountains of the far north to find refuge from extreme heat. One of the young encounters an Elph and a herd of Scutosaurus. His mother is killed when a lightning strike sends the Scutosaurus into a stampede. Distant volcanic eruptions spew carbon dioxide into the atmosphere, as the ozone layer fails, deserts expand, and the seas stagnate. The old male of the family fails to catch Suminia while acid rain torments other creatures in the area. Down on the plains, an Elph protects its colony from the footfalls of a Scutosaurus in search of shade. The old male gorgonopsian finally finds a dead Scutosaurus, but a rival male has already claimed it. An earthquake strikes and new volcanic fissures spill lava onto the plains as the two gorgonopsians grapple. The old male achieves victory, but at great cost to his health. The remnants of his family continue their doomed search for respite. Relatives of Elph persist thanks to their ability to burrow. 10 million years later, the Earth has recovered from the great Permian-Triassic mass extinction. Hatching Cyamodus attract Dongusuchus and proto-pterosaurs to a beach, and a Cymbospondylus unsuccessfully attempts to catch a distracted courting male Dongusuchus. The age of reptiles has dawned. In the modern day, humanity is releasing carbon dioxide at an even greater rate than the end-Permian eruptions, but we can avoid an extinction at the same scale by reducing emissions and preserving ecosystems which sequester carbon dioxide.
2	"When the Climate Broke"	Daniel Smith	June 18, 2026	102	2.29	0.22
In the Late Triassic, 232 million years ago, Earth is transitioning from a period of extremely wet climate to more unstable conditions. An Ischigualastia hatchling narrowly escapes being trampled by adult males of her own species, as well as affronts by a hungry Panphagia (an early dinosaur). A drought forces the Ischigualastia herd to travel far and wide in search of the plant Dicroidium, their main food source. They contend with competitive rhynchosaurs (Hyperodapedon) and predatory Saurosuchus. Two years pass, and the juvenile Ischigualastia is old enough to supervise new hatchlings in her diminishing herd. Saurosuchus ambush the herd at a cave and later a dry riverbed, but the juvenile and her charges escape both times, even as a flash flood heralds the end of the multi-year drought. 15 million years later, a Chaliminia forages for crickets to feed his family, but stumbles into the nest of a carnivorous family of Zupaysaurus. The arrival of a Lessemsaurus herd distracts the Zupaysaurus long enough for the Chaliminia to escape. In the modern day, climate change is pressuring humanity's water resources.
3	"When the Asteroid Fell"	Daniel Smith	June 25, 2026	103	2.40	0.21
In the Late Cretaceous, 66 million years ago, an older mated pair of Nanuqsaurus attend their nest (and a sheltering Unnuakomys) as spring arrives in the high Arctic. An asteroid strikes the Gulf of Mexico as a trio of young Nanuqsaurus stalk a herd of Edmontosaurus migrating north for the summer. Shockwaves send the herd into a stampede, killing one of the young Nanuqsaurus, but allowing the others to take down a young Edmontosaurus. The older Nanuqsaurus pair steal the kill and weather an oncoming blast of air from the distant impact. Dromaeosaurs (Saurornitholestes) plunder their unattended nest and scavenge from the Edmontosaurus corpse, as dust covers the globe. 2 months into the impact winter, the old couple abandons their frozen nest as plants and herbivores die off. One year after impact, the couple reside at a hot spring populated by insects and birds (Asteriornis). The old female is sick from starvation and the stress of egg development, and the two younger Nanuqsaurus arrive and kill her while the male is out hunting. The old male later dispatches one of the young upstarts, becoming the last of his own species. 5 million years later, the skies are clear and Earth is covered by tropical rainforests. A Plesiadapis falls into a river while searching for ripe fruit, and narrowly escapes being devoured by a Kosmodraco. Another Kosmodraco tries to bask on the riverbank, only to be supplanted by Titanoides as the Age of Mammals dawns. In the modern day, technologies such as DART may help detect and redirect threatening asteroids.
4	"When the Seas Died"	James Morgan	July 2, 2026	104	2.44	0.23
In the Late Cretaceous, 94 million years ago, a female Spinosaurus defends her hatchlings from Ichthyornis. Out to sea, a pregnant pliosaur (Brachauchenius) shoos away a shark investigating ammonites. Portunatasaurus pester Ichthyornis in a lagoon and hunt fish among reefs of rudist bivalves. Volcanic activity has led to stifling temperatures and nutrient-fueled dead zones in the deep sea, constricting the marine food web. The hungry female pliosaur injures herself while trying to hunt Portunatasaurus in the rudist reefs, while the Spinosaurus repositions to shade her hatchlings from extreme heat. An enormous storm reaches the coast as the female pliosaur goes into labor. The Spinosaurus fails to ambush Portunatasaurus on the coast, and instead she is swept up by a storm surge. As the storm breaks, the mother pliosaur is revealed to have been impaled on coastal trees. Her death provides a welcome meal to the wounded mother Spinosaurus. The new pliosaur calf also survived the ordeal, though the ongoing extinction event would eventually lead to the extinction of pliosaurs as a whole. 5 million years later, a dead nodosaur floats out to sea and inspires a food chain. The corpse attracts fish, drawing in a Pteranodon sternbergi, which falls prey to a Cretoxyrhina. Finally, a large mosasaur (Tylosaurus) arrives to dispatch the Cretoxyrhina as the nodosaur carcass sinks to the seafloor. Its bones and armor become the basis for a new coral reef. In the modern day, baleen whales are threatened by warming oceans, as they rely on a carefully-balanced food web driven by cool currents.
5	"When the Forests Collapsed"	Matt Dyas	July 9, 2026	105	2.53	0.25
In the Late Carboniferous, 305 million years ago, a Diplocaulus finds an underground pool to hold her water-dependent eggs. She inhabits a lush swampy coal forest of scale trees (Lepidodendron), which pump oxygen into the atmosphere while locking up carbon in the ground. A Dendromaia and her offspring narrowly escape a forest fire fueled by excess oxygen, while south polar ice caps expand, seas cool, and the tropics are pushed towards drought. In order to mate, male Eryops compete with low rumbles and wrestling. An Arthropleura briefly disturbs the nesting Diplocaulus while foraging for detritus. As the drought worsens, trees die and amphibian larvae suffer. The Diplocaulus transports her larvae out of the drying pool and into a shallow stream. She escapes an Orthacanthus lurking in the channel, but eventually succumbs to the drought while aestivating in her burrow. 20 million years later, large amniotes have become ecosystem engineers in a drier, conifer-filled world. A Cotylorhynchus suffers from indigestion after eating a toxic plant, while the rest of its herd wards off a predatory Dimetrodon hoping for an easy meal. In the modern day, deforestation threatens Earth's rainforests, which rely on secondary growth to repopulate disturbed areas.
6	"When the Oceans Shrank"	James Morgan	July 16, 2026	106	2.59	0.22
In the Late Ordovician, 444 million years ago, the land is barren while shallow seas teem with coral reefs. A male Sacabambaspis becomes stuck while scavenging inside a shell, before fleeing from the reef's resident cephalopods and a "sea scorpion" (Megalograptus) molting in a cave. Intense erosion on land supplies excess nutrients into the oceans, fueling algal blooms which absorb carbon dioxide. Falling carbon dioxide levels lead to cooling, as ice sheets cover the enormous southern continent. In a clearing among a patch of sea lilies, male Sacabambaspis gather to construct nests and attract females. The sea scorpion disrupts the nesting ground while hunting bristle worms (Kingnites), and one of the male Sacabambaspis is knocked into a rip tide which carries him out to the open sea. He seeks shelter among giant orthocones (Endoceras) who are gathering to mate under a supermoon. The male Sacabambaspis and orthocones arrive back at the reef and successfully complete their mating rituals. A female orthocone defends her clutch of eggs from a sea scorpion, while Sacabambaspis fry escape freezing cold freshwater melting off an iceberg which has floated into the tropics. Over thousands of years, growing ice sheets lock up water and cause sea levels to plummet, decimating reef ecosystems. The ice eventually thaws once volcanic activity restores more carbon dioxide into the atmosphere. 15 million years later, the reefs have regrown, prowled by jawed fish (Nerepisacanthus). Some life forms, such as scorpions, millipedes, plants, and fungi, escape the water to found new ecosystems on land. Oxygen levels have risen high enough that lightning is able to start a fire among a grove of giant Prototaxites. In the modern day, coastal cities are threatened by sea level rise.
7	"When the Continents Collided"	Duncan Singh	July 23, 2026	107	2.55	0.23
At the start of the Pleistocene, 2.5 million years ago, a matriarch gomphothere (Cuvieronius) gives birth to a pair of calves while leading her herd southward through Central America. The herd repels a group of Smilodon later that night. As the landscape becomes increasingly arid, the herd pursues the sound of thunder, and one calf has a brief scuffle with a Glyptotherium, a recent arrival from South America. The matriarch eventually succumbs to the wounds from her Smilodon encounter, but another female takes up the mantle and the herd finds a narrow strait, the last remnant of seawater separating North and South America. The herd crosses the incipient Isthmus of Panama, a sandy spit which is so low that one calf nearly drowns once the tide rises. The herd reaches South America, encountering giant ground sloths (Eremotherium), herds of toxodonts (Falcontoxodon), and the native predators, terror birds (Phorusrhacos). The new matriarch crushes a terror bird after it harasses the Cuvieronius calves. 1 million years later, extinctions and new species have both resulted from the Great American Biotic Interchange. One new species, a giant South American Smilodon, overcomes a Cuvieronius calf but is driven off by a charging bull Cuvieronius before it can make the killing blow. In the modern day, European colonization of the Americas has led to another interchange of plant and animal species, leading some to expand while others are pushed towards extinction.
8	"When America Flooded"	Duncan Singh	July 30, 2026	108	2.65	0.25
Late in the Pleistocene, 12,000 years ago, Earth is warming from the most recent ice age. A hibernating short-faced bear (Arctodus) awakens to drive a dire wolf away from her den and cubs. The following spring, mammoths and mastodons forage in the fresh growth as the mother bear finds a camp of humans (Homo sapiens) and chases its inhabitant up a tree. An old stag-moose (Cervalces scotti) escapes a pack of dire wolves, while the bear cubs have a run-in with a North American porcupine. At the peak of summer, a huge glacial lake in Northeast Canada formed by the melting Laurentide ice sheet breaches a dam of ice and rock, flooding the nearby river valley along its race towards the Atlantic. The bears are among the few survivors in the debris-choked landscape. As months pass, a male bear battles the mother and later dispatches one of the cubs. Atlantic currents are disrupted by the influx of meltwater, leading to a brief return to ice age conditions. The mother bear raids a human camp out of hunger, but succumbs to a spear wound. 1000 years later, mammoths and mastodons are on the brink of extinction. A mammoth is taken down by a coordinated hunt by humans, who are quickly becoming North America's most profound apex predators. The mammoth's calf survives the hunt alongside the last mastodon. In the modern day, the Atlantic meridional overturning circulation is threatened by meltwater of the shrinking Greenland ice sheet.
