= Bozoma Saint John =

American business woman and marketing executive

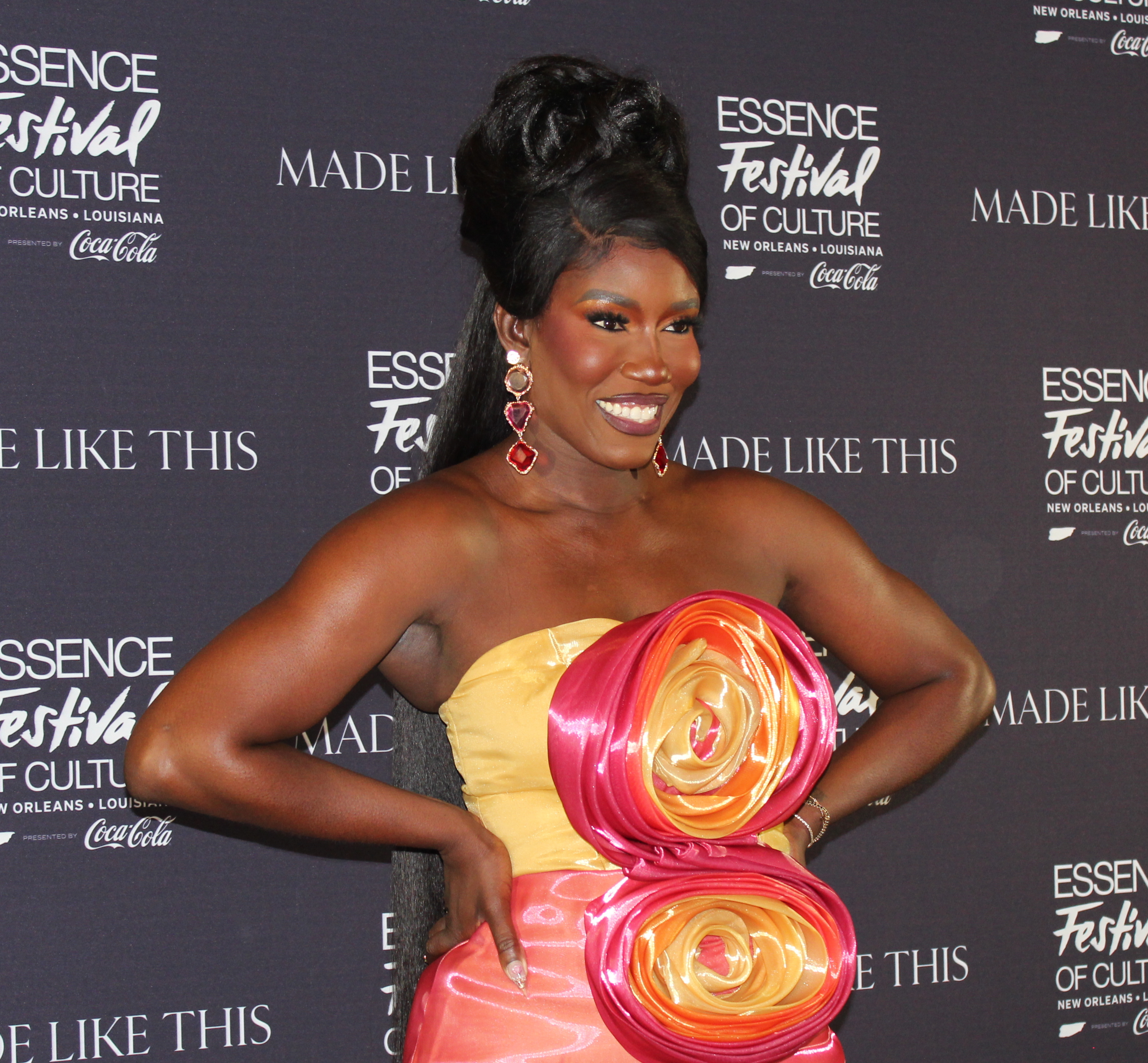
- Saint John at Essence Festival of Culture July 2025
- Born: Bozoma Afiba Mamekyi Arthur; January 21, 1977 (age 49); Middletown, Connecticut, U.S.
- Other name: Boz
- Education: Wesleyan University (BA)
- Occupations: Businessperson; marketing executive
- Employers: PepsiCo (2005–2014); Apple Music (2014–2017); Uber (2017–2018); Endeavor (2018–2020); Netflix (2020–2022)
- Television: The Real Housewives of Beverly Hills
- Height: 5 ft 11 in (180 cm)
- Spouses: Peter Saint John (m. 2003; died 2013) Keely Watson (m. 2026)
- Children: 1
- Website: bozomasaintjohn.com

Bozoma Afiba Mamekyi Saint John-Watson (née Arthur; born January 21, 1977) is a Ghanaian-American businessperson and marketing executive who was the chief marketing officer (CMO) at Netflix from August 2020 to March 2022. Previously, she served as chief brand officer (CBO) at Uber from 2017 to 2018, and CMO at Endeavor from 2018 to 2020. Saint John was also a marketing executive at Apple Music until June 2017, after joining the company in its acquisition of Beats Music. From 2005 until 2014, she worked at PepsiCo, eventually serving as the head of music and entertainment marketing. In May 2021, she was named among the Top 50 Most Influential Female Leaders in Africa within the corporate and business sphere by Leading Ladies Africa.

== Early life ==
Saint John was born to Rev. Dr. Appianda Arthur and Aba Arthur (née Enim) in Middletown, Connecticut, in the United States. Her father was a clarinet player and member of the Ghana Army before emigrating to the United States to attend graduate school. When she was six months old, the family moved to Ghana, though, throughout her early childhood, her family lived between Nairobi, Kenya, and Washington, D.C. They settled in Colorado Springs, Colorado, when she was 12. Saint John cites her father as her "biggest inspiration".

In 1999, Saint John graduated from Wesleyan University with a degree in English and in African-American studies. Her father had received a PhD in ethnomusicology in 1977, also from Wesleyan.

Her sister Alua Arthur is a lawyer and death doula.

== Career ==
=== Marketing ===
After college, Saint John worked at the advertising agencies Arnold Worldwide and Spike Lee's Spike DDB. She also worked at the fashion brand Ashley Stewart, where she was vice president of marketing.

Saint John joined PepsiCo as a senior marketing manager in 2005. She later led PepsiCo's foray into music festival-based marketing as head of music and entertainment marketing. She remained with the company for almost a decade before joining Beats Music in 2014, when Jimmy Iovine of Beats recruited Saint John based on her experience in music marketing. Saint John moved from New York to Los Angeles to lead marketing for the company.

Beats was purchased shortly thereafter by Apple, and Saint John became the head of global consumer marketing for iTunes and Apple Music, commuting between Los Angeles and Apple's Cupertino headquarters several times a week. Journalists described Saint John's presentation of the redesigned Apple Music onstage during the 2016 Apple Worldwide Developers Conference as her breakthrough moment, with a captivating "passion" and persona that captivated both local and online audiences. Biz Carson of Business Insider said that her appearance helped to emphasize Apple's complete rebuild of its Apple Music software. BuzzFeed wrote that she was the "coolest" person to ever take the stage at an Apple keynote.

On June 6, 2017, Saint John became chief brand officer at Uber.

In June 2018, Saint John left Uber to join Endeavor as chief marketing officer. She said of her choice to leave: "When I got to Uber, I was honest in my desire to go and change essentially what I thought was a challenging environment, especially for women and for people of colour... What I discovered was a lot of people who had a desire to do better, honestly, but couldn't get out of their own way... At some point, it became too overwhelming for me... It became a good lesson for all of us: You don't need to be the savior, you can save yourself too." While at Endeavor, Saint John helped lead a "crisis" branding project for Papa John's Pizza after the company's founder, John Schnatter, used racist language in a conference call.

Netflix named Saint John its new chief marketing officer on June 30, 2020, making her the third CMO for the company in 2019–2020. She was the first Black C-level executive at Netflix. Saint John replaced Jackie Lee-Joe, who left the company for personal reasons. Saint John started the new role in August 2020 and departed in March 2022.

In autumn 2025, Saint John co-hosted the American reality competition On Brand with Jimmy Fallon. In May 2026, the show was canceled after one season, due to poor ratings.

=== Writing and podcasting ===
In May 2020, Saint John launched a limited-series iHeart Media podcast alongside journalist Katie Couric, Back to Biz with Katie and Boz. The podcast began with the focus of how small and large businesses across the country began to reopen throughout the coronavirus pandemic, but after the murder of George Floyd expanded to focus also on systemic racism and criminal justice reform.

Saint John wrote a memoir titled The Urgent Life, in which she describes her work as a marketing executive, losing her husband, and becoming a single parent. The book's publication date was February 21, 2023, by Viking Press.

=== Other work ===
In January 2021, Saint John taught a short intensive program for MBA candidates at Harvard Business School called "Anatomy of a Badass".

In May 2024, it was announced that Saint John would be joining the cast of The Real Housewives of Beverly Hills as a full-time cast member for the fourteenth season.

== Activism, advising, and philanthropy ==
Saint John launched the #ShareTheMicNow Instagram initiative alongside Luvvie Ajayi, Glennon Doyle, and Stacey Bendet. On June 10, 2020, 52 Black women took over the Instagram feeds of 52 White women with large platforms to draw attention to the work they're doing to catalyze change. Saint John took over the Instagram account of prominent Black women including Elaine Welteroth, Angelica Ross, Christine Michel Carter, and Gia Peppers took over the accounts of White women including Julia Roberts, Elizabeth Warren, and Diane von Fürstenberg.

Saint John's philanthropic efforts include representing Pencils of Promise as a Global Ambassador to Ghana and serving on the boards of Girls Who Code and Vital Voices. Saint John has been a member of the President's Advisory Council for Wesleyan University, her alma mater. She is also a member of the Black Advisory Board for Impact, an initiative by the Council of Fashion Designers of America to address systematic exclusion of Black people in the fashion industry.

In May 2022, Saint John was inducted into the American Marketing Association Marketing Hall of Fame.

== Personal life ==
Saint John was married to Peter Saint John from 2003 until his death in 2013. They have a daughter named Lael Afiba.

Saint John lost her home in the Pacific Palisades fire in January 2025. She discovered this while on holiday in Zambia.

Saint John became engaged to boyfriend Keely Watson on August 29, 2025. They were married in Accra, Ghana, on August 21, 2026.

== Awards and honors ==
- 2015: Billboard, Top Women in Music
- 2016: Billboard, Female Executive of the Year
- 2016: Fortune, 40 Under 40
- 2017: Henry Crown Fellow in the Aspen Institute
- Ad Age, 50 Most Creative People, Innovators & Stars 40 Under 40 feature
- Adweek, Most Exciting Personalities in Advertising
- Ebony, 100 Powerful Executives
- Fast Company, 100 Most Creative People
- Fortune, Disruptors
- Top 100 Most Inspirational Women of the Year by Glitz Africa Magazine
