= Born to Be Viral: The Real Lives of Kidfluencers =

American documentary series

- Genre: Documentary
- Directed by: Ines Novačić
- Country of origin: United States
- Original language: English
- No. of seasons: 1
- No. of episodes: 6

Production
- Executive producers: Ines Novačić; Igal Svet; David Sloan; Claire Weinraub; Jennifer Joseph; Chris Donovan
- Production companies: ABC News Studios; Night Owl Pictures; Kickstream Productions

Original release
- Network: Freeform
- Release: June 23 – July 7, 2025

Born to Be Viral: The Real Lives of Kidfluencers is a social media documentary series. The series premiered on June 23, 2025, on Freeform. The series was directed by Ines Novačić and produced by executive producer Igal Svet.

== Episodes ==
| No. | Title | Original release date | U.S. viewers (millions) |
|---|---|---|---|
| 1 | "Birth of a Kidfluencer" | June 23, 2025 | N/A |
| 2 | "Follow Us!" | June 23, 2025 | N/A |
| 3 | "1 in 3 Kids" | June 30, 2025 | N/A |
| 4 | "#Trending" | June 30, 2025 | N/A |
| 5 | "A Brand New Child Star" | July 7, 2025 | N/A |
| 6 | "Kidfluencer to Influencer" | July 7, 2025 | N/A |

== Reception ==
Born to be Viral has received mostly positive reviews from critics.
