= Not Her First Rodeo =

American documentary series

- Genre: Documentary
- Directed by: Matt Wilson
- Starring: Jorden Halvorsen; Catalina Langlitz; Renata Nunes; Athena Rivera; Alexia Huffman
- Country of origin: United States
- Original language: English
- No. of seasons: 1
- No. of episodes: 6

Production
- Executive producers: David Sloan; Megan Harding; Claire Weinraub; Eamon McNiff
- Producers: Matthew Cullinan; Wendy Krantz; Sabrina Garcia; Misha Rezvi; Myles Sorensen; Cydney Tucker
- Editors: Zach Neumeyer; Jake Torchin
- Production company: ABC News Studios

Original release
- Network: Freeform
- Release: May 22 – June 5, 2025

Not Her First Rodeo is a rodeo documentary series. The series premiered on May 22, 2025, on Freeform.

== Premise ==
The series follows the Elite Lady Bull Riders, five women battling in and out of the arena, as they fight for a shot at a championship buckle.

== Cast ==
Name	Bull Rider Name	Age	Hometown
Jorden Halvorsen	The All Star	29	Youngsville, North Carolina
Catalina Langlitz	The Comeback Kid	22	Salado, Texas
Renata Nunes	The Legacy	19	Zacarias, Brazil
Athena Rivera	The Fighter	19	Rosarito, Mexico
Alexia Huffman	The Underdog	26	Raeford, North Carolina

== Episodes ==
No.	Title	Original release date	U.S. viewers (millions)
1	"The Most Dangerous Sport on Dirt"	May 22, 2025	N/A
2	"Seven Seconds Don't Pay the Bills"	May 22, 2025	N/A
3	"Legacy"	May 29, 2025	N/A
4	"The Name of the Game is Pain"	May 29, 2025	N/A
5	"Broken Dreams and Bodies"	June 5, 2025	N/A
6	"Eight Seconds of Championship Buckle"	June 5, 2025	N/A
