= TV We Love =

2025 television documentary series

- Genre: Docuseries
- Country of origin: United States
- Original language: English
- No. of seasons: 1
- No. of episodes: 8

Production
- Executive producers: Megan Harding; Shawn Efran; Morgan Hertzan; Azadeh de Leon; Michael Bass
- Production companies: Bright North Studios; CBS Studios

Original release
- Network: The CW
- Release: October 13, 2025 – present

TV We Love is an American television docuseries that premiered on October 13, 2025, on The CW. It is planned as an eight-episode series, which each episode exploring a classic television series.

== Synopsis ==
This series explores eight of "the most iconic" television shows in American' history, with each episode revolving around a different one.

== Episodes ==
No.	Title	Original release date	Prod. code	U.S. viewers (millions)	Rating (18–49)
1	"I Love Lucy"	October 13, 2025	102	0.39	0.0
2	"The Brady Bunch"	October 20, 2025	101	0.37	0.0
3	"The Love Boat"	October 27, 2025	104	0.31	0.0
4	"The Honeymooners"	November 3, 2025	106	0.30	0.0
5	"Happy Days"	November 10, 2025	103	0.39	0.1
6	"Dynasty"	November 17, 2025	105	0.21	0.0
7	"Cheers"	November 24, 2025	107	0.37	0.0
8	"Touched by an Angel"	December 1, 2025	108	N/A	TBA
