= The Greatest Average American (game show) =

American game show

- Genre: Game show
- Created by: Nate Bargatze; John Quinn
- Written by: Nate Bargatze
- Directed by: Rich DiPirro
- Presented by: Nate Bargatze; Julian McCullough; Greg Warren
- Country of origin: United States
- Original language: English
- No. of seasons: 1
- No. of episodes: 8

Production
- Executive producers: Nate Bargatze; John Quinn; Jeffrey Breeden; Brian Flach
- Producers: Julian McCullough; Dan Shaki
- Production locations: Nashville Municipal Auditorium; Nashville, Tennessee
- Production companies: Walt Disney Television Alternative; Nateland Entertainment; Da Da Productions

Original release
- Network: ABC
- Release: February 25, 2026 – present

The Greatest Average American is an American game show that premiered on ABC on February 25, 2026. The series is hosted and created by Nate Bargatze.

== Format ==
Each one-hour episode consists of two games; three contestants compete in each game. In the first round, the contestants are asked a series of three or four questions that are asked to a group of 100 people. The contestants get points for answering the questions correctly, with later questions worth more points (for episodes with four questions, 1–1–2–3; for episodes with three questions, either 1–2–3 or 1–1–2). One or two of the questions asks the percentage of people who got it right; the contestant who guesses closest to the correct percentage gets the points for guessing the closest percent. After this round, the contestant with the fewest points is eliminated. If there is a tie for second and third, a tiebreaker question is played, and the contestant who answers correctly advances.

In round two, Bargatze announces a challenge he will perform for up to 90 seconds (e.g., how many regulation basketball free throws he can make in 60 seconds). Before he performs, one contestant predicts the numerical result of the challenge, while the other contestant predicts over or under; the contestant leading with the higher score in round one decides who makes which prediction. After Bargatze performs the challenge, the predictions are revealed. If the contestant making the numerical prediction guessed exactly right, they automatically win. If not, the over/under prediction is revealed; a correct prediction wins, while an incorrect prediction loses. The winner of this round receives $10,000 and advances to the bonus round.

In the bonus round, the contestant has 30 seconds to predict the audience's favored response for seven questions, each of which has two answers (e.g., "Do you have any allergies?" or "Which season do you prefer: summer or winter?"). If the contestant gets at least five questions correct, they win $67,920 (the average US salary) and a prize for each member of the audience; if they do not, they keep the $10,000 they won in the main game.

== Production ==
On November 7, 2025, it was announced that ABC had ordered the series, which premiered on February 25, 2026.

== Episodes ==
No.	Title	Original release date	Prod. code	U.S. viewers (millions)	Rating (18-49)
1	"At Least This is Not on TV"	February 25, 2026	101	N/A	TBA
Episode 1 Results: Contestants: Melanie; Occupation: MS Secretary; Location: Florida; Jeremy; Occupations: Policy Director & Flute Player; Location: Indiana; Ana; Occupation: Purdue Senior; Location: Tennessee; Round 1: Question 1: Melanie: INCORRECT; Jeremy: CORRECT (1 Point); Ana: CORRECT (1 Point); Question 2: Melanie: INCORRECT; Jeremy: INCORRECT; Ana: CORRECT (1 Point); Question 3: Melanie: 10% (INCORRECT); Jeremy: 37% (CORRECT) (2 Points); Ana: 78% (INCORRECT); Question 4: Melanie: INCORRECT; Jeremy: CORRECT (3 Points); Ana: INCORRECT; Points: Melanie: 0; Jeremy: 6; Ana: 2; Round 2 (Nate's Score: Free Throws (60 sec.)): Jeremy: Over ($10,000); Ana: 8; Exact Score: 9; Round 3 (Bonus Round): Jeremy: ($10,000); Answers Correct: 4; Answers Incorrect: 3; Outcome: Melanie: Eliminated after the 4th question.; Jeremy: Got 4 questions right and 3 questions wrong in the Bonus Round and went home with $10,000.; Ana: Eliminated after Nate's Score.; Audience Prize (Bonus Round): Applebee's GCs; Contestants: Michael; Occupation: Army Vet; Location: Nevada; Bianca; Occupation: Candlemaker; Location: New York; Manny; Occupations: Realtor & Ironman Enthusiast; Location: Arizona; Round 1: Question 1: Michael: INCORRECT; Bianca: CORRECT (1 Point); Manny: INCORRECT; Question 2: Michael: CORRECT (1 Point); Bianca: INCORRECT; Manny: CORRECT (1 Point); Question 3: Michael: 20% (CORRECT) (2 Points); Bianca: 42% (INCORRECT); Manny: 30% (INCORRECT); Question 4: Michael: INCORRECT; Bianca: CORRECT (3 Points); Manny: INCORRECT; Points: Michael: 3; Bianca: 4; Manny: 1; Round 2 (Nate's Score: Sports Movies (60 sec.)): Michael: Under ($10,000); Bianca: 11; Exact Score: 6; Round 3 (Bonus Round): Michael: ($67,920); Answers Correct: 5; Answers Incorrect: 2; Outcome: Michael: Got 5 questions right and 2 questions wrong in the Bonus Round and went home with $67,920.; Bianca: Eliminated after Nate's Score.; Manny: Eliminated after the 4th question.; Audience Prize (Bonus Round): Red Vines
2	"Beefcakes!"	March 4, 2026	103	N/A	TBA
Episode 2 Results: Contestants: Darren; Location: Mississippi; Sade; Occupation: College Graduate; Location: Florida; Arjuna; Occupations: King of Halloween & Father of 3; Location: Kansas; Round 1: Question 1: Darren: INCORRECT; Sade: CORRECT (1 Point); Arjuna: INCORRECT; Question 2: Darren: 5% (INCORRECT); Sade: 10% (CORRECT) (2 Points); Arjuna: 60% (INCORRECT); Question 3: Darren: INCORRECT; Sade: INCORRECT; Arjuna: INCORRECT; Question 4 (Tiebreaker): Darren: 40% (CORRECT); Arjuna: 70% (INCORRECT); Points: Darren: 0; Sade: 3; Arjuna: 0; Round 2 (Nate's Score: Beefcakes (60 sec.)): Darren: 14; Sade: Under ($10,000); Exact Score: 6; Round 3 (Bonus Round): Sade: ($67,920); Answers Correct: 5; Answers Incorrect: 2; Outcome: Darren: Eliminated after Nate's Score.; Sade: Got 5 questions right and 2 questions wrong in the Bonus Round and went home with $67,920.; Arjuna: Eliminated after the 4th question.; Audience Prize (Bonus Round): Cinnabon; Contestants: Yolanda; Occupation: Nanny; Location: New York; Joseph; Occupation: Army Reserve Member; Location: Colorado; Laura; Occupation: Cowboy Hat Designer; Location: Texas; Round 1: Question 1: Yolanda: INCORRECT; Joseph: INCORRECT; Laura: INCORRECT; Question 2: Yolanda: 12% (INCORRECT); Joseph: 12% (INCORRECT); Laura: 43% (CORRECT) (1 Point); Question 3: Yolanda: CORRECT (2 Points); Joseph: INCORRECT; Laura: INCORRECT; Question 4: Yolanda: INCORRECT; Joseph: CORRECT (3 Points); Laura: INCORRECT; Points: Yolanda: 2; Joseph: 3; Laura: 1; Round 2 (Nate's Score: Mystery Munch (90 sec.)): Yolanda: 14; Joseph: Under ($10,000); Exact Score: 7; Round 3 (Bonus Round): Joseph: ($67,920); Answers Correct: 5; Answers Incorrect: 2; Outcome: Yolanda: Eliminated after Nate's Score.; Joseph: Got 5 questions right and 2 questions wrong in the Bonus Round and went home with $67,920.; Laura: Eliminated after the 4th question.; Audience Prize (Bonus Round): Crunch Fitness membership
3	"I Am Definitely NOT a Game Show Host!"	March 11, 2026	107	N/A	TBA
Episode 3 Results: Contestants: Courtney; Occupations: New Mom and University of Tennessee superfan; Location: Tennessee; Mark; Occupation: Steelworker; Location: Indiana; Brandon; Location: Connecticut; Round 1: Question 1: Courtney: INCORRECT; Mark: INCORRECT; Brandon: INCORRECT; Question 2: Courtney: 55% (CORRECT) (1 Point); Mark: 20% (INCORRECT); Brandon: 10% (INCORRECT); Question 3: Courtney: INCORRECT; Mark: INCORRECT; Brandon: INCORRECT; Question 4: Courtney: CORRECT (3 Points); Mark: INCORRECT; Brandon: INCORRECT; Question 5 (Tiebreaker): Mark: 65% (CORRECT); Brandon: 95% (INCORRECT); Points: Courtney: 4; Mark: 0; Brandon: 0; Round 2 (Nate's Score: NFL Teams (60 sec.)): Courtney: Under ($10,000); Mark: 25; Exact Score: 15; Round 3 (Bonus Round): Courtney: ($10,000); Answers Correct: 4; Answers Incorrect: 3; Outcome: Courtney: Got 4 questions right and 3 questions wrong in the Bonus Round and went home with $10,000.; Mark: Eliminated after Nate's Score.; Brandon: Eliminated after the 5th question.; Audience Prize (Bonus Round): 12 Cans of Bush's Baked Beans; Contestants: Christen; Occupation: 7th Grade Teacher; Location: Mississippi; John; Occupation: Retired Mail Carrier; Location: New York; Kelsie; Occupation: Ghost Tour Guide; Location: New Hampshire; Round 1: Question 1: Christen: CORRECT (1 Point); John: CORRECT (1 Point); Kelsie: INCORRECT; Question 2: Christen: INCORRECT; John: INCORRECT; Kelsie: INCORRECT; Question 3: Christen: 17%; John: 23%; Kelsie: 42% (CORRECT) (2 Points); Question 4 (Tiebreaker): Christen: 40%; John: 44% (CORRECT); Points: Christen: 1; John: 1; Kelsie: 2; Round 2 (Nate's Score: Back to School (90 sec.)): John: 9th Grade: Freshman; Kelsie: Under ($10,000); Exact Score: 1; Round 3 (Bonus Round): Kelsie: ($10,000); Answers Correct: 4; Answers Incorrect: 3; Outcome: Christen: Eliminated after the 4th question.; John: Eliminated after Nate's Score.; Kelsie: Got 4 questions right and 3 questions wrong in the Bonus Round and went home with $10,000.; Audience Prize (Bonus Round): Mel's Drive-In Gift Cards
4	"Armchair Legend"	March 18, 2026	102	N/A	TBA
Episode 4 Results: Contestants: Linda; Occupation: Retired Meteorologist; Location: Florida; Chris; Occupation: Former Delivery Driver; Location: Illinois; Kayla; Occupations: Fly-Fisher and Newlywed; Location: Minnesota; Round 1: Question 1: Linda: CORRECT (1 Point); Chris: CORRECT (1 Point); Kayla: CORRECT (1 Point); Question 2: Linda: 7% (INCORRECT); Chris: 38% (CORRECT) (1 Point); Kayla: 36% (INCORRECT); Question 3: Linda: INCORRECT; Chris: INCORRECT; Kayla: INCORRECT; Question 4: Linda: INCORRECT; Chris: INCORRECT; Kayla: CORRECT (3 Points); Points: Linda: 1; Chris: 2; Kayla: 4; Round 2 (Nate's Score: Armchair Quarterback (60 sec.)): Chris: 28; Kayla: Under ($10,000); Exact Score: 13; Round 3 (Bonus Round): Kayla: ($67,920); Answers Correct: 7; Answers Incorrect: N/A; Outcome: Linda: Eliminated after the 4th question.; Chris: Eliminated after Nate's Score.; Kayla: Got all 7 questions right in the Bonus Round and went home with $67,920.; Audience Prize (Bonus Round): Two Grand Ole Opry Backstage Tours; Contestants: Armani; Occupations: Auto Mechanic; Location: New York; Natalie; Occupation: Newlywed; Location: Missouri; Kevin; Occupations: Father of Three and Teacher; Location: Wisconsin; Round 1: Question 1: Armani: INCORRECT; Natalie: INCORRECT; Kevin: CORRECT (1 Point); Question 2: Armani: INCORRECT; Natalie: INCORRECT; Kevin: INCORRECT; Question 3: Armani: 38% (CORRECT) (2 Points); Natalie: 30% (CORRECT) (2 Points); Kevin: 55% (INCORRECT); Question 4: Armani: INCORRECT; Natalie: INCORRECT; Kevin: INCORRECT; Points: Armani: 2; Natalie: 2; Kevin: 1; Round 2 (Nate's Score: Best-Selling Musical Artists (60 sec.)): Armani: Under ($10,000); Natalie: 35; Exact Score: 7; Round 3 (Bonus Round): Armani: ($10,000); Answers Correct: 3; Answers Incorrect: 4; Outcome: Armani: Got 3 questions right and 4 questions wrong in the Bonus Round and went home with $10,000.; Natalie: Eliminated after Nate's Score.; Kevin: Eliminated after the 4th question.; Audience Prize (Bonus Round): Crumbl Cookies
5	"Golly, I Don't Know What's Going On!"	March 25, 2026	104	N/A	TBA
Episode 5 Results: Contestants: Bre; Occupation: Newlywed; Location: New York; Nick; Occupation: English Teacher; Location: Alabama; Miguel; Occupation: Surfer; Location: Oklahoma; Round 1: Question 1: Bre: CORRECT (1 Point); Nick: INCORRECT; Miguel: CORRECT (1 Point); Question 2: Bre: INCORRECT; Nick: CORRECT (1 Point); Miguel: INCORRECT; Question 3: Bre: 12% (INCORRECT); Nick: 45% (CORRECT) (2 Points); Miguel: 67% (INCORRECT); Question 4: Bre: INCORRECT; Nick: CORRECT (3 Points); Miguel: CORRECT (3 Points); Points: Bre: 1; Nick: 6; Miguel: 4; Round 2 (Nate's Score: Restaurant Chains (60 sec.)): Nick: Under ($10,000); Miguel: 27; Exact Score: 12; Round 3 (Bonus Round): Nick: ($67,920); Answers Correct: 5; Answers Incorrect: 2; Outcome: Bre: Eliminated after the 4th question.; Nick: Got 5 questions right and 2 questions wrong in the Bonus Round and went home with $67,920.; Miguel: Eliminated after Nate's Score.; Audience Prize (Bonus Round): Uncrustables; Contestants: Ryan; Occupation: 8th Grade Math Teacher; Location: Illinois; Danielle; Occupation: Stay-At-Home Mom; Location: New Jersey; Yvonne; Occupation: Housekeeper; Location: Nevada; Round 1: Question 1: Ryan: CORRECT (1 Point); Danielle: INCORRECT; Yvonne: INCORRECT; Question 2: Ryan: 52% (CORRECT) (1 Point); Danielle: 30% (INCORRECT); Yvonne: 26% (INCORRECT); Question 3: Ryan: INCORRECT; Danielle: INCORRECT; Yvonne: INCORRECT; Question 4: Ryan: CORRECT (3 Points); Danielle: INCORRECT; Yvonne: INCORRECT; Question 5 (Tiebreaker): Danielle: 67% (CORRECT); Yvonne: 56% (INCORRECT); Points: Ryan: 5; Danielle: 0; Yvonne: 0; Round 2 (Nate's Score: Home Run Derby (60 sec.)): Ryan: Over ($10,000); Danielle: 9; Exact Score: 14; Round 3 (Bonus Round): Ryan: ($67,920); Answers Correct: 7; Answers Incorrect: N/A; Outcome: Ryan: Got all 7 questions right in the Bonus Round and went home with $67,920.; Danielle: Eliminated after Nate's Score.; Yvonne: Eliminated after the 5th question.; Audience Prize (Bonus Round): Stouffer's Meals
6	"Staten Island is NOT a State!"	April 8, 2026 (Note: This episode was scheduled to air on April 1, 2026, but was replaced by a repeat of "At Least This is Not on TV", due to a presidential address by President Donald Trump.)	105	N/A	TBA
Episode 6 Results: Contestants: Montana; Occupations: Snowboard Champion; Location: Colorado; Frank; Occupations: Business Owner and Father of 5; Location: Florida; Ego'Obi; Occupations: Elementary School Teacher; Location: Texas; Round 1: Question 1: Montana: INCORRECT; Frank: INCORRECT; Ego'Obi: INCORRECT; Question 2: Montana: 70% (CORRECT) (1 Point); Frank: 76% (INCORRECT); Ego'Obi: 37% (INCORRECT); Question 3: Montana: INCORRECT; Frank: CORRECT (2 Points); Ego'Obi: INCORRECT; Question 4: Montana: INCORRECT; Frank: CORRECT (3 Points); Ego'Obi: INCORRECT; Points: Montana: 1; Frank: 5; Ego'Obi: 0; Round 2 (Nate's Score: Words That Start with the Letter... M (60 sec.)): Montana: 18 ($10,000); Frank: Over; Exact Score: 15; Round 3 (Bonus Round): Montana: ($67,920); Answers Correct: 5; Answers Incorrect: 2; Outcome: Montana: Got 5 questions right and 2 questions wrong in the Bonus Round and went home with $67,920.; Frank: Eliminated after Nate's Score.; Ego'Obi: Eliminated after the 4th question.; Audience Prize (Bonus Round): Hidden Valley Ranch; Contestants: Alex; Occupations: Recently Engaged Attorney; Location: Pennsylvania; Adrienne; Occupations: Marketing Coordinator and Mom; Location: Mississippi; Kerri; Occupations: Army Veteran; Location: Tennessee; Round 1: Question 1: Alex: CORRECT (1 Point); Adrienne: CORRECT (1 Point); Kerri: INCORRECT; Question 2: Alex: INCORRECT; Adrienne: CORRECT (1 Point); Kerri: INCORRECT; Question 3: Alex: 34% (CORRECT) (2 Points); Adrienne: 55% (INCORRECT); Kerri: 30% (INCORRECT); Question 4: Alex: INCORRECT; Adrienne: CORRECT (3 Points); Kerri: CORRECT (3 Points); Question 5 (Tiebreaker): Alex: 28% (CORRECT); Kerri: 25% (INCORRECT); Points: Alex: 3; Adrienne: 5; Kerri: 3; Round 2 (Nate's Score: Guess That State (90 sec.)): Alex: 12 ($10,000); Adrienne: Over; Exact Score: 11; Round 3 (Bonus Round): Alex: ($10,000); Answers Correct: 4; Answers Incorrect: 3; Outcome: Alex: Got 4 questions right and 3 questions wrong in the Bonus Round and went home with $10,000.; Adrienne: Eliminated after Nate's Score.; Kerri: Eliminated after the 5th question.; Audience Prize (Bonus Round): Raising Cane's Chicken Fingers
7	"Africa is NOT A Country!"	April 15, 2026	108	N/A	TBA
Episode 7 Results: Contestants: Josh; Occupation: College Opera Professor; Location: California; Riah; Occupation: Barista; Location: Arizona; Shawna; Occupations: Mom of Two and Emergency Communication Specialist; Location: Washington; Round 1: Question 1: Josh: CORRECT (1 Point); Riah: INCORRECT; Shawna: INCORRECT; Question 2: Josh: INCORRECT; Riah: INCORRECT; Shawna: INCORRECT; Question 3: Josh: 9% (INCORRECT); Riah: 38% (CORRECT) (2 Points); Shawna: 18% (INCORRECT); Question 4: Josh: INCORRECT; Riah: INCORRECT; Shawna: INCORRECT; Points: Josh: 1; Riah: 2; Shawna: 0; Round 2 (Nate's Score: Break-A-Plate (60 sec.)): Josh: 7; Riah: Over ($10,000); Exact Score: 17; Round 3 (Bonus Round): Riah: ($10,000); Answers Correct: 4; Answers Incorrect: 3; Outcome: Josh: Eliminated after Nate's Score.; Riah: Got 4 questions right and 3 questions wrong in the Bonus Round and went home with $10,000.; Shawna: Eliminated after the 4th question.; Audience Prize (Bonus Round): Waffle House; Contestants: Issac; Occupation: Real Estate Agent; Location: Kansas; Sammie; Occupations: Law Firm Appeals Specialist and Backstreet Boys Superfan; Location: New Jersey; Kenny; Occupations: Firefighter and Father of Two; Location: New York; Round 1: Question 1: Issac: INCORRECT; Sammie: INCORRECT; Kenny: CORRECT (1 Point); Question 2: Issac: 32% (INCORRECT); Sammie: 67% (CORRECT) (1 Point); Kenny: 8% (INCORRECT); Question 3: Issac: CORRECT (2 Points); Sammie: CORRECT (2 Points); Kenny: CORRECT (2 Points); Question 4: Issac: INCORRECT; Sammie: CORRECT (3 Points); Kenny: CORRECT (3 Points); Points: Issac: 2; Sammie: 6; Kenny: 6; Round 2 (Nate's Score: Countries (60 sec.)): Sammie: Under ($10,000); Kenny: 20; Exact Score: 16; Round 3 (Bonus Round): Sammie: ($67,920); Answers Correct: 6; Answers Incorrect: 1; Outcome: Issac: Eliminated after the 4th question.; Sammie: Got 6 questions right and 1 question wrong in the Bonus Round and went home with $67,920.; Kenny: Eliminated after Nate's Score.; Audience Prize (Bonus Round): Tickets to the Country Music Hall of Fame and Museum
8	"The Nate Bargatze Shopping Cart Nestle!"	April 22, 2026	106	N/A	TBA
Episode 8 Results: Contestants: Mallory; Occupation: Construction Project Manager; Location: North Carolina; Tom; Occupation: Retired FBI Agent; Location: Illinois; Dakota; Occupation: Horseshoer; Location: Oregon; Round 1: Question 1: Mallory: INCORRECT; Tom: INCORRECT; Dakota: CORRECT (1 Point); Question 2: Mallory: 15% (INCORRECT); Tom: 85% (INCORRECT); Dakota: 47% (CORRECT) (1 Point); Question 3: Mallory: CORRECT (2 Points); Tom: INCORRECT; Dakota: INCORRECT; Question 4: Mallory: CORRECT (3 Points); Tom: CORRECT (3 Points); Dakota: INCORRECT; Points: Mallory: 5; Tom: 3; Dakota: 2; Round 2 (Nate's Score: Shopping Cart Corral): Mallory: Under; Tom: 6 ($10,000); Exact Score: 9; Round 3 (Bonus Round): Tom: ($67,920); Answers Correct: 6; Answers Incorrect: 1; Outcome: Mallory: Eliminated after Nate's Score.; Tom: Got 6 questions right and 1 question wrong in the Bonus Round and went home with $67,920.; Dakota: Eliminated after the 4th question.; Audience Prize (Bonus Round): Krispy Kreme Doughnuts; Contestants: Preston; Occupations: Restaurant Manager; Location: Missouri; Nashawn; Occupations: Flight Attendant turned Pilot; Location: Arizona; Gwen; Occupations: Insurance Agency Owner; Location: Wyoming; Round 1: Question 1: Preston: INCORRECT; Nashawn: INCORRECT; Gwen: INCORRECT; Question 2: Preston: CORRECT (1 Point); Nashawn: CORRECT (1 Point); Gwen: CORRECT (1 Point); Question 3: Preston: 87% (INCORRECT); Nashawn: 56% (INCORRECT); Gwen: 60% (CORRECT) (2 Points); Question 4: Preston: INCORRECT; Nashawn: INCORRECT; Gwen: INCORRECT; Question 5 (Tiebreaker): Preston: 7% (INCORRECT); Nashawn: 80% (CORRECT); Points: Preston: 1; Nashawn: 1; Gwen: 3; Round 2 (Nate's Score: Breakfast Cereals (60 sec.)): Nashawn: 8 ($10,000); Gwen: Unknown; Exact Score: 8; Round 3 (Bonus Round): Nashawn: ($67,920); Answers Correct: 5; Answers Incorrect: 2; Outcome: Preston: Eliminated after the 5th question.; Nashawn: Got 5 questions right and 2 questions wrong in the Bonus Round and went home with $67,920.; Gwen: Eliminated after Nate's Score.; Audience Prize (Bonus Round): Church's Texas Chicken
