= Kingnites =

Kingnites Temporal range: Late Wenlock–Late Ludlow, 427–423 Ma

Scientific classification
- Kingdom: Animalia
- Phylum: Annelida
- Clade: Pleistoannelida
- Subclass: Errantia
- Order: Eunicida
- Family: †Paulinitidae
- Genus: †Kingnites; Eriksson et al., 2012
- Species: †K. diamondi

Binomial name
- †Kingnites diamondi Eriksson et al., 2012

Genus of annelid worms

Kingnites is an extinct genus of polychaete worm from the Silurian (late Wenlock–late Ludlow epochs) of Gotland and Estonia. It is the largest Silurian member of Paulinitidae, a family of Paleozoic polychaetes which were probably ancestral to living eunicids (bobbit worms and kin). The sole species, Kingnites diamondi, references both its large size and heavy metal musician King Diamond.

The distinctively long and slender scolecodont jaw parts of Kingnites could reach 6 mm (0.24 in), and the worm's total length is estimated at around 50 cm (20 in). Kingnites is a rare component of shallow marine ecosystems, found in the Klinteberg Formation and Hemse Group of Gotland (late Wenlock–early Ludlow) and the Kuressaare Formation (late Ludlow) of Estonia.
