= Betrayal: Secrets & Lies =

2024 television documentary series

- Genre: Documentary
- Country of origin: United States
- No. of episodes: 7

Production
- Executive producers: Nancy Glass; Jon Hirsch; Conal Byrne; David Sloan
- Producer: Eileen Murphy
- Production companies: ABC News Studios; Glass Entertainment

Original release
- Network: ABC
- Release: March 29, 2026 – present

Betrayal: Secrets & Lies is an American eight-part television documentary series that premiered on ABC on March 29, 2026. Originally intended as a series exclusively for Hulu, the show became the de facto replacement for the 22nd season of The Bachelorette after it was pulled from air due to personal issues involving that season's intended star.

== Episodes ==
No.	Title	Original release date	Prod. code	U.S. viewers (millions)	Rating (18–49)
1	"Fertility Fraud"	March 29, 2026	105A	N/A	TBA
2	"Abuse & Alimony"	April 5, 2026	107A	N/A	TBA
3	"The Bible Study Kidnapper"	April 12, 2026	101A	N/A	TBA
4	"The New Year Intruder"	April 19, 2026	108A	N/A	TBA
5	"The Kentucky Conman"	April 26, 2026	102A	N/A	TBA
6	"Latter Day Lies"	May 5, 2026	104A	N/A	TBA
7	"Marked for Murder"	May 10, 2026	103A	N/A	TBA
8	"Dead Man Married"	May 17, 2026	106A	N/A	TBA
