= On Brand with Jimmy Fallon =

- Genre: Reality competition
- Created by: Jimmy Fallon; Brien Meagher; Rhett Bachner; Pip Wells; Kelly Powers
- Starring: Jimmy Fallon; Bozoma Saint John
- Country of origin: United States
- Original language: English
- No. of seasons: 1
- No. of episodes: 8

Original release
- Network: NBC
- Release: September 30 – October 31, 2025

On Brand with Jimmy Fallon is an American marketing competition reality television series broadcast on NBC from September 30 through October 31, 2025. The series starred late night host Jimmy Fallon and businesswoman Bozoma Saint John. Contestants competed to design advertising campaigns for brands such as Pillsbury, Southwest Airlines, and Dunkin', all of which were sponsors.

The series ran for eight episodes and was cancelled after one season.

== Episodes ==
No.	Title	Original release date
1	"10K Store Merch Drop"	September 30, 2025
2	"Billboard in the Sky"	October 3, 2025
3	"Fashion Capital Takeover"	October 7, 2025
4	"Diners, Drive-Ins, & Housewives"	October 10, 2025
5	"Super Bowl is the Holy Grail"	October 14, 2025
6	"Oh Boy, Doughboy"	October 17, 2025
7	"Jennifer Garner is Not Applying for a Job"	October 24, 2025
8	"Innovator of the Year"	October 31, 2025

== Concept ==
Fallon started a marketing firm called On Brand Agency. Contestants were recruited to staff the agency, creating pitches and campaigns for major brands. Saint John, a former chief marketing officer at Netflix, helped the contestants and critiqued their efforts. The agency's "clients" included Captain Morgan, Dunkin', KitchenAid, Marshalls, Pillsbury, Sonic Drive-In, Southwest Airlines, and Therabody.

The series was tied into Fallon's main show, The Tonight Show Starring Jimmy Fallon. Student and digital marketer Bianca Fernandez won the series' $100,000 cash prize, a feature in Adweek, a trip to Cannes Lions, and the title of Innovator of the Year for her pitch to Therabody.

== Release ==
Episodes aired inconsistently across different days and time slots, including Tuesday nights and Friday evenings. Movieweb reported that this schedule confused viewers, and ratings suffered as a result. The show had an average 0.16 demo rating and 1.668 million viewers, far behind its Tuesday night lead-in, The Voice, which averaged a 0.383 demo rating and 4.873 million viewers.

Critical reception was not kind. Cracked reviewer Tara Ariano asked, "What On Brand dares to wonder is, what if product placement was the whole show?" Joel Keller of Decider wrote, "We don’t think many effective campaigns are going to come out of On Brand With Jimmy Fallon, and it doesn’t help that Fallon adds little to the proceedings beyond being his usual goofy self."
