= Dirty Talk: When Daytime Talk Shows Ruled TV =

2026 television documentary series

- Genre: Documentary
- Directed by: Stephen J. Morrison
- Country of origin: United States
- No. of series: 1
- No. of episodes: 3

Production
- Executive producers: Stephen J. Morrison; Christian Thompson; Kurt Spenser; Sandra Young; Jason Ubaldi; David Sloan; Victoria Thompson
- Production companies: Radley Studios; ABC News Studios

Original release
- Network: ABC
- Release: January 14 – January 28, 2026

Dirty Talk: When Daytime Talk Shows Ruled TV is an American three-part television documentary series that premiered on ABC on January 14, 2026.

== Episodes ==
No.	Title	Original release date	Prod. code	U.S. viewers (millions)	Rating (18–49)
1	"Part 1: Origin of the Species"	January 14, 2026	101	N/A	TBA
2	"Part 2: Talked to Death"	January 21, 2026	102	N/A	TBA
3	"Part 3: Adapt or Die"	January 28, 2026	103	N/A	TBA
