= Harlan Coben's Final Twist =

2026 American television documentary series

- Also known as: Final Twist
- Genre: Documentary
- Presented by: Harlan Coben
- Country of origin: United States
- Original language: English
- No. of seasons: 2
- No. of episodes: 12

Production
- Executive producers: Harlan Coben; Ben Coben; Jeff Zimbalist; Stu Schreiberg; Susan Zirinsky; Terence Wrong; Jess Philipps
- Production companies: Final Twist Productions; All Rise Films; Triage Entertainment; See It Now Studios

Original release
- Network: CBS
- Release: January 7, 2026 – present

Harlan Coben's Final Twist, or simply Final Twist, is an American television documentary series that premiered on January 7, 2026 on CBS. It is hosted by Harlan Coben.

In April 2026, the series was renewed for a second season, which premiered on October 5, 2026.

== Episodes ==
=== Series overview ===
Season	Episodes	Originally released		Rank	Viewers (millions)
Season	Episodes	First released	Last released	Rank	Viewers (millions)
1	5	January 7, 2026	February 3, 2026	TBA	TBA
2	TBA	October 5, 2026	TBA	TBA	TBA

=== Season 1 (2026) ===
No. overall	No. in season	Title	Original release date	Prod. code	U.S. viewers (millions)	Rating/share (18-49)
1	1	"Billy & Billie Jean"	January 7, 2026	101	N/A	TBA
2	2	"Gambler's Debt"	January 13, 2026	102	N/A	TBA
3	3	"No Sign of Nancy"	January 20, 2026	103	N/A	TBA
4	4	"Who Killed Joy?"	January 27, 2026	104	N/A	TBA
5	5	"Shot in the Dark"	February 3, 2026	105	N/A	TBA

=== Season 2 (2026) ===
No. overall	No. in season	Title	Original release date	Prod. code	U.S. viewers (millions)	Rating/share (18-49)
6	1	"Betsy's Trust"	October 5, 2026	201	2.03	0.14/2
7	2	"A Mother's Crusade"	October 12, 2026	203	N/A	TBA
8	3	"Camilo's Secret"	October 19, 2026	202	N/A	TBA
9	4	"A Recipe for Murder"	October 26, 2026	204	TBD	TBA
10	5	"Caught On Camera"	November 2, 2026	205	TBD	TBA
11	6	"State Secrets"	November 9, 2026	206	TBD	TBA
12	7	"Blood in the Ozarks"	November 16, 2026	207	TBD	TBA
13	8	"Trouble in the Panhandle"	November 30, 2026	208	TBD	TBA
14	9	"Last Seen Online"	December 7, 2026	209	TBD	TBA
15	10	"Too Close to Home"	December 14, 2026	210	TBD	TBA
