= 2023–24 United States network television schedule =

Television schedule for the fall of 2023

The 2023–24 network television schedule for the five major English-language commercial broadcast networks that air in the United States covers the prime time hours from September 2023 to August 2024. The schedule is followed by a list per network of returning series, new series, and series canceled after the 2022–23 television season. The schedule was affected by strikes undertaken by the Writers Guild of America (which began on May 2 and ended on September 27) and SAG-AFTRA (which began on July 14 and ended on November 9). Programming impacts on the 2023–24 season itself were limited in comparison to previous television seasons affected by Hollywood labor disputes.

CBS was the first to announce its initial fall schedule on May 10, 2023, via press release (without an upfront presentation). However, as a result of the ongoing strikes, a revised schedule for CBS was released on July 17 (with its premiere dates announced on August 3). This was followed by NBC, which also announced its initial schedule on May 12 (with their upfront presentation at 11 a.m. Eastern Time on May 15), but later announced its revised schedule on July 19 and August 29 (along with the premiere dates), and ABC which announced its initial schedule on May 16 (with their upfront presentation at 4 p.m. that day) but later announced part of its revised schedule (along with its premiere dates on August 21), with its Tuesday and Monday schedule (along with its premiere dates) on September 12 and 18 respectively. The CW announced its initial fall schedule on May 18 (their upfront presentation of the original schedule was held at 11 a.m. that day), before it was revised on June 6 with the release of its summer schedule for the previous season, and its replacement programming was announced on July 12 (along with their premiere dates). Fox announced its programming on May 15 via press release that morning (with their upfront presentation at 4 p.m. that day), but released its Sunday schedule (along with its release dates) on July 10, along with the rest of its prime-time schedule (which was revised due to the strike, however its original schedule wasn't announced) (with their premiere dates) on July 11.

This would be the first season that CBS News and Stations disaffiliated from The CW, as Paramount announced on May 5, 2023, that it would exercise the right with the transaction to disaffiliate all eight of their CW affiliates on September 1, 2023. As a result, this would be the first season that Nexstar Media Group would be majority owner of The CW, acquiring a 75-percent ownership stake; former joint owners Paramount Global and Warner Bros. Discovery retained a 25-percent stake, split at nominal 12.5-percent stakes for both companies.

PBS is not included, as member television stations have local flexibility over most of their schedule and broadcast times for network shows may vary. Ion Television and MyNetworkTV are also not included since both networks' schedules consist of syndicated reruns (with limited original programming).

Each of the 30 highest-rated shows released in May 2024 is listed with their ranks and ratings as determined by Nielsen Media Research.

Beginning this season, The CW began airing programming during the first hour of prime-time on Sundays.

== Impact of the 2023 Writers Guild of America and SAG-AFTRA strikes ==
On May 2, the Writers Guild of America went on strike, followed by SAG-AFTRA on July 13. The absence of working writers and actors through the summer led to scripted television production being shut down completely. The Writers Guild of America strike ended on September 27, while the SAG-AFTRA strike ended on November 9.

Network schedules were heavily altered in response to these strikes. The vast majority of new or returning live-action scripted series on the broadcast networks were delayed, pushing their premieres until 2024. Sports, reality shows, and game shows filled many time slots as SAG-AFTRA members were permitted to work on such productions during the strike.

In other moves to work around the strikes, NBC delayed drama series Found, which was originally intended to air as a mid-season replacement in the 2022–23 season, to fall 2023, while also fast-tracking the production of other scripted series such as the second season (of the revival, seventh overall) of Quantum Leap and the premiere season of The Irrational.

CBS aired series originally produced for sister properties, including Yellowstone (Paramount Network), Paramount+ shows SEAL Team (which originated on CBS) and FBI True, and NCIS: Sydney, an Australian spin-off of NCIS originally intended for Paramount+ and Network 10 before being added to the CBS schedule as well. Episodes of Ghosts, the BBC series on which the American adaptation was based, have also been added to the CBS schedule. Later in November, CBS announced that Matlock (a reboot of the original 1980s series with a female lead), originally scheduled to air Sundays at 8 p.m., was forced to be moved to next season due to production delays.

ABC aired additional sports coverage sourced from sister network ESPN. In the fall, ABC added 10 Monday Night Football games in simulcast with ESPN, on top of the seven simulcast or exclusive games previously scheduled. In January 2024, ABC aired five NBA games on Wednesday nights that were originally scheduled to air on ESPN.

Fox stacked their schedule with unscripted series from Monday through Thursday nights, its Friday night (WWE SmackDown) and weekend sports programming was not affected. Its Sunday night animation lineup was also unaffected due to the long lead times required to produce such series. The CW is likewise relying more on unscripted programming as well as international acquisitions, though network executives stated that this was a long-term strategy shift following its acquisition by Nexstar rather than a specific reaction to the strike.

As a result of the strikes, the 2023–24 season was the most recent instance of a delay to the start of the television season due to issues beyond the control of the major television networks; delayed starts previously occurred in 1988–89 (due to the 1988 Writers Guild of America strike), 2001–02 (due to the September 11 attacks), and 2020–21 (due to the suspension of television productions that was caused by the COVID-19 pandemic).

== Legend ==
- Light blue indicates local programming.
- Gray indicates encore programming.
- Blue-gray indicates news programming.
- Light green indicates sporting events.
- Red indicates series being burned off and other irregularly scheduled programs, including specials and movies.
- Light gold indicates programming produced outside of the United States.
- Bronze indicates reruns of programming that originally aired on a cable channel or streaming service (or new episodes of a streaming service original).
- highlight Yellow highlights indicates the top-10 most watched programs of the season.
- highlight Cyan highlights indicates numbers 11-20 most watched programs of the season.
- highlight Magenta highlights indicates numbers 21-30 most watched programs of the season.
- highlight Highlights indicates that it falls in multiple of the above categories.

== Sunday ==
Network		7:00 p.m.	7:30 p.m.	8:00 p.m.	8:30 p.m.	9:00 p.m.	9:30 p.m.	10:00 p.m.	10:30 p.m.
ABC	Fall	America's Funniest Home Videos (Note: On select weeks when repeats of America's Funniest Home Videos air at 8 p.m., The Wonderful World of Disney will air at 9 p.m.)		The Wonderful World of Disney (Note: On select weeks, The Wonderful World of Disney airs 3 hours of movies at 8 p.m., thus no other programming will air in the 10 p.m. hour (a half hour of programming will air if the movie is 2.5 hours long).)				The Great Christmas Light Fight	
ABC	Winter	America's Funniest Home Videos		American Idol				What Would You Do?	
ABC	Spring	America's Funniest Home Videos (R)				The Wonderful World of Disney			
CBS	Fall	NFL on CBS (4:25 p.m.)	60 Minutes (9/8.27)			Yellowstone (R)		Big Brother	
CBS	Mid-fall	NFL on CBS (4:25 p.m.)	60 Minutes (9/8.27)			Yellowstone (R)			
CBS	Winter	60 Minutes (9/8.27)		Yellowstone (R)					
CBS	Mid-winter	60 Minutes (9/8.27)		The Equalizer (13/7.90)		Tracker (3/10.80)		CSI: Vegas (28/6.15)	
CBS	Spring	60 Minutes (R)				Elsbeth (R)			
CBS	Summer	60 Minutes (R)		Tulsa King (R)		Big Brother		Tracker (R)	
The CW	Fall	Sullivan's Crossing (R)		The Chosen (R) (Note: On select weeks when The Chosen airs regular 60-minute episodes at 8 p.m., an additional episode of World's Funniest Animals will air at 9 p.m. on top of its regular 9:30 p.m. airing.) (Note: On select weeks when The Chosen airs regular 60-minute episodes at 8 p.m., an additional episode of Whose Line Is It Anyway? will air at 9 p.m. on top of its regular 9:30 p.m. airing.) (Note: On select weeks, The Chosen airs 120-minute episodes at 8 p.m., thus no other programming will air in the 9 p.m. hour.)			World's Funniest Animals (R)	Local programming	
The CW	Mid-fall	Sullivan's Crossing (R)		The Chosen (R)			Whose Line Is It Anyway? (R)	Local programming	
The CW	Winter	The CW Sunday Night Movie (Note: On select weeks, The CW Sunday Night Movie airs 3 hours of movies at 7 p.m., thus no other programming will air in the 9 p.m. hour.)					The Conners (R) (Note: If The CW Sunday Night Movie is only 2 hours long, an additional episode of The Conners will air at 9 p.m. on top of its original 9:30 p.m. airing.)	Local programming	
Fox	Fall	Fox NFL (4:25 p.m.)	The OT	The Simpsons	Krapopolis	Bob's Burgers	Family Guy	Local programming	
Fox	Winter	Next Level Chef (R)		The Simpsons	Krapopolis	The Great North	Grimsburg	Local programming	
Fox	Spring	Fox Sports programming						Local programming	
Fox	Summer	MasterChef (R)		Krapopolis (R)				Local programming	
NBC	Fall	Football Night in America		NBC Sunday Night Football (8:20 p.m.) (1/19.84)					
NBC	Winter	America's Got Talent: Fantasy League (R)				Dateline Weekend Mystery			
NBC	Late winter	Weakest Link (R)		The Voice (R)				Dateline Weekend Mystery	
NBC	Summer	NBC Sports programming							

== Monday ==
Network		8:00 p.m.	8:30 p.m.	9:00 p.m.	9:30 p.m.	10:00 p.m.	10:30 p.m.
ABC	Fall	Monday Night Countdown (7:30 p.m.)	Monday Night Football (8:15 p.m.) (2/11.99)				
ABC	Winter	The Bachelor				Bad Romance: A Special Edition of 20/20	
ABC	Spring	American Idol				The Interrogation Tapes: A Special Edition of 20/20	
ABC	Mid-spring	Jeopardy! Masters		Celebrity Wheel of Fortune		Press Your Luck (R)	
ABC	Late spring	ESPN on ABC sports programming					
ABC	Summer	The Bachelorette				Celebrity Family Feud (R)	
CBS	Fall	The Price Is Right at Night		Lotería Loca		NCIS (R)	
CBS	Mid-fall	The Price Is Right at Night		Let's Make a Deal Primetime		NCIS (R)	
CBS	Early winter	NCIS (R)					
CBS	Winter	The Neighborhood (R)	Bob Hearts Abishola (R)	Yellowstone (R)			
CBS	Mid-winter	The Neighborhood	Bob Hearts Abishola	NCIS (4/9.66)		NCIS: Hawai'i (14/7.79)	
CBS	Spring	The Neighborhood (R)		NCIS (4/9.66)		NCIS: Hawai'i (14/7.79)	
CBS	Summer	NCIS (R)		NCIS: Sydney (R)		NCIS: Hawai'i (14/7.79)	
The CW	Fall	Penn & Teller: Fool Us (R)		Masters of Illusion	World's Funniest Animals	Local programming	
The CW	Winter	Ride (R)		Wild Cards (R)		Local programming	
The CW	Spring	All American		Whose Line Is It Anyway? (R)		Local programming	
The CW	Summer	All American: Homecoming		61st Street		Local programming	
Fox	Fall	Kitchen Nightmares		Special Forces: World's Toughest Test		Local programming	
Fox	Winter	America's Most Wanted		TMZ Investigates		Local programming	
Fox	Late winter	MasterChef Junior		So You Think You Can Dance		Local programming	
Fox	Spring	Name That Tune		The 1% Club (R)		Local programming	
NBC	Fall	The Voice (19/7.14)				The Irrational (30/5.93)	
NBC	Winter	America's Got Talent: Fantasy League				The Irrational (30/5.93)	
NBC	Late winter	The Voice (19/7.14)				Deal or No Deal Island	
NBC	Spring	American Ninja Warrior				Weakest Link	
NBC	Summer	American Ninja Warrior				The Wall	

== Tuesday ==
Network		8:00 p.m.	8:30 p.m.	9:00 p.m.	9:30 p.m.	10:00 p.m.	10:30 p.m.
ABC	Fall	Dancing with the Stars				Press Your Luck	
ABC	Late fall	Various programming		The Great Christmas Light Fight			
ABC	Winter	Celebrity Jeopardy!		Only Murders in the Building (R)			
ABC	Late winter	Will Trent (23/6.74)		The Rookie		The Good Doctor	
ABC	Spring	Celebrity Wheel of Fortune (R)		Celebrity Jeopardy! (R)		The $100,000 Pyramid (R)	
ABC	Summer	Celebrity Family Feud		Judge Steve Harvey		What Would You Do? (R)	
CBS	Fall	Big Brother		FBI True (R)		FBI (R)	
CBS	Mid-fall	NCIS: Sydney (24/6.53)		Various programming		FBI True	
CBS	Winter	FBI (6/8.96)		FBI: International (18/7.21)		FBI: Most Wanted (16/7.39)	
The CW	Fall	Inside the NFL		The Swarm		Local programming	
The CW	Mid-fall	Inside the NFL		Whose Line Is It Anyway?	Whose Line Is It Anyway? (R)	Local programming	
The CW	Winter	Crime Nation				Local programming	
The CW	Spring	Police 24/7		Hostage Rescue		Local programming	
The CW	Summer	The Conners (R)				Local programming	
Fox	Fall	Celebrity Name That Tune		9-1-1: Lone Star (R)		Local programming	
Fox	Winter	Celebrity Name That Tune		The Floor		Local programming	
Fox	Late winter	The Cleaning Lady		Alert: Missing Persons Unit		Local programming	
Fox	Spring	Beat Shazam		The Quiz with Balls		Local programming	
NBC	Fall	The Voice (R)		The Voice (21/6.89)		Found	
NBC	Winter	Night Court	Extended Family	La Brea		Found	
NBC	Mid-winter	Night Court	Extended Family	La Brea		Quantum Leap	
NBC	Late winter	Night Court	Extended Family	The Voice (21/6.89)		Password	
NBC	Spring	Lopez vs Lopez		Weakest Link		Password	
NBC	Mid-spring	The Voice (21/6.89)		Weakest Link		Password	
NBC	Late spring	America's Got Talent				Password	

== Wednesday ==
Network		8:00 p.m.	8:30 p.m.	9:00 p.m.	9:30 p.m.	10:00 p.m.	10:30 p.m.
ABC	Fall	Celebrity Jeopardy!		Celebrity Wheel of Fortune		The $100,000 Pyramid	
ABC	Winter	NBA Countdown	NBA Wednesday on ABC				
ABC	Mid-winter	The Conners	Not Dead Yet	Abbott Elementary	Celebrity Family Feud (R)	Judge Steve Harvey	
ABC	Spring	The Conners	Not Dead Yet	Abbott Elementary	The $100,000 Pyramid (R)		
ABC	Mid-spring	Jeopardy! Masters		Abbott Elementary	The Conners	The $100,000 Pyramid (R)	
ABC	Late spring	Various programming				Shark Tank (R)	
ABC	Summer	Who Wants to Be a Millionaire		Claim to Fame		Shark Tank (R)	
CBS	Fall	Survivor (25/6.50)			The Amazing Race		
CBS	Winter	The Price Is Right at Night		Raid the Cage		FBI True	
CBS	Mid-winter	The Price Is Right at Night		Let's Make a Deal Primetime		FBI True	
CBS	Late winter	Survivor (25/6.50)			The Amazing Race		
CBS	Spring	The Price Is Right at Night (R)		Let's Make a Deal Primetime (R)		Tracker (R)	
CBS	Summer	The Price Is Right at Night (R)		Let's Make a Deal Primetime (R)		The Real CSI: Miami	
CBS	Mid-summer	Big Brother		The Real CSI: Miami		Tracker (R)	
The CW	Early fall	The Swarm (R)		Penn & Teller: Fool Us (R)		Local programming	
The CW	Fall	Sullivan's Crossing		The Spencer Sisters		Local programming	
The CW	Winter	Wild Cards		Family Law		Local programming	
The CW	Spring	Walker		Sight Unseen		Local programming	
The CW	Late spring	Walker		Wild Cards (R)		Local programming	
The CW	Summer	Sullivan's Crossing (R)		Wild Cards (R)		Local programming	
The CW	Late summer	Sullivan's Crossing (R)		Police 24/7 (R)		Local programming	
Fox	Fall	The Masked Singer		Snake Oil		Local programming	
Fox	Winter	I Can See Your Voice		We Are Family		Local programming	
Fox	Late winter	The Masked Singer		Animal Control	Family Guy	Local programming	
Fox	Spring	MasterChef		Gordon Ramsay's Food Stars		Local programming	
Fox	Summer	MasterChef				Local programming	
NBC	Fall	Quantum Leap		Magnum P.I.		Chicago Fire (R)	
NBC	Mid-fall	Quantum Leap		Magnum P.I.		Chicago P.D. (R)	
NBC	Winter	Chicago Med (11/8.20)		Chicago Fire (7/8.79)		Chicago P.D. (12/7.96)	
NBC	Summer	America's Got Talent		Chicago Fire (7/8.79)		Chicago P.D. (12/7.96)	

== Thursday ==
Network		8:00 p.m.	8:30 p.m.	9:00 p.m.	9:30 p.m.	10:00 p.m.	10:30 p.m.
ABC	Fall	The Golden Bachelor (29/5.94)		Bachelor in Paradise			
ABC	Winter	Press Your Luck		Press Your Luck (R)			
ABC	Mid-winter	Various programming				Will Trent (R)	
ABC	Late winter	9-1-1 (22/6.86)		Grey's Anatomy		Station 19	
ABC	Summer	Press Your Luck		Lucky 13		Who Wants to Be a Millionaire (R)	
CBS	Fall	Buddy Games		Big Brother		The Challenge: USA	
CBS	Mid-fall	Young Sheldon (R)	Ghosts (USA) (R)	Ghosts (UK) (R)		SEAL Team (R)	
CBS	Winter	Young Sheldon (5/9.10)	Ghosts (USA) (10/8.21)	So Help Me Todd (26/6.18)		Elsbeth (15/7.45)	
CBS	Spring	Young Sheldon (5/9.10)	Ghosts (USA) (10/8.21)	Elsbeth (R)		Fire Country (R)	
CBS	Summer	Big Brother		Young Sheldon (R)	Ghosts (USA) (R)	Fire Country (R)	
CBS	Late summer	Big Brother		Young Sheldon (R)	Ghosts (USA) (R)	Elsbeth (R)	
The CW	Fall	Son of a Critch	Run the Burbs	Children Ruin Everything (R)	Everyone Else Burns	Local programming	
The CW	Mid-fall	Son of a Critch	Children Ruin Everything (R)	Whose Line Is It Anyway? (R)	The Great American Joke Off (R)	Local programming	
The CW	Winter	Son of a Critch	The Conners (R)		Children Ruin Everything	Local programming	
The CW	Mid-winter	The Conners (R)		Son of a Critch	Children Ruin Everything	Local programming	
The CW	Spring	The Conners (R)		Son of a Critch		Local programming	
The CW	Mid-spring	Patti Stanger: The Matchmaker		Lovers and Liars		Local programming	
The CW	Late spring	Patti Stanger: The Matchmaker		Police 24/7 (R)		Local programming	
The CW	Summer	The Conners (R)		Masters of Illusion	World's Funniest Animals	Local programming	
Fox	Fall	Hell's Kitchen		Lego Masters		Local programming	
Fox	Winter	Next Level Chef		Farmer Wants a Wife		Local programming	
Fox	Spring	I Can See Your Voice		Don't Forget the Lyrics!		Local programming	
Fox	Summer	Don't Forget the Lyrics!				Local programming	
Fox	Late summer	Fox Sports programming				Local programming	
NBC	Fall	Law & Order: Special Victims Unit (R)		Transplant		Dateline NBC	
NBC	Mid-fall	Law & Order (R)		Transplant		Dateline NBC	
NBC	Winter	Law & Order		Law & Order: Special Victims Unit (20/6.91)		Law & Order: Organized Crime	

== Friday ==
Network		8:00 p.m.	8:30 p.m.	9:00 p.m.	9:30 p.m.	10:00 p.m.	10:30 p.m.
ABC	Fall	Shark Tank		20/20			
ABC	Summer	Jeopardy! Masters (R)		20/20			
CBS	Fall	The Price Is Right at Night		Raid the Cage		Blue Bloods (R)	
CBS	Mid-fall	Let's Make a Deal Primetime		Raid the Cage		Blue Bloods (R)	
CBS	Winter	S.W.A.T. (27/6.17)		Fire Country (17/7.33)		Blue Bloods (8/8.45)	
CBS	Spring	Lingo		S.W.A.T. (R)		Blue Bloods (8/8.45)	
CBS	Summer	Let's Make a Deal Primetime		Lingo		Blue Bloods (8/8.45)	
The CW	Fall	Penn & Teller: Fool Us		FBOY Island		Local programming	
The CW	Winter	Penn & Teller: Fool Us		Masters of Illusion	World's Funniest Animals	Local programming	
The CW	Late winter	Penn & Teller: Fool Us		Totally Funny Animals	Totally Funny Kids	Local programming	
The CW	Spring	Penn & Teller: Fool Us		100 Days to Indy		Local programming	
The CW	Late spring	The Big Bakeover		Totally Funny Animals	Totally Funny Kids	Local programming	
The CW	Summer	The Conners (R)		Totally Funny Animals	Totally Funny Kids	Local programming	
Fox		WWE Friday Night SmackDown				Local programming	
NBC	Fall	The Wall		Dateline NBC			
NBC	Winter	Transplant		Dateline NBC			
NBC	Mid-winter	Password (R)		Dateline NBC			
NBC	Spring	Night Court (R)		Dateline NBC			
NBC	Summer	NBC Sports programming					
NBC	Late summer	America's Got Talent (R)				Dateline NBC	

== Saturday ==
Network		8:00 p.m.	8:30 p.m.	9:00 p.m.	9:30 p.m.	10:00 p.m.	10:30 p.m.
ABC	Fall	ESPN Saturday Night Football on ABC (7:30 p.m.)					
ABC	Winter	NBA Countdown	ESPN NBA Saturday Primetime on ABC				
ABC	Spring	ESPN on ABC sports programming					
ABC	Summer	Shark Tank (R)					
ABC	Mid-summer	Will Trent (R)					
CBS	Early fall	College Football on CBS (7:30 p.m.)					
CBS	Fall	Crimetime Saturday				48 Hours	
CBS	Spring	Crimetime Saturday		48 Hours (R)			
The CW	Fall	ACC Football on The CW (6:30 p.m.)				Local programming	
The CW	Mid-fall	The CW Saturday Night Movie				Local programming	
The CW	Winter	I Am (R)				Local programming	
The CW	Mid-winter	ACC Basketball on The CW (7:45 p.m.)				Local programming	
The CW	Spring	I Am (R)				Local programming	
The CW	Late spring	The Conners (R)				Local programming	
The CW	Summer	Crime Nation (R)				Local programming	
Fox	Fall	Fox College Football (continued to game completion)					
Fox	Winter	Fox Primetime Hoops				Local programming	
Fox	Spring	UFL on Fox (7:00 p.m.)				Local programming	
Fox	Mid-spring	Baseball Night in America (7:00 p.m.)				Local programming	
NBC	Fall	College Football on NBC (Note: Branded as Big Ten Saturday Night or Notre Dame Football on NBC depending on conference game being broadcast.) (7:30 p.m.)					
NBC	Late fall	Various programming		Dateline Weekend Mystery		Saturday Night Live (R)	
NBC	Winter	The Wall (R)		Weakest Link (R)		Saturday Night Live (R)	
NBC	Spring	The Wall (R)		Weakest Link (R)		Dateline Weekend Mystery	
NBC	Summer	NBC Sports programming					

== By network ==
Note:

- Series that originally intended to air this season but are delayed to a later TV season due to the 2023 Writers Guild of America strike are indicated using †.
- Series that originally intended to air this season but are delayed to a later TV season due to the 2023 SAG-AFTRA strike are indicated using‡.

=== ABC ===
Returning series:

- The $100,000 Pyramid
- 20/20
- 9-1-1 (moved from Fox)
- Abbott Elementary
- ABC Hockey Saturday
- American Idol
- America's Funniest Home Videos
- The Bachelor
- Bachelor in Paradise
- The Bachelorette
- Celebrity Family Feud
- Celebrity Jeopardy!
- Celebrity Wheel of Fortune
- Claim to Fame
- The Conners (first-run episodes)
- Dancing with the Stars (shared with Disney+)
- The Good Doctor
- Grey's Anatomy
- The Great Christmas Light Fight
- Jeopardy! Masters
- Judge Steve Harvey
- Monday Night Countdown
- Monday Night Football
- NBA Countdown
- NBA Saturday Primetime
- Not Dead Yet
- Press Your Luck
- The Rookie
- Saturday Night Football
- Shark Tank
- Station 19
- What Would You Do? (Note: Series revival; previously aired on ABC from 2008 to 2020.)
- Who Wants to Be a Millionaire
- Will Trent
- The Wonderful World of Disney

New series:

- Bad Romance: A Special Edition of 20/20
- ESPN NBA Wednesday
- The Golden Bachelor
- The Interrogation Tapes: A Special Edition of 20/20
- Lucky 13
- Only Murders in the Building (Note: American broadcast television premiere; a Hulu original series.)

Not returning from 2022–23:

- Alaska Daily
- Big Sky
- The Company You Keep
- The Game Show Show
- Generation Gap
- The Goldbergs
- Home Economics
- A Million Little Things
- The Parent Test
- The Rookie: Feds
- The Wonder Years

=== CBS ===
Returning series:

- 48 Hours
- 60 Minutes
- The Amazing Race
- Big Brother
- Blue Bloods
- Bob Hearts Abishola
- The Challenge: USA
- College Football on CBS
- CSI: Vegas
- The Equalizer
- FBI
- FBI: International
- FBI: Most Wanted
- FBI True (moved from Paramount+)
- Fire Country
- Ghosts (USA)
- Lingo
- NCIS
- NCIS: Hawaiʻi
- The Neighborhood
- NFL on CBS
- SEAL Team (Note: A Paramount+ original series; previously aired on CBS from 2017 to 2021.)
- So Help Me Todd
- Survivor
- S.W.A.T.
- Young Sheldon

New series:

- Big Brother Reindeer Games
- Buddy Games
- Elsbeth
- Ghosts (UK) (Note: American linear television premiere; previously made available to stream in the United States on Max.)
- Lotería Loca
- NCIS: Sydney
- Raid the Cage
- The Real CSI: Miami
- Tracker
- Tulsa King (Note: American broadcast television premiere; a Paramount+ original series.)
- Yellowstone (Note: A Paramount Network original series; airs repeats.)

Not returning from 2022–23:

- East New York
- NCIS: Los Angeles
- The Real Love Boat (burned off on Paramount+)
- Tough as Nails
- True Lies

=== The CW ===
Returning series:

- 100 Days to Indy
- 61st Street (moved from AMC)
- ACC on The CW (moved from Bally Sports)
- All American
- All American: Homecoming
- Children Ruin Everything
- The Chosen (reruns)
- The Conners (reruns) (Note: An ABC original series; airs repeats.)
- Family Law
- FBOY Island (moved from HBO Max)
- The Great American Joke Off (reruns)
- Inside the NFL (moved from Paramount+)
- Masters of Illusion
- Penn & Teller: Fool Us
- Run the Burbs
- Son of a Critch
- Walker
- Whose Line Is It Anyway?
- World's Funniest Animals

New series:

- The Big Bakeover
- The CW Sunday Night Movie
- The CW Saturday Night Movie
- Crime Nation
- Everyone Else Burns
- Hostage Rescue
- I Am (Note: American broadcast television premiere; films previously aired on Paramount Network.)
- Lovers and Liars
- Patti Stanger: The Matchmaker
- Police 24/7
- Ride (Note: American broadcast television premiere; a Hallmark Channel original series.)
- Sight Unseen
- The Spencer Sisters
- Sullivan's Crossing
- The Swarm
- Totally Funny Animals
- Totally Funny Kids
- Wild Cards

Not returning from 2022–23:

- Barons (burned off on The CW app)
- Bump (burned off on The CW app)
- Down to Earth with Zac Efron (burned off on The CW app)
- Fantastic Friends (burned off on The CW app)
- The Flash
- Gotham Knights
- Greatest Geek Year Ever: 1982
- Kung Fu
- Nancy Drew
- Professionals
- Recipe for Disaster (burned off on The CW app)
- The Rising
- Riverdale
- Stargirl
- Superman & Lois (returned for 2024–25)‡
- Walker: Independence
- The Winchesters

=== Fox ===
Returning series:

- Alert: Missing Persons Unit
- America's Most Wanted
- Animal Control
- Baseball Night in America
- Beat Shazam
- Bob's Burgers
- Celebrity Name That Tune
- The Cleaning Lady
- Don't Forget the Lyrics!
- Family Guy
- Farmer Wants a Wife
- Fox College Football
- Fox College Hoops
- Gordon Ramsay's Food Stars
- The Great North
- Hell's Kitchen
- I Can See Your Voice
- Kitchen Nightmares (Note: Series revival; previously aired on Fox from 2007 to 2014.)
- Lego Masters
- Lego Masters: Celebrity Holiday Bricktacular
- The Masked Singer
- MasterChef
- MasterChef Junior
- Next Level Chef
- NFL on Fox
- The OT
- The Simpsons
- So You Think You Can Dance
- Special Forces: World's Toughest Test
- TMZ Investigates
- WWE SmackDown

New series:

- The 1% Club (shared with Amazon Prime Video)
- The Floor
- Grimsburg
- Krapopolis
- The Quiz with Balls
- Snake Oil
- UFL on Fox
- We Are Family

Not returning from 2022–23:

- 9-1-1 (moved to ABC)
- 9-1-1: Lone Star (returned for 2024–25)‡
- Accused (returned for 2024–25)‡
- Call Me Kat
- Crime Scene Kitchen (returning for 2024–25)
- Fantasy Island
- HouseBroken
- Monarch
- The Resident
- Welcome to Flatch

=== NBC ===
Returning series:

- American Ninja Warrior
- America's Got Talent
- Chicago Fire
- Chicago Med
- Chicago P.D.
- Dateline NBC
- Football Night in America
- La Brea
- Law & Order
- Law & Order: Organized Crime
- Law & Order: Special Victims Unit
- Lopez vs Lopez
- Magnum P.I.
- NBC Sunday Night Football
- NBC Sunday Night Movie
- Night Court
- Password
- Quantum Leap
- Transplant
- That's My Jam
- The Voice
- The Wall
- Weakest Link

New series:

- America's Got Talent: Fantasy League
- Big Ten Saturday Night
- Deal or No Deal Island
- Extended Family
- Found
- The Irrational

Not returning from 2022–23:

- American Auto
- America's Got Talent: All-Stars
- The Blacklist
- Grand Crew
- Hot Wheels: Ultimate Challenge
- LA Fire & Rescue
- New Amsterdam
- The Wheel
- Young Rock

== Renewals and cancellations ==
=== Full season pickups ===
==== ABC ====
- Abbott Elementary—Picked up for a 14-episode full season on November 10, 2023.

==== CBS ====
- Young Sheldon—Picked up for a 14-episode full season on November 10, 2023.

==== The CW ====
- All American—Picked up for two additional episodes on April 22, 2024, bringing the episode count to 15.

==== NBC ====
- The Irrational—Picked up for an 11-episode full season on November 17, 2023.
- Lopez vs Lopez—Picked up for a 10-episode full season on November 17, 2023.
- Night Court—Picked up for a 13-episode full season on November 17, 2023.

=== Renewals ===
==== ABC ====
- The $100,000 Pyramid—Renewed for an eighth season on November 11, 2024.
- 20/20—Renewed for a forty-seventh season on May 14, 2024.
- 9-1-1—Renewed for an eighth season on April 2, 2024.
- ABC Hockey Saturday—Renewed for an eleventh season on March 10, 2021; deal will last into a fourteenth season in 2027.
- Abbott Elementary—Renewed for a fourth season on February 10, 2024.
- American Idol—Renewed for a twenty-third season on May 10, 2024.
- America's Funniest Home Videos—Renewed for a thirty-fifth season on May 13, 2024.
- The Bachelor—Renewed for a twenty-ninth season on May 10, 2024.
- The Bachelorette—Renewed for a twenty-second season on September 10, 2025.
- Bachelor in Paradise—Renewed for a tenth season on July 10, 2024.
- Bad Romance: A Special Edition of 20/20—Renewed for a second season on March 13, 2025.
- Celebrity Family Feud—Renewed for a twelfth season on April 30, 2025.
- Celebrity Jeopardy!—Renewed for a third season on May 10, 2024.
- Celebrity Wheel of Fortune—Renewed for a fifth season on May 10, 2024.
- The Conners—Renewed for a seventh and final season on May 2, 2024.
- Dancing with the Stars—Renewed for a thirty-third season on May 10, 2024.
- The Golden Bachelor—Renewed for a second season on April 22, 2025.
- The Great Christmas Light Fight—Renewed for a twelfth season on November 2, 2023.
- Grey's Anatomy—Renewed for a twenty-first season on April 2, 2024.
- Jeopardy! Masters—Renewed for a third season on March 27, 2025.
- Monday Night Football—Renewed for a fifth season on March 18, 2021; deal will go to a thirteenth season in 2033.
- The Rookie—Renewed for a seventh season on April 15, 2024.
- Shark Tank—Renewed for a sixteenth season on May 10, 2024.
- What Would You Do?—Renewed for a seventeenth season on May 10, 2024.
- Who Wants to Be a Millionaire—Renewed for a twenty-fourth season on April 22, 2025.
- Will Trent—Renewed for a third season on April 3, 2024.

==== CBS ====
- 48 Hours—Renewed for a thirty-seventh season on May 2, 2024.
- 60 Minutes—Renewed for a fifty-seventh season on May 2, 2024.
- The Amazing Race—Renewed for a thirty-seventh season on May 2, 2024.
- Big Brother—Renewed for a twenty-seventh season on May 14, 2025.
- Blue Bloods—The series' final season was split into two parts due to the double Hollywood strikes, with the first ten episodes airing this season, and the remaining eight episodes of the final season airing in the 2024–25 season.
- Elsbeth—Renewed for a second season on April 18, 2024.
- The Equalizer—Renewed for a fifth season on April 25, 2024.
- FBI—Renewed for a seventh, eighth and ninth season on April 9, 2024.
- FBI: International—Renewed for a fourth season on April 9, 2024.
- FBI: Most Wanted—Renewed for a sixth season on April 9, 2024.
- Fire Country—Renewed for a third season on March 12, 2024.
- Ghosts—Renewed for a fourth season on March 12, 2024.
- NCIS—Renewed for a twenty-second season on April 9, 2024.
- NCIS: Sydney—Renewed for a second season on March 19, 2024.
- The Neighborhood—Renewed for a seventh season on April 9, 2024.
- Raid the Cage—Renewed for a second season on May 2, 2024.
- Survivor—Renewed for a forty-seventh and forty-eighth season on May 2, 2024.
- S.W.A.T.—Renewed for an eighth season on April 11, 2024, reversing plans to conclude the show after season seven on May 17, 2024.
- Tracker—Renewed for a second season on March 4, 2024.

==== The CW ====
- All American—Renewed for a seventh season on June 3, 2024.
- Inside the NFL—Renewed for a forty-eighth season on May 16, 2024.
- Penn & Teller: Fool Us—Renewed for an eleventh season on June 3, 2024.
- Sullivan's Crossing—Renewed for a second season on June 8, 2023, and a third season on December 11, 2024.
- Totally Funny Animals—Renewed for a second season on April 22, 2025.
- Wild Cards—Renewed for a second season on May 23, 2024.
- Whose Line Is It Anyway?—Renewed for a twenty-first season on May 16, 2024.

==== Fox ====
- The 1% Club—Renewed for a second season on January 23, 2025.
- Alert: Missing Persons Unit—Renewed for a third season on May 10, 2024.
- America's Most Wanted—Renewed for a twenty-ninth season on March 25, 2025.
- Animal Control—Renewed for a third season on February 6, 2024.
- Beat Shazam—Renewed for an eighth season on December 19, 2024.
- Bob's Burgers—Renewed for a fifteenth season on January 26, 2023.
- The Cleaning Lady—Renewed for a fourth season on May 12, 2024.
- Family Guy—Renewed for a twenty-third season on January 26, 2023.
- Farmer Wants a Wife—Renewed for a third season on December 12, 2024.
- The Floor—Renewed for a second and third season on May 13, 2024.
- The Great North—Renewed for a fifth season on May 13, 2024.
- Grimsburg—Renewed for a second season on October 17, 2022.
- Hell's Kitchen—Renewed for a twenty-third and twenty-fourth season on March 26, 2024.
- Kitchen Nightmares—Renewed for a ninth season on November 1, 2024.
- Krapopolis—Renewed for a second season on October 7, 2022, a third season on March 1, 2023 and a fourth season on July 25, 2024.
- Lego Masters—Renewed for a fifth season on September 13, 2023.
- Lego Masters: Celebrity Holiday Bricktacular—Renewed for a third season on September 13, 2023.
- The Masked Singer—Renewed for a twelfth season on May 13, 2024.
- MasterChef—Renewed for a fifteenth season on May 13, 2024.
- Next Level Chef—Renewed for a fourth season on May 11, 2023.
- The Quiz with Balls—Renewed for a second season on February 21, 2025.
- The Simpsons—Renewed for a thirty-sixth season on January 26, 2023.
- Special Forces: World's Toughest Test—Renewed for a third season on May 13, 2024.

==== NBC ====
- American Ninja Warrior—Renewed for a seventeenth season on February 3, 2025.
- America's Got Talent—Renewed for a twentieth season on February 3, 2025.
- Big Ten Saturday Night—Renewed for a second season on August 18, 2022; deal will last into a seventh season in 2029.
- Chicago Fire—Renewed for a thirteenth season on March 21, 2024.
- Chicago Med—Renewed for a tenth season on March 21, 2024.
- Chicago P.D.—Renewed for a twelfth season on March 21, 2024.
- Dateline NBC—Renewed for a thirty-third season on May 10, 2024.
- Deal or No Deal Island—Renewed for a second season on May 7, 2024.
- Football Night in America—Renewed for a nineteenth season on March 18, 2021; deal will go to a twenty-eighth season in 2033.
- Found—Renewed for a second season on November 29, 2023.
- The Irrational—Renewed for a second season on November 29, 2023.
- Law & Order—Renewed for a twenty-fourth season on March 21, 2024.
- Law & Order: Organized Crime—Renewed for a fifth season on April 25, 2024 and would be moving to Peacock.
- Law & Order: Special Victims Unit—Renewed for a twenty-sixth season on March 21, 2024.
- Lopez vs Lopez—Renewed for a third season on May 7, 2024.
- NBC Sunday Night Football—Renewed for a nineteenth season on March 18, 2021; deal will go to a twenty-eighth season in 2033.
- Night Court—Renewed for a third season on May 3, 2024.
- Password—Renewed for a third season on August 27, 2025.
- The Voice—Renewed for a twenty-sixth season on May 10, 2024 and later a twenty-seventh season on June 4, 2024.
- Weakest Link—Renewed for a fourth season on May 12, 2025 and would be moving to Fox.

=== Cancellations/series endings ===
==== ABC ====
- The Good Doctor—It was announced on January 11, 2024, that season seven would be the final season. The series concluded on May 21, 2024.
- The Interrogation Tapes: A Special Edition of 20/20—The miniseries was meant to run for one season only; it concluded on April 29, 2024.
- Lucky 13—Canceled on November 14, 2024.
- Not Dead Yet—Canceled on May 10, 2024, after two seasons.
- Station 19—It was announced on December 8, 2023, that season seven would be the final season. The series concluded on May 30, 2024.

==== CBS ====
- Bob Hearts Abishola—It was announced on November 29, 2023, that season five would be the final season. The series concluded on May 6, 2024.
- CSI: Vegas—Canceled on April 19, 2024, after three seasons. The series concluded on May 19, 2024.
- Lotería Loca—Pulled from the schedule on October 31, 2023, after five episodes, marking the first cancellation of the season.
- NCIS: Hawaiʻi—Canceled on April 26, 2024, after three seasons. The series concluded on May 6, 2024.
- So Help Me Todd—Canceled on April 19, 2024, after two seasons. The series concluded on May 16, 2024.
- Young Sheldon—It was announced on November 14, 2023, that season seven would be the final season. The series concluded on May 16, 2024.

==== The CW ====
- All American: Homecoming—Canceled on June 5, 2024, after three seasons. The series concluded on September 30, 2024.
- Everyone Else Burns—Pulled from the schedule on November 16, 2023.
- Run the Burbs—Pulled from the schedule on November 16, 2023.
- The Spencer Sisters—Canceled on May 16, 2024.
- Walker—Canceled on May 21, 2024, after four seasons. The series concluded on June 26, 2024.

==== Fox ====
- So You Think You Can Dance—Canceled on May 11, 2026, after eighteen seasons.
- WWE SmackDown—It was announced on September 21, 2023, that the series would move to USA Network.

==== NBC ====
- Extended Family—Canceled on May 7, 2024.
- La Brea—It was announced on November 20, 2023, that season three would be the final season. The series concluded on February 13, 2024.
- Magnum P.I.—It was announced on June 23, 2023, that season five would be the final season. The series concluded on January 3, 2024.
- Quantum Leap—Canceled on April 5, 2024, after two seasons.

== See also ==
- 2023–24 Canadian network television schedule
- 2023–24 United States network television schedule (morning)
- 2023–24 United States network television schedule (daytime)
- 2023–24 United States network television schedule (late night)
- 2023–24 United States network television schedule (overnight)
