= List of 2024 American television debuts =

These American television shows premiered in 2024.

First aired	Title	Channel	Source
January 1	America's Got Talent: Fantasy League	NBC	
January 2	The Floor	Fox	
January 3	We Are Family	Fox	
January 4	The Brothers Sun	Netflix	
January 4	Sanctuary: A Witch's Tale	Sundance Now/AMC+	
January 7	Grimsburg	Fox	
January 8	Secrets of Polygamy	A&E	
January 10	The Trust: A Game of Greed	Netflix	
January 10	Criminal Record	Apple TV+	
January 11	Ted	Peacock	
January 11	Boy Swallows Universe	Netflix	
January 11	The Tall Tales of Jim Bridger	INSP	
January 13	The Weekend	MSNBC	
January 13	Fox News Saturday Night with Jimmy Failla	Fox News Channel	
January 16	After Midnight	CBS	
January 16	Death and Other Details	Hulu	
January 18	On the Roam	Max	
January 19	Hazbin Hotel	Amazon Prime Video	
January 22	Battle on the Mountain	HGTV	
January 24	Chrissy & Dave Dine Out	Freeform	
January 24	A Real Bug's Life	Disney+	
January 25	In the Know	Peacock	
January 31	Choir	Disney+	
February 2	Mr. & Mrs. Smith	Amazon Prime Video	
February 5	Dee & Friends in Oz	Netflix	
February 5	Lyla in the Loop	PBS Kids	
February 8	Couple to Throuple	Peacock	
February 11	Ninja Kamui	Adult Swim	
February 11	Tracker	CBS	
February 11	Stupid Pet Tricks	TBS	
February 12	Rock Paper Scissors	Nickelodeon	
February 14	The New Look	Apple TV+	
February 15	The Vince Staples Show	Netflix	
February 15	Churchy	BET+	
February 16	Totally Funny Animals	The CW	
February 16	Totally Funny Kids	The CW	
February 20	Crime Nation	The CW	
February 21	Constellation	Apple TV+	
February 22	Avatar: The Last Airbender	Netflix	
February 23	The Second Best Hospital in the Galaxy	Amazon Prime Video	
February 24	Where Is Wendy Williams?	Lifetime	
February 26	Deal or No Deal Island	NBC	
February 27	Shōgun	Hulu	
February 28	Iwájú	Disney+	
February 29	Elsbeth	CBS	
March 1	Megamind Rules!	Peacock	
March 4	Hot Wheels Let's Race	Netflix	
March 7	The Gentlemen	Netflix	
March 7	Friends in Low Places	Amazon Prime Video	
March 12	Wildcard Kitchen	Food Network	
March 14	The Girls on the Bus	Max	
March 17	Quiet on Set: The Dark Side of Kids TV	Investigation Discovery	
March 19	The Valley	Bravo	
March 20	Morphle and the Magic Pets	Disney+/Disney Jr.	
March 20	Palm Royale	Apple TV+	
March 20	X-Men '97	Disney+	
March 21	3 Body Problem	Netflix	
March 21	Ark: The Animated Series	Paramount+	
March 28	The Baxters	Amazon Prime Video	
March 29	Jerrod Carmichael Reality Show	HBO	
March 31	The Hill Sunday with Chris Stirewalt	NewsNation	
March 31	Parish	AMC	
April 1	Lovers and Liars	The CW	
April 1	Vanderpump Villa	Hulu	
April 1	The Magic Prank Show with Justin Willman	Netflix	
April 4	Hop	Max	
April 5	Sugar	Apple TV+	
April 9	Grand Cayman: Secrets in Paradise	Freeform	
April 10	Fallout	Amazon Prime Video	
April 11	Patti Stanger: The Matchmaker	The CW	
April 12	Good Times: Black Again	Netflix	
April 14	24 in 24: Last Chef Standing	Food Network	
April 17	Our Living World	Netflix	
April 18	Conan O'Brien Must Go	Max	
April 18	Dinner with the Parents	Amazon Prime Video/Amazon Freevee	
April 18	Going Home with Tyler Cameron	Amazon Prime Video	
April 19	The Spiderwick Chronicles	The Roku Channel	
April 19	The Never Ever Mets	Oprah Winfrey Network	
April 20	High Hopes	Hulu	
April 25	Dead Boy Detectives	Netflix	
May 2	Selena + Restaurant	Food Network/Max	
May 6	OMG Fashun	E!	
May 7	Police 24/7	The CW	
May 8	Dark Matter	Apple TV+	
May 9	Bodkin	Netflix	
May 14	Hostage Rescue	The CW	
May 15	Royal Rules of Ohio	Freeform	
May 20	The Fairly OddParents: A New Wish	Nickelodeon	
May 21	Angry Birds Mystery Island	Amazon Prime Video	
May 23	Thirst with Shay Mitchell	Max	
May 23	The 1% Club	Amazon Prime Video	
May 23	Tires	Netflix	
May 24	Jurassic World: Chaos Theory	Netflix	
May 27	Fallen Idols: Nick and Aaron Carter	Investigation Discovery	
May 28	The Quiz with Balls	Fox	
June 4	The Acolyte	Disney+	
June 7	Fantasmas	HBO	
June 12	Presumed Innocent	Apple TV+	
June 14	Camp Snoopy	Apple TV+	
June 14	The Big Bakeover	The CW	
June 16	Hotel Cocaine	MGM+	
June 20	Perfect Wife: The Mysterious Disappearance of Sherri Papini	Hulu	
June 23	Orphan Black: Echoes	AMC/AMC+/BBC America	
June 26	Land of Women	Apple TV+	
June 26	The Real CSI: Miami	CBS	
June 27	Ariel	Disney Jr.	
June 27	My Lady Jane	Amazon Prime Video	
June 28	Owning Manhattan	Netflix	
June 28	Zombies: The Re-Animated Series	Disney Channel/Disney+	
June 28	WondLa	Apple TV+	
July 5	Down in the Valley	Starz	
July 9	Sasha Reid and the Midnight Order	Freeform	
July 10	Sunny	Apple TV+	
July 11	Sausage Party: Foodtopia	Amazon Prime Video	
July 12	Exploding Kittens	Netflix	
July 14	The Emperor of Ocean Park	MGM+	
July 15	Wonderoos	Netflix	
July 18	Those About to Die	Peacock	
July 18	Lucky 13	ABC	
July 18	Kite Man: Hell Yeah!	Max	
July 24	Wayne Brady: The Family Remix	Freeform	
July 24	Time Bandits	Apple TV+	
July 25	The Decameron	Netflix	
July 25	Primos	Disney Channel	
July 29	GMFB: Overtime	The Roku Channel	
August 1	Batman: Caped Crusader	Amazon Prime Video	
August 7	Dance Moms: A New Era	Hulu	
August 8	Mr. Throwback	Peacock	
August 9	Tales of the Teenage Mutant Ninja Turtles	Paramount+	
August 9	The Braxtons	WE tv	
August 14	Bad Monkey	Apple TV+	
August 16	Rick and Morty: The Anime	Adult Swim	
August 16	RuPaul's Drag Race Global All Stars	Paramount+	
August 24	Breakfast Ball	Fox Sports 1	
August 29	Terminator Zero	Netflix	
August 29	Kaos	Netflix	
September 2	English Teacher	FX	
September 3	Kindergarten: The Musical	Disney Jr.	
September 5	The Perfect Couple	Netflix	
September 6	The Secret Lives of Mormon Wives	Hulu	
September 8	Universal Basic Guys	Fox	
September 9	Flip Side	First-run syndication	
September 9	True Crime News	First-run syndication	
September 13	How to Die Alone	Hulu	
September 14	Have I Got News for You	CNN	
September 17	High Potential	ABC	
September 17	American Sports Story	FX	
September 18	The Golden Bachelorette	ABC	
September 19	Twilight of the Gods	Netflix	
September 19	Monsters: The Lyle and Erik Menendez Story	Netflix	
September 19	The Penguin	HBO	
September 22	Rescue: HI-Surf	Fox	
September 22	Matlock	CBS	
September 23	Brilliant Minds	NBC	
September 23	Crime Exposé with Nancy O'Dell	First-run syndication	
September 24	Murder in a Small Town	Fox	
September 24	Penelope	Netflix	
September 25	Grotesquerie	FX	
September 25	Everybody Still Hates Chris	Comedy Central	
September 26	Doctor Odyssey	ABC	
September 26	Nobody Wants This	Netflix	
September 27	Social Studies	FX	
September 29	Uzumaki	Adult Swim	
October 4	Fat Joe Talks	Starz	
October 6	The Franchise	HBO	
October 10	Tomb Raider: The Legend of Lara Croft	Netflix	
October 10	Teacup	Peacock	
October 14	The Wranglers	The CW	
October 14	NCIS: Origins	CBS	
October 14	Barney's World	Max	
October 14	Mighty Monsterwheelies	Netflix	
October 15	Anatomy of Lies	Peacock	
October 16	The Summit	CBS	
October 16	Are You Smarter than a Celebrity?	Amazon Prime Video	
October 17	Georgie & Mandy's First Marriage	CBS	
October 17	The Pradeeps of Pittsburgh	Amazon Prime Video/Amazon Freevee	
October 18	Happy's Place	NBC	
October 18	Hysteria!	Peacock	
October 18	It's Florida, Man	HBO	
October 21	Poppa's House	CBS	
October 24	Beauty in Black	Netflix	
October 24	The Pasta Queen	Amazon Prime Video	
October 29	Wizards Beyond Waverly Place	Disney Channel	
October 30	Max & the Midknights	Nickelodeon	
November 2	Invincible Fight Girl	Adult Swim	
November 7	The Day of the Jackal	Peacock	
November 12	St. Denis Medical	NBC	
November 14	Carl the Collector	PBS Kids	
November 14	Cross	Amazon Prime Video	
November 15	The Creep Tapes	Shudder/AMC+	
November 17	Landman	Paramount+	
November 17	Dune: Prophecy	HBO	
November 19	Interior Chinatown	Hulu	
November 19	Making Manson	Peacock	
November 20	Our Oceans	Netflix	
November 21	Cruel Intentions	Amazon Prime Video	
November 21	A Man on the Inside	Netflix	
November 25	Get Millie Black	HBO	
November 28	The Madness	Netflix	
November 29	The Agency	Paramount+ with Showtime	
December 1	Earth Abides	MGM+	
December 2	Star Wars: Skeleton Crew	Disney+	
December 4	Pop Culture Jeopardy!	Amazon Prime Video	
December 5	Creature Commandos	Max	
December 5	Jentry Chau vs. the Underworld	Netflix	
December 5	Snoop Dogg's Fatherhood: Cori and Wayne's Story	E!	
December 6	The Sticky	Amazon Prime Video	
December 10	Secret Level	Amazon Prime Video	
December 11	Dream Productions	Disney+	
December 12	No Good Deed	Netflix	
December 12	Paris & Nicole: The Encore	Peacock	
December 13	Dexter: Original Sin	Paramount+ with Showtime	
December 19	Beast Games	Amazon Prime Video	
December 19	Laid	Peacock	

== Television films and specials ==
These television films and specials premiered in 2024.

First aired	Title	Channel	Source
January 1	M*A*S*H: The Comedy That Changed Television	Fox	
January 4	The Golden Wedding	ABC	
January 4	General Hospital: 60 Years of Stars and Storytelling	ABC	
January 13	Craig Before the Creek	Cartoon Network	
February 16	Snoopy Presents: Welcome Home, Franklin	Apple TV+	
March 6	Erika Jayne: Bet It All on Blonde	Bravo	
March 7	The Thundermans Return	Nickelodeon/Paramount+	
March 9	Hunting Housewives	Lifetime	
March 26	The Truth vs. Alex Jones	HBO	
April 1	Bray Wyatt: Becoming Immortal	Peacock	
April 14	The 100th: Billy Joel at Madison Square Garden – The Greatest Arena Run of All Time	CBS	
May 1	Dance Moms: The Reunion	Lifetime	
May 2	The Contestant	Hulu	
May 14	The Tonight Show Starring Jimmy Fallon: 10th Anniversary Special	NBC	
May 18	The Bad Guardian	Lifetime	
May 24	South Park: The End of Obesity	Paramount+	
May 25	Gaga Chromatica Ball	HBO	
May 31	The Great Lillian Hall	HBO	
June 22	The Bad Orphan	Lifetime	
June 30	Watch What Happens Live with Andy Cohen: 15th Anniversary Special	Bravo	
July 12	Descendants: The Rise of Red	Disney+	
August 9	13 Days in Ferguson	CBS	
August 28	Toby Keith: American Icon	NBC	
September 7	His & Hers	Hallmark Channel	
September 12	AI and the Future of Us: An Oprah Winfrey Special	ABC	
October 3	Velma: This Halloween Needs To Be More Special!	Max	
October 6	American Music Awards 50th Anniversary Special	CBS	
October 9	Secret Life of Diddy — A Special Edition of 20/20	ABC	
October 11	Latinos in Hollywood: Owning Our Destiny	ABC	
October 12	Christmas Wreaths and Ribbons	Great American Family	
October 14	Family Guy: Peter, Peter, Pumpkin Cheater	Hulu	
October 19	A Vintage Christmas	Great American Family	
October 24	This Time Each Year	Hallmark Mystery	
October 24	One Direction: Liam Payne's Final Days	Hulu	
October 26	A Christmas Castle Proposal	Great American Family	
October 26	Mormon Mom Gone Wrong: The Ruby Franke Story	Lifetime	
October 26	Seth Meyers: Dad Man Walking	HBO	
October 27	Chris Brown: A History of Violence	Investigation Discovery	
October 30	Love Is Blind: The Reunion	Netflix	
November 2	Tails of Christmas	Great American Family	
November 2	United Way Benefit For Hurricane Relief	CBS/CMT	
November 3	Holiday Mismatch	Hallmark Channel	
November 7	A Christmas Miracle	BET+	
November 9	Christmas Under the Northern Lights	Great American Family	
November 10	Coupled Up for Christmas	Great American Family	
November 11	SpongeBob SquarePants: Snow Yellow and the Seven Jellies	Nickelodeon	
November 12	Larger Than Life: Reign of the Boybands	Paramount+	
November 14	Style Me for Christmas	BET+	
November 16	Christmas in the Spotlight	Lifetime	
November 16	A Christmas Less Traveled	Great American Family	
November 17	Dr. Sanjay Gupta Reports: Is Ozempic Right For You?	CNN	
November 19	Defying Gravity: The Curtain Rises on Wicked	NBC	
November 19	Vegas Lights & Country Nights: Countdown to the CMA Awards – A Special Edition of 20/20	ABC	
November 21	A Wesley South African Christmas	BET+	
November 21	Nugget Is Dead? A Christmas Story	CBS	
November 22	Christmas on Call	Hallmark Channel	
November 25	Family Guy: Gift of the White Guy	Hulu	
November 27	The Untold Story of Mary Poppins: A Special Edition of 20/20	ABC	
November 28	The Day Before Christmas	BET+	
November 28	Debbie Macomber's Joyful Mrs. Christmas	Hallmark Channel	
November 28	Toon in with Me: A Day of Thanks	MeTV	
November 29	Deck the Walls	Hallmark Channel	
November 30	Holiday Touchdown: A Chiefs Love Story	Hallmark Channel	
December 1	The Christmas Quest	Hallmark Channel	
December 1	Mickey and the Very Many Christmases	Disney Jr.	
December 2	The Patrick Star Show: Squidina's Holidaze Special!	Nickelodeon	
December 2	SpongeBob & Sandy's Country Christmas	Nickelodeon/Paramount+	
December 4	Jimmy Fallon's Holiday Seasoning Spectacular	NBC	
December 5	Brewster's Millions: Christmas	BET+	
December 6	A Nonsense Christmas	Netflix	
December 7	A Season to Remember	Oprah Winfrey Network	
December 9	The Real Full Monty	Fox	
December 11	A Motown Christmas	NBC	
December 12	Too Many Christmases	BET+	
December 14	Mistletoe & Matrimony	Oprah Winfrey Network	
December 17	The Simpsons: O C'mon All Ye Faithful	Disney+	
December 19	Queen of Christmas	BET+	
December 20	Josh Groban & Friends Go Home for the Holidays	CBS	
December 21	24-Karat Christmas	Oprah Winfrey Network	
December 25	Blended Christmas	BET+	
December 29	Jimmy Carter: A Full Life – A Special Edition of 20/20	ABC	

== Miniseries ==
This listing consists of shows classified as miniseries, limited series, or limited docuseries that premiered in 2024.

First aired	Title	Channel	Source
January 9	Echo	Disney+/Hulu	
January 14	Monsieur Spade	AMC	
January 25	Griselda	Netflix	
January 26	Masters of the Air	Apple TV+	
January 26	Expats	Amazon Prime Video	
February 25	The Walking Dead: The Ones Who Live	AMC	
March 3	The Regime	HBO	
March 14	Apples Never Fall	Peacock	
March 15	Manhunt	Apple TV+	
March 28	We Were the Lucky Ones	Hulu	
March 29	A Gentleman in Moscow	Paramount+/Paramount+ with Showtime	
April 4	Ripley	Netflix	
April 12	Franklin	Apple TV+	
April 14	The Sympathizer	HBO	
April 17	Under the Bridge	Hulu	
April 26	Knuckles	Paramount+	
April 30	The Veil	Hulu	
May 2	The Tattooist of Auschwitz	Peacock	
May 2	A Man in Full	Netflix	
May 17	The Big Cigar	Apple TV+	
May 30	Eric	Netflix	
June 4	Clipped	Hulu	
July 19	Lady in the Lake	Apple TV+	
September 5	Fight Night: The Million Dollar Heist	Peacock	
September 13	Three Women	Starz	
September 18	Agatha All Along	Disney+	
October 11	Disclaimer	Apple TV+	
October 25	Before	Apple TV+	

== See also ==
- 2024 in American television
