= List of programs broadcast by The CW =

The CW is an American commercial broadcasting television network that launched in 2006, as the successor to UPN and The WB. It is owned by Nexstar Media Group through an 81.1% majority stake, with Skydance Corporation controlling a 18.9% stake. Below is a list of programs that are currently and were formerly broadcast on the network.

== Current programming ==
=== Unscripted ===
==== Reality ====
| Title | Genre | Premiere | Seasons | Runtime | Status |
|---|---|---|---|---|---|
| Police 24/7 | Reality | May 7, 2024 | 2 seasons, 60 episodes | 39–82 min | Season 3 due to premiere on March 10, 2027 |

==== Variety ====
| Title | Genre | Premiere | Seasons | Runtime | Status |
|---|---|---|---|---|---|
| Totally Funny Animals | Comedy clip show | February 16, 2024 | 2 seasons, 56 episodes | 20–21 min | Season 2 ongoing |
| Scrabble | Game show | October 3, 2024 | 2 seasons, 40 episodes | 40–42 min | Season 2 ongoing Season 3 due to premiere on February 18, 2027 |
| Trivial Pursuit | Game show | October 3, 2024 | 2 seasons, 41 episodes | 42–43 min | Season 2 ongoing Renewed |

=== Co-productions ===
| Title | Genre | Partner/Region | Premiere | Seasons | Runtime | Status |
|---|---|---|---|---|---|---|
| Wild Cards | Police procedural | CBC/Canada | January 17, 2024 | 3 seasons, 33 episodes | 43–44 min | Season 4 due to premiere on February 1, 2027 |
| Sullivan's Crossing (seasons 2–4) | Drama | CTV/Canada | October 2, 2024 | 3 seasons, 30 episodes | 42–44 min | Renewed |
| Sherlock & Daughter | Mystery drama | Discovery+/United Kingdom & Ireland | April 16, 2025 | 1 season, 8 episodes | 42 min | Pending (Note: A second season is in development, but it is currently unconfirmed whether it has been greenlit.) |

=== Continuations ===
| Title | Genre | Prev. network | Premiere | Seasons | Runtime | Status |
|---|---|---|---|---|---|---|
| Penn & Teller: Fool Us (seasons 2–11) | Magic competition | ITV | July 30, 2014 | 10 seasons, 162 episodes | 45 min | Season 12 due to premiere on January 22, 2027 |
| Masters of Illusion (seasons 4–14) | Stage magic | Pax TV (season 1); MyNetworkTV (season 2); Syndication (season 3) | August 1, 2014 | 11 seasons, 168 episodes | 41 min | Season 15 due to premiere on January 22, 2027 |

=== News programming ===
| Title | Genre | Premiere | Runtime | Status |
|---|---|---|---|---|
| The Hill Sunday with Chris Stirewalt | Sunday morning talk show | April 7, 2024 | 60 min | Ongoing (Note: Simulcast with NewsNation.) |

=== Sports programming ===
| Title | Genre | Premiere | Runtime | Status |
|---|---|---|---|---|
| ACC Football | Sports broadcast | September 9, 2023 | 3 hours (approx.) | Ongoing |
| ACC Basketball | Sports broadcast | December 2, 2023 | 2 hours (approx.) | Ongoing |
| Arizona Bowl | Sports broadcast | December 30, 2023 | 3 hours (approx.) | Ongoing |
| CW College Football Countdown | Pre-game show | August 31, 2024 | 3 hours (approx.) | Ongoing |
| Pac-12 Football (Note: Originally aired on Pac-12 Network) | Sports broadcast | August 31, 2024 | 3 hours (approx.) | Ongoing |
| NASCAR Countdown Live | Pre-game show | September 20, 2024 | 30 min (approx.) | Ongoing |
| NASCAR on The CW (Note: Originally aired on Fox Sports and NBC Sports) | Sports broadcast | September 20, 2024 | 2 hours (approx.) | Ongoing |
| WWE NXT (Note: Originally aired on various networks.) | Sports entertainment | October 1, 2024 | 2 hours (approx.) | Ongoing |
| AVP Volleyball | Sports broadcast | May 24, 2025 | 2 hours (approx.) | Ongoing |
| PBR Bull Riding | Sports broadcast | August 9, 2025 | 90–150 min (approx.) | Ongoing |
| PBA Bowling | Sports broadcast | February 22, 2026 | 2 hours (approx.) | Ongoing |
| Banana Ball | Sports broadcast | May 10, 2026 | 150 min (approx.) | Ongoing |
| NXT Premium Live Events | Sports entertainment | June 28, 2026 | 3 hours (approx.) | Ongoing |
| Mountain West Football | Sports broadcast | September 5, 2026 | 3 hours (approx.) | Ongoing |
| Pac-12 Basketball | Sports broadcast | November 15, 2026 | 2 hours (approx.) | Ongoing |

=== Acquired programming ===
| Title | Genre | Network/Region | Premiere | Seasons | Runtime | Status |
|---|---|---|---|---|---|---|
| Law & Order Toronto: Criminal Intent | Police procedural | Citytv/Canada | September 24, 2025 | 2 seasons, 16 episodes | 43 min | Season 2 ongoing (Note: The series has also been renewed for seasons 3 and 4 by Citytv, but it is currently unconfirmed whether they will air on The CW.) |
| The American Bible Challenge | Game show | Game Show Network/United States | April 3, 2026 | 1 season, 9 episodes | 42–44 min | Pending (Note: Three seasons have aired on Game Show Network, but it is currently unconfirmed whether future seasons will air on The CW.) |
| Private Eyes West Coast | Crime procedural | Global/Canada | October 5, 2026 | 1 season, 6 episodes | 44 min | Season 1 ongoing (Note: The series has been renewed for a second season by Corus Entertainment, but it is currently unconfirmed whether it will air on The CW.) |

== Upcoming programming ==
=== Sports programming ===
| Title | Genre | Premiere | Runtime | Status |
|---|---|---|---|---|
| Mountain West Basketball | Sports broadcast | 2026 | 2 hours (approx.) | Pending |
| Holiday Bowl | Sports broadcast | 2026 | 3 hours (approx.) | Pending |
| Poinsettia Bowl | Sports broadcast | 2026 | 3 hours (approx.) | Pending |
| NHRA Drag Racing | Sports broadcast | 2027 | 2 hours (approx.) | Pending |

== Former programming ==
=== Drama ===
| Title | Premiere date | Finale date | Number of seasons | Notes |
|---|---|---|---|---|
| 7th Heaven (season 11) | September 25, 2006 | May 13, 2007 | 1 | Originally aired on The WB |
| Runaway | September 25, 2006 | October 15, 2006 | 1 | |
| Gilmore Girls (season 7) | September 26, 2006 | May 15, 2007 | 1 | Originally aired on The WB |
| One Tree Hill (seasons 4–9) | September 27, 2006 | April 4, 2012 | 6 | Originally aired on The WB |
| Smallville (seasons 6–10) | September 28, 2006 | May 13, 2011 | 5 | Originally aired on The WB |
| Supernatural (seasons 2–15) | September 28, 2006 | November 19, 2020 | 14 | Originally aired on The WB |
| Veronica Mars (season 3) | October 3, 2006 | May 22, 2007 | 1 | Originally aired on UPN; Later moved to Hulu |
| Hidden Palms | May 30, 2007 | July 4, 2007 | 1 | |
| Gossip Girl | September 19, 2007 | December 17, 2012 | 6 | |
| Reaper | September 25, 2007 | May 26, 2009 | 2 | |
| Life Is Wild | October 7, 2007 | February 3, 2008 | 1 | |
| 90210 | September 2, 2008 | May 13, 2013 | 5 | |
| Privileged | September 9, 2008 | February 24, 2009 | 1 | |
| Melrose Place | September 8, 2009 | April 13, 2010 | 1 | |
| The Vampire Diaries | September 10, 2009 | March 10, 2017 | 8 | |
| The Beautiful Life | September 16, 2009 | December 18, 2009 | 1 | |
| Life Unexpected | January 18, 2010 | January 18, 2011 | 2 | |
| Hellcats | September 8, 2010 | May 17, 2011 | 1 | |
| Nikita | September 9, 2010 | December 27, 2013 | 4 | |
| Ringer | September 13, 2011 | April 17, 2012 | 1 | |
| The Secret Circle | September 15, 2011 | May 10, 2012 | 1 | |
| Hart of Dixie | September 26, 2011 | March 27, 2015 | 4 | |
| Arrow | October 10, 2012 | January 28, 2020 | 8 | |
| Beauty & the Beast | October 11, 2012 | September 15, 2016 | 4 | |
| Emily Owens, M.D. | October 16, 2012 | February 5, 2013 | 1 | |
| The Carrie Diaries | January 14, 2013 | January 31, 2014 | 2 | |
| Cult | February 19, 2013 | July 12, 2013 | 1 | |
| The Originals | October 3, 2013 | August 1, 2018 | 5 | |
| The Tomorrow People | October 9, 2013 | May 4, 2014 | 1 | |
| Reign | October 17, 2013 | June 16, 2017 | 4 | |
| Star-Crossed | February 17, 2014 | May 12, 2014 | 1 | |
| The 100 | March 19, 2014 | September 30, 2020 | 7 | |
| The Flash | October 7, 2014 | May 24, 2023 | 9 | |
| Jane the Virgin | October 13, 2014 | July 31, 2019 | 5 | |
| iZombie | March 17, 2015 | August 1, 2019 | 5 | |
| The Messengers | April 17, 2015 | July 24, 2015 | 1 | |
| Crazy Ex-Girlfriend | October 12, 2015 | April 5, 2019 | 4 | |
| Legends of Tomorrow | January 21, 2016 | March 2, 2022 | 7 | |
| Containment | April 19, 2016 | July 19, 2016 | 1 | |
| No Tomorrow | October 4, 2016 | January 17, 2017 | 1 | |
| Frequency | October 5, 2016 | January 25, 2017 | 1 | |
| Supergirl (seasons 2–6) | October 10, 2016 | November 9, 2021 | 5 | Originally aired on CBS |
| Riverdale | January 26, 2017 | August 23, 2023 | 7 | |
| Valor | October 9, 2017 | January 29, 2018 | 1 | |
| Dynasty | October 11, 2017 | September 16, 2022 | 5 | |
| Black Lightning | January 16, 2018 | May 24, 2021 | 4 | |
| Life Sentence | March 7, 2018 | June 15, 2018 | 1 | |
| All American | October 10, 2018 | September 28, 2026 | 8 | |
| Charmed | October 14, 2018 | June 10, 2022 | 4 | |
| Legacies | October 25, 2018 | June 16, 2022 | 4 | |
| Roswell, New Mexico | January 15, 2019 | September 5, 2022 | 4 | |
| In the Dark | April 4, 2019 | September 5, 2022 | 4 | |
| Pandora | July 16, 2019 | December 13, 2020 | 2 | |
| Two Sentence Horror Stories | August 8, 2019 | February 20, 2022 | 3 | |
| Batwoman | October 6, 2019 | March 2, 2022 | 3 | |
| Nancy Drew | October 9, 2019 | August 23, 2023 | 4 | |
| Katy Keene | February 6, 2020 | May 14, 2020 | 1 | |
| Stargirl | May 18, 2020 | December 7, 2022 | 3 | |
| Walker | January 21, 2021 | June 26, 2024 | 4 | |
| Superman & Lois | February 23, 2021 | December 2, 2024 | 4 | |
| Kung Fu | April 7, 2021 | March 8, 2023 | 3 | |
| The Republic of Sarah | June 14, 2021 | September 6, 2021 | 1 | |
| 4400 | October 25, 2021 | February 14, 2022 | 1 | |
| Naomi | January 11, 2022 | May 10, 2022 | 1 | |
| All American: Homecoming | February 21, 2022 | September 30, 2024 | 3 | |
| Tom Swift | May 31, 2022 | August 2, 2022 | 1 | |
| Walker: Independence | October 6, 2022 | March 2, 2023 | 1 | |
| The Winchesters | October 11, 2022 | March 7, 2023 | 1 | |
| Gotham Knights | March 14, 2023 | June 27, 2023 | 1 | |
| Sight Unseen (season 1) | April 3, 2024 | June 5, 2024 | 1 | Co-production with CTV |
| 61st Street (season 2) | July 22, 2024 | September 9, 2024 | 1 | Originally aired on AMC |
| Joan | October 2, 2024 | November 8, 2024 | 1 | Co-production with ITVX |
| Good Cop/Bad Cop | February 19, 2025 | April 9, 2025 | 1 | Co-production with Stan |

=== Comedy ===
| Title | Premiere date | Finale date | Number of seasons | Notes |
|---|---|---|---|---|
| All of Us (season 4) | October 1, 2006 | May 14, 2007 | 1 | Originally aired on UPN |
| Everybody Hates Chris (seasons 2–4) | October 1, 2006 | May 8, 2009 | 3 | Originally aired on UPN |
| Girlfriends (seasons 7–8) | October 1, 2006 | February 11, 2008 | 2 | Originally aired on UPN |
| The Game (seasons 1–3) | October 1, 2006 | May 15, 2009 | 3 | Later moved to BET |
| Reba (season 6) | November 19, 2006 | February 18, 2007 | 1 | Originally aired on The WB |
| Aliens in America | October 1, 2007 | May 18, 2008 | 1 | |
| Backpackers | July 14, 2014 | July 21, 2014 | 1 | |
| Significant Mother | August 19, 2015 | October 5, 2015 | 1 | |
| Son of a Critch (season 3) | January 25, 2024 | April 24, 2024 | 1 | Co-production with CBC |

=== Unscripted ===
| Title | Premiere date | Finale date | Number of seasons | Notes |
|---|---|---|---|---|
| America's Next Top Model (seasons 7–22) | September 20, 2006 | December 4, 2015 | 16 | Originally aired on UPN; Later moved to VH1 |
| Beauty and the Geek (seasons 3–5) | January 3, 2007 | May 13, 2008 | 3 | Originally aired on The WB |
| Pussycat Dolls Present | March 6, 2007 | April 23, 2008 | 2 | |
| CW Now | September 23, 2007 | February 24, 2008 | 1 | |
| Online Nation | September 23, 2007 | October 14, 2007 | 1 | |
| Crowned: The Mother of All Pageants | December 12, 2007 | January 30, 2008 | 1 | |
| Farmer Wants a Wife | April 30, 2008 | June 25, 2008 | 1 | Later revived by FOX |
| Stylista | October 22, 2008 | December 17, 2008 | 1 | |
| The CW Sunday Night Movie | November 30, 2008 | September 20, 2009 | 1 | |
| 13: Fear Is Real | January 7, 2009 | February 20, 2009 | 1 | |
| Hitched or Ditched | May 26, 2009 | June 30, 2009 | 1 | |
| High Society | March 10, 2010 | April 28, 2010 | 1 | |
| Fly Girls | March 24, 2010 | May 5, 2010 | 1 | |
| Plain Jane | July 28, 2010 | September 1, 2010 | 1 | |
| H8R | September 14, 2011 | October 5, 2011 | 1 | |
| Remodeled | January 17, 2012 | August 20, 2012 | 1 | |
| Shedding for the Wedding | February 23, 2012 | April 13, 2012 | 1 | |
| The Catalina | May 20, 2012 | July 3, 2012 | 1 | |
| Breaking Pointe | May 31, 2012 | September 16, 2013 | 2 | |
| The Next: Fame Is at Your Doorstep | August 16, 2012 | October 4, 2012 | 1 | |
| Oh Sit! | September 27, 2012 | December 19, 2013 | 2 | |
| Perfect Score | July 16, 2013 | September 27, 2013 | 1 | |
| Whose Line Is It Anyway? (seasons 9–21) | July 16, 2013 | November 1, 2024 | 13 | Originally aired on ABC (seasons 1–6) and ABC Family (seasons 7–8) |
| Capture | July 30, 2013 | September 25, 2013 | 1 | |
| Famous in 12 | June 3, 2014 | July 1, 2014 | 1 | |
| Cedric's Barber Battle | April 17, 2015 | July 27, 2015 | 1 | |
| A Wicked Offer | August 5, 2015 | September 23, 2015 | 1 | |
| Mad TV (season 15) | July 26, 2016 | September 27, 2016 | 1 | Originally aired on Fox |
| My Last Days | August 17, 2016 | June 5, 2019 | 3 | |
| Terry Crews Saves Christmas | December 20, 2016 | December 23, 2016 | 1 | |
| Mysteries Decoded | January 10, 2019 | October 4, 2022 | 2 | |
| The Big Stage | June 7, 2019 | September 27, 2019 | 1 | |
| Hypnotize Me | August 7, 2019 | September 25, 2019 | 1 | |
| Red Bull Peaking | September 13, 2019 | October 4, 2019 | 1 | |
| The Christmas Caroler Challenge | December 15, 2019 | December 25, 2020 | 2 | |
| The CW Happy Hour | June 9, 2020 | July 14, 2020 | 1 | |
| World's Funniest Animals | September 18, 2020 | August 29, 2024 | 4 | |
| Legends of the Hidden Temple (season 4) | October 10, 2021 | January 23, 2022 | 1 | Originally aired on Nickelodeon |
| Killer Camp (season 2) | October 10, 2021 | September 23, 2022 | 1 | Originally aired on ITV2 |
| March | January 24, 2022 | March 27, 2022 | 1 | |
| Would I Lie to You? | April 9, 2022 | July 9, 2022 | 1 | |
| Criss Angel's Magic with the Stars | October 22, 2022 | February 10, 2023 | 1 | |
| The Great American Joke Off | March 31, 2023 | June 23, 2023 | 1 | |
| Totally Weird and Funny | April 8, 2023 | June 24, 2023 | 1 | |
| 100 Days to Indy | April 27, 2023 | June 7, 2024 | 2 | Moved to Fox Nation |
| Greatest Geek Year Ever: 1982 | July 8, 2023 | July 29, 2023 | 1 | |
| Recipe for Disaster | August 5, 2023 | September 2, 2023 | 1 | |
| Fight to Survive | August 10, 2023 | September 28, 2023 | 1 | Co-production with The Roku Channel |
| Inside the NFL (seasons 47–48) | September 5, 2023 | February 12, 2025 | 2 | Originally aired on HBO (1977–2008), Showtime (2008–2021), and Paramount+ (2021–2023) |
| FBoy Island (season 3) | October 16, 2023 | December 8, 2023 | 1 | Originally aired on HBO Max |
| Totally Funny Kids | February 16, 2024 | August 8, 2025 | 1 | |
| Crime Nation | February 20, 2024 | June 19, 2025 | 2 | |
| Lovers and Liars | April 1, 2024 | May 23, 2024 | 1 | The last three episodes of the series were released exclusively on The CW App on in May 2024. |
| Patti Stanger: The Matchmaker | April 11, 2024 | June 13, 2024 | 1 | |
| Hostage Rescue | May 14, 2024 | June 18, 2024 | 1 | |
| The Big Bakeover | June 14, 2024 | July 19, 2024 | 1 | |
| The Wranglers | October 14, 2024 | October 28, 2024 | 1 | |
| I Am (season 2) | February 22, 2025 | March 8, 2025 | 1 | Originally aired on Paramount Network |
| TV We Love | October 13, 2025 | December 1, 2025 | 1 | |
| The Great American Road Rally: Celebrity Edition | September 16, 2026 | November 11, 2026 | 1 | |

=== Sports programming ===
| Title | Genre | Broadcast | Notes |
|---|---|---|---|
| WWE SmackDown | Sports entertainment | 2006–2008 | Originally aired on UPN; Later moved to various networks |
| WWE Saturday Morning Slam | Sports entertainment | 2012–2013 | Aired on Saban Brands' Vortexx block |
| LIV Golf | Sports broadcast | 2023–2024 | Moved to Fox Sports |
| Grand Slam Track | Sports broadcast | 2025 | |
| HBCU All-Star Basketball Game | Sports broadcast | 2025 | |
| MGM Slam Tennis Tournament | Sports broadcast | 2026 | |

=== Acquired programming ===
| Title | Original network/Region | Broadcast | Number of seasons | Notes |
|---|---|---|---|---|
| 18 to Life (season 1) | CBC/Canada | 2010 | 1 | |
| 61st Street (season 1) | AMC/United States | 2023 | 1 | Season 2 was picked up by The CW as a network original series |
| Barons | ABC TV/Australia | 2023 | 1 | |
| Being Reuben | Discovery UK/United Kingdom | 2020 | 1 | |
| Bob Hearts Abishola (season 1) | CBS/United States | 2024 | 1 | |
| Bulletproof | Sky One/United Kingdom | 2019–2021 | 3 | |
| Bump (seasons 1–2) | Stan/Australia | 2022–2023 | 2 | |
| Burden of Truth | CBC/Canada | 2018–2021 | 4 | |
| Children Ruin Everything | CTV/Canada | 2023–2025 | 4 | The last four episodes of the series were released exclusively on The CW App in June 2025. |
| The Chosen (seasons 1–4) | VidAngel/United States | 2023–2024 | 4 | |
| The Conners (seasons 1–5) | ABC/United States | 2024 | 5 | |
| Coroner | CBC/Canada | 2020–2022 | 4 | |
| Dates | Channel 4/United Kingdom | 2015 | 1 | |
| Dead Pixels | E4/United Kingdom | 2020–2021 | 2 | |
| Devils | Sky Atlantic/Italy | 2020–2022 | 2 | |
| Down to Earth with Zac Efron (season 1) | Netflix/United States | 2023 | 1 | |
| Easy Money | MRC/United States | 2008–2009 | 1 | |
| Everyone Else Burns (season 1) | Channel 4/United Kingdom | 2023 | 1 | |
| Family Law | Global/Canada | 2022–2025 | 4 | |
| Fantastic Friends (season 1) | International syndication/United Kingdom | 2023 | 1 | |
| FBoy Island (season 2) | HBO Max/United States | 2023 | 1 | The linear network did not air season 1, which was released exclusively on The CW App in June 2023; Season 3 was picked up by The CW as a network original series |
| Fridge Wars | CBC/Canada | 2020 | 1 | |
| Gilmore Girls: A Year in the Life | Netflix/United States | 2020 | 1 | |
| Great Chocolate Showdown (seasons 1, 3–4) | Food Network/Canada | 2022–2023 | 3 | The linear network did not air season 2, which was released exclusively on The CW App in September 2022 |
| Hooten & the Lady | Sky One/United Kingdom | 2017 | 1 | |
| I Am (season 1) | Paramount Network/United States | 2023–2025 | 1 | Season 2 was picked up by The CW as a network original series. |
| I Ship It (season 2) | CW Seed/United States | 2019 | 1 | |
| In Harm's Way | MRC/United States | 2008 | 1 | |
| Killer Camp (season 1) | ITV2/United Kingdom | 2020 | 1 | Season 2 was picked up by The CW as a network original series. |
| The L.A. Complex | CTV/Canada; MuchMusic/Canada | 2012 | 2 | |
| Labyrinth | Sat.1/Germany; Film Afrika Worldwide/South Africa | 2014 | 1 | |
| Leonardo | Rai 1/Italy | 2022 | 1 | |
| Moonshine (season 1) | CBC/Canada | 2023 | 1 | The linear network did not air season 2, which was released exclusively on The CW App. Season 3 was not broadcast on either the network or the app. |
| The Outpost | Syfy International/United States | 2018–2021 | 4 | |
| Professionals | Viaplay/Nordic countries | 2022 | 1 | |
| Ride | Hallmark Channel/United States; CTV Drama Channel/Canada | 2024 | 1 | |
| The Rising | Sky Max/United Kingdom | 2023 | 1 | |
| Run the Burbs (seasons 1–2) | CBC/Canada | 2023 | 2 | |
| Seed (season 1) | Citytv/Canada | 2014 | 1 | |
| Son of a Critch (seasons 1–2) | CBC/Canada | 2023–2024 | 2 | Season 3 was picked up by The CW as a co-production with CBC |
| The Spencer Sisters | CTV/Canada | 2023 | 1 | |
| Sullivan's Crossing (season 1) | CTV/Canada | 2023 | 1 | Season 2 onward was picked up by The CW as a co-production with CTV |
| Swamp Thing | DC Universe/United States | 2020 | 1 | |
| The Swarm | ZDF/Germany | 2023 | 1 | |
| Taskmaster (season 8) | Dave/United Kingdom | 2020 | 1 | |
| Tell Me a Story | CBS All Access/United States | 2020 | 2 | |
| Trickster | CBC/Canada | 2021 | 1 | |
| Valentine | MRC/United States | 2008–2009 | 1 | |
| Wellington Paranormal | TVNZ 2/New Zealand | 2021–2022 | 4 | |

=== Daytime ===
- 4Real (2008)
- All of Us (2007–2008)
- The Bill Cunningham Show (2012–2016)
- Dr. Drew's Lifechangers (2011–2012)
- The Jamie Foxx Show (2008–2009)
- Jerry Springer (Reruns, 2018–2021)
- Judge Jeanine Pirro (2008–2009)
- Reba (2006–2008)
- The Robert Irvine Show (2016–2018)
- The Tyra Banks Show (2009–2011)
- The Wayans Bros. (2008–2009)
- What I Like About You (2006–2008)

=== Children's programming ===
- The Adventures of Chuck and Friends^{E/I} (2013–2014)
- B-Daman Crossfire (2013–2014)
- The Batman (2006–2008)
- Bolts & Blip (2013–2014)
- The Brady Barr Experience^{E/I} (2014)
- Brain Games: Family Edition^{E/I} (2017)
- Calling Dr. Pol^{E/I} (2014–2017)
- Chaotic (2008–2010)
- Chicken Soup for the Soul's Animal Tales^{E/I} (2019–2020)
- Chicken Soup for the Soul's Hidden Heroes^{E/I}(2018)
- Cubix: Robots for Everyone^{E/I} (2010–2014)
- Did I Mention Invention?^{E/I} (2018–2020)
- Digimon Fusion (2014)
- Dinner Spinner (2016–2017)
- Dinosaur King (2008–2010)
- Dog Whisperer: Family Edition^{E/I} (2014–2018)
- Dog Town, USA^{E/I} (2015–2016)
- Dragon Ball Z Kai (2010–2014)
- Dream Quest (2015–2016)
- Eon Kid (2007–2008)
- Expedition Wild^{E/I} (2014–2015)
- GoGoRiki^{E/I} (2008–2009)
- Hatched (2015–2016)
- Huntik: Secrets & Seekers (2009)
- Iron Man: Armored Adventures (2012)
- Johnny Test (2006–2008)
- Justice League Unlimited (2012–2014)
- Kamen Rider: Dragon Knight (2008–2009)
- Kirby: Right Back at Ya! (2009)
- Krypto the Superdog (2006–2007)
- Legion of Super Heroes (2006–2008)
- Loonatics Unleashed (2006–2007)
- Magi-Nation^{E/I} (2007–2008; 2011–2012)
- Magical DoReMi^{E/I} (2010)
- Monster Allergy (2006–2007)
- The New Adventures of Nanoboy^{E/I} (2013)
- Pat & Stan (2008)
- Power Rangers Lost Galaxy (2012–2013)
- Ready, Set, Pet^{E/I}(2018–2019)
- Reluctantly Healthy^{E/I} (2014)
- Rescue Me with Dr. Lisa (2016)
- Rescue Heroes^{E/I} (2012–2014)
- Rock the Park^{E/I} (2014–2015)
- RollBots (2009–2010)
- Save Our Shelter (2015–2017)
- Save to Win (2016–2017)
- Sonic X (2009–2014)
- Shaggy & Scooby-Doo Get a Clue! (2006–2008)
- Skunk Fu! (2007–2008; 2010)
- The Spectacular Spider-Man (2008–2009; 2013–2014)
- Spider Riders (2006–2007)
- Tai Chi Chasers (2011–2012)
- Teen Titans (2007–2008)
- Teenage Mutant Ninja Turtles (2008–2009)
- Tiny Toon Adventures (2012)
- Tom and Jerry Tales (2006–2008)
- Thumb Wrestling Federation (2008)
- Transformers: Prime (2012–2013)
- Unlikely Animal Friends (2016–2017)
- Vacation Creation (2016–2017)
- Viva Piñata (2008)
- Welcome Home^{E/I}(2018–2019)
- The Wildlife Docs^{E/I} (2018–2019)
- Will and Dewitt^{E/I} (2007–2009)
- Winx Club^{E/I} (2009–2010)
- World of Quest (2008)
- Xiaolin Showdown (2006–2007)
- WWE Saturday Morning Slam (2012–2013)
- Yu-Gi-Oh! (2010–2014)
- Yu-Gi-Oh! 5D's (2008–2011)
- Yu-Gi-Oh! Capsule Monsters (2012)
- Yu-Gi-Oh! GX (2008)
- Yu-Gi-Oh! Zexal (2011–2014)

== See also ==
- List of programs broadcast by The CW Plus – for programs aired by The CW's national programming feed for smaller markets
- CW Seed — for information about The CW's digital platform
- List of programs broadcast by UPN – predecessor to The CW
- List of programs broadcast by The WB – predecessor to The CW
