= Bad Romance (disambiguation) =

"Bad Romance" is a 2009 song by Lady Gaga.

Bad Romance may also refer to:

- Bad Romance (film), a Chinese film based on Gaga's song
- Bad Romance: The Series, a 2016 Thai TV series
- Bad Romance: A Special Edition of 20/20, a 2024 special news series
- "Bad Romance" (Law & Order: UK), a 2014 television episode
