= Rachel Jeffs =

American author

- Born: Rachel Jeffs; 1983 (age 42–43); Salt Lake City
- Spouses: Richard Allred (m. 2002; div. 2014) Brandon Blackmore (m. 2017)
- Children: 5 (with first husband)
- Father: Warren Jeffs
- Relatives: Rulon Jeffs (grandfather); Nephi Jeffs (uncle); Lyle Jeffs (uncle); Seth Jeffs (uncle); Brent W. Jeffs (cousin); Roy Jeffs (half-brother)

Rachel Jeffs Blackmore (born 1983, Salt Lake City) is an American author and former member of the Fundamentalist Church of Jesus Christ of Latter-Day Saints. She is the daughter of the church's prophet, convicted child sex offender Warren Jeffs.

== Life in the FLDS Church ==
Jeffs, who was born to Warren Jeffs' second wife, had 47 siblings and half-siblings. Her father sexually abused her from age eight until age 16. She received up to an eighth-grade education.

Jeffs married in 2002, at age 18, to a man chosen by Warren Jeffs; the couple met for the first time on the day of their wedding. Once she married, Jeffs lived in a home with three 'sister wives', who were also married to her husband. She gave birth to her first child in 2003, at age 19, and she worked at a school run by the church, teaching third graders. Her mother died of breast cancer in 2004.

In 2014, Jeffs was banished from her community and prevented from seeing her children for seven months for allegedly having sex with her husband while pregnant. She has credited this event, and her anger surrounding it, as the "breaking point" for deciding to leave altogether. Around this time, she also discovered that one of her sisters had also been sexually abused by Warren Jeffs, starting at age 6.

Jeffs left the church on December 31, 2014, with her five children and one of her sisters.

== Life after leaving the church ==
After leaving the church, Jeffs moved in with relatives from her mother's side of the family in Centennial Park, another polygamous community. However, Jeffs was put off by the practice of polygamy and ultimately moved away, staying at times in Salt Lake City, Texas, and Montana. She enrolled her five children in public schools, and Jeffs got her GED and started college. The family was on food stamps for a time, and Jeffs taught violin lessons to make money.

Shortly after starting college, Jeffs met Brandon Blackmore, who had also been raised in a fundamentalist Mormon community. The two began a relationship, with Jeffs providing support when Blackmore testified against his parents in November 2016, in a court case involving the marriage of his 13-year-old sister to Warren Jeffs in 2004. Jeffs and Blackmore married in September 2017.

Jeffs has since spoken out against her father and the religion, appearing in reality television shows such as Escaping Polygamy, and Secrets of Polygamy. She later moved to Idaho and identifies as a Christian.

One of her siblings, Roy Jeffs, also left the religion and died by suicide in 2019. Another sibling, Helaman Jeffs, is still a high-ranking member of the church. Ammon Jeffs, one of Rachel's full-blooded siblings, left the church in 2023 and published his memoir the following year.

== Bibliography ==
- Breaking Free: How I Escaped Polygamy, the FLDS Cult, and My Father, Warren Jeffs (2017)
