= The Interrogation Tapes: A Special Edition of 20/20 =

2024 television documentary series

- Genre: Documentary
- Presented by: Ryan Smith; Brian Buckmire; Jami Floyd
- Country of origin: United States
- No. of series: 1
- No. of episodes: 6

Production
- Executive producers: Janice Johnston; Eamon Mcniff; Remy Weber; Lisa Soloway; David Sloan
- Production company: ABC News

Original release
- Network: ABC
- Release: April 1 – April 29, 2024

The Interrogation Tapes: A Special Edition of 20/20 (also known as The Interrogation Tapes) is an American six-part television documentary series that premiered on ABC on April 1, 2024.

== Episodes ==
No.	Title	Original release date	Prod. code	U.S. viewers (millions)	Rating (18–49)
1	"With Friends Like These"	April 1, 2024	101	N/A	TBA
2	"The Clique"	April 8, 2024	102	N/A	TBA
3	"The Devil in Disguise"	April 15, 2024	103	N/A	TBA
4	"Sins of the Father"	April 22, 2024	104	N/A	TBA
5	"Mystery on the Hudson"	April 23, 2024	105	1.70	0.2
6	"Stranger Than Fiction: The Murder of Angie Dodge"	April 29, 2024	106	N/A	TBA
