= Bad Romance: A Special Edition of 20/20 =

2024 television documentary series

- Genre: Documentary
- Presented by: Ryan Smith
- Country of origin: United States
- No. of seasons: 2
- No. of episodes: 16

Production
- Executive producer: Janice Johnston
- Production company: ABC News

Original release
- Network: ABC
- Release: January 22, 2024 – present

Bad Romance: A Special Edition of 20/20 (also known as Bad Romance) is an American television documentary series that premiered on ABC on January 22, 2024.

On March 13, 2025, the series was renewed for a second season which premiered on March 25, 2025.

== Episodes ==
=== Series overview ===
Season	Episodes	Originally released	
Season	Episodes	First released	Last released
1	8	January 22, 2024	March 11, 2024
2	8	March 25, 2025	May 19, 2025

=== Season 1 (2024) ===
No. overall	No. in season	Title	Original release date	Prod. code	U.S. viewers (millions)	Rating (18–49)
1	1	"Dangerous Game"	January 22, 2024	101	2.04	0.2
2	2	"No Trace"	January 29, 2024	102	1.60	0.2
3	3	"Shot in the Dark"	February 5, 2024	103	1.69	0.2
4	4	"Tangled Web"	February 12, 2024	104	1.80	0.2
5	5	"Deadly Night"	February 19, 2024	105	1.55	0.2
6	6	"Shattered Love"	February 26, 2024	106	1.90	0.2
7	7	"Dark Waters"	March 4, 2024	107	1.79	0.3
8	8	"Death at the Door"	March 11, 2024	108	2.05	0.2

=== Season 2 (2025) ===
No. overall	No. in season	Title	Original release date	Prod. code	U.S. viewers (millions)	Rating (18–49)
9	1	"No Tomorrow"	March 25, 2025	201	1.85	0.2
10	2	"Web of Lies"	April 1, 2025	202	1.59	0.1
11	3	"Love You to Death"	April 8, 2025	203	1.80	0.2
12	4	"Barefoot Witness"	April 15, 2025	204	1.60	0.1
13	5	"Doomsday's Bride"	May 6, 2025	208	1.36	0.1
14	6	"Betrayed"	May 9, 2025	205	1.60	0.2
15	7	"Love at First Click"	May 13, 2025	206	1.43	0.1
16	8	"The Gabby Petito Story: Vanishing Point"	May 19, 2025	207	2.04	0.2
