= TMZ Investigates =

2020 television documentary series

- Genre: Documentary
- Country of origin: United States
- Original language: English
- No. of episodes: 8 (and 14 specials)

Production
- Executive producers: Harvey Levin; Ryan Regan; Don Nash; Charles Latibeaudiere; Jess Fusco
- Production companies: TMZ Studios; Harvey Levin Productions; Fox Alternative Entertainment

Original release
- Network: Fox
- Release: January 22, 2024 – present

TMZ Investigates is an American television documentary series that premiered on Fox on January 22, 2024.

Before the series debut, 10 TMZ Investigates specials aired on Fox starting on April 13, 2020.

== Episodes ==
=== Series overview ===
Season	Episodes	Originally released	
Season	Episodes	First released	Last released
Specials	15	April 13, 2020	January 9, 2026
1	8	January 22, 2024	June 16, 2024

=== Specials (2020–25) ===
No.	Title	Original release date	Prod. code	U.S. viewers (millions)	Rating (18-49)
1	"Tiger King - What Really Went Down?"	April 13, 2020	SP-2020	3.60	1.0
2	"UFOs: The Pentagon Proof"	June 29, 2021	SP-2119	1.78	0.4
3	"What Really Happened to Richard Simmons"	August 22, 2022	SP-2301	2.35	0.3
4	"Who Really Killed Michael Jackson"	September 6, 2022	SP-2302	1.65	0.3
5	"Lisa Marie Presley: Unending Tragedy"	January 30, 2023	SP-2306	2.54	0.4
6	"9/11: The Fifth Plane"	March 20, 2023	SP-2307	2.08	0.3
7	"Britney Spears: The Price of Freedom"	May 15, 2023	SP-2309	1.23	0.2
8	"The Miracle Children of the Amazon"	June 22, 2023	SP-2310	1.45	0.2
9	"Gilgo Beach Serial Murders: Missed Warning Signs"	August 20, 2023	SP-2402	0.85	0.1
10	"Britney Spears: Divorce & Despair"	August 24, 2023	SP-2303	1.10	0.2
11	"Matthew Perry & the Secret Celebrity Drug Ring"	September 16, 2024	SP-2502	0.94	0.1
12	"Liam Payne: Who's to Blame?"	December 16, 2024	SP-2507	0.81	0.1
13	"Luigi Mangione: The Mind of a Killer"	January 6, 2025	SP-2509	1.30	0.2
14	"What Happened to Justin Bieber?"	May 14, 2025	SP-2513	0.87	0.1
15	"The Reiner Murders: What REALLY Happened"	January 9, 2026	SP-2607	N/A	TBA

=== Season 1 (2024) ===
No.	Title	Original release date	Prod. code	U.S. viewers (millions)	Rating (18-49)
1	"Obsessed and Dangerous: Hollywood's Stalker Crisis"	January 22, 2024	TZI-101	1.48	0.2
2	"Killing a Movie Star: Grave Injustice"	January 29, 2024	TZI-102	1.38	0.2
3	"Kanye West: Unhinged But Unstoppable"	February 5, 2024	TZI-103	1.16	0.2
4	"Killer OnlyFans Model: Deadly Love Story"	February 12, 2024	TZI-104	1.13	0.2
5	"Kevin Costner's Divorce War"	February 19, 2024	TZI-105	1.36	0.2
6	"Taylor & Travis: Ultimate Love Story"	February 26, 2024	TZI-106	1.08	0.2
7	"Where is Kate Middleton?"	March 21, 2024	TZI-107	1.29	0.2
8	"JLo & Ben: Missed Warning Signs"	June 16, 2024	TZI-108	0.62	0.1
