= Film Afrika =

South African film production company

Film Afrika is a South African film and television production company. It was established in 1982 by film producer, David Wicht.

== Past Productions ==
According to Deadline Hollywood:

- Black Sails (2014-2017) (4 seasons)
- Mandela: Long Walk to Freedom (2013)
- Chronicle (2012)
- America: The Story of Us (2010) (12 episodes)
- The No. 1 Ladies' Detective Agency (2008–2009)
- Country of My Skull (2004)
- Raised by Wolves
- Promised Land (2002)
- Safe House

== Philanthropy ==
In 2021, Film Afrika donated surveillance cameras to Cape town's District Six, for filming in the area.
