= FBI True =

2023 American documentary television series

- Genre: Docuseries
- Country of origin: United States
- Original language: English
- No. of seasons: 7
- No. of episodes: 82

Production
- Executive producers: Solly Granatstein; Shawn Efran; Craig Turk; Anne Beagan; Azadeh de Leon; Susan Zirinsky; Terence Wrong
- Producer: Mike Schultz
- Running time: 30 minutes (paired episodes, 60 minutes, on CBS)
- Production companies: Efran Films Canada; Anne Beagan Productions; Thinking Hat Inc.; See It Now Studios

Original release
- Network: Paramount+
- Release: February 28 – June 20, 2023
- Network: CBS
- Release: November 7, 2023 – February 14, 2024
- Network: Paramount+
- Release: October 15, 2025 – present

FBI True is an American documentary television series that provides an in-depth look at real-life FBI investigations, featuring firsthand accounts from agents who worked on high-stakes cases involving kidnappings, terrorism, and serial crime. Through candid conversations and behind-the-scenes storytelling, FBI True offers viewers a rare glimpse into the inner workings of the Federal Bureau of Investigation, highlighting the challenges and dangers agents face in the line of duty. The series aims to present these stories with authenticity, demonstrated by how former agents discuss their experiences with one another.

- The first season premiered on Paramount+ on February 28, 2023.
- On April 6, 2023, the series was renewed for a second season which premiered on April 11, 2023.
- On June 13, 2023, the series was renewed for a third season which premiered on June 20, 2023.
- On October 26, 2023, the series was renewed for a fourth season which premiered on CBS on November 7, 2023.
- On October 2, 2024, the series returned to Paramount+ and was renewed for a fifth season which premiered on October 15, 2024.
- On October 2, 2024, the series was renewed for a sixth season which premiered on January 14, 2025.
- On April 20, 2025, Paramount announced the seventh season which premiered on May 20, 2025.
- The eighth season premiered on March 31, 2026.

== Episodes ==
Season	Episodes	Originally released		
Season	Episodes	First released	Last released	Network
1	10	February 28, 2023		Paramount+
2	10	April 11, 2023		Paramount+
3	10	June 20, 2023		Paramount+
4	18	November 7, 2023	February 14, 2024	CBS
5	10	October 15, 2024		Paramount+
6	12	January 14, 2025		Paramount+
7	12	May 19, 2025		Paramount+
8	10	March 31, 2026		Paramount+

=== Season 1 (2023) ===
No.	Title	Original release date	CBS air date	U.S. linear viewers (millions)	Rating (18–49)
1	"The Manhattan Bomber"	February 28, 2023	October 10, 2023	2.13	0.3
2016 New York and New Jersey bombings
2	"Horror In Yosemite"	February 28, 2023	October 31, 2023	2.01	0.2
Cary Stayner
3	"Terror In Benghazi"	February 28, 2023	TBA	TBA	TBA
2012 Benghazi attack
4	"The Kidnapping of Hannah Anderson"	February 28, 2023	October 10, 2023	2.13	0.3
5	"Waco"	February 28, 2023	January 3, 2024	1.54	0.2
6	"Waco"	February 28, 2023	January 3, 2024	1.54	0.2
Waco siege
7	"Hunting Whitey Bulger"	February 28, 2023	October 26, 2023	1.52	0.1
8	"The Beltway Snipers"	February 28, 2023	October 31, 2023	2.01	0.2
9	"The Boy in the Bunker"	February 28, 2023	October 3, 2023	2.45	0.2
10	"The Boy in the Bunker"	February 28, 2023	October 3, 2023	2.45	0.2
2013 Alabama bunker hostage crisis

=== Season 2 (2023) ===
No. overall	No. in season	Title	Original release date	CBS air date	U.S. linear viewers (millions)	Rating (18–49)
11	1	"Boston Marathon Manhunt"	April 11, 2023	October 24, 2023	1.80	0.2
12	2	"Boston Marathon Manhunt"	April 11, 2023	October 24, 2023	1.80	0.2
Boston Marathon bombing
13	3	"Gangs of Newburgh"	April 11, 2023	October 26, 2023	1.52	0.1
14	4	"The Outlaws Biker Bust"	April 11, 2023	TBA	TBA	TBA
Two FBI agents infiltrate a violent motorcycle gang in Taunton, Massachusetts.
15	5	"The Southside Bandit"	April 11, 2023	TBA	TBA	TBA
2010 Bank robbery in Newton, Massachusetts
16	6	"Mob Cops"	April 11, 2023	TBA	TBA	TBA
Stephen Caracappa and Louis Eppolito
17	7	"Attack on Oklahoma"	April 11, 2023	January 10, 2024	1.72	0.2
18	8	"Attack on Oklahoma"	April 11, 2023	January 10, 2024	1.72	0.2
Oklahoma City bombing
19	9	"The Golden State Killer"	April 11, 2023	October 17, 2023	1.41	0.2
Joseph James DeAngelo
20	10	"The San Bernardino Mass Shooting"	April 11, 2023	TBA	TBA	TBA
2015 San Bernardino attack

=== Season 3 (2023) ===
No. overall	No. in season	Title	Original release date	CBS air date	U.S. linear viewers (millions)	Rating (18–49)
21	1	"The Rise of Al Qaeda"	June 20, 2023	December 19, 2023	2.20	0.1
22	2	"The Rise of Al Qaeda"	June 20, 2023	December 19, 2023	2.20	0.1
1998 United States embassy bombings in Dar es Salaam and Nairobi
23	3	"The Hitman"	June 20, 2023	January 17, 2024	1.47	0.2
Joseph Burke
24	4	"Fire in the Sky: TWA Flight 800"	June 20, 2023	TBA	TBA	TBA
25	5	"The Corrupt Senator"	June 20, 2023	TBA	TBA	TBA
Dianne Wilkerson
26	6	"The Bronx Butcher"	June 20, 2023	TBA	TBA	TBA
Smail Tulja
27	7	"Cartel Kidnapping"	June 20, 2023	TBA	TBA	TBA
Kidnapping of Cory Still from St. Matthews, South Carolina
28	8	"Hostages at Sea"	June 20, 2023	January 17, 2024	1.47	0.2
SY Quest incident
29	9	"Al Qaeda in Queens"	June 20, 2023	TBA	TBA	TBA
30	10	"Home Depot Bomb Plot"	June 20, 2023	TBA	TBA	TBA
Daniel Patrick Sheehan

=== Season 4 (2023–24) ===
No. overall	No. in season	Title	Original release date	U.S. viewers (millions)	Rating (18–49)
31	1	"Operation Knockout: The Biggest Takedown"	November 7, 2023	1.83	0.2
Varrio Hawaiian Gardens street gang
32	2	"Terror in Times Square: Chasing a Madman"	November 7, 2023	1.83	0.2
2010 Times Square car bombing attempt
33	3	"Ruby Ridge: The Real Story"	November 14, 2023	1.69	0.1
34	4	"Ruby Ridge: The Real Story"	November 14, 2023	1.69	0.1
Ruby Ridge standoff
35	5	"Hunting GRAYSUIT: America's Deadliest Traitor"	November 21, 2023	1.65	0.1
36	6	"Hunting GRAYSUIT: America's Deadliest Traitor"	November 21, 2023	1.65	0.1
Robert Hanssen
37	7	"The Disappearance of Chyenne Kircher"	November 28, 2023	2.23	0.2
38	8	"The Disappearance of Chyenne Kircher"	November 28, 2023	2.23	0.2
39	9	"Chasing the Olympic Bomber"	December 5, 2023	2.19	0.2
40	10	"Chasing the Olympic Bomber"	December 5, 2023	2.19	0.2
41	11	"The Heist: Undercover Among the Art Thieves"	January 24, 2024	1.62	0.2
National Museum of Denmark art heist
42	12	"FIFA: Sports' Biggest Scandal"	January 24, 2024	1.62	0.2
2018 FIFA World Cup corruption
43	13	"Hunting a Terrorist Mastermind"	January 31, 2024	1.45	0.2
1993 World Trade Center bombing
44	14	"Stopping a Sniper"	January 31, 2024	1.45	0.2
Murder of Barnett Slepian
45	15	"Seattle Sex Trafficker: "You're Gonna Be Rich""	February 7, 2024	1.46	0.2
46	16	"Finding Aldrich Ames: The Hunt for a Mole"	February 7, 2024	1.46	0.2
47	17	"The Birmingham Church Bombing: The Long Arc of Justice"	February 14, 2024	1.73	0.2
48	18	"The Birmingham Church Bombing: The Long Arc of Justice"	February 14, 2024	1.73	0.2

=== Season 5 (2024) ===
No. overall	No. in season	Title	Original release date	CBS air date	U.S. linear viewers (millions)	Rating (18–49)
49	1	"Showdown in the West"	October 15, 2024	TBA	TBA	TBA
50	2	"Showdown in the West"	October 15, 2024	TBA	TBA	TBA
Occupation of the Malheur National Wildlife Refuge
51	3	"Love & Murder in Old San Juan"	October 15, 2024	TBA	TBA	TBA
Murder of Adam Anhang
52	4	"Operation Oxy Alley"	October 15, 2024	TBA	TBA	TBA
Christopher Paul George
53	5	"Who Bombed Pan Am 103?"	October 15, 2024	TBA	TBA	TBA
54	6	"McDonald's Monopoly Scam"	October 15, 2024	TBA	TBA	TBA
55	7	"McDonald's Monopoly Scam"	October 15, 2024	TBA	TBA	TBA
56	8	"Bernie Madoff"	October 15, 2024	TBA	TBA	TBA
57	9	"Officer Pulido"	October 15, 2024	TBA	TBA	TBA
Roberto Pulido
58	10	"Sea of Thieves"	October 15, 2024	TBA	TBA	TBA

=== Season 6 (2025) ===
No. overall	No. in season	Title	Original release date	CBS air date	U.S. linear viewers (millions)	Rating (18–49)
59	1	"Pizza Bomber"	January 14, 2025	TBA	N/A	TBA
60	2	"Pizza Bomber"	January 14, 2025	TBA	N/A	TBA
Death of Brian Wells
61	3	"A Genius Disappears: The Annie Le Story"	January 14, 2025	TBA	N/A	TBA
Murder of Annie Le
62	4	"Versace Murder in Miami"	January 14, 2025	TBA	N/A	TBA
Gianni Versace
63	5	"Who's Killing Our Heroes?"	January 14, 2025	TBA	N/A	TBA
64	6	"Who's Killing Our Heroes?"	January 14, 2025	TBA	N/A	TBA
Reta Mays
65	7	"Con Man Killer"	January 14, 2025	TBA	N/A	TBA
Scott Lee Kimball
66	8	"Follow the Drug Money: Operation Recoil"	January 14, 2025	TBA	N/A	TBA
67	9	"Follow the Drug Money: Operation Recoil"	January 14, 2025	TBA	N/A	TBA
Sal Magluta
68	10	"Scream Bandits"	January 14, 2025	TBA	N/A	TBA
2015 Denver bank robberies
69	11	"The Base: Taking Down America's Most Dangerous Hate Group"	January 14, 2025	TBA	N/A	TBA
70	12	"The Base: Taking Down America's Most Dangerous Hate Group"	January 14, 2025	TBA	N/A	TBA
The Base (hate group)

=== Season 7 (2025) ===
No. overall	No. in season	Title	Original release date	CBS air date	U.S. linear viewers (millions)	Rating (18–49)
71	1	"Opening the Door to Hell"	May 19, 2025	TBA	N/A	TBA
72	2	"Opening the Door to Hell"	May 19, 2025	TBA	N/A	TBA
Murder of Leslie Mahaffy
73	3	"Kidnapped in Pleasantville"	May 19, 2025	TBA	N/A	TBA
Kidnapping of the van Oosten family
74	4	"International Man of Murder"	May 19, 2025	TBA	N/A	TBA
75	5	"International Man of Murder"	May 19, 2025	TBA	N/A	TBA
Jack Unterweger
76	6	"Betting the House"	May 19, 2025	TBA	N/A	TBA
Harvey's Resort Hotel bombing
77	7	"The Xerox Killer"	May 19, 2025	TBA	N/A	TBA
1999 Honolulu shootings
78	8	"Angels & Monsters"	May 19, 2025	TBA	N/A	TBA
79	9	"Angels & Monsters"	May 19, 2025	TBA	N/A	TBA
Murders of Skyla Whitaker and Taylor Placker
80	10	"Operation Shattered Shield"	May 19, 2025	TBA	N/A	TBA
Len Davis
81	11	"Operation Mean Streets"	May 19, 2025	TBA	N/A	TBA
82	12	"Operation Mean Streets"	May 19, 2025	TBA	N/A	TBA
MS-13

=== Season 8 (2026) ===
No. overall	No. in season	Title	Original release date	CBS air date	U.S. linear viewers (millions)	Rating (18–49)
83	1	"Gannon is Missing"	March 31, 2026	TBA	N/A	TBA
84	2	"Gannon is Missing"	March 31, 2026	TBA	N/A	TBA
Disappearance and murder of Gannon Stauch
85	3	"Where is Yingying Zhang?"	March 31, 2026	TBA	N/A	TBA
Murder of Yingying Zhang
86	4	"Held Captive in the Synagogue"	March 31, 2026	TBA	N/A	TBA
2022 Colleyville synagogue hostage crisis
87	5	"Gotti: Last Shot at the Teflon Don"	March 31, 2026	TBA	N/A	TBA
88	6	"Gotti: Last Shot at the Teflon Don"	March 31, 2026	TBA	N/A	TBA
John Gotti and the murder of Paul Castellano
89	7	"The Killer Who Stayed for Dinner"	March 31, 2026	TBA	N/A	TBA
Murder of Diane Zeleski
90	8	"Terror in Austin"	March 31, 2026	TBA	N/A	TBA
91	9	"Terror in Austin"	March 31, 2026	TBA	N/A	TBA
Austin serial bombings
92	10	"Chaos in the Hurricane"	March 31, 2026	TBA	N/A	TBA
Aftermath and FBI response to Hurricane Katrina

== Broadcast ==
Repeats of the first three seasons were broadcast on CBS on October 3, 2023.
