= Ryan Smith (sports anchor) =

American anchor and legal analyst (born 1970)

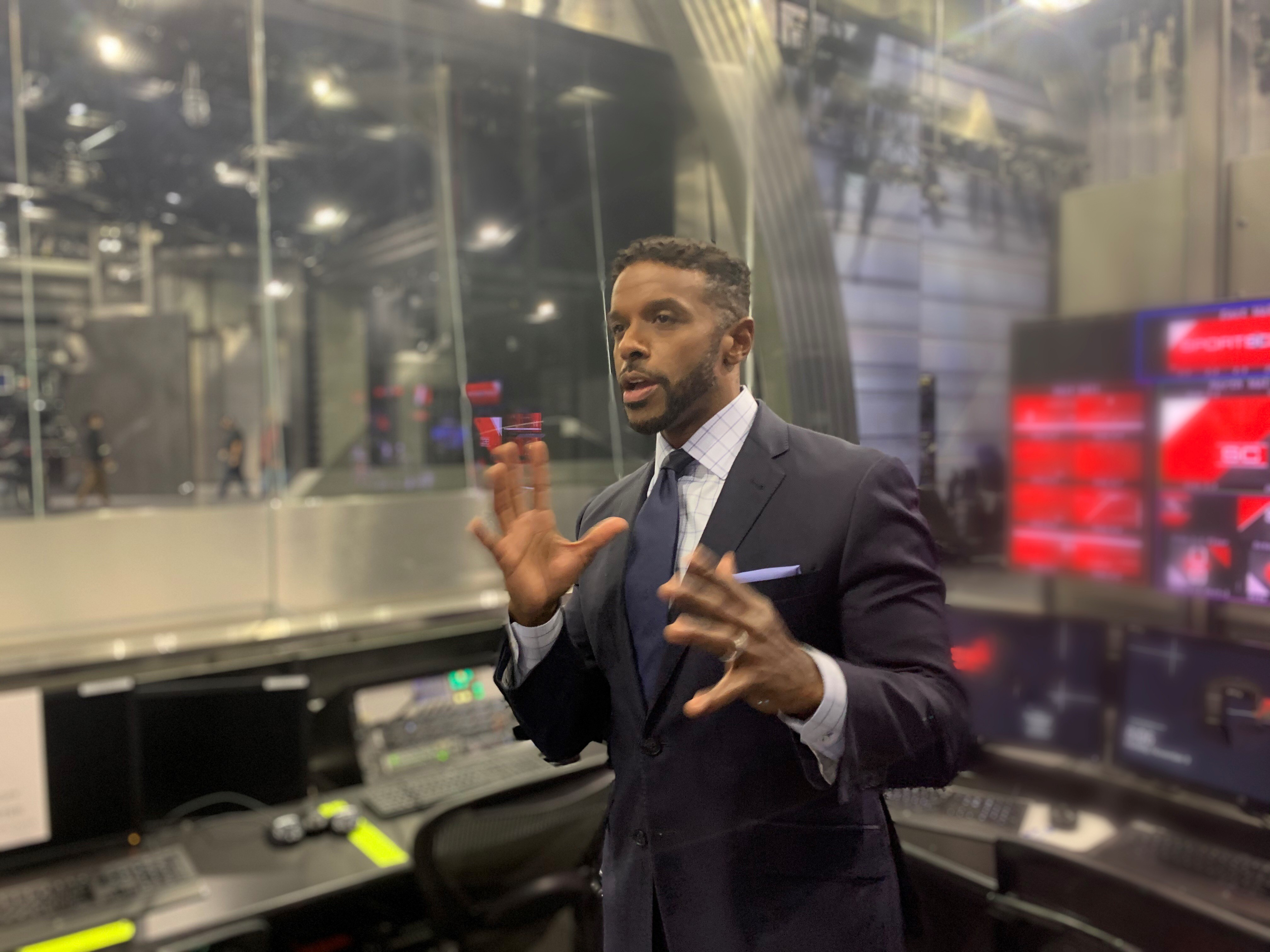
- Born: November 28, 1970 (age 55); United States
- Education: Columbia Law School; Syracuse University
- Occupation: Sports Anchor for ESPN

J. Ryan Smith (born November 28, 1970) is an American sports anchor for ESPN’s SportsCenter and Outside the Lines.

He also serves as a legal analyst and correspondent for ESPN and ABC News. He frequently appears across multiple ESPN platforms, and ABC News programming such as Good Morning America, 20/20, World News Tonight, Nightline and This Week.

== Early life and education ==
Ryan Smith grew up in Philadelphia, Pennsylvania. He graduated from Central High School in Philadelphia, and received a B.A. degree in political science from Syracuse University's Maxwell School of Citizenship and Public Affairs in 1992. He received a J.D. from Columbia Law School.

== Legal practice ==
Smith started his legal career as Director of Football Administration and Counsel for the NFL's Jacksonville Jaguars. He next practiced law in New York, New York, at Paul, Weiss, Rifkind, Wharton & Garrison LLP, and later at Frankfurt Kurnit Klein & Selz. He started his own firm, J Ryan and Associates, and eventually became a partner at Zuber Lawler.

== Television career ==
Prior to turning to television full-time, Smith hosted "Underdog to Wonderdog", a reality-based television program about the rescue of abused and abandoned dogs.

In 2005, he was on the third season of The Bachelorette, being eliminated in the second episode.

In September 2010, he began hosting “In Session”, formerly Court TV, on the TruTV Network.

In 2011, Smith added the role of news contributor for Morning Express with Robin Meade to his duties. In 2012, Smith began hosting Evening Express, a nightly news program for HLN, and later co-hosting HLN’s primetime show, HLN After Dark, covering courtroom trials across the country with an expert panel and an in-studio “jury” of trial watchers. While at HLN, Smith reported on a variety of major news stories, including the Sandy Hook Elementary School shooting, and the criminal trials of Casey Anthony, George Zimmerman, Jodi Arias, Warren Jeffs, and Conrad Murray, involving the death of Michael Jackson.

In January 2014, Smith began working as a correspondent and legal analyst for ABC News and ESPN. At ABC, he reported on several stories including the scandal surrounding former L.A. Clippers owner Donald Sterling, Colin Kaepernick, and the movement of players kneeling during the national anthem. Smith has also reported on scores of criminal cases for ABC’s 20/20, including the death of Cecil the Lion's in Zimbabwe, earning him a Genesis Award in 2016, and the exoneration of Mario Casciaro. In 2017, Smith began work as a fill-in anchor on Outside the Lines and E:60 at ESPN. He won a Sports Emmy as part of E:60 in 2018. Smith has done profiles on several athletes including Myles Garrett and Steve McNair.

== Personal life ==
Smith lives in Connecticut with his wife, Dafina, Founder & CEO of Covet & Mane and their twin sons.
