= I Am (film series) =

Documentary film series

I Am is a series of documentary films about various prominent celebrity and political figures produced by Canadian company Network Entertainment, most of which were originally commissioned by United States cable network Paramount Network (formerly Spike TV).

== Background ==
The series has regularly aired on Crave in Canada, and was picked up for broadcast by The CW in the U.S. beginning in winter 2023. In February 2024, The CW signed a multi-year licensing agreement with Network Media Group and Network Entertainment, which included production and premiere of three new I Am titles."Network Entertainment Enters Multi-Year Licensing Agreement with The CW Network for I Am Documentary Films" (Press release). Network Entertainment Inc. 5 February 2024 – via Newswire.ca.

== Series ==
Installments in the series have included:

- I Am Bruce Lee (2012)
- I Am Chris Farley (2015)
- I Am Heath Ledger (2017)
- I Am Patrick Swayze (2019)
- I Am Jackie O (2020)

As the phrase "I Am" is generic, several other biographical documentaries with titles beginning with the words "I Am" have been produced by other companies, with no connection to the Network Entertainment series. Examples include I Am Greta (2020) and I Am: Celine Dion (2024).
