= Secrets of Polygamy =

2024 American A&E documentary series

- Genre: Documentary; True crime
- Directed by: Myles Reiff
- Country of origin: United States
- Original language: English
- No. of seasons: 1
- No. of episodes: 10

Production
- Cinematography: Igor Kosenko; Christopher Mitchell
- Editor: Brandon Dumas
- Running time: 45 minutes

Original release
- Network: A&E
- Release: January 8, 2024

Secrets of Polygamy is an American documentary series on A&E, surrounding the subject of various Mormon fundamentalist groups that follow polygamy. The series began airing on January 8, 2024.

== Premise ==
The series exposes the lives of people living in polygamous marriages within Mormon fundamentalist groups such as the Fundamentalist Church of Jesus Christ of Latter-Day Saints (FLDS), the Kingston clan (or The Order) and the Apostolic United Brethren (AUB).

== Episodes ==
No.	Title
1	"The New Prophet Part 1"
FLDS leader Warren Jeffs was sentenced to life in prison in 2011 for sexual crimes against minors, and his imprisonment has created a power vacuum that several new prophets have stepped in to try and fill.
2	"The New Prophet Part 2"
Despite his incarceration, Warren Jeffs continues to control the lives of his followers, issuing edicts that have linked to allegations of missing children within the church.
3	"Bleeding the Beast Part 1"
Members of the Kingston Clan, also known as The Order, have been convicted of incest, fraud and assault yet the group continues to thrive with a business empire estimated to be worth over a billion dollars.
4	"Bleeding the Beast Part 2"
With The Order being tipped off regarding the exercise of search warrants related to the churches illegal activities, the Utah government is called into question.
5	"Holy Bloodline"
The Order claims direct descent from Jesus Christ, three former members share their knowledge
6	"Abuse of Power"
Lu Ann Kingston, founder of Hope After Polygamy meets with former members of The Order to discuss the abuse within the group.
7	"Indoctrination"
An exploration into indoctrination being forced on the youth of The Order.
8	"Secret Militia"
The Priesthood Protection Team, an alleged group linked to the Apostolic United Brethren is investigated
9	"The Lost Boys"
Stories of the young men who are exploited for labor, given limited education, and kicked out of their communities.
10	"Child Brides"
Despite Warren Jeffs incarceration, young girls within the FLDS are still in danger of forced marriages
