= Lucky 13 (game show) =

American game show

- Genre: Game show
- Created by: Adrian Woolfe
- Directed by: Ollie Bartlett
- Presented by: Shaquille O'Neal; Gina Rodriguez
- Theme music composer: Paul Farrer
- Country of origin: United States
- Original language: English
- No. of seasons: 1
- No. of episodes: 10

Production
- Executive producers: Adrian Woolfe; Mark Wells; Glenn Coomber; Kevin Bacon; Marcus Lemonis; Aaron Stone; Alastair Burlingham; Gary Raskin; David Schiff; Scott Henry; GW Wright; Shaquille O'Neal; Colin Smeeton; Michael Parris; Gina Rodriguez
- Production locations: Worre Studios; Las Vegas, Nevada
- Editors: Jevan Ali; Mark Sangster; Mike Green
- Running time: 42 minutes
- Production companies: Studio 1; Jersey Legends Productions; I Can & I Will Productions

Original release
- Network: ABC
- Release: July 18 – September 19, 2024

Lucky 13 is an American game show that aired on ABC from July 18 to September 19, 2024. The series is hosted by Shaquille O'Neal and Gina Rodriguez.

== Format ==
Two complete games are played per episode, involving a group of 13 contestants. At the start of each game, one contestant is chosen at random and asked a series of 13 true/false questions, but is not immediately told which of their responses are correct. After answering all the questions, the contestant is given the opportunity to change any one answer if they wish, by using a Pepsi Play.

The contestant must then choose a Lucky Range that they believe contains their actual number of correct answers given, with cash values set according to the table below. If the Lucky Range is anything other than 13, they also choose a Lucky Number in that range that represents their guess at the exact number of correct answers.

Lucky Range	1-3	4-6	7-9	10-12	13
Winnings	$5,000	$15,000	$25,000	$100,000	$1,000,000
Lucky Number Winnings	$30,000	$40,000	$50,000	$125,000	-

The answers are then revealed one at a time, in a different order than they were asked. Near the end of the sequence, the hosts offer a guaranteed cash prize that is equal to a fraction of the money at stake. The contestant may accept this offer and end the game early, or reveal the rest of the answers. If the contestant has chosen the correct Lucky Range, they win the money associated with it and can receive an additional $25,000 if they have also chosen the correct Lucky Number. If their number of correct answers falls outside their Lucky Range, they leave with nothing.

== Production ==
On May 3, 2024, it was announced that ABC had picked up Lucky 13 for a premiere on July 18, 2024, as part of its summer lineup. The format was created by Adrian Woolfe, formerly of British studio and Who Wants to Be a Millionaire? creator Celador.

Lucky 13 was picked up without a traditional order, with producer Studio 1 instead pre-funding the program, and entering into a revenue sharing agreement with ABC on commercial advertising and product placement sold within. While launching as one of ABC's highest-rated premieres for a summer series, advertising revenue fell below Studio 1's expectations. On November 14, 2024, it was reported that Lucky 13 had not been renewed for a second season by ABC, and that Studio 1 was restructuring its operations "to unlock and protect the value" of the format.

== Results ==
Episode	Contestant	Pepsi Play	Predictions		Offer		Result	
Episode	Contestant	Pepsi Play	Lucky Range	Lucky Number	Offer	Decision	Correct answers	Potential prize
1	Barrett Chesley	Not Used	7-9	9	$12,500	Rejected	10	$0
1	Krista Barbour	Not Used	7-9	7	$12,500	Rejected	7	$50,000
2 (Note: Between two games, a special mini-game was played called Magically Delicious Minute sponsored by Lucky Charms, where two players, both chosen at random from the 12 or 13 contestants, must answer their respective true-or-false question related to its sponsor. No cash prizes are awarded, however. Furthermore, the sponsor's mascot, Lucky the Leprechaun, appears either on the audience or sitting on the vacant seat, which was originally sat by the contestant from the first game.) (Note: The result for this episode's Magically Delicious Minute is that the first player got it right, while the second player got it wrong.)	Warren Usui (Note: Among other game shows, Warren Usui appeared on Jeopardy! where he was a 3-day champion.)	Not Used	13	-	$80,000	Rejected	11	$0
2	Ashana Evans	Used	7-9	7	$12,500	Accepted	8	$25,000
3	Luis "Brooklyn Lou" Munoz	Used	7-9	9	$3,750	Accepted	5	$0
3	Evan Baker	Used	4-6	6	$9,750	Accepted	12	$0
4 (Note: Co-executive producer Kevin Bacon made an appearance in this episode.)	Hans von Walter	Not Used	10-12	11	$27,000	Rejected	12	$100,000
4	Stephanie Wetzstein	Used	7-9	7	$3,750	Rejected	4	$0
5 (Note: The result for this episode's Magically Delicious Minute is that the first player got it wrong, while the second player got it right.)	MarkAnthony Ball	Not Used	10-12	10	$24,000	Rejected	8	$0
5	Shannon Anderson	Used	7-9	7	$7,500	Rejected	7	$50,000
6	Jonathan Greenstein	Not Used	10-12	11	$24,000	Accepted	9	$0
6	Rachel Traxler	Not Used	7-9	7	$17,500	Accepted	8	$25,000
7	Ty Brazeal	Not Used	7-9	8	$12,500	Rejected	9	$25,000
7	Gleveen Mcbeth	Used	10-12	11	$32,000	Rejected	9	$0
8	Darren Smith	Used	7-9	9	$5,000	Rejected	10	$0
8	Benjamin Parker	Not Used	10-12	11	$40,000	Rejected	11	$125,000
9	Quay Eady	Used	7-9	9	$5,000	Accepted	4	$0
9	Ramon Vinluan	Used	7-9	9	$12,500	Rejected	8	$25,000
10	Andrew Prelusky	Used	7-9	8	$5,000	Rejected	11	$0
10	Lauren McAlpin	Used	10-12	10	$14,000	Accepted	6	$0

The contestant guessed the correct Lucky Range or Number or won the $1 million prize.
The contestant took the offer and it was the right decision.
The contestant took the offer but it was the wrong decision, regardless of whether or not the contestant guessed the correct Lucky Number.
The contestant left with nothing.

== Episodes ==
No.	Title	Original release date	Prod. code	U.S. viewers (millions)	Rating (18-49)
1	"Betting on Yourself"	July 18, 2024	101	2.73	0.3/4
2	"House Money"	July 25, 2024	102	2.82	0.3/4
3	"That's a Rap"	August 8, 2024	103	1.74	0.2/2
4	"Six Degrees"	August 15, 2024	104	2.43	0.3/4
5	"High Roller"	August 27, 2024	105	1.33	0.1/2
6	"Feeling Lucky"	August 29, 2024	106	2.08	0.2/2
7	"Go Big or Go Home"	September 5, 2024	107	1.78	0.2/2
8	"Doubling Down"	September 12, 2024	108	1.87	0.2/2
9	"Playing to Win"	September 19, 2024	110	2.24	0.2/2
10	"High Stakes"	September 19, 2024	109	1.83	0.2/2
