= The Real CSI: Miami =

2024 television documentary series

- Genre: Documentary; Crime drama; Police procedural
- Created by: Anthony E. Zuiker
- Based on: CSI: Miami by Anthony E. Zuiker, Ann Donahue and Carol Mendelsohn
- Country of origin: United States
- Original language: English
- No. of seasons: 1
- No. of episodes: 10

Production
- Executive producers: Anthony E. Zuiker; Jerry Bruckheimer; KristieAnne Reed; Ann Donahue; Carol Mendelsohn; Jo Sharon; Casey Kriley; John Henshaw
- Production companies: Jerry Bruckheimer Television; Magical Elves; Buster Productions

Original release
- Network: CBS
- Release: June 26 – September 4, 2024

Related
- CSI

The Real CSI: Miami is an American crime drama television documentary series that premiered on June 26, 2024 on CBS. This series is based on the drama series CSI: Miami, which aired from 2002 until 2012 on the same channel. The series is a true-crime docuseries that features real-life cases and the forensic techniques used to solve them.

== Episodes ==
No.	Title	Original release date	Prod. code	U.S. viewers (millions)	Rating/share (18-49)
1	"Chapter One: The Catch"	June 26, 2024	102	2.06	0.2/2
2	"Chapter Two: Game Over"	July 3, 2024	110	1.71	0.1/2
3	"Chapter Three: XXXTentacion"	July 10, 2024	103	2.00	0.2/3
4	"Chapter Four: Death of a Hurricane"	July 10, 2024	108	1.69	0.2/3
5	"Chapter Five: Out of Thin Air"	July 24, 2024	104	1.46	0.1/2
6	"Chapter Six: Halliburton Horror"	July 31, 2024	101	1.52	0.2/2
7	"Chapter Seven: Dire Straits"	August 7, 2024	109	1.52	0.2/2
8	"Chapter Eight: Lady in the Lagoon"	August 14, 2024	107	1.93	0.2/3
9	"Chapter Nine: The Miramar Murders"	August 28, 2024	106	1.34	0.2/3
10	"Chapter Ten: Killer Clown"	September 4, 2024	105	1.83	0.2/3
