= Crime Nation =

2024 television documentary series

- Genre: Docuseries
- Country of origin: United States
- Original language: English
- No. of seasons: 2
- No. of episodes: 20 (and 10 specials)

Production
- Executive producers: James Goldston; Steven Baker; Mike Sheridan
- Production company: Candle True Stories

Original release
- Network: The CW
- Release: February 20, 2024 – June 19, 2025

Crime Nation is an American television true crime docuseries that premiered February 20, 2024, on The CW.

The second season premiered on January 23, 2025.

== Episodes ==
=== Series overview ===
Season	Episodes	Originally released	
Season	Episodes	First released	Last released
1	10	February 20, 2024	April 30, 2024
2	10	January 23, 2025	March 27, 2025
Specials	10	April 3, 2025	June 19, 2025

=== Season 1 (2024) ===
No. overall	No. in season	Title	Case	Original release date	Prod. code	U.S. viewers (millions)	Rating (18–49)
1	1	"A Town Torn Apart by Murder"	Murders of Abigail Williams and Liberty German	February 20, 2024	103	0.47	0.1
2	2	"The Guard and the Inmate: Love on the Run"	Casey White prison escape	February 27, 2024	101	0.34	0.1
3	3	"Fatal Devotion"	Vallow–Daybell murders	March 5, 2024	105	0.28	0.0
4	4	"Dynasty of Death"	Alex Murdaugh trial	March 12, 2024	106	0.34	0.0
5	5	"Gilgo Beach Murders"	Gilgo Beach serial killings	March 19, 2024	104	0.42	0.1
Over the years, the bodies of multiple victims were discovered in Long Island's south shores. In 2022, police arrested a man, but questions remain.
6	6	"Web of Shadows"	Killing of Gabby Petito	March 26, 2024	102	0.37	0.1
7	7	"Where is My Sister?"	Drew Peterson	April 2, 2024	108	0.34	0.1
8	8	"Vanished: A Spring Break Nightmare"	Murder of Brittanee Drexel	April 16, 2024	107	0.41	0.1
9	9	"Death in the Ozarks"	Murder of Rebekah Gould	April 23, 2024	109	0.37	0.0
10	10	"Murder in a College Town"	2022 University of Idaho killings	April 30, 2024	110	0.33	0.0

=== Season 2 (2025) ===
No. overall	No. in season	Title	Case	Original release date	Prod. code	U.S. viewers (millions)	Rating (18–49)
11	1	"Killed for Custody"	Murder of Joshua Niles & Amber Washburn	January 23, 2025	205	0.39	0.1
A young couple are gunned down in their driveway in Sodus, New York sparking a nationwide manhunt for the killers.
12	2	"Our Mom is Missing: The Jennifer Dulos Story"	Murder of Jennifer Dulos	January 30, 2025	201	0.38	0.0
13	3	"Fatal Foul: The Murder of Lorenzen Wright"	Murder of Lorenzen Wright	February 6, 2025	202	0.27	0.0
14	4	"Kansas Moms Killings"	Killings of Veronica Butler and Jilian Kelley	February 13, 2025	207	0.32	0.0
15	5	"Drugs, Death, and Deceit"	Murder of Michael Kerkowski & Tammy Fassett	February 20, 2025	203	0.33	0.0
16	6	"When Murder Calls"	Murder of Yolanda Holmes	February 27, 2025	204	0.34	0.0
17	7	"Dying for Fame"	Murder of Christian Obumseli	March 6, 2025	206	0.37	0.0
18	8	"My Deadly Ex"	Murder of Rosalio Gutierrez Jr.	March 13, 2025	208	0.32	0.0
19	9	"The Devil You Know"	Murder of Taylor Wright	March 20, 2025	209	0.30	0.0
20	10	"The (Almost) Perfect Crime"	Murder of Katelyn Markham	March 27, 2025	210	0.39	0.0

=== Specials ===
No.	Title	Case	Original release date	Prod. code	U.S. viewers (millions)	Rating (18–49)
1	"Long Island Murders"	Gilgo Beach serial killings	April 3, 2025	104A	0.28	0.0
2	"Gabby Petito"	Killing of Gabby Petito	April 10, 2025	102A	0.25	0.0
3	"Double Murder in Delphi"	Murders of Abigail Williams and Liberty German	April 17, 2025	103A	0.31	0.0
4	"Love on the Run"	Casey White prison escape	April 24, 2025	101A	0.38	0.1
5	"Spring Break Murder"	Murder of Brittanee Drexel	May 15, 2025	107A	0.36	0.1
6	"Stacy Peterson"	Drew Peterson	May 22, 2025	108A	0.35	0.0
7	"Found Dead in the Ozarks"	Murder of Rebekah Gould	May 29, 2025	109A	0.44	0.1
8	"Idaho College Murders"	2022 University of Idaho killings	June 5, 2025	110A	0.42	0.0
9	"Doomsday Mom Lori Vallow"	Vallow–Daybell murders	June 12, 2025	105A	0.31	0.0
10	"Murdaugh Murders"	Alex Murdaugh trial	June 19, 2025	106A	0.35	0.0
