= Hostage Rescue (TV series) =

American reality television series

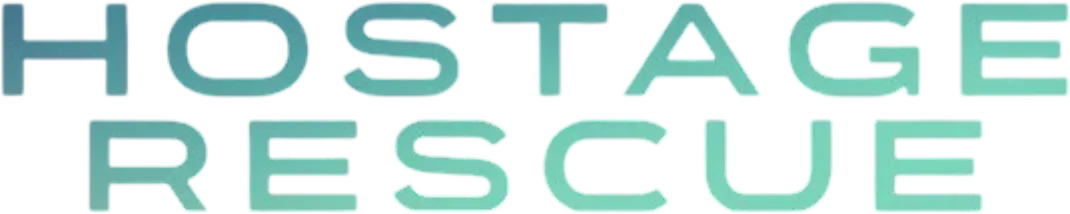
- Genre: Reality
- No. of seasons: 1
- No. of episodes: 6

Production
- Executive producers: Maria Awes; Andy Awes; Falguni Lakhani Adams
- Production companies: Committee Films; Vice Studios

Original release
- Network: The CW
- Release: May 14 – June 18, 2024

Hostage Rescue is an American docu-reality television series that aired on The CW from May 14 to June 18, 2024.

== Episodes ==
No.	Title	Original release date	Prod. code	U.S. viewers (millions)	Rating/share (18-49)
1	"Danger at the Door"	May 14, 2024	104	0.29	0.1/1
2	"Saved by the SEALs"	May 21, 2024	102	0.33	0.1/1
3	"Held Hostage at Discovery"	May 28, 2024	105	0.28	0.0/0
4	"Kidnapped in Monterrey"	June 4, 2024	101	0.37	0.1/1
5	"A Robbery Gone Wrong"	June 11, 2024	106	0.30	0.0/0
6	"Kidnapped in Iraq"	June 18, 2024	103	0.33	0.0/1
