= Patti Stanger: The Matchmaker =

American reality television series

- Presented by: Patti Stanger; Nick Viall
- No. of seasons: 1
- No. of episodes: 10

Production
- Executive producers: Eli Holzman; Aaron Saidman; Patti Stanger; Rob Lee; Thomas Kelly
- Production companies: The Intellectual Property Corporation; Mainstay Entertainment; Patti Stanger Productions

Original release
- Network: The CW
- Release: April 11 – June 13, 2024

Patti Stanger: The Matchmaker is an American reality television series which premiered on April 11, 2024, on The CW.

== Production ==
On May 18, 2023, it was announced that The CW had ordered the series under the title Patti Stanger: Millionaire Matchmaking. On February 15, 2024, the series was renamed Patti Stanger: The Matchmaker and it was also announced that the series would premiere on April 11, 2024.

== Episodes ==
No.	Title	Original release date	Prod. code	U.S. viewers (millions)	Rating/share (18-49)
1	"Ready for Love"	April 11, 2024	104	0.30	0.0/0
2	"Confidence Is Key"	April 18, 2024	101	0.39	0.1/1
3	"Love Isn't Perfect"	April 25, 2024	102	0.34	0.1/1
4	"New Beginnings"	May 2, 2024	106	0.32	0.0/0
5	"Commitment Issues"	May 9, 2024	105	0.25	0.1/1
6	"Lead with Your Heart"	May 16, 2024	107	0.24	0.0/0
7	"You Can't Always Get What You Want"	May 23, 2024	103	0.30	0.0/0
8	"Don't Always Take the Lead"	May 30, 2024	108	0.35	0.0/1
9	"Respect Yourself"	June 6, 2024	109	0.39	0.1/1
10	"It's Time for Me"	June 13, 2024	110	0.35	0.0/0
