= The Big Bakeover =

American reality television series

- Presented by: Nancy Birtwhistle
- No. of seasons: 1
- No. of episodes: 6

Production
- Executive producers: Rebecca Quinn; Jennifer O'Connell; Tim Warren
- Production company: Velvet Hammer Media

Original release
- Network: The CW
- Release: June 14 – July 19, 2024

The Big Bakeover is an American reality television series that premiered on June 14, 2024 on The CW.

== Production ==
On May 18, 2023, it was announced that The CW had ordered the series under the title The Great American Bakeover. On May 9, 2024, the series was renamed The Big Bakeover and it was also announced that the series would premiere on June 14, 2024.

In this new series, host Nancy Birtwhistle gave makeovers to several bakeries, including Sugarbox Donuts and Cali Al’s Cheesecakes. Birtwhistle had been the season 5 winner of Great British Bake-off.

As of April 2025, the series has neither been cancelled nor renewed for another season.

== Episodes ==
No.	Title	Original release date	Prod. code	U.S. viewers (millions)	Rating/share (18-49)
1	"Sugarbox Donuts"	June 14, 2024	105	0.30	0.0/0
2	"Mary Lane Cafe"	June 21, 2024	102	0.36	0.0/1
3	"Sugar Dayne Cookies"	June 28, 2024	101	0.29	0.0/1
4	"San Dimas Cake Company"	July 5, 2024	104	0.35	0.0/0
5	"Cali Al's Cheesecakes"	July 12, 2024	106	0.32	0.1/1
6	"Beverly's Bakery"	July 19, 2024	103	0.29	0.0/1
