= Police 24/7 (TV series) =

American police reality television series

- Genre: Reality
- No. of seasons: 2
- No. of episodes: 60

Production
- Executive producers: SallyAnn Salsano; Stijn Bakkers; Don Sikorski; Russell Muth; Frank Miccolis; Dave Hamilton; Josh Lansky
- Running time: 39 minutes

Original release
- Network: The CW
- Release: May 7, 2024 – present

Police 24/7 is an American police docu-reality television series which premiered on May 7, 2024, on The CW.

The second season premiered on January 23, 2025. The third season will premiere on March 10, 2027.

== Episodes ==
=== Series overview ===
| Season | Episodes | | Originally released | |
| Season | Episodes | | First released | Last released |
|---|---|---|---|---|
| 1 | 10 | | May 7, 2024 | June 25, 2024 |
| 2 | 50 | 23 | January 23, 2025 | June 26, 2025 |
| 2 | 50 | 27 | September 18, 2025 | May 27, 2026 |
| 3 | TBD | | March 10, 2027 | TBA |

=== Season 1 (2024) ===
| No. overall | No. in season | Title | Original release date | Prod. code | U.S. viewers (millions) | Rating/share (18-49) |
|---|---|---|---|---|---|---|
| 1 | 1 | "The Chase (Note: These episodes aired together under the title "Police 24/7". The Prod Code was #100.)" | May 7, 2024 | 102 | 0.47 | 0.1/1 |
| 2 | 2 | "Three Stops You're Out" | May 7, 2024 | 101 | 0.47 | 0.1/1 |
| 3 | 3 | "Close Shave" | May 14, 2024 | 104 | 0.41 | 0.1/1 |
| 4 | 4 | "Patients and Patience" | May 21, 2024 | 105 | 0.51 | 0.1/1 |
| 5 | 5 | "Into the Woods" | May 28, 2024 | 103 | 0.44 | 0.1/1 |
| 6 | 6 | "On the Run" | June 4, 2024 | 106 | 0.45 | 0.1/1 |
| 7 | 7 | "Outrunning the law" | June 11, 2024 | 107 | 0.49 | 0.1/1 |
| 8 | 8 | "You Again" | June 18, 2024 | 108 | 0.57 | 0.1/1 |
| 9 | 9 | "Tape It Off (Note: These episodes aired together under the title "Season Finale". The Prod Code was #111.)" | June 25, 2024 | 109 | 0.57 | 0.1/1 |
| 10 | 10 | "Man's Best Friend" | June 25, 2024 | 110 | 0.57 | 0.1/1 |

=== Season 2 (2025) ===
| No. overall | No. in season | Title | Original release date | Prod. code | U.S. viewers (millions) | Rating/share (18-49) |
|---|---|---|---|---|---|---|
Part 1
| 11 | 1 | "Foiled Again" | January 23, 2025 | 205 | 0.56 | 0.1/1 |
| 12 | 2 | "Credit Cards with Charges" | January 30, 2025 | 204 | 0.46 | 0.1/1 |
| 13 | 3 | "Swift Justice" | February 6, 2025 | 202 | 0.48 | 0.1/1 |
| 14 | 4 | "Locked and Loaded" | February 13, 2025 | 201 | 0.53 | 0.1/1 |
| 15 | 5 | "Bad Day at the Park" | February 20, 2025 | 203 | 0.42 | 0.0/1 |
| 16 | 6 | "Run n' Gun" | February 27, 2025 | 206 | 0.45 | 0.1/1 |
| 17 | 7 | "Family Matters" | March 6, 2025 | 207 | 0.42 | 0.0/1 |
| 18 | 8 | "Frisky Business" | March 13, 2025 | 208 | 0.39 | 0.1/1 |
| 19 | 9 | "Crime After Crime" | March 20, 2025 | 209 | 0.45 | 0.1/1 |
| 20 | 10 | "Naked Aggression" | March 27, 2025 | 210 | 0.51 | 0.0/1 |
| 21 | 11 | "Jaws of Life" | April 3, 2025 | 211 | 0.41 | 0.0/0 |
| 22 | 12 | "Side Swiped" | April 10, 2025 | 212 | 0.41 | 0.1/1 |
| 23 | 13 | "Small But Mighty" | April 17, 2025 | 213 | 0.47 | 0.1/1 |
| 24 | 14 | "Too Much Whine" | April 24, 2025 | 214 | 0.48 | 0.1/1 |
| 25 | 15 | "Food Fight" | May 1, 2025 | 215 | 0.47 | 0.1/1 |
| 26 | 16 | "You're in a Pickle" | May 8, 2025 | 216 | 0.45 | 0.1/1 |
| 27 | 17 | "Keep Testing Me, Man" | May 15, 2025 | 217 | 0.45 | 0.1/1 |
| 28 | 18 | "It's Not a Good Day Today" | May 22, 2025 | 218 | 0.48 | 0.0/1 |
| 29 | 19 | "She's in the Washing Machine" | May 29, 2025 | 219 | 0.52 | 0.1/1 |
| 30 | 20 | "On the Edge" | June 5, 2025 | 220 | 0.58 | 0.1/1 |
| 31 | 21 | "Do You Want to Pick Up a Felony?" | June 12, 2025 | 221 | 0.52 | 0.1/1 |
| 32 | 22 | "I Got One Running" | June 19, 2025 | 222 | 0.55 | 0.1/1 |
| 33 | 23 | "Keep Your Eyes Open" | June 26, 2025 | 223 | 0.52 | 0.1/1 |
Part 2
| 34 | 24 | "I'm Sorry, Grandma" | September 18, 2025 | 224 | 0.42 | 0.1/1 |
| 35 | 25 | "Get Down!" | September 18, 2025 | 225 | 0.49 | 0.1/1 |
| 36 | 26 | "What in the World is This?" | September 25, 2025 | 226 | 0.46 | 0.0/0 |
| 37 | 27 | "Rocky Relationship" | September 25, 2025 | 227 | 0.45 | 0.0/0 |
| 38 | 28 | "I Don't Think It's Crazy" | October 2, 2025 | 228 | 0.42 | 0.0/0 |
| 39 | 29 | "Where Y'all Headed?" | October 9, 2025 | 229 | 0.44 | 0.0/0 |
| 40 | 30 | "That's My Wife" | October 16, 2025 | 230 | 0.46 | 0.0/0 |
| 41 | 31 | "We're Not Doing That!" | October 23, 2025 | 231 | 0.43 | 0.0/0 |
| 42 | 32 | "Too Many Coincidences For Me" | October 30, 2025 | 232 | 0.42 | 0.0/0 |
| 43 | 33 | "Nice Try" | November 6, 2025 | 233 | 0.55 | 0.1/1 |
| 44 | 34 | "I'm Not Asking You" | November 13, 2025 | 234 | 0.46 | 0.0/0 |
| 45 | 35 | "Don't Do Nothing Dumb" | November 20, 2025 | 235 | 0.42 | 0.0/1 |
| 46 | 36 | "She's Breathing" | January 21, 2026 | 236 | N/A | TBA |
| 47 | 37 | "Let Me See Your Hands" | January 28, 2026 | 237 | N/A | TBA |
| 48 | 38 | "I Didn't Do Nothing" | February 4, 2026 | 238 | N/A | TBA |
| 49 | 39 | "Hands Behind Your Back" | February 25, 2026 | 239 | N/A | TBA |
| 50 | 40 | "Sorry" | March 4, 2026 | 240 | N/A | TBA |
| 51 | 41 | "I Know My Rights" | March 11, 2026 | 241 | N/A | TBA |
| 52 | 42 | "Is Today a Full Moon?" | March 18, 2026 | 242 | N/A | TBA |
| 53 | 43 | "Hot Pursuit" | March 25, 2026 | 243 | N/A | TBA |
| 54 | 44 | "Partners on Crime" | April 15, 2026 | 244 | N/A | TBA |
| 55 | 45 | "It's a Zoo Out There" | April 22, 2026 | 245 | N/A | TBA |
| 56 | 46 | "Search and Seizure" | April 29, 2026 | 246 | N/A | TBA |
| 57 | 47 | "Armed and Dangerous" | May 6, 2026 | 247 | N/A | TBA |
| 58 | 48 | "Busted" | May 13, 2026 | 248 | N/A | TBA |
| 59 | 49 | "Grand Theft Auto" | May 20, 2026 | 249 | N/A | TBA |
| 60 | 50 | "Hot Calls" | May 27, 2026 | 250 | N/A | TBA |
