= 2024–25 United States network television schedule =

Television schedule for the fall of 2024

The 2024–25 network television schedule for the five major English-language commercial broadcast networks that air in the United States covers the prime time hours from September 2024 to August 2025. The schedule is followed by a list per network of returning series, new series, and series canceled after the 2023–24 television season.

CBS was the first to announce its initial fall schedule on May 2, 2024 via press release (without an upfront presentation), followed by NBC on May 10 (with its upfront presentation at 10:30 a.m. Eastern Time on May 13), Fox on May 13 (with its upfront presentation at 4 p.m. that day), ABC on May 14 (with its upfront presentation at 4 p.m. that day), and The CW on May 16 (without an upfront presentation).

The 2024–25 season marked the final time where The CW announced its fall schedule. Beginning next season, The CW skipped its fall schedule from 2025 onwards.

PBS is not included, as member television stations have local flexibility over most of their schedule and broadcast times for network shows may vary. MyNetworkTV is also not included since its schedule features syndicated reruns.

Each of the 30 highest-rated shows released in May 2025 is listed with their ranks and ratings as determined by Nielsen Media Research.

New series to broadcast television are highlighted in bold. Repeat airings or same-day rebroadcasts are indicated by (R).

All times are U.S. Eastern and Pacific Time (except for some live sports or events). Subtract one hour for Central, Mountain, Alaska, and Hawaii–Aleutian times.

All sporting events air live in all time zones in U.S. Eastern time, with local and/or late night programming scheduled by affiliates after game completion.

During the NFL preseason and MLB regular season, some affiliates may not air their respective primetime programming due to their local NFL and/or MLB team games and may choose to put its network's programming on a sister channel to air live, delay the program to air later on the network or preempt the shows entirely.

== Legend ==
- Light blue indicates local programming.
- Gray indicates encore programming.
- Blue-gray indicates news programming.
- Light green indicates sporting events.
- Red indicates series being burned off and other irregularly scheduled programs, including specials and movies.
- Light gold indicates programming produced outside of the United States.
- Bronze indicates reruns of programming that originally aired on a cable channel or streaming service.
- highlight Yellow highlights indicates the top-10 most watched programs of the season.
- highlight Cyan highlights indicates numbers 11-20 most watched programs of the season.
- highlight Magenta highlights indicates numbers 21-30 most watched programs of the season.
- highlight Highlights indicates that it falls in multiple of the above categories.

== Sunday ==
Network		7:00 p.m.	7:30 p.m.	8:00 p.m.	8:30 p.m.	9:00 p.m.	9:30 p.m.	10:00 p.m.	10:30 p.m.
ABC	Fall	America's Funniest Home Videos		The Wonderful World of Disney (Note: On select weeks when repeats of America's Funniest Home Videos air at 8 p.m., The Wonderful World of Disney will air at 8:30 or 9 p.m.) (Note: On select weeks, The Wonderful World of Disney airs 3 hours of movies at 8 p.m., thus no other programming will air in the 10 p.m. hour (a half hour of programming will air if the movie is 2.5 hours long).)				Various programming	
ABC	Winter	America's Funniest Home Videos		American Idol				The $100,000 Pyramid	
ABC	Spring	America's Funniest Home Videos (R)				The Wonderful World of Disney			
ABC	Summer	America's Funniest Home Videos (R)			The Wonderful World of Disney				
CBS	Fall	NFL on CBS (4:25 p.m.)	60 Minutes (23/8.7) (Tied with Law & Order: Special Victims Unit)			Tracker (2/17.4)		The Equalizer (28/8.2) (Tied with FBI: International)	
CBS	Winter	60 Minutes (23/8.7) (Tied with Law & Order: Special Victims Unit)		Tracker (2/17.4)		**Watson** (11/11.0)		The Equalizer (28/8.2) (Tied with FBI: International)	
CBS	Spring	60 Minutes (R)				Tracker (R)		**Watson** (R)	
CBS	Summer	60 Minutes (R)		Big Brother		Tracker (R)		**Watson** (R)	
CBS	Mid-summer	60 Minutes (R)		Big Brother		Tracker (R)			
The CW	Fall	Penn & Teller: Fool Us (R)		The Chosen (R) (Note: On select weeks when The Chosen airs regular 60-minute episodes at 8 p.m., an additional episode of The Conners will air at 9 p.m. on top of its regular 9:30 p.m. airing.) (Note: On select weeks, The Chosen airs 120-minute episodes at 8 p.m., thus no other programming will air in the 9 p.m. hour.)			The Conners (R) (Note: If The CW Sunday Night Movie is only 2 hours long, an additional episode of The Conners will air at 9 p.m. on top of its original 9:30 p.m. airing.)	Local programming	
The CW	Mid-fall	The CW Sunday Night Movie (Note: On select weeks, The CW Sunday Night Movie airs 3 hours of movies at 7 p.m., thus no other programming will air in the 7 or 9 p.m. hours.)					The Conners (R)	Local programming	
The CW	Winter	Whose Line Is It Anyway? (R) (Note: On select weeks when repeats of Whose Line Is It Anyway? air at 7:30 p.m., The CW Sunday Night Movie will air at 8 p.m.)	The CW Sunday Night Movie					Local programming	
Fox	Fall	Fox NFL (4:25 p.m.)	The OT	The Simpsons	**Universal Basic Guys**	Bob's Burgers	Krapopolis	Local programming	
Fox	Winter	**Extracted** (R)		Family Guy	Grimsburg	The Great North	Krapopolis	Local programming	
Fox	Spring	**Extracted** (R)		The Simpsons	Family Guy	Krapopolis	The Great North	Local programming	
Fox	Mid-spring	Next Level Chef (R)		The Simpsons	Family Guy	Krapopolis	The Great North	Local programming	
Fox	Late spring	Fox Sports programming				**The Snake** (R)		Local programming	
Fox	Summer	The Quiz with Balls (R)		MasterChef (R)		**Gordon Ramsay's Secret Service** (R)		Local programming	
NBC	Fall	Football Night in America		NBC Sunday Night Football (8:20 p.m.) (1/21.6)					
NBC	Winter	Deal or No Deal Island (R)		Various programming		Dateline Weekend Mystery (R)			
NBC	Late winter	**The Americas** (R)		**The Americas**		**Suits LA**		**Grosse Pointe Garden Society**	
NBC	Spring	**The Americas** (R)		**The Americas**		**Suits LA**		Dateline NBC	
NBC	Late spring	American Ninja Warrior (R)				America's Got Talent (R)			

== Monday ==
Network		8:00 p.m.	8:30 p.m.	9:00 p.m.	9:30 p.m.	10:00 p.m.	10:30 p.m.
ABC	Fall	Monday Night Countdown	Monday Night Football (8:15 p.m.) (7/11.9)				
ABC	Winter	The Bachelor				**The Secret Lives of Mormon Wives** (R)	
ABC	Spring	American Idol				**Paradise** (R)	
ABC	Summer	Bachelor in Paradise				Match Game (R)	
CBS	Fall	The Price Is Right at Night		NCIS (R)			
CBS	Mid-fall	The Neighborhood	**Poppa's House**	NCIS (14/10.6) (Tied with FBI)		**NCIS: Origins** (21/9.3)	
CBS	Spring	The Neighborhood (R)		FBI (R)		FBI: Most Wanted (R)	
CBS	Summer	The Neighborhood (R)		FBI (R)		**Watson** (R)	
The CW	Fall	Superman & Lois		**The Wranglers**		Local programming	
The CW	Mid-fall	Superman & Lois		The Conners (R)		Local programming	
The CW	Late fall	Police 24/7 (R)				Local programming	
The CW	Winter	All American		**Trivial Pursuit** (R)	**Scrabble** (R)	Local programming	
The CW	Late winter	All American		**Trivial Pursuit** (R)		Local programming	
The CW	Spring	Wild Cards (R)		Sherlock & Daughter (R)		Local programming	
The CW	Summer	Penn & Teller: Fool Us (R)		Whose Line Is It Anyway? (R)		Local programming	
The CW	Late summer	Penn & Teller: Fool Us (R)		Masters of Illusion (R)		Local programming	
Fox	Fall	9-1-1: Lone Star		**Rescue: HI-Surf**		Local programming	
Fox	Winter	**Extracted**		**Rescue: HI-Surf**		Local programming	
Fox	Spring	**America's Most Wanted: Missing Persons**		America's Most Wanted		Local programming	
Fox	Late spring	Lego Masters		The Quiz with Balls		Local programming	
Fox	Summer	**Lego Masters Jr.**		The Quiz with Balls		Local programming	
NBC	Fall	The Voice (26/8.3) (Tied with Survivor 48)				**Brilliant Minds**	
NBC	Winter	The Voice (26/8.3) (Tied with Survivor 48)				**The Hunting Party**	
NBC	Spring	The Voice (26/8.3) (Tied with Survivor 48)				**Yes, Chef!**	
NBC	Late spring	American Ninja Warrior				**Yes, Chef!**	
NBC	Summer	American Ninja Warrior				**Survival Mode**	

== Tuesday ==
Network		8:00 p.m.	8:30 p.m.	9:00 p.m.	9:30 p.m.	10:00 p.m.	10:30 p.m.
ABC	Fall	Dancing with the Stars				**High Potential** (3/16.1)	
ABC	Winter	Will Trent (9/11.4)		**High Potential** (3/16.1)		The Rookie (13/10.8)	
ABC	Late winter	Will Trent (9/11.4)		The Rookie (13/10.8)		**High Potential** (R)	
ABC	Spring	Will Trent (9/11.4)		The Rookie (13/10.8)		Bad Romance: A Special Edition of 20/20	
ABC	Mid-spring	Celebrity Wheel of Fortune		Jeopardy! Masters		The Game Show Show (R)	
ABC	Late spring	Celebrity Wheel of Fortune (R)					
ABC	Summer	**High Potential** (R)		Will Trent (R)			
CBS	Fall	FBI (14/10.6) (Tied with NCIS)		FBI: International (28/8.2) (Tied with The Equalizer)		FBI: Most Wanted (25/8.4)	
CBS	Spring	NCIS (R)		**NCIS: Origins** (R)		NCIS: Sydney (R)	
CBS	Summer	NCIS (R)				**NCIS: Origins** (R)	
The CW		WWE NXT				Local programming	
Fox	Fall	**Murder in a Small Town**		Accused		Local programming	
Fox	Winter	Kitchen Nightmares		**Doc**		Local programming	
Fox	Spring	The Cleaning Lady		Alert: Missing Persons Unit		Local programming	
Fox	Late spring	The 1% Club		**The Snake**		Local programming	
NBC	Fall	The Voice				The Irrational	
NBC	Mid-fall	**St. Denis Medical**	Night Court	The Voice		The Irrational	
NBC	Winter	**St. Denis Medical**	Night Court	Deal or No Deal Island		The Irrational	
NBC	Spring	**St. Denis Medical**	Night Court	The Voice (R)			
NBC	Mid-spring	**St. Denis Medical**	Night Court	The Voice (R)		Various programming	
NBC	Late spring	America's Got Talent				**Destination X**	
NBC	Summer	America's Got Talent				**Songs & Stories with Kelly Clarkson**	

== Wednesday ==
Network		8:00 p.m.	8:30 p.m.	9:00 p.m.	9:30 p.m.	10:00 p.m.	10:30 p.m.
ABC	Fall	**The Golden Bachelorette**			Abbott Elementary (22/8.8)	What Would You Do?	
ABC	Winter	**Shifting Gears** (12/10.9)	Abbott Elementary (22/8.8)	Celebrity Jeopardy!		What Would You Do?	
ABC	Spring	The Conners	Abbott Elementary (22/8.8)	Celebrity Jeopardy!		What Would You Do?	
ABC	Late spring	Celebrity Wheel of Fortune		Jeopardy! Masters		Celebrity Jeopardy! (R)	
ABC	Summer	Who Wants to Be a Millionaire		Match Game		Shark Tank (R)	
CBS	Fall	Survivor 47 (30/7.9)			**The Summit**		
CBS	Winter	The Price Is Right at Night		Raid the Cage		Elsbeth (R)	
CBS	Mid-winter	Hollywood Squares		The Price Is Right at Night		Raid the Cage	
CBS	Late winter	Survivor 48 (26/8.3) (Tied with The Voice)			The Amazing Race		
CBS	Spring	Hollywood Squares (R)		Raid the Cage		The Equalizer (R)	
CBS	Summer	Big Brother			Hollywood Squares (R)	Elsbeth (R)	
The CW	Fall	Sullivan's Crossing		Inside the NFL		Local programming	
The CW	Late fall	Penn & Teller: Fool Us (R)		Inside the NFL		Local programming	
The CW	Winter	Wild Cards		**Good Cop/Bad Cop**		Local programming	
The CW	Spring	Wild Cards		**Sherlock & Daughter**		Local programming	
The CW	Mid-spring	Sullivan's Crossing		**Sherlock & Daughter**		Local programming	
The CW	Late spring	Sullivan's Crossing		Children Ruin Everything		Local programming	
The CW	Summer	Family Law		**Trivial Pursuit** (R)		Local programming	
The CW	Late summer	Family Law		**Good Cop/Bad Cop** (R)		Local programming	
Fox	Fall	The Masked Singer		The Floor		Local programming	
Fox	Winter	Special Forces: World's Toughest Test				Local programming	
Fox	Mid-winter	The Masked Singer		The Floor		Local programming	
Fox	Spring	MasterChef		**Gordon Ramsay's Secret Service**		Local programming	
NBC	Fall	Chicago Med (19/9.7)		Chicago Fire (16/10.3)		Chicago P.D. (18/9.8)	
NBC	Summer	America's Got Talent		Chicago Fire (16/10.3)		Chicago P.D. (18/9.8)	

== Thursday ==
Network		8:00 p.m.	8:30 p.m.	9:00 p.m.	9:30 p.m.	10:00 p.m.	10:30 p.m.
ABC	Fall	9-1-1 (10/11.1)		**Doctor Odyssey**		Grey's Anatomy	
ABC	Late fall	The Great Christmas Light Fight				Various programming	
ABC	Winter	Extreme Makeover: Home Edition		Only Murders in the Building (R)			
ABC	Mid-winter	Extreme Makeover: Home Edition		**Scamanda**		**Perfect Wife: The Mysterious Disappearance of Sherri Papini** (R)	
ABC	Late winter	9-1-1 (10/11.1)		**Doctor Odyssey**		Grey's Anatomy	
ABC	Spring	9-1-1 (R)					
ABC	Summer	Celebrity Family Feud		Press Your Luck		Press Your Luck (R)	
ABC	Late summer	Celebrity Family Feud		Celebrity Family Feud (R)		Various programming	
CBS	Fall	**Georgie & Mandy's First Marriage** (5/12.1) (Tied with Ghosts)	Ghosts (5/12.1) (Tied with Georgie & Mandy's First Marriage)	**Matlock** (4/16.0)		Elsbeth (8/11.5)	
CBS	Winter	Hollywood Squares		**Georgie & Mandy's First Marriage** (R)	Ghosts (R)	**Matlock** (R)	
CBS	Mid-winter	**Georgie & Mandy's First Marriage** (5/12.1) (Tied with Ghosts)	Ghosts (5/12.1) (Tied with Georgie & Mandy's First Marriage)	**Matlock** (4/16.0)		Elsbeth (8/11.5)	
CBS	Spring	**Georgie & Mandy's First Marriage** (5/12.1) (Tied with Ghosts)	Ghosts (5/12.1) (Tied with Georgie & Mandy's First Marriage)	Elsbeth (8/11.5)		Elsbeth (R)	
CBS	Late spring	**Georgie & Mandy's First Marriage** (5/12.1) (Tied with Ghosts)	Ghosts (5/12.1) (Tied with Georgie & Mandy's First Marriage)	**Matlock** (R)		Elsbeth (R)	
CBS	Summer	Big Brother		**Georgie & Mandy's First Marriage** (R)	Ghosts (R)	**Matlock** (R)	
The CW	Fall	Penn & Teller: Fool Us (R)		Totally Funny Animals	Totally Funny Kids	Local programming	
The CW	Mid-fall	**Scrabble**		**Trivial Pursuit**		Local programming	
The CW	Winter	Police 24/7		Crime Nation		Local programming	
The CW	Summer	Police 24/7 (R)				Local programming	
Fox	Fall	Hell's Kitchen		Crime Scene Kitchen		Local programming	
Fox	Winter	Hell's Kitchen		Animal Control	**Going Dutch**	Local programming	
Fox	Mid-winter	Next Level Chef		Animal Control	**Going Dutch**	Local programming	
Fox	Spring	Next Level Chef		Farmer Wants a Wife		Local programming	
Fox	Late spring	Bob's Burgers	Grimsburg	Family Guy	The Great North	Local programming	
Fox	Summer	Bob's Burgers	The Great North	The 1% Club (R)		Local programming	
Fox	Late summer	Baseball Night in America (7:00 p.m.)				Local programming	
NBC	Fall	Law & Order		Law & Order: Special Victims Unit (23/8.7) (Tied with 60 Minutes)		Found	
NBC	Spring	Transplant		Law & Order: Special Victims Unit (23/8.7) (Tied with 60 Minutes)		Law & Order (R)	
NBC	Summer	**The Hunting Party** (R)		Law & Order: Special Victims Unit (23/8.7) (Tied with 60 Minutes)		Law & Order (R)	
NBC	Late summer	**Songs & Stories with Kelly Clarkson** (R)		Law & Order: Special Victims Unit (23/8.7) (Tied with 60 Minutes)		Law & Order (R)	

== Friday ==
Network		8:00 p.m.	8:30 p.m.	9:00 p.m.	9:30 p.m.	10:00 p.m.	10:30 p.m.
ABC	Fall	Shark Tank		20/20			
ABC	Late fall	ESPN College Football on ABC					
ABC	Winter	Shark Tank		20/20			
ABC	Spring	Celebrity Jeopardy! (R)		20/20			
CBS	Fall	S.W.A.T.		Fire Country (20/9.6)		Blue Bloods (17/10.1)	
CBS	Winter	NCIS: Sydney		Fire Country (20/9.6)		S.W.A.T.	
CBS	Spring	Hollywood Squares		S.W.A.T.		Fire Country (R)	
CBS	Late spring	Fire Country (R)		Various programming			
CBS	Summer	**Big Brother: Unlocked**		Fire Country (R)		NCIS: Sydney (R)	
CBS	Late summer	**Big Brother: Unlocked**		Fire Country (R)		Blue Bloods (R)	
The CW	Fall	Whose Line Is It Anyway?		Inside the NFL		Local programming	
The CW	Mid-fall	Whose Line Is It Anyway?		**Joan**		Local programming	
The CW	Late fall	Bob Hearts Abishola (R)		Children Ruin Everything		Local programming	
The CW	Winter	Penn & Teller: Fool Us		Masters of Illusion		Local programming	
The CW	Spring	Penn & Teller: Fool Us		Mysteries Decoded (R)		Local programming	
The CW	Late spring	Penn & Teller: Fool Us		Masters of Illusion (R)		Local programming	
The CW	Summer	Penn & Teller: Fool Us		Totally Funny Animals	Totally Funny Kids	Local programming	
The CW	Late summer	Penn & Teller: Fool Us		Totally Funny Animals (R)		Local programming	
Fox	Fall	Fox College Football Friday					
Fox	Winter	Fox College Basketball Friday				Local programming	
Fox	Spring	Fox UFL Friday					
Fox	Late spring	MasterChef (R)		**Gordon Ramsay's Secret Service** (R)		Local programming	
Fox	Summer	**The Fixer**				Local programming	
NBC	Fall	**Happy's Place**	Lopez vs Lopez	Dateline NBC			
NBC	Spring	**Grosse Pointe Garden Society**		Dateline NBC			
NBC	Late spring	**Happy's Place** (R)		Dateline NBC			
NBC	Summer	America's Got Talent (R)				Dateline NBC	

== Saturday ==
Network		8:00 p.m.	8:30 p.m.	9:00 p.m.	9:30 p.m.	10:00 p.m.	10:30 p.m.
ABC	Fall	Saturday Night Football (7:30 p.m.)					
ABC	Winter	NBA Countdown	NBA Saturday Primetime				
ABC	Spring	ESPN on ABC sports programming					
CBS	Fall	Crimetime Saturday				48 Hours	
CBS	Spring	Crimetime Saturday		48 Hours (R)			
The CW	Fall	CW Sports programming				Local programming	
The CW	Winter	I Am (R)				Local programming	
The CW	Spring	CW Sports programming				Local programming	
The CW	Late spring	Penn & Teller: Fool Us (R)				Local programming	
The CW	Summer	CW Sports programming				Local programming	
Fox	Fall	Fox College Football (continued to game completion)					
Fox	Winter	Fox Primetime Hoops				Local programming	
Fox	Spring	Fox Sports programming				Local programming	
Fox	Mid-spring	Baseball Night in America (7:00 p.m.)				Local programming	
NBC	Fall	College Football on NBC (Note: Branded as Big Ten Saturday Night or Notre Dame Football on NBC depending on conference game being broadcast.) (7:30 p.m.)					
NBC	Late fall	Dateline Weekend Mystery (R)				Saturday Night Live (R)	
NBC	Spring	The Wall (R)		Dateline Weekend Mystery (R)		Saturday Night Live (R)	
NBC	Summer	The Wall (R)		Dateline Weekend Mystery (R)			

== By network ==
=== ABC ===
Returning series:

- The $100,000 Pyramid
- 20/20
- 9-1-1
- Abbott Elementary
- ABC Hockey Saturday
- American Idol
- America's Funniest Home Videos
- The Bachelor
- Bachelor in Paradise
- Bad Romance: A Special Edition of 20/20
- Celebrity Family Feud
- Celebrity Jeopardy!
- Celebrity Wheel of Fortune
- The Conners
- Dancing with the Stars
- Extreme Makeover: Home Edition (Note: Series revival; previously aired on ABC from 2004 to 2012 and on HGTV in 2020.)
- The Great Christmas Light Fight
- Grey's Anatomy
- Jeopardy! Masters
- Match Game (Note: Series revival; previously aired on ABC from 2016 to 2021.)
- Monday Night Countdown
- Monday Night Football
- NBA Countdown
- NBA Saturday Primetime
- Only Murders in the Building (Note: A Hulu original series; airs repeats.)
- Press Your Luck
- The Rookie
- Saturday Night Football
- Shark Tank
- UFL on ABC
- What Would You Do?
- Who Wants to Be a Millionaire
- Will Trent
- The Wonderful World of Disney

New series:

- **Doctor Odyssey**
- **The Golden Bachelorette**
- **High Potential**
- **Paradise**
- **Perfect Wife: The Mysterious Disappearance of Sherri Papini**
- **Scamanda**
- **The Secret Lives of Mormon Wives**
- **Shifting Gears**

Not returning from 2023–24:

- The Bachelorette (originally planned to return for 2025–26, later pulled off from the schedule)
- Claim to Fame
- The Golden Bachelor (returned for 2025–26)
- The Good Doctor
- The Interrogation Tapes: A Special Edition of 20/20
- Lucky 13
- NBA Wednesday
- Not Dead Yet
- Station 19

=== CBS ===
Returning series:

- 48 Hours
- 60 Minutes
- The Amazing Race
- Big Brother
- Blue Bloods (Note: The series' final season was split into two parts, with ten episodes airing in the 2023–24 season, and the remaining eight episodes airing this season.)
- Elsbeth
- The Equalizer
- FBI
- FBI: International
- FBI: Most Wanted
- Fire Country
- Ghosts
- Hollywood Squares (Note: Second primetime weekly version; previously aired on NBC from 1966 to 1980, before moving to first-run syndication for 9 additional seasons until 2004.)
- NCIS
- NCIS: Sydney
- The Neighborhood
- NFL on CBS
- Raid the Cage
- Survivor
- S.W.A.T.
- Tracker

New series:

- **Big Brother: Unlocked**
- **Georgie & Mandy's First Marriage**
- **Matlock**
- **NCIS: Origins**
- **Poppa's House**
- **The Summit**
- **Watson**

Not returning from 2023–24:

- Bob Hearts Abishola
- CSI: Vegas
- Lotería Loca
- NCIS: Hawaiʻi
- So Help Me Todd
- Young Sheldon

=== The CW ===
Returning series:

- All American
- Bob Hearts Abishola (reruns) (Note: A CBS original series; airs repeats.)
- Children Ruin Everything
- The Chosen
- The Conners (reruns) (Note: An ABC original series; airs repeats.)
- Crime Nation
- CW Football Saturday
- Family Law
- Inside the NFL
- Masters of Illusion
- Mysteries Decoded (reruns)
- Penn & Teller: Fool Us
- Police 24/7
- Son of a Critch
- Sullivan's Crossing
- Superman & Lois
- Totally Funny Animals
- Totally Funny Kids
- Whose Line Is It Anyway?
- Wild Cards
- WWE NXT (moved from USA Network)

New series:

- **AVP Saturday Nights**
- **Good Cop/Bad Cop**
- **Joan**
- **Scrabble**
- **Sherlock & Daughter**
- **Trivial Pursuit**
- **The Wranglers**

Not returning from 2023–24:

- 100 Days to Indy (moved to Fox Nation)
- All American: Homecoming
- Everyone Else Burns
- Ride
- Run the Burbs
- The Spencer Sisters
- Walker

=== Fox ===
Returning series:

- The 1% Club
- 9-1-1: Lone Star
- Accused
- Alert: Missing Persons Unit
- America's Most Wanted
- Animal Control
- Baseball Night in America
- Bob's Burgers
- The Cleaning Lady
- Crime Scene Kitchen
- Family Guy
- Farmer Wants a Wife
- The Floor
- Fox College Football
- Fox College Hoops
- The Great North
- Grimsburg
- Hell's Kitchen
- Kitchen Nightmares
- Krapopolis
- Lego Masters
- Lego Masters: Celebrity Holiday Bricktacular
- The Masked Singer
- MasterChef
- Next Level Chef
- NFL on Fox
- The OT
- The Quiz with Balls
- The Simpsons
- Special Forces: World's Toughest Test
- UFL on Fox

New series:

- **America's Most Wanted: Missing Persons**
- **Doc**
- **Extracted**
- **The Fixer**
- **Going Dutch**
- **Gordon Ramsay's Secret Service**
- **Lego Masters Jr.**
- **Murder in a Small Town**
- **The Real Full Monty**
- **Rescue: HI-Surf**
- **The Snake**
- **Universal Basic Guys**

Not returning from 2023–24:

- WWE SmackDown (moved to USA Network)

=== NBC ===
Returning series:

- American Ninja Warrior
- America's Got Talent
- Big Ten Saturday Night
- Chicago Fire
- Chicago Med
- Chicago P.D.
- Dateline NBC
- Deal or No Deal Island
- Football Night in America
- Found
- The Irrational
- Law & Order
- Law & Order: Special Victims Unit
- Lopez vs Lopez
- NBC Sunday Night Football
- Night Court
- Notre Dame Football on NBC
- Transplant
- The Voice

New series:

- **The Americas**
- **Brilliant Minds**
- **Destination X**
- **Grosse Pointe Garden Society**
- **Happy's Place**
- **The Hunting Party**
- **St. Denis Medical**
- **Songs & Stories with Kelly Clarkson**
- **Suits LA**
- **Survival Mode**
- **Yes, Chef!**

Not returning from 2023–24:

- Extended Family
- La Brea
- Law & Order: Organized Crime (moved to Peacock)
- Magnum P.I.
- Quantum Leap
- Weakest Link (moved to Fox in 2025–26)

== Renewals and cancellations ==
=== Full season pickups ===
==== CBS ====
- Georgie & Mandy's First Marriage—Picked up for a 22-episode full season on October 30, 2024.
- Matlock—Picked up for an 18-episode full season on September 8, 2024.
- NCIS: Origins—Picked up for an 18-episode full season on November 7, 2024.
- Poppa's House—Picked up for an 18-episode full season on November 7, 2024.

==== Fox ====
- Rescue: HI-Surf—Picked up for a 19-episode full season on April 12, 2024.

==== NBC ====
- Found—Picked up for a 22-episode full season on January 17, 2024.
- Happy's Place—Pickup for an 18-episode full season on November 21, 2024.
- Night Court—Picked up for an 18-episode full season on March 31, 2025.
- St. Denis Medical—Picked up for an 18-episode full season on June 14, 2024.

=== Renewals ===
==== ABC ====
- 20/20—Renewed for a forty-eighth season on May 13, 2025.
- 9-1-1—Renewed for a ninth season on April 3, 2025.
- Abbott Elementary—Renewed for a fifth season on January 21, 2025.
- ABC Hockey Saturday—Renewed for a twelfth season on March 10, 2021; deal will last into a fourteenth season in 2027.
- American Idol—Renewed for a twenty-fourth season on May 9, 2025.
- America's Funniest Home Videos—Renewed for a thirty-sixth season on May 9, 2025.
- The Bachelor—Renewed for a thirtieth season on June 30, 2025.
- Bachelor in Paradise–Renewed for an eleventh season on April 22, 2026.
- Celebrity Family Feud–Renewed for a thirteenth season on May 8, 2026.
- Celebrity Jeopardy!—Renewed for a fourth season on May 9, 2025.
- Celebrity Wheel of Fortune—Renewed for a sixth season on May 9, 2025.
- Dancing with the Stars—Renewed for a thirty-fourth season on April 22, 2025.
- The Great Christmas Light Fight—Renewed for a thirteenth season on November 1, 2024.
- Grey's Anatomy—Renewed for a twenty-second season on April 3, 2025.
- High Potential—Renewed for a second season on January 21, 2025.
- Monday Night Football—Renewed for a sixth season on March 18, 2021; deal will go to a thirteenth season in 2033.
- The Rookie—Renewed for an eighth season on April 3, 2025.
- Shark Tank—Renewed for a seventeenth season on May 9, 2025.
- Shifting Gears—Renewed for a second season on April 3, 2025.
- What Would You Do?–Renewed for an eighteenth season on November 6, 2026.
- Who Wants to Be a Millionaire–Renewed for a twenty-fifth season on May 8, 2026.
- Will Trent—Renewed for a fourth season on April 3, 2025.

==== CBS ====
- 48 Hours—Renewed for a thirty-seventh season on May 7, 2025.
- 60 Minutes—Renewed for a fifty-eighth season on May 7, 2025.
- The Amazing Race—Renewed for a thirty-eighth season on February 20, 2025.
- Big Brother—Renewed for a twenty-eighth season on May 13, 2026.
- Elsbeth—Renewed for a third season on February 20, 2025.
- FBI—Renewed for an eighth and ninth season on April 9, 2024.
- Fire Country—Renewed for a fourth season on February 20, 2025.
- Georgie & Mandy's First Marriage—Renewed for a second season on February 20, 2025.
- Ghosts—Renewed for a fifth and sixth season on February 20, 2025.
- Hollywood Squares—Renewed for a second season on February 20, 2025.
- Matlock—Renewed for a second season on October 22, 2024.
- NCIS—Renewed for a twenty-third season on February 20, 2025.
- NCIS: Origins—Renewed for a second season on February 20, 2025.
- NCIS: Sydney—Renewed for a third season on February 20, 2025.
- Survivor—Renewed for a forty-ninth and fiftieth season on February 20, 2025.
- The Neighborhood—Renewed for an eighth and final season on March 10, 2025.
- Tracker—Renewed for a third season on February 20, 2025.
- Watson—Renewed for a second season on March 26, 2025.

==== The CW ====
- All American—Renewed for an eighth and final season on June 2, 2025.
- Scrabble—Renewed for a second season on May 19, 2025.
- Sullivan's Crossing—Renewed for a fourth season on July 16, 2025.
- Totally Funny Animals—Renewed for a second season on April 22, 2025.
- Trivial Pursuit—Renewed for a second season on May 19, 2025.
- Wild Cards—Renewed for a third season on November 19, 2025.

==== Fox ====
- Animal Control—Renewed for a fourth season on May 7, 2025.
- Bob's Burgers—Renewed for a sixteenth, seventeenth, eighteenth and nineteenth season on April 2, 2025.
- Doc—Renewed for a second season on February 26, 2025.
- Extracted—Renewed for a second season on May 10, 2025.
- Family Guy—Renewed for a twenty-fourth, twenty-fifth, twenty-sixth and twenty-seventh season on April 2, 2025.
- The Floor—Renewed for a fourth and fifth season on May 10, 2025.
- Going Dutch—Renewed for a second season on May 7, 2025.
- Grimsburg—Renewed for a third season on May 10, 2025.
- Hell's Kitchen—Renewed for a twenty-fourth season on March 26, 2024.
- Krapopolis—Renewed for a third season on March 1, 2023, a fourth season on July 25, 2024, and a fifth season on May 10, 2025.
- Lego Masters—Renewed for a sixth season on June 13, 2025.
- The Masked Singer—Renewed for a fourteenth season on May 7, 2025.
- MasterChef—Renewed for a sixteenth and seventeenth season on October 9, 2025.
- Murder in a Small Town—Renewed for a second season on January 16, 2025.
- Next Level Chef—Renewed for a fifth and sixth season on February 27, 2025.
- The Simpsons—Renewed for a thirty-seventh, thirty-eighth, thirty-ninth and fortieth season on April 2, 2025.
- Special Forces: World's Toughest Test—Renewed for a fourth season on May 12, 2025.
- Universal Basic Guys—Renewed for a second season on May 13, 2024, and a third season on May 10, 2025.

==== NBC ====
- American Ninja Warrior—Renewed for an eighteenth season on August 4, 2025.
- America's Got Talent—Renewed for a twenty-first season on March 12, 2026.
- The Americas—Renewed for a second season on June 22, 2026, set to premiere in 2028.
- Big Ten Saturday Night—Renewed for a third season on August 18, 2022; deal will last into a seventh season in 2029.
- Brilliant Minds—Renewed for a second season on May 12, 2025.
- Chicago Fire—Renewed for a fourteenth season on May 5, 2025.
- Chicago Med—Renewed for an eleventh season on May 5, 2025.
- Chicago P.D.—Renewed for a thirteenth season on May 5, 2025.
- Dateline NBC—Renewed for a thirty-fourth season on May 12, 2025.
- Destination X—Renewed for a second season on March 3, 2026.
- Football Night in America—Renewed for a twentieth season on March 18, 2021; deal will go to a twenty-eighth season in 2033.
- Happy's Place—Renewed for a second season on February 20, 2025.
- The Hunting Party—Renewed for a second season on May 12, 2025.
- Law & Order—Renewed for a twenty-fifth season on May 8, 2025.
- Law & Order: Special Victims Unit—Renewed for a twenty-seventh season on May 8, 2025.
- NBA on NBC—It was announced on July 24, 2024, that NBC regained the rights to air NBA games for eleven years through the 2035–36 season.
- NBC Sunday Night Football—Renewed for a twentieth season on March 18, 2021; deal will go to a twenty-eighth season in 2033.
- St. Denis Medical—Renewed for a second season on January 14, 2025.
- The Voice—Renewed for a twenty-eighth season on May 12, 2025, and a twenty-ninth season on July 22, 2025.
- WNBA on NBC—In addition to its NBA deal, it was also announced on July 24, 2024 that NBC regained the rights to air WNBA games for eleven years through the 2036 season.

=== Cancellations/series endings ===
==== ABC ====
- The Conners—It was announced on May 2, 2024, that season seven would be the final season. The series concluded on April 23, 2025.
- Doctor Odyssey—Canceled on June 27, 2025.
- Scamanda—The limited series was meant to run for one season only; it concluded on February 20, 2025.

==== CBS ====
- Blue Bloods—It was announced on November 20, 2023, that season fourteen would be the final season. The series concluded on December 13, 2024.
- The Equalizer—Canceled on May 2, 2025, after five seasons. The series concluded on May 4, 2025.
- FBI: International—Canceled on March 4, 2025, after four seasons. The series concluded on May 20, 2025.
- FBI: Most Wanted—Canceled on March 4, 2025, after six seasons. The series concluded on May 20, 2025.
- Poppa's House—Canceled on April 22, 2025. The series concluded on April 28, 2025.
- The Summit—Canceled on April 22, 2025.
- S.W.A.T.—It was announced on March 6, 2025, that season eight would be the final season. The series concluded on May 16, 2025.

==== The CW ====
- Children Ruin Everything—It was announced on February 11, 2025 that season four would be the final season.
- Good Cop/Bad Cop—Canceled on February 13, 2026.
- Joan—The miniseries was meant to run for one season only; it concluded on November 8, 2024.
- Superman & Lois—It was announced on November 2, 2023 that season four would be the final season. The series concluded on December 2, 2024.
- The Wranglers—Canceled on October 30, 2024, marking the first cancellation of the season.

==== Fox ====
- 9-1-1: Lone Star—It was announced on September 5, 2024, that season five would be the final season. The series concluded on February 3, 2025.
- Alert: Missing Persons Unit—Canceled on June 6, 2025, after three seasons.
- The Cleaning Lady—Canceled on June 6, 2025, after four seasons.
- The Great North—Canceled on October 3, 2025, after five seasons.
- Rescue: HI-Surf—Canceled on May 7, 2025.
- The Snake—Cancelled on May 11, 2026.

==== NBC ====
- Deal or No Deal Island—Canceled on December 2, 2025 after two seasons.
- Found—Canceled on May 9, 2025, after two seasons. The series concluded on May 15, 2025.
- Grosse Pointe Garden Society—Canceled on June 27, 2025.
- The Irrational—Canceled on May 9, 2025, after two seasons.
- Lopez vs Lopez—Canceled on May 9, 2025, after three seasons.
- Night Court—Canceled on May 9, 2025, after three seasons.
- Suits LA—Canceled on May 9, 2025. The series concluded on May 18, 2025.
- Survival Mode—The limited series was meant to run for one season only; it concluded on September 1, 2025.
- Transplant—It was announced on September 13, 2023, that season four would be the final season. The series concluded on July 17, 2025.
- Yes, Chef!—Canceled on March 12, 2026.

== See also ==
- 2024–25 Canadian network television schedule
- 2024–25 United States network television schedule (morning)
- 2024–25 United States network television schedule (daytime)
- 2024–25 United States network television schedule (late night)
- 2024–25 United States network television schedule (overnight)
