= List of 2025 American television debuts =

These American television shows premiered in 2025.

== January ==
First aired	Title	Channel	Source
January 1	Missing You	Netflix	
January 2	Going Dutch	Fox	
January 3	Selling the City	Netflix	
January 3	They Call It Late Night	ESPN	
January 7	Doc	Fox	
January 8	Shifting Gears	ABC	
January 9	American Primeval	Netflix	
January 9	On Call	Amazon Prime Video	
January 9	The Pitt	Max	
January 11	StuGo	Disney Channel	
January 13	Baylen Out Loud	TLC	
January 15	Scam Goddess	Freeform	
January 16	SNL50: Beyond Saturday Night	Peacock	
January 17	RoboGobo	Disney Jr./Disney+	
January 19	The Hunting Party	NBC	
January 22	Prime Target	Apple TV+	
January 22	The Thundermans: Undercover	Nickelodeon	
January 22	W.A.G.s to Riches	Netflix	
January 23	The Family Business: New Orleans	BET+	
January 25	Kobe: The Making of a Legend	CNN	
January 26	Watson	CBS	
January 27	The Fall of Diddy	Investigation Discovery	
January 28	Great Migrations: A People on the Move	PBS	
January 28	Paradise	Hulu	
January 29	The Flip Off	HGTV	
January 29	Your Friendly Neighborhood Spider-Man	Disney+	
January 30	Scamanda	ABC	
January 30	Mermicorno: Starfall	Max	

== February ==
First aired	Title	Channel	Source
February 2	Common Side Effects	Adult Swim	
February 6	Clean Slate	Amazon Prime Video	
February 6	The Z-Suite	Tubi	
February 7	Love After Lockup: Crime Story	We TV	
February 10	Extracted	Fox	
February 11	Muslim Matchmaker	Hulu	
February 12	Harlem Ice	Disney+	
February 13	Sweethearts	Amazon Prime Video	
February 14	Goldie	Apple TV+	
February 16	WWE LFG	A&E	
February 16	WWE's Greatest Moments	A&E	
February 19	Win or Lose	Disney+	
February 19	Good Cop/Bad Cop	The CW	
February 20	Zero Day	Netflix	
February 23	The Americas	NBC	
February 23	Grosse Pointe Garden Society	NBC	
February 23	Suits LA	NBC	
February 23	The Baldwins	TLC	
February 24	Beyond the Gates	CBS	
February 27	Running Point	Netflix	
February 27	House of David	Amazon Prime Video	

== March ==
First aired	Title	Channel	Source
March 2	Nine Bodies in a Mexican Morgue	MGM+	
March 3	Skillsville	PBS Kids	
March 3	Celtics City	HBO	
March 3	The Situation Room with Wolf Blitzer and Pamela Brown	CNN	
March 4	Daredevil: Born Again	Disney+	
March 4	Denise Richards & Her Wild Things	E!	
March 4	Jay & Pamela	TLC	
March 4	With Love, Meghan	Netflix	
March 5	WWE Evolve	Tubi	
March 6	Deli Boys	Hulu	
March 6	Dylan's Playtime Adventures	Max	
March 9	Oh My God... Yes!	Adult Swim	
March 10	Confessions of Octomom	Lifetime	
March 13	Long Bright River	Peacock	
March 13	Adolescence	Netflix	
March 14	Dope Thief	Apple TV+	
March 19	Good American Family	Hulu	
March 20	The Residence	Netflix	
March 20	Happy Face	Paramount+	
March 21	Bearbrick	Apple TV+	
March 24	Hollywood Demons	Investigation Discovery	
March 26	Side Quest	Apple TV+	
March 26	The Studio	Apple TV+	
March 26	Million Dollar Secret	Netflix	
March 27	Paul American	Max	
March 28	Mid-Century Modern	Hulu	
March 30	MobLand	Paramount+	

== April ==
First aired	Title	Channel	Source
April 3	Devil May Cry	Netflix	
April 3	Pulse	Netflix	
April 3	The Bondsman	Amazon Prime Video	
April 4	Dying for Sex	FX on Hulu	
April 5	Iyanu	Cartoon Network/Max	
April 6	Lazarus	Adult Swim	
April 7	Blippi's Job Show	Netflix	
April 8	Spy High	Amazon Prime Video	
April 11	Your Friends and Neighbors	Apple TV+	
April 11	Got to Get Out	Hulu	
April 12	RoboForce: The Animated Series	Tubi	
April 16	Government Cheese	Apple TV+	
April 16	Sherlock & Daughter	The CW	
April 17	#1 Happy Family USA	Amazon Prime Video	
April 18	Parlor Room	Dropout	
April 21	Dr. Pimple Popper: Breaking Out	Lifetime	
April 24	Étoile	Amazon Prime Video	
April 27	Love Hotel	Bravo	
April 28	Yes, Chef!	NBC	
April 29	PolyFamily	TLC	
April 29	Castle Impossible	HGTV	
April 29	Wear Whatever the F You Want	Amazon Prime Video	
April 30	Asterix and Obelix: The Big Fight	Netflix	

== May ==
First aired	Title	Channel	Source
May 1	The Four Seasons	Netflix	
May 4	Star Wars: Tales of the Underworld	Disney+	
May 5	The Motherhood	Hallmark+	
May 8	Forever	Netflix	
May 9	Acoustic Rooster: Jazzy Jams	PBS Kids	
May 10	The Judd Family: Truth Be Told	Lifetime	
May 13	Bad Thoughts	Netflix	
May 15	Overcompensating	Amazon Prime Video	
May 15	Duster	Max	
May 16	Murderbot	Apple TV+	
May 18	Tucci in Italy	National Geographic	
May 20	Motorheads	Amazon Prime Video	
May 22	Sirens	Netflix	
May 22	She the People	Netflix	
May 25	The Librarians: The Next Chapter	TNT	
May 27	Destination X	NBC	
May 28	Adults	FX	
May 29	The Better Sister	Amazon Prime Video	

== June ==
First aired	Title	Channel	Source
June 3	Next Gen NYC	Bravo	
June 4	Stick	Apple TV+	
June 6	Wylde Pak	Nickelodeon	
June 9	Virgins	TLC	
June 10	Call Her Alex	Hulu	
June 10	The Gilgo Beach Killer: House of Secrets	Peacock	
June 12	Revival	Syfy	
June 13	Not a Box	Apple TV+	
June 18	We Were Liars	Amazon Prime Video	
June 19	The Waterfront	Netflix	
June 24	Ironheart	Disney+	
June 25	Countdown	Amazon Prime Video	
June 26	Nelly and Ashanti: We Belong Together	Peacock	
June 27	Smoke	Apple TV+	

== July ==
First aired	Title	Channel	Source
July 7	Survival Mode	NBC	
July 9	Ballard	Amazon Prime Video	
July 9	Building the Band	Netflix	
July 10	Too Much	Netflix	
July 10	Electric Bloom	Disney Channel	
July 10	Back to the Frontier	Magnolia Network/Max	
July 11	Dexter: Resurrection	Paramount+ with Showtime	
July 13	The Institute	MGM+	
July 13	Love Island: Beyond the Villa	Peacock	
July 17	Untamed	Netflix	
July 21	The Hunting Wives	Netflix	
July 22	Hip Hop Was Born Here	Paramount+	
July 23	Washington Black	Hulu	
July 24	Hitmakers	Netflix	
July 24	Epic Ride: The Story of Universal Theme Parks	Peacock	
July 25	Big Brother: Unlocked	CBS	
July 25	Solo Traveling with Tracee Ellis Ross	The Roku Channel	
July 29	WWE Unreal	Netflix	
July 29	Adaptive	Peacock	
July 31	Leanne	Netflix	

== August ==
First aired	Title	Channel	Source
August 1	Chief of War	Apple TV+	
August 1	Eyes of Wakanda	Disney+	
August 2	Heart & Hustle: Houston	Oprah Winfrey Network	
August 3	The Yogurt Shop Murders	HBO	
August 7	Necaxa	FXX	
August 7	Demascus	Tubi	
August 8	Outlander: Blood of My Blood	Starz	
August 8	Standing By	Hulu	
August 11	Iron Man and His Awesome Friends	Disney Jr./Disney+	
August 11	A Sorority Mom's Guide to Rush!	Lifetime	
August 12	Alien: Earth	FX on Hulu	
August 12	Chef Grudge Match	Food Network	
August 13	Butterfly	Amazon Prime Video	
August 15	The Rainmaker	USA Network	
August 18	Lego Masters Jr.	Fox	
August 18	Are You My First?	Hulu	
August 19	Songs & Stories with Kelly Clarkson	NBC	
August 20	The Twisted Tale of Amanda Knox	Hulu	
August 22	Long Story Short	Netflix	
August 26	Love Thy Nader	Freeform/Hulu	
August 27	The Terminal List: Dark Wolf	Amazon Prime Video	

== September ==
First aired	Title	Channel	Source
September 1	The Chrisleys: Back to Reality	Lifetime	
September 1	The Runarounds	Amazon Prime Video	
September 4	NCIS: Tony & Ziva	Paramount+	
September 4	The Paper	Peacock	
September 7	Magnolia Table: At the Farm	Food Network/Magnolia Network	
September 7	Task	HBO	
September 8	Weather Hunters	PBS Kids	
September 8	Scrambled Up	Syndication	
September 8	Dr. Seuss's Red Fish, Blue Fish	Netflix	
September 8	Crowd Control	Dropout	
September 8	Secrets of Celebrity Sex Tapes	A&E	
September 12	Vampirina: Teenage Vampire	Disney Channel/Disney+	
September 17	Sin City Rehab	HGTV	
September 17	Next Gen Chef	Netflix	
September 18	Black Rabbit	Netflix	
September 19	Haunted Hotel	Netflix	
September 23	The Lowdown	FX	
September 24	99 to Beat	Fox	
September 24	Marvel Zombies	Disney+	
September 25	Cocaine Quarterback: Signal-Caller for the Cartel	Amazon Prime Video	
September 30	Chad Powers	Hulu	
September 30	On Brand with Jimmy Fallon	NBC	

== October ==
First aired	Title	Channel	Source
October 2	Charlotte's Web	HBO Max	
October 3	The Sisters Grimm	Apple TV+	
October 6	Dr. Seuss's Horton!	Netflix	
October 9	9-1-1: Nashville	ABC	
October 9	Boots	Netflix	
October 10	The Last Frontier	Apple TV+	
October 12	The Chair Company	HBO	
October 13	DMV	CBS	
October 13	Armorsaurs	Disney XD	
October 14	Splinter Cell: Deathwatch	Netflix	
October 15	Murdaugh: Death in the Family	Disney+/Hulu	
October 16	Devil in Disguise: John Wayne Gacy	Peacock	
October 17	The Chosen Adventures	Amazon Prime Video	
October 17	Boston Blue	CBS	
October 17	Sheriff Country	CBS	
October 19	The Road	CBS	
October 19	Haha, You Clowns	Adult Swim	
October 19	Hal & Harper	Mubi	
October 21	Wife Swap: The Real Housewives Edition	Bravo	
October 22	Dangerously Obese	TLC	
October 26	Talamasca: The Secret Order	AMC	
October 26	It: Welcome to Derry	HBO	
October 27	Baked With Love: Holiday	Hallmark Channel	
October 28	Don't Date Brandon	Paramount+	
October 29	About Face	TLC	

== November ==
First aired	Title	Channel	Source
November 2	I Love LA	HBO	
November 2	Robin Hood	MGM+	
November 3	Crutch	Paramount+	
November 4	All's Fair	Hulu	
November 5	Tournament of Champions: All-Star Christmas	Food Network	
November 6	All Her Fault	Peacock	
November 6	Death by Lightning	Netflix	
November 6	The Bad Guys: Breaking In	Netflix	
November 6	Alex vs. A-Rod	HBO	
November 7	Pluribus	Apple TV+	
November 7	Stumble	NBC	
November 9	Sweet Empire	Food Network	
November 10	Bat-Fam	Amazon Prime Video	
November 11	Hoarding for the Holidays	HGTV	
November 12	Surviving Mormonism	Bravo	
November 13	The Beast in Me	Netflix	
November 13	My Nightmare Stalker: The Eva LaRue Story	Paramount+	
November 13	Tiffany Haddish Goes Off	Peacock	
November 17	Gingerbread Land: The Biggest Little Holiday Competition	Food Network/Magnolia Network	
November 19	The Mighty Nein	Amazon Prime Video	
November 25	Good Sports with Kevin Hart and Kenan Thompson	Amazon Prime Video	
November 27	The Artist	The Network	

== December ==
First aired	Title	Channel	Source
December 2	Kimora: Back in the Fab Lane	E!	
December 2	Sean Combs: The Reckoning	Netflix	
December 3	Cheap A$$ Beach Houses	HGTV	
December 3	Ripple	Netflix	
December 4	The Abandons	Netflix	
December 4	Next Level Baker	Fox	
December 5	Twelve Dates 'Til Christmas	Hallmark Channel	
December 5	Spartacus: House of Ashur	Starz	
December 9	Fixer Upper: Colorado Mountain House	HGTV/Magnolia Network	
December 10	Simon Cowell: The Next Act	Netflix	
December 12	Taylor Swift: The Eras Tour: The End of an Era	Disney+	
December 17	What's in the Box?	Netflix	
December 26	Junk or Jackpot?	HGTV	
December 27	The Copenhagen Test	Peacock	
December 29	Members Only: Palm Beach	Netflix	
