= List of programs broadcast by NBC =

The National Broadcasting Company (NBC) is an American commercial broadcasting television network that launched in 1939. It is owned by the NBC Entertainment division of NBCUniversal, a subsidiary of Comcast, and is the oldest of the "Big Four" television networks. Below is a list of programs currently broadcast on the network.

== Current programming ==
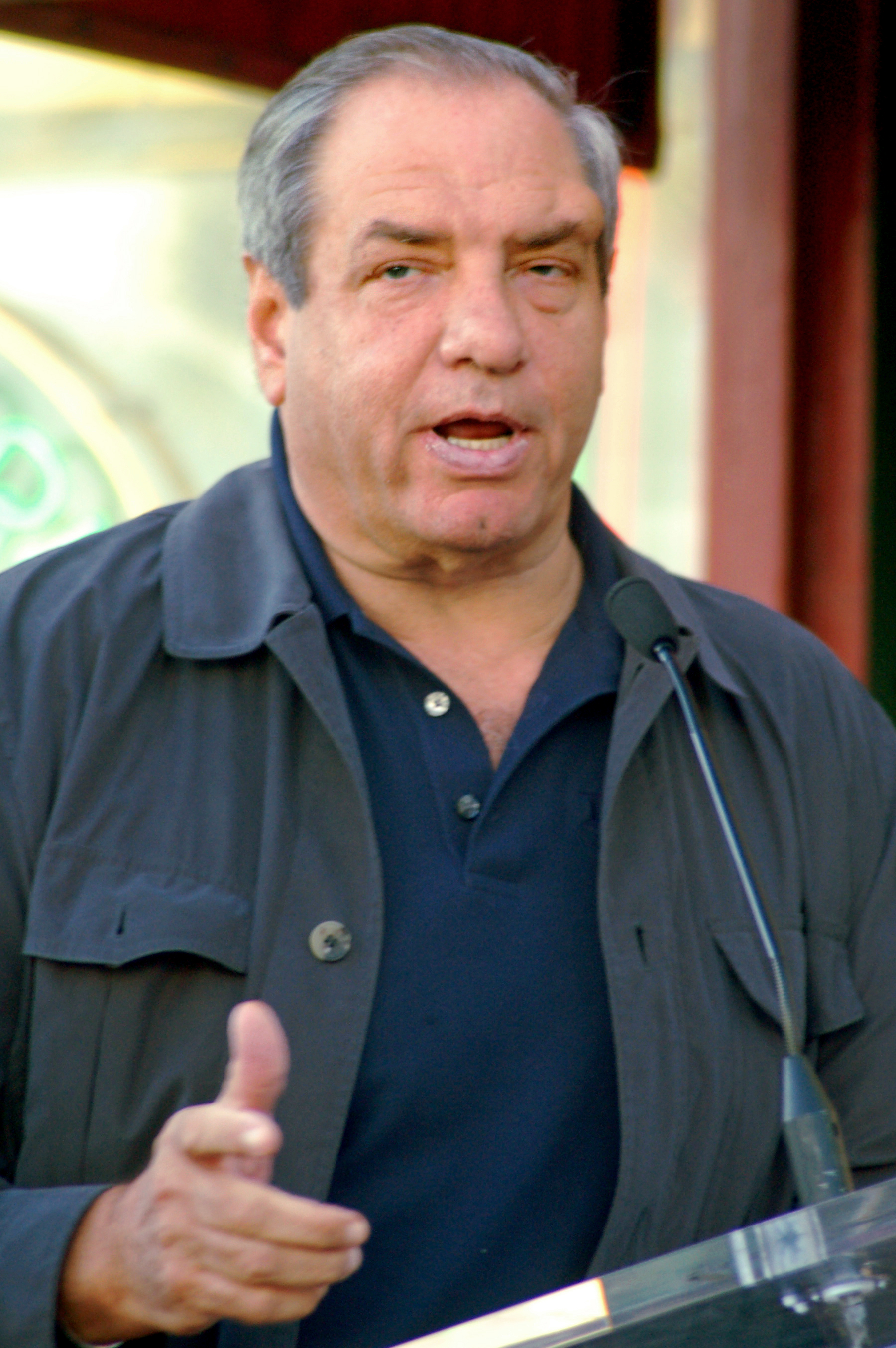
Dick Wolf – creator of the Law & Order and Chicago franchises

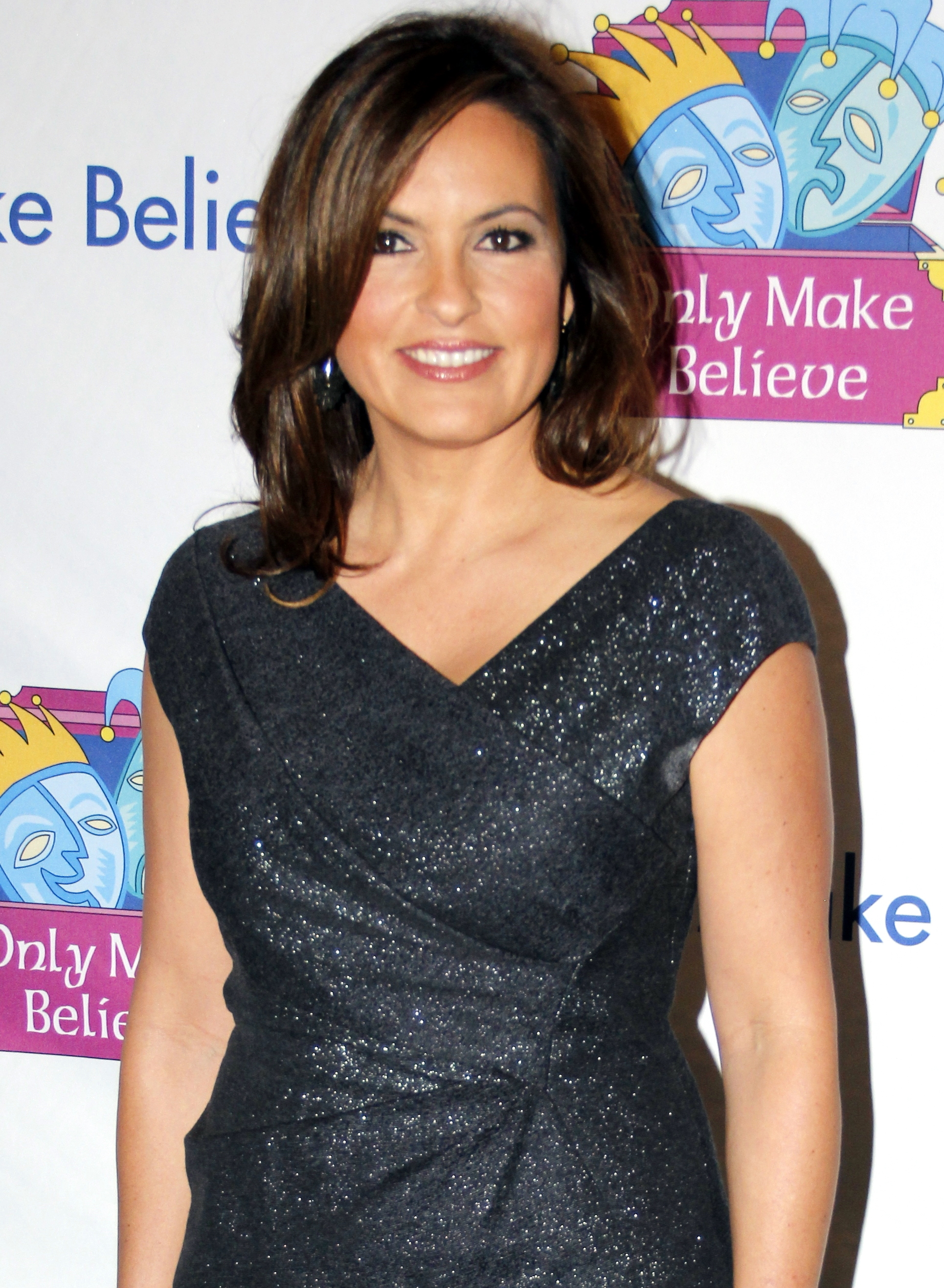
Mariska Hargitay – star of the long-running drama series Law & Order: Special Victims Unit

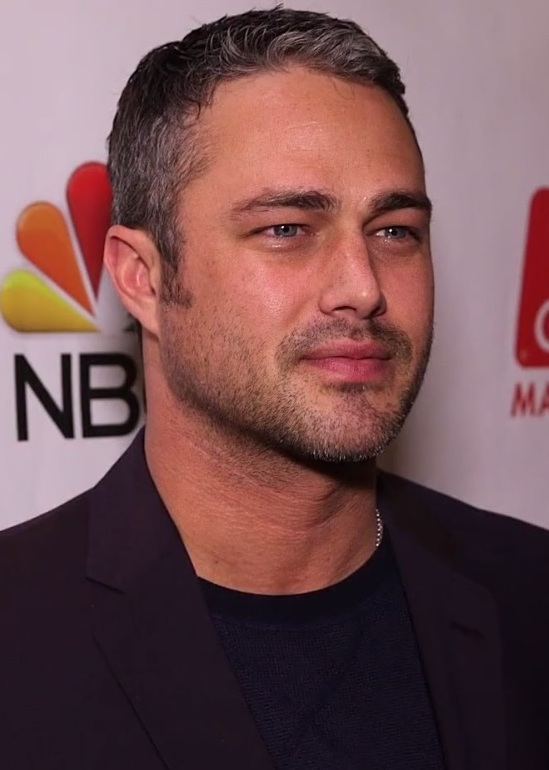
Taylor Kinney – star of the drama series Chicago Fire

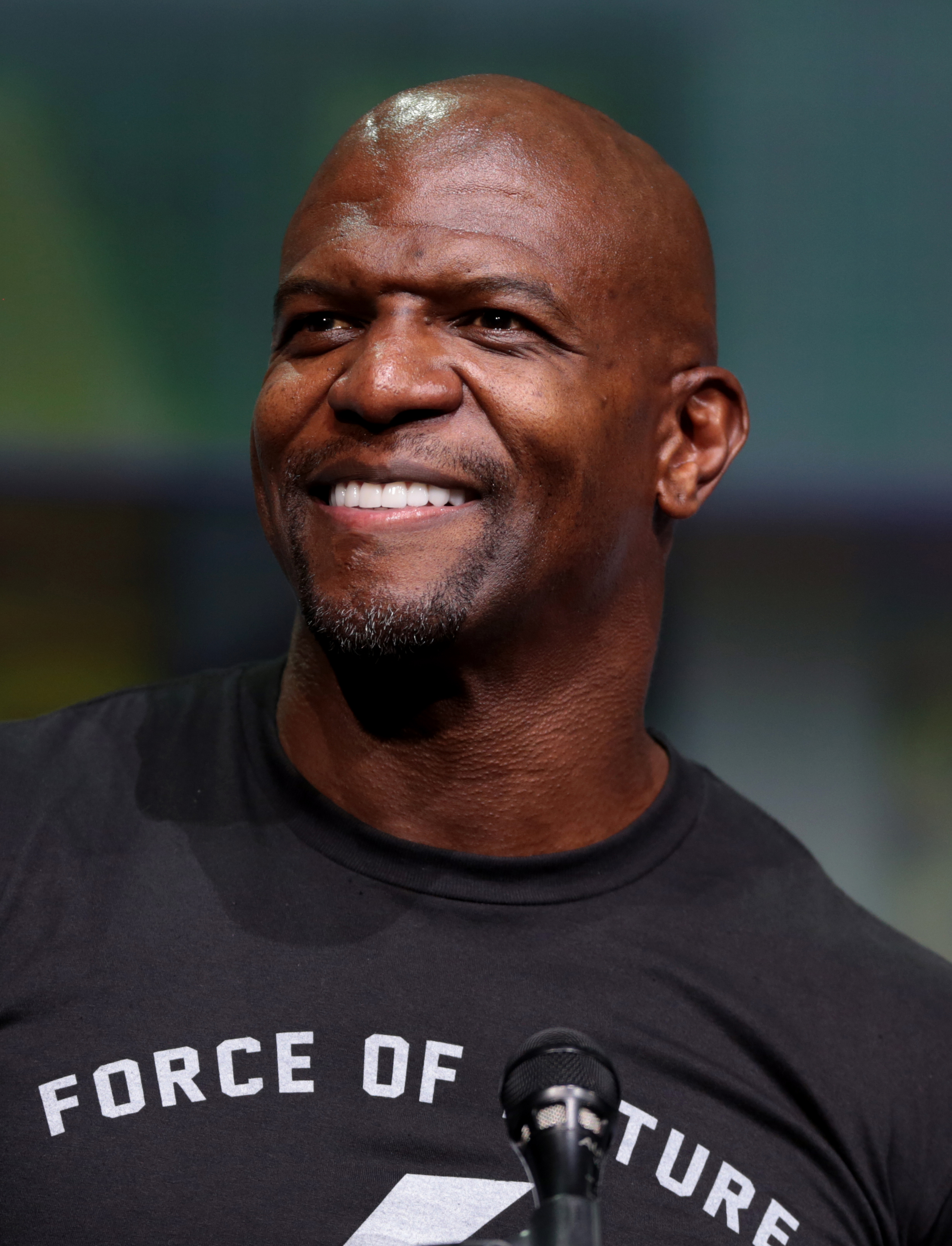
Terry Crews – host of the reality series America's Got Talent

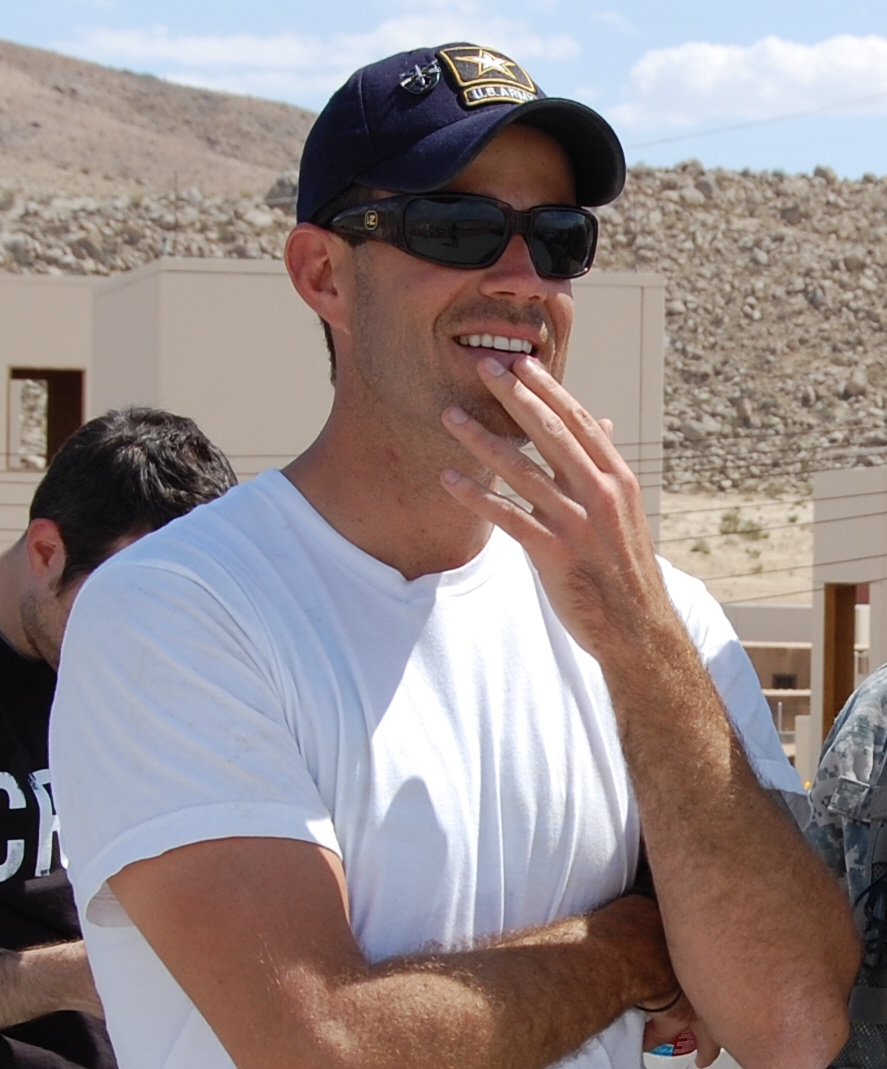
Carson Daly – host of the reality series The Voice

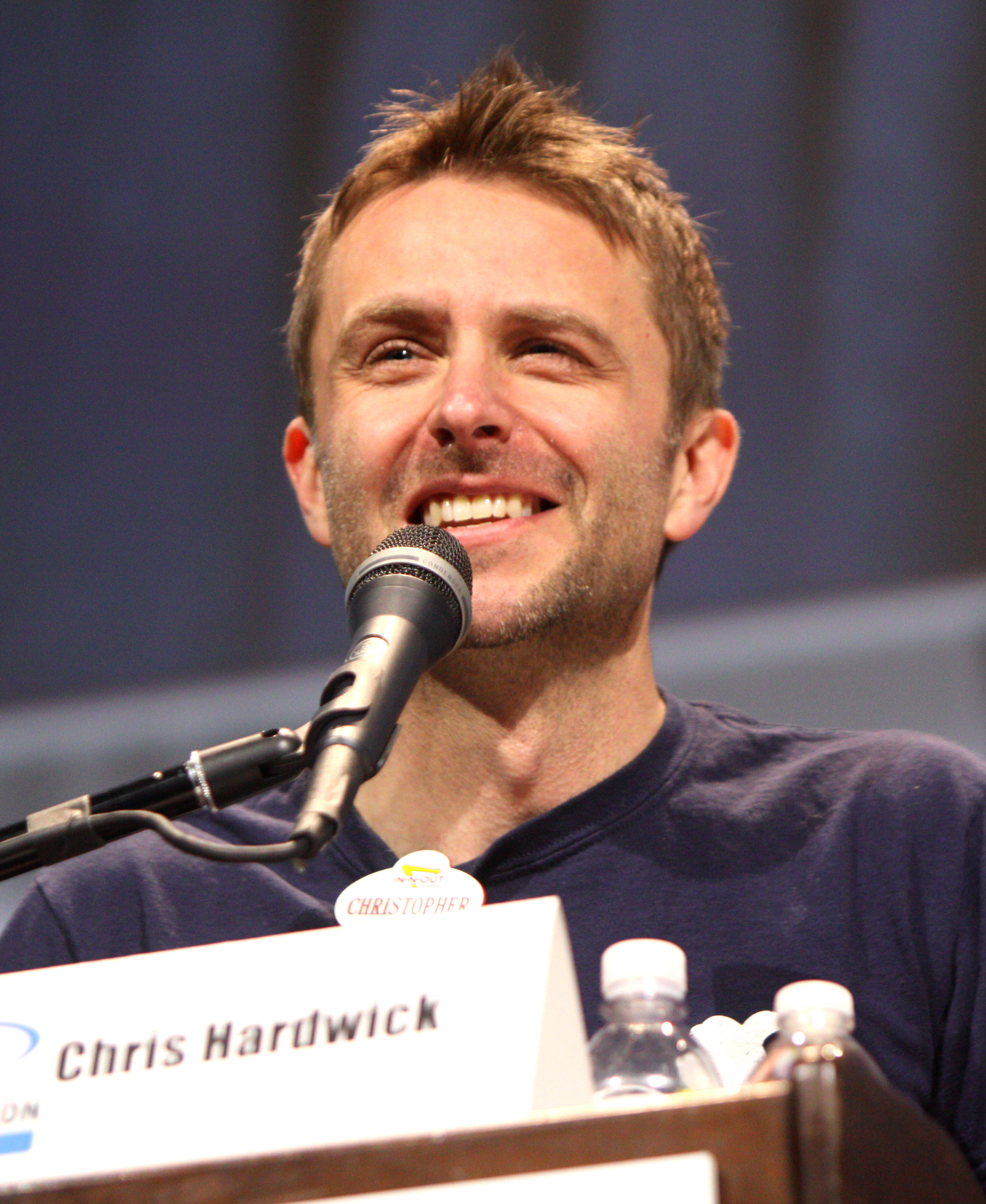
Chris Hardwick – host of the game show The Wall

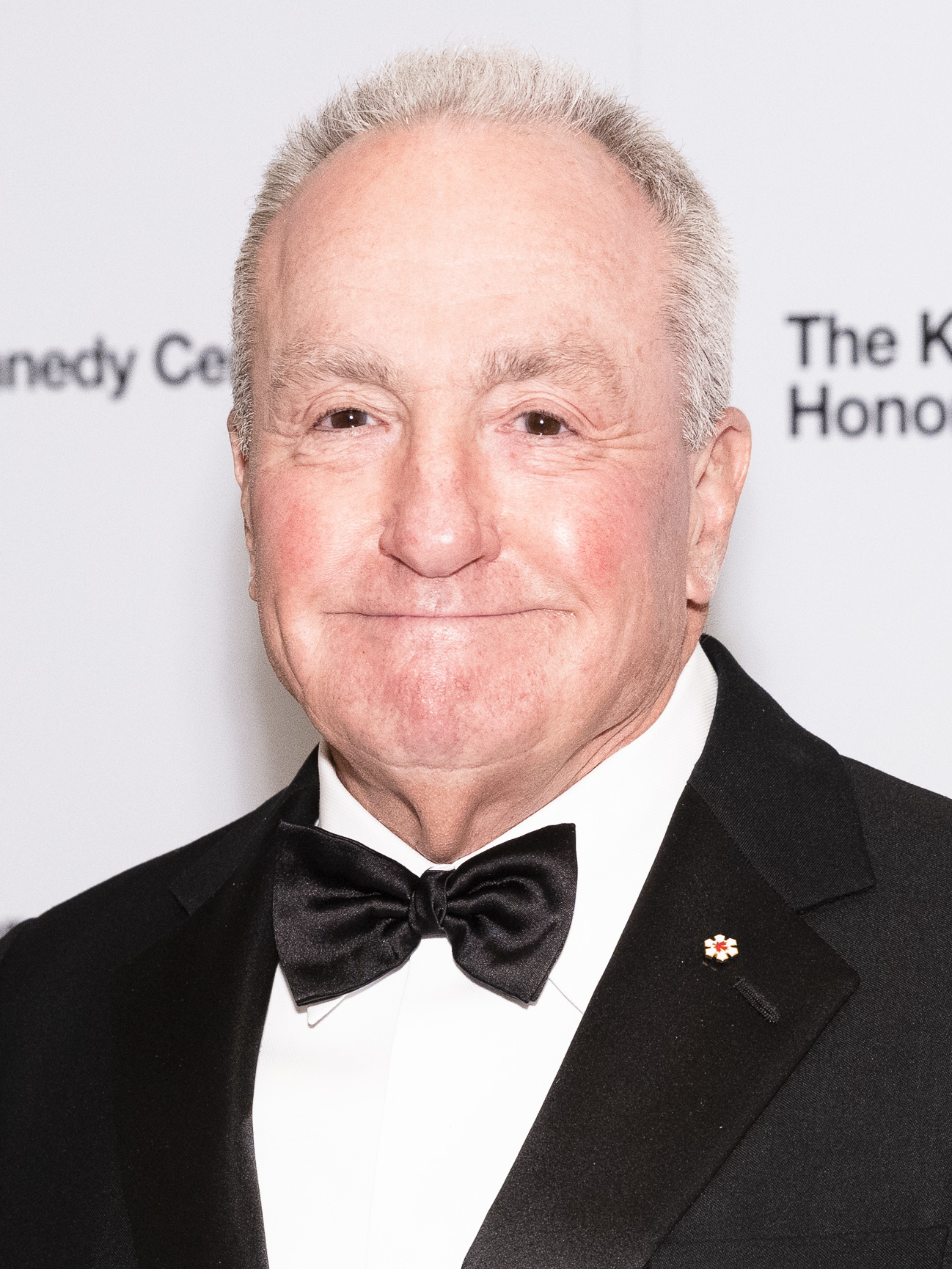
Lorne Michaels – creator of the long-running sketch comedy series Saturday Night Live

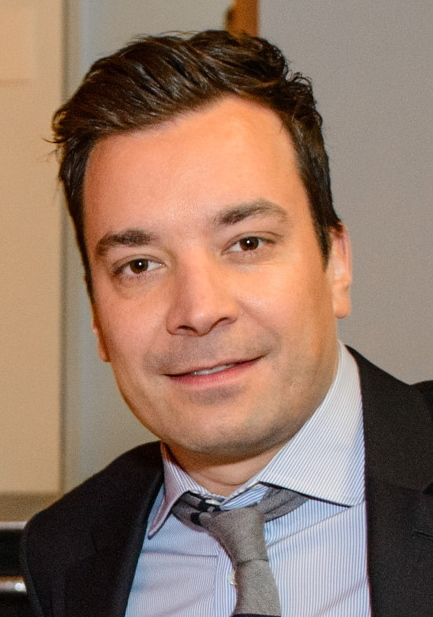
Jimmy Fallon – host of the talk show The Tonight Show Starring Jimmy Fallon

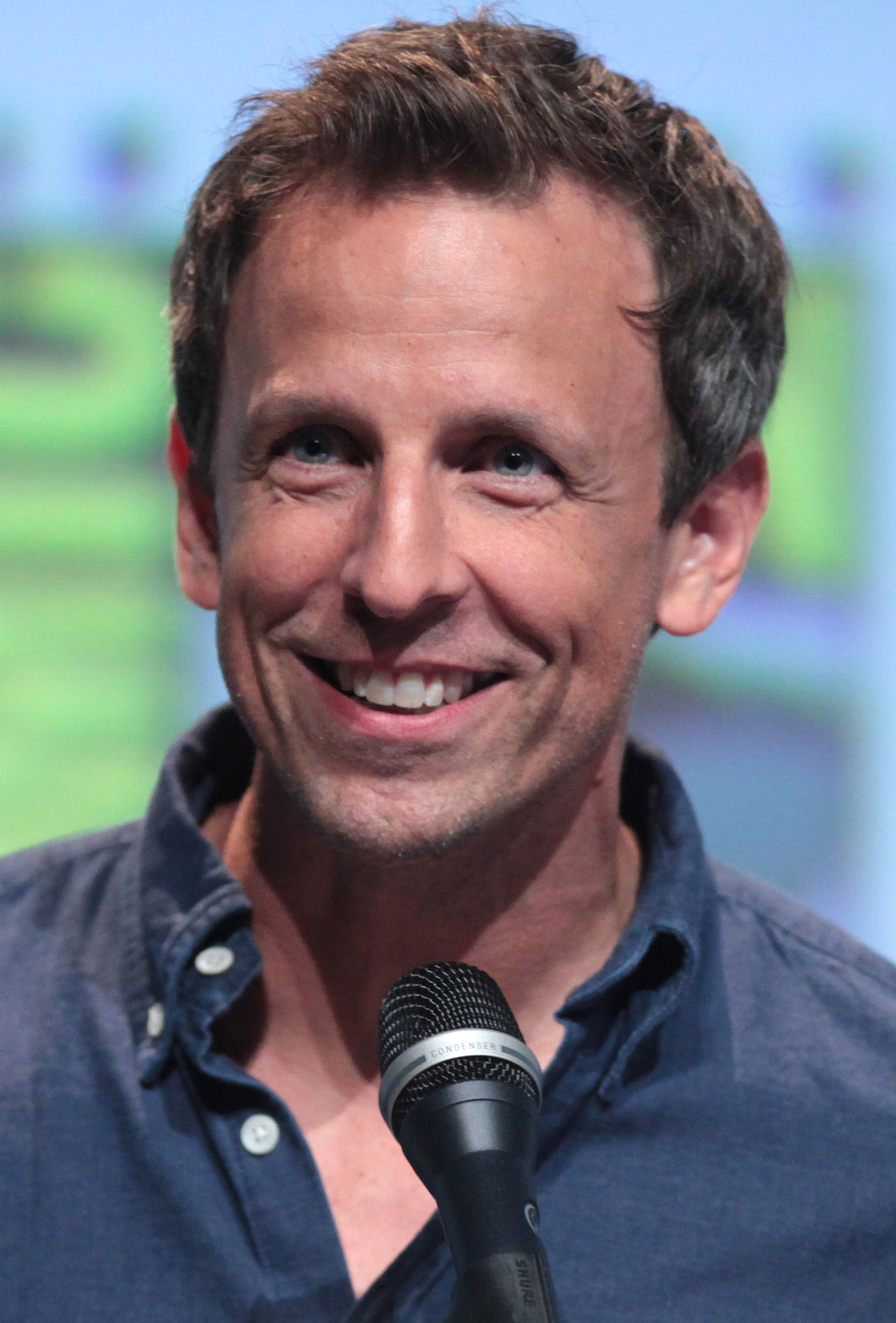
Seth Meyers – host of the talk show Late Night with Seth Meyers

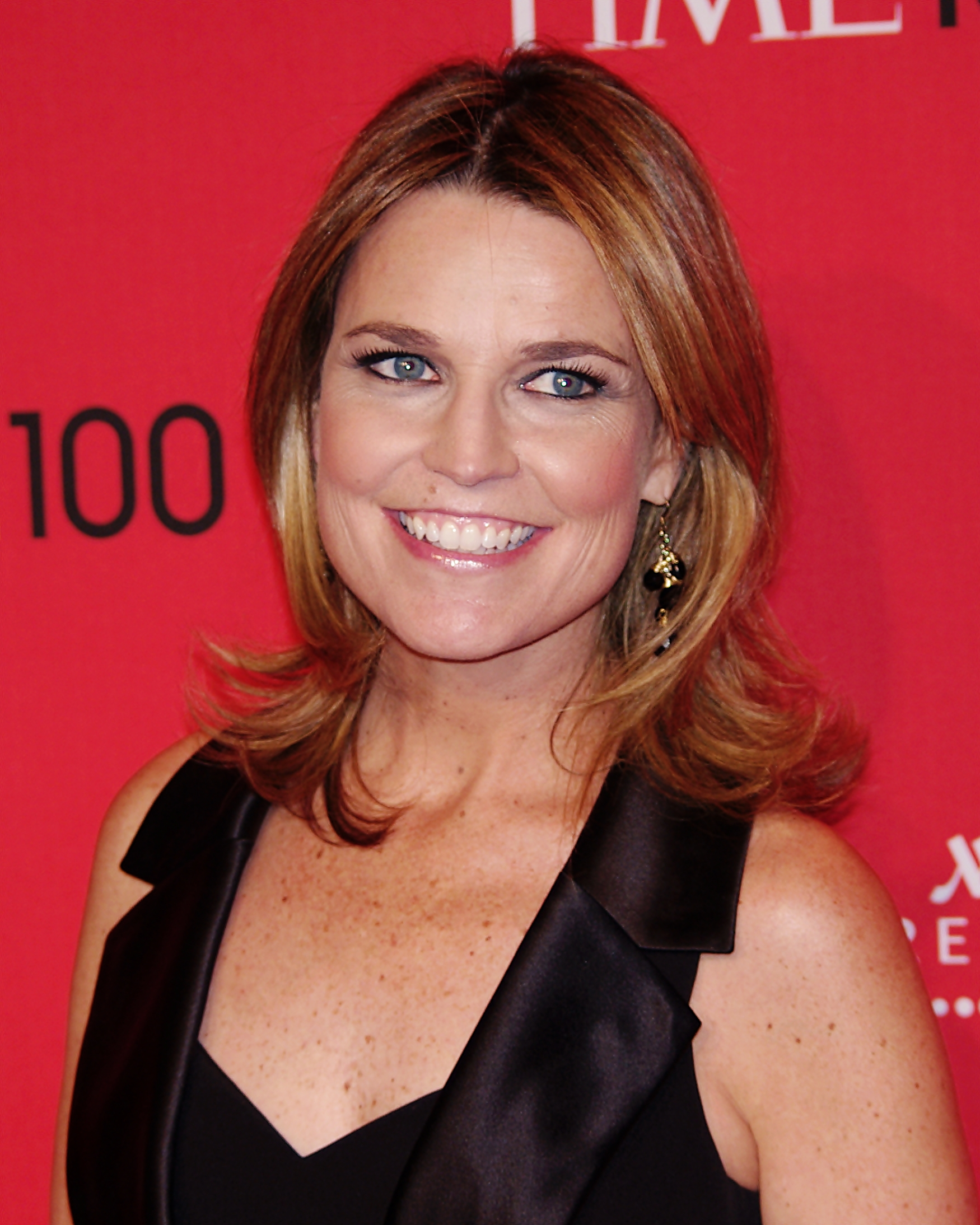
Savannah Guthrie – anchor of the Today Show

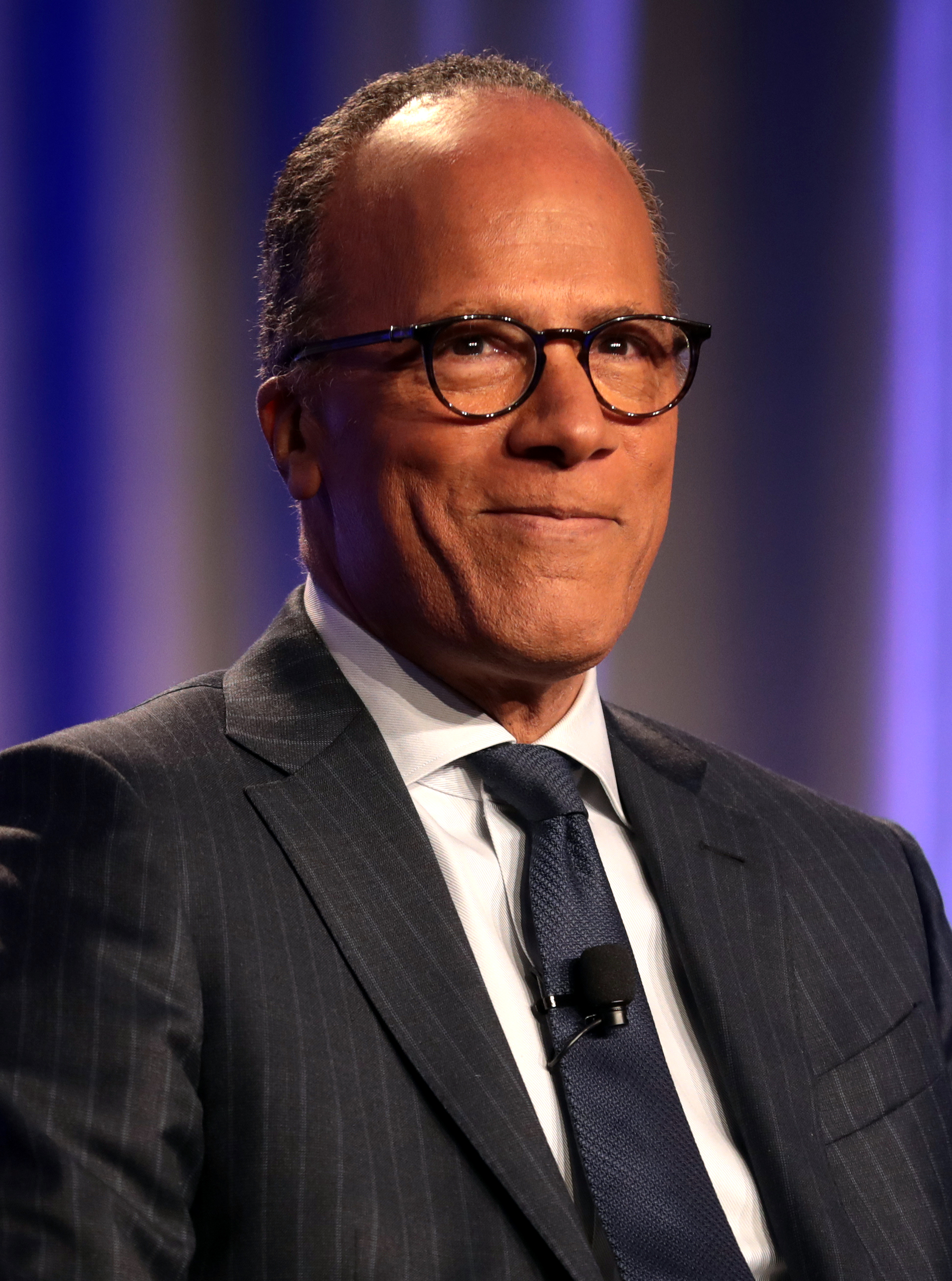
Lester Holt – anchor of Dateline

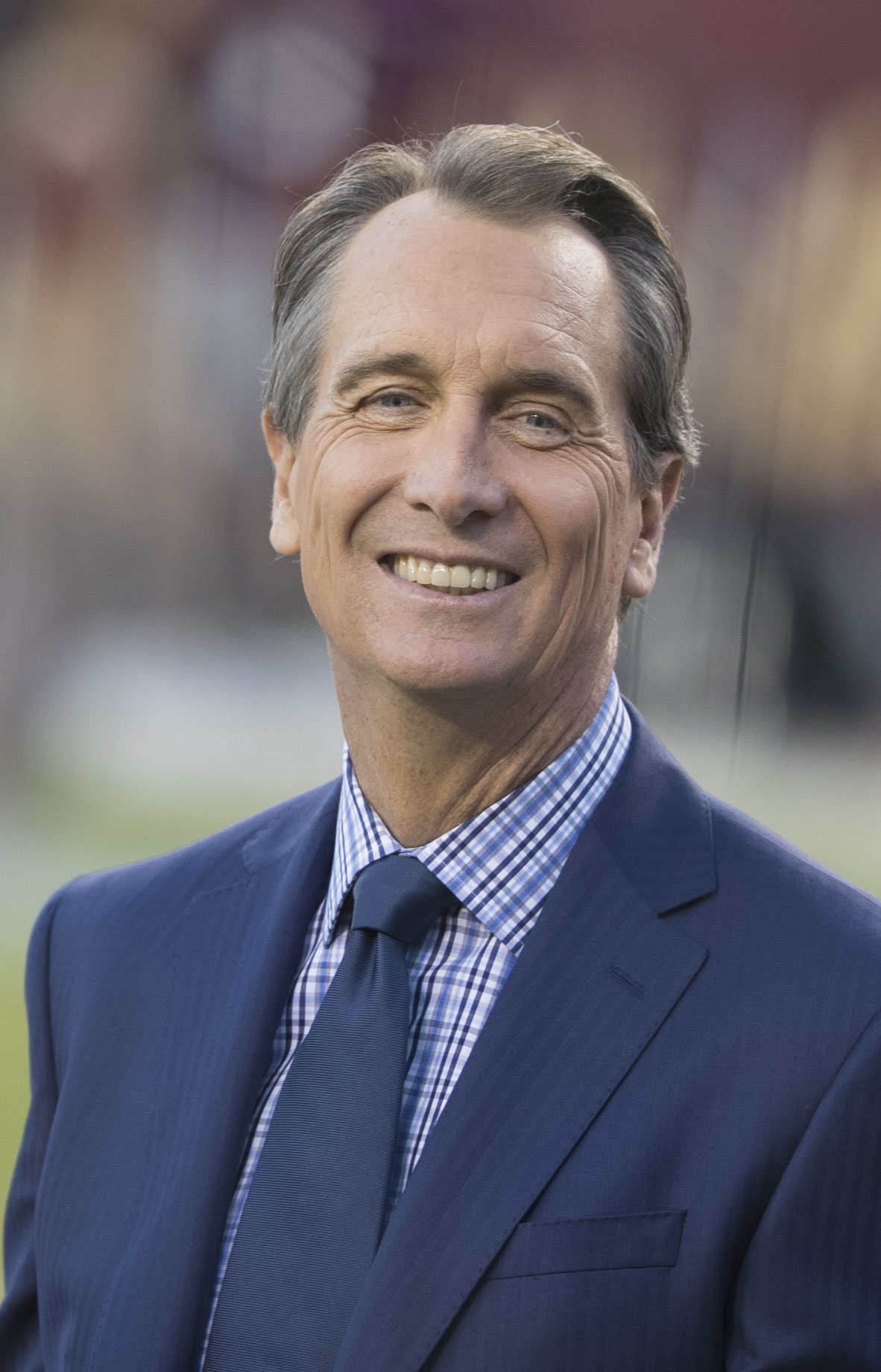
Cris Collinsworth – commentator for Sunday Night Football

=== Drama ===
| Title | Genre | Premiere | Seasons | Runtime | Status |
|---|---|---|---|---|---|
| Law & Order | Police procedural/Legal drama | September 13, 1990 (Note: The series originally ended on May 24, 2010, but resumed on February 24, 2022.) | 26 seasons, 550 episodes | 40–48 min | Season 26 ongoing |
| Law & Order: Special Victims Unit | Police procedural | September 20, 1999 | 28 seasons, 600 episodes | 40–44 min | Season 28 ongoing |
| Chicago Fire | Procedural drama | October 10, 2012 | 15 seasons, 301 episodes | 40–44 min | Season 15 ongoing |
| Chicago P.D. | Police procedural | January 8, 2014 | 14 seasons, 270 episodes | 40–44 min | Season 14 ongoing |
| Chicago Med | Medical drama | November 17, 2015 | 12 seasons, 225 episodes | 40–44 min | Season 12 ongoing |
| Line of Fire | Procedural drama | September 21, 2026 | 1 season, 7 episodes | 42 min | Season 1 ongoing |
Awaiting release
| The Rockford Files | Procedural drama | January 2, 2027 | TBA | TBA | Pending |

=== Comedy ===
| Title | Genre | Premiere | Seasons | Runtime | Status |
|---|---|---|---|---|---|
| Happy's Place | Sitcom | October 18, 2024 | 3 seasons, 40 episodes | 21 min | Season 3 ongoing |
| St. Denis Medical | Medical mockumentary sitcom | November 12, 2024 | 3 seasons, 38 episodes | 22 min | Season 3 ongoing |
| The Fall and Rise of Reggie Dinkins | Sports mockumentary sitcom | January 18, 2026 | 2 seasons, 12 episodes | 22 min | Season 2 ongoing |
| Newlyweds | Sitcom | October 23, 2026 | 1 season, 4 episodes | 22 min | Season 1 ongoing |
Awaiting release
| Sunset P.I. | Procedural sitcom | February 8, 2027 | TBA | TBA | Pending |

=== Unscripted ===
==== Docuseries ====
| Title | Subject | Premiere | Seasons | Runtime | Status |
|---|---|---|---|---|---|
| The Americas | Natural history | February 23, 2025 | 1 season, 11 episodes | 42–43 min | Renewed |
| Survival Mode | Natural disasters | July 7, 2025 | 1 season, 9 episodes | 43–44 min | Pending |

==== Reality ====
| Title | Genre | Premiere | Seasons | Runtime | Status |
|---|---|---|---|---|---|
| America's Got Talent | Reality competition | June 21, 2006 | 21 seasons, 508 episodes | 60–124 min | Pending |
| American Ninja Warrior | Reality competition | December 12, 2009 | 18 seasons, 262 episodes | 36–128 min | Renewed for seasons 19–20 |
| The Voice | Music competition | April 26, 2011 | 30 seasons, 689 episodes | 44–104 min | Season 30 ongoing Renewed |
| Destination X | Reality competition | May 27, 2025 | 1 season, 10 episodes | 48 min | Renewed |
| Songs & Stories with Kelly Clarkson | Reality television | August 19, 2025 | 1 season, 4 episodes | 42 min | Pending |
| The Traitors: New Blood | Reality competition | September 17, 2026 | 1 season, 12 episodes | 41–42 min | Renewed |

==== Game shows ====
| Title | Genre | Premiere | Seasons | Runtime | Status |
|---|---|---|---|---|---|
| The Wall | Game show | December 19, 2016 | 6 seasons, 101 episodes | 42–44 min | Season 6 ongoing |
| That's My Jam | Game show | November 29, 2021 | 2 seasons, 17 episodes | 44 min | Renewed (Note: On hiatus) |
| Password | Game show | August 9, 2022 | 3 seasons, 42 episodes | 43 min | Pending |

==== Variety ====
| Title | Genre | Premiere | Seasons | Runtime | Status |
|---|---|---|---|---|---|
| Saturday Night Live | Late-night sketch comedy | October 11, 1975 | 52 seasons, 1,014 episodes | 60–152 min | Season 52 ongoing |
| Today with Jenna & Sheinelle | Daytime talk show | September 10, 2007 | 11 seasons | 44–52 min | Season 11 ongoing |
| The Tonight Show Starring Jimmy Fallon | Late-night talk show | February 17, 2014 | 14 seasons, 2,350 episodes | 40 min | Season 14 ongoing Renewed |
| Late Night with Seth Meyers | Late-night talk show | February 24, 2014 | 14 seasons, 1,834 episodes | 40–41 min | Season 14 ongoing Renewed |
| Today 3rd Hour | Daytime talk show | October 29, 2018 | 7 seasons | 44–52 min | Season 7 ongoing |

=== Awards shows ===
- People's Choice Awards (2021)
- People's Choice Country Awards (2023)

=== News programming ===
- Meet the Press (1947)
- Today (1952)
- NBC Nightly News (1970)
- Saturday Today (1992)
- Dateline NBC (1992)
- Early Today (1999)
- Sunday Today with Willie Geist (2016)
- NBC News Daily (2022)

=== Saturday mornings ===
- The Voyager with Josh Garcia (2016)
- Earth Odyssey with Dylan Dreyer (2019)
- One Team: The Power of Sports (2021)
- Roots Less Traveled (2020)
- Harlem Globetrotters: Play it Forward (2022)
- Mutual of Omaha's Wild Kingdom: Protecting the Wild (2023)

=== Specials ===
- Macy's Thanksgiving Day Parade (experimental local broadcasts in 1939, then again starting from 1945; broadcast nationally since 1953)
- The National Dog Show (since 2002)
- Macy's Fourth of July Spectacular (acquired the broadcast rights in 2000)
- How the Grinch Stole Christmas! (acquired the broadcast rights from ABC in 2015)
- Shrek the Halls (acquired the broadcast rights from ABC in 2023)
- Frosty the Snowman (acquired the broadcast rights from CBS in 2024)
- Rudolph the Red-Nosed Reindeer (acquired the broadcast rights from CBS in 2024; previously aired annually from 1964 to 1971)

=== Sports programming ===
- Olympics on NBC, which includes:
  - Summer Olympic Games
  - Winter Olympic Games
- NASCAR on NBC, which includes:
  - The Brickyard 400
  - The Coke Zero Sugar 400
- NFL on NBC, which includes:
  - Football Night in America
  - Sunday Night Football
  - NFL Kickoff game
  - The NFL on Thanksgiving Day
  - Select playoff games
  - The Super Bowl (every four years)
- NBA on NBC, which includes:
  - NBA Showtime
  - Tuesday night regional doubleheaders
  - Sunday Night Basketball
  - Opening night, Martin Luther King Day, Veterans Day, and Presidents' Day games
  - All-Star Weekend (excluding All-Star Celebrity Game)
  - All-Star Game
  - Select playoff games (including one Conference Finals series in even-numbered years)
- Major League Baseball on NBC, which includes:
  - Sunday Night Baseball
  - MLB Sunday Leadoff (select simulcasts)
  - Opening Day and Labor Day games
  - Major League Baseball draft
  - All-Star Futures Game
  - Wild Card Series games
- WNBA on NBC, includes select games including seven semifinals series and three finals series
- Golf Channel on NBC, which includes:
  - The Open Championship
  - The Players Championship
  - The Ryder Cup
  - Presidents Cup
  - Scottish Open
  - Senior PGA Championship
- Thoroughbred Racing on NBC, which includes the following races:
  - Kentucky Derby
  - Preakness Stakes
  - Belmont Stakes
  - Breeders' Cup Classic
  - Santa Anita Derby
- College Football on NBC Sports and high school football, including:
  - Notre Dame Football on NBC
  - Big Ten football
    - The Big Ten Championship Game (2026)
  - The Bayou Classic
  - The All-American Bowl
- US Olympic Trials
- USA Basketball men's and women's games
- World Athletics Championships
- Select Diamond League meetings, which includes the Prefontaine Classic
- USA Outdoor Track and Field Championships
- FINA World Aquatics Championships
- United States Swimming National Championships
- Select matches of the Premier League
- U.S. Figure Skating Championships
- Select stages of the Tour de France
- Select stages of the USA Pro Cycling Challenge

== Upcoming programming ==
=== Unscripted ===
==== Game shows ====
| Title | Genre | Premiere | Seasons | Runtime | Status |
|---|---|---|---|---|---|
| Wordle | Game show | 2026–27 season | TBA | TBA | Series order |

=== Pilots ===
==== Reality ====
- Love Takes a Village

=== In development ===
==== Drama ====
| Title | Genre |
|---|---|
| Dr. Lucia | Medical drama |
| Duo | Musical drama |
| Family Reservations | Drama |
| Fire with Fire | Police procedural |
| Gatsby | Police procedural |
| Look What You Made Me Do | Drama |
| Keats | Police procedural |
| Need to Know | Crime drama |
| New Amsterdam: Tomorrow | Medical drama |
| Nowhere | Drama |
| Pops | Medical drama |
| Sky on Fire | Political drama |
| Spotless | Crime drama |
| Truth | Crime drama |
| Untitled 66th North Precinct adaptation | Crime procedural |
| Untitled J.J. Bailey series | Drama |
| Untitled Royal Pains reboot | Medical comedy drama |
| Vacationland | Police procedural |
| What the Dead Know | Crime procedural |
| Wild Life | Crime procedural |
| Worth | Detective drama |

==== Comedy ====
| Title | Genre |
|---|---|
| Car Wash | Sitcom |
| Co-Dependents | Sitcom |
| Coach | Sitcom |
| Foreign Service | Sitcom |
| Forklift | Sitcom |
| The Game Room | Sitcom |
| Hotel Sofia | Sitcom |
| Last Chance Lawyer | Comedy |
| Something Wicked | Sitcom |
| Taste | Sitcom |
| Untitled Alissa Neubauer series | Sitcom |
| Untitled David Hyde Pierce series | Comedy |

==== Game shows ====
| Title | Genre |
|---|---|
| Win Win! | Game show |
