= The Snake (TV series) =

American television reality show

- Genre: Reality show
- Presented by: Jim Jefferies
- Country of origin: United States
- Original language: English
- No. of seasons: 1
- No. of episodes: 10

Production
- Executive producers: SallyAnn Salsano; Frank Miccolis; Kim Green
- Camera setup: Multi-camera
- Production companies: Fox Entertainment; 495 Productions

Original release
- Network: Fox
- Release: June 10 – August 26, 2025

The Snake is an American reality competition series hosted by Jim Jefferies that aired on Fox from June 10 to August 26, 2025. In May 2026, the series was canceled after one season.

== Format ==
The contestants compete in challenges based around manipulation, persuasion, and deception; whoever wins the challenge receives a snake medallion and the title of "the Snake". Each episode concludes with an elimination process known as the "Saving Ceremony": the Snake nominates the first contestant to be declared safe. In turn, the contestant nominates the next contestant to be saved, with this cycle continuing until only two contestants remain. At this point, the Snake selects the final contestant to be saved, with the remaining contestant being eliminated.

== Production ==
On April 22, 2025, it was announced that Fox had ordered the series, with Jim Jefferies as the host. On April 24, it was announced that the series would premiere on June 10. On May 15, the contestants were announced. On May 11, 2026, the series was canceled after one season.

== Overview ==
=== Contestants ===
Contestant	Manipulator Name	Age	Hometown	Entered	Exited	Result
Kailee Fessock	The Police Officer	TBA	Hollywood, Florida	Episode 1	Episode 1	Eliminated 1st (By Kethryn at Saving Ceremony 1)
Mena Samara	The Bounty Hunter	TBA	Moore, Oklahoma	Episode 1	Episode 2	Eliminated 2nd (By Jack at Saving Ceremony 2)
Bryan Sobolewski	The Ex-Con	TBA	Lewisville, Texas	Episode 1	Episode 3	Eliminated 3rd & 4th (By Jacob & MacLaine at Saving ceremony 3)
Cody Brewer	The Bull Rider	TBA	Cookeville, Tennessee	Episode 1	Episode 3	Eliminated 3rd & 4th (By Jacob & MacLaine at Saving ceremony 3)
Jacob Buchholz	The Pastor	TBA	Upland, California	Episode 1	Episode 4	Eliminated 5th (By Alyssa at Saving Ceremony 4)
Devonte Kavanaugh	The Poker Player	TBA	Los Angeles, California	Episode 1	Episode 5	Eliminated 6th (By Derek at Saving Ceremony 5)
Christine Pierre	The Teacher	29	Somerset, New Jersey	Episode 2	Episode 6	Eliminated 7th (By Jordan at Saving Ceremony 6)
Kethryn Cavender	The Tech Manager	TBA	New York City, New York	Episode 1	Episode 7	Eliminated 8th (By John at Saving Ceremony 7)
John Bauters	The Politician	TBA	Emeryville, California	Episode 4	Episode 8	Eliminated 9th (By Jack at Saving Ceremony 8)
Amanda Short	The Lawyer	TBA	Richmond, Virginia	Episode 1	Episode 9	Eliminated 10th & 11th (By Brett & Jordan at Saving ceremony 9)
MacLaine Funsch	The Indianapolis Colts Cheerleader	TBA	Carmel, Indiana	Episode 1	Episode 9	Eliminated 10th & 11th (By Brett & Jordan at Saving ceremony 9)
Derek North	The Detective	TBA	Naperville, Illinois	Episode 1	Episode 10	Eliminated 12th (By competition)
Alyssa Grassie	The OnlyFans Content Creator	TBA	Miami, Florida	Episode 1	Episode 10	Eliminated 13th, 14th & 15th (By competition)
Jack Micco	The Non-Profit Director	TBA	Austin, Texas	Episode 1	Episode 10	Eliminated 13th, 14th & 15th (By competition)
Jordan DeJesse	The HR Director	29	Philadelphia, Pennsylvania	Episode 1	Episode 10	Eliminated 13th, 14th & 15th (By competition)
Brett Covalt	The Boxer	TBA	Tampa, Florida	Episode 1	Episode 10	Runner-Up
Frank Lavecchia	The Makeup Artist	TBA	Charlotte, North Carolina	Episode 1	Episode 10	Winner

=== Results ===
Place	Contestant	Episode									
Place	Contestant	1	2	3	4	5	6	7	8	9	10
1	Frank	SAFE	SAFE	SAFE	SAFE	SAFE	SAFE	SAFE	SAVED	SAFE	WINNER/SNAKE
2	Brett	SAFE	SAFE	SAFE	SAFE	SAVED	SAFE	SAFE	SAFE	SNAKE	RUNNER-UP
3/4/5	Alyssa	SAFE	SAFE	SAFE	SNAKE	SAFE	SAFE	SAFE	SAFE	SAVED	OUT
3/4/5	Jack	SAFE	SNAKE	SAFE	SAFE	SAFE	SAFE	SAFE	SNAKE	SAFE	OUT
3/4/5	Jordan	SAFE	SAFE	SAFE	SAFE	SAFE	SNAKE	SAFE	SAFE	SNAKE	OUT
6	Derek	SAFE	SAFE	SAVED	SAVED	SNAKE	SAFE	SAFE	SAFE	SAFE	OUT
7/8	Amanda	SAFE	SAFE	SAFE	SAFE	SAFE	SAFE	SAFE	SAFE	OUT	
7/8	MacLaine	SAVED	SAVED	SNAKE	SAFE	SAFE	SAFE	SAVED	SAFE	OUT	
9	John	N/A			IN (Note: Christine and John entered the game in the middle of the episode, but they were granted safety upon arriving at the saving ceremony due to not being in the game when the challenge took place.)	SAFE	SAVED	SNAKE	OUT		
10	Kethryn	SNAKE	SAFE	SAFE	SAFE	SAFE	SAFE	OUT			
11	Christine	N/A	IN	SAVED	SAFE	SAFE	OUT				
12	Devonte	SAFE	SAFE	SAFE	SAFE	OUT					
13	Jacob	SAFE	SAFE	SNAKE	OUT						
14/15	Bryan	SAFE	SAFE	OUT							
14/15	Cody	SAFE	SAFE	OUT							
16	Mena	SAFE	OUT								
17	Kailee	OUT									

The player won the challenge and became the Snake.
The player was saved during the Saving Ceremony.
The player was saved during the Cobra Cane Challenge at the Saving Ceremony.
This player was at the end of the Snake and was saved from elimination by the Snake.
This player was at the end of the Snake and was eliminated by the Snake.
This player lost the challenge and was eliminated.

=== Saving Ceremony ===
Saving Ceremony Chain
Order	1	2	3 (Note: This episode featured the Two-Headed Snake twist, which led to a Double Elimination. Jacob & MacLaine became the two-headed snake, and they jointly began the chain of safety. 4 players were left at the end of the Snake, and Jacob and MacLaine each saved one player, leaving the other two to be eliminated.)	4	5	6	7	8	9 (Note: This episode featured the Two-Headed Snake twist, which led to a Double Elimination. Brett & Jordan became the two-headed snake, and they jointly began the chain of safety. 3 players were left at the end of the Snake, and Brett and Jordan both saved one player, leaving the other two to be eliminated.)	10
Snake(s)	Kethryn	Jack	Jacob & MacLaine	Alyssa	Derek	Jordan	John	Jack	Brett & Jordan	Frank
2	Jordan	Christine (Note: Christine entered the game in the middle of the episode, and she was granted immunity from elimination. The chain began with Snake Jack saving Brett.)	Amanda	John (Note: John entered the game in the middle of the episode, and he was granted immunity from elimination. The chain began with Snake Alyssa saving Frank.)	John	Kethryn	Alyssa	MacLaine	Frank	Kethryn (Note: Brett and Frank sit that person out.)
3	Bryan	Brett	Jack	Frank	Christine	Alyssa	Frank	Brett	Derek	Alyssa (Note: Brett sits that person out.)
4	Frank	Devonte	Devonte	Jordan	Amanda	Frank	Amanda	Derek	Jack	Jack (Note: Frank sits that person out.)
5	Alyssa	Kethryn	Brett	Kethryn	Frank	Amanda	Derek	Amanda	Alyssa	Jacob
6	Jack	Bryan	Kethryn	MacLaine	Alyssa	Derek	Brett	Jordan		Derek
7	Devonte	Jordan	Jordan	Jack	Kethryn	MacLaine	Jordan (Note: Jordan was saved by the Cobra Cane Challenge. As a result, Brett skipped Jordan and saved Jack.)	Alyssa		Jordan
8	Brett	Alyssa	Alyssa	Brett	Jordan	Jack	Jack	Frank		John (Note: Brett picks that person to choose.)
9	Mena	Frank	Frank	Devonte	MacLaine	Brett	MacLaine			MacLaine
10	Amanda	Cody	Christine	Amanda	Jack	John				
11	Jacob	Derek	Derek	Christine	Brett					
12	Derek	Jacob		Derek						
13	Cody	Amanda								
14	MacLaine	MacLaine								
Eliminated	Kailee (by Kethryn)	Mena (by Jack)	Bryan & Cody (by Jacob & MacLaine)	Jacob (by Alyssa)	Devonte (by Derek)	Christine (by Jordan)	Kethryn (by John)	John (by Jack)	Amanda & MacLaine (by Brett & Jordan)	Brett (by John)

== Episodes ==
No.	Title	Original release date	Prod. code	U.S. viewers (millions)	Rating (18-49)
1	"Who Can You Trust?"	June 10, 2025	SNK-101	0.83	0.1
Episode 1 Results: Person in Charge: Mena Strongest Competitors: Amanda, Kailee, Cody, Jacob, MacLaine, Derek Weakest Competitors: Alyssa, Bryan, Devonte Jack, Jordan, Brett, Kethryn, Frank Snake Challenge: What's In The Box?: Every competitor deemed 'Weak' competed in this challenge. Contestants each chose a box that they couldn't see inside. They felt for what was inside: A live snake or the snake medallion. 7 boxes contained a live snake and only 1 contained the medallion. After feeling what was in their boxes, contestants were given the opportunity to keep their box, or exchange their box for another contestants box. Whoever ended up with the medallion was the winner, also known as The Snake.; Box Trades: Devonte trades his box with Kethryn; Jordan keeps her box; Brett trades his box with Jack; Kethryn trades her box with Devonte; Frank trades his box with Brett; Alyssa keeps her box; Jack trades his box with Frank; Bryan trades his box with Jordan; Box Trade Winner/Snake: Kethryn Saving Ceremony: Kethryn saves Jordan; Jordan saves Bryan; Bryan saves Frank; Frank saves Alyssa; Alyssa saves Jack; Jack saves Devonte; Devonte saves Brett; Brett Saves Mena; Mena saves Amanda; Amanda saves Jacob; Jacob saves Derek; Derek saves Cody; Kethryn saves MacLaine; Eliminated: Kailee
2	"Pick Your Poison"	June 17, 2025	SNK-102	0.75	0.1
Episode 2 Results: Snake Challenge: Disgusting Drinks: Contestants were randomly assigned an opponent to go 1V1 against. They were both given the same gross drink, which were all composed of random mixes of disgusting food and drinks. On go, they raced to see who would finish the drink first without spitting it out. Whoever won would move on to the final round, while the other player was eliminated. A new drink was then given in the next 1V1. Once all first round matches were done, all the winners competed in the final round. At once, they raced to see who would finish the 3 gross items on the plate. Jack won, but Jacob called him out as he saw him spit some out into Jacob's bucket. After production watched the video evidence, it was deemed that another round had to play. Jack won again, this time for real, and became The Snake.; Drinking Challenge: Derek vs. Amanda (BOTH LOST); Cody (WINNER) vs. Kethryn; MacLaine (WINNER) vs. Jordan; Jacob (WINNER) vs. Alyssa; Jack (WINNER) vs. Mena; Frank vs. Bryan (WINNER); Devonte (WINNER) vs. Brett; Drinking Challenge winner/Snake: Jack New Competitor: Christine Saving Ceremony: Jim saves Christine; Jack saves Brett; Brett saves Devonte; Devonte saves Kethryn; Kethryn saves Bryan; Bryan saves Jordan; Jordan saves Alyssa; Alyssa saves Frank; Frank saves Cody; Cody saves Derek; Derek saves Jacob; Jacob saves Amanda; Jack saves MacLaine; Eliminated: Mena
3	"Two-Headed Snake"	June 24, 2025	SNK-103	0.76	0.1
Episode 3 Results: Snake Challenge: Partner Puzzle: Contestants are divided into teams of two. Each team member goes into a connected coffin with their teammate with their heads poking out at the ends. Each box contains thousands of cockroaches. Team members have different parts of a puzzle and have to solve it together by communicating to each other. If any team member quits at any time, the team is eliminated. The team to solve it the quickest becomes The Two-Headed Snake.; Partners: MacLaine & Jacob (WINNERS); Brett & Christine; Devonte & Jack; Jordan & Kethryn; Bryan & Frank; Amanda & Cody; Derek & Alyssa; Puzzle Challenge winner and Two-Headed Snake: MacLaine & Jacob Saving Ceremony: MacLaine & Jacob save Amanda; Amanda saves Jack; Jack saves Devonte; Devonte saves Brett; Brett saves Kethryn; Kethryn saves Jordan; Jordan saves Alyssa; Alyssa saves Frank; MacLaine saves Christine; Jacob saves Derek; Eliminated: Bryan & Cody
4	"Surprise Snake"	July 8, 2025	SNK-104	0.81	0.1
Episode 4 Results: Snake Challenge: Hidden Medallion: Contestants are invited to 'dinner' where at first everything seems normal. Jim informs everyone that it is safe so eat and so contestants start eating. Before the dinner began and contestants arrived, the snake medallion was hidden under one person's dinner. Whoever found it with their food, became the snake.; Dinner Challenge winner and Snake: Alyssa New Competitor: John Saving Ceremony: Jim saves John; Alyssa saves Frank; Frank saves Jordan; Jordan saves Kethryn; Kethryn saves MacLaine; MacLaine saves Jack; Jack saves Brett; Brett saves Devonte; Devonte saves Amanda; Amanda saves Christine; Jack saves Derek; Eliminated: Jacob
5	"Life Line"	July 22, 2025	SNK-105	0.74	0.1
Episode 5 Results: Advantage/Disadvantage: Derek (Advantage) (by Jacob) Obstacle Challenge: Jordan (WINNER) vs. Kethryn; MacLaine vs. Jack (WINNER); Amanda (WINNER) vs. Devonte; Christine vs. John (WINNER); Frank vs. Alyssa (WINNER); Brett vs. Derek (WINNER); Obstacle Challenge Winner/Snake: Derek Saving Ceremony: Derek saves John; John saves Christine; Christine saves Amanda; Amanda saves Frank; Frank saves Alyssa; Alyssa saves Kethryn; Kethryn saves Jordan; Jordan saves MacLaine; MacLaine saves Jack; Derek saves Brett; Eliminated: Devonte
6	"Bury Your Secrets"	July 29, 2025	SNK-106	0.87	0.1
Episode 6 Results: Advantage/Disadvantage: Derek (Disadvantage) (by Devonte) Coffin Challenge Winner/Snake: Jordan Saving Ceremony: Jordan saves Kethryn; Kethryn saves Alyssa; Alyssa saves Frank; Frank saves Amanda; Amanda saves Derek; Derek saves MacLaine; MacLaine saves Jack; Jack saves Brett; Jordan saves John; Eliminated: Christine
7	"Nowhere to Hide"	August 5, 2025	SNK-107	0.78	0.1
Episode 7 Results: Advantage/Disadvantage: John (Advantage) (by Christine) Mongoose Challenge: Brett finds the Mongoose and takes Amanda out of the race to become the Snake.; He first takes John out, but he goes back because he has an advantage.; Alyssa finds the Mongoose and takes Brett out of the race to become the Snake.; MacLaine finds the Mongoose and takes Kethryn out of the race to become the Snake.; Alyssa finds the Mongoose and takes Jack out of the race to become the Snake.; Jordan finds the Mongoose and takes MacLaine out of the race to become the Snake.; Alyssa finds the Mongoose and takes Jordan out of the race to become the Snake.; John finds the Mongoose and takes Derek out of the race to become the Snake.; John finds the Mongoose and takes Alyssa out of the race to become the Snake.; John finds the Mongoose and takes Frank out of the race to become the Snake.; Mongoose Challenge Winner/Snake: John Saving Ceremony: John saves Alyssa; Alyssa saves Frank; Frank saves Amanda; Amanda saves Derek; Derek saves Brett; Corba Cane saves Jordan; Brett saves Jack; John saves MacLaine; Cobra Cane Challenge: MacLaine: Goes back to the pit after her cane is shorter than Jordan's.; Jordan: Longest Cane; Jack: Goes back to the pit after his cane is shorter than Jordan's.; Kethryn: Goes back to the pit after her cane is shorter than Jordan's.; Eliminated: Kethryn
8	"Secret Snake"	August 12, 2025	SNK-108	0.67	0.1
Episode 8 Results: Advantage/Disadvantage: Jordan (Advantage) (by Kethryn) Swamp Challenge Winner/Secret Snake: Jack Saving Ceremony: Jack saves MacLaine; MacLaine saves Brett; Brett saves Derek; Derek saves Amanda; Amanda saves Jordan; Jordan saves Alyssa; Jack saves Frank; Eliminated: John
9	"Shocking Behavior"	August 19, 2025	SNK-109	0.79	0.1
Episode 9 Results: Advantage/Disadvantage: Frank (Advantage) (by John) Zap Challenge: MacLaine zaps Derek (Derek guesses right and MacLaine is out); Derek zaps Jack (Jack guesses wrong (says it's Alyssa) and is out); Brett zaps Amanda (Amanda guesses wrong (says it's Alyssa) and is out); Jordan zaps Derek (Derek guesses wrong (says it's Alyssa) and is out); Alyssa zaps Brett (Brett guesses right and Alyssa is out); Zap Challenge Winners/Two-Headed Snake: Brett & Jordan Saving Ceremony: Brett & Jordan save Frank; Frank saves Derek; Derek saves Jack; Brett & Jordan save Alyssa; Eliminated: Amanda & MacLaine
10	"The Final Bite"	August 26, 2025	SNK-110	0.84	0.1
Episode 10 Results: Snake Eyes Challenge: Round 1; Alyssa: No Snake Eyes; Frank: No Snake Eyes; Jordan: No Snake Eyes; Brett: No Snake Eyes; Jack: No Snake Eyes; Derek: No Snake Eyes; Round 2; Alyssa: No Snake Eyes; Frank: 1 Snake Eye; Jordan: No Snake Eyes; Brett: 2 Snake Eyes (SAFE) (WINNER); Jack: No Snake Eyes; Derek: No Snake Eyes; Round 3; Alyssa: No Snake Eyes; Frank: 2 Snake Eyes (SAFE); Jordan: 2 Snake Eyes (SAFE); Round 4; Jack: 1 Snake Eye; Derek: No Snake Eyes; Round 5; Alyssa: 2 Snake Eyes (SAFE); Jack: 1 Snake Eye; 2 Snake Eyes (SAFE); Derek: 1 Snake Eye; Crate Challenge Winner: Frank Former Snakes: Kethryn; Derek; Jacob; Jordan; MacLaine; John; Jack; Alyssa; Saving Ceremony: Brett & Frank site Kethryn out; Brett sits Alyssa out; Frank sits Jack out; Brett sits Jacob out; Frank sits Derek out; Brett sits Jordan out and picks John; Frank sits MacLaine out; John chooses Frank as the Snake.; Eliminated: Derek (Snake Eyes Challenge); Alyssa, Jordan & Jack (Crate Challenge); Brett (Saving Ceremony - Runner-Up); Snake: (chosen by John): Frank
