= Gordon Ramsay's Secret Service =

2025 American reality television series

- Genre: Reality television
- Directed by: Paul Newton
- Presented by: Gordon Ramsay
- Country of origin: United States
- Original language: English
- No. of seasons: 1
- No. of episodes: 14

Production
- Executive producers: Gordon Ramsay; Bill Langworthy
- Production companies: Fox Alternative Entertainment; Studio Ramsay Global

Original release
- Network: Fox
- Release: May 21, 2025 – present

Gordon Ramsay's Secret Service is an American reality television series that premiered on Fox on May 21, 2025. Secret Service is Ramsay's seventh reality show on the network.

The series follows Ramsay as he transforms a restaurant after covertly observing its operations. Information about the restaurant is given to Ramsay by an "insider" working at the establishment, providing Ramsay with the opportunity to investigate using black light after hours without the presence of staff. The identity of the "insider" remains a mystery to both the rest of the staff and the audience before it is revealed near the end of the episode.

Restaurants featured on the program initially believe they are being filmed as part of renovation show called Restaurant Refresh prior to Gordon Ramsay revealing the true nature of the program. The series was also initially promoted under this name before its true nature was revealed to the public.

On May 11, 2026, the series was renewed for a second season.

== Episodes ==
No.	Title	Location	Original release date	Prod. code	U.S. viewers (millions)	Rating (18–49)
1	"Parthenon"	Washington, District of Columbia	May 21, 2025	GSS-103	1.10	0.2
2	"Caffe Boa"	Phoenix, Arizona	May 28, 2025	GSS-101	1.28	0.2
3	"Mrs. White's Golden Rule Café"	Phoenix, Arizona	June 4, 2025	GSS-102	1.36	0.2
4	"MacGregor's"	Havre De Grace, Maryland	June 11, 2025	GSS-105	1.21	0.2
5	"Marvel Ranch"	Reading, Pennsylvania	June 18, 2025	GSS-106	1.36	0.2
6	"Wilson's Secret Sauce"	Upper Darby Township, Pennsylvania	June 25, 2025	GSS-107	1.36	0.2
7	"Callahan's Part One"	Frederick, Maryland	July 9, 2025	GSS-104	1.37	0.2
8	"Callahan's Part Two"	Frederick, Maryland	July 16, 2025	GSS-114	1.41	0.3
9	"Pretty Girls Cook"	Philadelphia, Pennsylvania	July 30, 2025	GSS-108	1.25	0.2
10	"Brunos"	Philadelphia, Pennsylvania	August 6, 2025	GSS-110	1.26	0.2
11	"Dahlak"	Philadelphia, Pennsylvania	August 13, 2025	GSS-109	1.15	0.2
12	"Savin"	Dorchester, Massachusetts	August 20, 2025	GSS-111	1.22	0.2
13	"Neighborhood Kitchen"	Whitinsville, Massachusetts	August 27, 2025	GSS-112	1.27	0.2
14	"Crazy Burger"	Narragansett, Rhode Island	September 10, 2025	GSS-113	1.18	0.2

== International versions ==
A Spanish remake hosted by Alberto Chicote is scheduled to premiere on LaSexta on 23 April 2026.
