= The Wranglers (TV series) =

2024 television documentary series

- Genre: Docuseries
- Country of origin: United States
- Original language: English
- No. of seasons: 1
- No. of episodes: 8

Production
- Executive producers: Matt Sharp; Dan Adler; Amy Bonezzi; Becca Gullion; Dan Morando; Nina Giannelli; Josh Wade
- Production company: Sharp Entertainment

Original release
- Network: The CW (episodes 1–3); The CW App (episodes 4–8)
- Release: October 14 – October 29, 2024

The Wranglers is an American television docuseries that premiered on October 14, 2024, on The CW. It documents the lives of staff at Montana's Circle Bar Dude ranch.

== Production ==
In October 2024, The CW cancelled The Wranglers after one season.

== Episodes ==
=== Special (2024) ===
Title	Original release date	Prod. code	U.S. viewers (millions)	Rating (18–49)
"Sneak Preview: Welcome to Circle Bar"	September 23, 2024	100	0.13	0.0

=== Season 1 ===
No.	Title	Original release date	Prod. code	U.S. viewers (millions)	Rating (18–49)
1	"Welcome to Circle Bar"	October 14, 2024	101	0.17	0.0
2	"You're A Sinner"	October 21, 2024	102	0.18	0.0
3	"Studs and Duds"	October 28, 2024	103	0.16	0.0
4	"Lockin' Horns"	October 29, 2024	104	N/A	N/A
5	"Makeouts And Makeovers"	October 29, 2024	105	N/A	N/A
6	"Mending Fences"	October 29, 2024	106	N/A	N/A
7	"Bridal Waves"	October 29, 2024	107	N/A	N/A
8	"Happy Trails"	October 29, 2024	108	N/A	N/A
