= John Bauters =

American politician

John J. Bauters

Councilmember of Emeryville
- In office 2016–2024
- Preceded by: Nora Davis

Mayor of Emeryville
- In office 2017–2018
- Preceded by: Scott Donahue
- Succeeded by: Alexandra Medina
- In office 2021–2023
- Preceded by: Dianne Martinez
- Succeeded by: Courtney Welch

Personal details
- Party: Democratic
- Education: University of Notre Dame (BA); Boston College (JD)

John J. Bauters is an American politician, attorney, and nonprofit policy director. He was a City Council Member for the City of Emeryville, California between 2016 and 2024. From 2017 to 2018, and again from 2021 to 2023, he served as mayor.

== Early life and education ==
Bauters was born in South Bend, Indiana and spent most of his childhood between there and Grand Rapids, Michigan. He earned his B.A. in Government & International Studies and Developmental Psychology from the University of Notre Dame and his J.D. from Boston College Law School.

== Career ==
Before his political career, Bauters was disaster relief director, a public policy advocate, and a legal aid attorney.

Bauters political career did not begin until after he moved to Emeryville in 2012 from Chicago. Having spent many years working in the housing advocacy space, Bauters was appointed to the Emeryville Planning Commission, where he was outspoken on the issues of housing affordability, abundance, and protections. Bauters experienced housing insecurity as a young adult, including time in a boarding home as his access to safe housing. In 2014, Bauters was instrumental in crafting the State of California's CalWORKs Housing Support Program for homeless and at-risk families in the state's welfare-to-work job training and placement program. He received the Community Champion Award from the County Welfare Directors Association of California in 2014 for his work to bring housing interventions to thousands of vulnerable low-income families.

When Bauters ran for Emeryville City Council in 2016, he committed to addressing housing affordability. The City of Emeryville uses a council–city manager system, so its council is the main legislative body. Every year, the Council selects one member to serve as Mayor and Vice Mayor for a one-year term. In 2018, while Mayor, Bauters championed Emeryville Measure C, a $50 million affordable housing bond to leverage state and federal funds and build hundreds of new homes for low-income families and fight displacement. Measure C was overwhelmingly approved by Emeryville voters on March 8, 2018, and to date is the largest per capita affordable housing bond in the state's history.

From 2017 to 2018, and again from 2021 to 2023, Bauters held the position of Emeryville Mayor. He was the first Emeryville City Council Member to serve two consecutive mayoral terms since Ken Bukowski was selected to serve in both 1997 and 1998. As Mayor and member of the Council, Bauters was instrumental in the city's budgetary processes, serving as chair of the city's Budget Committee for all eight years in office.

In 2021, under a new state program, Emeryville sought a "pro-housing city" designation that would allow the City greater access to state housing funds. As Mayor, Bauters pushed for the approval of an intergenerational housing project, successfully purchased properties out of bankruptcy and converted them into homeless housing, and helped Emeryville become one of the only Bay Area cities to meet housing production goals. Bauters was known for hosting multiple town halls each month to discuss housing developments, environmental, and transportation projects with constituents. On social media, Bauters was critical of neighboring cities in the Bay Area that routinely denied or blocked new housing projects.

In April 2023, Bauters was one of nine U.S. mayors named to the inaugural cohort of The Mayors Institute on Pedestrian Safety, which partnered with AARP and Smart Growth America to advance safe streets policy nationally. Emeryville, the city which Bauters represents, has the smallest population of any city represented by the Mayors Institute on Pedestrian Safety. Milwaukee Mayor Cavalier Johnson praised the addition of Bauters to the cohort. The Mayors meet monthly to discuss solutions to pedestrian safety hazards in US cities.

In September 2023, Bauters visited Ann Arbor, Michigan, for a bike ride where residents were invited to join in a social community ride. A few days later, Bauters spoke as a guest at the Ann Arbor mobility summit, along with Christopher Taylor. Bauters does these rides regularly, and has drawn crowds of up to 750 riders where he talks with community members about "people-oriented infrastructure and community safety" and how to communicate effectively with government officials and leaders to effectuate change.

Bauters regularly lobbied USDOT for funds to improve biking, walking, and bussing conditions in Alameda County, including projects in Emeryville. The 40th Street Multimodal Project, which some local business owners have opposed, would replace a parking and travel lane on 40th Street in Emeryville with a two-directional protected cycle track, bus-only transit lanes, and improved pedestrian features to the area. City council ultimately approved the project 4–1. In February 2025, the Metropolitan Transportation Commission voted to award Emeryville the funding to complete the project, moving the project forward to the construction phase.

Bauters is known by many people as America's Bike Mayor, a title he earned for his national advocacy on creating safe, people-oriented cities with equitable and safe mobility choice. He was the first sitting US Mayor to ever do an interview with the nationally recognized War on Cars podcast, where he discussed the value of political will. In 2023 he was named one of the 50 Most Influential People on American Cycling by the Escape Collective. This YouTube video shows highlights of affordable housing and bike paths in Emeryville, in a video tour narrated by John Bauters.

In December 2023, Bauters nominated Vice Mayor Courtney Welch to succeed him as Mayor of Emeryville. Bauters served his final year on the City Council as a Council Member before his term expired and he left office in December 2024.

== Advocacy ==
In addition to being an Emeryville Council Member, Bauters was selected to serve many regional roles for different political and social organizations and committees. He was a Board Director for the California Association of Councils of Governments from 2019-2024, served as Board Chair of the Alameda County Lead Poisoning Prevention Program from 2016-2024, the longest tenured Board Chair for the nation's oldest lead poisoning prevention and abatement agency, served for six years as the Alameda County Conference of Mayors' representative to the Bay Area Air Quality Management District Board of Directors, where he was elected Board Chair in 2022 and 2023. Bauters championed some of the most meaningful air pollution reforms in recent Bay Area history, including amendments to Rule 6-5, the nation's most stringent emissions reduction standard on fluidized catalytic cracking units and championing the nation's first zero-NOx emissions standard for household appliances, an effort that earned him the SF Bay Chapter of the Sierra Club's inaugural Visionary Award in 2022. Perhaps most importantly, Bauters represented Emeryville on the Alameda County Transportation Commission for all eight years he was in office, and was elected Chair of the Commission in 2022, 2023, and 2024, where he successfully passed the county's first Race and Equity Action Plan and first Countywide Bikeways Plan, a plan for a 400-mile network of connected safe bike routes throughout Alameda County. Bauters work impacted other communities as he organized and led other advocates and local politicians to bring attention to the importance of safe modality choice in American cities.

Bauters has been a vocal advocate for environmental justice and conservationism. He is an elected member of the San Francisco Bay Chapter of the Sierra Club's Executive Committee where he serves as Vice Chair of the Board.

== Electoral history ==
=== Emeryville City Council ===
Bauters was first elected to the Emeryville City Council in 2016; he was one of six candidates competing for three available seats that year. Emeryville residents elect five City Council Members to four-year terms. City Council elections are held in alternating even-numbered years, with three members being elected in one election and two members elected in the following election. Every year, Emeryville's City Council selects a Mayor and Vice Mayor from the Council. In 2020, nobody filed to run against Bauters during his re-election bid, and he won a second term uncontested.

2016 Emeryville City Council Election
Candidate	General election	
Candidate	Votes	%
John J. Bauters	2,312	22.68
Ally Medina	2,121	20.81
Christian Patz	1,743	16.90
Louise Engel	1,389	13.63
Brynnda Collins	1,384	13.58
Jon Van Geffen	1,247	12.23
Write-ins	18	0.18

=== Alameda County Board of Supervisors ===
Bauters was a candidate in the 2024 Alameda County Board of Supervisors 5th district election. After Bauters advanced through the primary, Oakland City Council member Nikki Fortunato Bas narrowly defeated him in the general election.

== Personal life ==
Bauters identifies openly as a gay man. Bauters was the only openly LGBTQ Mayor in Alameda County during his tenure in office and one of only a few gay mayors in California. He is known to be an animal lover, bicyclist, and outdoors enthusiast. Bauters was featured as a contestant on the reality show The Snake in 2025.
