= Yes, Chef! =

American cooking competition television series

- Genre: Reality competition
- Directed by: Harbinder Singh
- Presented by: José Andrés; Martha Stewart
- Country of origin: United States
- Original language: English
- No. of seasons: 1
- No. of episodes: 10

Production
- Executive producers: Casey Kriley; Jo Sharon; Jimmy Fox; Kevin Lee; Doneen Arquines; Paul Storck; Richard Wolffe; José Andrés; Martha Stewart
- Production companies: Magical Elves Productions; Religion of Sports; Main Event Media; Jose Andres Media

Original release
- Network: NBC
- Release: April 28 – June 30, 2025

Yes, Chef! is an American reality competition cooking show television series that aired on NBC from April 28 to June 30, 2025. The series is hosted by José Andrés and Martha Stewart. In March 2026, the series was cancelled after one season.

== Production ==
On February 13, 2025, it was announced that NBC had ordered the series with José Andrés and Martha Stewart as the hosts and executive producers.

On April 3, 2025, the chefs were announced. On March 12, 2026, it was announced that the series was cancelled after one season.

== Format ==
Contestants on Yes, Chef! are professional chefs that have been nominated by their supervisors, peers, or family members because of their inability to control the personal issues interfering with their performance in the kitchen (egotism, stubbornness, indecisiveness, etc.), despite their culinary potential. Hosts Andrés and Stewart guide these chefs through a series of challenges designed to test both their cooking skills and their behavior. The ultimate winner receives a cash prize of US$250,000.

Each episode (with the exception of the finale) features two challenges:

Main Culinary Challenge: Early in the season, the Culinary Challenges were team exercises designed to test the chefs' leadership, cooperation, and technique. The judges select the winning team and one chef from either team will be crowned that episode’s Most Valuable Chef (MVC), who receives immunity from elimination. Later episodes feature individual Culinary Challenges, with the winning chef of each challenge receiving the MVC title.

Cook-off: Initially a head-to-head challenge between the MVC and a member of the losing team (chosen by the MVC); if the MVC wins the cook-off, the nominee is eliminated from the competition, but a victory by the nominee allows that chef to select another chef from the losing team to be eliminated. In later episodes, the MVC is exempt from the cook-off and is asked to select which two chefs will compete, sometimes choosing which ingredients or restrictions the at-risk chefs receive; the loser of the cook-off leaves the competition.

== Chefs ==
Contestant	Age	Occupation	Hometown/Home country	Result
Torrece 'Chef T' Gregoire	41	Chef-owner of restaurant, Union 41	Bristol, Virginia	Eliminated May 5
Michelle Francis	TBA	Sous-chef at Jar restaurant	Santa Monica, California	Eliminated May 12
Katsuji Tanabe	44	Restaurateur	Raleigh, North Carolina	Withdrew May 26
Peter Richardson	23	Private Chef	Islip Terrace, New York	Eliminated May 26
Ronny Miranda	42	Conference Lead Chef at the Culinary Institute of America	Oakland, California	Eliminated June 2
Christopher Morales	30s	Executive Chef at Gregory's Steakhouse	Melbourne, Florida	Eliminated June 2
Julia Chebotar	36	Private Chef	New York City, New York	Eliminated May 19
Julia Chebotar	36	Private Chef	New York City, New York	Returned to Competition
Julia Chebotar	36	Private Chef	New York City, New York	Re-eliminated June 9
Petrina Peart	39	Executive Chef for the Wyoming Governor's Mansion	Cheyenne, Wyoming	Eliminated April 28
Petrina Peart	39	Executive Chef for the Wyoming Governor's Mansion	Cheyenne, Wyoming	Returned to Competition
Petrina Peart	39	Executive Chef for the Wyoming Governor's Mansion	Cheyenne, Wyoming	Re-eliminated June 16
Jake Lawler	TBA	Executive Chef at Vintage Brewing Co.	Madison, Wisconsin	Eliminated June 23
Lee Frank	46	Executive Chef at Otis restaurant	South Berwick, Maine	Runner-up June 30
Zain Ismail	28	Executive Sous Chef at Fork n' Film	Los Angeles, California	Runner-up June 30
Emily Brubaker	44	Resort executive chef at Omni La Costa	Carlsbad, California	Winner June 30

== Elimination table ==
Place	Color Team	Contestant	Episodes									
Place	Color Team	Contestant	1	2	3	4	5	6	7	8	9	10
1	Red (Episodes 1 & 4); Blue (Episodes 2 & 3); Green (Episodes 6 & 7)	Emily	WIN	WIN	LOST	SAFE	SAFE	LOST	WIN	LOST	WIN	WINNER
2	Blue (Episodes 1–3, 7); Red (Episode 4); Green (Episode 6)	Lee	SAFE	LOST	WIN	SAFE	SAFE	SAFE	LOST	WIN	WIN	RUNNER-UP
2	Green (Episodes 1–4, 6 & 7)	Zain (Note: Leader of Green Team in Episodes 1 & 3)	SAFE	WIN	WIN	LOST	SAFE	SAFE	SAFE	WIN	WIN	RUNNER-UP
4	Blue (Episodes 1, 3 & 7); Green (Episodes 2 & 6); Red (Episode 4)	Jake (Note: Leader of Red Team in Episode 4)	SAFE	WIN	WIN	SAFE	WIN	SAFE	WIN	LOST	OUT	
5	Green (Episode 1); Blue (Episodes 6 & 7)	Petrina (Note: Leader of Green Team in Episode 7)	OUT					WIN	SAFE	OUT		
6	Green (Episodes 1–4); Blue (Episodes 6 & 7)	Julia (Note: Leader of Green Team in Episode 4) (Note: Leader of Blue Team in Episode 7)	SAFE	WIN	WIN	OUT		WIN	OUT			
7	Red (Episode 1); Blue (Episodes 2 & 4); Green (Episodes 3 & 6)	Christopher	WIN	LOST	WIN	WIN	SAFE	OUT				
8	Red (Episode 1); Blue (Episodes 2 & 3) (Note: Didn't compete in Episode 2); Green (Episodes 4 & 6)	Ronny (Note: Leader of Blue Team in Episode 3)	WIN	SAFE	SAFE	LOST	WIN	OUT				
9	Blue (Episodes 1, 4 & 6); Green (Episodes 2 & 3)	Peter (Note: Leader of Blue Team in Episode 4)	SAFE	WIN	LOST	WIN	OUT	LOST				
10	Blue (Episodes 1 & 4); Green (Episodes 2 & 3)	Katsuji (Note: Leader of Blue Team in Episode 1) (Note: Leader of Green Team in Episode 2)	SAFE	WIN	LOST	WIN	WD					
11	Red (Episode 1); Blue (Episodes 2, 3 & 6)	Michelle (Note: Leader of Red Team in Episode 1) (Note: Leader of Blue Team in Episode 2)	WIN	SAFE	OUT			LOST				
12	Green (Episode 1); Blue (Episodes 2 & 6)	Torrece 'Chef T'	SAFE	OUT				LOST				

- This cook won the competition.
- This cook finished as a runner-up in the finals.
- This cook won the challenge.
- This cook was safe from elimination.
- This cook lost the challenge.
- This cook was eliminated.
- This cook won the elimination challenge.
- This cook won Most Valuable Chef of the episode.
- The contestant withdrew from the competition.

== Episodes ==
No.	Title	Original release date	U.S. viewers (millions)	Rating/share (18-49)
1	"Control Freaks"	April 28, 2025	1.51	0.1/2
2	"Martha's Roast"	May 5, 2025	1.50	0.2/2
3	"What's in the Box?"	May 12, 2025	1.40	0.1/2
4	"Taste of Your Own Medicine"	May 19, 2025	1.89	0.2/3
5	"Chefs Rank"	May 26, 2025	1.44	0.1/2
6	"Sweet Revenge"	June 2, 2025	1.28	0.1/2
7	"Knowing Your Limit"	June 9, 2025	1.35	0.1/2
8	"The Pursuit of Perfection"	June 16, 2025	1.27	0.1/2
9	"Overcoming Obstacles"	June 23, 2025	1.34	0.1/2
10	"And the Winner Is..."	June 30, 2025	1.37	0.1/3
