= Survival Mode (TV series) =

American documentary television series

- Genre: Docuseries
- Country of origin: United States
- Original language: English
- No. of seasons: 1
- No. of episodes: 9

Production
- Executive producers: Chris Cassel; Liz Cole; Elizabeth Fischer; Andy Berg; Molly O'Brien
- Production company: NBC News Studios

Original release
- Network: NBC
- Release: July 7, 2025 – present

Survival Mode is an American docuseries that premiered on NBC on July 7, 2025.

== Episodes ==
No.	Title	Original release date	Prod. code	U.S. viewers (millions)	Rating/share (18-49)
1	"Joplin Tornado"	July 7, 2025	103	1.56	0.2/3
2	"Maui Wildfires"	July 14, 2025	102	1.43	0.1/2
3	"Hurricane Ian"	July 21, 2025	101	1.64	0.1/3
4	"The Derailment of Amtrak 501"	July 28, 2025	104	1.73	0.2/3
5	"Montecito Mudslide"	August 4, 2025	105	1.65	0.1/2
6	"Fort Worth Pileup"	August 11, 2025	106	1.62	0.1/2
7	"Kentucky Floods"	August 18, 2025	107	1.70	0.1/2
8	"Superstorm Sandy"	August 25, 2025	108	1.82	0.2/3
9	"The Sinking of Costa Concordia"	September 1, 2025	109	1.58	0.1/3
