= Songs & Stories with Kelly Clarkson =

American reality television series

- Genre: Reality television
- Based on: The Kelly Clarkson Show
- Written by: Jordan Watland
- Presented by: Kelly Clarkson
- Country of origin: United States
- Original language: English
- No. of seasons: 1
- No. of episodes: 4

Production
- Executive producers: Alex Duda; Kareen Gunning; Kelly Clarkson
- Production company: Universal Television

Original release
- Network: NBC
- Release: August 19 – September 9, 2025

Related
- The Kelly Clarkson Show

Songs & Stories with Kelly Clarkson is an American reality television series, based on a segment of The Kelly Clarkson Show, that premiered on NBC on August 19, 2025. It is hosted by Kelly Clarkson.

== Production ==
On May 14, 2025, NBC announced that they had green-lit a four-episode special, Songs & Stories with Kelly Clarkson based on a segment from her talk show.

== Format ==
Clarkson sits down with her guests, where they talk about the background of some of their songs, and then they sing a portion of it. Sometimes they cover a song; for instance, during the Gloria Estefan episode, they performed "(You Make Me Feel Like) A Natural Woman".

== Episodes ==
No.	Title	Original release date	Prod. code	U.S. viewers (millions)	Rating/share (18-49)
1	"Jonas Brothers"	August 19, 2025	101	2.21	0.2/3
Songs performed in this episode: "Year 3000", "When You Look Me in the Eyes", "Stayin' Alive" (originally by Bee Gees), "Leave Before You Love Me", "Little Bird", "Love Me to Heaven", "Sucker"
2	"Gloria Estefan"	August 26, 2025	102	1.99	0.1/2
Songs performed in this episode: "Get On Your Feet", "Turn the Beat Around", "Coming Out of the Dark", "Mi Tierra", "(You Make Me Feel Like) A Natural Woman" (originally by Aretha Franklin), "Conga"
3	"Teddy Swims"	September 2, 2025	103	1.95	0.2/3
Songs performed in this episode: "Rock with You" (originally by Michael Jackson), "I Can't Make You Love Me" (originally by Bonnie Raitt), "Need You Now" (originally by Lady A), "Some Things I'll Never Know", "She Loves the Rain", "God Went Crazy", "The Door"
4	"Lizzo"	September 9, 2025	104	1.83	0.2/3
Songs performed in this episode: "Juice", "Good as Hell", "About Damn Time", "Someone like You" (originally by Adele), "Bitch", "Don't Make Me Love You", "Still Bad"

== Reception ==
=== Season 1 ===
Viewership and ratings per episode of Songs & Stories with Kelly Clarkson
No.	Title	Air date	Timeslot (ET)	Rating (18–49)	Viewers (millions)	DVR (18–49)	DVR viewers (millions)	Total (18–49)	Total viewers (millions)
1	"Jonas Brothers"	August 19, 2025	Tuesday 10:00 p.m.	0.2/3	TBD	TBD	TBD	TBD	2.21
2	"Gloria Estefan"	August 26, 2025	Tuesday 10:00 p.m.	0.1/2	TBD	TBD	TBD	TBD	1.99
3	"Teddy Swims"	September 2, 2025	Tuesday 10:00 p.m.	0.2/3	TBD	TBD	TBD	TBD	1.95
4	"Lizzo"	September 9, 2025	Tuesday 10:00 p.m.	0.2/3	TBD	TBD	TBD	TBD	1.83
