= Farmer Wants a Wife (American TV series) season 3 =

Farmer Wants a Wife
- Season 3
- Promotional poster
- Starring: Colton Hendricks; Jay Woods; John Sansone; Matt Warren
- Presented by: Kimberly Williams-Paisley
- No. of contestants: 36
- No. of episodes: 11

Release
- Original network: Fox
- Original release: March 20 – May 22, 2025

Season chronology
- ← Previous; Season 2 Next → Season 4

The third season of the Farmer Wants a Wife reboot premiered on March 20, 2025, with actress Kimberly Williams-Paisley replacing Jennifer Nettles as host. It features four farmers courting eight women each.

== Production ==
=== Filming and development ===
In December 2024, it was announced Fox renewed the series for a third season, which filmed at an unknown date.

Country singer and Williams-Paisley's husband Brad Paisley; and previous farmers Mitchell Kolinsky & Nathan Smothers, as well as their ladies Sydney Errera & Taylor Bedell, respectively, made guest appearances this season.

== Farmers ==
The four farmers searching for love were revealed on January 17, 2025.

Farmer	Age	Location	Profession
Colton Hendricks	28	Mena, Arkansas	Cattle Rancher & Horse Trainer
Jay Woods	25	Florence, Alabama	Hay & Cattle Farmer
John Sansone	25	St. Louis, Missouri	Soy, Corn & Wheat Farmer
Matt Warren	30	Morro Bay, California	Avocado & Exotic Fruit Farmer

== Contestants ==
The 32 women searching for love were announced on February 14, 2025. Four new women, chosen by each of the farmers' mothers, were introduced on April 24, 2025.

=== Colton's Women ===
Name	Age	Hometown	Occupation	Outcome	Place	Ref
Zoe Green	22	Cape Coral, Florida	ICU Nurse	Winner	1	
Keeley Goldberg	22	Hamilton, Ohio	Dance Coach	Runner-Up	2	
Bailee Wallace	24	Castle Rock, Washington	Barista	Episode 8	3 (quit)	
Hope Benefiel	24	Purcell, Oklahoma	Hairstylist	Episode 7	4	
Kate Aman	29	Franklin, Tennessee	HR Program Manager	Episode 6	5	(Note: Aman was invited to meet with Colton in episode 6. In the same episode, Colton decided not to bring her to the farm.)
Taylar McVaugh	26	Bradenton, Florida	Hairstylist	Episode 3	6	
Kassandra Clift	25	Hartsville, Tennessee	Radiology Tech	Episode 1	7-9	
Makenzie	22	Fort Worth, Texas	Hairstylist	Episode 1	7-9	
Rebecca Fox	30	Coopertown, Tennessee	Media Account Executive	Episode 1	7-9	

=== Jay's Women ===
Name	Age	Hometown	Occupation	Outcome	Place	Ref
Grace Clark	23	Ellensburg, Washington	Nanny	Winner	1	
Karina Sabol	23	Middleton, Wisconsin	Operations Manager	Runner-Up	2	
Rissa Ait Ouhanni	26	Lake Elsinore, California	Marketing	Episode 8	3	(Note: Ait Ouhanni was invited to meet with Jay in episode 6. In the same episode, she came to the farm for the first time.)
T'yana Nolen	23	Wooster, Ohio	Nurse	Episode 6	4 (quit)	
Julia Mya	22	Malibu, California	Model/Student	Episode 6	5	
Viviane-Lee	24	Los Angeles, California	Zoo Employee	Episode 4	6	
Jackie Brougham	24	San Marino, California	Nanny	Episode 1	7-9	
Kailee	26	California, Kentucky	Electronic Specialist	Episode 1	7-9	
Natalie Holland	22	Colorado Springs, Colorado	Accounting Technician	Episode 1	7-9	

=== John's Women ===
Name	Age	Hometown	Occupation	Outcome	Place	Ref
Claire Dirette	24	Portage, Michigan	Medical Sales Representative	Winner	1	
Lily Ayres	23	Overland Park, Kansas	Sales Manager	Runner-Up	2	
Juliana McDonald	27	Carlsbad, California	Private Chef	Episode 8	3 (quit)	(Note: McDonald was invited to meet with John in episode 6. In the same episode, she came to the farm for the first time.)
Kaylee Hane	25	Katy, Texas	Nurse	Episode 7	4 (quit)	
Samantha Riehl	24	Placentia, California	Sales	Episode 5	5 (quit)	
Chloe Mehring	24	Mebane, North Carolina	Private Nanny	Episode 3	6	
Abby McCowan	26	Charleston, South Carolina	Speech Language Pathologist	Episode 1	7-9	
Lindsey Davis	25	Kailua, Hawaii	Pharmaceuticals	Episode 1	7-9	
Taylor Land	23	Ruskin, Florida	Criminal Defense Paralegal	Episode 1	7-9	

=== Matt's Women ===
Name	Age	Hometown	Occupation	Outcome	Place	Ref
Chelsi Davis	29	Richardson, Texas	Jewelry Production	Winner	1	
Jordyn Belcher	32	Okolona, Mississippi	Musician	Runner-Up	2	
Halleh Day	29	Albuquerque, New Mexico	Real Estate	Episode 8	3	
Alexandra Webb	29	Encinitas, California	Nurse	Episode 7	4	
Amanda Comperry	32	Clarksville, Tennessee	Therapeutic Sales Representative	Episode 6	5	(Note: Comperry was invited to meet with Matt in episode 6. In the same episode, Matt decided not to bring her to the farm.)
Rachel Eve	25	Queens, New York	Lash Tech	Episode 4	6 (quit)	
Christine Masiewicz	28	Perkasie, Pennsylvania	Chief of Staff	Episode 1	7-9	
Jordan Elizabeth	33	Dallas, Texas	Medical Aesthetician	Episode 1	7-9	
Olivia Wright	25	Lakeland, Florida	Marketing	Episode 1	7-9	

== Elimination table ==
=== Colton's Women ===
Contestant	Episode										
Contestant	1	2/3 (Note: Episode 2 left off on a cliffhanger without revealing whether Colton chose to eliminate one of his ladies or not. Colton's decision to eliminate McVaugh was revealed at the start of the next episode.)		4	5	6	7	8	9	10	11
Zoe	In				Date	In			n/a	Family	Winner
Keeley	In		Date	In				Date	Family	n/a	Runner-Up
Bailee	In	Date	In					Quit			
Hope	In						Eliminated				
Kate	n/a					Eliminated					
Taylar	In	Eliminated									
Kassandra	Eliminated										
Makenzie	Eliminated										
Rebecca	Eliminated										

=== Jay's Women ===
Contestant	Episode										
Contestant	1	2	3	4	5	6	7	8	9	10	11
Grace	In	Date	In						Family	n/a	Winner
Karina	In				Date	In			n/a	Family	Runner-Up
Rissa	n/a					In		Date (Note: Ait Ouhanni was eliminated in episode 8 when Jay felt they had incompatible life goals during their date.)	Eliminated		
T'yana	In					Quit					
Julia	In		Date	In		Eliminated					
Viviane-Lee	In		Date	Eliminated							
Jackie	Eliminated										
Kailee	Eliminated										
Natalie	Eliminated										

=== John's Women ===
Contestant	Episode										
Contestant	1	2	3	4	5	6	7	8	9	10	11
Claire	In							Date	n/a	Family	Winner
Lily	In								Family	n/a	Runner-Up
Juliana	n/a					In		Quit			
Kaylee	In				Date	In	Quit				
Samantha	In	Date	In		Quit						
Chloe	In		Date (Note: Mehring was eliminated in episode 3 when John felt there was no connection between them during their date.)	Eliminated							
Abby	Eliminated										
Lindsey	Eliminated										
Taylor	Eliminated										

=== Matt's Women ===
Contestant	Episode										
Contestant	1	2	3	4	5	6	7	8	9	10	11
Chelsi	In							Date	n/a	Family	Winner
Jordyn	In	Date	In						Family	n/a	Runner-Up
Halleh	In		Date	In				Eliminated			
Alexandra	In				Date	In	Eliminated				
Amanda	n/a					Eliminated					
Rachel	In			Quit							
Christine	Eliminated										
Jordan	Eliminated										
Olivia	Eliminated										

== Episodes ==
No. overall	No. in season	Title	Original release date	Prod. code	U.S. viewers (millions)	Rating (18–49)
26	1	"DTF? Down to Farm?"	March 20, 2025	301	1.50	0.2
27	2	"We're Coming to Date Our Man"	March 27, 2025	302	1.53	0.2
28	3	"Meet the Friends"	April 3, 2025	303	1.53	0.2
29	4	"You Can't Pick All 5"	April 10, 2025	304	1.50	0.2
30	5	"I'm Gonna Miss You, Cowboy"	April 17, 2025	305	1.44	0.2
31	6	"Mamma Knows Best"	April 24, 2025	306	1.53	0.2
32	7	"Let's Go Camping"	May 1, 2025	307	1.41	0.1
33	8	"The Last Solo Dates"	May 8, 2025	308	1.46	0.2
34	9	"Meet the Families Part 1"	May 15, 2025	309	1.51	0.2
35	10	"Meet the Families Part 2"	May 22, 2025	310	1.66	0.1
36	11	"Final Decisions"	May 22, 2025	311	1.66	0.1
