= Farmer Wants a Wife (American TV series) season 4 =

Farmer Wants a Wife
- Season 4
- Promotional poster
- Starring: Braden Pridemore; Brett Maverick; Sean Cavanaugh
- Presented by: Kimberly Williams-Paisley
- No. of contestants: 30
- No. of episodes: 8

Release
- Original network: Fox
- Original release: April 21 – June 9, 2026

Season chronology
- ← Previous; Season 3

The fourth season of the Farmer Wants a Wife reboot premiered on April 21, 2026, with Kimberly Williams-Paisley returning as host. It features three farmers courting 9 women each.

== Production ==
=== Filming and development ===
In February 2026, Fox renewed the series for a fourth season, which filmed at an unknown date.

== Farmers ==
The farmers searching for love were revealed on February 11, 2026. Unlike the previous three seasons, only three farmers are featured instead of four.

Farmer	Age	Location	Profession
Braden Pridemore	26	Homer, Illinois	Fifth Generation Corn and Soybean Farmer
Brett Maverick	35	Savannah, Tennessee	Horse and Cattle Farmer
Sean Cavanaugh	22	Solvang, California	Farm-to-Table Produce Farmer

== Contestants ==
The 27 women searching for love were announced on March 12, 2026, an increase from the previous seasons' 24. Heather Martin was previously a contestant on season 23 of The Bachelor.

Three new women, chosen by each of the farmers' families, were introduced on May 5, 2026.

=== Braden's Women ===
Name	Age	Hometown	Occupation	Outcome	Place	Ref
Casey Riemer	27	Knoxville, Tennessee	Project Manager	Winner	1	
Brittney Graham	27	McMinnville, Oregon	Medical Aesthetician	Runner-Up	2	
Cameron Mackintosh	26	Adamstown, Maryland	Real Estate Agent	Episode 6	3	
Schyler Brush	26	Rushville, Illinois	Flower Farmer	Episode 5	4	(Note: Brush was invited to meet with Braden in episode 3. In episode 4, she came to the farm for the first time.)
Carsyn Hughes	25	Nashville, Tennessee	Miss Texas	Episode 4	5 (quit)	
Lauren Cannizzo	29	Hopewell Junction, New York	ICU Registered Nurse	Episode 3	6	(Note: Cannizzo had initially appeared as one of Brett's ladies. After feeling they had no connection during their introductory date, Cannizzo requested to meet Braden before selection took place, with Braden later selecting her as one of his five ladies to return to his farm.)
Ana Paula Mayorga Paniccia	26	Miami, Florida	Journalist	Episode 1	7-11	
Caroline Malloy	24	Peachtree City, Georgia	Event Coordinator	Episode 1	7-11	
Faith Vigilizzo	25	Morgan Hill, California	Real Estate	Episode 1	7-11	
Mackenzie Montiel	25	Montgomery, Alabama	Recruitment Consultant	Episode 1	7-11	
Nicolette Cerami	28	Bloomingdale, Illinois	Liquor Sale Director	Episode 1	7-11	

=== Brett's Women ===
Name	Age	Hometown	Occupation	Outcome	Place	Ref
Quinn Gutermann	26	Buhl, Idaho	Medical Aesthetician	Winner	1	
Hanna Carpenter	25	Windermere, Florida	Retail Manager	Runner-Up	2	
Sophia Blake	26	Charlotte, North Carolina	MedSpa Coordinator	Episode 6	3 (quit)	(Note: Blake was invited to meet with Brett in episode 3. In episode 4, she came to the farm for the first time.)
Stephanie Ludwig	31	Tomball, Texas	Model	Episode 4	4 (quit)	
Cassi Ahrens	29	Loma, Colorado	Medical Sales	Episode 4	5	
Heather Martin	30	Carlsbad, California	Content Creator	Episode 4	6 (quit)	
Breauna Washington	29	Avon Park, Florida	Character Performer	Episode 1	7-9	
Julia Guajardo	29	La Mirada, California	Architectural Designer	Episode 1	7-9	
Paige Palmari	32	Long Island, New York	Aesthetic Medical Sales	Episode 1	7-9	
Lauren Cannizzo	(Swapped farmers)					

=== Sean's Women ===
Name	Age	Hometown	Occupation	Outcome	Place	Ref
Emily Rushnell	25	Brooksville, Florida	Events Specialist	Winner	1	
Carson Higgins	25	Argyle, Texas	Wedding Planner	Runner-Up	2	
Olivia Brown	21	Billings, Montana	Real Estate Agent and Woodworker	Episode 6	3	
Rheanna Bissett	22	Owings, Maryland	Surgical Technician	Episode 5	4	(Note: Bissett was invited to meet with Sean in episode 3. In episode 4, she came to the farm for the first time.)
Macey Scheffler	21	Bell Buckle, Tennessee	Model	Episode 5	5 (quit)	
Alibeth Thigpen	22	LaGrange, Georgia	Hairstylist	Episode 4	6	
Autumn Ballington	24	Gilbert, South Carolina	Pilates Instructor	Episode 1	7-10	
Brooke Jackson	25	Conyers, Georgia	Behavioral Therapist	Episode 1	7-10	
Gabriela Ramos	28	Sacramento, California	Registered Dental Nurse	Episode 1	7-10	
Kamryn Kauffman	23	Lubbock, Texas	Boutique Owner	Episode 1	7-10	

== Elimination table ==
=== Braden's Women ===
Contestant	Episode							
Contestant	1	2/3 (Note: Episode 2 left off on a cliffhanger without revealing whether Braden chose to eliminate one of his ladies or not. Braden's decision to eliminate Cannizzo was revealed at the start of the next episode.)		4	5	6	7	8
Casey	In					Date	In	Winner
Brittney	In			Date	In			Runner-Up
Cameron	In					Eliminated		
Schyler	n/a		In		Eliminated			
Carsyn	In	Date	In	Quit				
Lauren	In	Eliminated						
Ana Paula	Eliminated							
Caroline	Eliminated							
Faith	Eliminated							
Mackenzie	Eliminated							
Nicolette	Eliminated							

=== Brett's Women ===
Contestant	Episode							
Contestant	1	2	3	4	5	6	7	8
Quinn	In					Date	In	Winner
Hanna	In			Date	In			Runner-Up
Sophia	n/a		In			Quit		
Stephanie	In			Quit				
Cassi	In	Date	In	Eliminated				
Heather	In			Quit				
Breauna	Eliminated							
Julia	Eliminated							
Paige	Eliminated							
Lauren	Quit							

=== Sean's Women ===
Contestant	Episode							
Contestant	1	2	3	4	5	6	7	8
Emily	In			Date	In			Winner
Carson	In					Date	In	Runner-Up
Olivia	In	Date	In			Eliminated		
Rheanna	n/a		In		Eliminated			
Macey	In				Quit			
Alibeth	In			Eliminated				
Autumn	Eliminated							
Brooke	Eliminated							
Gabriela	Eliminated							
Kamryn	Eliminated							

== Episodes ==
No. overall	No. in season	Title	Original release date	Prod. code	U.S. viewers (millions)	Rating (18–49)
37	1	"Can I Meet a Different Farmer?"	April 21, 2026	401	N/A	TBA
38	2	"Ladies Coming in Hot!"	April 28, 2026	402	N/A	TBA
39	3	"Thank God She's Not Blonde"	May 5, 2026	403	N/A	TBA
40	4	"A Kiss Changes Everything"	May 12, 2026	404	N/A	TBA
41	5	"A Rumor Rocks the Farm"	May 19, 2026	405	TBD	TBA
42	6	"'Steamy' Romantic"	May 26, 2026	406	TBD	TBA
43	7	"I'm Falling For You"	June 2, 2026	407	TBD	TBA
44	8	"Final Decisions: It's Always Been You"	June 9, 2026	408	TBD	TBA
