= Farmer Wants a Wife (American TV series) season 2 =

Farmer Wants a Wife
- Season 2
- Promotional poster
- Starring: Brandon Rogers; Mitchell Kolinsky; Nathan Smothers; Ty Ferrell
- Presented by: Jennifer Nettles
- No. of contestants: 35
- No. of episodes: 14

Release
- Original network: Fox
- Original release: February 1 – May 16, 2024

Season chronology
- ← Previous; Season 1 Next → Season 3

The second season of the Farmer Wants a Wife reboot premiered on February 1, 2024, with Jennifer Nettles returning as host. It features four farmers courting 8 women each.

== Production ==
=== Filming and development ===
In May 2023, Fox renewed the series for a second season, which filmed that fall.

== Farmers ==
The four farmers searching for love were revealed on December 14, 2023.

Farmer	Age	Location	Profession
Brandon Rogers	29	Center, Colorado	Potato and Barley Farmer
Mitchell Kolinsky	27	Mount Juliet, Tennessee	First Generation Farmer
Nathan Smothers	23	Bartow, Florida	Citrus and Cattle Farmer
Ty Ferrell	42	Sikeston, Missouri	Team Roper

=== Future appearances ===
==== The 1% Club ====
Brandon and Ty competed in season 3 of The 1% Club. Both farmers were eliminated on the 60% question.

== Contestants ==
The 32 women searching for love were announced on January 10, 2024. Three new women were introduced on March 14, 2024, while one of the previous 32 returned after departing due to a family emergency, all of whom were invited to the farms in the following episode two weeks later.

=== Brandon's Women ===
Name	Age	Hometown	Occupation	Outcome	Place	Ref
Grace Girard	25	Caledonia, Wisconsin	Communications Associate	Winner	1	
Emerson Sears	26	Elkhart, Iowa	College Counselor	Runner-Up	2	(Note: Sears was invited to meet with Brandon in episode 6. In episode 7, she came to the farm for the first time.)
Joy Mayfield	25	Jacksonville, Florida	Radiologic Tech	Episode 10	3 (quit)	
Annellyse Munroe	30	Miami, Florida	Professional Dancer	Episode 5	4 (quit)	
Reba Wood	29	Spearfish, South Dakota	Bar Supervisor	Episode 5	5 (quit)	
Brooklyn Bushnell	25	St. George, Utah	Makeup Artist	Episode 4	6	
Britt Klocko	30	Nashville, Tennessee	ER Nurse	Episode 1	7-9	
Madison Anderson	27	Los Angeles, California	Social Media Manager	Episode 1	7-9	
Tayana Harrison	28	Chambersburg, Pennsylvania	Insurance Specialist	Episode 1	7-9	

=== Mitchell's Women ===
Name	Age	Hometown	Occupation	Outcome	Place	Ref
Sydney Errera	22	Sweetwater, New Jersey	Construction Worker	Winner	1	
Kait Smith	23	Los Angeles, California	Social Media Coordinator	Runner-Up	2	
Kiana Clemente	30	Hermosa Beach, California	Dog Trainer	Episode 10	3	
Natalie	24	Austin, Texas	Regional Sales Manager	Episode 9	4	(Note: Natalie was invited to meet with Mitchell in episode 6. In episode 7, she came to the farm for the first time.)
Melanie Shaner	26	Leawood, Kansas	Bottle Service	Episode 6	5	
Brittany Dickinson	29	Thousand Oaks, California	Model	Episode 3	6	
Emily Pellistri	28	Phoenix, Arizona	Healthcare Recruiter	Episode 1	7-9	
Kandice Peterson	33	Denver, Colorado	Social Media Coordinator	Episode 1	7-9	
Rachel "Ray" Clanton	28	Miami Lakes, Florida	Photographer	Episode 1	7-9	

=== Nathan's Women ===
Name	Age	Hometown	Occupation	Outcome	Place	Ref
Taylor Bedell	25	Warrensburg, Missouri	Hairstylist	Winner	1	
Allye Wright	25	Tucson, Arizona	Digital Marketing Specialist	Runner-Up	2	
Makenzie Wayman	26	Morrow, Ohio	Registered Nurse	Episode 10	3 (quit)	
Kristin Force	25	Roseville, California	Hairstylist	Episode 8	4 (quit)	
Rachel Woods	25	Houston, Texas	Marketing & Public Relations	Episode 4	5	
Makenzie Wayman	(Returned to competition)			Episode 2	Quit (Note: Wayman left in episode 2 before her solo date could take place due to a medical emergency involving her father. She returned in episode 6 as one of the "new ladies" for the farmers and later returned to Nathan's farm in episode 7, but left again in episode 10 after learning that her father's condition had gotten worse.)	
Destiny Freeman	23	Fontana, California	Cheer Coach	Episode 1	6-8	
Kiara Jones	23	Tracy, California	Youth Development Worker	Episode 1	6-8	
Lexie Jonier	25	Waycross, Georgia	Dog Daycare Owner	Episode 1	6-8	

=== Ty's Women ===
Name	Age	Hometown	Occupation	Outcome	Place	Ref
Megan Lay	31	Nashville, Tennessee	Teacher	Episode 13	1-2	
Melody Fernandez	31	Yonkers, New York	Nurse	Episode 13	1-2	
Ashley	36	Lexington, Kentucky	Oncology PA	Episode 9	3 (quit)	(Note: Ashley was invited to meet with Ty in episode 6. In episode 7, she came to the farm for the first time.)
Brooke Wyman	37	Sarasota, Florida	Executive Assistant	Episode 8	4	
Amy Bryant	38	Haverhill, Florida	Realtor	Episode 6	5 (quit)	
Erin Sossamon	31	Georgetown, Texas	Event Planner	Episode 2	6	
Allison Hozeska	33	Holly, Michigan	Sales Rep	Episode 1	7-8	
Ashleigh Guich	34	Shingle Springs, California	Behavior Analyst	Episode 1	7-8	
Christine Cosentino	37	Laurel Hollow, New York	Real Estate Developer	Episode 1	9 (quit)	

== Elimination table ==
=== Brandon's Women ===
Contestant	Episode													
Contestant	1	2	3	4	5	6	7	8	9	10	11	12	13	14
Grace	In			Date	In						Family	In	Winner	
Emerson	n/a					In		Date	In			Family	Runner-Up	
Joy	In					Date	In			Date	Quit			
Annellyse	In				Quit									
Reba	In	Date	In		Quit									
Brooklyn	In			Eliminated										
Britt	Eliminated													
Madison	Eliminated													
Tayana	Eliminated													

=== Mitchell's Women ===
Contestant	Episode													
Contestant	1	2	3	4	5	6	7	8	9	10	11	12	13	14
Sydney	In							Date	In		Family	In	Winner	
Kait	In			Date	In							Family	Runner-Up	
Kiana	In	Date	In							Date	Eliminated			
Natalie	n/a					In			Eliminated					
Melanie	In					Date	Eliminated							
Brittany	In		Eliminated											
Emily	Eliminated													
Kandice	Eliminated													
Ray	Eliminated													

=== Nathan's Women ===
Contestant	Episode													
Contestant	1	2	3	4	5	6	7	8	9	10	11	12	13	14
Taylor	In					Date	In					Family	Winner	
Allye	In									Date	Family	In	Runner-Up	
Makenzie	In	Date	Quit			Returned	In	Date	In	Quit				
Kristin	In							Quit						
Rachel	In			Date (Note: Rachel was eliminated in episode 4 when she and Nathan agreed they had incompatible life goals during their date.)	Eliminated									
Destiny	Eliminated													
Kiara	Eliminated													
Lexie	Eliminated													

=== Ty's Women ===
Contestant	Episode													
Contestant	1	2	3	4	5	6	7	8	9	10	11	12	13	14
Megan	In					Date	In					Family	Eliminated	
Melody	In	Date	In							Date	Family	In	Eliminated	
Ashley	n/a					In		Date	Quit					
Brooke	In							Eliminated						
Amy	In			Date	In	Quit								
Erin	In	Eliminated												
Allison	Eliminated													
Ashleigh	Eliminated													
Christine	Quit													

== Episodes ==
No. overall	No. in season	Title	Original release date	Prod. code	U.S. viewers (millions)	Rating (18–49)
12	1	"Meet the New Farmers!"	February 1, 2024	201	1.99	0.3
13	2	"Welcome to the Farms"	February 8, 2024	202	1.83	0,2
14	3	"Tailgates and Tantrums"	February 15, 2024	203	1.77	0.2
15	4	"You Need to Step up Your Flirting Game"	February 22, 2024	204	1.59	0.2
16	5	"Steers, Fears and Tears"	February 29, 2024	205	1.86	0.2
17	6	"Temptation Strolls into Town"	March 14, 2024	206	1.82	0.2
18	7	"Should I Stay or Should I Go?"	March 28, 2024	207	1.70	0.2
19	8	"Someone Needs to Go Home"	April 4, 2024	208	1.81	0.2
20	9	"Farmers' Family Dinner"	April 11, 2024	209	1.73	0.2
21	10	"Final Solo Dates"	April 18, 2024	210	2.04	0.3
22	11	"Family City Visits Part 1"	April 25, 2024	211	1.81	0.2
23	12	"Family City Visits Part 2"	May 2, 2024	212	1.86	0.2
24	13	"The Final Decisions"	May 9, 2024	213	2.03	0.2
25	14	"The Reunion"	May 16, 2024	214	1.74	0.2
