= The 1% Club (American game show) =

American game show

- Genre: Game show
- Based on: The 1% Club by: Dean Nabarro; Andy Auerbach
- Directed by: Carrie Havel (season 1); Ashley S. Gorman (season 2)
- Presented by: Patton Oswalt; Joel McHale
- Theme music composer: Twin Petes
- Country of origin: United States
- Original language: English
- No. of seasons: 3
- No. of episodes: 39

Production
- Executive producers: Ryan O'Dowd; Krystal Whitney; Dean Nabarro; Andy Auerbach; Wes Kauble
- Production locations: Television City; Los Angeles, California
- Camera setup: Multi-camera
- Production companies: Amazon MGM Studios (2024); BBC Studios Los Angeles Productions; Magnum Media; Fox Entertainment (2025)

Original release
- Network: Prime Video
- Release: May 23 – September 10, 2024
- Network: Fox
- Release: June 3, 2024 – present

The 1% Club is an American game show that premiered on Amazon Prime Video on May 23, 2024. Based on the British game show, each episode features 100 contestants competing to solve skill- and logic-based puzzles of increasing difficulty, as gauged by a survey of Americans, for a chance to win a jackpot of up to $100,000.

Produced by Magnum Media and BBC Studios Los Angeles, in association with Amazon MGM Studios, the first season was hosted by comedian Patton Oswalt, with Amazon entering into an agreement with Fox to sublicense the series for broadcast television. In January 2025, The 1% Club was renewed by Fox for a second season with new host Joel McHale, which premiered in June 2025. A third season premiered in April 2026.

== Format ==
All questions used on the show are taken from a set that has been previously posed to a group of people chosen from throughout the United States. The questions are classified by the percentage who answered correctly, with lower percentages indicating higher difficulty levels. A total of 15 questions are used per episode, starting at 90% and decreasing to 1%.

The game begins with 100 contestants, each of whom is given a $1,000 stake. After a question is asked, they have 30 seconds to lock in their responses. All contestants who either answer incorrectly or fail to respond in time are eliminated, and their money is added to the day's jackpot. Prior to the fifth question (50%), all remaining contestants are given a pass, which they may use to skip any one question other than the final one (1%). In order to use a pass, however, a contestant must put their $1,000 into the jackpot. Prior to the ninth question (30%), any contestants who have not yet used their pass are given a chance to leave the game at this point and keep their money; those who have used their pass must continue. (Note: For the first episode only, this offer was made prior to the eighth question at 35%.)

All contestants who either answer the 5% question correctly or pass it become eligible to win the jackpot. They may accept equal shares of $10,000 and leave the game, or attempt the 1% question. Starting in season three, the $10,000 is divided only among the contestants who decide to leave the game (if any). The jackpot is divided equally among all contestants who attempt the question and answer it correctly. Contestants who reach the 1% question with their pass keep their $1,000 in addition to any other money they might win.

If a question ends with only one contestant still in the game, that contestant may either accept $10,000 and stop playing, or advance directly to the 1% question. If only one contestant is left at any point before the 10% question, the 10% and 5% questions will still be played but only for fun.

The maximum winnings total for a single contestant is $100,000, requiring that all the money held by the other 99 go into the jackpot due to wrong answers or passes.

Question	1	2	3	4	5	6	7	8	9	10	11	12	13	14	15
Percentage	90%	80%	70%	60%	50%	45%	40%	35%	30%	25%	20%	15%	10%	5%	1%

== Production ==
On October 17, 2023, it was announced that Amazon Prime Video had ordered the series. On March 4, 2024, Patton Oswalt was announced as host; it was also announced that Fox had entered into a sublicensing agreement to also air the series on broadcast television.

On January 23, 2025, Fox renewed the series for a second season without Amazon's involvement; Joel McHale would replace Oswalt as host. In April 2025, Fox announced that the second season would premiere on June 10, 2025. On February 17, 2026, it was announced that a third season would premiere on April 13, 2026.

== Episodes ==
=== Series overview ===
Season	Episodes	Originally released	
Season	Episodes	First released	Last released
1	13	May 23, 2024	September 10, 2024
2	14	June 10, 2025	September 16, 2025
3	12	April 13, 2026	August 17, 2026

=== Season 1 (2024) ===
No. overall	No. in season	Title	Prime Video release date	Fox air date	Prod. code	U.S. linear viewers (millions)	Rating/share (18-49)
1	1	"I Need a Villain!"	May 23, 2024	June 3, 2024	OPR-101	1.47	0.2/3
Episode 1 Results: 90% Question: Number of people who got it right: 96; Number of people who are out: 4; Prize Pot: $4,000; 80% question: Number of people who got it right: 65; Number of people who are out: 31; Prize Pot: $35,000; 70% question: Number of people who got it right: 58; Number of people who are out: 7; Prize Pot: $42,000; 60% question: Number of people who got it right: 48; Number of people who are out: 10; Prize Pot: $52,000; 50% question: Number of people who got it right: 36; Number of people who are out: 2; Number of people who passed: 10; Prize Pot: $60,000; 45% question: Number of people who got it right: 34; Number of people who are out: 6; Number of people who passed: 6; Prize Pot: $72,000; 40% question: Number of people who got it right: 32; Number of people who are out: 1; Number of people who passed: 7; Prize Pot: $79,000; 35% question: Number of people who got it right: 32; Number of people who are out: 6; Number of people who passed: 1; Prize Pot: $86,000; Number of people who left with $1,000: 1; 30% question: Number of people who got it right: 22; Number of people who are out: 9; Number of people who passed: 1; Prize Pot: $90,000; 25% question: Number of people who got it right: 17; Number of people who are out: 6; Prize Pot: $92,000; 20% question: Number of people who got it right: 12; Number of people who are out: 5; Prize Pot: $93,000; 15% question: Number of people who got it right: 10; Number of people who are out: 1; Number of people who passed: 1; Prize Pot: $95,000; 10% question: Number of people who got it right: 7; Number of people who are out: 4; Prize Pot: $98,000; 5% question: Number of people who got it right: 1; Number of people who are out: 5; Number of people who passed: 1 (Kyle); Prize Pot: $99,000; Names of the remaining contestants: Christopher, Kyle; 1% question: Contestant who won: Kyle ($99,000); Contestant who lost: Christopher
2	2	"Santa Doesn't Do Double Negatives"	June 11, 2024	June 10, 2024	OPR-106	1.68	0.3/3
Episode 2 Results: 90% Question: Number of people who got it right: 96; Number of people who are out: 4; Prize Pot: $4,000; 80% question: Number of people who got it right: 90; Number of people who are out: 6; Prize Pot: $10,000; 70% question: Number of people who got it right: 85; Number of people who are out: 5; Prize Pot: $15,000; 60% question: Number of people who got it right: 72; Number of people who are out: 13; Prize Pot: $28,000; 50% question: Number of people who got it right: 58; Number of people who are out: 12; Number of people who passed: 2; Prize Pot: $42,000; 45% question: Number of people who got it right: 43; Number of people who are out: 8; Number of people who passed: 9; Prize Pot: $59,000; 40% question: Number of people who got it right: 31; Number of people who are out: 9; Number of people who passed: 12; Prize Pot: $77,000; 35% question: Number of people who got it right: 29; Number of people who are out: 9; Number of people who passed: 5; Prize Pot: $87,000; 30% question: Number of people who got it right: 21; Number of people who are out: 7; Number of people who passed: 4; Prize Pot: $91,000; Number of people who left with $1,000: 2; 25% question: Number of people who got it right: 21; Number of people who are out: 4; Prize Pot: $92,000; 20% question: Number of people who got it right: 21; 15% question: Number of people who got it right: 8; Number of people who are out: 9; Number of people who passed: 4; 10% question: Number of people who got it right: 7; Number of people who are out: 5; Number of people who passed: 4; Prize Pot: $94,000; 5% question: Number of people who got it right: 6; Number of people who are out: 1; Number of people who passed: 2; Prize Pot: $96,000; Names of the remaining contestants: Brian, Neilan, Wes, Orion, Davis, Jeanette; 1% question: Contestants who won: Orion ($48,000), Jeanette ($49,000); Contestants who lost: Brian, Neilan ($1,000), Wes, Davis
3	3	"The Quest for the BBL"	June 18, 2024	June 17, 2024	OPR-107	1.49	0.2/2
Episode 3 Results: 90% Question: Number of people who got it right: 99; Number of people who are out: 1; Prize Pot: $1,000; 80% question: Number of people who got it right: 90; Number of people who are out: 9; Prize Pot: $10,000; 70% question: Number of people who got it right: 83; Number of people who are out: 7; Prize Pot: $17,000; 60% question: Number of people who got it right: 63; Number of people who are out: 20; Prize Pot: $37,000; 50% question: Number of people who got it right: 57; Number of people who are out: 5; Number of people who passed: 1; Prize Pot: $43,000; 45% question: Number of people who got it right: 45; Number of people who are out: 11; Number of people who passed: 2; Prize Pot: $56,000; 40% question: Number of people who got it right: 33; Number of people who are out: 8; Number of people who passed: 6; Prize Pot: $69,000; 35% question: Number of people who got it right: 26; Number of people who are out: 10; Number of people who passed: 3; Prize Pot: $79,000; 30% question: Number of people who got it right: 19; Number of people who are out: 3; Number of people who passed: 6; Prize Pot: $86,000; Number of people who left with $1,000: 1; 25% question: Number of people who got it right: 9; Number of people who are out: 10; Number of people who passed: 6; Prize Pot: $95,000; 20% question: Number of people who got it right: 15; 15% question: Number of people who got it right: 6; Number of people who are out: 7; Number of people who passed: 2; Prize Pot: $97,000; 10% question: Number of people who got it right: 3; Number of people who are out: 3; Number of people who passed: 2; Prize Pot: $99,000; 5% question: Number of people who got it right: 1; Number of people who are out: 4; Name of the remaining contestant: Dana; 1% question: Contestant who lost: Dana
4	4	"Patton with Two T's"	June 25, 2024	June 24, 2024	OPR-111	1.44	0.2/2
Episode 4 Results: 90% Question: Number of people who got it right: 92; Number of people who are out: 8; Prize Pot: $8,000; 80% question: Number of people who got it right: 66; Number of people who are out: 26; Prize Pot: $34,000; 70% question: Number of people who got it right: 59; Number of people who are out: 7; Prize Pot: $41,000; 60% question: Number of people who got it right: 57; Number of people who are out: 2; Prize Pot: $43,000; 50% question: Number of people who got it right: 47; Number of people who are out: 9; Number of people who passed: 1; Prize Pot: $53,000; 45% question: Number of people who got it right: 34; Number of people who are out: 8; Number of people who passed: 6; Prize Pot: $66,000; 40% question: Number of people who got it right: 33; Number of people who are out: 4; Number of people who passed: 3; Prize Pot: $72,000; 35% question: Number of people who got it right: 14; Number of people who are out: 7; Number of people who passed: 15; Prize Pot: $91,000; 30% question: Number of people who got it right: 26; Number of people who are out: 1; Number of people who passed: 1; Prize Pot: $92,000; Number of people who left with $1,000: 1; 25% question: Number of people who got it right: 13; Number of people who are out: 11; Number of people who passed: 3; Prize Pot: $95,000; 20% question: Number of people who got it right: 15; Number of people who passed: 1; Prize Pot: $96,000; 15% question: Number of people who got it right: 5; Number of people who are out: 10; Number of people who passed: 1; Prize Pot: $97,000; 10% question: Number of people who got it right: 3; Number of people who are out: 3; 5% question: Number of people who got it right: 3; Names of the remaining contestants: Nate, Wei-Hwa, Brett; 1% question: Contestants who won: Nate, Wei-Hwa, Brett ($32,333 each)
5	5	"When in Doubt, Pick C"	July 2, 2024	July 1, 2024	OPR-108	1.51	0.3/3
Episode 5 Results: 90% Question: Number of people who got it right: 100; 80% question: Number of people who got it right: 93; Number of people who are out: 7; Prize Pot: $7,000; 70% question: Number of people who got it right: 88; Number of people who are out: 5; Prize Pot: $12,000; 60% question: Number of people who got it right: 75; Number of people who are out: 13; Prize Pot: $25,000; 50% question: Number of people who got it right: 51; Number of people who are out: 18; Number of people who passed: 6; Prize Pot: $49,000; 45% question: Number of people who got it right: 52; Number of people who are out: 3; Number of people who passed: 2; Prize Pot: $52,000; 40% question: Number of people who got it right: 45; Number of people who are out: 6; Number of people who passed: 3; Prize Pot: $60,000; 35% question: Number of people who got it right: 44; Number of people who are out: 1; Number of people who passed: 3; Prize Pot: $63,000; 30% question: Number of people who got it right: 5; Number of people who are out: 10; Number of people who passed: 24; Prize Pot: $88,000; Number of people who left with $1,000: 8; 25% question: Number of people who got it right: 16; Number of people who are out: 12; Number of people who passed: 1; Prize Pot: $90,000; 20% question: Number of people who got it right: 7; Number of people who are out: 10; Prize Pot: $92,000; 15% question: Number of people who got it right: 4; Number of people who are out: 3; 10% question: Number of people who got it right: 4; 5% question: Number of people who got it right: 4; Names of the remaining contestants: Peter, Anna, Sean, Timothy; 1% question: Contestants who lost: Peter, Anna, Sean; Contestant who left: Timothy ($2,500)
6	6	"Tick, Tick, Money"	July 9, 2024	July 8, 2024	OPR-105	1.59	0.2/3
Episode 6 Results: 90% Question: Number of people who got it right: 94; Number of people who are out: 6; Prize Pot: $6,000; 80% question: Number of people who got it right: 91; Number of people who are out: 3; Prize Pot: $9,000; 70% question: Number of people who got it right: 89; Number of people who are out: 2; Prize Pot: $11,000; 60% question: Number of people who got it right: 83; Number of people who are out: 6; Prize Pot: $17,000; 50% question: Number of people who got it right: 67; Number of people who are out: 7; Number of people who passed: 9; Prize Pot: $33,000; 45% question: Number of people who got it right: 66; Number of people who are out: 3; Number of people who passed: 7; Prize Pot: $43,000; 40% question: Number of people who got it right: 44; Number of people who are out: 19; Number of people who passed: 10; Prize Pot: $65,000; 35% question: Number of people who got it right: 13; Number of people who are out: 21; Number of people who passed: 20; Prize Pot: $92,000; 30% question: Number of people who got it right: 29; Number of people who are out: 2; Number of people who passed: 1; Prize Pot: $93,000; Number of people who left with $1,000: 1; 25% question: Number of people who got it right: 19; Number of people who are out: 7; Number of people who passed: 4; Prize Pot: $97,000; 20% question: Number of people who got it right: 11; Number of people who are out: 12; Prize Pot: $98,000; 15% question: Number of people who got it right: 10; Number of people who are out: 1; 10% question: Number of people who got it right: 7; Number of people who are out: 3; 5% question: Number of people who got it right: 6; Number of people who are out: 1; Names of the remaining contestants: Marie, Tommy, Anthony, Mary, Jacob, Colman; 1% question: Contestants who won: Marie, Mary, Jacob, Colman ($24,500 each); Contestants who lost: Tommy, Anthony
7	7	"Reverse Psychology'd Myself"	July 16, 2024	July 15, 2024	OPR-112	1.56	0.2/2
Episode 7 Results: 90% Question: Number of people who got it right: 93; Number of people who are out: 7; Prize Pot: $7,000; 80% question: Number of people who got it right: 89; Number of people who are out: 4; Prize Pot: $11,000; 70% question: Number of people who got it right: 88; Number of people who are out: 1; Prize Pot: $12,000; 60% question: Number of people who got it right: 69; Number of people who are out: 19; Prize Pot: $31,000; 50% question: Number of people who got it right: 59; Number of people who are out: 8; Number of people who passed: 2; Prize Pot: $41,000; 45% question: Number of people who got it right: 43; Number of people who are out: 10; Number of people who passed: 8; Prize Pot: $57,000; 40% question: Number of people who got it right: 38; Number of people who are out: 10; Number of people who passed: 3; Prize Pot: $68,000; 35% question: Number of people who got it right: 31; Number of people who are out: 2; Number of people who passed: 8; Prize Pot: $76,000; 30% question: Number of people who got it right: 27; Number of people who are out: 6; Prize Pot: $80,000; Number of people who left with $1,000: 6; 25% question: Number of people who got it right: 20; Number of people who are out: 6; Number of people who passed: 1; Prize Pot: $83,000; 20% question: Number of people who got it right: 5; Number of people who are out: 7; Number of people who passed: 9; Prize Pot: $93,000; 15% question: Number of people who got it right: 11; Number of people who are out: 3; 10% question: Number of people who got it right: 7; Number of people who are out: 4; 5% question: Number of people who got it right: 1; Number of people who are out: 5; Number of people who passed: 1 (Bruce); Prize Pot: $94,000; Names of the remaining contestants: Bruce, Ariel; 1% question: Contestants who lost: Bruce, Ariel
8	8	"Your Mummified Turtle is Proud of You"	July 23, 2024	July 22, 2024	OPR-103	1.64	0.3/3
Episode 8 Results: 90% Question: Number of people who got it right: 95; Number of people who are out: 5; Prize Pot: $5,000; 80% question: Number of people who got it right: 93; Number of people who are out: 2; Prize Pot: $7,000; 70% question: Number of people who got it right: 59; Number of people who are out: 34; Prize Pot: $41,000; 60% question: Number of people who got it right: 56; Number of people who are out: 3; Prize Pot: $44,000; 50% question: Number of people who got it right: 55; Number of people who passed: 1; Prize Pot: $45,000; 45% question: Number of people who got it right: 36; Number of people who are out: 10; Number of people who passed: 10; Prize Pot: $64,000; 40% question: Number of people who got it right: 24; Number of people who are out: 14; Number of people who passed: 8; Prize Pot: $82,000; 35% question: Number of people who got it right: 32; 30% question: Number of people who got it right: 21; Number of people who are out: 7; Number of people who passed: 4; Prize Pot: $87,000; 25% question: Number of people who got it right: 22; Number of people who are out: 3; Prize Pot: $90,000; 20% question: Number of people who got it right: 15; Number of people who are out: 7; Prize Pot: $96,000; 15% question: Number of people who got it right: 4; Number of people who are out: 11; Prize Pot: $98,000; 10% question: Number of people who got it right: 3; Number of people who passed: 1 (Rain); Prize Pot: $99,000; 5% question: Number of people who got it right: 4; Names of the remaining contestants: Rain, Ian, Hiiro, Seaton; 1% question: Contestants who won: Rain, Ian ($33,000 each), Hiiro ($34,000); Contestant who left: Seaton ($2,500)
9	9	"A Lifetime Supply of Hotdogs"	August 13, 2024	August 12, 2024	OPR-109	1.70	0.2/3
Episode 9 Results: 90% Question: Number of people who got it right: 97; Number of people who are out: 3; Prize Pot: $3,000; 80% question: Number of people who got it right: 86; Number of people who are out: 11; Prize Pot: $14,000; 70% question: Number of people who got it right: 78; Number of people who are out: 8; Prize Pot: $22,000; 60% question: Number of people who got it right: 70; Number of people who are out: 8; Prize Pot: $30,000; 50% question: Number of people who got it right: 49; Number of people who are out: 17; Number of people who passed: 4; Prize Pot: $51,000; 45% question: Number of people who got it right: 32; Number of people who are out: 12; Number of people who passed: 9; Prize Pot: $71,000; 40% question: Number of people who got it right: 27; Number of people who are out: 6; Number of people who passed: 8; Prize Pot: $80,000; 35% question: Number of people who got it right: 29; Number of people who are out: 3; Number of people who passed: 3; Prize Pot: $83,000; 30% question: Number of people who got it right: 25; Number of people who are out: 4; Prize Pot: $86,000; Number of people who left with $1,000: 3; 25% question: Number of people who got it right: 19; Number of people who are out: 4; Number of people who passed: 2; Prize Pot: $89,000; 20% question: Number of people who got it right: 19; Number of people who are out: 2; 15% question: Number of people who got it right: 9; Number of people who are out: 7; Number of people who passed: 3; Prize Pot: $92,000; 10% question: Number of people who got it right: 6; Number of people who are out: 3; Number of people who passed: 3; Prize Pot: $96,000; 5% question: Number of people who got it right: 4; Number of people who are out: 4; Number of people who passed: 1 (Rachel); Prize Pot: $97,000; Names of the remaining contestants: Len, Arjun, Shawn, Rachel, Hakob; 1% question: Contestants who lost: Len, Arjun, Shawn, Rachel, Hakob
10	10	"I Heard The Goats Calling"	August 20, 2024	August 19, 2024	OPR-102	1.62	0.2/3
Episode 10 Results: 90% Question: Number of people who got it right: 98; Number of people who are out: 2; Prize Pot: $2,000; 80% question: Number of people who got it right: 93; Number of people who are out: 5; Prize Pot: $7,000; 70% question: Number of people who got it right: 84; Number of people who are out: 9; Prize Pot: $16,000; 60% question: Number of people who got it right: 49; Number of people who are out: 35; Prize Pot: $51,000; 50% question: Number of people who got it right: 31; Number of people who are out: 18; Prize Pot: $70,000; 45% question: Number of people who got it right: 13; Number of people who are out: 5; Number of people who passed: 13; Prize Pot: $87,000; 40% question: Number of people who got it right: 22; Number of people who are out: 4; Prize Pot: $90,000; 35% question: Number of people who got it right: 14; Number of people who are out: 7; Number of people who passed: 1; Prize Pot: $92,000; 30% question: Number of people who got it right: 9; Number of people who are out: 3; Prize Pot: $93,000; Number of people who left with $1,000: 3; 25% question: Number of people who got it right: 8; Number of people who are out: 1; Prize Pot: $94,000; 20% question: Number of people who got it right: 2; Number of people who are out: 5; Number of people who passed: 1 (Steve); Prize Pot: $96,000; 15% question: Number of people who got it right: 2; Number of people who are out: 1; 10% question: Number of people who got it right: 1; Number of people who passed: 1 (Jared); Prize Pot: $97,000; 5% question: Number of people who got it right: 2; Names of the remaining contestants: Steve, Jared; 1% question: Contestants who lost: Steve, Jared
11	11	"The Pasty Nightmare"	August 27, 2024	August 26, 2024	OPR-104	1.73	0.2/3
Episode 11 Results: 90% Question: Number of people who got it right: 97; Number of people who are out: 3; Prize Pot: $3,000; 80% question: Number of people who got it right: 94; Number of people who are out: 3; Prize Pot: $6,000; 70% question: Number of people who got it right: 78; Number of people who are out: 16; Prize Pot: $22,000; 60% question: Number of people who got it right: 52; Number of people who are out: 26; Prize Pot: $48,000; 50% question: Number of people who got it right: 49; Number of people who are out: 2; Number of people who passed: 1; Prize Pot: $51,000; 45% question: Number of people who got it right: 49; Number of people who are out: 1; Prize Pot: $52,000; 40% question: Number of people who got it right: 44; Number of people who are out: 1; Number of people who passed: 4; Prize Pot: $56,000; 35% question: Number of people who got it right: 12; Number of people who are out: 20; Number of people who passed: 16; Prize Pot: $91,000; 30% question: Number of people who got it right: 10; Number of people who are out: 12; Number of people who passed: 5; Prize Pot: $98,000; Number of people who left with $1,000: 1; 25% question: Number of people who got it right: 11; Number of people who are out: 4; 20% question: Number of people who got it right: 6; Number of people who are out: 5; 15% question: Number of people who got it right: 2; Number of people who are out: 4; 10% question: Number of people who are out: 1 (Nick); Number of people who passed: 1 (Michael S.); Prize Pot: $99,000; Name of the remaining contestant: Michael S.; 1% question: Contestant who won: Michael S. ($99,000)
12	12	"Budget The Luxuries First"	September 3, 2024	September 2, 2024	OPR-110	1.58	0.2/2
Episode 12 Results: 90% Question: Number of people who got it right: 99; Number of people who are out: 1; Prize Pot: $1,000; 80% question: Number of people who got it right: 93; Number of people who are out: 6; Prize Pot: $7,000; 70% question: Number of people who got it right: 85; Number of people who are out: 8; Prize Pot: $15,000; 60% question: Number of people who got it right: 76; Number of people who are out: 9; Prize Pot: $24,000; 50% question: Number of people who got it right: 69; Number of people who are out: 4; Number of people who passed: 3; Prize Pot: $31,000; 45% question: Number of people who got it right: 51; Number of people who are out: 15; Number of people who passed: 6; Prize Pot: $50,000; 40% question: Number of people who got it right: 52; Number of people who are out: 4; Number of people who passed: 1; Prize Pot: $54,000; 35% question: Number of people who got it right: 48; Number of people who are out: 5; Prize Pot: $58,000; 30% question: Number of people who got it right: 17; Number of people who are out: 11; Number of people who passed: 13; Prize Pot: $76,000; Number of people who left with $1,000: 7; 25% question: Number of people who got it right: 21; Number of people who are out: 3; Number of people who passed: 6; Prize Pot: $83.000; 20% question: Number of people who got it right: 14; Number of people who are out: 5; Number of people who passed: 8; Prize Pot: $91,00; 15% question: Number of people who got it right: 14; Number of people who are out: 8; 10% question: Number of people who got it right: 13; Number of people who are out: 1; 5% question: Number of people who got it right: 1; Number of people who are out: 10; Number of people who passed: 2 (Whitney, Allison); Prize Pot: $93,000; Names of the remaining contestants: Whitney, Luke, Allison; 1% question: Contestants who lost: Whitney, Luke, Allison
13	13	"If There's One Thing I Know About, It's Eggplant"	September 10, 2024	September 9, 2024	OPR-113	1.60	0.2/2
Episode 13 Results: 90% Question: Number of people who got it right: 93; Number of people who are out: 7; Prize Pot: $7,000; 80% question: Number of people who got it right: 90; Number of people who are out: 3; Prize Pot: $10,000; 70% question: Number of people who got it right: 82; Number of people who are out: 8; Prize Pot: $18,000; 60% question: Number of people who got it right: 65; Number of people who are out: 17; Prize Pot: $35,000; 50% question: Number of people who got it right: 53; Number of people who are out: 9; Number of people who passed: 3; Prize Pot: $47,000; 45% question: Number of people who got it right: 33; Number of people who are out: 12; Number of people who passed: 11; Prize Pot: $68,000; 40% question: Number of people who got it right: 23; Number of people who are out: 10; Number of people who passed: 11; Prize Pot: $86,000; 35% question: Number of people who got it right: 17; Number of people who are out: 17; Prize Pot: $93,000; 30% question: Number of people who got it right: 15; Number of people who are out: 1; Number of people who left with $1,000: 1; 25% question: Number of people who got it right: 15; 20% question: Number of people who got it right: 10; Number of people who are out: 3; Number of people who passed: 2; Prize Pot: $95,000; 15% question: Number of people who got it right: 10; Number of people who passed: 2; Prize Pot: $97,000; 10% question: Number of people who got it right: 8; Number of people who are out: 4; Prize Pot: $98,000; 5% question: Number of people who got it right: 2; Number of people who are out: 5; Number of people who passed: 1 (Kate); Prize Pot: $99,000; Names of the remaining contestants: Kate, Zach, Ben; 1% question: Contestants who won: Kate, Ben ($49,500 each); Contestant who lost: Zach

=== Season 2 (2025) ===
No. overall	No. in season	Title	Original release date	Prod. code	U.S. viewers (millions)	Rating/share (18-49)
14	1	"Human Weed Whacker"	June 10, 2025	OPN-104	1.32	0.2/3
Episode 1 Results: 90% Question: Number of people who got it right: 93; Number of people who are out: 7; Prize Pot: $7,000; 80% question: Number of people who got it right: 92; Number of people who are out: 1; Prize Pot: $8,000; 70% question: Number of people who got it right: 83; Number of people who are out: 9; Prize Pot: $17,000; 60% question: Number of people who got it right: 63; Number of people who are out: 20; Prize Pot: $37,000; 50% question: Number of people who got it right: 59; Number of people who are out: 1; Number of people who passed: 3; Prize Pot: $41,000; 45% question: Number of people who got it right: 29; Number of people who are out: 7; Number of people who passed: 26; Prize Pot: $73,000; 40% question: Number of people who got it right: 28; Number of people who are out: 17; Number of people who passed: 10; Prize Pot: $86,000; 35% question: Number of people who got it right: 30; Number of people who are out: 6; Number of people who passed: 2; Prize Pot: $89,000; 30% question: Number of people who got it right: 19; Number of people who are out: 10; Number of people who passed: 3; Prize Pot: $94,000; 25% question: Number of people who got it right: 12; Number of people who are out: 6; Number of people who passed: 4; Prize Pot: $98,000; 20% question: Number of people who got it right: 11; Number of people who are out: 5; 15% question: Number of people who got it right: 10; Number of people who are out: 1; 10% question: Number of people who got it right: 10; 5% question: Number of people who got it right: 5; Number of people who are out: 4; Number of people who passed: 1 (Krystof); Prize Pot: $99,000; Names of the remaining contestants: Alexis, Lauren, Tonie, Rafael, Aahil, Krystof; 1% question: Contestant who won: Rafael ($99,000); Contestants who lost: Alexis, Lauren, Tonie, Aahil, Krystof
15	2	"Shout out to Maddie"	June 17, 2025	OPN-102	1.37	0.2/3
Episode 2 Results: 90% Question: Number of people who got it right: 99; Number of people who are out: 1; Prize Pot: $1,000; 80% question: Number of people who got it right: 86; Number of people who are out: 13; Prize Pot: $14,000; 70% question: Number of people who got it right: 50; Number of people who are out: 36; Prize Pot: $50,000; 60% question: Number of people who got it right: 45; Number of people who are out: 5; Prize Pot: $55,000; 50% question: Number of people who got it right: 35; Number of people who are out: 3; Number of people who passed: 7; Prize Pot: $65,000; 45% question: Number of people who got it right: 36; Number of people who are out: 4; Number of people who passed: 2; Prize Pot: $69,000; 40% question: Number of people who got it right: 15; Number of people who are out: 6; Number of people who passed: 17; Prize Pot: $88,000; 35% question: Number of people who got it right: 26; Number of people who are out: 3; Number of people who passed: 3; Prize Pot: $91,000; 30% question: Number of people who got it right: 19; Number of people who are out: 8; Number of people who left with $1,000: 2; 25% question: Number of people who got it right: 12; Number of people who are out: 5; Number of people who passed: 2; Prize Pot: $93,000; 20% question: Number of people who got it right: 4; Number of people who are out: 9; Number of people who passed: 1; Prize Pot: $96,000; 15% question: Number of people who got it right: 3; Number of people who are out: 2; Prize Pot: $97,000; 10% question: Number of people who got it right: 2; Number of people who are out: 1; Prize Pot: $98,000; 5% question: Number of people who got it right: 2; Names of the remaining contestants: Julie, Eric; 1% question: Contestants who won: Julie, Eric ($49,000 each)
16	3	"Let's Goooooo!"	June 24, 2025	OPN-105	1.41	0.2/4
Episode 3 Results: 90% Question: Number of people who got it right: 97; Number of people who are out: 3; Prize Pot: $3,000; 80% question: Number of people who got it right: 91; Number of people who are out: 6; Prize Pot: $9,000; 70% question: Number of people who got it right: 88; Number of people who are out: 3; Prize Pot: $12,000; 60% question: Number of people who got it right: 71; Number of people who are out: 17; Prize Pot: $29,000; 50% question: Number of people who got it right: 54; Number of people who are out: 13; Number of people who passed: 4; Prize Pot: $46,000; 45% question: Number of people who got it right: 14; Number of people who are out: 17; Number of people who passed: 27; Prize Pot: $88,000; 40% question: Number of people who got it right: 26; Number of people who are out: 13; Number of people who passed: 2; Prize Pot: $92,000; 35% question: Number of people who got it right: 23; Number of people who are out: 3; Number of people who passed: 2; Prize Pot: $94,000; 30% question: Number of people who got it right: 20; Number of people who are out: 4; Number of people who left with $1,000: 1; 25% question: Number of people who got it right: 16; Number of people who are out: 3; Number of people who passed: 1; Prize Pot: $96,000; 20% question: Number of people who got it right: 7; Number of people who are out: 7; Number of people who passed: 3; Prize Pot: $99,000; 15% question: Number of people who got it right: 10; Number of people who are out: 3; 10% question: Number of people who got it right: 7; 5% question: Number of people who got it right: 4; Number of people who are out: 3; Names of the remaining contestants: Bri, Erin, Loren, Maya; 1% question: Contestants who lost: Bri, Erin, Loren, Maya
17	4	"Farmer Wants A Wife...and $100,000"	July 8, 2025	OPN-106	1.48	0.2/3
Episode 4 Results: 90% Question: Number of people who got it right: 99; Number of people who are out: 1; Prize Pot: $1,000; 80% question: Number of people who got it right: 90; Number of people who are out: 9; Prize Pot: $10,000; 70% question: Number of people who got it right: 83; Number of people who are out: 7; Prize Pot: $17,000; 60% question: Number of people who got it right: 64; Number of people who are out: 19; Prize Pot: $36,000; 50% question: Number of people who got it right: 35; Number of people who are out: 22; Number of people who passed: 7; Prize Pot: $65,000; 45% question: Number of people who got it right: 35; Number of people who are out: 4; Number of people who passed: 3; Prize Pot: $71,000; 40% question: Number of people who got it right: 25; Number of people who are out: 8; Number of people who passed: 5; Prize Pot: $81,000; 35% question: Number of people who got it right: 30; 30% question: Number of people who got it right: 13; Number of people who are out: 7; Number of people who passed: 8; Prize Pot: $90,000; Number of people who left with $1,000: 2; 25% question: Number of people who got it right: 19; Number of people who are out: 1; Number of people who passed: 1; Prize Pot: $91,000; 20% question: Number of people who got it right: 10; Number of people who are out: 7; Number of people who passed: 3; Prize Pot: $95,000; 15% question: Number of people who got it right: 10; Number of people who are out: 2; Number of people who passed: 1; Prize Pot: $96,000; 10% question: Number of people who got it right: 9; Number of people who are out: 2; 5% question: Number of people who got it right: 5; Number of people who are out: 2; Names of the remaining contestants: Rita, Parker, Maxwell, Jared, Josh, Steven S. (did not use pass), Jeff (did not use pass); 1% question: Contestants who won: Rita, Parker, Jared, Josh ($19,200 each), Jeff ($20,200); Contestants who lost: Steven S. ($1,000), Maxwell; Special Contestants: Allen Foster, Hunter Grayson, Landon Heaton, Ryan Black
18	5	"A Rabbi, a Mascot and a Psychic Walk into a Bar"	July 22, 2025	OPN-107	1.45	0.2/3
Episode 5 Results: 90% Question: Number of people who got it right: 99; Number of people who are out: 1; Prize Pot: $1,000; 80% question: Number of people who got it right: 98; Number of people who are out: 1; Prize Pot: $2,000; 70% question: Number of people who got it right: 93; Number of people who are out: 5; Prize Pot: $7,000; 60% question: Number of people who got it right: 80; Number of people who are out: 13; Prize Pot: $20,000; 50% question: Number of people who got it right: 53; Number of people who are out: 10; Number of people who passed: 17; Prize Pot: $47,000; 45% question: Number of people who got it right: 29; Number of people who are out: 18; Number of people who passed: 23; Prize Pot: $78,000; 40% question: Number of people who got it right: 35; Number of people who are out: 11; Number of people who passed: 6; Prize Pot: $85,000; 35% question: Number of people who got it right: 36; Number of people who are out: 4; Number of people who passed: 1; Prize Pot: $87,000; 30% question: Number of people who got it right: 29; Number of people who are out: 6; Number of people who passed: 1; Prize Pot: $90,000; Number of people who left with $1,000: 1; 25% question: Number of people who got it right: 17; Number of people who are out: 9; Number of people who passed: 4; Prize Pot: $94,000; 20% question: Number of people who got it right: 16; Number of people who are out: 3; Number of people who passed: 2; Prize Pot: $96,000; 15% question: Number of people who got it right: 11; Number of people who are out: 4; Number of people who passed: 3; Prize Pot: $99,000; 10% question: Number of people who got it right: 9; Number of people who are out: 5; 5% question: Number of people who got it right: 2; Number of people who are out: 7; Names of the remaining contestants: Taylor J., Joshua; 1% question: Contestants who lost: Taylor J., Joshua
19	6	"Joel-O Shots"	July 29, 2025	OPN-103	1.49	0.2/3
Episode 6 Results: 90% Question: Number of people who got it right: 100; 80% question: Number of people who got it right: 97; Number of people who are out: 3; Prize Pot: $3,000; 70% question: Number of people who got it right: 93; Number of people who are out: 4; Prize Pot: $7,000; 60% question: Number of people who got it right: 83; Number of people who are out: 10; Prize Pot: $17,000; 50% question: Number of people who got it right: 75; Number of people who are out: 8; Prize Pot: $31,000; 45% question: Number of people who got it right: 58; Number of people who are out: 4; Number of people who passed: 13; Prize Pot: $47,000; 40% question: Number of people who got it right: 47; Number of people who are out: 15; Number of people who passed: 9; Prize Pot: $66,000; 35% question: Number of people who got it right: 52; Number of people who are out: 2; Number of people who passed: 2; Prize Pot: $68,000; 30% question: Number of people who got it right: 19; Number of people who are out: 19; Number of people who passed: 8; Prize Pot: $82,000; Number of people who left with $1,000: 8; 25% question: Number of people who got it right: 9; Number of people who are out: 12; Number of people who passed: 6; Prize Pot: $88,000; 20% question: Number of people who got it right: 11; Number of people who are out: 4; Prize Pot: $89,000; 15% question: Number of people who got it right: 10; Number of people who are out: 1; 10% question: Number of people who got it right: 1; Number of people who are out: 7; Number of people who passed: 2; Prize Pot: $91,000; 5% question: Number of people who got it right: 2; Number of people who are out: 1; Prize Pot: $92,000; Names of the remaining contestants: Karima, Courtney Phillips; 1% question: Contestant who won: Courtney Phillips ($92,000); Contestant who lost: Karima
20	7	"What's Up, Buttercup?"	August 5, 2025	OPN-109	1.50	0.2/4
Episode 7 Results: 90% Question: Number of people who got it right: 91; Number of people who are out: 9; Prize Pot: $9,000; 80% question: Number of people who got it right: 91; 70% question: Number of people who got it right: 72; Number of people who are out: 19; Prize Pot: $28,000; 60% question: Number of people who got it right: 45; Number of people who are out: 27; Prize Pot: $55,000; 50% question: Number of people who got it right: 28; Number of people who are out: 9; Number of people who passed: 8; Prize Pot: $72,000; 45% question: Number of people who got it right: 16; Number of people who are out: 15; Number of people who passed: 5; Prize Pot: $87,000; 40% question: Number of people who got it right: 18; Number of people who are out: 2; Number of people who passed: 1; Prize Pot: $88,000; 35% question: Number of people who got it right: 13; Number of people who are out: 5; Number of people who passed: 1; Prize Pot: $93,000; 30% question: Number of people who got it right: 10; Number of people who are out: 1; Number of people who passed: 1; Prize Pot: $94,000; Number of people who left with $1,000: 2; 25% question: Number of people who got it right: 4; Number of people who are out: 5; Number of people who passed: 2; Prize Pot: $96,000; 20% question: Number of people who got it right: 6; 15% question: Number of people who got it right: 6; 10% question: Number of people who got it right: 2; Number of people who are out: 3; Number of people who passed: 1; Prize Pot: $98,000; 5% question: Number of people who got it right: 1; Number of people who are out: 2; Name of the remaining contestant: Jay; 1% question: Contestant who lost: Jay
21	8	"You're My Favorite Kicker!"	August 19, 2025	OPN-112	1.49	0.2/3
Episode 8 Results: 90% Question: Number of people who got it right: 90; Number of people who are out: 10; Prize Pot: $10,000; 80% question: Number of people who got it right: 85; Number of people who are out: 5; Prize Pot: $15,000; 70% question: Number of people who got it right: 65; Number of people who are out: 20; Prize Pot: $35,000; 60% question: Number of people who got it right: 61; Number of people who are out: 4; Prize Pot: $39,000; 50% question: Number of people who got it right: 16; Number of people who are out: 19; Number of people who passed: 26; Prize Pot: $84,000; 45% question: Number of people who got it right: 29; Number of people who are out: 9; Number of people who passed: 4; Prize Pot: $89,000; 40% question: Number of people who got it right: 21; Number of people who are out: 11; Number of people who passed: 1; Prize Pot: $93,000; 35% question: Number of people who got it right: 22; 30% question: Number of people who got it right: 17; Number of people who are out: 4; Number of people who left with $1,000: 1; 25% question: Number of people who got it right: 8; Number of people who are out: 6; Number of people who passed: 3; Prize Pot: $96,000; 20% question: Number of people who got it right: 8; Number of people who are out: 3; Prize Pot: $97,000; 15% question: Number of people who got it right: 6; Number of people who are out: 2; 10% question: Number of people who got it right: 4; Number of people who are out: 2; 5% question: Number of people who got it right: 3; Number of people who are out: 1; Names of the remaining contestants: Jack, Josie, Michael; 1% question: Contestant who won: Michael ($98,000); Contestants who lost: Jack ($1,000), Josie
22	9	"100% That Bish"	August 26, 2025	OPN-101	1.65	0.2/4
Episode 9 Results: 90% Question: Number of people who got it right: 97; Number of people who are out: 3; Prize Pot: $3,000; 80% question: Number of people who got it right: 91; Number of people who are out: 6; Prize Pot: $9,000; 70% question: Number of people who got it right: 82; Number of people who are out: 9; Prize Pot: $18,000; 60% question: Number of people who got it right: 78; Number of people who are out: 4; Prize Pot: $22,000; 50% question: Number of people who got it right: 60; Number of people who are out: 7; Number of people who passed: 11; Prize Pot: $40,000; 45% question: Number of people who got it right: 23; Number of people who are out: 18; Number of people who passed: 30; Prize Pot: $82,000; 40% question: Number of people who got it right: 39; Number of people who are out: 10; Number of people who passed: 4; Prize Pot: $86,000; 35% question: Number of people who got it right: 25; Number of people who are out: 14; Number of people who passed: 4; Prize Pot: $91,000; 30% question: Number of people who got it right: 23; Number of people who are out: 4; Number of people who passed: 1; Prize Pot: $94,000; Number of people who left with $1,000: 1; 25% question: Number of people who got it right: 18; Number of people who are out: 5; Number of people who passed: 1; Prize Pot: $96,000; 20% question: Number of people who got it right: 18; Number of people who are out: 1; 15% question: Number of people who got it right: 9; Number of people who are out: 9; Prize Pot: $97,000; 10% question: Number of people who got it right: 5; Number of people who are out: 3; Number of people who passed: 1; Prize Pot: $98,000; 5% question: Number of people who got it right: 4; Number of people who are out: 2; Names of the remaining contestants: Ava, Amanda, Adam, Caroline; 1% question: Contestants who lost: Ava, Amanda, Adam, Caroline
23	10	"Friendship Bracelets for Joel"	September 2, 2025	OPN-111	1.74	0.2/4
Episode 10 Results: 90% Question: Number of people who got it right: 98; Number of people who are out: 2; Prize Pot: $2,000; 80% question: Number of people who got it right: 86; Number of people who are out: 12; Prize Pot: $14,000; 70% question: Number of people who got it right: 75; Number of people who are out: 11; Prize Pot: $25,000; 60% question: Number of people who got it right: 74; Number of people who are out: 1; Prize Pot: $26,000; 50% question: Number of people who got it right: 66; Number of people who are out: 2; Number of people who passed: 6; Prize Pot: $34,000; 45% question: Number of people who got it right: 63; Number of people who are out: 7; Number of people who passed: 2; Prize Pot: $43,000; 40% question: Number of people who got it right: 46; Number of people who passed: 19; Prize Pot: $62,000; 35% question: Number of people who got it right: 54; Number of people who are out: 7; Number of people who passed: 4; Prize Pot: $67,000; 30% question: Number of people who got it right: 39; Number of people who are out: 6; Number of people who passed: 9; Prize Pot: $78,000; Number of people who left with $1,000: 4; 25% question: Number of people who got it right: 23; Number of people who are out: 16; Number of people who passed: 9; Prize Pot: $87,000; 20% question: Number of people who got it right: 21; Number of people who are out: 11; Prize Pot: $88,000; 15% question: Number of people who got it right: 13; Number of people who are out: 6; Number of people who passed: 2; Prize Pot: $91,000; 10% question: Number of people who got it right: 4; Number of people who are out: 8; Number of people who passed: 3; Prize Pot: $95,000; 5% question: Number of people who got it right: 4; Number of people who are out: 2; Number of people who passed: 1 (Andrea); Prize Pot: $96,000; Names of the remaining contestants: Edward G., Ivan, Andrea, Christina, Lesenia; 1% question: Contestants who won: Ivan, Andrea ($48,000 each); Contestants who lost: Edward G., Christina, Lesenia
24	11	"Singles Night: She Might Be Out of Your League"	September 9, 2025	OPN-110	1.67	0.2/4
Episode 11 Results: 90% Question: Number of people who got it right: 95; Number of people who are out: 5; Prize Pot: $5,000; 80% question: Number of people who got it right: 90; Number of people who are out: 5; Prize Pot: $10,000; 70% question: Number of people who got it right: 65; Number of people who are out: 25; Prize Pot: $35,000; 60% question: Number of people who got it right: 56; Number of people who are out: 9; Prize Pot: $44,000; 50% question: Number of people who got it right: 46; Number of people who are out: 4; Number of people who passed: 6; Prize Pot: $54,000; 45% question: Number of people who got it right: 34; Number of people who are out: 8; Number of people who passed: 10; Prize Pot: $70,000; 40% question: Number of people who got it right: 33; Number of people who are out: 9; Number of people who passed: 2; Prize Pot: $75,000; 35% question: Number of people who got it right: 24; Number of people who are out: 4; Number of people who passed: 7; Prize Pot: $82,000; 30% question: Number of people who got it right: 25; Number of people who are out: 3; Number of people who left with $1,000: 3; 25% question: Number of people who got it right: 20; Number of people who are out: 2; Number of people who passed: 3; Prize Pot: $85,000; 20% question: Number of people who got it right: 12; Number of people who are out: 10; Number of people who passed: 1; Prize Pot: $90,000; 15% question: Number of people who got it right: 4; Number of people who are out: 6; Number of people who passed: 3; Prize Pot: $95,000; 10% question: Number of people who got it right: 4; Number of people who are out: 3; 5% question: Number of people who got it right: 4; Number of people who passed: 2 (Sam, Garrett); Prize Pot: $97,000; Names of the remaining contestants: Sam, Garrett, Michael C., Tamara; 1% question: Contestants who won: Sam, Garrett, Michael C., Tamara ($24,250 each)
25	12	"Singles Night: Don't Wanna be a Nurse or a Purse"	September 9, 2025	OPN-108	1.67	0.2/4
Episode 12 Results: 90% Question: Number of people who got it right: 93; Number of people who are out: 7; Prize Pot: $7,000; 80% question: Number of people who got it right: 83; Number of people who are out: 10; Prize Pot: $17,000; 70% question: Number of people who got it right: 78; Number of people who are out: 5; Prize Pot: $22,000; 60% question: Number of people who got it right: 61; Number of people who are out: 17; Prize Pot: $39,000; 50% question: Number of people who got it right: 31; Number of people who are out: 19; Number of people who passed: 11; Prize Pot: $69,000; 45% question: Number of people who got it right: 38; Number of people who are out: 2; Number of people who passed: 2; Prize Pot: $71,000; 40% question: Number of people who got it right: 26; Number of people who are out: 11; Number of people who passed: 3; Prize Pot: $80,000; 35% question: Number of people who got it right: 17; Number of people who are out: 3; Number of people who passed: 9; Prize Pot: $90,000; 30% question: Number of people who got it right: 24; Number of people who are out: 2; 25% question: Number of people who got it right: 23; Number of people who are out: 1; Prize Pot: $91,000; 20% question: Number of people who got it right: 13; Number of people who are out: 9; Number of people who passed: 1; Prize Pot: $94,000; 15% question: Number of people who got it right: 11; Number of people who are out: 2; Number of people who passed: 1; Prize Pot: $95,000; 10% question: Number of people who got it right: 7; Number of people who are out: 4; Number of people who passed: 1; Prize Pot: $96,000; 5% question: Number of people who got it right: 4; Number of people who are out: 1; Number of people who passed: 3; Prize Pot: $99,000; Names of the remaining contestants: Donald, Shandi, Lucy, Jordan, Taylor G., Danny, Rossi; 1% question: Contestants who lost: Shandi, Lucy, Jordan, Taylor G., Danny, Rossi; Contestant who left: Donald ($1,428)
26	13	"Second Chance: I Put On My Redemption Wig"	September 16, 2025	OPN-113	1.79	0.2/4
Episode 13 Results: 90% Question: Number of people who got it right: 96; Number of people who are out: 4; Prize Pot: $4,000; 80% question: Number of people who got it right: 95; Number of people who are out: 1; Prize Pot: $5,000; 70% question: Number of people who got it right: 90; Number of people who are out: 5; Prize Pot: $10,000; 60% question: Number of people who got it right: 85; Number of people who are out: 5; Prize Pot: $15,000; 50% question: Number of people who got it right: 72; Number of people who are out: 7; Number of people who passed: 6; Prize Pot: $28,000; 45% question: Number of people who got it right: 57; Number of people who are out: 5; Number of people who passed: 16; Prize Pot: $49,000; 40% question: Number of people who got it right: 23; Number of people who are out: 32; Number of people who passed: 18; Prize Pot: $86,000; 35% question: Number of people who got it right: 20; Number of people who are out: 16; Number of people who passed: 5; Prize Pot: $93,000; 30% question: Number of people who got it right: 15; Number of people who are out: 8; Number of people who passed: 1; Prize Pot: $94,000; Number of people who left with $1,000: 1; 25% question: Number of people who got it right: 4; Number of people who are out: 9; Number of people who passed: 3; Prize Pot: $97,000; 20% question: Number of people who got it right: 7; 15% question: Number of people who got it right: 6; Number of people who are out: 1; 10% question: Number of people who got it right: 3; Number of people who are out: 2; Number of people who passed: 1 (Ethan); Prize Pot: $98,000; 5% question: Number of people who got it right: 3; Number of people who are out: 1; Number of people who passed: 1 (Paul); Prize Pot: $99,000; Names of the remaining contestants: Aahil, Paul, Ethan; 1% question: Contestant who won: Aahil ($99,000); Contestants who lost: Paul, Ethan
27	14	"Second Chance: You Gotta Risk It For The Biscuit"	September 16, 2025	OPN-114	1.79	0.2/4
Episode 14 Results: 90% Question: Number of people who got it right: 93; Number of people who are out: 7; Prize Pot: $7,000; 80% question: Number of people who got it right: 77; Number of people who are out: 16; Prize Pot: $23,000; 70% question: Number of people who got it right: 73; Number of people who are out: 4; Prize Pot: $27,000; 60% question: Number of people who got it right: 70; Number of people who are out: 3; Prize Pot: $30,000; 50% question: Number of people who got it right: 58; Number of people who are out: 9; Number of people who passed: 3; Prize Pot: $42,000; 45% question: Number of people who got it right: 56; Number of people who passed: 5; Prize Pot: $47,000; 40% question: Number of people who got it right: 46; Number of people who are out: 12; Number of people who passed: 3; Prize Pot: $57,000; 35% question: Number of people who got it right: 32; Number of people who are out: 2; Number of people who passed: 15; Prize Pot: $73,000; 30% question: Number of people who got it right: 38; Number of people who are out: 3; Number of people who passed: 2; Prize Pot: $76,000; Number of people who left with $1,000: 4; 25% question: Number of people who got it right: 19; Number of people who are out: 13; Number of people who passed: 8; Prize Pot: $86,000; 20% question: Number of people who got it right: 11; Number of people who are out: 10; Number of people who passed: 6; Prize Pot: $92,000; 15% question: Number of people who got it right: 9; Number of people who are out: 4; Number of people who passed: 4; Prize Pot: $96,000; 10% question: Number of people who got it right: 4; Number of people who are out: 9; 5% question: Number of people who got it right: 2; Number of people who are out: 2; Names of the remaining contestants: Andrew, Hannah; 1% question: Contestant who won: Andrew ($96,000); Contestant who lost: Hannah

=== Season 3 (2026) ===
No. overall	No. in season	Title	Original release date	Prod. code	U.S. viewers (millions)	Rating (18-49)
28	1	"Split Decision"	April 13, 2026	OPN-209	N/A	TBA
Episode 1 Results: 90% Question: Number of people who got it right: 89; Number of people who are out: 11; Prize Pot: $11,000; 80% question: Number of people who got it right: 86; Number of people who are out: 3; Prize Pot: $14,000; 70% question: Number of people who got it right: 72; Number of people who are out: 14; Prize Pot: $28,000; 60% question: Number of people who got it right: 69; Number of people who are out: 3; Prize Pot: $31,000; 50% question: Number of people who got it right: 54; Number of people who are out: 7; Number of people who passed: 8; Prize Pot: $46,000; 45% question: Number of people who got it right: 53; Number of people who are out: 3; Number of people who passed: 6; Prize Pot: $54,000; 40% question: Number of people who got it right: 45; Number of people who are out: 9; Number of people who passed: 5; Prize Pot: $65,000; 35% question: Number of people who got it right: 40; Number of people who are out: 6; Number of people who passed: 4; Prize Pot: $73,000; 30% question: Number of people who got it right: 18; Number of people who are out: 8; Number of people who passed: 16; Prize Pot: $92,000; Number of people who left with $1,000: 2; 25% question: Number of people who got it right: 14; Number of people who are out: 15; Number of people who passed: 5; Prize Pot: $97,000; 20% question: Number of people who got it right: 18; Number of people who are out: 1; 15% question: Number of people who got it right: 12; Number of people who are out: 6; 10% question: Number of people who got it right: 9; Number of people who are out: 2; Number of people who passed: 1; Prize Pot: $98,000; 5% question: Number of people who got it right: 5; Number of people who are out: 5; Names of the remaining contestants: Amelie, Gabe, Mark, Kurt, Thomas; 1% question: Contestant who won: Gabe ($98,000); Contestants who lost: Amelie, Mark, Kurt, Thomas
29	2	"We Found Waldo"	April 20, 2026	OPN-202	N/A	TBA
Episode 2 Results: 90% Question: Number of people who got it right: 98; Number of people who are out: 2; Prize Pot: $2,000; 80% question: Number of people who got it right: 92; Number of people who are out: 6; Prize Pot: $8,000; 70% question: Number of people who got it right: 86; Number of people who are out: 6; Prize Pot: $14,000; 60% question: Number of people who got it right: 58; Number of people who are out: 28; Prize Pot: $42,000; 50% question: Number of people who got it right: 47; Number of people who are out: 5; Number of people who passed: 6; Prize Pot: $53,000; 45% question: Number of people who got it right: 43; Number of people who are out: 8; Number of people who passed: 2; Prize Pot: $62,000; 40% question: Number of people who got it right: 38; Number of people who are out: 3; Number of people who passed: 4; Prize Pot: $68,000; 35% question: Number of people who got it right: 24; Number of people who are out: 7; Number of people who passed: 11; Prize Pot: $82,000; 30% question: Number of people who got it right: 30; Number of people who are out: 5; Prize Pot: $83,000; 25% question: Number of people who got it right: 17; Number of people who are out: 9; Number of people who passed: 4; Prize Pot: $89,000; 20% question: Number of people who got it right: 16; Number of people who are out: 3; Number of people who passed: 2; Prize Pot: $93,000; 15% question: Number of people who got it right: 5; Number of people who are out: 9; Number of people who passed: 4; Prize Pot: $99,000; 10% question: Number of people who got it right: 7; Number of people who are out: 2; 5% question: Number of people who got it right: 5; Number of people who are out: 1; Number of people who passed: 1 (Craig); Prize Pot: $100,000; Names of the remaining contestants: Parker, Craig, Alison, Kevin C., Vu, Alex; 1% question: Contestants who won: Kevin C., Vu, Alex ($33,333 each); Contestants who lost: Parker, Craig, Alison
30	3	"Yes We Can... Get it Wrong"	April 27, 2026	OPN-203	N/A	TBA
Episode 3 Results: 90% Question: Number of people who got it right: 98; Number of people who are out: 2; Prize Pot: $2,000; 80% question: Number of people who got it right: 98; 70% question: Number of people who got it right: 80; Number of people who are out: 18; Prize Pot: $20,000; 60% question: Number of people who got it right: 78; Number of people who are out: 2; Prize Pot: $22,000; 50% question: Number of people who got it right: 24; Number of people who are out: 12; Number of people who passed: 42; Prize Pot: $76,000; 45% question: Number of people who got it right: 54; Number of people who are out: 7; Number of people who passed: 5; Prize Pot: $81,000; 40% question: Number of people who got it right: 22; Number of people who are out: 31; Number of people who passed: 6; Prize Pot: $93,000; 35% question: Number of people who got it right: 28; 30% question: Number of people who got it right: 24; Number of people who are out: 4; 25% question: Number of people who got it right: 21; Number of people who are out: 3; Prize Pot: $94,000; 20% question: Number of people who got it right: 19; Number of people who are out: 1; Number of people who passed: 1; Prize Pot: $95,000; 15% question: Number of people who got it right: 11; Number of people who are out: 6; Number of people who passed: 3; Prize Pot: $98,000; 10% question: Number of people who got it right: 7; Number of people who are out: 7; 5% question: Number of people who got it right: 2; Number of people who are out: 3; Number of people who passed: 2 (Peyton, Madeline); Prize Pot: $100,000; Names of the remaining contestants: Erica, Peyton, Madeline, Nicky; 1% question: Contestants who lost: Erica, Peyton, Madeline, Nicky
31	4	"The Boobie Queen"	May 4, 2026	OPN-204	N/A	TBA
Episode 4 Results: 90% Question: Number of people who got it right: 97; Number of people who are out: 3; Prize Pot: $3,000; 80% question: Number of people who got it right: 89; Number of people who are out: 8; Prize Pot: $11,000; 70% question: Number of people who got it right: 72; Number of people who are out: 17; Prize Pot: $28,000; 60% question: Number of people who got it right: 68; Number of people who are out: 4; Prize Pot: $32,000; 50% question: Number of people who got it right: 63; Number of people who are out: 3; Number of people who passed: 2; Prize Pot: $37,000; 45% question: Number of people who got it right: 41; Number of people who are out: 3; Number of people who passed: 21; Prize Pot: $61,000; 40% question: Number of people who got it right: 52; Number of people who are out: 2; Number of people who passed: 8; Prize Pot: $69,000; 35% question: Number of people who got it right: 53; Number of people who are out: 4; Number of people who passed: 3; Prize Pot: $73,000; 30% question: Number of people who got it right: 37; Number of people who are out: 9; Number of people who passed: 7; Prize Pot: $80,000; Number of people who left with $1,000: 3; 25% question: Number of people who got it right: 14; Number of people who are out: 16; Number of people who passed: 14; Prize Pot: $94,000; 20% question: Number of people who got it right: 18; Number of people who are out: 9; Number of people who passed: 1; Prize Pot: $95,000; 15% question: Number of people who got it right: 9; Number of people who are out: 8; Number of people who passed: 2; Prize Pot: $97,000; 10% question: Number of people who got it right: 9; Number of people who are out: 2; 5% question: Number of people who got it right: 5; Number of people who are out: 4; Names of the remaining contestants: Olivia, Michael T., Kennedi, Corinna, Alan; 1% question: Contestants who won: Olivia, Michael T., Alan ($32,333 each); Contestants who lost: Kennedi, Corinna
32	5	"The 1% Smack Down"	May 18, 2026	OPN-205	N/A	TBA
Episode 5 Results: 90% Question: Number of people who got it right: 99; Number of people who are out: 1; Prize Pot: $1,000; 80% question: Number of people who got it right: 94; Number of people who are out: 5; Prize Pot: $6,000; 70% question: Number of people who got it right: 75; Number of people who are out: 19; Prize Pot: $25,000; 60% question: Number of people who got it right: 61; Number of people who are out: 14; Prize Pot: $39,000; 50% question: Number of people who got it right: 41; Number of people who are out: 15; Number of people who passed: 5; Prize Pot: $59,000; 45% question: Number of people who got it right: 35; Number of people who are out: 3; Number of people who passed: 8; Prize Pot: $70,000; 40% question: Number of people who got it right: 25; Number of people who are out: 11; Number of people who passed: 7; Prize Pot: $84,000; 35% question: Number of people who got it right: 22; Number of people who are out: 7; Number of people who passed: 3; Prize Pot: $90,000; 30% question: Number of people who got it right: 15; Number of people who are out: 6; Number of people who passed: 4; Prize Pot: $95,000; 25% question: Number of people who got it right: 13; Number of people who are out: 5; Number of people who passed: 1; Prize Pot: $96,000; 20% question: Number of people who got it right: 14; 15% question: Number of people who got it right: 11; Number of people who are out: 2; Number of people who passed: 1; Prize Pot: $97,000; 10% question: Number of people who got it right: 6; Number of people who are out: 5; Number of people who passed: 1; Prize Pot: $98,000; 5% question: Number of people who are out: 5; Number of people who passed: 2; Prize Pot: $100,000; Names of the remaining contestants: Ann, Branden F.; 1% question: Contestants who left: Ann, Branden F. ($5,000 each)
33	6	"Balling Out for $100k"	June 1, 2026	OPN-201	N/A	TBA
Episode 6 Results: 90% Question: Number of people who got it right: 89; Number of people who are out: 11; Prize Pot: $11,000; 80% question: Number of people who got it right: 85; Number of people who are out: 4; Prize Pot: $15,000; 70% question: Number of people who got it right: 79; Number of people who are out: 6; Prize Pot: $21,000; 60% question: Number of people who got it right: 71; Number of people who are out: 8; Prize Pot: $29,000; 50% question: Number of people who got it right: 66; Number of people who are out: 1; Number of people who passed: 4; Prize Pot: $34,000; 45% question: Number of people who got it right: 25; Number of people who are out: 5; Number of people who passed: 40; Prize Pot: $76,000; 40% question: Number of people who got it right: 26; Number of people who are out: 28; Number of people who passed: 11; Prize Pot: $92,000; 35% question: Number of people who got it right: 13; Number of people who are out: 23; Number of people who passed: 1; Prize Pot: $96,000; 30% question: Number of people who got it right: 8; Number of people who are out: 5; Number of people who passed: 1; Prize Pot: $97,000; 25% question: Number of people who got it right: 9; 20% question: Number of people who got it right: 8; Number of people who are out: 1; Prize Pot: $98,000; 15% question: Number of people who got it right: 3; Number of people who are out: 3; Number of people who passed: 2; Prize Pot: $100,000; 10% question: Number of people who got it right: 4; Number of people who are out: 1; 5% question: Number of people who got it right: 3; Number of people who are out: 1; Names of the remaining contestants: David W., Brooke, Nick; 1% question: Contestants who lost: David W., Brooke, Nick; Special Contestants: Ryan Kellogg, Allisha Gray, Naz Hillmon, Rhyne Howard
34	7	"A Second Chance at $100k"	June 8, 2026	OPN-206	N/A	TBA
Episode 7 Results: 90% Question: Number of people who got it right: 99; Number of people who are out: 1; Prize Pot: $1,000; 80% question: Number of people who got it right: 99; 70% question: Number of people who got it right: 98; Number of people who are out: 1; Prize Pot: $2,000; 60% question: Number of people who got it right: 95; Number of people who are out: 3; Prize Pot: $5,000; 50% question: Number of people who got it right: 79; Number of people who are out: 4; Number of people who passed: 12; Prize Pot: $21,000; 45% question: Number of people who got it right: 89; Number of people who are out: 2; Prize Pot: $22,000; 40% question: Number of people who got it right: 77; Number of people who are out: 5; Number of people who passed: 7; Prize Pot: $33,000; 35% question: Number of people who got it right: 40; Number of people who are out: 22; Number of people who passed: 22; Prize Pot: $66,000; 30% question: Number of people who got it right: 43; Number of people who are out: 12; Number of people who passed: 7; Prize Pot: $78,000; 25% question: Number of people who got it right: 38; Number of people who are out: 7; Number of people who passed: 5; Prize Pot: $85,000; 20% question: Number of people who got it right: 37; Number of people who are out: 4; Number of people who passed: 2; Prize Pot: $88,000; 15% question: Number of people who got it right: 17; Number of people who are out: 20; Number of people who passed: 2; Prize Pot: $94,000; 10% question: Number of people who got it right: 19; 5% question: Number of people who got it right: 8; Number of people who are out: 7; Number of people who passed: 4; Prize Pot: $98,000; Names of the remaining contestants: Jared, Sebastian, Erika, Samantha, Brooke, Scott M., Lilia, Logan, Ryan, Josh, David, Sahand; 1% question: Contestants who won: Jared, Sebastian, Samantha, Scott M., Josh, David, Sahand ($12,250 each), Brooke ($13,250); Contestants who lost: Erika, Lilia ($1,000), Logan, Ryan
35	8	"Singles Night"	July 13, 2026	OPN-208	N/A	TBA
Episode 8 Results: 90% Question: Number of people who got it right: 98; Number of people who are out: 2; Prize Pot: $2,000; 80% question: Number of people who got it right: 79; Number of people who are out: 19; Prize Pot: $21,000; 70% question: Number of people who got it right: 61; Number of people who are out: 18; Prize Pot: $39,000; 60% question: Number of people who got it right: 44; Number of people who are out: 17; Prize Pot: $56,000; 50% question: Number of people who got it right: 18; Number of people who are out: 12; Number of people who passed: 14; Prize Pot: $82,000; 45% question: Number of people who got it right: 29; Number of people who are out: 2; Number of people who passed: 1; Prize Pot: $84,000; 40% question: Number of people who got it right: 14; Number of people who are out: 8; Number of people who passed: 8; Prize Pot: $94,000; 35% question: Number of people who got it right: 19; Number of people who are out: 3; 30% question: Number of people who got it right: 15; Number of people who are out: 3; Number of people who passed: 1; Prize Pot: $96,000; 25% question: Number of people who got it right: 14; Number of people who are out: 2; Prize Pot: $97,000; 20% question: Number of people who got it right: 13; Number of people who are out: 1; Prize Pot: $98,000; 15% question: Number of people who got it right: 10; Number of people who are out: 2; Number of people who passed: 1; Prize Pot: $99,000; 10% question: Number of people who got it right: 3; Number of people who are out: 7; Number of people who passed: 1; Prize Pot: $100,000; 5% question: Number of people who got it right: 2; Number of people who are out: 2; Names of the remaining contestants: Mitch, Austin H.; 1% question: Contestant who won: Austin H. ($100,000); Contestant who lost: Mitch; Special Contestants: Brandon Rogers, Ty Ferrell
36	9	"I'm Just Dumb"	July 20, 2026	OPN-211	N/A	TBA
Episode 9 Results: 90% Question: Number of people who got it right: 100; 80% question: Number of people who got it right: 70; Number of people who are out: 30; Prize Pot: $30,000; 70% question: Number of people who got it right: 66; Number of people who are out: 4; Prize Pot: $34,000; 60% question: Number of people who got it right: 64; Number of people who are out: 2; Prize Pot: $36,000; 50% question: Number of people who got it right: 56; Number of people who are out: 5; Number of people who passed: 3; Prize Pot: $44,000; 45% question: Number of people who got it right: 48; Number of people who are out: 8; Number of people who passed: 3; Prize Pot: $55,000; 40% question: Number of people who got it right: 33; Number of people who are out: 5; Number of people who passed: 13; Prize Pot: $70,000; 35% question: Number of people who got it right: 27; Number of people who are out: 17; Number of people who passed: 2; Prize Pot: $82,000; 30% question: Number of people who got it right: 27; Number of people who are out: 2; 25% question: Number of people who got it right: 11; Number of people who are out: 7; Number of people who passed: 9; Prize Pot: $92,000; 20% question: Number of people who got it right: 16; Number of people who are out: 2; Number of people who passed: 2; Prize Pot: $94,000; 15% question: Number of people who got it right: 5; Number of people who are out: 8; Number of people who passed: 3; Prize Pot: $98,000; 10% question: Number of people who got it right: 4; Number of people who are out: 3; Number of people who passed: 1; Prize Pot: $99,000; 5% question: Number of people who got it right: 2; Number of people who are out: 2; Number of people who passed: 1 (Cassidy); Prize Pot: $100,000; Names of the remaining contestants: Cassidy, Alan, Andrew; 1% question: Contestants who won: Alan, Andrew ($50,000 each); Contestant who lost: Cassidy
37	10	"Ladies Night"	July 27, 2026	OPN-210	N/A	TBA
Episode 10 Results: 90% Question: Number of people who got it right: 96; Number of people who are out: 4; Prize Pot: $4,000; 80% question: Number of people who got it right: 92; Number of people who are out: 4; Prize Pot: $8,000; 70% question: Number of people who got it right: 89; Number of people who are out: 3; Prize Pot: $11,000; 60% question: Number of people who got it right: 84; Number of people who are out: 5; Prize Pot: $16,000; 50% question: Number of people who got it right: 63; Number of people who are out: 17; Number of people who passed: 4; Prize Pot: $37,000; 45% question: Number of people who got it right: 3; Number of people who are out: 14; Number of people who passed: 50; Prize Pot: $97,000; 40% question: Number of people who got it right: 48; Number of people who are out: 5; 35% question: Number of people who got it right: 23; Number of people who are out: 23; Number of people who passed: 2; Prize Pot: $99,000; 30% question: Number of people who got it right: 14; Number of people who are out: 11; Prize Pot: $100,000; 25% question: Number of people who got it right: 4; Number of people who are out: 10; 20% question: Number of people who got it right: 3; Number of people who are out: 1; 15% question: Number of people who got it right: 1 (Jasmine); Number of people who are out: 2; Name of the remaining contestant: Jasmine; 10% question: This question was played just for fun.; 5% question: This question was played just for fun.; 1% question: Contestant who left: Jasmine ($10,000)
38	11	"Hot Wife"	August 10, 2026	OPN-207	N/A	TBA
Episode 11 Results: 90% Question: Number of people who got it right: 97; Number of people who are out: 3; Prize Pot: $3,000; 80% question: Number of people who got it right: 80; Number of people who are out: 17; Prize Pot: $20,000; 70% question: Number of people who got it right: 76; Number of people who are out: 4; Prize Pot: $24,000; 60% question: Number of people who got it right: 66; Number of people who are out: 10; Prize Pot: $34,000; 50% question: Number of people who got it right: 43; Number of people who are out: 15; Number of people who passed: 8; Prize Pot: $57,000; 45% question: Number of people who got it right: 33; Number of people who are out: 14; Number of people who passed: 4; Prize Pot: $70,000; 40% question: Number of people who got it right: 27; Number of people who are out: 4; Number of people who passed: 6; Prize Pot: $78,000; 35% question: Number of people who got it right: 26; Number of people who are out: 3; Number of people who passed: 4; Prize Pot: $84,000; 30% question: Number of people who got it right: 19; Number of people who are out: 4; Number of people who passed: 3; Prize Pot: $88,000; Number of people who left with $1,000: 4; 25% question: Number of people who got it right: 21; Number of people who are out: 1; 20% question: Number of people who got it right: 13; Number of people who are out: 7; Number of people who passed: 1; Prize Pot: $90,000; 15% question: Number of people who got it right: 6; Number of people who are out: 5; Number of people who passed: 3; Prize Pot: $94,000; 10% question: Number of people who got it right: 7; Number of people who are out: 1; Number of people who passed: 1 (John L.); Prize Pot: $95,000; 5% question: Number of people who got it right: 2; Number of people who are out: 5; Number of people who passed: 1 (Jacob); Prize Pot: $96,000; Names of the remaining contestants: John L., Tom, Jacob; 1% question: Contestant(s) who lost: John L., Tom, Jacob
39	12	"Second Chance Night"	August 17, 2026	OPN-212	N/A	TBA
Episode 12 Results: 90% Question: Number of people who got it right: 98; Number of people who are out: 2; Prize Pot: $2,000; 80% question: Number of people who got it right: 92; Number of people who are out: 6; Prize Pot: $8,000; 70% question: Number of people who got it right: 76; Number of people who are out: 16; Prize Pot: $24,000; 60% question: Number of people who got it right: 26; Number of people who are out: 50; Prize Pot: $74,000; 50% question: Number of people who got it right: 26; 45% question: Number of people who got it right: 22; Number of people who are out: 3; Number of people who passed: 1; Prize Pot: $78,000; 40% question: Number of people who got it right: 20; Number of people who are out: 1; Number of people who passed: 2; Prize Pot: $81,000; 35% question: Number of people who got it right: 12; Number of people who are out: 3; Number of people who passed: 7; Prize Pot: $89,000; 30% question: Number of people who got it right: 14; Number of people who are out: 2; Number of people who left with $1,000: 3; 25% question: Number of people who got it right: 6; Number of people who are out: 6; Number of people who passed: 2; Prize Pot: $94,000; 20% question: Number of people who got it right: 4; Number of people who are out: 2; Number of people who passed: 2; Prize Pot: $96,000; 15% question: Number of people who got it right: 6; 10% question: Number of people who got it right: 3; Number of people who are out: 2; Number of people who passed: 1; Prize Pot: $97,000; 5% question: Number of people who got it right: 3; Number of people who are out: 1; Names of the remaining contestants: Kara, Phillip, Steven; 1% question: Contestants who won: Kara, Phillip ($48,500 each); Contestant who left: Steven ($10,000)
