= Farmer Wants a Wife (American TV series) season 1 =

Farmer Wants a Wife
- Season 1
- Promotional poster
- Starring: Allen Foster; Hunter Grayson; Landon Heaton; Ryan Black
- Presented by: Jennifer Nettles
- No. of contestants: 32
- No. of episodes: 11

Release
- Original network: Fox
- Original release: March 8 – May 17, 2023

Season chronology
- Next → Season 2

The first season of the Farmer Wants a Wife reboot premiered on March 8, 2023, with Jennifer Nettles as host. It features four farmers courting 8 women each.

The season concluded on May 17, 2023, with three of the four farmers finding love.

== Production ==
=== Filming and development ===
The series initially aired on The CW in 2008, but was cancelled after one season. On September 7, 2022, Fox announced that they had ordered a reboot of the series, to be produced by Eureka Productions.

== Farmers ==
The four farmers searching for love were revealed on January 17, 2023.

Farmer	Age	Location	Profession
Allen Foster	32	Santa Fe, Tennessee	Cattle Rancher
Hunter Grayson	31	Watkinsville, Georgia	Cattle and Horse Rancher
Landon Heaton	35	Alva, Oklahoma	Cattle Rancher and Farmer
Ryan Black	32	Shelby, North Carolina	Horse Trainer and Breeder

=== Future appearances ===
==== The 1% Club ====
All four farmers competed in season 2 of The 1% Club. Allen and Landon were eliminated on the 50% question, while Hunter and Ryan were eliminated on the 20% question.

== Contestants ==
The 32 women searching for love were announced on February 14, 2023.

=== Allen’s Women ===
Name	Age	Hometown	Occupation	Outcome	Place
Khelsi Stone	29	Cataula, Georgia	School Teacher	Winner	1
Rebecca Rosell	31	Moorpark, California	Horse Trainer	Runner-Up	2
Cassidy Jo Jacks	28	Springville, Alabama	Medical Sales Rep	Episode 8	3 (quit)
Kiersten Newman	30	Friendswood, Texas	Blogger	Episode 5	4
Sloan Tate	34	Collierville, Tennessee	Spirituality Coach	Episode 2	5
Jordan Brady	28	Kennesaw, Georgia	Yoga Teacher	Episode 1	6-7
Julia Rodriguez	24	San Antonio, Texas	Cybersecurity Analyst	Episode 1	6-7
Ariana Raebru	31	Weehawken, New Jersey	Sales Manager	Episode 1	8 (quit)

=== Hunter’s Women ===
Name	Age	Hometown	Occupation	Outcome	Place
Meghan Baker	23	Midland, Texas	Event Coordinator	Winner	1
Sydney Groom	22	Cross City, Florida	Music Booking Agent	Runner-Up	2
Stephanie Sanchez	29	Temecula, California	Sommelier	Episode 9	3
DeVonne Ryter	25	Hayden, Idaho	Marketing Director	Episode 9	4
Meghan Baker	(Returned to competition)			Episode 6	Quit (Note: Baker left in episode 6 after the death of her grandfather, but returned in episode 8.)
Talia Gutierrez	32	Atlanta, Georgia	Therapist	Episode 3	5
Emma Feeheley	24	Farmington, Michigan	Dance Coach	Episode 1	6-8
Hayley Butcher	31	Cedar Lake, Indiana	HR Manager	Episode 1	6-8
Sarah Ruhlman	34	Kansas City, Missouri	Content Creator	Episode 1	6-8

=== Landon’s Women ===
Name	Age	Hometown	Occupation	Outcome	Place
Ashley Larea	27	Dallas, Texas	Executive Coordinator	Winner	1
Ashley Rader	32	Orlando, Florida	Veteran Hospital AMSA	Runner-Up	2
Zoe Weaver	25	Nashville, Tennessee	Photographer	Episode 9	3
Kylie Blakely	25	Kissimmee, Florida	Veteran Affairs Advocate	Episode 7	4
Nicole Schmidt	29	Allentown, Pennsylvania	Radiation Oncology Supervisor	Episode 4	5
Erica Bridge	27	Milwaukee, Wisconsin	Restaurant General Manager	Episode 1	6-8
Heather Carwile	39	Dallas, Texas	Real Estate Investor	Episode 1	6-8
Jessica Rucker	26	Boston, Massachusetts	Waitress	Episode 1	6-8

=== Ryan’s Women ===
Name	Age	Hometown	Occupation	Outcome	Place
Haley Ramirez	28	Manhattan, New York	Recruiter	Episode 11	1 (quit) (Note: Ramirez was originally eliminated in episode 6, but was brought back in episode 10 after Black regretted his decision. She ultimately rejected his request to pursue a relationship in episode 11.)
Sara Vincent	27	Brea, California	Bartender	Runner-Up	2
Sarah Ingle	27	Brooklyn, New York	Global Communications Director	Episode 10	3 (quit)
Lily Bauer	24	Potomac, Maryland	Psychology Student	Episode 8	4 (quit)
Haley Ramirez	(Returned to competition)			Episode 6	
Porschia Paxton	29	Lewisville, Texas	Accounting Assistant	Episode 4	5 (quit)
Brittany Hansen	33	Sacramento, California	Travel Blogger	Episode 1	6-8
McKenzie Hulme	29	Phoenix, Arizona	Interior Designer	Episode 1	6-8
Shartaysia Rogers	29	Latta, South Carolina	Mental Health Therapist	Episode 1	6-8

== Elimination table ==
=== Allen's Women ===
Contestant	Episode										
Contestant	1	2	3	4	5	6	7	8	9	10	11
Khelsi	In		Date		In				Family	In	Winner
Rebecca	In				Date		In			Family	Runner-Up
Cassidy Jo	Date		In				Date	Quit			
Kiersten	In				Eliminated						
Sloan	In	Eliminated									
Jordan	Eliminated										
Julia	Eliminated										
Ariana	Quit										

=== Hunter's Women ===
Contestant	Episode										
Contestant	1	2	3	4	5	6	7	8	9	10	11
Meghan	In				Date	Quit		Returned	In	Family	Winner
Sydney	Date		In						Family	In	Runner-Up
Stephanie	In		Date		In				Eliminated		
DeVonne	In						Date		Eliminated		
Talia	In		Eliminated								
Emma	Eliminated										
Hayley	Eliminated										
Sarah	Eliminated										

=== Landon's Women ===
Contestant	Episode										
Contestant	1	2	3	4	5	6	7	8	9	10 (Note: Landon exited the show at the end of episode 9 before his family visit with Larea could take place due to the death of his father, but returned in episode 11 for the Final Decisions.)	11
Ashley L.	In				Date		In			n/a	Winner
Ashley R.	Date		In						Family	n/a	Runner-Up
Zoe	In						Date		Eliminated		
Kylie	In		Date		In		Eliminated				
Nicole	In			Eliminated							
Erica	Eliminated										
Heather	Eliminated										
Jessica	Eliminated										

=== Ryan's Women ===
Contestant	Episode										
Contestant	1	2	3	4	5	6	7	8	9	10	11
Haley	Date		In			Eliminated				Returned	Quit
Sara V.	In						Date		Family	In	Runner-Up
Sarah I.	In				Date		In			Family	Quit
Lily	In		Date		In			Quit			
Porschia	In			Quit							
Brittany	Eliminated										
McKenzie	Eliminated										
Shartaysia	Eliminated										

== Episodes ==
No. overall	No. in season	Title	Original release date	Prod. code	U.S. viewers (millions)	Rating (18–49)
1	1	"Welcome to the Farms"	March 8, 2023	101	2.46	0.4
2	2	"Down & Dirty on the Farm"	March 15, 2023	102	2.28	0.4
3	3	"Why Won't He Kiss Miss"	March 22, 2023	103	1.97	0.2
4	4	"You Can't Have Your Cake & Eat It Too"	March 29, 2023	104	2.08	0.3
5	5	"Tears, Tantrums and Tailgates"	April 5, 2023	105	1.96	0.3
6	6	"An Emotional Goodbye"	April 12, 2023	106	2.03	0.2
7	7	"Barn Dance Romance"	April 19, 2023	107	2.12	0.3
8	8	"Is There Room for One More?"	April 26, 2023	108	2.17	0.3
9	9	"Meet the Families"	May 3, 2023	109	2.06	0.3
10	10	"I've Made a Mistake"	May 10, 2023	110	2.12	0.3
11	11	"The Final Decisions"	May 17, 2023	111	2.25	0.3
