= Orchard Farm, Missouri =

Unincorporated community in Missouri, U.S.

Coordinates: 38°52′43″N 90°26′46″W

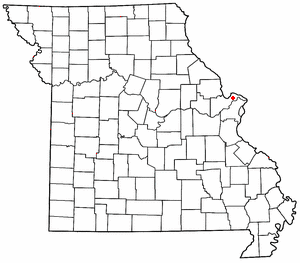

Orchard Farm is an unincorporated community in St. Charles County, Missouri, United States.

== History ==
A post office called Orchard Farm was established in 1894, and remained in operation until 1953. The community was so named on account of orchards near the original town site.
