= Farmer Wants a Wife (American TV series) =

American reality TV show

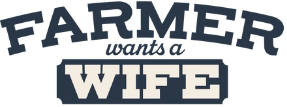
- Genre: Reality
- Presented by: Jennifer Nettles; Kimberly Williams-Paisley
- Country of origin: United States
- Original language: English
- No. of seasons: 1 (The CW); 4 (Fox)
- No. of episodes: 8 (The CW); 44 (Fox)

Production
- Executive producers: Adam Cohen (2008); Cara Tapper (2008); Cecile Frot-Coutaz (2008); Joanna Vernetti (2008); Chris Culvenor (2023–present); David Emery (2023–present); David Tibballs (2023–present); Eden Gaha (2023–present); Lauren Taylor Harding (2023–present); Paul Franklin (2023–present)
- Production locations: St. Charles, Orchard Farm, and Portage des Sioux
- Production companies: FremantleMedia North America (2008); Super Delicious Productions (2008); Eureka Productions (2023–present)

Original release
- Network: The CW
- Release: April 30 – June 25, 2008
- Network: Fox
- Release: March 8, 2023 – present

Farmer Wants a Wife is an American reality television series, that is based on the British show of the same name, in which a bachelor farmer is searching for a wife among a group of 10 single city women.

The series first aired on The CW from April 30 to June 25, 2008.

The first American season consisted of 8 episodes, during which 10 women are trying to be chosen by a bachelor farmer. In that the format differed from the other international versions. Shooting locations in the United States were St. Charles, Orchard Farm, and Portage des Sioux, all in Missouri.

In 2022, it was announced that the series would be revived, with the first series of the revival premiering on Fox in March 2023, with country music singer Jennifer Nettles serving as the host.

== The CW ==
=== The Farmer ===
Biographical data from The CW unless otherwise noted.

Name	Age	Hometown	Occupation
Matt Neustadt	29	West Alton, Missouri	Farmer

=== The City Women ===
Biographical data from The CW unless otherwise noted.

Name	Age	Hometown	Occupation	Outcome
Brooke Ward	22	Atlanta, Texas	Marketing Representative	Winner
Christa Ackerman	21	New York City, New York	Cocktail Waitress	Runner-Up
Amanda Tudesco	21	Poughkeepsie, New York	Northwestern University Student	Episode 7
Kanisha Johnson	25	Ontario, California	Leasing Agent	Episode 7
Ashley Wochholz	27	Chicago, Illinois	Senior Catering Sales Manager	Episode 6
Lisa Lewolt	21	Los Angeles, California	Street Performer	Episode 5
Stacey Feldman	24	Owings Mills, Maryland	Public Relations Agent	Episode 4
Krista Krogman	23	Kelley, Iowa	Accountant	Episode 3
Josie Goldberg	24	Laguna Niguel, California	Math and Tennis Teacher	Episode 2
Stephanie Horn	23	Los Angeles, California	Jeweler	Episode 1

=== Episode summaries ===
==== "Goodbye City...Hello Country" ====
Original Airdate: April 30, 2008 Ten young women arrive at the farm to meet Matt, who takes them to see the chickens, revealing Stephanie's secret fear of them. Matt's mom takes them around the house, where Josie is openly disgusted by the 19th Century style. Matt announces that his neighbor needs a hand collecting chickens. Upon arrival Matt announces that this is going to be the first challenge. Kanisha and Krista tied with 10 chickens each, and have a "coop off". Kanisha finally wins with 14 chickens. Josie collects none, saying that it is beneath her, while Stephanie gets four, overcoming her fear of chickens.

Matt invites everyone for a hayride around the countryside. He asks Stephanie and Josie if they really want to be a farmer's wife. During the ride, Josie's reply provokes the requisite argument between the girls and when they return she and Kanisha have an argument.

The girls prepare for the elimination and arguments continue between the other girls and Josie. Matt asks the girls (excluding Kanisha because she won the challenge) to stand behind a chicken with their name on it. Whoever's chicken does not have an egg underneath it is eliminated. Stephanie is ultimately eliminated because she did not fit in.

Matt decides to spend some alone time with one of the girls and picks Christa to go with him. The girls help her prepare for her date with Matt. He brings her to a small canopy and a bench and they talk. Lisa, Brooke and Amanda toilet paper Matt's truck but are caught by him and Christa. She is outraged because they ruined her "almost perfect" date and more arguments arise.

- Challenge: Collecting Chickens
- Challenge Winner: Kanisha
- Chosen For Date: Christa
- Date: Talking on a small bench, under a canopy, and drinking
- Elimination: Finding an egg
- Eliminated: Stephanie

==== "Pigs & Cows & Sheep...Oh My" ====
Original Airdate: May 7, 2008 A romantic date between Matt and Stacey leads to some juicy gossip that is news to Matt. Back at the farm, Stacey and Lisa show their true colors around the pigs, and Matt takes the girls out for a wild night of bingo. At bingo, Josie insults the local bingo players; Matt smooths things over, but the group is embarrassed by Josie's attitude. At the local bar, Lisa and Brooke become "friendly" to the other local farmers, which causes Christa and the other girls to think that they are not interested in Matt, and are on the show for the wrong reasons. Josie is devastated about being eliminated, and refuses to leave. She makes a big scene demanding a "parting gift" from Matt. She finally leaves - without a gift.

- Challenge: Steve's Chores (Milk Goats, Spray Paint Cows and Clean Stalls)
- Challenge Winner: Krista
- Chosen For Date: Stacey
- Date: Watching a home movie
- Elimination: Bingo
- Eliminated: Josie

==== "Wet 'n Wild" ====
Original Airdate: May 14, 2008

- Challenge: Driving a tractor across a field and throwing hay bales into a trailer.
- Challenge Winner: Brooke
- Chosen For Date: Amanda
- Date: Dinner with Matt's Family
- Elimination: Stitching Name
- Eliminated: Krista

==== "Do-Si-Do" ====
Original Airdate: May 28, 2008

- Challenge: Collecting Sweet Corn (3 x 2 dozen)
- Challenge Winner: Brooke
- Chosen For Date: Kanisha
- Date: Horse back riding and watching a sunset
- Elimination: Pouring a drink
- Eliminated: Stacey

==== "As Country as Apple Pie" ====
Original Airdate: June 4, 2008

- Challenge: Baking an apple pie
- Challenge Winner: Amanda
- Chosen For Date: Ashley
- Date: Mother in Law House Restaurant
- Elimination: Name in lights (fireworks display)
- Eliminated: Lisa

==== "It's Show Time" ====
Original Airdate: June 11, 2008

- Challenge: Talent Show
- Challenge Winner: Brooke
- Chosen For Date: Brooke
- Date: Boating and picnic on lake
- Elimination: Reaching inside of a cow's rectum to see if cow is pregnant
- Eliminated: Ashley

==== "A Family Affair" ====
Original Airdate: June 18, 2008

- Challenge: None
- Challenge Winner: None
- Chosen For Date: Brooke & Christa
- Date: Hot tub
- Elimination: Firing at a Target w/ a Shotgun
- Eliminated: Kanisha & Amanda

==== "Farmer Picks a Wife" ====
Original Airdate: June 25, 2008

- Challenge: None
- Challenge Winner: None
- Chosen For Date: Brooke and Christa
- Date: Brooke on a four-wheeler to a picnic, Christa on a Horse Carriage to Matt's house
- Elimination: Crop Duster With Banner
- Eliminated: Christa

=== Elimination chart ===
Contestants	1	2	3	4	5	6	7	8
Date	Christa	Stacey	Amanda	Kanisha	Ashley	Brooke	Brooke, Christa	Brooke, Christa
Brooke			Challenge; Winner	Challenge; Winner		Challenge; Winner		Winner (Episode 8)
Christa								Runner-up (Episode 8)
Amanda					Challenge; Winner		Btm 2	Eliminated (Episode 7)
Kanisha	Challenge; Winner					Btm 2	Btm 2	Eliminated (Episode 7)
Ashley					Btm 2	Btm 2	Eliminated (Episode 6)	
Lisa		Btm 2	Btm 2	Btm 2	Btm 2	Eliminated (Episode 5)		
Stacey				Btm 2	Eliminated (Episode 4)			
Krista		Challenge; Winner	Btm 2	Eliminated (Episode 3)				
Josie	Btm 2	Btm 2	Eliminated (Episode 2)					
Stephanie	Btm 2	Eliminated (Episode 1)						

== Fox ==
In September 2022, Fox ordered a reboot of the series, produced by Eureka Productions. Hosted by Jennifer Nettles, it premiered on March 8, 2023. In May 2023, the series was renewed for a second season, which premiered on February 1, 2024. In January 2025, the series was renewed for a third season, which premiered on March 20, 2025, with actress Kimberly Williams-Paisley replacing Nettles as host. The fourth season premiered on April 21, 2026.

=== Season 1 (2023) ===
Original run	Farmer	Profile	Winner	Runner(s)-up	Still Together	Notes
March 8 – May 17, 2023	Allen Foster	Age: 32; Location: Williamsport, Tennessee; Profession: Cattle Rancher	Khelsi Stone	Rebecca Rosell	No	Foster and Stone announced their breakup on May 19, 2023.
March 8 – May 17, 2023	Hunter Grayson	Age: 31; Location: Watkinsville, Georgia; Profession: Cattle and Horse Rancher	Meghan Baker	Sydney Groom	No	Grayson and Baker announced their breakup on June 20, 2023.
March 8 – May 17, 2023	Landon Heaton	Age: 35; Location: Alva, Oklahoma; Profession: Cattle Rancher and Farmer	Ashley Larea	Ashley Rader	No	Heaton and Larea announced their breakup on June 1, 2023.
March 8 – May 17, 2023	Ryan Black	Age: 32; Location: Shelby, North Carolina; Profession: Horse Trainer and Breeder	—N/a	Haley Ramirez; Sara Vincent	No	Black asked Ramirez - whom he had previously eliminated earlier in the season - to pursue a relationship, but she said no.

=== Season 2 (2024) ===
Original run	Farmer	Profile	Winner	Runner(s)-up	Still Together	Notes
February 1 – May 16, 2024	Brandon Rogers	Age: 29; Location: Center, Colorado; Profession: Potato and Barley Farmer	Grace Girard	Emerson Sears	No	During the reunion special, Rogers and Girard announced that they are no longer together.
February 1 – May 16, 2024	Mitchell Kolinsky	Age: 27; Location: Mount Juliet, Tennessee; Profession: First Generation Farmer	Sydney Errera	Kait Smith	No	Kolinsky and Errera broke up in February 2026.
February 1 – May 16, 2024	Nathan Smothers	Age: 23; Location: Bartow, Florida; Profession: Citrus and Cattle Farmer	Taylor Bedell	Allye Wright	No	Smothers and Bedell broke up in August 2025.
February 1 – May 16, 2024	Ty Ferrell	Age: 42; Location: Sikeston, Missouri; Profession: Team Roper	—N/a	Megan Lay; Melody Fernandez	No	In the Final Decisions, Ferrell opted not to pursue a relationship with either Lay or Fernandez.

=== Season 3 (2025) ===
Original run	Farmer	Profile	Winner	Runner(s)-up	Still Together	Notes
March 20 – May 22, 2025	Colton Hendricks	Age: 28; Location: Mena, Arkansas; Profession: Cattle Rancher & Horse Trainer	Zoe Green	Keeley Goldberg	No	Hendricks and Green announced their breakup shortly after the finale aired.
March 20 – May 22, 2025	Jay Woods	Age: 25; Location: Florence, Alabama; Profession: Hay and Cattle Farmer	Grace Clark	Karina Sabol	No	Woods and Clark announced their breakup shortly after the finale aired.
March 20 – May 22, 2025	John Sansone	Age: 25; Location: St. Louis, Missouri; Profession: Soy, Corn and Wheat Farmer	Claire Dirette	Lily Ayres	No	Sansone and Dirette announced their breakup on August 18, 2025.
March 20 – May 22, 2025	Matt Warren	Age: 30; Location: Morro Bay, California; Profession: Avocado and Exotic Fruit Farmer	Chelsi Davis	Jordyn Belcher	No	Warren and Davis broke up in summer 2025.

=== Season 4 (2026) ===
Original run	Farmer	Profile	Winner	Runner(s)-up	Still Together	Notes
April 21, 2026 – June 9, 2026	Braden Pridemore	Age: 26; Location: Homer, Illinois; Profession: 5th Generation Corn & Soybean Farmer	Casey Riemer	Brittney Graham	Yes	Pridemore and Reimer are still together as of June 2026.
April 21, 2026 – June 9, 2026	Brett Maverick	Age: 35; Location: Savannah, Tennessee; Profession: Horse & Cattle Farmer	Quinn Gutermann	Hanna Carpenter	Yes	Maverick and Gutermann are still together as of June 2026.
April 21, 2026 – June 9, 2026	Sean Cavanaugh	Age: 22; Location: Solvang, California; Profession: Farm-To-Table Produce Farmer	Emily Rushnell	Carson Higgins	Yes	Cavanaugh and Rushnell are still together as of June 2026.

== Ratings ==
=== The CW ===
Viewership and ratings per episode of Farmer Wants a Wife
No.	Title	Air date	Rating/share (18–49)	Viewers (millions)	Ref.
1	"Goodbye City...Hello Country"	April 30, 2008	1.7/3	2.4	
2	"Pigs & Cows & Sheep...Oh My"	May 7, 2008	1.5/2	2.1	
3	"Wet 'n Wild"	May 14, 2008	1.3/2	2.0	
4	"Do-Si-Do"	May 28, 2008	1.6/3	—N/a	
5	"As Country as Apple Pie"	June 4, 2008	1.3/2	2.0	
6	"It's Show Time"	June 11, 2008	1.3/2	2.0	
7	"A Family Affair"	June 18, 2008	1.3/3	2.0	
8	"Farmer Picks a Wife"	June 25, 2008	1.6/3	2.5	

=== Fox ===
==== Season 1 ====
Viewership and ratings per episode of Farmer Wants a Wife
No.	Title	Air date	Rating/share (18–49)	Viewers (millions)	Ref.
1	"Welcome to the Farms"	March 8, 2023	0.4/3	2.46	
2	"Down & Dirty on the Farm"	March 15, 2023	0.4/3	2.28	
3	"Why Won't He Kiss Miss"	March 22, 2023	0.2/2	1.97	
4	"You Can't Have Your Cake & Eat it Too"	March 29, 2023	0.3/2	2.08	
5	"Tears, Tantrums and Tailgates"	April 5, 2023	0.3/3	1.96	
6	"An Emotional Goodbye"	April 12, 2023	0.2/2	2.03	
7	"Barn Dance Romance"	April 19, 2023	0.3/2	2.12	
8	"Is There Room for One More?"	April 26, 2023	0.3/2	2.17	
9	"Meet the Families"	May 3, 2023	0.3/2	2.06	
10	"I've Made a Mistake"	May 10, 2023	0.3/2	2.12	
11	"The Final Decisions"	May 17, 2023	0.3/2	2.25	

==== Season 2 ====
Viewership and ratings per episode of Farmer Wants a Wife
No.	Title	Air date	Rating/share (18–49)	Viewers (millions)	Ref.
1	"Meet the New Farmers!"	February 1, 2024	0.3/3	1.99	
2	"Welcome to the Farms"	February 8, 2024	0.2/2	1.83	
3	"Tailgates and Tantrums"	February 15, 2024	0.2/3	1.77	
4	"You Need to Step up Your Flirting Game"	February 22, 2024	0.2/2	1.59	
5	"Steers, Fears and Tears"	February 29, 2024	0.2/2	1.86	
6	"Temptation Strolls into Town"	March 14, 2024	0.2/2	1.82	
7	"Should I Stay or Should I Go?"	March 28, 2024	0.2/2	1.70	
8	"Some Needs to Go Home"	April 4, 2024	0.2/2	1.81	
9	"Farmers' Family Dinner"	April 11, 2024	0.2/2	1.73	
10	"Final Solo Dates"	April 18, 2024	0.3/3	2.04	
11	"Family City Visits Part 1"	April 25, 2024	0.2/2	1.81	
12	"Family City Visits Part 2"	May 2, 2024	0.2/2	1.86	
13	"The Final Decisions"	May 9, 2024	0.2/2	2.03	
14	"The Reunion"	May 16, 2024	0.2/2	1.74	

==== Season 3 ====
Viewership and ratings per episode of Farmer Wants a Wife
No.	Title	Air date	Timeslot (ET)	Rating/share (18–49)	Viewers (millions)	Ref.
1	"DTF? Down to Farm?"	March 20, 2025	Thursday 9:00 p.m.	0.2/2	1.50	
2	"We're Coming to Date Our Man"	March 27, 2025	Thursday 9:00 p.m.	0.2/2	1.53	
3	"Meet the Friends"	April 3, 2025	Thursday 9:00 p.m.	0.2/3	1.53	
4	"You Can't Pick All 5"	April 10, 2025	Thursday 9:00 p.m.	0.2/3	1.50	
5	"I'm Gonna Miss You, Cowboy"	April 17, 2025	Thursday 9:00 p.m.	0.2/3	1.44	
6	"Mamma Knows Best"	April 24, 2025	Thursday 9:00 p.m.	0.2/2	1.53	
7	"Let's Go Camping"	May 1, 2025	Thursday 9:00 p.m.	0.1/2	1.41	
8	"The Last Solo Dates"	May 8, 2025	Thursday 9:00 p.m.	0.2/2	1.46	
9	"Meet the Families Part 1"	May 15, 2025	Thursday 9:00 p.m.	0.2/2	1.51	
10	"Meet the Families Part 2"	May 22, 2025	Thursday 8:00 p.m.	0.1	1.66	
11	"Final Decisions"	May 22, 2025	Thursday 9:00 p.m.	0.1	1.66	

==== Season 4 ====
Viewership and ratings per episode of Farmer Wants a Wife
No.	Title	Air date	Rating/share (18–49)	Viewers (millions)	Ref.
1	"Can I Meet a Different Farmer?"	April 21, 2026	TBD	TBD	
2	"Ladies Coming in Hot!"	April 28, 2026	TBD	TBD	
3	"Thank God She's Not Blonde"	May 5, 2026	TBD	TBD	
4	"A Kiss Changes Everything"	May 12, 2026	TBD	TBD	
5	"A Rumor Rocks the Farm"	May 19, 2026	TBD	TBD	
6	"'Steamy' Romantic"	May 26, 2026	TBD	TBD	
7	"I'm Falling For You"	June 2, 2026	TBD	TBD	
8	"Final Decisions: It's Always Been You"	June 9, 2026	TBD	TBD	
