= 2018 in American television =

In American television in 2018, notable events included television show finales, cancellations, and information about controversies and carriage disputes.

== Notable events ==
=== January ===
Date	Event	Source
1	Starz and its related channels (including Starz Encore and Movieplex) are removed from Altice USA-owned cable systems, including Optimum and Suddenlink. The removal of the premium services follows "numerous attempts" between Altice and Starz parent Lionsgate to secure a new carriage agreement. In a statement, Altice representatives said that it did not make sense to charge a high fee to its subscribers to carry Starz and its sister channels as the network maintains a standalone over-the-top streaming service, particularly because "their viewership is declining and the majority of our customers don't watch Starz." The dispute ends on February 13 after Starz Inc. and Altice come to a new agreement, though the networks returned a month later, on March 1 (over-the-top access to the Starz website and apps was returned for the interim period).	
1	Frontier Communications drops CBS affiliate KIRO-TV/Seattle from its Frontier FiOS systems in western Washington state, after failing to reach a new carriage agreement with KIRO parent Cox Media Group. Frontier representatives stated that Cox Media was asking for the provider to increase its carriage fees for the station's main feed and its GetTV- and Laff-affiliated subchannels by more than 80% over the next three-year contractual period.	
1	NuLink (a cable provider owned by WideOpenWest) drops the Meredith Corporation-owned duopoly of CBS affiliate WGCL-TV and independent station WPCH-TV from its systems in five Atlanta-area suburbs, after the two parties failed to agree on terms to renew the stations' contract.	
2	NBC News announces that Hoda Kotb will assume the weekday co-anchor chair of Today permanently with Savannah Guthrie, filling the seat held by Matt Lauer before his November 29 termination from the network due to inappropriate sexual behavior, and after a month where Today exceeded ratings expectations despite Kotb's previous interim status. Though not the first time two women have headed an American morning program (Robin Roberts and Diane Sawyer co-hosted ABC's Good Morning America from 2006 to 2009), it is the first time two women are the leading hosts for Today. Kotb will also continue to host the lighter 10:00 a.m. Today hour with Kathie Lee Gifford.	
3	CBS News fires political director Steve Chaggaris, after allegations of past "inappropriate behavior" were disclosed to division management over the prior two weeks. Neither the nature nor extent of the allegations against Chaggaris – who joined CBS in 1999, and was appointed as its senior political editor upon returning to the network following a two-year hiatus in 2010, before being promoted to political director in March 2017 – were disclosed.	
4	Production on Jeopardy! is placed on temporary hiatus while host Alex Trebek recuperates from a successful December 16, 2017, surgery at Los Angeles's Cedars-Sinai Medical Center to remove a subdural hematoma that formed as a complication from a minor head injury he suffered in a fall that October. Trebek resumed taping of the syndicated game show in mid-January, though because of the show's advanced taping schedule, his medical leave only marginally affected the show's broadcast schedule: the annual Jeopardy! College Championship, which was originally scheduled to have all ten episodes tape during the first week of January, instead filmed in March (one month before the episodes begin airing during the first week of the May sweeps period).	
6	After nine years in the role, Jon Gruden covers his last game as color analyst for Monday Night Football during an AFC wild card game between the Tennessee Titans and the Kansas City Chiefs broadcast on ESPN and ABC. Gruden, who was hired by ESPN in May 2009 as color analyst for the weekly NFL game broadcasts, leaves the booth to return to the coaching ranks as head coach of the Oakland Raiders for the 2018 season.	
7	Fed up with not getting any answers and a lot of deflection while he was questioning him about whether President Donald Trump met with Russian operatives after his son, Donald Trump Jr., got together with them in the infamous June 2016 meeting at Trump Tower, as well as claims journalist Michael Wolff made in his just-released book Fire and Fury: Inside the Trump White House about his fitness and stability, including quotes made by former White House chief strategist Steve Bannon about his feelings towards Trump, only to start dismissing it as "a pure work of fiction" and "nothing but a pile of trash through and through," which in turn lead into a slamming of CNN for making "condescending" and "snide" remarks and airing "24 hours of negative, anti-Trump, hysterical coverage" upon praising his boss as a "political genius," State of the Union host Jake Tapper tells White House aide Stephen Miller that "I think I have wasted enough of my viewers' time," and abruptly ended the interview immediately, believing that Miller was taking cues from Trump that Tapper was unimpressed with.	
7	The 75th Golden Globe Awards are broadcast on NBC, with Seth Meyers as host. The sexual harassment controversies that began in 2017 are the main topic of discussion, as several (primarily) female celebrities help evolve the Me Too movement into Time's Up, a legal defense fund supporting lower-income women seeking justice for workplace sexual harassment and sexual assault. Big Little Lies (with four awards), The Handmaid's Tale and The Marvelous Mrs. Maisel (with two awards each) are the major winners among television nominees, while Three Billboards Outside Ebbing, Missouri (with four awards), Lady Bird and The Shape of Water (with two awards each) are the big winners among film nominees.	
8	The Federal Communications Commission begins the elimination on this date of the Main Studio Rule; the long-standing rule had required television and radio stations to maintain a physical studio 25 miles within its city of license, have it staffed during normal business hours, and have capabilities for program origination.	
10	John Dickerson becomes the new co-anchor of CBS This Morning (joining existing co-anchors Gayle King and Norah O'Donnell), one day after CBS News taps him to succeeded Charlie Rose, who was fired in October 2017 following amid accusations of inappropriate sexual behavior with several female employees of his former PBS talk show. Dickerson – who will relocate full-time from Washington, D.C., to New York City with the promotion – will transition out of his position as moderator of Face the Nation, a role he assumed in June 2015. On February 22, it is announced Margaret Brennan will assume the permanent moderator of Face the Nation succeed by Dickerson, though he returns to that position in September on a temporary basis during Brennan's maternity leave.	
11	The Sports Fans Coalition launches Locast, a streaming service offering access to 15 local broadcast stations – including CBS owned-and-operated station WCBS-TV, NBC O&O WNBC, Fox O&O WNYW, ABC O&O WABC-TV and CW affiliate WPIX – to viewers residing within New York City's five boroughs. Co-founder David Goodfriend contends that, unlike defunct subscription service Aereo (which ceased operations after a 2014 Supreme Court case that found that Aereo retransmitted stations in infringement of copyright law), Locast's nonprofit business model – which relies on individual donations to support operational costs, in order to maintain free access to program streams – permits it to retransmit broadcast signals without prior approval of television stations or their corporate parents under copyright exemptions that have existed since the 1970s.	
12	In a memo sent to company employees, Charter Communications CEO Tom Rutledge announces that its Spectrum News unit of 24-hour local cable news channels will expand to include networks in five additional markets served by the cable television provider – Los Angeles, Ohio, Kentucky (likely an expansion of its existing news channel in that state), Wisconsin and Kansas City – during 2018.	
15	The 49th NAACP Image Awards are aired on TV One.	
18	Seven members of the Endemol Shine Group, which contracts with CNBC to produce Staten Island Hustle, are arrested at Newark Liberty International Airport for attempting to put through airport security a prototype piece of rolling 'vacuum compression' luggage which had the look on first glance of an improvised explosive device, during their filming. The Transportation Security Administration determined later it was not a threat, but the crew will face possible penalties for the inconvenience.	
19	Kaye Switzer and the holders of the trust of the late Sandi Spreckman file a breach of contract lawsuit against Judy Sheindlin and CBS Corporation (along with subsidiaries CBS Television Studios and Big Ticket Television) for unspecified damages. The seven-count filing alleges that the plaintiffs (who co-created the syndicated court show in 1996) are owed $4.75 million in compensation through the August 2017 sale of the episode library of Judge Judy (which Sheindlin acquired for $95 million) per a clause in the five-season contract renewal reached with Big Ticket and CBS in March 2015, that stated that Switzer and the Spreckman estate were subject to compensation through the transfer of the episode library to Sheindlin and re-sold the library in violation of the contract.	
19	Authorities in Novi, Michigan, arrest a man for making a series of threatening calls to CNN. Brandon Griesemer, who was charged in U.S. District Court with transmitting interstate communications with the intent to extort and threat to injure, allegedly made 22 calls to CNN on January 9–10, several of which contained disparaging statements about minorities and claims of "fake news" by CNN, as well as a threat to kill employees at CNN's Atlanta headquarters. If convicted, Greisemer could face a fine or a prison term. The news of Griesemer's arrest calls attention to critics' concerns about the risk of threats and acts of violence against journalists with CNN and other news organizations by some of President Donald Trump's most fervent supporters amid his repeated criticism of the Time Warner-owned cable network. Network sources stated that threats against CNN personnel have increased since Trump's criticism of CNN began during his 2016 Presidential campaign.	
23	ESPN announces that Matt Vasgersian and Alex Rodriguez will join the broadcast team of Sunday Night Baseball for the 2018 season, succeeding Dan Shulman and Aaron Boone respectively. Boone was hired as manager of the New York Yankees in December 2017. Under Rodriguez's agreement with ESPN, the former shortstop and third baseman will remain an analyst for Fox Sports's postseason coverage, and will make guest appearances on the ESPN morning program Get Up which would premiere in April. Likewise, Vasgersian will retain his position with MLB Network as a host and announcer.	
23	Hero Broadcasting announces it will sell América Tevé affiliate KMOH-TV/Kingman, Arizona, and its Phoenix translator KEJR-LD to HC2 Holdings for $2.7 million, pending FCC approval.	
26	After nearly a year as co-anchor of the 6:00 p.m. (ET) edition of ESPN's SportsCenter, Jemele Hill announces that she will step down from that position on February 2 to join its sister website The Undefeated and to focus on special assignments she feels more tailored for; however, Hill will remain with the network as she still has three years left on a four-year contract. Her partner Michael Smith would continue to anchor the program solo until March 9. Two months later, Sage Steele and Kevin Negandhi were reported to be the new anchors for the hour.	
28	The 60th Annual Grammy Awards aired live on CBS, from Madison Square Garden in New York after fifteen consecutive years at Staples Center in Los Angeles; however, because of disputes over the handling of future events, the National Academy of Recording Arts and Sciences have announced that it will return to Los Angeles for the 2019 Awards and beyond.	
29	Entertainment One purchases the 49% in The Mark Gordon Company that it did not already own for $209 million, as part of a deal that will also see Gordon – whose television productions include ongoing series such as Grey's Anatomy, Quantico, Designated Survivor and Criminal Minds – become chief content officer of the Toronto-based entertainment distributor (Gordon and newly appointed company president Steve Bertram will succeed longtime president John Moryaniss, who will step down from the post following a transitional period).	
29	Ten years after the network dropped the name in a de-emphasis of its former 24-hour rolling news format, HLN reinstates the "Headline News" moniker into its on-air branding (albeit on a secondary basis), which is featured prominently on-air during the network's 6:00 a.m. to 12:00 p.m. (Eastern Time) lineup. The move coincides with the addition of "Headlines Now," a 90-second segment summarizing the day's top stories that airs at the top and bottom of each hour between 11:00 a.m. to 5:00 p.m. ET.	
29	Production on A&E's upcoming home improvement series Home Rescue is suspended after one of its regulars, Christopher Dionne, is arrested in California after he was accused of molesting a 10-year-old girl, including taking photos of her chest and allowing her to touch him inappropriately during a party he went to in Old Lyme, Connecticut, in November 2017.	
30	Hours after Donald Trump gave his first State of the Union address, Stephanie Clifford (known by her stage name Stormy Daniels), a former adult film star who is alleged to have had an affair with the President, sat down for an interview with Jimmy Kimmel on his ABC talk show. This was Daniels's first appearance on a late night program since The Wall Street Journal reported that Trump's lawyer, Michael Cohen, paid her $130,000 to keep quiet about the details. As she had done during an interview with Inside Edition the week prior, Daniels avoided directly answering or coyly dodged questions about the alleged affair, but did imply that she did not write a statement released that afternoon – claiming to be from her – which strongly refuted the allegations. On February 14, Daniels announces that she will start telling her story after the lawyer admitted to having paid off the money out of his own pocket, thus violating the non-disclosure agreement.	
30	The Trinity Broadcasting Network announces it will acquire independent station WDVB-CD/Edison, New Jersey (located within the New York City market) and Youtoo America affiliate WLPD-CD/Chicago from LocusPoint Networks for $13 million. The sale of the low-power stations extends existing channel sharing agreements with TBN owned-and-operated stations WWTO-TV/Naperville, Illinois, and WTBY-TV/Jersey City that were established in November 2017.	
31	Fox reaches an agreement with the National Football League to acquire the broadcast television rights to Thursday Night Football, assuming the contractual rights from CBS and NBC (both of which had shared the rights for the past two seasons), in a deal estimated to be around $550 million (a $150 million increase from the combined fee that NBC and CBS had been paying). The five-year deal, which expands the network's relationship with the NFL (it already holds rights to preseason, Sunday afternoon regular season, and select playoff games, primarily involving teams in the National Football Conference), will give Fox and Fox Deportes rights to simulcast eleven NFL Network-produced games in prime time between Weeks 4 and 15 of the regular season through 2022.	

=== February ===
Date	Event	Source
1	Twelve years after splitting into two separate companies, the boards for CBS Corporation and Viacom announce their intent to explore a potential remerger. The study will be conducted at the behest of Shari Redstone, president of National Amusements, which holds controlling interest in both Viacom and CBS. It comes at a time when the media landscape faces changes with the still-pending merger between AT&T and Time Warner, plus the planned takeover by The Walt Disney Company of 21st Century Fox's entertainment assets.	
1	NBC affiliates WVIR-TV/Charlottesville, Virginia, and WBBH-TV/Fort Myers, Florida (along with WBBH's sister ABC affiliate WZVN-TV/Naples) are removed from Dish Network, after the satellite provider and the parent company of the two stations, Waterman Broadcasting, fail to reach an agreement on retransmission fees. The dispute ended two days later on February 3, the day prior to NBC's broadcast of Super Bowl LII, when Dish and Waterman reached a multi-year carriage agreement for the stations.	
1	Independent station KAZT-TV/Prescott, Arizona, is also removed by Dish Network, after the provider and KAZT owner Londen Media Group failed to agree on retransmission terms during carriage agreement negotiations, along with Dish declining an offer by Londen to carry the station's MeTV-affiliated DT2 subchannel at no additional charge. In response to a statement by Dish suggesting that KAZT's parent company did not respond to repeated attempts to secure a deal, Londen Media CEO Lynn Londen contended that the company rescinded its offer to carry KAZT-DT2 after experiencing resistance from Dish management and that it was not demanding a rate increase to carry KAZT, stating "We are going at zero fees, asking for zero fees."	
2	Beth Holloway – whose daughter, Natalee Holloway, disappeared during a trip to Aruba in 2005 – sues Oxygen Media and Brian Graden Media for $35 million, over what she calls misleading statements that were made during the production of The Disappearance of Natalee Holloway, a six-part documentary that aired on Oxygen in August 2017. Beth's complaint stated that the special was a "pre-planned farce" and "not a realtime or legitimate investigation into new leads" as claimed, and claims that she was duped into providing DNA for testing against remains found by producers, without informing her of its use for a television program. An Oxygen representative stated that the complaint painted an "inaccurate depiction of how the series was produced," and was developed in collaboration with Beth's ex-husband, Dave Holloway, and a private investigator he hired based on a lead he had received.	
3	Effective on this date, YouTube begins labeling "state-sponsored" content on news and reporting from government-run or funded broadcasters as part of an effort to filter out fake news and fabricated stories that could be viewed as propaganda. The label will appear below the video and above its title, as well as a link to the broadcaster's Wikipedia page. The move has been criticized for including PBS among those that will be listed because of it being a non-commercial network – despite operating independently of the U.S. government – as it only receives a small portion of federal funding and its member stations are made up of nonprofit organizations, schools, universities, and local/state governments. A PBS spokesperson called the move "vague and misleading," and said that the public broadcaster is working out a deal to rectify the situation.	
3	Charter Communications ceases carriage of eleven television stations owned by Northwest Broadcasting and its subsidiaries in six markets – Yuma–El Centro (CBS affiliate KSWT and NBC affiliate KYMA-DT), Spokane (Fox affiliate KAYU-TV), Syracuse (Fox affiliate WSYT), Idaho Falls (NBC affiliate KPVI-DT), Yakima (Fox affiliate KFFX-TV), Eureka (NBC affiliate KIEM-TV and CBS affiliate KJRW), Binghamton (Fox affiliate WICZ-TV), and Medford (Fox affiliate KMVU-DT) – over a disagreement during negotiations of a new distribution contract over carriage fees for the stations.	
4	Super Bowl LII, which saw the Philadelphia Eagles defeat the New England Patriots 41–33 at U.S. Bank Stadium in Minneapolis, Minnesota, aired on NBC in English and Universo in Spanish. The game – watched by an estimated 103.4 million viewers (a 7% decline from the previous year), making it the lowest-rated Super Bowl telecast since 2009's Super Bowl XLIII (which was watched by 98.7 million viewers) – marked the Eagles' first Super Bowl championship win and their fourth national championship in franchise history. Justin Timberlake headlined the halftime show, performing a medley of his own hit songs as well as Prince's "I Would Die 4 U", a tribute that was criticized by the late singer's fans for using a sheet projecting footage from Purple Rain of Prince (who objected to the use of digital editing to include a deceased artist into a performance) performing the 1984 hit, and because of Timberlake's past critical remarks about him. The performance marked Timberlake's third Super Bowl halftime appearance and his first since the incident at Super Bowl XXXVIII, in which he accidentally exposed Janet Jackson's right breast on-air during their performance of Timberlake's "Rock Your Body". The telecast was also subject to a control room equipment failure during the second quarter, in which viewers saw a black screen for about 30 seconds during a commercial break. (Representatives with NBC Sports stated that the error did not result in any loss of advertising revenue and implied that said break was likely intended to consist of network promotions.)	
4	The Super Bowl LII telecast was followed by a lead-out episode of This Is Us titled "Super Bowl Sunday", in which the fate of Jack Pearson (Milo Ventimiglia) was revealed as a sudden death from a "widowmaker" heart attack caused by smoke inhalation. The episode was watched by 26.97 million viewers, making it the highest-rated post-Super Bowl entertainment program since NBC's airing of the second-season premiere of The Voice in 2012, and the highest-rated episode of This is Us to date. Later that night, The Tonight Show Starring Jimmy Fallon aired a special live episode from The Orpheum Theater in Minneapolis with the cast of This Is Us, Dwayne Johnson, and a pair of performances by Timberlake, one featuring Chris Stapleton.	
4	On the same day as the telecast, a commercial for Fiat Chrysler Automobiles' Ram Trucks utilizing Martin Luther King Jr.'s iconic – and final – sermon from 1968, "The Drum Major Instinct" speech airs (the speech also marked the 50th anniversary on this date as well). The ad became the subject of controversy over the images of only one African American used in the scene, along with backlash from viewers, including members from the King Family themselves, as they did not authorize the speech to be used or gave Fiat Chrysler permission to use it (FCA got the permission from a company that holds the IP rights to the King estate). William B. Wachtel, the co-founder of The Drum Major Institute (with Dr. King), stated that the speech "in no way condones the use of Dr. King's sermon for this purpose," adding that King used the speech to target the specific evils that he condemned, which was the exploitation of minorities by advertisers, including the automotive industry.	
5	LeSEA Broadcasting announces that it will sell WHNO/New Orleans, KEEN-CD/Las Vegas and KWHS-LD/Colorado Springs to the Christian Television Network for $5.7 million. The sale was finalized 2 3/4 months later on April 25.	
5	Father and daughter team Kirk and Brooke Spangler of Belfast, New York, win a total of $1,415,098 on the second-season finale episode of The Wall, setting a record for the highest amount of money won by a team of contestants on the NBC game show.	
7	CBS affiliate WHBF-TV/Rock Island, Illinois (Quad Cities) becomes the first local television station in the United States to employ a full-time reporter of Muslim American descent and the first American television reporter to regularly appear on-air wearing a hijab, with the promotion of Tahera Rahman (who joined WHBF as a newscast producer in May 2016) to the station's reporting staff.	
7–25	The 2018 Winter Olympics in Pyeongchang, South Korea airs on NBC and its cable networks. Norway finished first in the medal table, winning 39 total medals (including 14 gold and silver medals each, and 11 bronzes); the United States finished fourth, with 23 medals (nine gold, eight silver and six bronze, with alpine skier Mikaela Shiffrin, snowboarders Shaun White and Chloe Kim, and the U.S. women's ice hockey and the men's curling teams among the major U.S. gold medalists). As the 14-hour time difference with the Eastern Time Zone and the separation of South Korea and the United States by the International Date Line resulted in many events being held during the late morning (KST) taking place during the time period of peak television viewing in the U.S., NBC broadcast Winter Olympic competition live in prime time across all U.S. time zones – instead of a time zone-based tape delay – for the first time. (NBC aired select events held earlier in the day or the day prior on tape delay during its daytime, prime time, and late night coverage.) In addition, NBC stations in the Pacific and/or Mountain time zones carried an additional 30 minutes of event coverage during their respective prime time windows on 13 nights during the Olympics. Coverage began two days earlier than usual (Olympics coverage typically begins with the opening ceremonies, which fell on a Friday, occurring this year on February 9), as the preliminary curling and Alpine skiing competitions – both of which aired on NBCSN – were held on the Wednesday prior to the Opening Ceremony (February 7); NBC began event coverage the following evening (February 8), with the preliminary figure skating and freestyle skiing competitions.	
9	During NBC's coverage of the Winter Olympics opening ceremonies, Katie Couric remarks that the Netherlands' dominance in speed skating (as of 13 February 2018, the country has earned 113 speed skating medals in Olympic competition to date) is attributed to residents using skates as a form of transportation when canals freeze in Amsterdam and other sea-level Dutch communities during the winter. The statement elicited widespread mockery and some backlash on social media (including a Twitter post by the Netherlands U.S. Embassy) as being incorrect and outdated (though the International Olympic Committee does cite that the sport's origins trace to some Dutch residents skating between villages as far back as the 13th century, the mild climate of the European nation precludes the use of skating as present-day transportation). Couric apologized for the comment in a February 13 Twitter post.	
9	Gray Television announces it will acquire MyNetworkTV affiliate KCPM/Grand Forks, North Dakota, from Central Plains Media for $255,000. The purchase will create a triopoly with Gray's existing stations in the Fargo–Grand Forks market, NBC affiliate KVLY-TV and CBS affiliate KXJB-LD. Gray stated that it will upgrade transmitter facilities of KCPM – which will also be assigned new call letters – to extend its coverage throughout the market following the closure of the sale.	
9	YouTube announces the temporary suspension of advertising on content created by website personality Logan Paul, citing a "pattern of behavior" that includes showing the body of a suicide victim in a Japanese forest and applying tasers to deceased rats. Paul's videos are estimated to bring in more than $1 million in monthly income.	
11	Joshua Cooper Ramo is removed from his role as commentator for NBC's Olympics coverage after, while noting during the opening ceremonies in Pyeongchang that Japan occupied Korea from 1910 to 1945, said "but every Korean will tell you that Japan is a cultural and technological and economic example that has been so important to their own transformation." The statement received immediate backlash in South Korea as incorrect, insensitive and ignorant to the host nation's ongoing dispute with Japan. NBC issued an on-air apology for Ramo's remark.	
12	In a release of the 2019 federal budget proposal submitted to Congress, for the second consecutive year, President Donald Trump proposes a two-year plan to eliminate federal funding for the nonprofit Corporation for Public Broadcasting. The administration suggests that the CPB could make up the shortfall by increasing the funding it receives from corporate sponsors, foundations and members, and the outlay to be made up for by private donations and grants at the state level; it also suggests looking at additional alternative programming for PBS, NPR and independent non-commercial broadcasting entities that have grown substantially since CPB was first established in 1967, thus greatly reducing the need for publicly funded programming. PBS president/CEO Paula Kerger responded that "Public broadcasting has earned bipartisan congressional support over the years thanks to the value we provide to taxpayers," adding that the network and its 350 member stations and local supporters "will continue to remind leaders in Washington of the significant benefits the public receives in return for federal funding, a modest investment of about $1.35 per citizen per year."	
12	Gray Television announces that it has reached an agreement to purchase CBS affiliate KGWC-TV/Casper, Wyoming, from Mark III Media for an undisclosed price. The sale – which is expected to be finalized in the second quarter of 2018 – will result in Gray directly acquiring KGWC's intellectual unit (including programming – which will likely be merged into the spectrum of the company's existing Casper property, NBC affiliate KCWY-DT – and administrative operations) as well as the licenses of satellites KGWR-TV/Rock Springs and KGWL-TV/Lander, while the UHF channel 14 license will be donated to a non-profit organization to be determined (which will assign a new call sign and virtual channel number for the station).	
12–23	For the weeks of February 12 and 19 during the Winter Olympics, the fourth hour of Today broadcasts live from 30 Rockefeller Plaza's Studio 6A, sharing the same studio with Megyn Kelly Today. The program's live broadcast, hosted by Kathie Lee Gifford and guest co-host Jenna Bush Hager (filling in for Hoda Kotb, who was on assignment in Pyeongchang, South Korea for the NBC morning program's coverage of the Olympics), features a live studio audience, a weekly guest disc jockey (a similar practice done by syndicated talk show The Ellen DeGeneres Show), and mini bars (including the one with a dumbwaiter system to deliver its trademark drinks to Gifford and Bush Hager). The program returned to Studio 6A on April 6 to celebrate Gifford and Kotb's 10th anniversary as hosts.	
13	In an expansion of its existing television contract with the cable network, Major League Soccer announces a streaming rights agreement with ESPN to provide exclusive coverage of the league's matches on the upcoming ESPN+ over-the-top streaming service, beginning with the 2018 season.	
13	In the first such deal involving a television station and a local professional sports franchise, NBC affiliate KSL-TV/Salt Lake City reaches an over-the-top distribution agreement with Real Salt Lake to stream soccer matches and other VOD content over KSL's website and mobile apps to viewers within Utah, beginning with the 2018 season. The multi-year partnership – which will encompass 90 regular season games involving the Major League Soccer club (starting with the team's March 3 season opener against FC Dallas) and its sister franchises, Utah Royals FC (USL) and Real Monarchs (NWSL), along with Real Salt Lake Academy (DA) matches, pre- and post-match shows, and ancillary team-related programs – will not affect Real Salt Lake's relationship with the market's MyNetworkTV affiliate, KMYU/St. George, as that station is contracted to televise the team's matches through 2020.	
13	Access. 1 Communications files an FCC application announcing the sale of WMGM-LP/Atlantic City, New Jersey, and the construction permit of its low-power digital companion signal – the former of which operates as a translator of Univision Communications-owned Justice Network affiliate WMGM-TV/Wildwood – to Engle Broadcasting LLC for $60,000.	
13	In a follow-up to a February 5 consumer report about a Washington cancer patient that was struggling to pay her medical bills, CBS affiliate KIRO-TV/Seattle announced it and consumer/investigative reporter Jesse Jones (who, himself, is a cancer survivor) spent $12,000 to buy $1 million worth of debt that more than 2,600 residents within the station's viewing area owed to medical providers, with the intent of forwarding the debt to RIP Medical Debt, a Rye, New York-based 501c(3) debt-forgiveness charity that purchases and forgives outstanding medical debt held by U.S. residents.	
15	Following the completion of an internal investigation into allegations of sexual harassment levied against the actor, Amazon Studios formally fires Jeffrey Tambor from the drama series Transparent. In November 2017, Tambor hinted that he will not return in the role as Maura Pfefferman for the show's upcoming fifth season, amidst the allegations made against him by two people, Trace Lysette (who appeared in the recurring role of Shea) and Van Barnes, a transgender cast member who worked as an assistant to Tambor's character on the show.	
15	On her Fox News program The Ingraham Angle, Laura Ingraham responds to anti-Trump comments made by NBA stars LeBron James and Kevin Durant in a video posted to the Uninterrupted website by stating that they need to "shut up and dribble". In her criticism, she pointed to James' turning pro straight out of high school and the fact he "gets paid $100 million a year" to play sports as reasons his opinions are invalid. The comments are criticized by some fellow NBA players and others as being racist, which Ingraham denies. Speaking during media availability for the 2018 NBA All-Star Game, the Cleveland Cavaliers player indicated he will make his views known as he saw fit. James also posted an image on Instagram stating he was "more than an athlete." Ingraham has extended an offer to James to discuss the matter on Fox News.	
18	The 2018 NBA All-Star Game, which took place at the Staples Center in Los Angeles, airs on TNT. The event marked the first year of a new format that supplants the traditional Eastern Conference versus Western Conference format with a draft-style format. The selected teams for the inaugural format were led by "Team LeBron" and "Team Stephen" (both are Akron, Ohio, natives, another first time occurrence), with the former beating the latter 148–145. However, moments before the game, it was Fergie's jazz-styled rendition of "The Star-Spangled Banner" that became the most highlighted – and most commented – event of the game, with the performance as well as attempts by players and spectators at the game trying to control their reactions immediately going viral, with the anthem rendition receiving negative comments on social media outlets. A day later on the 19th, the singer admitted that she "wanted to try something special for the NBA," but it "didn't strike the intended tone."	
21	Wendy Williams confirms during a live broadcast of her syndicated talk show that she has been diagnosed with Graves' disease, an autoimmune disease that affects the thyroid, which also aggravates her hyperthyroidism. On the advice of her doctor, and despite her reluctance of not taking any absences, Williams agreed to take a three-week hiatus from the show in order to receive medical attention and rest, marking the first time in the series' run that she has allowed the show to air repeats for such length of time. Actor Jerry O'Connell substituted for Williams during the week of March 12, marking the first time that a guest host has filled in for Williams, who returned to the show on March 19.	
21	The National Rifle Association's use of a GIF image featuring Parks & Recreation character Leslie Knope in a tweet draws the ire of cast and crew from the show, including Amy Poehler, the actress who played Knope, and series co-creator Michael Schur, who requested the image be taken down. The original message was posted as a thanks to Dana Loesch after she represented the NRA at a CNN town hall with survivors of the Stoneman Douglas High School shooting. On his Twitter account, Schur posted "I would prefer you not use a GIF from a show I worked on to promote your pro-slaughter agenda," and then relayed a request from Poehler to "fuck off."	
21	Big Brother contestants Cody Nickson and Jessica Graf who participated the 19th season last year, emerged victorious on the 30th season of The Amazing Race, making them only the second and third alumnus previously participated in a CBS reality television to win a season in a sister CBS reality programme, with the first being Natalie Anderson in Survivor: San Juan del Sur in 2014. At only eight episodes of airing this season (four being double-leg episodes), it also have the fewest episodes than any other American series for a season with the standard 12-leg format, which was first made permanent in the 15th season.	
22	Sinclair Broadcast Group announces in an FCC divestiture plan that it will spin off stations in smaller markets, sell off three stations (WGN-TV/Chicago, WPIX-TV/New York City and KSWB/San Diego) to different companies that will be operated by Sinclair under an SSA, spin off overlapping and conflict stations, and ask for waivers to rules barring ownership of two of the four highest-rated stations in Greensboro-Winston-Salem-High Point, Indianapolis, and Harrisburg-Lancaster-York in order to address the acquisition's conflicts with FCC and DOJ rules regarding station ownership that have held up the merger's regulatory approval. The stations in conflict overlaps would have been placed in a divestment trust to have been independently overseen by Rafamedia LLC if ordered to be sold off under the initial proposal, which was negated due to sale agreements that were reached by Sinclair in subsequent weeks; Sinclair later rescinded the top-4 waiver requests for the Harrisburg stations on March 7, and for the Greensboro stations on April 24.	
23	Disney Channel announced two of its most popular animated shows: Amphibia and The Owl House.	
26	CBS Sports launches CBS Sports HQ, a 24-hour, online-only sports news network. Built upon the same format as sister network CBSN, CBS Sports HQ features rotating blocks of news, analysis and highlights, but does not carry live sporting events, as that capacity is already being handled by the linear cable/satellite service, CBS Sports Network.	
27	Fox News hosts Tucker Carlson and Sean Hannity issued an apology to its viewers after it had run segments detailing claims that CNN scripted a February 21 town hall meeting event featuring the survivors of the Stoneman Douglas High School shooting. The misleading claims came to light just six days after Colton Haab, who was one of the students that was credited with saving his classmates, went on both Carlson and Hannity's shows and claimed that CNN tried to give him a scripted question that he refused to use because he wanted to use his own, sparking a backlash against CNN over staging the event for ratings and getting a tweet from President Donald Trump slamming the network. But on February 26, Glenn Haab, Colton's father, admitted that he was responsible for the fabrication of the story by doctoring the emails to make it look like it was set up by CNN, thus confirming the network's claim that it never used any form of scripted material for the event.	
28	Warner Bros. Television announces that they have fired producer/creator Jeff Franklin after he was involved in vulgar and profanity-laced tirades behind the scenes. The news comes almost two months after his Netflix hit Fuller House is renewed for its fourth season. The writing team of Steve Baldikoski and Bryan Behar, who have been with the series since its debut, were later named to succeed Franklin as show runners of Fuller House on March 12.	

=== March ===
Date	Event	Source
1	A major crossover event takes place on ABC's TGIT (Thank God It's Thursday) primetime lineup. In the Grey's Anatomy episode "You Really Got a Hold on Me" (which culminated into the launch of its spin-off Station 19), Ben Warren (Jason George) and Andy Herrera (Jaina Lee Ortiz), firefighters from Seattle Grace fire department, Station 19, head to the fictional Grey-Sloan Memorial Hospital – where Herrera met with Meredith Grey (Ellen Pompeo) – after rescuing two boys from a house fire. Meanwhile, in the two-hour crossover episodes of Scandal and How to Get Away with Murder ("Allow Me to Reintroduce Myself" and "Lahey v. Commonwealth of Pennsylvania"), Olivia Pope (Kerry Washington) gets an unexpected visit from criminal defense attorney Annalise Keating (Viola Davis), who seeks her help in fast-tracking a judicial reform class-action suit to the U.S. Supreme Court. The three-hour crossover event delivered a 1.5 rating and 5.6 million in total viewers, making it the most watched primetime lineup of the night.	
4	The 90th Academy Awards, which were held at the Dolby Theatre in Hollywood, California, aired on ABC. The Shape of Water was this year's big winner with four awards, including Best Picture. The ceremony attracted its smallest recorded US television audience, averaging 26.5 million total viewers. Jimmy Kimmel hosted for a second consecutive year, making him the first person to host back-to-back ceremonies since Billy Crystal in 1997 and 1998. As with the Grammys, the event aired outside its traditional mid-February berth to avoid conflict scheduling with the Winter Olympics. Additional safeguards to maintain the correct announcement of winners were launched by accounting firm PricewaterhouseCoopers to prevent a recurrence of the end of the 2017 ceremony, where La La Land was accidentally named Best Picture rather than Moonlight due to the incorrect envelope being given.	
5	Racecar driver Arie Luyendyk Jr. is the subject of criticism after proposing to Becca Kufrin in the season finale of ABC's The Bachelor, only to break up with her in favor of the show's runner-up, Lauren Burnham, with a camera crew in tow. All three appear on the following night's "After the Final Rose" special, with Kufrin forgiving Luyendyk and wishing him well with Burnham, whom he proposes to. Kufrin is then named the next Bachelorette.	
9	Variety reports that ABC pulled a new episode of its sitcom Black-ish over "creative differences" with the show's producers. "Please, Baby, Please", directed by creator Kenya Barris and written by Barris and Peter Saji, was shot in November and originally scheduled to air on February 27, but was replaced by a repeat of "Mother Nature". In "Please, Baby, Please", Dre (Anthony Anderson) tries to read a bedtime story to Devante during a thunderstorm, but instead improvises a new story based on recent social and political issues in the U.S. In one scene, Dre was also seen arguing with Junior (Marcus Scribner) over football players protesting during the national anthem.	
9	ESPN removes Sean McDonough as play-by-play man on Monday Night Football, returning him to college football coverage. He is succeeded by college football play-by-play man Joe Tessitore. Two months later, the network announces Tessitore will be joined by new analysts Booger McFarland and recently retired former Dallas Cowboys wide receiver Jason Witten.	
11	On this week's 60 Minutes, Secretary of Education Betsy DeVos says she does not "intentionally" visit schools that are struggling with performance standards. The secretary also has difficulty with answering questions from correspondent Lesley Stahl about school performance in DeVos' home state of Michigan. Sources tell CNN that the Trump Administration was unimpressed with the interview.	
11	The 2018 iHeartRadio Music Awards are aired on TBS, TNT, and truTV.	
12	The Church of Scientology launches an over-the-top service known as Scientology Network, initially available on DirecTV (under a brokered programming arrangement using a 24/7 infomercial channel slot), along with apps for Apple TV, Roku and Amazon Fire TV.	
13	The family of the late Democratic National Committee staffer Seth Rich sues Fox News over a retracted article that falsely claims he was murdered over a conspiracy involving the hack of DNC emails during the 2016 presidential election.	
13	Cox Media Group's flagship ABC affiliate WSB-TV/Atlanta paid tribute to hip-hop artist Craig Mack, who died at 46 on March 12, by incorporating the entire lyrics (as well as the remix lyrics featuring The Notorious B.I.G., Busta Rhymes, LL Cool J and Sean "Puff Daddy" Combs) of his signature 1994 hit "Flava in Ya Ear" into the station's newscast, courtesy of anchorman Fred Blankenship and traffic reporter Mark Arum. The tribute, which has also gone viral, is one of several the station has done upon the passing of musicians, especially in the Hip-Hop genre.	
13	The View co-host Joy Behar publicly apologizes for suggesting on a previous taping that Vice President Mike Pence suffered "mental illness" for thinking Jesus spoke to him. After her comments enraged conservatives, she privately apologized to the Vice President, but made it public at his behest.	
14	In an effort to clamp down on the content of conspiracy-theory videos after facing scrutiny over the proliferation on its service, YouTube CEO Susan Wojcicki announced a new strategy to combat misinformation by pointing users to Wikipedia and other third-party sites debunking them. The move, however, will not deter the social media service from removing the videos unless it runs afoul of the video platform's community guidelines. The effort is not formally coordinated with Wikipedia's operator, the Wikimedia Foundation, which issues a statement disclaiming as such.	
14	CNBC's Larry Kudlow is tapped by President Donald Trump to become the chairman of the National Economic Council, succeeding Gary Cohn, who resigned after losing his fight against tariffs on steel and aluminum imports, which Trump went ahead and implemented despite opposition from both political parties. On his CNBC programs, Kudlow advocates for free trade and generally opposes tariffs, issues that are opposite of Trump's economic platform, but has supported his tax cut proposals, including the overhauling of the tax code, a signature achievement of Trump's time in office so far, through its passage in December 2017. The nomination is lampooned by some political commentators and comedians because of economic forecasts made by Kudlow as a corporate financial consultant and as a host of CNBC's Kudlow & Cramer, Kudlow & Company and The Kudlow Report that were later proved inaccurate.	
14	MTV dismisses reports coming from TMZ that it was ending the Total Request Live revival. The program is instead refocused to have additional morning and late night editions, the latter having started in February (and replacing the defunct Music Feed), the former to start in the summer.	
14	In support of youths walking out of school to protest gun violence, cable networks owned by Viacom Media Networks go dark for 17 minutes (one minute for each victim of the Stoneman Douglas High School shooting), with regularly scheduled programming on MTV, VH1, BET, Nickelodeon and others withheld.	
20	Fox News strategic analyst and retired Army Lt. Col. Ralph Peters resigns, calling the network a "propaganda machine" for the Trump administration and accused the network of "wittingly harming our system of government for profit," in an email sent to his colleagues that was obtained by BuzzFeed. He added that Fox News was "assaulting our constitutional order and the rule of law" and fostering "corrosive and unjustified paranoia" to its viewers and that Fox News's hosts were advancing the agenda of Russian president Vladimir Putin (who was re-elected in a landslide two days earlier, with weak opposition due to some more formidable challengers either being detained or banned from running) "by making light of Russian penetration of our elections and the Trump campaign," but praised some of the network's anchors and reporters for challenging Fox News's editorial line on the Trump administration.	
21	As the debate over gun control continues following the Stoneman Douglas High School shooting, YouTube announces it will no longer allow videos that promote the sale or assembly of firearms, including bump stocks.	
22	In a move to expand the independent production company into a major media group, Entertainment Studios announces that it will acquire The Weather Group (parent company of The Weather Channel, Local Now and Weatherscan) from a consortium of NBCUniversal, The Blackstone Group and Bain Capital for $300 million.	
23	ABC O&O KABC-TV/Los Angeles reporter Karl Schmid reveals he has been HIV positive since 2008.	
24	The 2018 Kids' Choice Awards are aired on Nickelodeon with John Cena hosting.	
25	CBS airs Anderson Cooper's one-on-one interview with Stephanie Clifford (f.k.a. Stormy Daniels), the adult film actress who allegedly had an affair with Donald Trump in 2006, on 60 Minutes. Critics of the President pushed for the piece to run sooner; however, editorial oversight plus the timing of another exclusive with Mohammad bin Salman did not make that possible. Clifford's attorney, Michael Avenatti, also indicated that his client faced threats as far back as 2011 to keep quiet about details that were offered in the story, despite being paid $130,000 in hush money. Viewership for the broadcast, which was delayed 35 minutes from its scheduled 7:00 p.m. ET start due to the preceding NCAA men's basketball regional final between Kansas and Duke going to overtime, more than doubled from normal to 22.1 million viewers, making it the highest rated 60 Minutes since the first interview with Barack and Michelle Obama after the 2008 election. Finally at overtime in the fourth round of the NCAA men's basketball regional final at the CenturyLink Center Omaha in Omaha, NE, Bill Self's Kansas Jayhawks defeat Mike Krzyzewski's Duke Blue Devils with a score of 85–81 in the Midwest Regionals.	
26	On the same day the network cancels his three-season-old sitcom, Game Shakers, Nickelodeon and producer/writer Dan Schneider jointly announce that they will not renew their longstanding development deal, ending a 24-year relationship that saw Schneider produce some of the network's iconic series of the 1990s, 2000s and 2010s including All That, Kenan & Kel, The Amanda Show, Drake & Josh and iCarly. (Despite this, the network is expected to renew its remaining Schneider's Bakery sitcom, Henry Danger, for a fifth season.) The termination of the deal comes amid rumors of complaints of temperamental behavior by Schneider from members of his staff and questions over his treatment of some younger stars of his shows, along with issues between him and Nickelodeon executives over production of the shows repeatedly going over budget and behind schedule.	
27	The first episode of Roseanne in 21 years attracts an audience of 18.2 million people, outperforming the series' original finale by 10 percent and notching the highest rating for a comedy in the 18-to-49 demographic since the eighth-season premiere for The Big Bang Theory. The success of the Roseanne reboot, which reveals matriarch Roseanne Conner (played by Roseanne Barr) as a supporter of Donald Trump, prompts a congratulatory phone call to Barr from the President himself. On March 30, ABC announced the show had been renewed for the 2018–19 season.	
27	Heineken immediately removes a television commercial for its Heineken Light beer, which depicted a bartender sliding a bottle of the aforementioned beverage past women of darker skin color to one of lighter skinned complexion. The clip, whose campaign slogan was "Sometimes, Lighter is Better," came under fire on social media after Chance the Rapper called for a boycott against the Dutch brewing giant and calling the ad "terribly racist" on Twitter on Sunday evening and other users agreed with him. Heineken issued an apology for making an error in judgment over the message in the ad.	
28	Just hours after Axios reports that the Trump Administration were looking at targeting retail and streaming media giant Amazon and its founder/CEO Jeff Bezos over Amazon's tax treatment because they believe its presence is forcing physical local retailers out of business, as most other e-commerce companies didn't pay state sales taxes when they launched in the 1990s, using laws dating back as long as 50 years ago made for catalog retailers that said they didn't have to collect sales taxes in states where they did not have a physical presence, not to mention President Trump's criticisms of Bezos' The Washington Post over their push of fake news against him. White House spokesperson Sarah Huckabee Sanders dismissed the story, saying there are no plans to go after the company, as antitrust regulations and the limited powers that will prevent Trump from doing so is cited as a factor.	
29	Laura Ingraham issued an apology to her viewers after she made comments about David Hogg, one of the survivors of the Stoneman Douglas High School shooting after he spoke out for advocating gun control laws during the March 24 "March for Our Lives" rally, claiming that he was being turned down by universities after reading a tweet from a conservative website that falsely branded Hogg as a "Gun Rights Provocateur" (her tweet read "David Hogg Rejected By Four Colleges To Which He Applied and whines about it..." "Dinged by UCLA with a 4.1 GPA...totally predictable given acceptance rates."). Hogg, however, did not accept Ingraham's apology and called for a boycott of her Fox News program The Ingraham Angle, a move that has resulted in around 15 companies (including TripAdvisor, Nestlé, Expedia, and Wayfair) pulling advertising from the show because of its conservative rhetoric. Hogg, who listed the companies that advertises on her program in the hope to remove their spots from the show, tweeted that he will only accept the apology "if you denounce the way your network has treated my friends and I in this fight."	
29	A pair of mystery-centric shows, Supernatural and Scooby-Doo, crossed paths in its first ever television crossover between a live-action series and an animated series. The episode, titled "Scoobynatural," brought the Winchester Brothers and Castiel into a twisted episode of Scooby-Doo, Where Are You! from 1970 ("A Night of Fright Is No Delight") after Dean acquires a TV set that is cursed, but unlike the aforementioned episode, the synopsis had a darker take including the unmasking of the villain featured in the original episode.	
29	A pair of women accuse The Ren & Stimpy Show creator John Kricfalusi of sexually abusing them in the 1990s while they were minors. Kricfalusi, who was in his 40s at the time, admitted to BuzzFeed that he had an underage girlfriend during the years in question.	
31	Deadspin releases a video compilation of anchors at stations owned and/or operated by Sinclair Broadcast Group across the U.S. reading a standardized script that warns viewers of "false news" and "fake stories" by unnamed media outlets, calling them "dangerous to [a] democracy." The promos – which opened further scrutiny to the right-skewing content required to air on Sinclair's stations as well as the group's corporate culture – draw immediate backlash on social media for their mirroring of talking points about mainstream media outlets espoused by President Trump and other conservatives, with commenters and even some Sinclair talent likening it to a "hostage" video.	

=== April ===
Date	Event	Source
8	During a segment that discussed about the public's feelings on "Fake News" and who is the most trusted news source based on a poll conducted by Monmouth University, Howard Kurtz, the host of Fox News Channel's Media Buzz, became upset with the displayed graphics from the results of the poll (the banner read "Who do you trust more?") showing Fox News at 30 percent, with CNN and MSNBC coming in at 48 percent and 45 percent respectively, prompting Kurtz to tell the staffers to have the display removed and telling viewers "This is not the graphic we're looking for," and demanded it be "Hold off. Take that down please." Although Kurtz did allow the graphics to return later during a discussion with pollster Frank Luntz and apologized to viewers. He later criticized on Facebook (April 9) that "the Associated Press should be embarrassed by a story that utterly distorts what happened yesterday [April 8] on my program" after the AP made the mistake a primary story in their wire service, this despite AP spokeswoman Lauren Easton having pointed out in an email statement that the story "was corrected to show that the graphic was taken down because it was used in the wrong segment, and was used again on the show."	
9	Entravision Communications makes major cuts and layoffs at all of its properties, including shutting down news operations at 23 of the 58 television stations it owns or operates around the United States, consolidating production of those stations' newscasts into their El Paso flagship KINT-TV.	
9	Sinclair-owned KDNL-TV/St. Louis fires Jamie Allman and cancels his weeknight news/commentary program The Allman Report, amid a viewer and advertiser boycott that ensued over a March 26 tweet by the conservative talk host that alluded to wanting to "ram a hot poker up David Hogg's ass," which was lambasted for its threatening nature and connotations to sexual assault. The move – which resulted in the station replacing Allman with syndicated programs in its former weeknight 5:00 and 10:00 p.m. timeslots, and a sixth rerun of America This Morning in place of a day-behind morning rebroadcast – again leaves KDNL as one of the largest ABC affiliates without some kind of news presence, an issue that has occurred intermittently since the October 2001 shutdown of the original in-house news operation it started in January 1995, seven months before KDNL and KTVI, respectively, swapped their affiliations with Fox and ABC.	
9	Rapper Cardi B co-hosts The Tonight Show Starring Jimmy Fallon, marking the first time in the NBC late-night talk show's franchise that it had two people sharing hosting duties. The episode, which also featured guest John Mulaney (who, alongside show host Jimmy Fallon, gave baby gifts to Cardi B – who revealed her pregnancy during her performance on Saturday Night Live two days prior), coincides with the release of her debut album Invasion of Privacy, where she performed her song "Money Bag". Kevin Hart would later take on co-hosting duties with Fallon for the September 19 episode.	
15	James Comey begins a press junket for his upcoming book A Higher Loyalty through an interview with George Stephanopoulos on the ABC program 20/20, the former FBI director's first public one-on-one since being fired by Donald Trump a year earlier. In the days following, he'll appear on CBS' The Late Show with Stephen Colbert, plus The Lead with Jake Tapper and a town hall hosted by Anderson Cooper, both for CNN.	
15	Around 5:10 p.m. EDT, a high-end EF2 tornado – with peak winds estimated around 135 mph (217 km/h) – sideswipes the studios of WFMY-TV/Greensboro, North Carolina, knocking out power and communications to the building just as the station was preparing to interrupt CBS's coverage of the RBC Heritage golf tournament with a live weather cut-in on a tornado warning that was issued for Guilford County three minutes after the tornado formed over Interstate 40 in eastern Greensboro. Station employees were evacuated to a cinder block hallway for shelter as the twister – which caused damage to a nearby residential area, killing one person and injuring ten others – passed within one mile of the building.	
15	The 53rd Academy Awards are aired from the MGM Grand Garden Arena on CBS.	
16	Sean Hannity is revealed as one of the legal clients in court documents during a federal investigation into President Donald Trump's personal lawyer Michael Cohen after his New York City office was raided April 9 over a series of illegal payment arrangements and other deals (among them silencing or intimidating individuals in order to protect Cohen's clients) that could have criminal implications. Cohen's attorney Todd Harrison named Hannity, who is known to actively support Trump on his both his radio and television programs, as the client in court, one of at least ten individuals who assisted Cohen with legal advice and/or "strategic advice and business consulting," of which five of the unnamed individuals were referred to another law firm, who is now cooperating with authorities and distancing themselves from Cohen.	
16	Parents of two of the victims of the 2012 Sandy Hook Elementary School shooting sue radio host Alex Jones, who has long claimed the shooting was faked. They are seeking $1 million. The parents cited evidence and statements from his interviews on Sunday Night with Megyn Kelly and Anderson Cooper 360° as reasons, which Jones claimed on his website InfoWars and eponymous radio show that their appearance to counter his claim was digitally altered at the time, of which both shows have dismissed.	
17	London Broadcasting announces it will sell Sonlife Broadcasting Network affiliate KCEB/Longview, Texas, to HC2 Holdings for $225,000. The purchase marks London's exit from broadcasting; the group – which, at its peak, owned eight stations in mostly mid-sized and small markets throughout Texas, with the exception of the Dallas-Fort Worth market – had previously sold six of its stations (NBC affiliate KCEN-TV/Waco, CBS affiliate KYTX/Tyler-Longview, ABC affiliates KIII/Corpus Christi and KBMT/Beaumont-Port Arthur, and Fox affiliates KXVA/Abilene and KIDY/San Angelo) to the Gannett Company for $215 million in May 2014, and sold KTXD-TV/Greenville to Cunningham Broadcasting for $9.5 million in September 2017.	
18	Disney Channel celebrates its 35th anniversary.	
19	The transmission tower used by KOZK/Springfield, Missouri, collapses, while workers employed with Columbia, South Carolina-based Tower Consultants Inc. were performing maintenance in preparation for the PBS station's channel re-allocation in the first round of the spectrum repack set to occur later in the year. One worker was killed in the accident; five others sustained non-life-threatening injuries, requiring three of them to be hospitalized briefly. In addition to taking the KOZK broadcast signal off-the-air, the accident involving the 1,980 feet (600 m) tower near Fordland also disrupts service to local NOAA Weather Radio station WXL46, which also houses its transmitter on the structure.	
20	Oral arguments commence in a case filed by several public interest groups (led by Free Press) against the FCC's April 2017 decision to reinstate the UHF discount, a law first passed in 1985 to encourage UHF station ownership by counting the market coverage of such stations by 50% of their total. The case, to be presided by a three-judge panel at the U.S. Court of Appeals for the District of Columbia Circuit, will look at whether the FCC superseded administrative procedure when it voted to reinstate the cap, which the plaintiffs contend has been used by broadcasters as a loophole against the federally mandated 39% national ownership cap. The final ruling on the case could directly impact Sinclair Broadcast Group's pending acquisition of Tribune Media, as the combined group will skirt under the cap with the discount in place.	
23	Warner Bros. announces the expansion of acquiring and producing TV content for the South Korean market, as well as licensing South Korean formats for the U.S. and distribution of its library of programs in the country, under a new division to be headed by brothers Suk and Hyun Park, whose DramaFever streaming and video content service was acquired by Warner Bros. Digital Networks in 2016.	
24	Sinclair Broadcast Group announces that it will sell 23 television stations that it or Tribune Media owns or operates in 18 markets, in a move by Sinclair to seek regulatory approval of its purchase of Tribune. Sinclair and Tribune will sell a total of nine stations (KOKH-TV/Oklahoma City, WRLH-TV/Richmond, KDSM-TV/Des Moines, WXLV-TV/Greensboro, WOLF-TV-WSWB-WQMY/Wilkes Barre-Scranton, WXMI/Grand Rapids and WPMT/Harrisburg) to Standard Media, an arm of private equity firm Standard General, for $442 million. Tribune will also sell KPLR-TV/St. Louis to the Meredith Corporation (owner of CBS affiliate KMOV in that market) for $65 million. Five other stations (Sinclair-owned KUNS-TV/Seattle and KMYU/St. George, Utah, and Tribune-owned KAUT-TV/Oklahoma City, all of which will be sold to Howard Stirk Holdings for a collective $4.95 million, and Tribune's KDAF/Dallas-Fort Worth and KIAH/Houston, both of which will be sold to Cunningham Broadcasting for $60 million) will be sold to groups affiliated with Sinclair and will operate them under shared services and joint sales agreements, joining Tribune flagship WGN-TV/Chicago, which Sinclair had already proposed for sale to WGN-TV LLC, a new affiliate licensee owned by an associate of Sinclair executive chair David D. Smith.	
25	Nickelodeon announces that they're bringing its most popular game show Double Dare for a second revival (The first revival came in 2000 in which the show was renamed Double Dare 2000) due to the success of the 30th Anniversary Special that aired in November 2016 and the popularity of the show itself. The network ordered a 40-episode season which aired from June 25 to the end of 2018. On May 22, Liza Koshy was announced as host, while original host Marc Summers would take a dual role, serving as both the replacement announcer for the retired John Harvey and color commentary. Several team configurations, including 2 vs. 2/3 vs. 3 child teams, 4 vs. 4 family teams and celebrity episodes have been a part of the season.	
26	Two women formerly employed with NBC News – including former correspondent and NBC News at Sunrise anchor Linda Vester – accuse former NBC Nightly News anchor Tom Brokaw of sexual harassment that occurred in the 1990s.	
26	Bounce TV announces it has pulled repeats of The Cosby Show from the African-American-focused multicast network's schedule, effective immediately, following the news that a jury found series star, actor/comedian Bill Cosby, guilty of three counts of aggravated indecent assault that occurred in 2004. Upon sentencing, Cosby could face up to 30 years in prison (ten for each count). TV One, meanwhile, continues to air the show even after the conviction.	
26–27	Fox broadcasts coverage of the first two evenings of the 2018 edition of the NFL draft for the first time, carrying coverage simulcast with NFL Network featuring that network's personalities, along with Fox Sports. The sports division acquired the broadcast rights for the draft in accord with Fox's five-year agreement to carry Thursday Night Football. This will also be the first time the event, previously a cable television exclusive, has aired on free over-the-air television. This will not affect ESPN, which will continue to produce its own coverage of the draft. In addition, ESPN's coverage will also be simulcast on ESPN2, which will feature a college-themed broadcast, and ABC, which will simulcast coverage of rounds 4–7 of the draft, therefore broadcasting the entire draft on broadcast television.	
29	Beginning with this night's broadcast ("Disney Night") and continuing for the remaining 16th season episodes airing over the next three weeks, ABC's American Idol becomes the first major in-season reality competition program on American television to be broadcast live in all U.S. time zones (though it also airs at its usual time on a second-run tape delay in the Pacific Time Zone, Alaska, and Hawaii), which allows viewers to watch and vote at the same time, with real-time results being announced at the end of the show rather than the traditional next day 'results show'. (ABC's Rising Star had aired live under the same format for its only season in the summer of 2014, outside of the Pacific time zone receiving the show on tape delay.)	
29	With the episode "Forgive and Regret" (which features a gunfight between Maggie Simpson and Marshal Matt Dillon in the opening sequence), Fox's The Simpsons surpasses CBS' Gunsmoke as the longest-running American scripted primetime television series by number of episodes. Originating as a series of animated shorts starring the title family which became part of The Tracey Ullman Show for three seasons starting in 1987, the Matt Groening-created animated sitcom debuted on the network in December 1989 and has since featured dozens of recurring characters and a record–setting number of guest stars.	
29	The 45th Daytime Emmy Awards, hosted by Mario Lopez and Sheryl Underwood, are broadcast via livestream on various streaming and social networking services (including Facebook, Twitter, and YouTube). The ceremony saw actors Bill and Susan Seaforth Hayes, and TV producers Sid and Marty Krofft being honored as Lifetime Achievement Award recipients (the latter two of whom were honored during the Creative Arts ceremony on April 27), Joely Fisher's performance of "Astonishing" (from Little Women) during In Memoriam segment, and tributes to the iconic shows celebrating major milestones this year including the 50th anniversary of Mister Rogers' Neighborhood, as well as General Hospital and M*A*S*H's 55th and 45th anniversaries, respectively. Days of Our Lives, Good Morning America and The Talk also won awards.	
30	Gray Television announces it will purchase religious independent WLHG-CD/Lynchburg, Virginia, from Liberty University for $50,000. The purchase includes an option for Gray to acquire Cozi TV affiliate WFFP-TV/Danville, with which (along with WLHG) Gray will enter into a shared services agreement to take effect on June 15, whereby the group – which owns CBS affiliate WDBJ-TV – would provide programming for and receive a share of the revenue from programming and advertising sales, following the closure of the sale.	

=== May ===
Date	Event	Source
1	After having reached a deal to become the new master toy licensee for Power Rangers in mid-February (replacing Bandai), Hasbro purchases the franchise outright, along with further children's franchises owned by Saban Brands, including Glitter Force, My Pet Monster, Popples, Julius Jr., Luna Petunia and Treehouse Detectives in a cash-and-stock pact valued at $522 million. The Power Rangers television series is relatively unaffected, as it remains on Nickelodeon and its sister networks until 2021 under a new agreement also made in February (Hasbro holds a 40% stake in the competing network Discovery Family). The deal closes on June 12 with the completion of the acquisition.	
1	Kanye West makes a surprise appearance on TMZ Live, in which the rapper details his support for President Donald Trump, his reasons for free thinking, and explaining his thoughts on slavery, as he points out "When you hear about slavery for 400 years. For 400 years?! That sounds like a choice." The remarks from West sparked a backlash from viewers.	
1	Gray Television announces that it will purchase NBC affiliate KDLT-TV/Sioux Falls, South Dakota, from Red River Broadcasting in an all-cash deal worth $32.5 million. The purchase – which Gray states will be immediately free cash flow accretive – would create a legal duopoly with primary ABC/subchannel-only CW Plus affiliate KSFY-TV, likely marking the first time since the FCC abolished limits on legal television duopolies based on the number of independent owners within a media market in November 2017 that a small-market station has formed a legal duopoly with a competing outlet without the aid of a failing/failed station waiver. The transaction is expected to be finalized in the second or third quarter of 2018.	
1	PlayStation Vue is forced to remove all Big Four affiliates among the 193 television stations owned and/or operated by Sinclair Broadcast Group that had been carried by the over-the-top MVPD service after SBG alleges a breach of contract terms. The move – which, ironically, comes four months after Vue began carrying additional Sinclair stations (predominately Fox affiliates) – resulted in the stations being replaced by video-on-demand services operated by ABC, CBS, NBC and Fox, and subscribers also losing access to programs recorded via the affected stations on Vue's DVR.	
3	TBS and Conan O'Brien announce that Conan will transition to a half hour, looser-structured format in 2019. TBS also announced a multi-city tour for later in 2018 as part of a partnership spanning television, digital, social and live events. To top it off, in celebration of his 25 years on late night, they will be making O'Brien's entire catalogue from NBC's Late Night with Conan O'Brien, and Conan on TBS, available digitally. The first episode is uploaded to the Team Coco YouTube channel on September 13, the show's exact anniversary, revealing that the entire Late Night catalog will be available in January.	
4	KGO-TV/San Francisco parts ways with sports anchor Mike Shumann after an incident in which he was seen on video taking a jacket that belonged to the head of security for the Golden State Warriors during the first round of the 2018 NBA Playoffs. A former NFL wide receiver, Shumann had been with the ABC owned-and-operated station for 24 years.	
5	Stormy Daniels makes a surprise cameo appearance on Saturday Night Live, in which the porn star joined Ben Stiller (as Michael Cohen), Martin Short (as Dr. Harold Bornstein), Kate McKinnon (as Rudy Giuliani), Cecily Strong (as Melania Trump), Leslie Jones (as Omarosa Manigault), Scarlett Johansson and Jimmy Fallon (as Ivanka Trump and Jared Kushner, respectively) and Alec Baldwin (as Donald Trump) in an opening sketch involving Trump's problems outside his inner circle. This includes Daniels' ongoing lawsuit over the payment made to her that Cohen had admitted that he made personally but later became a bigger issue when Giuliani went on Hannity to claim that it was Trump who gave Cohen the money to pay off Daniels after the president denied he had any involvement. In the sketch, Daniels told Trump he should resign, then adds "I know you don't believe in climate change, but a storm's a coming, baby."	
8	Clayne Crawford is fired by Fox and Warner Bros. Television from his role as Martin Riggs on Lethal Weapon after in late April it was revealed he had "been disciplined several times over complaints of emotional abuse and creating a hostile environment" while shooting. Seann William Scott was announced to succeed Crawford as the show's co-lead (portraying a new character, with the Riggs character being written out) on May 13, ahead of Fox's expected renewal of the series for a third season.	
9	Fox Television Stations announces it will purchase seven stations – Fox affiliates KCPQ/Seattle, KTXL/Sacramento, KSWB-TV/San Diego, KDVR/Denver, WJW/Cleveland, and KSTU/Salt Lake City and CW affiliate WSFL-TV/Miami – from Sinclair Broadcast Group (which contributed the stations for sale on behalf of their existing owner, Tribune Media, on February 22) for $910 million, including options for Sinclair to acquire CW affiliate/MyNetworkTV O&O (and sister to Fox O&O WFLD) WPWR-TV/Chicago and Fox O&O KTBC/Austin (where Sinclair already owns CBS affiliate KEYE-TV) for potential respective proceeds of about $15 million and $160 million. Sinclair also reaches a long-term affiliation deal with Fox for most of the 38 existing Fox stations owned by Sinclair and/or operated through LMA partner licensees. The deal would give Fox ownership of stations covering 45.9% of U.S. households (30.4% with the UHF discount factored in) and owned-and-operated stations in 19 of the top 20 markets, while Sinclair expects to reach 62% of the U.S. (37.4% with the discount) post-acquisition as a result of the Fox purchases and prior divestitures tied to the Tribune merger.	
10	After months of negotiations, Adult Swim renews its animated comedy Rick and Morty for 70 episodes spanning a currently undetermined amount of seasons, more than twice what has already aired. Creators Dan Harmon and Justin Roiland enter a new agreement with the network.	
11	Brooklyn Nine-Nine is picked up by NBC 37 hours after its cancellation on Fox, following a slew of fan outrage and outspoken celebrities sharing their disappointment. The show's sixth season was ordered initially for 13 episodes, expanded to 18 in September, and set for a January premiere in November. Hulu and TBS had also considered picking up the series.	
17	Brad Kern exits as showrunner of NCIS: New Orleans following CBS conducting a pair of internal investigations after several of his colleagues complained about his behavior and a hostile work environment. He will be succeeded by executive producer Chris Silber.	
17	Production on MTV's Catfish: The TV Show is suspended after host and executive producer Nev Schulman is accused of sexual misconduct. On June 25, 2018, the suspension was lifted and the show will resume after the report of sexual misconduct was found to be "not creditable".	
19	An estimated 1.9 billion people, including 29 million Americans on all the major broadcast and cable news channels (along with Lifetime and BBC's America and World News networks), watch as Prince Harry married Meghan Markle.	
19	The host of the Food Network show Ginormous Food, Josh Denny, draws attention for a series of racist tweets, including equating the term "Straight White Male" as the modern equivalent to "nigger", and saying that "blacks" are "late to everything". The program had already been canceled due to low ratings, leading at least one writer to speculate that the host was trying to draw more media attention to himself. In 2019, Denny was convicted of exposing himself to a minor and sentenced to 6 months' probation.	
20	The 2018 Billboard Music Awards, which was hosted by Kelly Clarkson and held at the MGM Grand Garden Arena in Las Vegas, is broadcast on NBC. The program's shift to NBC follows the conclusion of a relationship between Billboard and ABC that dates back to the award show's revival (following a five-year absence resulting from contractual expiration and other circumstances) in 2011. In the wake of a mass shooting at a Santa Fe, Texas, high school that left 10 people dead and 14 wounded, Clarkson opened the broadcast paying tribute by forgoing a moment of silence, explaining that they are no longer sufficient when "once again ... we're grieving for more kids" who died for "no reason at all," and encouraging viewers to take part in "a moment of change" to combat gun violence. Kendrick Lamar – whose wins included Top Billboard 200 Album (for Damn) and Top Rap Male Artist – and Ed Sheeran – whose wins included Top Artist and Top Male Artist – were the night's big winners, with both earning six awards each.	
21	Olympic figure skater Adam Rippon (who won the bronze medal with his figure skating teammates at the 2018 Winter Olympics in Pyeongchang in February) is crowned the winner of the athletes-focused 26th season of ABC's Dancing with the Stars, becoming the first openly gay contestant to win the show. Rippon and his pro partner, Jenna Johnson, beat NFL cornerback Josh Norman and former figure skater Tonya Harding (and their respective pro partners, Sharna Burgess and Sasha Farber) to win the show's Mirror Ball trophy. This is also the first Mirror Ball for Johnson, whose only prior stint as a pro partner in season 23 saw her and celebrity partner Jake T. Austin finish 13th as the first pairing eliminated that season. (Prior to the 26th season, the former So You Think You Can Dance finalist had primarily served as a dance troupe member since joining DWTS in season 18.) The one-hour abbreviated finale delivered a 1.1 rating and an audience of 8.67 million, making it – alongside American Idol's sixteenth season finale – the most watched programs of the night.	
21	Maddie Poppe wins the sixteenth season of American Idol, the show's first-season finale to air on ABC. Poppe – who earns a recording contract with Hollywood Records (owned by ABC parent The Walt Disney Company), which replaced Big Machine Records as the show's artist label – is the first singing competition's first female winner since season 12 contestant Candice Glover. Caleb Lee Hutchinson – who reveals during the broadcast that he and Poppe are dating – is runner-up (making it the first season since season 6 to feature a female winner and male runner-up), and Gabby Barrett finishes second runner-up. The two-hour finale – which was watched by 8.65 million viewers and had a 1.6 demographic rating – features performances from and contestant duets with Patti LaBelle, LeAnn Rimes, Darius Rucker, Bebe Rexha, Nick Jonas and Kermit the Frog (the latter of whom performs "Rainbow Connection" with Poppe, who had performed the night prior and during her initial judge audition). Jimmy Kimmel Live! also paid homage to the series' past featuring appearances by several personalities from the series' history including former judge Randy Jackson, former finalists and winners such as Haley Reinhart, Taylor Hicks and Ruben Studdard, and other notable past contestants including William Hung, Larry Platt (known for auditioning with the original song "Pants on the Ground") and Sanjaya Malakar.	
21	The Miss USA 2018 pageant was held at the Hirsch Memorial Coliseum in Shreveport, Louisiana (which previously served as the venue for the 1997 pageant) and was broadcast by Fox and Azteca. The show was hosted by the married pairing of singer Nick Lachey and former Miss Teen USA 1998 Vanessa Lachey, with stylist/fashion expert Carson Kressley and pageant coach Lu Sierra serving as backstage hosts. Pop group 98 Degrees (of which Nick Lachey is a member) and country singer Lee Brice performed. Kára McCullough of District of Columbia crowned her successor Sarah Rose Summers of Nebraska – who will represent the United States at Miss Universe 2018 in November – as the winner of the pageant; Caelynn Miller-Keyes of North Carolina was the runner-up. Summers' win marks the first Miss USA crown for a Miss Nebraska contestant.	
22	ESPN reaches a five-year broadcast rights deal with the UFC to acquire the rights to a portion of the mixed martial arts promotion's television package currently held by Fox Sports for $300 million per year (or $1.5 billion over the course of the contract). The deal, which expands upon a five-year, $750-million streaming rights deal reached by ESPN (for its over-the-top service ESPN+) on May 8, will result in an additional 30 fights per year (comprising 15 that would be carried on ESPN's linear channels and 15 that would air exclusively on ESPN+) being carried on the linear ESPN channels.	
22	After Bryan Fuller stepped down in February, and only four days after their series Once Upon a Time concluded its seven-season run, Adam Horowitz and Edward Kitsis are named showrunners of Amazing Stories that will be part of Apple's streaming service. In addition, the duo also sign a production deal with ABC Studios that will run through 2022.	
22	Nielsen signs a deal with YouTube TV, which will now see the streaming service incorporate their local audience measurements into the ratings provider in 99 television markets.	
23	Quincy Media discloses it has reached agreements to acquire CW Plus affiliates WISE-TV/Fort Wayne, Indiana, and KDLH/Duluth, Minnesota, from SagamoreHill Broadcasting – which has maintained joint services agreements for the stations with Quincy since the former's 2015 acquisition of WISE and KDLH from Granite Broadcasting/Malara Broadcast Group – for $1.7 million. The deal, which was originally signed on May 16, would create duopolies with Quincy's existing respective stations in those markets, ABC primary/NBC subchannel-only affiliate WPTA and NBC primary/CBS subchannel-only affiliate KBJR-TV, and, in pertinence to the FCC's television spectrum repacking, includes a provision that would reassign the stations to a new channel assignment. According to FCC filings, which seek a waiver of rules barring common ownership of two television stations in markets with fewer than eight distinctive licensees, ratings for both WISE and KDLH had slid to fifth place among the stations in the Fort Wayne and Duluth markets since their respective former NBC and CBS affiliations moved to the DT2 subchannels of WPTA and KBJR in August 2016.	
23	On the same day as the station's sale is announced, Dish Network removes KDLH-TV/Duluth from its lineup in Minnesota's Iron Range region, after failing to reach a new carriage agreement with SagamoreHill. Representatives with Quincy and JSA partner SagamoreHill stated that the issue that led to the CW affiliate's removal concerned contractual language of the contract, acknowledging that no "meaningful discussions" on fees had been made." The move marks the first time since 2009 that SagamoreHill has been involved in a carriage dispute.	
23	ABC announces the cancellation of its daytime talk/cooking show The Chew after seven seasons. Episodes of the program will continue to air through early September, after which it will be replaced by a third-hour extension of Good Morning America, the network's second attempt at such an expansion following the short-lived afternoon edition titled Good Afternoon America that ran from July to September 2012 (following the cancellation of the talk/lifestyle show The Revolution, and preceding the shift of General Hospital to the 2:00 p.m. Eastern Time slot). The program's cancellation announcement comes five months after former co-host Mario Batali was subsequently fired following allegations of sexual misconduct by four women.	
23	In CBS, at the conclusion of Survivor: Ghost Island, the final tribal council were deadlocked for the first time in the show's history, as the ten-member jury voted a tie with Domenick Abbate and Wendell Holland five votes apiece. Laurel Johnson, who received no votes prior, cast her deciding tiebreaker vote to award Holland the "Sole Survivor" title. This is also the first time besides the inaugural season the jury votes were read on-site instead of at the live finale.	
24	Debra L. Lee announces she will step down as chairwoman and CEO of BET Networks, effective May 28.	
25	Sesame Workshop, the parent company and producers of Sesame Street, files a lawsuit in federal court against STXfilms over the use of its name being used as promos for the August 17 release of the R-rated crime comedy The Happytime Murders, which stars Melissa McCarthy as a detective investigating a series of gruesome murders involving puppets who formerly starred in a children's program from the 1990s. The production company objected to the studio's use of the series title in its ads, which reads "No Sesame, All Street," and the content of the "explicit, profane, drug-using, misogynistic, violent" film, as well as the depiction and likeness of the characters, who were created for the film by director Brian Henson, the son of Jim Henson, whose Muppets characters are featured on Sesame Street.	
27	The Indianapolis 500 airs for the final time on ABC (locally on Scripps-owned affiliate WRTV, though on a tape delay as the live telecast is blacked out to encourage attendance; WRTV has aired the broadcast since it became an ABC affiliate in 1979), ending a relationship between the network and the Indianapolis Motor Speedway that dates back to 1965. Beginning in 2019, the Indy 500 will air on NBC (and locally on Dispatch-owned affiliate WTHR, which reunites the telecast with the station after it switched to NBC in 1979), the result of a three-year exclusive TV rights deal announced on March 21 between the IndyCar Series and NBC Sports Group, whose NBCSN has split coverage of IndyCar races with ABC since 2009 (when the channel was known as Versus) and will split coverage of the series with NBC in the new deal. Australian racecar driver Will Power wins the race, while American Danica Patrick (who is on her final professional race as a full-time competitor before her retirement and her first Indianapolis 500 since 2011) crashes on lap 68 when she loses control of her car in turn 2, finishing in 30th place.	
28	WYFF/Greenville, South Carolina, anchor Mike McCormick and photojournalist Aaron Smeltzer are killed when a tree fell on their car on U.S. Route 176 in Polk County while covering the impact of heavy rain in that area caused by Subtropical Storm Alberto. McCormick joined the Hearst Television-owned NBC affiliate in April 2007 as a reporter after being worked on that company's sister stations, ABC affiliate KHBS/Fort Smith, Arkansas, and its satellite station KHOG-TV/Fayetteville, Arkansas, for three years, while Smeltzer worked as a photographer in the Greenville region for more than a decade before joining WYFF in February of this year.	
29	After series star Roseanne Barr makes a racist remark on Twitter about Valerie Jarrett, a Senior Advisor for former U.S. president Barack Obama, ABC Entertainment president Channing Dungey announces the rescission of Roseanne's season 11 renewal, and the sitcom is cancelled on behalf of the network. This results in Barr being dropped by her agency, ICM Partners, and ABC suspending its Emmy campaign for the series. Reruns of the series' original nine-season run are also pulled from the lineups of Viacom-owned Paramount Network, TV Land and CMT effective May 30, and Scripps/Katz-owned digital multicast network Laff effective immediately; Hulu later announced that all episodes (including those from the revival's nine-episode run) have been removed from its library.	
31	Comedian Samantha Bee becomes the subject of controversy after she called Ivanka Trump a "feckless cunt" during the previous night's broadcast of TBS' Full Frontal during a segment in which Bee made a request to Ivanka Trump to ask her father to do something about immigration policies that have resulted in children being separated from their parents. Much of the criticism came from conservatives who equated the remark to the controversy surrounding Roseanne Barr's tweet about Valerie Jarrett – including the White House, which condemned Bee's use of the word and demanded that TBS parent Time Warner take action against her. Both Bee and TBS apologized for the incident. Autotrader and State Farm subsequently pulled their advertising from program amidst the controversy.	
31	Cheddar reaches a deal with Viacom to acquire MTV Networks on Campus, which it will use to launch CheddarU, a television service that will feature content from Cheddar's namesake flagship financial news streaming service and segments from its general news service Cheddar Big News to 99 million students at more than 600 college and universities. Qualifying universities would be able to carry CheddarU as part of their campus cable/OTT services free of charge. The existing linear mtvU network will continue on cable providers without any changes.	

=== June ===
Date	Event	Source
1	Hallmark Channel abruptly parts ways with Home & Family co-host Mark Steines, who had been co-host since the show's revival in 2012. He is soon succeeded by Cameron Mathison. On September 20, 2018, Steines files suit with Lisa Bloom against Hallmark parent Crown Media and Woody Fraser Productions, claiming executive producer Fraser sexually harassed female talent and guests on the series and that his complaints to Crown management about his superior's behavior were ignored, to the point he would lose pay and involvement in show marketing until his termination (Bloom had already been pursuing previous sexual harassment claims against Fraser).	
5	Fox News issues an apology to members of the Super Bowl LII champion Philadelphia Eagles after airing photos that show players kneeling on the field, giving the appearance of being related to the NFL national anthem protests controversy that led President Donald Trump to disinvite the team from the White House. However, in criticizing Fox News on Twitter for "being used (as) propaganda," tight end Zach Ertz, one of the players shown kneeling, clarified that he had been praying with teammates. The network said in a statement that indeed no player on the Eagles knelt in protest either during the regular season or playoffs.	
6	The 2018 CMT Music Awards air from the Bridgestone Arena.	
7	Producer Greg Berlanti extends his production deal with Warner Bros. Television through 2024, now valued at over $300 million. At the time of the extension, Berlanti is a producer on 16 current or upcoming shows across seven networks (14 live-action across six), half of them for Warner Bros.-owned The CW, and two for DC Universe, also owned by the company.	
7	The Washington Capitals defeated the Vegas Golden Knights in five games in 2018 Stanley Cup Final (broadcasts on NBC and NBCSN) to win their first Stanley Cup, breaking the district's 26-year championship drought dating back to the Washington Redskins winning Super Bowl XXVI in 1992.	
8	CNN host Anthony Bourdain is found dead in France of a suicide, abruptly ending his CNN series Anthony Bourdain: Parts Unknown. The network announced a tribute special to air that night and Parts Unknown marathons over the weekend. In addition, Travel Channel announced a 12-hour marathon of Anthony Bourdain: No Reservations, the former series' direct predecessor, to air that Sunday, and free over-the-top service Pluto TV began airing a 24-hour Bourdain tribute channel rerunning his programs.	
8	The NBA Finals which began on May 31 and were carried by ABC with the fourth consecutive match up of the Cleveland Cavaliers and Golden State Warriors, are concluded with a sweep by the Warriors for their second consecutive title. They were the first NBA Finals to have a presenting sponsor, after YouTube TV jointly announced with the NBA on March 26 its sponsorship of the Finals.	
8	ABC and series star Priyanka Chopra issue apologies for the plotline of the June 1 episode of the network's drama Quantico, titled "The Blood of Romeo". It depicted Hindu nationalists trying to make it look as though Pakistan were behind a terror plot in New York City. Much of the outrage over reinforced stereotyping was aimed at Chopra, despite her only being an actor on the show with no creative input.	
9	Bob Costas makes what turns out to be his final major on-air assignment for NBC Sports, when he serves as host for the network's coverage of the Belmont Stakes. On January 15, 2019, it was announced that Costas had officially departed from NBC Sports after forty years.	
10	The 72nd Tony Awards are broadcast live on CBS from Radio City Music Hall, hosted by Sara Bareilles and Josh Groban. Harry Potter and the Cursed Child wins Best Play, and The Band's Visit wins ten awards, including Best Musical.	
11	Ion Media announces it will exercise an option to purchase four "zombie" stations owned by the Trinity Broadcasting Network that had their spectrum sold in the 2017 incentive auction, WCLJ-TV/Indianapolis, WDLI-TV/Cleveland, WSFJ-TV/Columbus, Ohio, and WKOI-TV/Dayton, Ohio (the former two already have channel sharing agreements with the Ion stations in Indianapolis and Cleveland, basically returning full spectrum control of those stations to Ion if approved). In FCC filings for the transfer, TBN withheld information on the sale price and other statistics pertaining to the November 2017 option agreement included as part of channel sharing agreements with Ion involving the four stations on grounds that it is "proprietary, not germane to the FCC's evaluation of the application, or already in the FCC's possession." Another deal around the same time saw KILM/Inglewood-Los Angeles, a Multicultural Broadcasting-owned "zombie" carrying a brokered network known as Punch TV, also to be purchased by Ion for $10 million; KILM is under a channel sharing agreement with Ion's KPXN-TV. The latter sale closes September 17, with Ion moving the virtual channel KPXN-DT3 (carrying its Ion Life network) to KILM's virtual channel 64.1, along with gaining its must-carry coverage on local pay-TV systems.	
12	A federal judge approves AT&T's $85 billion merger with Time Warner, concluding a lawsuit filed against the deal by the Department of Justice in November 2016 on grounds that the DOJ's Antitrust Division had failed to meet the burden of proof that it would harm competition and result in consumer price increases. The deal closes two days later, with Time Warner being rechristened as WarnerMedia shortly after.	
13	In an attempt to thwart The Walt Disney Company's planned acquisition of most 21st Century Fox assets, Comcast (owner of rival NBCUniversal) makes a $65 billion all-cash bid on the entertainment assets of the Rupert Murdoch-owned company, which includes Fox Sports Networks, FX Networks, Sky plc (which Comcast had already made a separate bid for back in February), Star India, and a 30% stake in Hulu (which, when combined with their existing 30% stake, would give Comcast a controlling interest in the streaming service). Comcast had been waiting on a decision in the AT&T/Time Warner matter before proceeding with the offer. However, one week later Disney upped its bid to $71.3 billion in cash and stock, which Fox favors over Comcast; Comcast subsequently dropped its bid on July 19. 21st Century Fox and Disney shareholders approved the acquisition to the 20th Century Fox assets on July 27. (The deal is still pending regulatory approval in other countries, including China and Brazil, where 21st Century Fox and/or Disney also own media properties.)	
13	Broadcasting & Cable reported that Jerry Springer was now out of production after a 27-year run and that the 2018–19 season forward will solely consist of reruns, while another hour of Springer reruns will be programmed by The CW in their daytime timeslot beginning in September 2018 for their affiliates, replacing failed competitor The Robert Irvine Show. However, the network retains the right to ask for new episodes (produced by NBCUniversal); Springer later confirmed that the show was canceled, but had produced unaired shows prior to the announcement. The move comes as Tribune Broadcasting (the lessee of the timeslot until the end of the 2020–21 season under an agreement made at the time of its latest renewal for the network on its stations) was preparing to complete its acquisition by Sinclair Broadcast Group, which played a factor in the program not being renewed by its stations, thus hurting its clearances.	
14	Star Trek: Discovery showrunners Aaron Harberts and Gretchen J. Berg are fired from the series due to budgetary issues and allegations of mistreatment and abuse. Co-creator and executive producer Alex Kurtzman takes over sole showrunner duties. Five days later, it was announced that Kurtzman extended his production deal with CBS Television Studios through 2023, including "expansion of CBS' Star Trek franchise for television, developing new series, mini-series and other content opportunities, including animation." The deal is valued at $25 million and under it, his production company Secret Hideout will also continue to develop new projects for broadcast, cable and streaming platforms exclusive to CBS.	
14 – July 15	Fox Sports and Telemundo broadcasts the 2018 FIFA World Cup respectively in English and Spanish with a mainly morning and early afternoon schedule of games due to the tournament being played in Russia (seven hours ahead of American Eastern Daylight Time). The two replace previous rights holders of the soccer tournament, ESPN/ABC and Univision, which lost the exclusive English and Spanish language telecast rights following the 2014 tournament. On June 14, Fox issued an apology after English singer Robbie Williams showed his middle finger while performing his song "Rock DJ" during the opening ceremony. Telemundo sibling NBCSN simulcast Spanish coverage of two matches: Brazil vs. Switzerland on June 17, and England vs. Belgium on June 28.	
15	During Fox Sports' coverage of the 118th U.S. Open from Southampton, New York, microphones pick up a discussion between two men about a sexual encounter one of them had with their former female partner, which included explicit language about the encounter (it was carried during FS1's portion of the coverage, leaving it out of FCC purview). Both Fox Sports and the tournament's organizer, the United States Golf Association, apologized for the mishap. Fan decorum at the U.S. Open in general was criticized by participant Ian Poulter, who was harassed at times by the gallery when it was his turn to putt.	
16	Following allegations of sexual abuse in an article on Medium written by ex-girlfriend Chloe Dykstra, in which the actress (who dated Hardwick from 2011 to 2014) referred to him only as a "mildly successful podcaster" who grew into "a powerhouse CEO of his own company" in outlining the allegations, AMC pulls the Chris Hardwick-hosted talk show Talking with Chris Hardwick's second-season premiere from the schedule, and he withdraws as moderator for the network's San Diego Comic-Con panel featuring The Walking Dead and Fear the Walking Dead as well as BBC America's panel for the British sci-fi series Doctor Who, set to be the first public appearance for the new cast, led by Thirteenth Doctor Jodie Whittaker. The day before, Nerdist, the company which Hardwick founded, cut all ties with him. He denies the allegations. NBC later stated that it would "assess" developments concerning Dykstra's accusations before making decisions concerning Hardwick's gig as host of game show The Wall. On July 3, Yvette Nicole Brown was reported to be the new moderator of the Walking Dead panel, and interim host of Talking Dead 10 days later, starting with The Walking Dead Season 9 Preview Special on August 5. On July 25, AMC announced Hardwick will return as host of Talking Dead and Talking with Chris Hardwick following the completion of an investigation conducted with Ivy Kagan Bierman of law firm Loeb & Loeb. On July 31, NBC announced Hardwick will return as host of The Wall for a next season. On August 10, his name was then returned to Nerdist's website.	
18	Laura Ingraham faces mounting criticism over comments she made on her Fox News Channel program The Ingraham Angle, in which she referred to the detention centers where children of undocumented immigrants detained and arrested at the U.S.–Mexico border have been placed under Trump's "zero tolerance" immigration policy – which has received widespread condemnation, and have been compared to internment facilities that housed Japanese Americans and German Jews – as "essentially summer camps," which Ingraham attempted to walk back before the end of that night's broadcast. Hollywood producers such as Steven Levitan (who suggested, in his criticism of Fox News, he would terminate his relationship with 20th Century Fox Television after the current contract for Modern Family ends in 2019), Seth MacFarlane (who tweeted that he was "embarrassed to work for Fox News and Fox network parent 21st Century Fox" concerning a remark by Ingraham's Fox News colleague Tucker Carlson that viewers should dismiss reports by major news outlets as untrue), Judd Apatow and Paul Feig criticized the remarks, with many also calling for an advertiser boycott of Ingraham's show and Fox News, which defended Ingraham's remarks by stating, "Fox News will never tolerate or give in to attempts to silence diverse viewpoints by agenda-driven intimidation efforts."	
19	On the evening after Laura Ingraham's comments, former Trump campaign manager Corey Lewandowski makes the sad trombone sound effect during a Fox News segment focusing on a 10-year-old girl with Down syndrome separated from her mother at the border. Appearing again on Fox News the following morning, he refused to apologize for the incident, which led to Washington, D.C., speakers bureau Leading Authorities, Inc. terminating its relationship with Lewandowski.	
19	During the last moments on her MSNBC program, host Rachel Maddow begins to break down and cry while reading a breaking news story from the Associated Press that Trump administration officials have been sending young children to at least three age-specific shelters as part of the Justice Department's new "zero tolerance" immigration policy that's resulted in thousands of kids being separated from their parents. The "tender age" facilities reportedly house children with special needs and those younger than 13. The story becomes too emotional for Maddow to continue, so she passes the story to Lawrence O'Donnell, who was in Texas at one of the detention facilities as he leads off the breaking news story on his program The Last Word. Maddow last apologized to viewers about what happened, saying "If nothing else, it is my job to actually be able to speak while I'm on TV," she wrote. "I apologize for losing it there for a moment. Not the way I intended that to go, not by a mile."	
21	More than three weeks after the cancellation of Roseanne, ABC announces it intends to revive the show as The Conners. John Goodman, Sara Gilbert, Laurie Metcalf, Lecy Goranson, and Michael Fishman will all reprise their roles on the new series, which will occupy the same Tuesday evening time slot Roseanne would have had. Roseanne Barr will have no involvement in its production, ABC said.	
22	ABC pulls an episode of reality dating series The Proposal (which was originally scheduled to air on June 25) from the schedule after a woman named Erica Denae Meshke accused contestant Michael J. Friday of luring her for sexual assault that took place in November 2017.	
24	The BET Awards 2018 are aired with Jamie Foxx hosting.	
25	Gray Television agrees to acquire the assets of Raycom Media in a cash-stock deal valued at $3.687 billion (comprising $2.85 billion in cash, $650 million in preferred stock, and 11.5 million shares of Gray common stock). Should regulatory approval be obtained, the combined company, which will operate under the existing Gray corporate umbrella, will – with coverage estimated at 24% of U.S. television households – become the third-largest broadcaster in terms of audience reach, owning or operating 142 full-power stations in 92 markets (its portfolio will encompass stations in markets as large as Tampa-St. Petersburg-Sarasota to as small as North Platte, although it will divest overlapping stations in nine conflict markets). Other than disclosing that an SSA involving Fox affiliate WUPW/Toledo would be transferred to the prospective buyer of CBS-affiliated sister WTOL. Post-acquisition, longtime company head Hilton H. Howell Jr. will serve as Gray's executive chairman and co-CEO, but will cede his role as company president to Raycom President/CEO Pat LaPlatney (who will also serve as a co-CEO).	
25	David Bossie, a former aide to the Trump campaign, is suspended from his contributor role at Fox News for two weeks after telling Joel Payne, an African-American Democratic strategist, he was "out of (his) cotton-picking mind" during a debate on Fox & Friends Weekend the previous day. The comment, viewed as a dog whistle, was quickly condemned by anchor Ed Henry, who called it "obviously offensive."	
25	The E. W. Scripps Company sells its Tulsa radio cluster (Classic Hits station KBEZ, Country station KVOO, Classic Country station KXBL, Top 40/CHR station KHTT, and News/Talk station KFAQ, all of which were co-owned with NBC affiliate KJRH-TV since Scripps's 2015 acquisition of the radio group's former parent Journal Communications) to Griffin Communications. The transaction re-enters the Oklahoma City-based television broadcaster into radio station ownership since it sold off its stations in Oklahoma City, Tulsa and Fort Smith between 1956 and 1969 (when co-founders John T. Griffin and Jimmy Leake broke up the company into two entities), and pairs the stations up with the CBS/CW duopoly of KOTV and KQCW. (Griffin has, however, owned the Radio Oklahoma Network syndicated news service since 2001.)	
27	The United States Department of Justice approves the takeover of 21st Century Fox's entertainment assets by The Walt Disney Company on the condition that the sale not include Fox's 22 regional sports networks as originally planned. Disney's majority ownership of ESPN Inc. is cited as the reasoning for the divestiture. It is unknown whether the RSNs will be divested to other companies or remain part of the smaller "New Fox", which will include the remainder of Fox Sports.	
29	Comcast subscribers throughout the United States are affected by an outage believed to be caused by a cut fiber. Reports of issues began coming into Twitter and an Internet monitoring website around 12:30 p.m. EDT from cities such as Atlanta, Baltimore, San Francisco, Seattle, and Comcast's home base of Philadelphia. A company statement indicated that Comcast was working to resolve the problem, but it wasn't known how soon service would be fully restored.	
30	Dish Network and Sling TV subscribers throughout the United States lose access to the 60 Univision and UniMás television stations (as well as both networks' national feeds) and various cable channels (including Galavisión, Univision Deportes Network, El Rey Network and Fusion TV) owned by Univision Communications around 4:00 p.m. EDT due to a dispute over carriage fees, which also resulted in both parties being unable to reach a two-week contract extension to resolve contractual terms. Dish contended that Univision asked it to increase retransmission fees by 75%, which it felt an unreasonable offer, citing Univision's declining ratings and its failure to secure the rights to the 2018, 2022 and 2026 FIFA World Cups (the Spanish language rights of which went to rival Telemundo). Univision denies Dish's claim that it had ended negotiations, stating that "[Dish] insists on paying Univision only a fraction of what it pays our English-language peers." On July 30, Dish offered subscribers of its DishLatino and Sling Latino tiers who lost access to the channels a $5 per month credit, beginning August 1.	

=== July ===
Date	Event	Source
2	Tri-State Christian Television announces it has consolidated programming at all of its stations at TCT's headquarters in Marion, Illinois, taking advantage of the end of the FCC's Main Studio Rule. All locally produced programming at the network's other owned-and-operated stations was canceled, and the network's Orchard Park, New York, studio for WNYB/Jamestown-Buffalo was closed and placed up for sale.	
2	The BBC, through the representation of an American law firm, files federal court papers in California and ordered a subpoena after learning that a source that was linked to the social media platform Tapatalk had leaked unauthorized scenes and footage from the upcoming season of Doctor Who to numerous websites and fan-based entities. The leaked details were revealed June 26, prompting mixed results from fans of the series, especially with the spoilers from the series' future episodes.	
4	Fox News Channel anchor Brit Hume apologizes to his viewers after he made a comment he posted and then deleted it on Twitter about questioning how patriotic people who are affiliated with the Democratic Party are in the United States, saying "Why Do Democrats Hate America?" and added, "Hate may be too strong a word but they sure don't love it —>." Hume was referring to a Gallup poll published July 2 that found that 32 percent of Democrats consider themselves "extremely proud" of being U.S. citizens, down from 56 percent in 2013, with only 74 percent of Republicans called themselves "extremely proud" to be American, the highest the group has been in five years, according to the poll. Hume later clarified in another tweet that the statement was uncalled for and admitted his mistake: "I deleted an earlier tweet that said Democrats don't love America. It was based on a Gallup poll that found only a minority of Dems now very proud of this country... "A number of people said they think that's not a fair conclusion from the poll. I agree and thus the deletion."	
15	Nexstar Media Group reaches an agreement to purchase CW affiliate WHDF/Florence, Alabama, from Lockwood Broadcast Group for $2.25 million. Under the terms of the deal, Nexstar concurrently assumed operational responsibilities for the station through a time brokerage agreement that will conclude upon the transaction's closure. The acquisition will create a duopoly with Huntsville-based Fox affiliate WZDX (which Nexstar acquired as part of its November 2013 purchase of Grant Broadcasting System II's television stations).	
18	In a unanimous 4–0 vote, the Federal Communications Commission voted to send the merger proposal between Sinclair Broadcast Group and Tribune Media to a hearing before an administrative law judge to review aspects of the deal that FCC chairman Ajit Pai described as "deceptive" in their transparency, specifically regarding shell corporations being used by the company to operate stations that would materially reduce Sinclair's national ownership cap space short of the 39% limit, two days before. Pai's comments led Sinclair to amend its acquisition proposal (the fifth such instance since Sinclair disclosed its sale proposals to the Department of Justice Antitrust Division in February) to transfer Tribune flagship WGN-TV/Chicago from WGN-TV LLC (a licensee that was to have been owned by Steven Fader, a Maryland auto dealer and business associate of Sinclair executive chairman David D. Smith) to Sinclair directly, and to sell Texas-based CW affiliates KDAF/Dallas-Fort Worth and KIAH/Houston to an independent third party (rather than sell it to Cunningham Broadcasting, which, until January, had been owned by the estate of Carolyn Smith, the now-deceased mother of David Smith and widow of company founder Julian Sinclair Smith, which retains non-voting stock interest) hours prior to the merger review vote.	
18	The 2018 ESPY Awards air from the Microsoft Theater with Danica Patrick hosting.	
20	The 2018 Kids' Choice Sports are hosted by Chris Paul on Nickelodeon.	
22	In an appearance on Showtime's Who Is America?, Georgia state lawmaker Jason Spencer exposes his bare buttocks, imitates a Chinese tourist using racial stereotypes, and repeatedly yells "nigger", all at the urging of a character portrayed by series star Sacha Baron Cohen. After facing backlash from Georgia's Speaker of the House and governor, Spencer apologized for what he described as a "ridiculously ugly episode" but refused to step down, saying that the show's producers exploited his state of mind "for profit and notoriety". He announced his resignation on July 24, stating in a letter to the House speaker it would take effect at month's end.	
24	PBS member station WPBA/Atlanta – which, since 2005, has been constrained to carry no more than 25% of the service's programming under its Program Differentiation Plan – reaches an agreement to convert into a 100% full-service PBS member station to better compete with the Georgia Public Broadcasting member network (which is available in Atlanta through its Athens-licensed television flagship WGTV), in a bid to increase viewership, public and private monetary contributions and corporate underwriters. Under the deal, WPBA will be allowed to license any PBS programs for broadcast starting in September, which will result in a roughly $500,000 per year increase in programming expenditures that will go towards licensing additional PBS content and expanding local program production. The station will inform GPB of its scheduling decisions to avoid scheduling conflicts. (Existing shows on WPBA's schedule as well as newer shows being added to its lineup will be scheduled on a timeshifted basis to avoid such conflicts.)	
24	Cox Enterprises announces that it is exploring a possible sale or a merger for the 14 television stations owned by its Cox Media Group unit (consisting of CBS affiliates WHIO-TV/Dayton, KIRO-TV/Seattle-Tacoma and WJAX-TV/Jacksonville [the latter of which Cox operates through an LMA with proxy licensee Hoffman Communications], ABC affiliates WSB-TV/Atlanta, WSOC-TV/Charlotte and WFTV/Orlando, Fox affiliates WHBQ-TV/Memphis, WFOX-TV/Jacksonville, KOKI-TV/Tulsa and WFXT/Boston, independent stations WRDQ/Orlando and WAXN-TV/Charlotte, MyNetworkTV affiliate KMYT-TV/Tulsa, and NBC affiliate WPXI/Pittsburgh). The division is the Atlanta-based broadcaster's most profitable sector apart from its cable, radio and newspaper properties, which Cox plans to keep should a buyer emerge.	
25	A three-judge panel of the U.S. Court of Appeals in Washington, D.C., dismisses a challenge to the FCC's May 2018 restoration of a UHF discount quota that counted UHF television stations by half their local market reach and effectively gave station groups additional space under the national television ownership cap (artificially increasing their potential coverage from the Congressionally mandated 39% maximum of all U.S. television households to as much as 78%). The panel did not weigh the merits of the case in the two-page ruling, only judging that the interest groups involved in the case (led by Free Press) – who sued on ground that the discount would allow groups reaching near the 39% cap the ability to acquire more stations without going over it (with Sinclair Broadcast Group, which is believed to have any future acquisitions that may utilize the quota hampered amid questions by the FCC over other methods it used in its proposed merger with Tribune Media) and accelerating media consolidation in the broadcast television industry – lacked standing. The move also precedes potential FCC consideration of possibly abolishing or altering the UHF discount upon proposals to raise the cap to cover ownership coverage reaching as much as 50% of U.S. television households.	
26	Personnel with KRCR-TV/Redding, California, are evacuated from the Sinclair Broadcast Group-owned ABC affiliate's studio building around 10:30 p.m. PDT as flames associated with the Carr Fire (which was first reported on July 23 in the Whiskeytown–Shasta–Trinity National Recreation Area, and started by a vehicular mechanical failure) approached close to its facility in eastern Redding. Anchors Allison Woods and Tamara Damante, who were helming coverage of the fire, notified viewers on-air of the evacuation order; KRCR continued to provide regular updates about the fire on its website and Facebook page, with field reporters filing video reports for the latter. As a result of the fire danger, the station temporarily relocated its news staff to the studios of and relayed coverage from its Eureka-based semi-satellite KAEF-TV.	
27	The New York Public Service Commission revokes its approval of the merger between Charter Communications and Time Warner Cable, effectively no longer permitting Charter to serve customers in New York State. The commission's ruling is based on assertions that Charter failed to comply with several conditions required by the commission in the 2016 merger on grounds that the cable provider failed to meet deadlines, attempted to skirt obligations to provide service to rural communities and utilized unsafe field practices. Charter, as with its predecessor Time Warner, had been the lone cable provider and default Internet service provider for the vast majority of the state since Time Warner took over the assets of Adelphia Communications in 2004; only a few small pockets in Cattaraugus and Cayuga Counties, along with portions of the New York City metropolitan area (where Altice USA is the default provider), have a provider other than Charter. Charter will be required to continue uninterrupted operations for 60 days until the state transitions to a replacement provider and pay $3 million in penalties.	
27	In a report for The New Yorker by Ronan Farrow, Les Moonves is accused of sexual misconduct by six women. Farrow, who had also written on the Harvey Weinstein sexual abuse allegations, details accounts by the women of the CBS Corporation president and CEO attempting to kiss and inappropriately touch them. One of the accusers, actress Illeana Douglas, said Moonves was hostile towards her after she rejected him. The board of directors at CBS announced that it will launch an investigation into Moonves' alleged behavior. The news comes as Moonves is embroiled in a dispute with CBS and Viacom vice chair Shari Redstone over her wishes to recombine the two companies. Redstone denies she is behind the allegations, but calls for the investigation to be "thorough, open and transparent."	
30	Hearst Television announces it will purchase CW affiliate WPXT/Portland, Maine (which also carries subchannel-only affiliations with MeTV, MyNetworkTV, Escape and Laff) from Ironwood Communications for $3.35 million. The purchase, creates a legal duopoly with ABC affiliate WMTW/Poland Spring, and is the sixth Hearst CW affiliate. The sale closes on September 21, with the station picking up a 10 p.m. newscast from WMTW only three days later.	

=== August ===
Date	Event	Source
1	Mobile, Alabama-based law firm Clay, Massey & Associates (by way of legal representative Robins Kaplan LLP) files a class action antitrust lawsuit in the U.S. District Court for the Northern District of Illinois against Sinclair Broadcast Group, Tribune Media, Gray Television, Hearst Communications, Nexstar Media Group and Tegna Inc., alleging that the six groups coordinated to artificially inflate advertising prices and reduce competition for advertising sales in the broadcasting market. The suit comes days after reports surfaced that the Justice Department is investigating whether communications between advertising staff at the television station groups identified in the lawsuit violated antitrust laws. The suit comes three days after Little Rock-based lawyer Peter Miller (via the firm of Kessler Topaz Melzer and Check) filed another class action suit against Sinclair and Tribune in the U.S. District Court for the District of Maryland on the same allegations levied in the Clay, Massey & Associates suit.	
2	In a press release formally announcing its $2.25-million purchase of CW affiliate WHDF/Florence–Huntsville from Lockwood Broadcast Group, Nexstar Media Group also announces it will acquire Fox affiliate KRBK/Springfield, Missouri, from Koplar Communications for $16.45 million. The transaction – which will create a virtual triopoly with MyNetworkTV affiliate KOZL-TV, which ironically lost the Fox affiliation to KRBK during a 2011 reverse compensation dispute between Fox and Nexstar that also involved three Indiana-based stations, and Mission Broadcasting-owned CBS affiliate KOLR-TV – includes a local marketing agreement (which took effect the day prior) that will see Nexstar assume KRBK's operations. The move marks Koplar's second exit from television; the company signed on KRBK (then a MyNetworkTV affiliate) in August 2009, twelve years after it sold KPLR-TV/St. Louis to ACME Communications.	
3–6	In what was cited as various violations of company terms of service policies, podcast, video and live streaming content from conservative talk show host and conspiracy theorist Alex Jones and his InfoWars platforms are removed by YouTube, the Apple Podcasts directory, Facebook and Spotify. Spotify and Apple Podcasts remove audio content from their directories, followed by Facebook removing four of Jones' pages, and then YouTube removing several InfoWars channels, with 2.4 million followers. Both latter companies had already temporarily suspended InfoWars since late July. Genesis Communications Network (which syndicates Jones' radio program) continues to maintain podcast feeds on their own, with Jones continuing to self-host his other content. Apple then follows up on September 7 with a removal of the InfoWars app from the iTunes Store, a day after Jones and InfoWars are permanently removed from Twitter and Periscope.	
7	After an all-out bidding war that included an offer from Lance Bass, the Los Angeles home that was featured in The Brady Bunch television series and franchises is acquired by HGTV, which plans to restore the house to its original 1970s design.	
8	Laura Ingraham once again sparks controversy on her Fox News program The Ingraham Angle, this time during a segment regarding immigration and the increasing diversity in America, telling viewers "In some parts of the country, it does seem like the America we know and love don't exist anymore," and added "Massive demographic changes have been foisted upon the American people. And they're changes that none of us ever voted for and most of us don't like... Much of this," she added, "is related to both illegal and in some cases legal immigration that, of course, progressives love." Ingraham was referring to claims that minorities and especially immigrants would be the majority while Caucasians would soon be a minority based on research and data, leading to claims from media critics and politicians that her segment was filled with code words and dog whistles that sounded bias and to support claims from Alt-Right and Nationalist groups, which Ingraham later dismisses by contradicting the statements made during the program.	
9	Fifteen months to the date after it was first announced, Tribune Media announces it has terminated its deal to merge with Sinclair Broadcast Group, to which it agreed to sell its television, radio and other associated properties for $3.8 million in May 2017. Tribune also announces that it has filed a lawsuit against Sinclair in the Delaware Chancery Court alleging breach of contract, seeking at least $1 billion in damages "for all losses incurred as a result of Sinclair's material breaches of the merger agreement." The suit alleges that Sinclair engaged in "unnecessarily aggressive and protracted negotiations" with the FCC and the Department of Justice over the deal's regulatory issues, refused to sell stations in markets where Sinclair already had properties (although it did agree to sell a combined 17 Tribune- and Sinclair-managed stations to Fox Television Stations and Standard Media), and proposed divestitures and sales to parties with ties to Sinclair executive chair David D. Smith (those of WGN-TV/Chicago to Maryland auto dealer Steven Fader, KDAF/Dallas–Fort Worth and KIAH/Houston [and initially, WPIX/New York City] to Cunningham Broadcasting, and KUNS-TV/Seattle, KMYU/St. George, Utah, and KAUT-TV/Oklahoma City to Howard Stirk Holdings) that either were directly or faced likelihood of being rejected in order to maintain control over stations it was required to sell. The move comes after the FCC voted in July to send the merger application for review by an administrative law judge, alleging that Sinclair misrepresented or omitted material facts in its applications (including those involving Fader and Cunningham) in order to circumvent FCC ownership rules. Tribune also canceled the corresponding sale of stations to Fox Television Stations without penalty to Fox (who had renewed the affiliations of six Tribune Fox stations three days before to assure those stations of remaining with the network), with the possibility of selling those stations in the future; later that day, Sinclair filed to rescind its applications for the merger. As a result of the deal's termination, Tribune Media announced the collection of a $135 million termination fee from Sinclair.	
12	The 2018 Teen Choice Awards are hosted by Nick Cannon and Lele Pons.	
16	In reporting the death of Aretha Franklin at age 76, Fox News runs a graphic which has Patti LaBelle in the background instead of Franklin. Fox says the image should have shown the two performing together, however "Ms. Franklin was obscured in that process, which we deeply regret."	
19	Fox Sports 1's broadcast of a Major League Soccer match between D.C. United and the New England Revolution features an on-air broadcast team of Lisa Byington (play-by-play), Danielle Slaton (color analysis), and Katie Witham (sideline reports). The trio is believed to be the first all-female team to call a game in one of the 5 major U.S. men's sports leagues (MLS, NFL, NBA, NHL, and Major League Baseball).	
20	The 2018 MTV Video Music Awards airs on MTV and its sister networks. For the first time since 2016, there was no host appointed by MTV. The event of course also bought controversy as usual, especially with Nicki Minaj calling out Kevin Hart and Tiffany Haddish for making a dig at Fifth Harmony members (in particular Camila Cabello), while Madonna's tribute to fellow Detroiter Aretha Franklin draws backlash over her speech that had limited mention of Franklin and focused on Madonna's journey into the music business (she later revealed that she was originally slated to present the "Video of the Year" award, only to be asked to do a tribute hours before the broadcast) and her African-inspired outfit the former wore during the broadcast.	
20	Gray Television announces it has entered into agreements to sell television stations in eight markets to alleviate ownership conflicts concerning its merger with Raycom Media in deals worth a combined $235.5 million. Lockwood Broadcast Group reached an agreement to purchase Raycom-owned Fox affiliates WTNZ/Knoxville (where Gray will retain CBS affiliate WVLT-TV and CW affiliate WBXX-TV), WFXG/Augusta, Georgia (where Gray will retain CBS affiliate WRDW-TV and NBC affiliate WAGT-CD), WPGX/Panama City, Florida (where Gray will retain NBC affiliate WJHG-TV and CBS affiliate WECP-LD) and WDFX-TV/Dothan, Alabama (where Gray will retain CBS affiliate WTVY and NBC affiliate WRGX-LD). The E. W. Scripps Company agreed to purchase ABC affiliate KXXV-TV/Waco, Texas, and satellite station KRHD-CD/Bryan (where Gray will retain CBS affiliate KWTX-TV and semi-satellite KBTX-TV) and WTXL-TV/Tallahassee (where Gray will retain CBS affiliate WCTV and Retro Television Network affiliate WFXU). Tegna also agreed to purchase CBS affiliate WTOL-TV/Toledo (where Gray will acquire ABC affiliate WTVG; the sale to Tegna likely includes rights to an existing shared services agreement with American Spirit Media-owned Fox affiliate WUPW) and NBC affiliate KWES-TV/Odessa-Midland (where Gray will retain CBS affiliate KOSA-TV). The move follows Gray's August 16, announcement that it would sell CBS affiliate WSWG/Albany, Georgia, to Marquee Broadcasting (which would form a duopoly with independent station WSST-TV/Cordele, to which Marquee is seeking FCC approval of its June purchase of WSST from Sunbelt-South Telecommunications).	
20	ESPN updates their BottomLine news ticker to a two-pane design with permanent space to the right for promotional announcements and programming notes, replacing the one-line version utilized since June 22, 2014. The text of the ticker remains within the 16:9 safe area.	
21	Draper Media announces it has agreed to purchase NBC affiliate WRDE-LD/Rehoboth Beach, Delaware (also serving Salisbury, Maryland) from SagamoreHill Broadcasting for $15,600,000. The purchase, which includes the construction permit for proposed WRDE translator WRUE-LD/Salisbury and is expected to close in the fourth quarter of 2018 subject to FCC approval, would create a triopoly with primary CBS/subchannel-only Fox affiliate WBOC-TV and low-power Telemundo affiliate WBOC-LD.	
22	ESPN reiterates its longstanding policy of not carrying The Star-Spangled Banner and its ceremonies preceding its weekly telecasts of NFL Monday Night Football outside of weeks where news coverage deems it appropriate to do so, to renewed criticism from President Donald Trump ongoing from the previous two seasons. The NFL's other three carrying networks (CBS, Fox, and NBC) later state they will have the same carriage policy for the anthem ceremony during the upcoming season.	
28	The Central Texas College Board of Trustees votes to grant the reassignment of the license of PBS member station KNCT/Belton–Waco, Texas, to Gray Television for $375,000. The deal – which was possible due to its UHF channel 38 allocation being one of a small number of PBS stations that transmit on a frequency not reserved for noncommercial use – would create a duopoly with Waco CBS affiliate KWTX-TV. The college trustee board voted on February 27 to wind down the operations of KNCT, which is set to cease operating as a PBS station at midnight on August 31, citing the $4.4-million cost that CTC would have had to invest in order to relocate the station's broadcast spectrum as part of the FCC's spectrum repacking process. (See the "Station closures" section for more details.)	
28	During a live broadcast that was taking place at the scene of a recent overnight shooting that left a victim dead, KRDO-TV/Colorado Springs reporter Krystal Story and photographer Pete Miller are almost run over by a driver within inches, eventually crashing into the ABC affiliate's vehicle. The driver was arrested by Colorado Springs Police, who determined the incident to be accidental and unrelated to the crime scene.	
30	CBS affiliate WWTV/Cadillac, Michigan, and satellite WWUP-TV/Sault Ste. Marie are knocked off the air following a fire that destroyed the station's transmitter building (near its former studio facility near Tustin) shortly after 11:00 p.m. Thursday, which resulted in fire department crews having to raze much of the building to fight the blaze. The fire mostly did not affect Fox-affiliated SSA partner WFQX-TV and its Vanderbilt-licensed satellite WFUP (which is operated under a shared services agreement between Cadillac Telecasting and WWTV/WWUP owner Heritage Broadcasting Group), though its own DT2 simulcasts on WWTV/WWUP were also taken down. WWTV/WWUP's newscasts were temporarily streamed exclusively online until it was able to restore the signals to Spectrum systems in Michigan's northern Lower and eastern Upper Peninsulas the following afternoon, followed by DirecTV and Dish several hours later.	

=== September ===
Date	Event	Source
3	Big Ten Network indefinitely suspends college football analyst Braylon Edwards for violating the sports cable network's social media policy, after the former Michigan Wolverines receiver tweeted harsh criticism at Wolverines center Cesar Ruiz, quarterback Shea Patterson and head coach Jim Harbaugh for their performances in the team's 24–17 loss to the Notre Dame Fighting Irish two days earlier on September 1. BTN representatives did not elaborate on the reasoning for Edwards's suspension; however, Edwards criticized the parties in the since-deleted tweet, saying "Ruiz is weak, line is weak, [S]hea is scared, fucking Michigan offense is so predictable ... Michigan football is sadly one thing ... Trash," Edwards apologized to Harbaugh, Patterson and Ruiz, but "still agree[s] with the overall message" of the comments. In a statement, Harbaugh said that "if somebody wants to attack character of anybody on the ball club, come after me — not the youngsters."	
4	Charles Dolan (founder and former CEO of the cable provider), wife Helen Dolan and sons James Dolan (former CEO of the provider) and Patrick Dolan (former president and current senior network advisor for the regional news channels) file a lawsuit against Altice in the Delaware Chancery Court, alleging that the company violated its 2015 merger agreement to acquire Cablevision Systems Corporation on grounds that the since-renamed Altice USA unit committed fraud for allegedly starving the News 12 Networks of resources (including laying off dozens of employees and planning to lay off longtime News 12 anchor Colleen McVey under ageism allegations because executives allegedly wanted a "fresh look" for its on-air talent). The complaint states that Altice agreed to operate News 12 (which serves the outer boroughs of New York City as well as New Jersey and Connecticut) through the end of 2020, maintain a staff of 462 and incur cumulative losses of up to $60 million (which the suit also states fell below that target). Altice representatives stated that the lawsuit is "completely without merit" and that the company would "vigorously" defend itself.	
5	A 34-year-old Michael Chadwick Fry crashes a silver Dodge Ram twice into the studios of Fox Television Stations's Dallas–Fort Worth duopoly of Fox O&O KDFW and MyNetworkTV O&O KDFI around 6:12 a.m. Fry – whose actions, according to Senior Corporal Debra Webb of the Dallas Police Department's media relations unit, appeared not to be connected to any animosity toward the media, noting that he was apparently upset over a 2012 officer-involved shooting in a neighboring county – subsequently exited the truck while entering into a rant about treason, shattered the floor-to-ceiling windows on the building's front and placed boxes of papers containing rambling notes next to a side door (some of which were also strewn across the sidewalk and street adjacent to the building). Bomb squad crews temporarily evacuated most of KDFW–KDFI's employees from the downtown building to investigate a suspicious bag that the suspect left behind, although some employees remained in a secure part of the building to allow KDFW to provide coverage of the story during its morning newscast Good Day (the station does not maintain a streetside on-air studio, thus the crash was into empty offices). Fry – who has a criminal record that includes prior arrests for assault, disorderly conduct, public intoxication and burglary – was taken to a hospital for a medical evaluation, and was subsequently transferred to the Denton County Jail on a criminal mischief charge.	
5	Roy Moore files a defamation lawsuit against Sacha Baron Cohen, Showtime and its parent company CBS Corporation, seeking $95 million in damages on claims he was tricked into appearing on and "suffered extreme emotional distress" by being "falsely portrayed, mocked and defamed as a sex offender and pedophile" on Who Is America?. In the segment (originally aired on July 15), Cohen – as Gen. Erran Morad, one of his characters in the satire series – talks to Moore about "Israel-developed" technology that detects sex offenders and then scans the device over Moore, causing it to beep (it was actually a simple metal detector being activated by Moore's wristwatch). During his failed 2017 bid for the Alabama U.S. Senate seat formerly held by fellow Republican and current Attorney General Jeff Sessions, Moore – who was in his 30s at the time of the alleged incidents – was accused by several women of inappropriate sexual contact with them while they were teenagers during the 1970s. Moore claims in the suit that he was told he would appear on an Israeli television program, during which he would be awarded for his support of Israel.	
6	Fox Sports Detroit suspends Detroit Tigers play-by-play announcer Mario Impemba and color commentator Rod Allen for the remainder of the season after an alleged physical altercation that occurred on September 4, in which Allen reportedly placed Impemba in a choke hold at Chicago's Guaranteed Rate Field after a game they called between the Tigers and the Chicago White Sox, a claim Allen's agent has denied. Backup announcers Matt Shepard and Kirk Gibson replaced them for the rest of the season. It was later announced that Impemba and Allen's contracts (which expired this year) were not renewed for future seasons, ending their 16 years together as broadcast partners.	
7	Host Heidi Klum, mentor Tim Gunn and judge Zac Posen announce that they will leave Project Runway (which is in the midst of returning to Bravo, the show's original carrier from 2004 to 2008, after an 11-season stint on Lifetime). Klum and Gunn, who had been part of the show since its inception, leave to develop a new reality series at Amazon Video, with no further details being revealed; Posen, who announced he would leave the show hours after the departures of Klum and Gunn were announced, departs after six seasons on the show.	
8	The popular Disney Junior series Sofia the First ended its run with the television film Sofia the First: Forever Royal.	
9	CBS Corporation announces the departure of president and chief executive officer Les Moonves "effective immediately" as The New Yorker publishes more allegations of sexual misconduct in addition to what Ronan Farrow had reported for the magazine one month earlier. Chief operating officer Joseph Ianniello will take on the role of president/CEO in the interim, while the board looks for a successor. A separate settlement reached by National Amusements concurrently with Moonves's departure saw the corporate parent of CBS Corporation and Viacom agree to defer a proposed merger between the two companies for at least two years after the date of the settlement. On December 17, the corporation announces that Moonves would not receive a $120 million severance package that his contract allowed, citing ample cause for his firing.	
13	Amid the onset of Hurricane Florence, employees at ABC affiliate WCTI-TV/Greenville–New Bern, North Carolina, were forced to evacuate its studio facility as wind-driven storm surge resulted in water from the Neuse River flooding eastern portions of New Bern (the WCTI-TV studios are located two blocks from the Neuse, upriver from downtown New Bern). Photos released on station social media accounts on the morning of show of September 14ed control rooms and production studios had been inundated with a few inches of river water. WCTI switched to a simulcast of hurricane coverage from fellow ABC affiliate WPDE-TV/Florence, South Carolina (both stations are owned by Sinclair Broadcast Group), until the former's staff were able to relocate to WPDE's Conway studios in order to resume local coverage of Florence.	
13	Gray Television announces it had reached an agreement to acquire SonLife Broadcasting Network affiliate KNHL/Hastings, Nebraska, from Legacy Broadcasting for $475,000. Under the terms of the deal, which was originally agreed to on May 21, Gray plans to convert the station into a satellite of NBC affiliate KSNB-TV/Superior. Gray had sold KNHL – then KHAS-TV, which had been the NBC affiliate for the Hastings–Lincoln–Kearney–Grand Island market from its sign-on in January 1956 – to Legacy in August 2014, after scuttling a plan to sell the license to Excalibur Broadcasting and operate it under a local marketing agreement amid heightened FCC scrutiny of LMAs; Gray consequently transferred KHAS's intellectual unit to KSNB and a subchannel of CBS affiliate KOLN/KGIN that June. In connection with the sale, Gray also began leasing KNHL's DT3 subchannel to simulcast the group's Lincoln-based CW Plus affiliate KCWH-LD on September 1.	
14	During The Weather Channel's coverage of Hurricane Florence, two men are seen casually walking behind Mike Seidel while the meteorologist is bracing his feet against the wind, leading to accusations on Twitter that Seidel had exaggerated the severity of the winds. In response, The Weather Channel stated, "It's important to note that the two individuals in the background are walking on concrete, and Mike Seidel is trying to maintain his footing on wet grass, after reporting on-air until 1:00 a.m. ET this morning and is undoubtedly exhausted."	
17	Julie Chen officially steps down as moderator of The Talk effective immediately, eight days after her husband Les Moonves departed as CBS Corporation CEO amid multiple allegations of sexual assault and harassment. Chen – who has co-hosted the CBS daytime talk show since its debut in October 2010 – had been absent from the program for the first week of its ninth season, which began on September 10; she addressed her decision to leave through a videotaped message to viewers on the following day's (September 18) broadcast. It had been speculated that Chen may not return to The Talk (which has discussed sexual harassment and assault allegations against various high-profile men in its opening topical segment several times over the past year) due to the allegations against Moonves as well as criticism she faced for publicly standing by him by referring to herself by her legal married name, Julie Chen Moonves, starting at the end of the September 13 eviction episode of Big Brother, on which she is expected to continue as host until Fall 2019.	
17	The 70th Primetime Emmy Awards air on NBC hosted by Weekend Update anchors Colin Jost and Michael Che. Game of Thrones wins Outstanding Drama, while The Marvelous Mrs. Maisel wins five awards, including Outstanding Comedy Series, and Outstanding Lead Actress and Supporting Actress in a Comedy Series for Rachel Brosnahan and Alex Borstein respectively. The HBO series Barry wins Outstanding Lead and Supporting Actor for Bill Hader and Henry Winkler respectively. Highlights include a "Reparation Emmys" pre-taped sketch where Emmys are handed out to black actors of past beloved shows, a full tribute to Betty White, and a mid-speech marriage proposal from Outstanding Directing for a Variety Special winner Glenn Weiss, who had won for directing the 90th Academy Awards, to girlfriend Jan Svdesen.	
24	At age 92, James Lipton steps down as host of Inside the Actors Studio. When the show completes its move to Ovation from Bravo, where it had aired since 1994, the show will have a series of rotating guest hosts.	
24	Gritty was introduced at the Please Touch Museum.	
25	Bill Cosby is sentenced to three to ten years in prison for his three counts of aggravated indecent assault. Earlier that day, the Television Critics Association rescinded their Career Achievement Award they had awarded him in 2002.	
27	HBO Sports executive vice president Peter Nelson announces that the premium service will be "pivoting away" from carrying live boxing matches after 45 years. Its final scheduled televised match will air on October 27, with a middleweight title fight between Daniel Jacobs and Serhiy Derevyanchenko being held at Madison Square Garden. Nelson cited audience research suggesting that boxing is "no longer a determinant factor for HBO subscribers," with HBO's boxing telecasts having averaged around 820,000 viewers during 2018 (encompassing approximately 2% of its 40 million subscribers); the move also comes as the quality of the fights offered by HBO has declined due to increased competition from outlets such as Showtime and ESPN, along with the recent U.S. launch of sports streaming service DAZN (which has a broadcast agreement with Matchroom Boxing). Of its boxing analysts and commentators (which include Max Kellerman, Harold Lederman, Andre Ward and Roy Jones Jr.), only longtime play-by-play announcer Jim Lampley will remain employed with HBO.	
27	Fox News Channel fires conservative contributor and radio host Kevin Jackson after he made a series of tweets regarding the credibility of Christine Blasey Ford, who on this day was giving testimony to the Senate Judiciary Committee about being sexually assaulted by Supreme Court nominee Brett Kavanaugh when they were teenagers, of which Kavanaugh has repeatedly denied, as well as claims from two more women whose story matches that of Ford's. The since-deleted (but saved by several social media platforms) messages had Jackson constantly making offending remarks while Ford was on television as she gave her detail of the events. The live broadcast hearings from both Ford and Kavanaugh also bought in 20.4 million viewers based on overnight ratings from the major broadcast networks (led by ABC with 3.26 million) and cable news outlets (with Fox News leading the entire day at 5.66 million), while CNN had its biggest day of 2018 and its sixth biggest day of all-time for live streaming with 8.2 million live starts on its website and apps.	
29	The 44th season of Saturday Night Live premieres with Adam Driver as the host and Kanye West as musical guest. The show opened with a re-enactment of the Brett Kavanaugh testimony from two days earlier with Matt Damon portraying the Supreme Court nominee in a cameo appearance. After the show's conclusion, Kanye West ranted in support of President Donald Trump. The speech, which did not air because it occurred after the show signed off, West said he was harassed by SNL personnel for wearing a red "Make America Great Again" hat, a claim refuted by a source to People who said the program had been very accommodating to the musician in the week leading up to air, and was caught off guard by the remarks.	

=== October ===
Date	Event	Source
1–31	Coinciding with the 25th anniversary of the 1993 comedy horror fantasy film Hocus Pocus (whose original cast from the movie will celebrate its 25th anniversary in a special to air on October 20), the Disney-owned cable channel Freeform launches its Halloween programming block 31 Nights of Halloween, which, for the first time since the channel commenced Halloween programming, will air throughout the whole month of October. Launched as 13 Nights of Halloween in 1998 on predecessor Fox Family (and carried over after the channel's subsequent relaunch as ABC Family) following the success of 25 Days of Christmas two years prior, the annual programming block broadcasts horror films and Halloween-based programming, which lasted from October 19 until Halloween night, covering the thirteen days before the holiday.	
1	Viacom names Brian Robbins as the new president of Nickelodeon, succeeding Cyma Zarghami, having most recently worked with the network while at Paramount Players. Robbins – who began his career as an actor (most notably, playing the role of Eric Mardian in the 1986–91 ABC sitcom Head of the Class), before transitioning into television and film production in the early 1990s – is mostly known for his production partnership with Michael Tollin and their considerable output for both Nickelodeon and The WB/The CW (which included such series as All That, Kenan & Kel, The Amanda Show, Smallville, What I Like About You and One Tree Hill).	
1	Altice USA's contract to carry services owned by 21st Century Fox on Optimum and Suddenlink expired on that date. The carriage dispute involved Fox owned-and-operated stations WNYW/New York City, WTXF-TV/Philadelphia, KSAZ-TV/Phoenix, and KRIV/Houston, as well as MyNetworkTV O&Os WWOR-TV/New York City, KUTP/Phoenix, and KTXH/Houston and cable channels FX, FXX, FXM, Fox Sports 1, Fox Sports 2, Fox Deportes, National Geographic Channel, and Nat Geo Wild. A new carriage agreement was reached between Fox and Altice four days later; in the interim, the channels remained available to Optimum and Suddenlink subscribers as Altice and Fox continued negotiations to secure a new contract.	
3	In an interview with the Electronic Urban Report, Damon Wayans announces that he will leave his role as Roger Murtaugh on Lethal Weapon after production concludes on the third season's original 13-episode order in December. Wayans cited the strain of doing episode shoots lasting up to 16 hours per day due to health issues related to his diabetes, and that his role in the Fox action dramedy hampered his personal life (noting the work schedule caused him not to be present for his mother and daughter's recent surgeries). The move comes two weeks after former co-star Clayne Crawford's character Martin Riggs was killed off in the show's season three premiere following his firing in May amid multiple on-set altercations and behind-the-scenes friction with Wayans, with Seann William Scott joining the show as Murtaugh's new partner, Wesley Cole. Crawford had previously explained in an August interview with the Drinkin'Bros podcast that Wayans never wanted to do Lethal Weapon, having previously approached series production company Warner Bros. Television CEO Peter Roth about starring in another series project before being cast in the television adaptation of the action comedy films.	
4	Conan O'Brien hosts his final hour-long show after 25 years across three programs, Late Night with Conan O'Brien, The Tonight Show with Conan O'Brien and Conan, as the latter prepares to transition to a less structured 30-minute format starting in January 2019. As part of the change, it was announced that O'Brien's longtime house band Jimmy Vivino and the Basic Cable Band will no longer appear on the program. O'Brien also announces the launch of a new website that will contain digitally remastered episodes of all three programs.	
5	ABC returns the TGIF programming block to its schedule thirteen years after its second run ended, coinciding with the season premieres of returning comedies Fresh Off the Boat and Speechless (both of which moved to that night from their respective original Tuesday and Wednesday 8:30 p.m. [ET] timeslots), and game show Child Support. Originally running from 1989 to 2000 and again from 2003 to 2005, the block mainly featured situation comedies aimed at a family audience (including among others, Full House, Perfect Strangers, Family Matters, Step by Step, Sabrina the Teenage Witch and Boy Meets World), which served as a lead-in to the network's long-running newsmagazine 20/20.	
5	NBC affiliate KTTC/Rochester, Minnesota, fires multimedia reporter James Bunner for violating company policy that prohibits staff members to cover stories while wearing apparel from political campaigns. The move came after Bunner, who had been at the Quincy Media outlet since December 2017, went on air during the station's newscast wearing a "Make America Great Again" cap while also wearing his KTTC apparel as he was covering President Donald Trump's visit in Rochester on October 4.	
9	The 2018 American Music Awards, with YouTube Music as its first presenting sponsor which were held at the Microsoft Theater in Los Angeles, air on ABC. Tracee Ellis Ross serves as host of the broadcast for the second consecutive year. It also marked the first time in the award's history that the AMAs were held on a Tuesday. The three-hour live ceremony – which focused on several political-related topics, including Swift and comedian-host/award presenter Billy Eichner's messages to Americans, urging them to register and vote for the upcoming 2018 midterm elections on November 6, and Ross wearing an "I'm a Voter" shirt during one of her hosting spiels – delivered a 1.8 rating and 6.5 million total viewers, the lowest viewership average for the ceremony since the 2017 telecast.	
10	Amid the landfall of Hurricane Michael, the storm – which produced Category 4 winds sustained at 155 miles per hour (249 km/h) near its eyewall at the time it moved ashore on the Florida Panhandle coast – renders the majority, if not all, of the television stations in Panama City, Florida, inoperable due to the city's proximity to the eyewall (which made landfall near Mexico Beach, approximately 20 miles [32 km] to the southeast) and its associated strongest winds. Gray Television-owned NBC affiliate WJHG-TV and CBS affiliate WECP-LD were the first broadcast outlets to be affected, as their studio/transmitter link tower (which also housed the main transmitter for ESPN Radio affiliate WGSX) collapsed around 12:00 p.m. CDT, and parts of the roof of their studio facility were torn off. Nexstar Media Group-owned ABC affiliate WMBB subsequently lost its main power and its backup generator around 12:15 p.m. CDT. (In the interim, WMBB provided live coverage from its sister stations WFLA-TV/Tampa and WDHN/Dothan, Alabama – the latter of which, along with Gray-owned CBS affiliate WTVY, was also knocked off-air later that day as Michael passed over the Alabama Wiregrass – on its website and cable feed afterward.)	
14	The CW debuts its new main Sunday prime time lineup – running from 8:00 to 10:00 p.m. ET/PT – consisting of Supergirl (which, for its fourth season, moved to that night from its original Monday slot) and a reboot of the 1998–2006 WB series Charmed. The night was informally reclaimed the prior Sunday (October 7), with the network's annual two-night season lead-off telecast of the iHeartRadio Music Festival, replacing syndicated series or feature film packages, and/or local programs (including in some cases, paid programming) that CW stations had run in the time period. It marked the first time the network has programmed that night since it turned over its previous five-hour Sunday timeslot (a byproduct of The CW's original adoption of co-predecessor The WB's 30-hour weekly base schedule upon the former's 2006 launch) to its affiliates in September 2009. The two hours of programming is in line with The CW's Monday through Friday night schedules, rather than taking the extra hour (7:00 to 8:00 p.m. ET/PT) that the other conventional American broadcast networks traditionally program on Sunday evenings – the first such instance of a major network not programming that hour since a 1975 revision to the now-repealed Prime Time Access Rule reserved it for network content – to avoid any competition with the NFL.	
16	Sinclair Broadcast Group signs an agreement with Jukin Media to assume operational responsibilities for its digital content-focused multicast network TBD, effective immediately. The agreement will also result in the expansion of Jukin-supplied content on TBD's programming lineup. The operational agreement replaces a programming content deal involving QYOU Media that Sinclair's digital content unit, Sinclair Digital Group, agreed to terminate on September 13, which (since the network's launch in February 2017) had seen the former supply sampler blocks of short-form digital video content seen on its namesake international premium service The QYOU for broadcast during TBD's daytime, evening and overnight lineups.	
16	The 2018 BET Hip Hop Awards are aired from the Jackie Gleason Theater with DeRay Davis hosting.	
17	Caroll Spinney, the performer of Big Bird and Oscar the Grouch on Sesame Street from its inception in 1969, announced his retirement from the children's television program effective this week. His final scenes in the roles will air as part of the show's landmark 50th season. Matt Vogel and Eric Jacobson will then take over as Big Bird and Oscar respectively.	
24	A series of suspicious packages are sent to numerous individuals that are associated with the Democratic Party (including Barack Obama and Hillary Clinton) or those with liberal views and causes. CNN is also among the many targets that also received the packages at its New York studios, addressed to former CIA Director John O. Brennan, who now works at NBC News and MSNBC but has appeared as a commentator on CNN in the past, and another to former Director of National Intelligence James Clapper. The Time Warner Center was evacuated, with shows based there taking their crews outdoors to broadcast. The investigation is being treated a federal crime and has been condemned by both the media and political parties. The NYPD said the device sent to CNN appears to be a crude pipe bomb. A third package was sent to its Atlanta headquarters later that week. A suspect was arrested in Florida on October 26 and charged with five federal crimes.	
26	NBC cancels Megyn Kelly Today, three days after host Megyn Kelly made comments suggesting it was acceptable for white people to dress in blackface for Halloween "as long as it was respectful and part of a Halloween costume." Kelly apologized the following day, on what would be the show's final taping. NBC News will return to the practice of having Today anchors host in what was Kelly's timeslot, with it being rebranded Today Third Hour, while it determines whether she will remain with the network.	
27	NBC News White House correspondent Peter Alexander is named as the new co-anchor of the Saturday edition of Today, succeeding Craig Melvin, who left the NBC morning program's Saturday edition in August to focus on his work at the program's weekday edition (he was promoted as the program's news anchor on September 4) and the 11:00 a.m. (ET) edition of MSNBC's MSNBC Live.	
28	Fox News announces that Chris Farrell, a member of the Judicial Watch organization's board of directors, has been banned from both their news and business channels, including their websites, and all appearances featuring him were removed immediately. The move comes after Farrell went on Lou Dobbs Tonight's October 25 broadcast, where he made a claim that billionaire George Soros was funding a "migrant caravan" that has been heading towards the Mexico–United States border, of which Fox saw the comments as anti-Semitic, since Soros was one of the 14 individuals who was a target of a failed bomb plot attempt the same week the segment aired (and just two days before a mass shooting at a synagogue in Pittsburgh).	
28	Fox broadcasts Game 5 of the World Series. The Boston Red Sox defeat the Los Angeles Dodgers. This is their 9th and most recent title in franchise history. This Sox team was considered the best like the 1998 Yankees due to their 100-win record that was never achieved since 1946. As for the Dodgers, they lost two consecutive World Series exactly 40 years apart to their 1977 and 1978 counterparts. They are also the first team with back-to-back World Series losses since the Texas Rangers in 2010 and 2011. The Red Sox's latest series victory turned them the first MLB team with most world championships in the 21st century.	
29	Evening Post Industries announces the sale of subsidiary Cordillera Communications' fifteen television stations, in order to focus around its newspaper properties and health care, marketing and real estate interests. The E. W. Scripps Company will purchase fourteen stations – NBC affiliates WLEX-TV/Lexington, KOAA-TV/Pueblo–Colorado Springs and KSBY/San Luis Obispo, ABC affiliate KATC/Lafayette, Louisiana; the Montana Television Network; and the Corpus Christi virtual triopoly of NBC affiliate KRIS-TV, Telemundo affiliate K22JA-D and CBS-affiliated sister KZTV for $521 million. Cordillera will separately sell NBC affiliate KVOA/Tucson to Quincy Media for $70 million.	
30	Nexstar Media Group reaches an agreement to purchase KFVE/Honolulu and satellites KGMD-TV/Hilo and KGMV/Wailuku from MCG Capital Corporation and American Spirit Media for $6.5 million. The terms of the acquisition – which would create a duopoly with Fox affiliate KHON-TV (which Nexstar has owned since January 2017) – include a time brokerage agreement, under which Nexstar will assume certain managerial services to KFVE that had been provided by Raycom Media, which itself will continue to provide other services not covered by the Nexstar TBA on a transitional basis. KFVE's syndicated and local programming – sans its MyNetworkTV affiliation – will shift to a subchannel of either KHNL or KGMB, with its Bounce TV affiliation moving from KFVE-DT2 to KGMB-DT4. The deal, which rectifies an ownership conflict related to Raycom's pending purchase of Gray Television, is expected to receive regulatory approval in the first quarter of 2019.	
31	In an unexpected moment on American morning television, ABC's Good Morning America and NBC's Today celebrate Halloween with their respective 1980s-themed costume reveal parties, where the programs' anchors and hosts dressed up as different iconic TV and movie characters and music artists from that decade.	
31	Quincy Media announced that it will acquire Harrisburg, Illinois-licensed ABC affiliate WSIL-TV and Poplar Bluff, Missouri, satellite KPOB-TV from Mel Wheeler, Inc. for $24.5 million. WSIL would be Quincy's fourth station in its home state of Illinois.	
31	Dish Network and Sling TV drop HBO and Cinemax from their services, the first drop of any HBO network by any provider for retransmission consent issues in HBO's 46-year history, despite HBO asking for an extension in negotiations. Dish Network blames the blackout on HBO's purchase by AT&T, also the owner of rival DirecTV, with one Dish executive stating the move was a ploy to "steal away customers." Both Dish and Sling provide HDNet Movies as a replacement, along with appropriate customer credits as the dispute goes on.	

=== November ===
Date	Event	Source
3	During a bit on Saturday Night Live's "Weekend Update", cast member Pete Davidson offers mocking commentary of Dan Crenshaw, a former Navy SEAL who lost an eye in combat and won a seat in the United States House of Representatives as a Republican from Texas the next week. Several conservatives, including Crenshaw, took exception to the bit, with the National Republican Congressional Committee coming back at Davidson by referencing his breakup with pop singer Ariana Grande. Crenshaw appeared on Weekend Update the following week and Davidson apologized to him in person and was then criticized about his breakup with Grande, and other issues, by Crenshaw.	
5	NBCUniversal, CNN, Fox News and Fox Business announce they are pulling an ad from the Trump Campaign that focuses on the "7,000-migrant caravan" crossing Mexico that has been in the news — and the subject of many of President Trump's tweets and rally speeches — in recent days. The ad also spotlights Luis Bracamontes, an undocumented immigrant who was convicted of murdering two sheriff's deputies in California in 2014, and plays a clip of him seeming to brag about the killings: "Only thing that I regret is that I just killed two." The ad ran during NBC's Sunday Night Football on November 4, only to receive major backlash from viewers, who saw the ad as racist, prompting NBC to pull it from all of their platforms, including MSNBC and CNBC. The National Football League's media committee had veto power over the offending ad, citing its policy that prohibits "social cause/issue advocacy advertising" unless approved in advance, and the league prohibiting advertising for guns, contraceptives, fireworks, cannabis, "male enhancement" products and "energy drinks."	
6	The Late Show with Stephen Colbert, Late Night with Seth Meyers, and The Daily Show with Trevor Noah aired special live episodes to cover the results of the midterm elections.	
6	Nathan M. Johnson, a music composer for television programs (notably in particular the American episodes and theme song for Dragon Ball Z), wins a seat in the Texas State Senate's 16th district. Johnson, a Democrat who also holds a magna cum laude from the University of Arizona with a degree in physics, a law degree from the University of Texas at Austin, and does volunteering for victims of domestic violence while attending college, will succeed Republican incumbent Don Huffines in the Dallas suburban area.	
7	On the day after the midterms, the White House revokes the press credentials of Jim Acosta hours after a press conference in which President Trump argued with the CNN correspondent. White House press secretary Sarah Huckabee Sanders cited Acosta coming into contact with an intern who tried to take the microphone from him – Acosta's arm accidentally came into contact with the intern's while he moved to shield it from being taken – as reason for the suspension. CNN, individual journalists and several major journalism advocacy groups denounced the move. CNN filed a lawsuit against the Trump Administration in the United States District Court for the District of Columbia on November 13 to reverse the administration's decision on grounds that the decision violated Acosta's press freedom rights under the First Amendment, due process rights under the Fifth Amendment and the Administrative Procedure Act. Judge Timothy J. Kelly – a Trump appointee to the D.C. District Court who presided over the case – ruled in favor of CNN on November 16, ordering Acosta's credentials to be reinstated immediately, a ruling signaling that CNN likely would prevail in other aspects of the case. CNN dropped the lawsuit on November 19 after the White House returned Acosta's press pass.	
8	Authorities in Baxter County, Arkansas, arrest 39-year-old Benjamin Craig Matthews on suspicion of making 40 calls to CNN in which he allegedly harassed the network and made death threats against at least one unidentified reporter, including multiple counts of felony terroristic threatening and multiple counts of misdemeanor harassing communications, of which occurred between October 31 and November 2. Matthews is also accused of making calls to another unidentified television network and to various public officials and organizations.	
9	Production on several television shows and projects are put on hold due to the ongoing Woolsey Fire that has consumed portions of Los Angeles County, California, and burned over 35,000 acres of land. Among the properties that became casualties of the fire includes the 91-year-old Paramount Ranch studios and the mansion where The Bachelor is filmed.	
11	With the Democrats ready to make preparations to control the United States House of Representatives in January 2019, several key members have taken to Sunday morning talk shows to signal indications that they might look into President Donald Trump's ongoing criticisms of media organizations and whether he is violating any laws based on his constant Twitter feeds and his on air press conferences. The move comes in the wake of Trump's decision to revoke CNN reporter Jim Acosta's White House credentials and his threat to remove more reporters, his opposition to CNN parent Time Warner's merger with AT&T, and his battle with Jeff Bezos (and his criticisms against The Washington Post and Amazon).	
11	The 44th People's Choice Awards airs on E!. It's the first People's Choice ceremony to air on a network other than CBS, as well as the first time the ceremony airs late in the calendar year.	
14	The 52nd Country Music Association Awards aired on ABC with Brad Paisley and Carrie Underwood returning as hosts.	
16	Channing Dungey announces she will step down as president of ABC Entertainment, with Karey Burke, head of original programming at ABC-owned Freeform, tapped to succeed her. Dungey had been with ABC for 14 years, and in 2016 became the first African-American to head a broadcast network. Her departure comes ahead of ABC parent Disney's completing its acquisition of many of 21st Century Fox's cable TV and production assets.	
19	iHeartMedia's syndicated Country music morning show host Bobby Bones and partner Sharna Burgess are crowned winners of the 27th season of Dancing with the Stars. Bones is the first radio personality in the series to win the Mirrorball, and the first win for dancer Burgess.	
20	Apollo Global Management, KKR, Blackstone Group, Sinclair Broadcast Group, Tegna Media, and Amazon have emerged as candidates interested in acquiring the 22 Fox regional sports networks that regulators have said The Walt Disney Company must divest as part of its acquisition of large parts of 21st Century Fox, estimated to be worth $20 billion. The sale would exclude YES Network, which airs New York Yankees, Brooklyn Nets, and New York City Football Club soccer games, that could end up back under full control of the Yankees baseball club, which owns a 20 percent stake, as the Yankees and a sovereign wealth fund have submitted bids for the YES Network.	
21	Liberman Broadcasting, the owners of Estrella TV and its 11 O&Os, file for Chapter 11 bankruptcy, stating that it has outstanding funded debt obligations in the aggregate amount of approximately $530 million. The Spanish/multicultural broadcaster's lien lender, HPS Investment Partners is involved in litigation with an ad hoc group of its second lien noteholders, as well as seeking approval of up to $38 million in debtor-in-possession financing. it also has issues with creditors TMI Trust Company ($27,954,755), US Bank NA ($8,464,963), ASCAP ($1,977,292), and The A.C. Nielsen Company (Nielsen Media Research with $1,063,095 and Nielsen Audio with $532,798).	
22	A panel/pundit segment on Fox News is brought to an abrupt halt when Turning Point USA's director of Spanish engagement Anna Paulina compares 2016 Democratic presidential candidate Hillary Clinton to herpes in a discussion about her email controversy. Hour host Rick Leventhal quickly chastised her comment and ended her feed, continuing the conversation with only analyst Douglas Schoen. Leventhal later apologized for Paulina's comment, with fellow host Arthel Neville also doing so, saying 'we are all Americans...and we want to reiterate that we do not condone the language that Anna Paulina just displayed here, and we apologize to Secretary Clinton for that; Fox News does not condone her sentiment.'	
22	A same-sex kiss takes place during a broadcast of the Macy's Thanksgiving Day Parade. The moment occurred during a performance from the Broadway musical The Prom, with the lead stars Caitlin Kinnunen and Isabelle McCalla (who play the Indiana teenagers who make headlines when their local PTA cancelled their high school prom and they fight back against the ban because of their decision to go the prom together) embraced and kissed each other during the performance. Meanwhile, a few musical artists – most notably, English singer Rita Ora (who performed the single "Let You Love Me") – experienced technical difficulties during their performances on the floats, sparking widespread criticism from viewers on social media.	
23	Due to technical difficulties, Turner Sports's Bleacher Report Live issues refunds of $19.95, plus state sales tax, to customers who had purchased a pay per view golf contest between Tiger Woods and Phil Mickelson, known simply as The Match, after buyers had been unable to log on to its website to watch it via that means; Turner decided to open up the paywall in response, allowing anyone to watch for free online. Turner Sports parent AT&T also issued refunds to DirecTV and U-verse customers, as did Spectrum, Comcast, Cox Communications, and Dish Network/Sling TV who had purchased it through cable's In Demand and DirecTV/Dish's pay per view systems.	
26	The Rankin/Bass Productions library of holiday specials that had spent the previous 20 years on the Family Channel and Freeform and had previously been the cornerstones of that channel's "25 Days of Christmas" block move to AMC, where they air as part of that channel's "Best Christmas Ever" block.	
27	Fox News Channel launches a stand-alone subscription streaming service based on its mixed user-generated content/opinion Fox Nation site, which offers political commentary and opinion programming aimed at Fox News "superfans" that supplements those seen on the cable network. The service features live exclusive content and long-form programming, exclusive events and archived Fox News programs. The first of these efforts is the daily First/Final Thoughts opinion commentary from pundit Tomi Lahren.	
29	CNN dismisses professor/author/activist Marc Lamont Hill as a contributor after remarks he made during a speech before the United Nations observing the International Day of Solidarity with the Palestinian People concerning the occupation of Palestinians by the Israeli government, in which he said that those seeking a two-state solution to the unrest must "commit to political action, grass-roots action, local action and international action [to work toward] a free Palestine from the river to the sea". CNN representatives did not provide reasoning for his firing (although it was alleged his use of the "from the river to the sea," a phrase used by members of the militant group Hamas may have precipitated it), which received criticism from pro-Palestinian activists, who accused the network of caving to pressure from pro-Israeli groups.	
30	Fox News issues an apology for comments made by musician and Trump supporter Kid Rock, who was appearing on Fox & Friends during an interview with Steve Doocy, in which Rock made a remark about political correctness, only to add a reference: "People need to calm down, get a little less politically correct. And, I would say, you know, love everybody, except — I'd say screw that Joy Behar bitch. ... I mean lady. Lady." Doocy then told Rock that line was inappropriate: "You cannot say that... We apologize for that. Listen, she's just got a different point of view than you do." Rock said that it was meant as a joke but after Doocy asked him to apologize, Rock's mixed response was "I did apologize for the language, not the sentiment." (The latter a reference to Behar's criticism over his 2017 visit to the White House with Ted Nugent and Sarah Palin that included the photo with the trio in front of a portrait of Hillary Clinton); Doocy then apologize to viewers for Rock's tepid response: "We don't feel that way. We apologize for both." Later in the day, the hosts of The View responded to Rock's comments, with Behar challenging Rock to come on the show and have a beer with "These Bitches."	
30	The studios of KTVA/Anchorage, Alaska, suffer severe damage after major earthquakes hit the city. Much of the damage was sustained to the CBS affiliate's news and production facilities (including damage to ceiling tiles, piping and HVAC machinery in the newsroom, flooding from broken pipes and malfunctioning sprinklers, and the station's tape archive (which included footage from the inaugural Iditarod in 1973) being knocked over into a pile in one storage room); one KTVA reporter stated that portions of the facility were "absolutely destroyed." Other television and radio stations (including NBC affiliate KTUU and the duopoly of ABC affiliate KYUR and Fox affiliate KTBY) were also briefly knocked off the air following the quake.	
30	21st Century Fox and the producers of the National Geographic show Cosmos: A Spacetime Odyssey announce they are investigating sexual harassment claims against Neil deGrasse Tyson by three women.	

=== December ===
Date	Event	Source
1	Tegna and Dish Network reach a multi-year carriage agreement hours after Tegna's 47 owned and/or operated television stations were removed from the satellite provider, after it rejected Dish's offer of a short-term extension to a retransmission consent agreement that expired at midnight (ET) on this date, which would have included a retroactive true-up when a new fee rate was agreed upon.	
2	The 2018 Victoria's Secret Fashion Show is broadcast on ABC. The 2018 edition marked the show's move to ABC – which aired the event's inaugural network television broadcast in 2001 – after having aired on CBS for the previous fifteen years. 3.3 million people tune in, giving it the lowest viewership in the fashion show's televised history until the 2024 show which amassed 2.67 million viewers.	
3	Nexstar Media Group announces it will acquire Tribune Media in an all-cash deal valued at $6.4 billion, including the assumption of outstanding debt held by Tribune. The deal – which is expected to close late in the third quarter of 2019 – would make Nexstar the largest television station operator by total number of stations, although Nexstar intends to divest certain stations to address conflicting properties (with stations in fifteen markets, including two where Nexstar may legally retain overlapping stations not subject to FCC cross-ownership rules, being targeted for immediate divestiture to independent groups) and to comply with the 39% national ownership cap and may also divest other "non-core" assets (likely including WGN Radio/Chicago). It will also mark the group's entry into network ownership through the acquisition of digital multicast networks Antenna TV and (Tribune's 50% share in) This TV, cable channels WGN America and CLTV and Tribune's 31% interest in TV Food Network LLC.	
4	Adam Levine faced a media backlash during the live shows for the fifteenth season of The Voice after the elimination of his team member DeAndre Nico (and Dave Fenley from Team Blake Shelton) as a result of the Instant Save twist (a twist which involve Twitter's tweets and votes from the official show's app saving a contestant from elimination) for Reagan Strange, after she refused to perform a song as part of the Save due to health, and Levine boycotting the bottom three contestants by a controversial comment between his two contestants from his team, resulting in a backlash from his supporters. Strange would eventually be eliminated on the following week's semifinals a week later, and the aftereffects of the controversy even applied onto the following season in February 2019 (the last season to feature Levine) whereas every last of his team members were eliminated quickly before reaching the semifinals (which also occurred on seasons three, four and fourteen, in which none of his contestants advanced to represent Levine in the live finals); the backlash might have also led to his eventual departure of the series after 16 seasons of broadcast, leaving Shelton as the only coach to appear in all the seasons.	
5	Major networks cover the state funeral of President George H. W. Bush. All former presidents (Carter, Clinton, Bush Jr., Obama) as well as then-current president Trump, Vice President Pence, and future President Biden are in attendance. Also in attendance are the living first ladies and former vice presidents.	
6	CNN evacuates the Time Warner Center during a commercial break of CNN Tonight with Don Lemon after a bomb threat was called into the building. Lemon, along with media correspondent Brian Stelter and crime and justice reporter Shimon Prokupecz later continued the broadcast outdoors.	
7	Fox Sports announces it has acquired the rights to use John Tesh's "Roundball Rock" as its theme for select college basketball games, beginning with a tripleheader the following day. The song is best known for its use on NBC's NBA telecasts from 1990 to 2002, later adopted for Olympic basketball by NBC; this also breaks from Fox's use of themes composed by Scott Schreer for all of its other sportscasts.	
10	After 58 years of ownership, CBS sells its 25-acre CBS Television City property in the Fairfax District of Los Angeles, as well as its soundstage operation and the rights to the Television City trademark, to real estate developer Hackman Capital Partners for $750 million. The building will continue to produce television programs there for the next five years. CBS will continue to use the company's 40-acre CBS Studio Center in Studio City, which is a full-service production facility with 18 sound stages and over 210,000 square feet of office space.	
14	Pacific Life removes their advertising from Fox News Channel's Tucker Carlson Tonight after Carlson suggested during a segment he did the previous evening that mass immigration makes the United States "dirtier", citing disagreement with Carlson's statements. The next week saw more advertisers (up to 16 as of December 19) ask to remove their advertising from the program as Carlson refuses to back down from the statement, with IHOP, Bowflex, Samsung, Pfizer and SodaStream pulling their spots altogether. The network blames Media Matters for America, MoveOn, and Sleeping Giants for pressuring advertisers to pull their spots from Carlson, of which the three groups have denied any involvement in the sponsors' decision.	
14	Stoney Westmoreland, who plays Henry "Ham" Mack on the Disney Channel series Andi Mack, is fired from the series due to his arrest for allegedly trying to arrange a sexual liaison with a 13-year-old boy he met online.	
16	The Miss Universe 2018 pageant, held in Bangkok, Thailand, aired on Fox and Azteca, with Steve Harvey returning as host. Catriona Gray of the Philippines is crowned the winner of this year's event.	
18	Charter Communications agrees to refund a pool of $62.5 million to 700,000 customers, and provide premium channels at no charge to 2.2 million active Spectrum customers in New York State to settle a consumer fraud lawsuit filed by the Attorney General of New York in February 2017, valued at $174 million, which represents the largest-ever payout to consumers by a cable/Internet operator in U.S. history, turning back an attempt by the state's Public Service Commission to revoke Charter's operating ability throughout the state entirely. This includes refunds for customers who continued to rent out-of-date cable modems and router/modem combos without being notified to upgrade to current-day DOCSIS 3.0+-compatible devices with better speeds, and/or who continued to subscribe to out-of-date legacy 100 Mbit/s and lower cable internet services dating back to before Time Warner Cable was merged into Charter (most of the issues dated back to before Charter's merger, including Time Warner Cable's tactics involving interconnection payments with third-party video services such as Netflix; Charter inherited these issues and traditionally has not had data caps and network restrictions, which they have continued as part of their merger conditions, but had issues applying to within New York). Settlements will include free premium services for 3–6 months, additional investments into their Internet services, and more disclosures in its advertising about actual speeds with their services.	
18	Alfonso Ribeiro files a lawsuit against Epic Games and Take-Two Interactive, respectively the makers of Fortnite and NBA 2K, alleging the popular video games appropriated the dance made famous on the 1990s series The Fresh Prince of Bel-Air by Ribeiro's character Carlton Banks. Ribeiro was also in the process of filling paperwork to have the intellectual property rights copyrighted. "The Dance (is) inextricably linked to Ribeiro's identity, celebrity and likeness," his lawyers claim. Ribeiro, now the host of America's Funniest Home Videos, is the latest to accuse Epic Games of stealing ideas, 2 Milly and "Backpack Kid" Russell Horning have also filed suit for use of their dance moves.	
22	During a radio/television simulcast of a game between the Buffalo Sabres and Anaheim Ducks on MSG Western New York, Sabres broadcaster Rick Jeanneret suffers a medical emergency and abruptly cuts out of the broadcast, leaving color commentator Rob Ray and on-site studio host Brian Duff to call play-by-play for the remainder of the game. Jeanneret is in his 47th season with the Sabres.	
31	The Committee to Protect Journalists is named by Times Square Alliance and Countdown Entertainment as this year's honored charity at the annual New Year's Eve Times Square Ball drop.	

== Awards ==
Category/Organization	76th Golden Globe Awards January 6, 2019	9th Critics' Choice Television Awards January 13, 2019	Producers Guild and Screen Actors Guild Awards January 19–27, 2019	71st Primetime Emmy Awards September 22, 2019
Best Drama Series	The Americans			Game of Thrones
Best Comedy Series	The Kominsky Method	The Marvelous Mrs. Maisel		Fleabag
Best Limited Series	The Assassination of Gianni Versace: American Crime Story			Chernobyl
Best Actor in a Drama Series	Richard Madden; Bodyguard	Matthew Rhys; The Americans	Jason Bateman; Ozark	Billy Porter; Pose
Best Actress in a Drama Series	Sandra Oh; Killing Eve			Jodie Comer; Killing Eve
Best Supporting Actor in a Drama Series	—N/a	Noah Emmerich; The Americans	—N/a	Peter Dinklage; Game of Thrones
Best Supporting Actress in a Drama Series	—N/a	Thandie Newton; Westworld	—N/a	Julia Garner; Ozark
Best Actor in a Comedy Series	Michael Douglas; The Kominsky Method	Bill Hader; Barry	Tony Shalhoub; The Marvelous Mrs. Maisel	Bill Hader; Barry
Best Actress in a Comedy Series	Rachel Brosnahan; The Marvelous Mrs. Maisel			Phoebe Waller-Bridge; Fleabag
Best Supporting Actor in a Comedy Series	—N/a	Henry Winkler; Barry	—N/a	Tony Shalhoub; The Marvelous Mrs. Maisel
Best Supporting Actress in a Comedy Series	—N/a	Alex Borstein; The Marvelous Mrs. Maisel	—N/a	Alex Borstein; The Marvelous Mrs. Maisel
Best Actor in a Limited Series	Darren Criss; The Assassination of Gianni Versace: American Crime Story			Jharrel Jerome; When They See Us
Best Actress in a Limited Series	Patricia Arquette; Escape at Dannemora	Patricia Arquette; Escape at Dannemora (tie); Amy Adams; Sharp Objects (tie)	Patricia Arquette; Escape at Dannemora	Michelle Williams; Fosse/Verdon
Best Supporting Actor in a Limited Series	Ben Whishaw; A Very English Scandal		—N/a	Ben Whishaw; A Very English Scandal
Best Supporting Actress in a Limited Series	Patricia Clarkson; Sharp Objects		—N/a	Patricia Arquette; The Act

== Television programs ==
=== Television films and specials ===
These television films and specials are scheduled to premiere in 2018. The premiere dates may be changed depending on a variety of factors.

First aired	Title	Channel	Source
February 16	Zombies	Disney Channel	
February 19	Blurt!	Nickelodeon	
March 4	Billy Graham: An Extraordinary Journey	Fox	
March 26	The Zen Diaries of Garry Shandling	HBO	
April 1	Jesus Christ Superstar Live in Concert	NBC	
April 7	Paterno	HBO	
May 11	Meghan Markle: An American Princess	Fox	
June 28	Alone in the Game	Audience	
July 16	Culture Shock: Freaks and Geeks: The Documentary	A&E	
July 29	Comedy Central Roast of Bruce Willis	Comedy Central	
August 10	Freaky Friday	Disney Channel	
August 19	The Last Sharknado: It's About Time	Syfy	
September 8	Sofia the First: Forever Royal	Disney Junior	
September 10	Sofia the First: Forever Royal	Disney Channel	
September 9	The Bad Seed	Lifetime	
September 16	No One Would Tell	Lifetime	
September 30	Marvel Rising: Secret Warriors	Disney Channel/ Disney XD	
October 14	Harvey Birdman, Attorney General	Adult Swim	
October 20	Hocus Pocus 25th Anniversary Halloween Bash	Freeform	
October 22	WWE Road to Evolution	USA Network	
October 29	A Very Wicked Halloween: Celebrating 15 Years on Broadway	NBC	
November 4	Mickey's 90th Spectacular	ABC	
November 10	When You Wish Upon a Pickle	HBO	
November 22	The Christmas Contract	Lifetime	
November 22	'Tis the Season: A One Tree Hill Cast Reunion	Lifetime	
November 22	Meghan's New Life: The Real Princess Diaries	ABC	
November 22	I'm Coming Home	ABC	
November 28	A Legendary Christmas with John and Chrissy	NBC	
November 29	Lego Jurassic World: The Secret Exhibit	NBC	
November 29	The Wonderful World of Disney: Magical Holiday Celebration	ABC	
December 1	Disney Parks Presents a 25 Days of Christmas Holiday Party	Disney Channel	
December 2	Garth: Live at Notre Dame	CBS	
December 2	Life-Size 2	Freeform	
December 10	No Sleep 'Til Christmas	Freeform	
December 11	Darci Lynne: My Hometown Christmas	NBC	
December 19	New Day's WWE 2018 Pancake Powered Year End Super Spectacular	USA Network	
December 28	Black Mirror: Bandersnatch	Netflix	

=== Miniseries ===
First aired	Title	Channel	Source
January 24	Waco	Paramount Network	
January 30	Citizen Rose	E!	
February 28	The Looming Tower	Hulu	
April 8	Howards End	Starz	
April 16	It Was Him: The Many Murders of Ed Edwards	Paramount Network	
May 13	This is Life Live	TLC	
July 8	Sharp Objects	HBO	
July 8	The 2000s	CNN	
July 30	Rest in Power: The Trayvon Martin Story	Paramount Network	
September 21	Maniac	Netflix	
October 12	The Haunting of Hill House	Netflix	
November 18	Escape at Dannemora	Showtime	
November 18	My Brilliant Friend	HBO	
December 5	Border Live	Discovery Channel	

=== Programs changing networks ===
Show	Moved from	Moved to	Source
Comedians in Cars Getting Coffee	Crackle	Netflix	
Cloudy with a Chance of Meatballs	Cartoon Network	Boomerang	
Mysticons	Nickelodeon	Nicktoons	
Welcome to the Wayne	Nickelodeon	Nicktoons	
People's Choice Awards	CBS	E!	
Billboard Music Awards	ABC	NBC	
Last Man Standing	ABC	Fox	
American Idol	Fox	ABC	
FIFA World Cup	ABC/ESPN (English); Univision/UDN (Spanish)	Fox/FS1 (English); Telemundo/Universo (Spanish)	
Thomas & Friends	PBS Kids	Nickelodeon	
ESPN FC	ESPN2	ESPN+	
DuckTales	Disney XD	Disney Channel	
Big Hero 6: The Series	Disney XD	Disney Channel	
S. E. Cupp Unfiltered	HLN	CNN	
Winter Break: Hunter Mountain	MTV	MTV2	
Thursday Night Football	CBS/NBC	Fox	
Nobodies	TV Land	Paramount Network	
Nobodies	Paramount Network	TV Land	
Unreal	Lifetime	Hulu	
Safeword	MTV	VH1	
Carpool Karaoke: The Series	Apple Music	Apple TV app	
Victoria's Secret Fashion Show	CBS	ABC	
Charmed	The WB	The CW	

=== Programs returning in 2018 ===
The following shows will return with new episodes after being canceled, ended their run previously, or underwent a hiatus that lasted at least one year:

Show	Last aired	Type of Return	Previous channel	New/returning/same channel	Return date	Source
The McLaughlin Group	2016	Revival	Syndication/PBS	same	January 7	
Beat the Clock	2003	Family version	Pax TV (as an adult game show)	Universal Kids	February 6	
Queer Eye	2007	Reboot	Bravo	Netflix	February 7	
Showtime at the Apollo	2008	Revival	Syndication	Fox	March 1	
American Chopper	2012	Revival	TLC	Discovery Channel	March 1	
Bridezillas	2013	Revival	WEtv	same	March 2	
American Idol	2016	Revival	Fox	ABC	March 11	
Timeless	2017	New season and wrap-up movie	NBC	same	March 11	
Muppet Babies	1991	Reboot	CBS	Disney Channel/Disney Junior	March 23	
Roseanne	1997	Revival	ABC	same	March 27	
Jersey Shore (as Jersey Shore: Family Vacation)	2012	Revival	MTV	same	April 5	
Trading Spaces	2008	Revival	TLC	same	April 7	
Lost in Space	1968	Reboot	CBS	Netflix	April 13	
BattleBots	2016	Revival	ABC	Discovery Channel/Science	May 11	
Iron Chef America	2014	New season	Food Network	same	May 20	
Arrested Development	2013	New season	Netflix	same	May 29	
FLCL	2001/2003	New season	Adult Swim	same	June 2	
The Staircase	2013	New episodes	Sundance TV	Netflix	June 8	
Double Dare	2000	Revival	Nickelodeon	same	June 25	
Hit the Floor	2016	New season	VH1	BET	July 10	
Bug Juice (as Bug Juice: My Adventures at Camp)	2001	Revival	Disney Channel	same	July 16	
In Search of...	2002	Revival	Sci-Fi Channel	History Channel	July 20	
The Contender	2009	Revival	Versus	Epix	August 24	
Billy on the Street	2017	Revival	TruTV	YouTube	September 13	
Magnum, P.I.	1988	Reboot	CBS	same	September 24	
Murphy Brown	1998	Revival	CBS	same	September 27	
Last Man Standing	2017	Revival	ABC	Fox	September 28	
Charmed	2006	Reboot	The WB	The CW	October 14	
She-Ra: Princess of Power (as She-Ra and the Princesses of Power)	1986	Reboot	Syndication	Netflix	November 16	
Deal or No Deal	2010	Revival	Syndication	CNBC	December 5 (informally returned on December 3 with NBC holiday special)	

=== Milestone episodes ===
Show	Network	Episode #	Episode title	Episode airdate	Source
Modern Family	ABC	200th	"Dear Beloved Family"	January 10	
The Tonight Show Starring Jimmy Fallon	NBC	800th	"Sam Rockwell/Tig Notaro"	January 11	
Family Guy	Fox	300th	"Dog Bites Bear"	January 14	
The Amazing World of Gumball	Cartoon Network	200th	"The Vegging"	January 15	
The Blacklist	NBC	100th	"Abraham Stern"	January 17	
Total Divas	E!	100th	"Breaking the News"	January 31	
Mom	CBS	100th	"Pushed-Down Coffee, and a Working Turn Signal"	February 1	
General Hospital	ABC	14,000th	"Episode 14,000"	February 23	
Chicago P.D.	NBC	100th	"Profiles"	March 7	
Agents of S.H.I.E.L.D.	ABC	100th	"The Real Deal"	March 9	
The Fosters	Freeform	100th	"Just Say Yes"	March 13	
The Simpsons	Fox	636th	"Forgive and Regret"	April 29	
Chrisley Knows Best	USA Network	100th	"Celebrating A Chrisley Century"	June 19	
Power Rangers	Nickelodeon	25th Anniversary	"Dimensions in Danger"	August 28	
Big Brother	CBS	700th	"Episode 34"	September 12	
Shameless	Showtime	100th	"Do Right, Vote White!"	September 30	
Bob's Burgers	Fox	150th	"Just One of the Boyz 4 Now for Now"	September 30	
Criminal Minds	CBS	300th	"300"	October 3	
Shark Tank	ABC	200th	TBA	October 7	
WWE SmackDown	USA Network	1,000th	WWE SmackDown 1000	October 16	
NCIS: New Orleans	CBS	100th	"In the Blood"	October 23	
WWE 205 Live	WWE Network	100th	"#100"	October 24	
Hawaii Five-0	CBS	200th	"Pua A'e La Ka Uwahi O Ka Moe"	November 9	
Black-ish	ABC	100th	"Good Grief"	November 20	
The Flash	The CW	100th	"What's Past Is Prologue"	December 4	
Madam Secretary	CBS	100th	"Family Separation: Part 1"	December 23	

=== Programs ending in 2018 ===
End date	Show	Channel	First aired	Status	Source
January 4	Ghost Wars	Syfy	2017	Cancelled	
January 6	Ten Days in the Valley	ABC	2017	Cancelled	
January 9	Major Crimes	TNT	2012	Ended	
January 12	Disjointed	Netflix	2017	Cancelled	
January 13	Cashin' In	Fox News	2001	Ended	
January 13	Cavuto on Business	Fox News	2002	Ended	
January 13	Forbes on Fox	Fox News	2002	Ended	
January 14	Wisdom of the Crowd	CBS	2017	Cancelled	
January 18	Damnation	USA Network	2017	Cancelled	
January 20	Pickle and Peanut	Disney XD	2015	Ended	
January 25	Great News	NBC	2017	Cancelled	
January 26	The Adventures of Puss in Boots	Netflix	2015	Ended	
January 29	Valor	The CW	2017	Cancelled	
January 29	The Brave	NBC	2017	Cancelled	
February 2	K.C. Undercover	Disney Channel	2015	Ended	
February 5	9JKL	CBS	2017	Cancelled	
February 5	Better Late Than Never	NBC	2016	Cancelled	
February 7	The Librarians	TNT	2014	Cancelled	
February 10	Bunsen Is a Beast	Nicktoons	2017	Ended	
February 11	After Trek	CBS All Access	2017	Cancelled	
February 16	Mozart in the Jungle	Amazon Video	2014	Cancelled	
February 16	DreamWorks Dragons	Netflix	2012	Cancelled	
February 16	Everything Sucks!	Netflix	2018	Cancelled	
February 23	Seven Seconds	Netflix	2018	Cancelled	
February 28	MythBusters	Discovery Channel	2003	Ended	
March 5	Star Wars Rebels	Disney XD	2014	Ended	
March 6	Kevin (Probably) Saves the World	ABC	2017	Cancelled	
March 9	Love	Netflix	2016	Ended	
March 10	Falling Water	USA Network	2016	Cancelled	
March 12	Tom vs Time	Facebook Watch	2018	Ended	
March 21	The X-Files (returning to Hulu)	Fox	1993	Cancelled	
March 22	Beyond	Freeform	2017	Cancelled	
March 22	Portlandia	IFC	2011	Ended	
March 23	Relative Success with Tabatha	Bravo	2018	Cancelled	
March 28	The Path	Hulu	2016	Cancelled	
March 30	The Dangerous Book for Boys	Amazon Video	2018	Cancelled	
April 3	Fixer Upper	HGTV	2013	Ended	
April 3	The Quad	BET	2017	Cancelled	
April 3	The Mick	Fox	2017	Cancelled	
April 8	School of Rock	Nickelodeon	2016	Cancelled	
April 10	America's Next Top Model	VH1	2003	Cancelled	
April 11	Hap and Leonard	Sundance TV	2016	Cancelled	
April 15	Here and Now	HBO	2018	Cancelled	
April 16	Scorpion	CBS	2014	Cancelled	
April 19	Scandal	ABC	2012	Ended	
April 19	The Rundown with Robin Thede	BET	2017	Cancelled	
April 23	Peg + Cat	PBS Kids	2013	Cancelled	
April 29	Ash vs Evil Dead	Starz	2015	Cancelled	
April 30	Leave It to Stevie	VH1	2016	Cancelled	
May 1	LA to Vegas	Fox	2018	Cancelled	
May 6	The Last Man on Earth	Fox	2015	Cancelled	
May 7	Kevin Can Wait	CBS	2016	Cancelled	
May 13	The Arrangement	E!	2017	Cancelled	
May 13	The Royals	E!	2015	Cancelled	
May 14	Superior Donuts	CBS	2017	Cancelled	
May 15	Rise	NBC	2018	Cancelled	
May 15	New Girl	Fox	2011	Ended	
May 16	Alex, Inc.	ABC	2018	Cancelled	
May 18	Once Upon a Time	ABC	2011	Ended	
May 22	The Middle	ABC	2009	Ended	
May 22	Roseanne	ABC	1988	Cancelled	
May 23	Harry	Syndication	2016	Cancelled	
May 24	Showtime at the Apollo	Fox	1987	Cancelled	
May 25	The Thundermans (returned in 2025)	Nickelodeon	2013	Ended	
May 25	Trollhunters: Tales of Arcadia	Netflix	2016	Ended	
May 25	The Robert Irvine Show	The CW	2016	Cancelled	
May 25	Champions	NBC	2018	Cancelled	
May 27	Deception	ABC	2018	Cancelled	
May 29	The Chris Gethard Show	truTV	2011	Cancelled	
May 30	The Americans	FX	2013	Ended	
May 30	Famous in Love	Freeform	2017	Cancelled	
May 31	Nobodies	TV Land	2017	Cancelled	
June 3	Camp WWE	WWE Network	2016	Cancelled	
June 3	IndyCar Series on ABC	ABC	1965	Ended	
June 6	The Fosters	Freeform	2013	Ended	
June 7	Imposters	Bravo	2017	Cancelled	
June 8	Happening Now	Fox News	2007	Ended	
June 8	Sense8	Netflix	2015	Ended	
June 8	Crime Watch Daily	First-run syndication	2015	Cancelled	
June 9	Welcome to Sweetie Pie's	Oprah Winfrey Network	2011	Cancelled	
June 9	The Crossing	ABC	2018	Cancelled	
June 12	In Contempt	BET	2018	Cancelled	
June 14	The Adventures of Kid Danger	Nickelodeon	2018	Cancelled	
June 15	Life Sentence	The CW	2018	Cancelled	
June 22	Luke Cage	Netflix	2016	Cancelled	
June 24	Clarence	Cartoon Network	2014	Ended	
June 28	Desus & Mero	Viceland	2016	Ended	
June 28	The Chew	ABC	2011	Cancelled	
June 28	The Opposition with Jordan Klepper	Comedy Central	2017	Cancelled	
June 30	Taken	NBC	2017	Cancelled	
June 30	Hugh Hewitt	MSNBC	2017	Cancelled	
July 4	News with Ed Schultz	RT America	2016	Cancelled	
July 6	12 Monkeys	Syfy	2015	Ended	
July 8	I'm Dying Up Here	Showtime	2017	Cancelled	
July 12	Marlon	NBC	2017	Cancelled	
July 15	The Joel McHale Show with Joel McHale	Netflix	2018	Cancelled	
July 15	Running Wild with Bear Grylls (returned in 2019 and 2026)	NBC	2014	Cancelled	
July 16	Unreal	Hulu	2015	Cancelled	
July 17	Humans	AMC	2015	Cancelled	
July 18	Code Black	CBS	2015	Cancelled	
July 19	Girlfriends' Guide to Divorce	Bravo	2014	Ended	
July 21	Living Biblically	CBS	2018	Cancelled	
July 21	Me, Myself & I	CBS	2017	Cancelled	
July 22	Ghosted	Fox	2017	Cancelled	
July 23	Stuck in the Middle	Disney Channel	2016	Ended	
July 25	Young & Hungry	Freeform	2014	Ended	
July 25	Colony	USA Network	2016	Cancelled	
July 26	Nashville	CMT	2012	Ended	
July 26	The Jerry Springer Show	First-run syndication	1991	Cancelled	
July 29	The Break with Michelle Wolf	Netflix	2018	Cancelled	
July 30	Dietland	AMC	2018	Cancelled	
July 31	Casual	Hulu	2015	Ended	
August 1	The Originals	The CW	2013	Ended	
August 1	Six	History	2017	Cancelled	
August 2	The Four: Battle for Stardom	Fox	2018	Cancelled	
August 3	Quantico	ABC	2015	Cancelled	
August 4	Nicky, Ricky, Dicky & Dawn	Nickelodeon	2014	Cancelled	
August 5	Food Network Star	Food Network	2005	Cancelled	
August 6	Splash and Bubbles	PBS, PBS Kids	2016	Cancelled	
August 7	Face Off	Syfy	2011	Cancelled	
August 8	Reverie	NBC	2018	Cancelled	
August 10	All About the Washingtons	Netflix	2018	Cancelled	
August 16	Detroiters	Comedy Central	2017	Cancelled	
August 19	Shades of Blue	NBC	2016	Ended	
August 21	Love Is	OWN	2018	Cancelled	
August 23	American Woman	Paramount Network	2018	Cancelled	
August 23	Trial & Error	NBC	2017	Cancelled	
August 27	The Proposal	ABC	2018	Cancelled	
August 28	Hit the Floor	BET	2013	Cancelled	
August 29	Alone Together	Freeform	2018	Cancelled	
August 30	The Gong Show	ABC	1976	Cancelled	
September 2	Star Falls	Nickelodeon	2018	Cancelled	
September 3	Adventure Time (returned in 2026 as Adventure Time: Distant Lands)	Cartoon Network	2010	Ended	
September 7	Iron Fist	Netflix	2017	Cancelled	
September 8	Sofia the First	Disney Jr.	2013	Ended	
September 10	Mission Force One	Disney Jr.	2015	Ended	
September 13	Shooter	USA Network	2016	Cancelled	
September 13	Take Two	ABC	2018	Cancelled	
September 14	American Vandal	Netflix	2017	Cancelled	
September 14	NewsFix	KDAF-TV; KIAH; WSFL-TV	2011; 2015; 2016	Cancelled	
September 14	The First	Hulu	2018	Cancelled	
September 14	Forever	Amazon Video	2018	Cancelled	
September 15	Mysticons	Nicktoons	2017	Ended	
September 17	Salvation	CBS	2017	Cancelled	
September 18	Love Connection	Fox	2017	Cancelled	
September 18	Castaways	ABC	2018	Cancelled	
September 21	The Good Cop	Netflix	2018	Cancelled	
September 21	TKO: Total Knock Out	CBS	2018	Cancelled	
September 28	Outcast	Cinemax	2016	Cancelled	
October 1	Us & Them	Sony Crackle	2018	Cancelled	
October 2	Wrecked	TBS	2016	Cancelled	
October 5	Animals	HBO	2016	Cancelled	
October 7	The Venture Bros.	Adult Swim	2003	Cancelled	
October 15	Remy & Papoose: Meet the Mackies	VH1	2018	Cancelled	
October 19	Daredevil	Netflix	2015	Cancelled	
October 19	Lore	Amazon Video	2017	Cancelled	
October 21	Nina's World	Universal Kids	2015	Cancelled	
October 24	Megyn Kelly Today	NBC	2017	Cancelled	
October 26	Across America with Carol Costello	HLN	2017	Cancelled	
October 26	Crime & Justice with Ashleigh Banfield	HLN	2017	Cancelled	
October 26	Michaela	HLN	2016	Cancelled	
October 31	Channel Zero	Syfy	2016	Cancelled	
November 1	One Dollar	CBS All Access	2018	Cancelled	
November 2	House of Cards	Netflix	2013	Ended	
November 9	Patriot	Amazon Video	2017	Cancelled	
November 9	Wolf	CNN	2014	Ended	
November 11	The Last Ship	TNT	2014	Ended	
November 11	Anthony Bourdain: Parts Unknown	CNN	2013	Ended	
November 15	I Love You, America with Sarah Silverman	Hulu	2017	Cancelled	
November 20	Rainbow Brite	Hallmark Channel	2014	Cancelled	
November 20	Keep It Spotless	Nickelodeon	2014	Cancelled	
November 21	Stan Against Evil	IFC	2016	Cancelled	
November 22	Mystery Science Theater 3000	Netflix	1988	Cancelled	
November 22	Space Racers	Universal Kids	2014	Cancelled	
November 23	The Romanoffs	Amazon Video	2018		
December 8	HBO World Championship Boxing	HBO	1973	Ended	
December 8	Boxing After Dark	HBO	1996	Ended	
December 9	Dancing with the Stars: Juniors	ABC	2018	Cancelled	
December 13	Nightflyers	Syfy	2018	Cancelled	
December 14	Voltron: Legendary Defender	Netflix	2016	Ended	
December 14	Travelers	Netflix	2016	Cancelled	
December 14	Child Support	ABC	2018	Cancelled	
December 20	Murphy Brown	CBS	1988	Cancelled	
December 20	Timeless	NBC	2016	Ended	
December 27	I Feel Bad	NBC	2018	Cancelled	
December 28	Midnight, Texas	NBC	2017	Cancelled	
December 28	Z Nation	Syfy	2014	Cancelled	
December 30	Angie Tribeca	TBS	2016	Cancelled	
December 30	Your Business	MSNBC	2006	Ended	

=== Entering syndication in 2018 ===
A list of programs (current or canceled) that have accumulated enough episodes (between 65 and 100) or seasons (three or more) to be eligible for off-network syndication and/or basic cable runs.

Show	Seasons	In Production	Source
Black-ish	4	Yes	
Fresh Off the Boat	4	Yes	
Madam Secretary	4	Yes	
NCIS: New Orleans	4	Yes	
BoJack Horseman	5	Yes	
Chicago P.D.	5	Yes	
Wipeout	7	No	
