= List of programs broadcast by Universal Kids =

This is a list of television programs formerly broadcast by Universal Kids and its preschool brand Sprout in the United States.

== Former programming ==
=== Original programming ===
==== Animated ====
===== DreamWorks Animation Television =====
Title	Premiere date	End date	Source(s)
DreamWorks Dragons	September 10, 2017	January 28, 2024	
All Hail King Julien	September 10, 2017	August 22, 2022	
The Mr. Peabody & Sherman Show	April 15, 2018	January 25, 2023	
The Adventures of Puss in Boots	October 13, 2018	March 5, 2025	
Dinotrux	April 8, 2019	April 10, 2024	
Home: Adventures with Tip & Oh	April 27, 2019	March 27, 2024	
Where's Waldo?	July 20, 2019	December 25, 2024	(Note: Moved to Peacock to continue)
Trolls: The Beat Goes On!	November 16, 2020	March 5, 2025	

===== Universal Animation Studios =====
Title	Premiere date	End date	Source(s)
The Land Before Time	January 14, 2017	December 29, 2019	

==== Live-action ====
Title	Premiere date	End date	Source(s)
Top Chef Junior	October 13, 2017	December 1, 2018	
The Noise	October 23, 2017	April 23, 2020	
Beat the Clock	February 6, 2018	July 8, 2019	
Life Hacks for Kids: On the Road	March 3, 2018	September 30, 2018	
Junk Drawer Magical Adventures	May 12, 2018	January 20, 2020	
Get Out of My Room	June 16, 2018	August 30, 2024	
American Ninja Warrior Junior	October 13, 2018	June 12, 2020	
Team Ninja Warrior	January 12, 2019	2021	
Bajillionaires	April 10, 2020	2021	

==== Preschool ====
Title	Premiere date	End date	Note(s)
The Many Adventures of Mr. Mailman	July 3, 2006	July 3, 2010	
Pajanimals	November 3, 2008	May 20, 2018	(Note: Also aired on NBC Kids)
Noodle and Doodle	September 25, 2010	July 6, 2017	
The Chica Show	November 19, 2012	December 25, 2024	
Astroblast!	July 12, 2014	May 20, 2018	
Ruff-Ruff, Tweet and Dave	February 14, 2015	March 5, 2025	
Nina's World	September 26, 2015	December 25, 2024	
Floogals	January 23, 2016	March 5, 2025	
Terrific Trucks	July 9, 2016	December 25, 2024	
Noddy, Toyland Detective	September 3, 2016	2021	
Dot.	October 22, 2016	December 24, 2023	
The Ollie & Moon Show	May 27, 2017	2021	
Kody Kapow	July 15, 2017	May 19, 2024	
School of Roars	August 12, 2017	April 14, 2018	
Olivia	November 20, 2017	2021	
The Big Fun Crafty Show	May 19, 2018	December 3, 2023	
Get Up and Move	April 22, 2019	July 7, 2019	
Norman Picklestripes	July 27, 2019	April 22, 2024	
Powerbirds	January 19, 2020	January 3, 2025	(Note: Not produced in-house.)
Remy & Boo	May 1, 2020	January 2, 2025	
Superbuns	April 28, 2024	December 25, 2024	(Note: Originally on Peacock)
Dino Pops	June 1, 2024	December 7, 2024	
Li'l Stompers	June 1, 2024	December 28, 2024	
Tea Town Teddy Bears	November 16, 2024	December 21, 2024	
Press Start!	December 14, 2024		

=== Acquired programming ===
==== Animated ====
Title	Premiere date	End date	Note(s)
The Three Friends and Jerry	2005	2006	
Dennis & Gnasher	2005	2006	
The Jungle Bunch	March 19, 2016	2021	
The Deep	September 10, 2017	2021	
Inspector Gadget	November 20, 2017	2021	
Totally Spies!	June 24, 2019	2020	
Polly Pocket	July 1, 2019	2024	(Note: Moved to Netflix to continue)
Mighty Mike	September 2, 2019	May 15, 2022	

==== Live-action ====
Title	Premiere date	End date	Note(s)
Bounce	2007	2009	
Nowhere Boys	September 9, 2017	March 15, 2020	
The Next Step	September 9, 2017	August 16, 2019	
Little Big Shots	September 9, 2017	July 2018	
Officially Amazing	September 9, 2017	July 2018	
Hank Zipzer	September 9, 2017	December 27, 2019	
Little Lunch	September 9, 2017	2019	
Bear Grylls Survival School	September 9, 2017	July 8, 2019	
Mako Mermaids	November 18, 2017	November 8, 2019	
The Amazing Extraordinary Friends	January 1, 2018	2018	
Airmageddon	January 1, 2018	2018	
Big Star Little Star	February 10, 2018	2018	
Matilda and the Ramsay Bunch	February 10, 2018	June 17, 2018	
Mighty Mustangs	June 9, 2018	2018	
Driving Me Crazy	June 9, 2018	July 8, 2019	
Tricked	June 9, 2018	July 8, 2019	
Annedroids	August 11, 2018	September 1, 2018	
The Voice Kids	October 20, 2018	December 1, 2019	
Find Me in Paris	June 2, 2019	January 23, 2020	
Just Add Magic	June 9, 2019	November 22, 2019	
Holly Hobbie	December 5, 2019	January 23, 2020	

==== Preschool ====
Title	Premiere date	End date	Note(s)
Pingu	September 26, 2005	April 23, 2009	
Big Sister, Little Brother	September 26, 2005	August 18, 2009	
Kipper	September 26, 2005	July 26, 2015	
The Hoobs	December 25, 2006	February 13, 2009	
Fireman Sam	September 26, 2007	July 6, 2014	
Play with Me Sesame	September 26, 2007	2016	
Fifi and the Flowertots	January 14, 2008	February 13, 2012	
Panwapa	January 19, 2008	August 6, 2009	
Pic Me	May 5, 2008	May 5, 2011	
Dive, Olly, Dive!	June 7, 2008	August 10, 2014	
Frances	June 20, 2008	October 1, 2009	
Roary the Racing Car	September 26, 2008	July 7, 2012	
The Mighty Jungle	April 24, 2009	March 24, 2013	
Rubbadubbers	August 20, 2009	November 6, 2011	
The Wiggles	August 24, 2009	2021	
Dirtgirlworld	April 22, 2010	November 6, 2012	
Nina's Little Fables	June 28, 2010	December 9, 2013	
Chloe's Closet	July 12, 2010	May 20, 2018	
Monkey See, Monkey Do	August 24, 2010	August 18, 2013	
Driver Dan's Story Train	November 1, 2010	October 31, 2013	
What's Your News?	December 31, 2010	February 23, 2014	
LazyTown	September 5, 2011	September 26, 2016	
Poppy Cat	November 7, 2011	September 26, 2016	
Justin Time	April 22, 2012	June 19, 2015	
64 Zoo Lane	August 27, 2012	July 26, 2015	
Olive the Ostrich	August 27, 2012	July 26, 2015	
Wibbly Pig	August 27, 2012	July 26, 2015	
Tree Fu Tom	April 22, 2013	September 26, 2016	
Sarah & Duck	August 19, 2013	February 13, 2019	
Zou	September 2, 2013	May 20, 2018	
Stella and Sam	November 1, 2013	May 20, 2018	
Zerby Derby	March 1, 2014	May 20, 2018	
Lily's Driftwood Bay	May 12, 2014	May 20, 2018	
Earth to Luna!	August 16, 2014	September 26, 2016	
Boj	October 11, 2014	September 26, 2016	
Super Wings	March 14, 2015	2021	
Clangers	June 20, 2015	May 20, 2018	
Maya the Bee	September 26, 2015	June 1, 2018	
Sydney Sailboat	September 26, 2015	May 20, 2019	
YaYa and Zouk	February 20, 2016	May 20, 2019	
Little People	March 7, 2016	February 23, 2017	
The Doozers	May 28, 2016	2021	
The Furchester Hotel	September 26, 2016	March 2, 2019	
Topsy and Tim	June 17, 2017	May 19, 2020	
Ranger Rob	July 8, 2017	April 5, 2019	
Masha and the Bear	July 17, 2017	March 5, 2025	
Little Roy	November 20, 2017	December 28, 2019	
Ollie! The Boy Who Became What He Ate	November 20, 2017	June 3, 2018	
Charlie and Lola	December 9, 2017	December 9, 2018	
Pablo	April 2, 2018	August 28, 2018	
Dino Dan	October 6, 2018	2021	
Go Jetters	November 5, 2018	March 5, 2025	
Moon and Me	May 20, 2019	2021	
Cocomelon	June 21, 2021	March 5, 2025	

===== European co-productions =====
Title	Premiere date	End date	Note(s)
The Makery	May 24, 2024	May 27, 2024	

=== Programming from PBS Kids ===
Title	Premiere date	End date	Note(s)
Boohbah	September 26, 2005	December 19, 2009	
Jay Jay the Jet Plane	September 26, 2005	September 2, 2008	
Bob the Builder	September 26, 2005	July 7, 2019	
Barney & Friends	September 26, 2005	January 25, 2020	
Dragon Tales	September 26, 2005	August 31, 2010	
Thomas & Friends	September 26, 2005	July 26, 2015	
Make Way for Noddy	September 26, 2005	July 26, 2015	
Sesame Street	September 26, 2005	July 26, 2015	
The Berenstain Bears	September 26, 2005	September 9, 2017	
Teletubbies	September 26, 2005	September 5, 2009	
Angelina Ballerina	September 26, 2005	July 26, 2015	
Caillou	September 26, 2005	March 31, 2019	
Sagwa, the Chinese Siamese Cat	September 26, 2005	March 16, 2009	
Zoboomafoo	September 26, 2005	February 13, 2012	
Jakers! The Adventures of Piggley Winks	September 26, 2005	July 3, 2008	
Kratts' Creatures	2005	2006	
Franny's Feet	July 4, 2008	August 18, 2013	
Mama Mirabelle's Home Movies	January 26, 2009	October 24, 2012	
Super Why!	March 21, 2011	September 26, 2015	
Sid the Science Kid	March 25, 2013	October 3, 2014	
Space Racers	October 31, 2016	October 25, 2020	

=== Short-form programming ===
Title	Premiere date	End date	Source(s)
Sing It, Laurie!	March 25, 2013	March 25, 2016	
Snug's House	August 19, 2017	2020	
NBC News for Universal Kids	September 29, 2018	April 6, 2019	
Mofy	May 20, 2019	2020	
Masha and the Bear: Nursery Rhymes	January 2, 2021	March 4, 2025	
Babble Bop!	August 29, 2022	December 29, 2023	
Masha and the Bear Shorties	November 3, 2023	March 4, 2025	
Masha's Karaoke and Songs	November 9, 2023	March 5, 2025	

=== Blocks ===
The programming blocks below were all shown under the Sprout banner.

Title	Premiere date	End date	Note(s)
The Birthday Show	September 26, 2005	May 12, 2009	
The Good Night Show	September 26, 2005	March 31, 2017	
Sprout Diner	September 18, 2006	September 20, 2008	
Sprout Sharing Show	May 5, 2008	May 11, 2014	
The Let's Go Show	June 25, 2007	September 24, 2010	
Musical Mornings with Coo	September 26, 2007	August 21, 2009	
The Sunny Side Up Show	September 26, 2007	August 11, 2017	
Wiggly Waffle	August 24, 2009	March 22, 2013	
The Super Sproutlet Show	February 14, 2012	June 19, 2015	
Family Movie Night	September 26, 2015	September 8, 2017	
