= Nina's World =

2015 Canadian-American TV series or program

- Genre: Preschool; Educational; Children's television series Adventure; Fantasy; Musical
- Created by: Andrew Beecham; Lisa O'Brien
- Based on: The Good Night Show
- Directed by: Kevin Micallef
- Voices of: Rita Moreno; Isabella Farrier; Michele Lepe; Bronwen Holmes; Mandy Patinkin
- Theme music composer: Daniel Ingram
- Composers: Caleb Chan; Daniel Ingram
- Countries of origin: Canada; United States
- Original languages: English; Spanish
- No. of seasons: 2
- No. of episodes: 54 episodes, 4 specials and 13 shorts

Production
- Executive producers: Michele Lepe; Lisa O'Brien
- Editor: Jonas Crawley
- Running time: 21 minutes
- Production company: Pipeline Studios

Original release
- Network: Universal Kids (Note: Known as Sprout until September 9, 2017)
- Release: September 26, 2015 – October 21, 2018

Nina's World is an animated children's television series. It is a spin-off/prequel to the Sprout network's first programming block, The Good Night Show, focusing on host Nina, as a 6-year-old child who lives with her family in Chicago, Illinois. It's the second Sprout original series to be spun off from one of the network's programming blocks (the first being The Chica Show, which was spun off from The Sunny Side Up Show). The show premiered on September 26, 2015 on the Sprout network. This incarnation of Nina was introduced by Cat Greenleaf in August 2015.

== Plot ==
This show follows 6-year old Nina, who lives in the city of Chicago, as each adventure takes her on new things to try. At the end, she goes to bed while remembering the adventure.

== Voice cast ==
- Isabella Farrier as Nina
- Rita Moreno as Abuelita
- Michele Lepe as Mami
- David Torres as Papi
- Adriana Caldwell as Santi
- Ulka Mohanty as Dr. Kapur
- Evans Johnson as Mavis the Post Master
- Dhirendra Miyanger as Mr. Kapur
- Mandy Patinkin as Mr. Lambert
- Douglas Quan as Mr. Lin
- Darcy Han as Mrs. Lin
- Dayton Wall as Aiden
- Enrique Lopez as Carlos
- Bronwen Holmes as Chelsea B.
- Ethan Luu as Eddie Lin
- Cristiano Batista as Nico
- Gigi Saul Guerrero as Rosie
- Tiana Jung as Skye Lin
- Kira Tozer as Suzy
- Edwin Perez as Tio Javier
- Tabitha St. Germain as Claire, Mrs. Goldstein and Star
- Michael Daingerfield as Radio DJ
- Caitlyn Bairstow as Rhea the Raptor

== Characters ==
=== Kids ===
- Nina Sabrina Flores (also called Ninala) is the titular protagonist, voiced by Isabella Farrier. She is six years old, celebrates birthdays with Star, and feeds her pet at night. She has the same name as an adult who appears in The Good Night Show. she would often visualize her daydreams and wishes, On the other hand she is playing with her best plush/imaginary friend Star, her friends, and her family. Starting in the second season, Nina would often break the fourth wall by talking to the audience from the beginning of episodes when she's doing something cool, telling about the situation, and by the end of the episode about a lesson she learns or plan succeed. Her middle name is mentioned by her mother in "Nina Rides a Bike".
- Aiden Jakeups is one of Nina's friends who at first started out as a bully in the episode "Nina's Amazing Amigos" but then became a friend onwards, although he would sometimes tease Nina and her friends. He loves eating Colombian arepas. He also has a allergy to Nuts in the episode "Nina's Nutty Adventure", but is only able to eat things that are nut free. He is voiced by Dayton Wall-Fouts.
- Carlos is Nina's best human male friend and Nico's younger brother. He is an African American and a Latino from Colombia. His catchphrases are "Aw, bananas" and "Why, (something), why?!" He often likes playing with Nina and Chelsea. He is voiced by Enrique Lopez in Season 1 and Chance Hurstfield in Season 2.
- Chelsea B Smith is Nina's best female friend, voiced by Bronwen Holmes in Season 1 and Zoey Siewert in Season 2. She has a fun-loving attitude and shows an obsession for space. She can also roller skate and jump rope. She is the daughter of Claire and Oliver. Her catchphrases are "Jumping Jupiter", "Bingo Bango", and "Brain Blast".
- Eddie Lin is the Skye’s brother and a close friend of Nina, Eddie works at "The Everything Store" with his sister Skye and his parents. He's good at doing karate, and he can be a bit bossy when he thinks everyone should go his way because he's the oldest. Voiced by Sean Quan.
- Nico is Carlos' big deaf Brazilian brother. He knows how to speak in sign language, though he doesn't usually reveal his voice in some episodes, until in the episode, "Nina's Brother", he was able to actually speak, with his voice being provided by Cristiano Batista.
- Rosie, also called Rostia, is voiced by Gigi Saul Guerrero (appears in "Nina Dives In"). She serves as a lifeguard in the community pool, and as a Karate Teacher in "Nina Learns Karate".
- Skye Lin is an older friend of Nina who designs kites, and sometimes helps at “The Everything Store” with her brother Eddie and her parents. She is voiced by Tiana Jung.
- Suzy is voiced by Kira Tozer. She appears in "Nina the Babysitter".
- Jennifer is Mrs. Goldstein's daughter who only appeared in "Nina's World Hanukkah Adventure Special". Voiced by Mayim Bialik.
- Santi Flores, formally called Santiago, is Nina's little brother voiced by Adriana Cadwell. His appearance was in "Nina's Sweet Valentine Surprise" as a baby, then in the second season, he became a toddler who always wants to play and help out on what her sister is doing. However, sometimes he can't due to him being too young. He loves bears and soccer. Santi copies Nina for fun, but they still love each other.
- Natalia is Nina's cousin from Mexico, voiced by Ana Martin, who has appeared in the second season "The New Nina", and again in "Nina and her Shadow". She always likes telling jokes, especially with Carlos.
- Polly is Mavis' niece, who is very shy and is Santi's best friend, voiced by Ava Kelders. She appears in an episode "Nina's Yard Dale". Other episodes where she has appeared in the third season are "Nina Finds a Kitten", "Nina's in Charge", and "Nina in The Middle".
- Hemeed is one of Nina's friends. He's usually silent but has talked in a few other episodes. He appeared in the second season. Voiced by Karim Fahmy.

=== Adults ===
- Abuelita Yolie is Nina’s grandmother(abuelita is a Spanish term of endearment for abuela which means grandmother) and Mami's mother who teaches Nina and others stretches each episode, voiced by Rita Moreno. She is considered one of the main characters. Yolie moved from Mexico to a new home with her daughter (Nina's Mami) prior to Nina's birth.
- Carmen is Nina's cousin.
- Claire (also spelled Clair in closed captions) is Chelsea’s mother, voiced by Tabitha St. Germain She is a local dentist being referred as Dr Claire.
- Dr. Kapur is the local Veterinarian at the Pet Vet and is the husband of Mr Kapur. Voiced by Ulka Mohanty.
- Jorge is Carmen's fiancé.
- Mami aka Mrs. Flores is voiced by Michele Lepe and the husband of Papi/Mr Flores, who works at the Bakery, who plays the adult Nina in The Good Night Show. Nina is Mami's daughter. Like her mother Yolie, she is a Mexican immigrant.
- Mavis the Post Master and the niece of Polly who is voiced by Evans Johnson.
- Mr. Kapur is the principal at Nina's school and the wife of Dr Kapur. Voiced by Dhirendra Miyanger.
- Mr. Lambert the town librarian and a secret admirer to Abuelita Yolie. Voiced by Mandy Patinkin.
- Mr. Lin is voiced by Douglas Quan.
- Mrs. Lin is voiced by Darcy Han.
- Mrs. Goldstein is a cowardly but nice shopkeeper lady running in the local grocery store. Voiced by Tabitha St. Germain.
- Papi aka Mr. Flores is Nina's father and the wife of Mami/Mrs Flores, voiced by David Torres.
- Tio Javier is Nina's uncle and Mrs Flores's brother and a musician that runs in a music store. Voiced by Edwin Perez.
- Dr Rivers is part of the Ocean Patrol and has appeared in the episode "Nina's Seaside Rescue".
- Paquito Fernando is a famed salsa singer and is friend of Abuelita Yolie and Tio Javier who appears in Nina Live. Voiced by Lin-Manuel Miranda.

=== Animals ===
- Hush is the pet fish of Nina in every episode before Nina goes to bed she would feed Hush and say "Hush Hush little fish we are here to make a wish we close our eyes and then we start to make a wish with all our heart" However starring in Season 2 the bedtime scene is now unsence [sic?] with Nina now counting with her adventure, Hush later guest-hosts The Good Night Show with Melanie Martinez and Star before Leo replaced Melanie and then Nina replaced Leo.
- Lucy is a firefly who provides light at Nina's bedside In the Season 2 episode The Hand Me Down she now gives Lucy to her little brother Santi since he decide that Lucy his new favorite toy and Nina is too old to play her, Lucy later guest-hosts The Good Night Show with Leo before Nina replaces him.
- Max is Carlos and Nico's mischievous, but friendly, dog whose barks are provided by Frank Welker.

=== Sidekicks ===
- Star is the best friend of Nina who is a Star as his name suggests, voiced by Tabitha St. Germain. He can only be seen talking to Nina when she's alone but starting in the second season he now interact with Carlos & Chelsea and Santi occasionally. He appears 2D in this show and later appears as a 3D puppet in The Good Night Show. which he originally hosts with Melanie Martinez then Leo before Nina came to replace them.

== Episodes ==
=== Season 1 (2015–16) ===
1 Nina's Birthday; Nina's Big Adventure (September 26, 2015)

2 Nina the Nurse; Super Nina (September 26, 2015)

3 Nina Flies a Kite; Nina's First Sleepover (September 27, 2015)

4 Nina Wants to Grow; Nina Takes the Stage (September 27, 2015)

5 Nina from Space; Nina Makes Music (October 3, 2015)

6 Nina Unplugged; Nina the Great (October 10, 2015)

7 Nina the Artist; Nina and the Missing Myna Bird (October 17, 2015)

8 Nina Delivers; Nina's Library Hop (October 24, 2015)

9 Nina and Papi Play Baseball; Nina the Shadow Chaser (October 31, 2015)

10 Nina's Henna Hijinx; Nina's Everything Garden (November 7, 2015)

11 Nina's Family Museum; Nina Dives In (November 14, 2015)

12 Nina's Show and Tell; Nina's Snow Day (November 21, 2015)

13 Nina Rides a Bike; Nina Takes the Cake (April 4, 2016)

14 Nina Dog Sits; Nina Gets on Track (April 7, 2016)

15 Nina Dances with Nico; Nina Bakes Bread; (April 11, 2016)

16 Nina's Special Dress; Nina Hunts for Treasure (April 14, 2016)

17 Nina Cleans Her Room; Nina's Brother for the Day (April 18, 2016)

18 Nina the Detective; Nina's Old Oak Tree (April 21, 2016)

19 Nina Gets Packing; Nina Camps Out (April 25, 2016)

20 Camp Nina; Nina's Kickoff (April 28, 2016)

21 Nina's Game Day; Nina Learns Karate (May 2, 2016)

22 To Mami Love Nina; Nina's Lemonade Stand (May 6, 2016)

23 Nina Color Festival; Nina's Amazing Amigos (May 28, 2016)

24 Nina and the Yard Sale; Nina and Papi Best Day Ever (June 18, 2016)

25 Nina's Very Merry Gift; Nina Celebrates Chinese New Year (November 24, 2016)

26 Nina the Babysitter; Nina's Thanksgiving (November 24, 2016)

=== Season 2 (2017–18) ===
1 Chelsea's Space Adventure; The Thanksgiving Sharing Box (November 18, 2017)

2 Nina's Baker Boogie; Letter to Santa (December 17, 2017)

3 Santi Cranky Time; Max Gets Stinky (March 2, 2018)

4 The Mysterious Food Truck; The Lost Alpaca (March 3, 2018)

5 The Bear Trackers; Number One Soccer Fan (March 6, 2018)

6 The Hand Me Down; The Sneaky Spider (March 7, 2018)

7 Sky High Mystery; Nina and Santi Celebrate Ranki (March 8, 2018)

8 Star Goes Missing; Carlos Finds His Voice (March 9, 2018)

9 Nina's Superhero Day; The Best Thank You Gift (March 10, 2018)

10 Nina's New Amigo; The Viva Lucha Libre Show (March 11, 2018)

11 Nina and the Dentist; Nina's Nutty Adventure (March 20, 2018)

12 Nina's Marionette Show; The New Nina (April 30, 2018)

13 Nina Misses Mami and Papi; Chelsea's Slam Dunk (May 1, 2018)

14 Chelsea's Family Day; Nina and Abuela Special Day (May 2, 2018)

15 Nina Finds a Kitten; Nina's Big Race (June 4, 2018)

16 The Great Pita Fajita; Happy Anniversary Mami and Papi (June 4, 2018)

17 Max Wants to Play; The New Clubhouse (July 2, 2018)

18 Nina's Seaside Rescue (July 3, 2018)

19 Nina Live; Nina in Charge (July 4, 2018)

20 Carlos' Winning Shirt; The Best Ending Ever (July 23, 2018)

21 Nina the Nature Guide; Nina's Bad Hair Day (August 20, 2018)

22 Chelsea's History Mystery; Nina and Her Shadow (August 20, 2018)

23 Carlos' Rocks Ballet; Nina in the Middle (September 1, 2018)

24 Nina's Top Secret Party; Don Pablo Goes to the Game (October 15, 2018)

25 The Star Amigos' Art Show; Wish You Were Here (October 16, 2018)

26 Do Everything Day!; The Dragon Boat Race (October 21, 2018)

=== Shorts ===
In addition to the main full episodes there are a number of titled shorts associated with them:

- Nina's Birthday Party
- Nina's Imagination
- Nina's World EPK
- Nina and Papi's Best Day Ever
- Nina and the Yard Sale
- Nina Cupcake
- Nina Dog Sits aka Nina Dogs Sits is a short based on episode 14
- Nina Good Night
- Nina Shops with Abuelita
- Nina Speaks Spanish
- Nina with Something Completely Silly
- Stretches with Abuelita
- Tio Missing Party

== Broadcast ==
The show premiered as part of NBC Kids on January 2, 2016, with new episodes airing weekly through February, scheduled for 10:00am on Saturday mornings.

On July 2, 2016, the show began airing on Telemundo's morning block MiTelemundo with two new episodes every Saturday morning at 9:30am–10:30am with Spanish audio track.

Internationally, the series can also be found on eToonz in South Africa.

== Reception ==
The series was positively received. Emily Ashby of Common Sense Media called the series "superb" and said that the series has "strong diversity, community, [and] family themes". She also argued that the series has themes of forging "strong relationships," solving issues, and embracing new situations, and stated the show's best aspect is its protagonist, who would "delight youngsters who tune in for her adventures."

== Games ==
- Nina's Big Adventure
- Nina Match Up
- Spot the Differences in Nina's World
