= The Good Night Show =

American television programming block

- Network: PBS Kids Sprout (now Universal Kids)
- Launched: September 26, 2005; 21 years ago
- Closed: 2016
- Country of origin: United States
- Owner: PBS (seasons 1-5); NBCUniversal (seasons 6-7)
- Format: Preschool education series
- Running time: 3 hours
- Original language: English

The Good Night Show is a defunct American television programming block for preschoolers that aired on the Sprout channel (previously known as PBS Kids Sprout). It was designed to help preschoolers get ready for bedtime. The block featured recurring themes based on preschoolers' nightly routines, such as dreams, brushing teeth, and cleaning up before bed.

One of Sprout's designers, Ward Jenkins, stated that "Sprout is PBS Kids' answer to Noggin." Prior to New Year's Eve 2007, Noggin did not offer preschool shows in the nighttime hours. So at the time, The Good Night Show allowed Sprout to capitalize on nighttime programming for preschoolers, setting itself apart from its competitor Noggin. The block aired daily from 6:00 pm to 3:00 am ET. It appeared on Sprout from the channel's launch on September 26, 2005, until 2016.

Unlike the channel's other blocks, The Good Night Show was repeated twice over the course of each night. Throughout the block, viewers (referred to as "Sproutlets") were encouraged to participate in host-led games, songs, crafts, and lessons in yoga and sign language. Activities generally revolved around a theme, and took place between animated episodes that related to this theme. These themes included issues of interest to preschool-aged children and their parents, such as imaginary friends, teddy bears, shadows, opposites, or babysitters.

== Format ==
=== Segments ===
The Good Night Show featured a variety of segments. The block usually opened with Nina introducing herself and Star, as well as the theme of the night.

- "Sprout-o-Scope" - This segment involved constellations. Nina and Star looked at the night sky with their telescope, called the "Sprout-o-Scope." Occasionally, this segment included viewer-submitted birthdays left over from The Sunny Side Up Show.
- "Lucy, Light the Way" - This segment featured an animated game. Lucy, a firefly puppet who introduced the shows that came between the block, lit up different areas as viewers guessed where she was.
- "Crafts" - This segment involved a different craft or art project based on the night's theme. The crafts were removed in 2012 and replaced by a new segment called "Sprout a Sandy Story," where Nina would tell a story and draw pictures in sand.
- "Moonbeam Wheel" - This segment involved Nina and Star spinning their Moonbeam Wheel and translating a word in Spanish.
- "Clean Up" - This segment involved cleaning up before bed. Nina and Star sang a musical number called "Clean Up" while cleaning.
- "Ready for Bed" (Brusha Brusha) - This segment involved brushing teeth and washing faces. During this segment, Star would go to sleep. Before the segment, a commercial for Aquafresh toothpaste would be shown. The commercial would continue to play until 6:00 am.
- "Hush, Hush, Little Fish" - The final segment involved Nina encouraging viewers to give their wishes to Hush, a goldfish. After this segment, one of two clips was played: Sprout characters sleeping to the Pajanimals song "La-La-Lullaby," or a repeated Aquafresh commercial. The Pajanimals song was removed in 2016, and the Aquafresh commercial was removed in November 2013. In the newer version (2014-2017) before the Hush the fish segment, Star is unwilling to go to bed and says, "I'm not ready to go to sleep yet." Nina convinces him to "dream about the wonderful adventures that one can have tomorrow." In the end, Star (obedient about "getting some rest") is able to say goodnight and goes to sleep. The "Hush the Fish" segment plays after Nina folds Star into bed, and Nina sings the Good Night Song before falling asleep.

From 2007 to 2015, an annual event called "Sprout's Snooze-A-Thon" (formerly the "Good Night of Sweet Dreams") was aired from 6:00 pm on Christmas Eve to 6:00 am on Christmas morning. Following an introduction from Nina, the event showed many characters from Sprout's shows and blocks falling asleep. The event was likened to the Yule log and was intended to help preschoolers fall asleep on Christmas Eve.

=== Settings ===
- The You and Me Tree was the block's setting from 2011 to 2017. It was a treehouse made from recycled objects and craft materials.
- The Goodnight Garden was the block's previous setting from 2005 to 2011. It was a garden of trees with star-shaped leaves, and it had patterned blankets on the ground.

== Characters ==
=== Final hosts ===
For most of the block's run, it was hosted by Nina alongside Star, Lucy, and Hush. Nina's uncle, Tio Javier, was introduced in the final season as a recurring co-host.

- Nina (played by Michele Lepe) was the longest-running host of the block. She was known as "The Goodnight Guide" and owned the You and Me Tree. She was of Hispanic heritage and often taught Spanish phrases to Star and the viewers. She liked to tell stories and fables, which were sometimes shown on-screen through animations and sand artwork. Nina guest-hosted one of Sprout's other blocks, The Sunny Side Up Show, in 2009 and 2011. She appears as an animated character in the spin-off Nina's World.
- Star (voiced by Stacia Newcomb) was a yellow star-shaped puppet who served as the co-host and the child character. He often asked questions about the evening's theme, commented to Nina about the segments, and encouraged viewers to follow him as he acted out bedtime routines such as brushing his teeth or reading a bedtime story. On some occasions, Star did not want to go to sleep at bedtime and needed some coaxing from Nina.
- Lucy was a blue-and-purple firefly. In Leo and Nina's episodes, Lucy introduced the shows that came between the block. She was also featured in games, such as "Lucy Light the Way"; in the game, viewers were shown parts of a picture and then guessed what the picture represented. She was originally depicted as a glowing finger puppet, but she later became a CGI character.
- Hush was Melanie's pet, a live-action goldfish who lived in a bowl decorated with star-shaped ornaments. In Melanie's episodes, he was a main character and blew bubbles to announce the shows that came between the block. In Leo and Nina's episodes, Hush's role was reduced, and he only appeared at the end of each show.
- Tio Javier (played by Esai Morales) was Nina's uncle. He was a musician who liked to play the guitar and write his own songs. He debuted as a recurring character in 2015 and co-hosted multiple episodes of the final season. He returned in Nina's World as an animated character, voiced by Edwin Perez.

=== Past hosts ===
- Melanie (played by Melanie Martinez, unrelated to the music artist) was an energetic and artistic babysitter who lived with her pet goldfish, Hush. She liked to talk with Hush and draw pictures of him. She was very outgoing and often sang upbeat dance songs, such as "The Craft Song". She hosted the first two seasons from 2005 to 2006. She also appeared in a winter-themed block called The Let's Snow Show in December 2005 along with The Birthday Show host Kevin Yamada.
- Leo (played by Noel MacNeal) was a calm and level-headed gardener who looked after the Goodnight Garden. He often taught the viewers about different flowers and how to plant seeds or fruit pits. He also took care of a firefly named Lucy, who liked to sleep in a pocket on Leo's vest. When Lucy started to glow, Leo took her out of his pocket and let her fly around the garden. Leo hosted 24 episodes in 2006 and continued to appear as a recurring character in the third season alongside Nina. Leo's actor, Noel MacNeal, was selected for his puppeteering roles on Bear in the Big Blue House as the titular character of the same name and as Kako on Oobi.
- The Helping Hand was a silent human hand who appeared during the "Goodnight Tale" segments, holding up finger puppets and paper cut-outs.

== History ==
The block received criticism from the Campaign for a Commercial-Free Childhood, which likened the block to "a TV version of a sleeping pill for toddlers." It criticized Sprout for "implying that its programming will ease children into sleep when research suggests that screen time before bed undermines healthy sleep habits." Susan Linn, a Harvard University psychologist, urged Sprout to cancel The Good Night Show for keeping children awake rather than helping them go to sleep. The president of Sprout, Sandy Wax, denied that the block was misleading, stating that "The Good Night Show is not a sleep aid for children ... it's a tool for parents to help them establish a bedtime routine for their preschooler."

According to Kidscreen, Sprout aimed "to follow a day in the life of a child and thus created a [block] called The Good Night Show in 2005." The block was scripted and filmed in Philadelphia. The first season premiered on September 26, 2005. The second season was filmed from April to May 2006 and premiered in July 2006.

While the second season was airing, Melanie Martinez alerted Sprout that she had appeared in two parody commercials from the Technical Virgin website six years earlier; she was fired and replaced by Noel MacNeal from September 11 to December 2006. Noel MacNeal hosted a season of 24 episodes, which were packaged with the title A Very Special Good Night Show. In December 2006, the third season premiered, with Michele Lepe as the permanent host.

== Episodes ==
- Sharing
- Sports & Games
- Homes
- Letters
- Jobs
- Growing
- Moon
- Family
- Babies
- Friendship
- Colors
- Reading & Storytelling
- Shapes
- Numbers
- Hats
- Safety
- Imagination & Make-Believe
- Travel
- Around the World
- Animals
- Feelings
- Art
- Nature
- Sports
- Pets
- Opposites
- Weather

- English

== Programming ==
- The Berenstain Bears
- Dragon Tales (2005–2010)
- Thomas & Friends (2005–2015)
- Zou
- Poppy Cat (2011–2016)
- Rubbadubbers (2009–2011)
- Kipper (2005–2015)
- Angelina Ballerina (2005–2015)
- Sagwa, the Chinese Siamese Cat (2005–2009)
- Caillou
- Big Sister, Little Brother (2005–2009)
- James the Cat
- Pingu (2005–2009)
- Nina's Little Fables (2010–2013)
- Driver Dan's Story Train (2010–2013)
- Jim Henson's Pajanimals (2008–2017)
- Angelina Ballerina: The Next Steps (2011–2015)
- Wibbly Pig (2012–2015)
- 64 Zoo Lane (2012–2013)
- Olive the Ostrich
- Sarah & Duck
- Clangers
- Stella and Sam
- Lily's Driftwood Bay
- Astroblast!
- Ruff-Ruff, Tweet and Dave
- Nina's World
- Maya the Bee
- Floogals
- Make Way for Noddy
- Bob the Builder
