= Sprout Sharing Show =

The Sprout Sharing Show
- Country: United States
- Broadcast area: Nationwide
- Network: Sprout (3:00 pm–6:00 pm)

Programming
- Language: English
- Picture format: 480i; 1080i

Ownership
- Owner: PBS; HIT Entertainment; NBCUniversal Television Distribution

History
- Launched: May 5, 2008; 17 years ago
- Closed: May 11, 2014; 11 years ago (Sprout)

The Sprout Sharing Show was a programming block on the Sprout cable channel. The show premiered on May 5, 2008, airing on daily afternoons (3 PM-6 PM EST) in the lineup formerly occupied by The Let's Go Show. However, The Let's Go Show moved to a weekend lineup (6 AM-7:30 AM and 9 AM-11 AM EST) until September 2010. It features three new programs which encourage viewers (referred to on the channel as "Sproutlets") to send in photos, videos, artwork, and stories. Programs and segments are introduced by the show's puppet hosts: Patty (a pig voiced by Kelly Vrooman), Ricky (a rabbit voiced by Kevin Yamada), and Curtis E. Owl (voiced by Brendan Gawell), whose first name and middle initial are a pun on the word "courtesy". Other characters include Patty's mother, Ricky's father and Curtis' younger brother, Otis, who plays the ukulele. It ended on May 11, 2014.

== Characters ==
- Patty (voiced by Kelly Vrooman)
- Ricky (voiced by Kevin Yamada)
- Reginald (voiced by Forrest Harding)
- Curtis E. Owl (voiced by Brendon Gawel)
- Sharon (voiced by Forrest Harding)
- Otis (voiced by Forrest Harding)
- Stage Mice

== Original programming ==
In Pic Me, a co-production with Nickelodeon UK, head-shot photos of children are superimposed on animated bodies, and these new hybrid animations are used as main characters in animated stories. Other segments include viewer-submitted videos, and a feature where drawings sent in by viewers are animated and made into stories themselves.

== Acquired programming ==
The other short segments are:

- Angelina Ballerina
- Bob the Builder
- The Chica Show
- Chloe's Closet
- Dirtgirlworld
- Dragon Tales
- Fifi and the Flowertots
- Franny's Feet
- The Hoobs
- Make Way for Noddy
- Mama Mirabelle's Home Movies
- The Mighty Jungle
- Monkey See Monkey Do
- Olive the Ostrich
- Pic Me
- Pingu
- Super Why!
- Thomas & Friends
- The Wiggles
- Zoboomafoo
