= Rogelio Martinez (playwright) =

American playwright

- Born: Sancti Spíritus, Cuba
- Education: Syracuse University (BA Television, Radio and Film; BA English and Textual Studies) Columbia University (MFA Playwriting)
- Occupation: Playwright
- Writing career
- Notable works: When Tang Met Laika; Ping Pong; Born in East Berlin; Blind Date; Elian
- Notable awards: Guggenheim Fellowship
- Website: rogeliomartinez.net

Rogelio Martinez is an American playwright, screenwriter, translator, actor, theater educator, and arts advocate, best known for his Cold War trilogy of plays. He received a Guggenheim Fellowship in 2017 and is the recipient of numerous awards and honors. His plays have been workshopped, produced, and commissioned in theaters across the United States and worldwide.

Martinez was born in Sancti Spíritus, Cuba, and came to the United States on the Mariel boatlift in 1980.

== Career ==
Martinez is an alumnus of New Dramatists and the Dorothy Strelsin New American Writer's Group at Primary Stages. He was a Remembrance Scholar at Syracuse University in 1992-93. Martinez was selected as the first ever Mid-Career Fellow at the Lark Theater Company.

Martinez, who describes himself as a “child of the Cold War,” has made a study of that era. He wrote When Tang Met Laika, about space exploration in the post-Cold War period, after being awarded an Alfred P. Sloan Foundation New Science and Technology Initiative Grant by the Denver Center Theatre Company, which later produced the play.

He followed that up with a three-play cycle about the Cold War itself.

Ping Pong, the trilogy’s first play, examines U.S.-Chinese relations during the early 1970s. Presented at New York City’s Public Theater, it was later published by Broadway Play Publishing.

Born in East Berlin, the cycle’s second play, is set in East Germany prior to the fall of the Berlin Wall and looks at the cultural impact of a Bruce Springsteen concert there. The play, which was workshopped at the Atlantic Theater Company in New York, had its world premiere at the San Francisco Playhouse and was performed in both English and German at Berlin’s Stasi Museum. It was also translated into Hungarian and Romanian.

Blind Date, the trilogy’s final play, reenacts the first meeting of U.S. President Ronald Reagan and Soviet General Secretary Mikhail Gorbachev at the 1985 Geneva Summit. Originally commissioned by the Denver Center Theatre Company, the play was featured at the Colorado New Play Summit in 2017. The play was produced at Chicago's Goodman Theatre, where it was directed by Tony Award nominee Robert Falls and starred Tony Award-winning actress Deanna Dunagan, who received a Joseph Jefferson Award nomination for her performance.

During the COVID-19 pandemic, Martinez worked on The Seven Deadly Sins, a project created and directed by Miami New Drama Artistic Director Michel Hausmann, which won the Drama League Award for Outstanding Interactive or Socially Distanced Theater. It was the largest theater production permitted by the Actors’ Equity Association during the pandemic.

Martinez was commissioned by Miami New Drama to write the play Elian, about Elian Gonzalez, who at age six was the subject of an international immigration controversy.

Martinez wrote the play The National Pastime, which tackles the Houston Astros cheating scandal, as a commission for Syracuse Stage.

Miami New Drama also commissioned him to write a play about the making of the 1983 film Scarface for its 2024-2025 season.

Other theaters where Martinez’s work has been commissioned, workshopped, or produced include The Public and TheaterWorks in New York City; the Mark Taper Forum in Los Angeles, the Arden Theater in Philadelphia; the Asolo Repertory Theatre in Sarasota, Florida; the South Coast Repertory in Costa Mesa, California; the Ojai Theater Company in Ojai, California; and the Oregon Shakespeare Festival.

As of 2023, he was working on the TV series Billion Dollar Whale, about the 1MDB money laundering scandal, based on the nonfiction book by Wall Street Journal reporters Tom Wright and Bradley Hope.

Other television credits include working as a screenwriter on a project involving producer Tom Fontana’s adaptation of Nicholas Griffin’s nonfiction book The Year of Dangerous Days: Riots, Refugees, and Cocaine in Miami 1980. Martinez has also worked as a screenwriter for children’s programming on Nickelodeon.

As an actor, Martinez appeared in the 1999 film Exiles in New York, which played at AFI Fest, South by Southwest, the Santa Barbara Film Festival, and the Latin American International Film Festival in Havana, Cuba.

Martinez has worked as a translator on the plays of Cuban and Mexican playwrights.

He has advocated for the arts before the New York State Legislature in Albany.

Martinez has taught playwriting at both undergraduate and graduate schools including City College of New York, Montclair State University, Rutgers University, and Goddard College. He has also worked with high school students, and in 2016 he taught a two-week writing workshop in Portugal. As of 2023 he was a playwriting instructor at Columbia University and New York University.

== Works ==
=== Plays ===
- Adrift, 1996
- Comrades and Worms, 1996
- Illuminating Veronica, 1999
- I Regret She's Made of Sugar
- Fizz: The Totally Fictionalized Story of America's Greatest Blunder
- Lost in Translation'', 2002
- My First Radical, 2005
- Learning Curve, 2005
- Lake Effect Snow, 2006
- Union City, New Jersey, Where Are You?
- Lenin's Omelet: Two Plays
- Elk Cloner, 2008
- All Eyes and Ears, 2008
- Arrivals and Departures, 2009
- When Tang Met Laika, 2010
- Cocktail Time in Cuba, 2010
- Wanamkaer's Pursuit, 2011
- Bicycle Girl, 2011
- Symbiotic Love, 2012
- The Seven Deadly Sins, Miami New Drama, 2020
- Comes as You Are, Miami New Drama, 2020
- Downtown Stories, Dreams from New York's Oldest Streets, 2021
- Elian, Miami New Drama, 2022
- The National Pastime, Syracuse Stage

==== Cold War trilogy ====
- Ping Pong, 2015
- Born in East Berlin, 2020
- Blind Date, 2018

=== Film and television ===
- Untitled, Got Cay Productions, 2002 (unproduced)
- Americanos, MTV Films, 2009 (unproduced)
- Yoani, Open View Productions, 2015 (unproduced)
- Astroblast!, Sprout Children's Television, 2014
- Zoo Wahoo, Netflix, 2019
- Captain Calavera, Nickelodeon Television, 2020
- Edge of Truth, Talking Wall Pictures (in development)
- Year of Dangerous Days, with Tom Fontana, 2021
- Dominoes (pilot)

=== Translations ===
- Quetzalcoatl Puddle by Irela de Viller, translated from Spanish to English, The Lark's Mexico/U.S. Exchange, 2009
- Anestesia by Agnieska Hernandez Diaz, translated from Spanish to English, Two River Theater Company, 2015

=== Published works ===
- Learning Curve, Best New Plays by New Playwrights of 2005, Smith and Kraus
- The Baseball Plays: 7th Inning Stretch, 2008
- Plays from South Coast Repertory: Hispanic Playwrights Project Anthology, 2008
- Illuminating Veronica, New York: Broadway Play Publishing, 2009
- Arrivals and Departures, New York: Broadway Play Publishing Inc, 2009
- All Eyes and Ears, New York: Broadway Play Publishing Inc, 2010
- 2010 Colorado New Play Summit, 2010
- Ping Pong, New York: Broadway Play Publishing Inc, 2016
- Blind Date, New York: Broadway Play Publishing Inc, 2022

== Recognition ==
- 2001 Princess Grace Award, I Regret She's Made of Sugar
- 2006 NEA / TCG Grant
- 2012-2014, Mid-Career Fellowship, Lark Theater Company
- Edgerton Foundation New Play Award, Blind Date
- Citation of Excellence, Laurents/Hatcher Foundation, Blind Date
- Alfred P. Sloan Foundation New Science and Technology Initiative Grant, Denver Center Theatre Company. When Tang Met Laika
- 2017 Guggenheim Fellowship
- New York Foundation for the Arts Award
- James Hammerstein Award
- Drama League Award, Outstanding Interactive or Socially Distanced Theater
- Hermitage Artist Residency
