= NBC Kids =

American children's television programming block (2012–2016)

- Network: NBC (2012–16); Telemundo (2012–17); (produced by Sprout)
- Launched: July 7, 2012; 14 years ago
- Closed: September 25, 2016; 10 years ago (NBC); December 31, 2017; 8 years ago (Telemundo; MiTelemundo)
- Country of origin: United States
- Owner: NBCUniversal
- Format: Saturday morning pre-school block
- Running time: 3 hours
- Official website: nbc.com/nbc-kids (Archive link)

NBC Kids was an American Weekend morning children's television programming block that aired on NBC from July 7, 2012 to September 25, 2016. Telemundo also aired a version of the block under the "MiTelemundo" title, which featured a separate lineup of Spanish-dubbed programs until December 31, 2017. NBC Kids, which replaced the Qubo block (as a result of NBCUniversal withdrawing the joint venture, which also included Ion Media Networks), was programmed by the Sprout preschool cable network, as they were both targeted at children ages 2 to 6.

The three-hour block featured educational entertainment series for younger children, which met programming requirements defined by the FCC's Children's Television Act, and is the first block to air in high definition by NBC completing its conversion to the quality.

The block came to an end on September 25, 2016, and was replaced the following week with a live-action E/I block from Litton Entertainment named The More You Know (named inspired by its public service announcement campaign), marking the end of traditional Saturday morning children's programming on broadcast television.

== History ==
In 2012, NBCUniversal withdrew from the Qubo joint venture, with Ion Media Networks acquiring NBCUniversal's interest. On March 28 of that year, NBC announced that the three-hour children's programming time period allocated by the network on Saturday mornings would be programmed by Sprout (which had become a sister television property to NBC following NBCUniversal's 2010 majority purchase by Comcast; NBC later took full ownership of the network, whose owners previously included PBS, Sesame Workshop and HIT Entertainment) and launch a new Saturday morning block called NBC Kids, which was aimed at preschoolers and grade school-aged children ages 2 to 6. Sprout also produced a Spanish-language sister block for Telemundo known as MiTelemundo.

NBC Kids and MiTelemundo both debuted on July 7, 2012, one week after the Qubo block ended its run on NBC on June 30, followed by Telemundo on July 1. This left Ion Television (and later Ion Plus) as the only network to retain a Qubo-branded children's block, until Qubo Channel ceased operations on February 28, 2021, as the E.W. Scripps Company is now the owner of Ion Media, which they acquired on January 7, 2021.

=== Closure ===
On February 24, 2016, NBCUniversal announced that it had entered into a programming agreement with Litton Entertainment to launch a new Saturday morning E/I block replacing NBC Kids. The block would be replaced on October 8, 2016 by The More You Know (named inspired by its public service announcement campaign), a block produced by Litton Entertainment (now Hearst Media Production Group) that would feature live-action documentary and lifestyle programs aimed at pre-teens and teenagers. The move came as part of a shift by broadcast television networks towards using their Saturday morning lineup solely to comply with the educational programming requirements mandated by the Federal Communications Commission (FCC), along with the cultural shift towards cable and online video on demand viewing of children's and animated programming. NBC Kids aired for the final time on September 25, 2016. Despite this, MiTelemundo continued to broadcast on Telemundo until December 31, 2017, when it was replaced by a Spanish-language version of The More You Know the following week under the same name.

== Programming ==
=== NBC Kids ===
==== Programming from Sprout ====
Title	Premiere date	End date	Source(s)
Noodle and Doodle	July 7, 2012	September 25, 2016	
Pajanimals	July 7, 2012	January 26, 2014	
The Chica Show	February 2, 2013	September 25, 2016	
Astroblast!	October 4, 2014	July 10, 2016	
Ruff-Ruff, Tweet and Dave	July 4, 2015	September 25, 2016	
Nina's World	January 2, 2016	September 25, 2016	
Floogals	February 6, 2016	September 25, 2016	
Terrific Trucks	July 16, 2016	September 25, 2016	

==== Acquired programming ====
Title	Premiere date	End date	Source(s)
Poppy Cat	July 7, 2012	September 26, 2015	
Justin Time	July 7, 2012	September 27, 2015	
LazyTown	July 7, 2012	March 26, 2016	
The Wiggles	July 7, 2012	January 26, 2013	
Tree Fu Tom	June 8, 2013	December 26, 2015	
Make Way for Noddy	October 12, 2013	March 29, 2014	
Zou	April 5, 2014	September 27, 2015	
Earth to Luna!	April 4, 2015	January 30, 2016	
Clangers	October 3, 2015	March 26, 2016	

=== MiTelemundo ===
==== Programming from Sprout ====
Title	Premiere date	End date	Source(s)
Noodle and Doodle	July 8, 2012	December 31, 2017	
The Chica Show	July 6, 2014	December 31, 2017	
Nina's World	2015	December 31, 2017	

==== Acquired programming ====
Title	Premiere date	End date	Source(s)
Raggs	July 7, 2012	September 24, 2016	
Jay Jay the Jet Plane	July 7, 2012	June 29, 2014	
LazyTown	July 7, 2012	September 24, 2016	
Maya the Bee	2017	December 31, 2017	

== See also ==
- Children's Programming on NBC
- List of programs broadcast by Universal Kids
- Universal Kids
- TeleXitos
