= Quiet Please!: Bawal ang Maingay =

Philippine television game show

- Genre: Game show
- Written by: Jovany Ponce; Julius Tan
- Directed by: Ivan Dedicatoria
- Presented by: Richard Gomez; K Brosas
- Country of origin: Philippines
- Original language: Filipino
- No. of seasons: 1
- No. of episodes: 23

Production
- Executive producers: Rose Camia; Mark Liam Manzano Plotena

Original release
- Network: TV5
- Release: August 10, 2014 – January 11, 2015

Quiet Please!: Bawal ang Maingay is a Philippine television game show broadcast by TV5. The show is based on the American game show The Noise. Hosted by Richard Gomez and K Brosas, it aired from August 10, 2014 to January 11, 2015, replacing Jasmine and was replaced by Mac and Chiz.

== Segments ==
- Round 1: Small but Terrible
- Round 2: Major Trouble
- Round 3: Salo-Salo Together

== Hosts ==
- Richard Gomez
- K Brosas
