= Big Sister, Little Brother =

Children's animated TV series

- Countries of origin: Sweden; Germany
- Original language: Swedish

Production
- Production companies: Wegelius TV; TMO Film GmbH

Original release
- Network: SVT
- Release: 1997

Big Sister, Little Brother (Storasyster & Lillebror) is a preschool animated TV series that first aired on SVT in Sweden in 1997. It is based on a series of children's books by Anders Jacobsson and Sören Olsson. The series was globally distributed by HIT Entertainment in most territories.

== Plot summary ==
This show is about a young girl and her younger brother playing in and exploring the world around them.

== International telecast ==
In the U.S., it was first screened on the Captain Kangaroo spin-off Mr. Moose's Fun Time on Fox Family Channel on August 17, 1998. From 2005 until 2009, it aired in repeats on PBS Kids Sprout (now as Universal Kids).

== Characters ==
- Big Sister is a redheaded girl in a small pink dress.
- Little Brother is a blond-haired boy in diapers.
- Mummy and Daddy are the title children's parents.
- Big Brother is the title children's sibling.
- Big Sister and Little Brother's Friends

== Episodes (Series 1-2) ==
1. The Ice Cream
2. The Radio
3. The Raspberries
4. Little Accident
5. The Hole
6. The Nursery School
7. The Rip
8. The Vacuum Cleaner
9. The Fancy Dress Chest
10. The Babysitter
11. The Presents
12. Water
13. The Postcard
14. Hide and Seek
15. The Snuggle
16. The Bullies
17. The Dog
18. Drawing
19. The Mushrooms
20. The Ants
21. Father Christmas
22. The Kiss
23. The Friends
24. Fantasy Day
25. Hidden Key
26. The Life Jacket
