= Floogals =

British-French animated series

- Genre: Comic science fiction Educational; Preschool; Adventure; Slapstick
- Created by: Ceri Barnes; Nigel Pickard; Douglas Wood; Lee Walters; Rick Gitelson
- Based on: Concept by Absolutely Cuckoo Ltd.
- Directed by: Ruth Ducker; Paul Donnellon
- Voices of: Rasmus Hardiker; Jules de Jongh; Angela Griffin; Hugo Harold-Harrison; Dan Wright; Tom Clarke Hill
- Countries of origin: United Kingdom; United States
- Original language: English
- No. of seasons: 3
- No. of episodes: 130

Production
- Executive producers: James Cabourne; Nigel Pickard
- Producers: Matt Porter; Ceri Barnes
- Running time: 11 minutes
- Production companies: Nevision Studios; Jellyfish Pictures; Zodiak Kids Studios

Original release
- Network: Nick Jr. (UK); Sprout/Universal Kids (US)
- Release: January 23, 2016 – March 22, 2020

Floogals is a live-action/animated television series aimed at preschoolers, produced by Nevision Studios, Jellyfish Pictures and Zodiak Kids, with concepts from Absolutely Cuckoo. Sprout, a children's TV channel in the United States which commissioned the series, also participated in the production. The series was developed by Ceri Barnes, Lee Walters, Nigel Pickard and Rick Gitelson, from an original idea by Dan Good (who created Waybuloo). Tiny aliens are Fleeker, Flo and Boomer, who find questions and exploring. Production took place in London during 2014 and 2015 with all CGI animation by Jellyfish Pictures. The series was first broadcast in the United States as a 'Sprout original series', and series 2 and 3 have been subsequently commissioned.

In September 2019, it was confirmed that series three would be the final series and that production had ended. The show aired its final episode on March 22, 2020.

== Synopsis and overview ==
The show centers on three four-inch tall extraterrestrials called Floogals who have come to Earth to study its inhabitants. Upon landing, a human boy, thinking their spaceship is a toy, hangs their craft onto the ceiling of his bedroom. The Floogals, however, don't seem to mind as they carry on with their studying.

While the show is set in a real Earthly place featuring live-action humans, the Floogals are CGI.

During each episode, the Floogals come across an object on Earth of which they try to gain knowledge. Once their study is done, they pass their research to the base on their home planet. After the report is sent, if it is liked, the floogals receive a sticker each featuring the object they have just researched.

== Characters ==
=== Floogals ===
The three protagonists consist of two male lavender colored with blue or purple horns and one female pink colored with red horns extraterrestrials in red-orange, yellow and green space suits and headgears. While they lack noses, they each have four trumpet-shaped colored blue (Fleeker), red (Flo) and purple (Boomer) protrusions on their heads which are used for both hearing and smelling.

- Fleeker, the Captain — Fleeker is a male Floogal with red-orange uniform, lavender skin and blue floogal horns. His uniform and helmet can glow in darkness. Like his friends, Flo and Boomer, he is always wearing his alien outfit. Fleeker and Boomer are best friends forever. He addresses self "Captain Fleeker." Voiced by Miles J. Harvey and David Hornsby in US version and Rasmus Hardiker in UK Version.
- Flo, the First Officer — Flo is the only female floogal of the main cast and has yellow uniform, pink skin and red floogal horns. Her floogal horns are all bunched upward, her lower two horns do not come downward near her neck like with the males. She addresses self "First Officer Flo." Voiced by Jules de Jongh in US version and Angela Griffin in UK version.
- Boomer, Junior Floogal — Boomer is very similar to Captain Fleeker Floogal, but is smaller, has a green uniform, lavender skin and purple floogal horns instead of blue. He doesn't have Floogalzooger Kit. He addresses self "Junior Floogal Boomer." Voiced by Hugo Harold-Harrison in US version and Dan Wright in UK version.

=== Joining in Season 2 with Fleeker, Flo and Boomer ===
- Fee, the Roving Reporter — Fee is female just like Flo and she wears a light blue uniform, with a little robot buddy named Doodle. She has lavender skin instead of pink and purple floogal horns instead of red. She has premiered first time in season 2. Her Floogal Horns are just like Flo's. She's been seen in only a couple episodes, so she's a character not really known. Voiced by Natalie Palamides.

=== Hoomans ===
The human family whose house is where the Floogals are stationed at. Their faces are kept secretly hidden from the picture.

- Dad aka "Dad Hooman" — his name is Michael as mentioned in the episode, "Project:Washer/Dryer". He is voiced by Chris Corcoran.
- Evie aka "Girl Hooman" — She is five years old, as heard in "Project:Balloon."
- Luke ("Lukie") King aka "Boy Hooman" — He is eight years old, as heard and shown in "Project: Birthday Cake."
- Mom aka "Mom Hooman" — her name is Gaby as mentioned in "Project Power Outage", and her surname is mentioned in "Project Halloween" when a kid compliments her on her Jack-o-Lantern, calling her Mrs. King
- Aunt Samantha — Evie & Luke's aunt in "Project Baby".
- Hugo — Evie & Luke's baby cousin in "Project Baby".
- The Gundersons — neighbors of the Kings, mentioned in “Project Mole”.

=== Animals ===
- Scruffy the Dog.
- Toby the Tortoise.
- Bella the Cat.
- Theo the Rabbit.
- Edwin the Caterpillar.

== Episodes ==
There are 130 episodes each 11 minutes.

=== Season 1 (2016) ===
1. Project: Ice
2. Project: Tortoise
3. Project: Balloon
4. Project: Trumpet
5. Project: Flashlight
6. Project: Baby
7. Project: Leash
8. Project: Puzzle
9. Project: Bubbles
10. Project: Halloween
11. Project: Mirror
12. Project: Banana
13. Project: Sleepover
14. Project: Clock
15. Project: Helicopter
16. Project: Toothbrush
17. Project: Washer Dryer
18. Project: Glue
19. Project: Rubberbands
20. Project: Sand
21. Project: Boxes
22. Project: Egg Hunt
23. Project: Caterpillar
24. Project: Clay
25. Project: Garden Hose
26. Project: Piano
27. Project: Tent
28. Project: Popcorn
29. Project: Dusting
30. Project: Seeds
31. Project: Rollerskates
32. Project: Picnic
33. Project: Rabbit
34. Project: Painting
35. Project: Singing
36. Project: Record Player
37. Project: Table Tennis
38. Project: Robot
39. Project: Birthday Cake
40. Project: Mail
41. Project: Magnet
42. Project: Ring
43. Project: Umbrella
44. Project: Bandages
45. Project: Vacuum
46. Project: Jewelry Box
47. Project: Vacation
48. Project: Aluminum Foil
49. Project: Hamster
50. Project: Pencil
51. Project: Rainbow
52. Project: Kite

=== Season 2 (2018) ===
1. Project: Puppet Show
2. Project: Instant Camera
3. Project: Doll
4. Project: Cast
5. Project: Board Game
6. Project: Training Wheels
7. Project: Guitar
8. Project: Fear Of The Dark
9. Project: Miniature Golf
10. Project: Lemonade
11. Project: Frog
12. Project: Camper
13. Project: Library
14. Project: Decorating
15. Project: Hide & Seek
16. Project: Building Blocks
17. Project: Show and Tell
18. Project: Floatie
19. Project: Scarecrow
20. Project: School Bus
21. Project: Fish
22. Project: Piggy Bank
23. Project: Perfume
24. Project: Magic Trick
25. Project: First Aid Kit
26. Project: Film Projector
27. Project: Tide Pool
28. Project: Flu
29. Project: Fall
30. Project: Camouflage
31. Project: Dress-up
32. Project: Fingerprints
33. Project: Fee and the Band
34. Project: Train Set
35. Project: Wildlife
36. Project: Hair Cut
37. Project: Baby Tooth
38. Project: Fitness with Fee
39. Project: Chicks
40. Project: Owl
41. Project: Pillow Fort
42. Project: Duck
43. Project: Power Outage
44. Project: Padlock
45. Project: Dancing Together
46. Project: Dog Training
47. Project: Metal Detector
48. Project: Donate
49. Project: Lunch Box
50. Project: Valentine’s Card
51. Project: Snow
52. Project: Christmas Tree

=== Season 3 (2020) ===
1. Project: Greenhouse
2. Project: Hula Hoop
3. Project: Sunscreen
4. Project: Grocery Shopping
5. Project: Singing Machine
6. Project: Model Kit
7. Project: Basketball
8. Project: Hot Air Balloon
9. Project: Birds Nest
10. Project: Riding Lesson
11. Project: Shoe laces
12. Project: Bouncy Castle
13. Project: Moth
14. Project: Tool Box
15. Project: Wishing Fountain
16. Project: Connect the Dots
17. Project: Tag
18. Project: Treasure Map
19. Project: Vet
20. Project: Foosball
21. Project: Sewing Machine
22. Project: Bowling
23. Project: Ice Lolly
24. Project: Mole
25. Project: Sheep
26. Project: Spider Web

=== Shorts ===
Seven shorts were made.

- Floogals Discover Ice
- Floogals Welcome to Earth (Pilot)
- Floogals - Banana
- Floogals - Turtle
- Today's Project - Washer Dryer
- Floogal Your World
- Blooper Reel

== Broadcast ==
The series premiered in the United States on January 23, 2016, on what was known as Sprout, a specialty television channel owned by Comcast's NBCUniversal. Upon the channel's relaunch as Universal Kids on September 9, 2017, the Sprout brand was used as a name of the programming block for preschoolers until January 26, 2018, when the block was renamed Universal Kids preschool. The series was also shown on NBC's NBC Kids television block until the block's cancellation in September 2016.

In Canada, the series was broadcast in English on TVOntario's TVOKids block and Knowledge Network and in French on TFO.

In the United Kingdom, the Scottish Gaelic version was broadcast on BBC Alba, and the English version was later broadcast on Channel 5's Milkshake! block in July 2017.

In Australia, the series was broadcast on ABC2's ABC Kids block.

In Ireland, the series was broadcast on RTÉ and 3Kids.

In South Africa, the series was broadcast on eToonz.

In Arab countries, the series was broadcast on MBC 3.

In German, the series was broadcast on Super RTL.

In France, the series was broadcast on Piwi+.
