= The Sunny Side Up Show =

Sprout morning programming block

Sunny Side Up
- Logo from 2007 to 2009
- Network: PBS Kids Sprout; Sprout (9:00 am–12:00 pm)
- Launched: September 26, 2007; 18 years ago
- Closed: August 11, 2017; 8 years ago
- Country of origin: United States
- Formerly known as: The Birthday Show; The Sunny Side Up Show
- Format: 480i (SDTV) (2007–2013) (seasons 1-6); 1080i (HDTV) (2013–2017) (seasons 7-10)
- Running time: 3 hours
- Original language: English

Sunny Side Up (previously known as The Sunny Side Up Show) was a television programming block which premiered on Sprout on September 26, 2007 and ended on August 11, 2017. Each week, a new theme was introduced, including food, Halloween, animals, construction, fall, opposites, and birthdays. Sunny Side Up aired at 9:00 a.m. Eastern/8:00 a.m. Central until 12:00 p.m. Eastern/11:00 a.m. Central each weekday morning. The hosts of Sunny Side Up played games, sang songs, told stories, and showed birthday cards or artwork.

Sunny Side Up was Sprout's morning program. It was produced live every weekday, and hosted by a human host along with Chica, a chicken puppet who later got her own show. Before moving to a "city apartment" set, the show took place on a set dubbed The Sunshine Barn and decorated with farm-themed objects. Each host was on the show for one week with each week's host being announced late in the previous week. The host introduced programs, read birthdays, led activities related to the week's theme, and read messages sent in by individual "Sproutlet" viewers through the Sprout website. There were daily activities such as "The Good Egg Awards" (renamed "The Kindness Kid Awards") celebrating viewers' accomplishments, and "Sproutlet Stories" allowed "Sproutlets" to tell different stories with different plots, characters, and settings.

The theme tune from 2007 to 2013 was Brand New Day. From 2013 to 2015 it instead was Chica's Here.

Some episodes of the show were supposedly archived by IMDb and on-demand services since Sprout rebranded, and a few can be found on YouTube.

== Origins and history ==
Andrew Beecham, Sprout's senior vice president of programming, knew he wanted a live show, so executives agreed that a live show with guest appearances from Sprout characters, viewer submissions, and weekly themes would be perfect for Sprout. The block first premiered on September 26, 2007, two years exact after the Sprout channel launched with Kelly Vrooman and Kevin Yamada alongside Chica the puppet chicken as the first hosts, Sean Roach joined the founding trio of presenters the following year.

On September 25, 2010, to celebrate the launch of the Sprout original series Noodle and Doodle, the block expanded to include Saturday and Sunday weekend morning broadcasts instead of just taking the weekend off and handing over to The Let’s Go Show, another Sprout programming block at the time. It was around the time that the set was remodeled, now featuring a green flower-shaped clock and a red and blue crate.

For several years, The Sunny Side Up Show was taped at the Comcast Center in Philadelphia, Pennsylvania before moving to 30 Rockefeller Plaza in New York City in 2014, as Sprout was acquired by NBCUniversal the previous year, in a studio not too far from The Roots' wardrobe rack. Since the move to New York, Sprout started snagging celebrity guest stars to appear on the program after they appeared on The Today Show.

== 2007 ==
The block starts with the host and Chica greeting the viewers and explaining the date/weather and the day's theme.

The next segment involves birthday cards and wishes. Mr. Mailman, a mailman puppet, would send the cards to the "Sunshine Barn".

The next segment involves a different song or dance each day.

The next segment involves the hosts making a craft or cooking a recipe. Based on the app "Dress Chica", during a show that comes on at 10:00 a.m., the hosts would demonstrate the viewers’ idea of Chica's disguise. Dress Chica was created since executives wanted a game and segment that would help kids get dressed. A Dress Chica app was released by New Wave Entertainment in 2009, alongside "Sprout Player" and "Dress Like Chica."

In the Good Egg Awards, formerly part of the segment "Farm Talk," the hosts would read different awards given to viewers online.

Next, the hosts would do a dance titled the Barnyard Boogie. In 2013, the segment was replaced with a new segment titled Sproutlet Stories, where viewers online could make up three different stories: a pirate adventure, a royal adventure, and a space adventure.

In 2014, a new penultimate segment was added, titled Chica's Choice, where a five-inch spinning wheel would be spun to direct everyone to do something "fun". The next segment involves sharing the remainder birthday cards and wishes.

From 2010 to 2017, the hosts would host the Sproutlet News Report, where viewers could share what they did and how they showed care for each other, with amazing voicemails. The hosts would close the block by telling viewers to stay tuned for the Sprout Sharing Show and The Good Night Show.

== 2015–2017 ==
In September 2015, as part of Sprout's new design, the setting was changed to a city apartment.

The birthday cards and wishes were still going, as well as crafts. Temporarily, the Dress Chica, Chica's Choice, Sproutlet Stories and Sproutlet News Report were removed from the block. In 2017, Chica was removed to make way for the Sprout House block.

== Cast ==
=== Hosts ===
- Carly Ciarrocchi hosted the show from June 4, 2012, replacing Liz, to August 11, 2017, when she became the host of Sprout House (the show's spiritual successor).
- Tim Kubart hosted the show from December 30, 2013, replacing Sean and was one of the winners of the Host Hunt contest, up to August 11, 2017. Kubart is also a kindie artist and plays the tambourine for Postmodern Jukebox.
- Chica, a chicken puppet who co-hosted Sunny Side Up with Emily, Carly, Tim, and Kaitlin. Before moving to a city apartment, she lived in the "Sunshine Barn". She had a voice which resembled a squeaky toy. Her character had been part of the show from 2007 to 2017. She also made occasional appearances on both The Sprout Sharing Show and its successor Sprout Control Room. Executives wanted the puppet co-host to be a chicken, though Beecham thought preschoolers couldn't connect well with chickens, and worked with a designer to make sure the puppet was cute enough. One of the reasons for Chica's squeaking was because her puppeteers ("Chicateers") were all associate producers who would help out in the control room on the third of a three-week cycle. Over the years, Chica has been played by the likes of Forrest Harding, Brendan Gawel (who also played Curtis E. Owl on The Sprout Sharing Show), Edward Pokropski, Jenn Santee, Jackie Payton, Scott McClennen, Kimberly Diaz, and Matt Fornwald.
- Kevin Yamada hosted The Show from September 26, 2007, having previously hosted The Birthday Show, to December 25, 2009, announcing he was moving to the big city, and was replaced by Dennisha. Yamada also played Ricky Rabbit on The Sprout Sharing Show.
- Liz Filios hosted the show from November 1, 2010 to June 4, 2012, when she was replaced by Carly.
- Sean Roach hosted the show from early 2008 to December 13, 2013, focusing more on his arts. Roach also hosted Noodle and Doodle, Sprout's first full-length original series.
- One of the first two hosts (alongside Kevin), Kelly Vrooman hosted the show from September 26, 2007 to December 20, 2013, hosting the Kindest Kid special on the next two days. Vrooman also played Patty Pig on The Sprout Sharing Show and Kelly on The Chica Show.
- Dennisha Pratt hosted the show from December 31, 2009, replacing Kevin, to June 13, 2014, when she and her family moved away. She was replaced by Emily.
- Kaitlin Becker hosted the show from January 6, 2014, replacing Kelly and was one of the winners of the Host Hunt contest, up to May 19, 2017. Becker also plays Meekah in the Blippi franchise.
- Emily Borromeo hosted the show from May 23, 2014, replacing Dennisha, to June 29, 2017.

=== Recurring characters ===
- Mr. Mailman was a cartoon character who used to appear on The Birthday Show and on The Sunny Side Up Show during Birthdays. He also appeared in a short-form series titled The New Adventures of Mr. Mailman.
- Rico was Chica's cousin who made occasional appearances.
- Chica's Nana made occasional appearances, usually alongside Rico.

=== Guest stars ===
The following is a list of television programs from which guest stars originated, and the characters from those programs which appeared on Sunny Side Up:

- Barney & Friends: Barney, Riff
- The Good Night Show: Nina
- The Let's Go Show: Miles
- Bounce: Elizabeth
- Elizabeth Mitchell
- (also known as Banjo in The Let's Go Show), M'Goats
