= Evans Johnson =

19th century Irish Anglican priest (1802–1879)

Ven. John Evans Johnson, D.D. (1802 – 23 March 1879) was an Irish Anglican priest.

Johnson was from Ballyroan, Dublin and educated at Trinity College, Dublin, the son of Hon. Justice Robert Johnson. He was appointed Archdeacon of Ferns from 1848 to 1870.

He married Harriet Trench, great niece of Baron Ashtown, in 1831 in Sussex.
