= Top Chef Junior =

American television series

- Genre: Reality competition; Cooking show
- Presented by: Vanessa Lachey
- Judges: Curtis Stone; Gail Simmons; Tiffany Derry; Antonia Lofaso; Graham Elliot
- Country of origin: United States
- Original language: English
- No. of seasons: 2
- No. of episodes: 29

Production
- Executive producers: Dan Cutforth; Casey Kriley
- Production company: Magical Elves

Original release
- Network: Universal Kids
- Release: October 13, 2017 – December 1, 2018

Related
- Top Chef

Top Chef Junior is an American reality competition television series that serves as a spin-off of the popular Top Chef series. Ordered in 2008 for an eight-episode run on Bravo, the show had never aired, nor is it known if any episodes were produced at that time. However, nine years later, Top Chef Junior was mentioned as the marquee program for Universal Kids, an NBCUniversal-owned children's channel launched on September 9, 2017. Season 1 consisted of 14 episodes and feature 12 young chefs, aged 9–14. The winner receives $50,000 and the title of Top Chef Junior. The show is hosted by actress Vanessa Lachey, with Top Chef Masters and Top Chef Duels host Curtis Stone serving as its head judge. Top Chef Junior premiered on October 13, 2017. In November 2017 Top Chef Junior was renewed for a 2nd season, which premiered on September 8, 2018. It consists of 12 finalist chefs aged 9–14.

== Season 1 ==
=== Season 1 Contestants ===
| Name | Age | Hometown |
|---|---|---|
| Audrey Brust | 11 | Zachary, LA |
| Fernando Valdés Nicholson | 11 | Elmhurst, IL |
| Fuller Goldsmith (†) | 13 | Tuscaloosa, AL |
| Henry Wieser | 13 | Naperville, IL |
| Jasmine Bell | 13 | Charlotte, NC |
| Katelyn Rickert | 11 | New Orleans, LA |
| Kenzie Mills | 12 | Midlothian, TX |
| Max Gerber | 11 | New York, NY |
| Maxine Sutton | 13 | Los Angeles, CA |
| Milo Fleming | 13 | St. Paul, MN |
| Owen Pereira | 13 | Baltimore, MD |
| Rahanna Martinez | 13 | Oakland, CA |

=== Elimination table ===
| Episode # | | 1 | 2 | 3 | 4 | 5 | 6 | 7 | 8 | 9 | 10 | 11 | 12 | 13 | 14 |
|---|---|---|---|---|---|---|---|---|---|---|---|---|---|---|---|
| Quickfire Challenge Winner(s) | | Milo | Jasmine | Jasmine | Milo | Owen | Henry^{1} Maxine^{1} | Rahanna | Milo^{2} | Henry | Rahanna^{1} | Henry^{1} | Milo^{1} | Owen^{1} | N/A |
| Contestant | | Elimination Challenge Results | | | | | | | | | | | | | |
| 1 | Owen | HIGH | HIGH | IN | IN | IN | LOW | LOW | IN | WIN | HIGH | HIGH | IN | WIN | WINNER |
| 2 | Rahanna | WIN | HIGH | IN | WIN | HIGH | WIN | IN | IN | LOW | IN | LOW | SAVED | LOW | RUNNER-UP |
| 3 | Milo | IN | HIGH | LOW | IN | LOW | WIN | WIN | WIN | SAVED | LOW | WIN | WIN | OUT | |
| 4 | Henry | HIGH | LOW | IN | HIGH | HIGH | IN | HIGH | IN | HIGH | WIN | OUT | | | |
| 5 | Jasmine | IN | IN | IN | SAVED | LOW | HIGH | HIGH | IN | LOW | OUT | | | | |
| 6 | Kenzie | LOW | IN | LOW | HIGH | WIN | HIGH | LOW | OUT | | | | | | |
| 7 | Maxine | IN | IN | HIGH | LOW | LOW | SAVED | OUT | | | | | | | |
| 8 | Fuller | IN | WIN | IN | LOW | HIGH | WDR^{3} | | | | | | | | |
| 9 | Audrey | HIGH | LOW | WIN | IN | OUT | | | | | | | | | |
| 10 | Max | IN | LOW | OUT | | | | | | | | | | | |
| 11 | Katelyn | LOW | OUT | | | | | | | | | | | | |
| 12 | Fernando | OUT | | | | | | | | | | | | | |

^Note 1: The chef(s) did not receive immunity for winning the Quickfire Challenge.
^Note 2: While Milo was chosen as the overall winner, both Rahanna and Jasmine were also awarded immunity for placing in the top of the Quickfire Challenge.
^Note 3: Fuller withdrew from the competition due to health concerns.

(WINNER) The chef won the season and was crowned "Top Chef Junior".
(RUNNER-UP) The chef was a runner-up for the season.
(WIN) The chef won the Elimination Challenge.
(HIGH) The chef was selected as one of the top entries in the Elimination Challenge but did not win.
(IN) The chef was not selected as one of the top or bottom entries in the Elimination Challenge and was safe.
(LOW) The chef was selected as one of the bottom entries in the Elimination Challenge but was not eliminated.
(SAVED) The chef lost the Elimination Challenge but pulled a save card and continued in the competition.
(OUT) The chef lost the Elimination Challenge and was eliminated.
(WDR) The chef voluntarily withdrew from the competition.

=== Episode 1: Dishing Up Dreams ===
Original airdate: October 13, 2017

- Quickfire Challenge: Transform your family favorite meal into a restaurant quality masterpiece
  - Winner: Milo
- Elimination Challenge: Create a dish that showcases your food dream
- Guest judge: Richard Blais
  - Winner: Rahanna
  - Out: Fernando

=== Episode 2: Food Truck Frenzy ===
Original airdate: October 20, 2017

- Quickfire Challenge: Highlight your cooking technique in a dished based on a memorable adventure
  - Winner: Jasmine
- Elimination Challenge: In less than 24 hours, open 3 food trucks to the public

| Team Name | Team Members |
|---|---|
| Taco Town | Katelyn, Kenzie, Maxine, Milo |
| Gourmet Sandwich Truck | Fuller, Henry, Owen |
| Oh Crepe! | Audrey, Jasmine, Max, Rahanna |

- Guest judge: Dave Danhi
  - Winner: Fuller
  - Out: Katelyn

=== Episode 3: Battle of the Buds ===
Original airdate: October 27, 2017

- Quickfire Challenge: Create an ice cream dessert
  - Winner: Jasmine
- Elimination Challenge: Create a dish highlighting one of the five tastes

| Taste Battle | Orange Team | Blue Team |
|---|---|---|
| Bitter | Owen | **Fuller** |
| Sour | **Audrey** | Kenzie |
| Salty | **Maxine** | Max |
| Umami | Henry | **Rahanna** |
| Sweet | **Jasmine** | Milo |

Battle winners in Bold

- Guest judge: Brooke Williamson
  - Winner: Audrey
  - Out: Max

=== Episode 4: Chef's Best Friend ===
Original airdate: November 3, 2017

- Quickfire Challenge: Make a gourmet dog treat
  - Winner: Milo
- Elimination Challenge: Create a cohesive meal using ingredients typically found in your refrigerators at home

| Team | Team Members |
|---|---|
| Red | Fuller, Jasmine, Maxine |
| Blue | Audrey, Owen, Milo |
| Yellow | Kenzie, Henry, Rahanna |

- Guest judge: Sherry Yard
  - Winner: Rahanna
  - Safe: Jasmine

=== Episode 5: Food Fight! ===
Original airdate: November 10, 2017

- Quickfire Challenge: Impress Bryan Voltaggio and Michael Voltaggio with your culinary skills
  - Winner: Owen
- Elimination Challenge: Four head-to-head 30 minute food fight rounds coached by Bryan and Michael Voltaggio

| Battle Rounds | Team Bryan (Red) | Team Michael (Blue) |
|---|---|---|
| 1: Soft-boiled Egg | Audrey | **Fuller** |
| 2: Filleted Branzio | **Kenzie** | Maxine |
| 3: Medium Rare Steak | **Henry** | Milo |
| 4: Plated Dessert | **Rahanna** | Jasmine |

Battle winners in Bold

- Guest judge: Tito Ortiz
  - Winner: Kenzie
  - Out: Audrey

=== Episode 6: It's No Cake Walk ===
Original airdate: November 17, 2017

- Quickfire Challenge: In pairs, using only one hand each, make a dozen cupcakes
  - Winner: Henry & Maxine
- Elimination Challenge: Bake a 14-inch extreme cake

| Team | Team Members |
|---|---|
| Red | Rahanna & Milo |
| Blue | Kenzie & Jasmine |
| Yellow | Owen & Maxine |
| Teal | Henry & Fuller |

- Guest judge: Joshua John Russell
  - Winner: Rahanna & Milo
  - Safe: Maxine
  - Withdraw: Fuller

=== Episode 7: Glow Big or Go Home ===
Original airdate: December 1, 2017

- Quickfire Challenge: Make a dish using a cut of beef selected from the "Beef or Buzzer" game board
  - Winner: Rahanna
- Elimination Challenge: Using at least one ingredient that glows, make a late night dish for Maisy Stella's Glow Party
- Guest judge: Casey Thompson
  - Winner: Milo
  - Out: Maxine

=== Episode 8: Field Day! ===
Original airdate: December 8, 2017

- Quickfire Challenge: Create an elevated nacho dish
  - Winner: Milo
    - The overall winner won a Buzzfeed Tasty Video prize. The top 3 in the quickfire challenges also won immunity.
- Elimination Challenge: (Top 3) Create a spin on burger & fries or (Bottom 3) BBQ plate with a side & sauce
- Guest judge: Nick Lachey
  - Winner: Milo
  - Out: Kenzie

=== Episode 9: Un-bee-lievable ===
Original airdate: December 15, 2017

- Quickfire Challenge: Make a dish highlighting honey
  - Winner: Henry
- Elimination Challenge: Create a kids' menu with an elevated entrée, side & dessert
- Guest judge: Emeril Lagasse
  - Winner: Owen
  - Safe: Milo

=== Episode 10: Restaurant Wars ===
Original airdate: January 5, 2018

- Quickfire Challenge: Create an amuse-bouche
  - Winner: Rahanna
- Elimination Challenge: Create and design 2 restaurants to open in 24 hours

| Team | Team Members |
|---|---|
| Forage & Create (Blue) | Henry & Owen |
| Summer House (Orange) | Jasmine & Milo |

- For winning the quickfire challenge, Rahanna was assigned to both teams
- Guest judge: Cat Cora
  - Winner: Henry
  - Out: Jasmine

=== Episode 11: The Claw ===
Original airdate: January 12, 2018

- Quickfire Challenge: Cook a lobster dish using the basic pantry or add ingredients from the claw game
  - Winner: Henry
- Elimination Challenge: Create an exotic surf & turf dish ( snake and crocodile food )
- as Henry wins, he is allowed to choose a protein and then no one is allowed to choose that protein
- Guest judge: Dave Salmoni
  - Winner: Milo
  - Out: Henry

=== Episode 12: Cooking for Treasure ===
Original airdate::January 19, 2018

- Quickfire Challenge: "Keepin' Up With Curtis." Chefs are challenged to replicate Head Judge Curtis Stone's dish alongside him.
  - Winner: Milo
- Elimination Challenge: After a tiki-themed scavenger hunt at Universal Orlando Volcano Bay, create a Polynesian luau
- Guest judge: Roy Yamaguchi
  - Winner: Milo
  - Safe: Rahanna

=== Episode 13: Lemon Aid ===
Original airdate::January 26, 2018

- Quickfire Challenge: At the Houdini Estate, chefs must unlock boxes to retrieve proteins.
  - Winner: Owen
- Elimination Challenge: As part of a fundraiser in connection with Alex's Lemonade Stand, chefs must prepare a dish featuring lemons.
- Guest judge: Susan Feniger
  - Winner: Owen
  - Out: Milo

=== Episode 14: You Are Top Chef Junior! ===
Original airdate::February 2, 2018

- Quickfire Challenge: None
- Elimination Challenge: The chefs were asked to create a three-course meal representing their culinary past, present and future.
- Guest judges: Antonia Lofaso, Tiffany Derry
  - Winner: Owen
  - Runner Up: Rahanna

== Season 2 ==
=== Season 2 Contestants ===
| Name | Age | Hometown |
|---|---|---|
| Carson Peterson | 13 | Ventura, CA |
| Ella Bass | 13 | Berwyn, PA |
| Eric Martínez | 10 | Spring, Texas |
| Kate Daniel | 12 | Houston, TX |
| Londyn Green | 11 | Atlanta, GA |
| Nikki Bidun | 11 | New York, NY |
| Noah Cryns | 11 | Evanston, IL |
| Olivia Acosta | 10 | Long Valley, NJ |
| Rogers Mathews | 13 | Corona, CA |
| Simon Weisserman | 12 | Los Angeles, CA |
| Sophie Frankowski | 13 | New Orleans, LA |
| Tyler Cappelluti | 13 | South River, NJ |

=== Elimination table ===
| Episode # | | 1 | 2 | 3 | 4 | 5 | 6^{4} | 7 | 8 | 9 | 10 | 11 | 12 | 13 | 14 |
|---|---|---|---|---|---|---|---|---|---|---|---|---|---|---|---|
| Quickfire Challenge Winner(s) | | Carson | Kate | Simon^{1} | Nikki | Nikki^{3} | Londyn^{1} Rogers^{1} | N/A | Nikki | Rogers^{1} | Eric^{1} | Londyn^{1} | N/A | Nikki^{1} | N/A |
| Contestant | | Elimination Challenge Results | | | | | | | | | | | | | |
| 1 | Nikki | LOW | IN | HIGH | IN | WIN | LOW | LOW | HIGH | LOW | HIGH | HIGH | WIN | WIN | WINNER |
| 2 | Londyn | LOW | LOW | WIN | LOW | IN | HIGH | HIGH | LOW | LOW | WIN | LOW | HIGH | IN | RUNNER-UP |
| 3 | Rogers | IN | IN | LOW | LOW | IN | SAVED | HIGH | IN | LOW | HIGH | LOW | LOW | OUT | |
| 4 | Noah | IN | LOW | IN | IN | IN | WIN | WIN | LOW | HIGH | SAVED | WIN | OUT | | |
| 5 | Eric | WIN | IN | HIGH | HIGH | IN | SAVED | LOW | IN | WIN | LOW | OUT | | | |
| 6 | Carson | IN | IN | LOW | IN | IN | HIGH | HIGH | WIN | OUT | | | | | |
| 7 | Olivia | HIGH | HIGH | IN | WIN | IN | WIN | LOW | OUT | | | | | | |
| 8 | Simon | HIGH | HIGH | IN | HIGH | IN | LOW | OUT | | | | | | | |
| 9 | Ella | IN | WIN | IN | IN | OUT | | | | | | | | | |
| 10 | Kate | IN | IN^{2} | SAVED | OUT | | | | | | | | | | |
| 11 | Sophie | HIGH | OUT | | | | | | | | | | | | |
| 12 | Tyler | OUT | | | | | | | | | | | | | |

^Note 1: The chef(s) did not receive immunity for winning the Quickfire Challenge.
^Note 2: Kate was sick and did not participate in the Elimination Challenge.
^Note 3: While Nikki was chosen as the overall winner, Carson, Londyn, Olivia, and Rogers also received immunity for placing in the top of the Quickfire Challenge.
^Note 4: Two chefs were eliminated in this episode.

(WINNER) The chef won the season and was crowned "Top Chef Junior".
(RUNNER-UP) The chef was a runner-up for the season.
(WIN) The chef won the Elimination Challenge.
(HIGH) The chef was selected as one of the top entries in the Elimination Challenge but did not win.
(IN) The chef was not selected as one of the top or bottom entries in the Elimination Challenge and was safe.
(LOW) The chef was selected as one of the bottom entries in the Elimination Challenge but was not eliminated.
(SAVED) The chef lost the Elimination Challenge but pulled a save card and continued in the competition.
(OUT) The chef lost the Elimination Challenge and was eliminated.

=== Episodes ===
Episode 0: Making the Cut

Original airdate: August 4, 2018

At boot camp, 22 talented young chefs compete for their chance to make the cast of the second season of the series.

- Day 1: Cut up various food into appropriate pieces. (22 people participated in this round)
- Day 2: Create a dish that is worthy enough to enter the competition (16 people participated in this round)

=== Episode 1: Stirring Up a Celebration ===
Original airdate: September 8, 2018

- Quickfire Challenge: After making it through boot camp, the 12 junior chefs joined Vanessa and Curtis for a small celebration with a large spread of snacks and hors d'oeuvres. Following the celebration, the junior chefs were told that their first quickfire challenge was to create an amuse-bouche in 30 minutes using the leftover ingredients from the party. The winner received immunity from elimination.
  - Winner: Carson
- Elimination Challenge: The junior chefs were challenged to create a signature winning dish for the first Top Chef Junior Food Festival.
- Guest Judge: Richard Blais
  - Winner: Eric
  - Eliminated: Tyler

=== Episode 2: Sunny Side Up ===
Original airdate: September 15, 2018

- Quickfire Challenge: The junior chefs were challenged to create a unique ramen dish in 20 minutes. The winner received immunity from elimination.
  - Winner: Kate
- Elimination Challenge: The judges surprised the junior chefs early in the morning at their rooms with the challenge of creating a delicious brunch dish. The junior chefs had a limited pantry of the ingredients brought to them by the judges and were only able to use the equipment found in their rooms.
  - Winner: Ella
  - Eliminated: Sophie

=== Episode 3: Rolling In Dough ===
Original airdate: September 22, 2018

- Quickfire Challenge: The junior chefs were challenged to create a unique pizza. However, the junior chefs had to play the arcade game Alley Roller in order to get tickets to buy additional ingredients (only simple dough, plain tomato sauce, and mozzarella cheese were available by default). Additionally, tickets could be used to purchase kitchen equipment that the junior chefs could take home with them after the Top Chef Junior competition.
  - Winner: Simon
- Elimination Challenge: The chefs were divided into two teams: the yellow team and the blue team. For their challenge, the junior chefs competed in a series of head-to-head battles where each pair of chefs (one from the yellow team and one from the blue team) had to create a kid-friendly dish highlighting a specific ingredient. In each battle, the panel of judges and kid tasters would vote for their favorite dish; the chef with the most votes scored a point for their team. The team that earned three points first won the overall challenge. The winners of each head-to-head battle are indicated below in bold.
- Yellow Team: Rogers, Carson, Ella, Simon, Kate
- Blue Team: Noah, Nikki, Olivia, Eric, Londyn
  - Round 1 (Olives): Kate vs **Nikki**
  - Round 2 (Broccoli): Rogers vs **Eric**
  - Round 3 (Brussels Sprouts): **Ella** vs Noah
  - Round 4 (Salmon): **Simon** vs Olivia
  - Round 5 (Beets): Carson vs **Londyn**
    - Winning Team: Blue Team
    - Winner: Londyn
    - Saved: Kate

=== Episode 4: Sweet Dreams Come True ===
Original Airdate: September 29, 2018

- Quickfire Challenge: Prior to the competition, the junior chefs were all asked what dream ingredient they would love to work with. For this challenge, those dream ingredients were provided for them and each chef had to create a winning dish highlighting their choice. The winner received immunity from elimination.
  - Winner: Nikki
- Elimination Challenge: The junior chefs were challenged to create a sweet dessert for an event raising awareness for the charity Adopt Together.
- Guest Judge: Candace Nelson
  - Winner: Olivia
  - Eliminated: Kate

=== Episode 5: Field Day! ===
Original Airdate: October 6, 2018

Guest Judge: Reggie Bush

Chefs participate in teams in three rounds

- Red Team: Eric, Ella, Noah
- Yellow Team: Carson, Rogers, Nikki
- Blue Team: Londyn, Olivia, Simon
- Round 1: Obstacle Course: The team must wear foam skis, walk together to three obstacles
  1. Bobbing for Tomatoes, 3 tomatoes per chef per team
  2. Spiralize 6 onions
  3. Fruit Stand Ball Pit, one member at a time per team must find a watermelon, cantaloupe, grapefruit, green apple, lemon, and orange.
  4. Dunk Tank: Throw a football to dunk Curtis Stone in the Dunk Tank.

The first two teams to finish win a significant advantage in the Gameday Quickfire Challenge.

- Winners: Blue and Yellow Teams
- Round 2: Quickfire Challenge: Create the perfect sandwich. Chefs have 25 minutes to cook. This is an individual challenge with the top 5 Chefs receiving immunity in the Elimination Challenge.
  - Blue team received an extra 10 minutes to cook and first choice of the limited pantry ingredients as their advantages
  - Yellow team received an extra 5 minutes to cook and second choice of pantry ingredients.
  - Winners: Rogers, Londyn, Olivia, Carson, and **Nikki** (overall winner, received a Football autographed by Reggie Bush)
- **Round 3: Elimination Challenge: Wings and Sausage Challenge**
  - Top Team: Wings and a Dipping Sauce in 45 minutes
  - Winner: Nikki who received a Top Chef Jr. Football Helmet signed by Reggie Bush
  - Bottom Team: Sausages in 90 minutes
  - Eliminated: Ella

=== Episode 6:Easy as Pie ===
Original Airdate: October 13, 2018

- **Quickfire Challenge** Create your best pie dish while only using 1 hand.

| Team | Team Members |
|---|---|
| Gray | Olivia & Simon |
| Pink | Londyn & Rogers |
| Yellow | Noah & Eric |
| Orange | Carson & Nikki |

- Winner: Londyn and Rogers
- Elimination Challenge:Create a unique dish by having as few waste as possible.

| Team | Team Members |
|---|---|
| Black | Nikki & Simon |
| Red | Londyn & Carson |
| Green | Noah & Olivia |
| Blue | Eric & Rogers |

- Guest Judge:Graham Elliot
  - Winner:Noah & Olivia
  - Saved:Eric & Rogers

=== Episode 7:Restaurant Wars ===
Original Airdate: October 20, 2018

- Elimination Challenge:Create and design 2 restaurants to open in 24 hours.

| Team | Team Members |
|---|---|
| Bleu (Blue) | Simon & Olivia & Nikki & Eric |
| Awakening Restaurant (Orange) | Carson & Noah & Londyn & Rogers |

- For Winning the previous team challenge, Noah and Olivia were chosen as Team captains for this challenge, Noah then selected Londyn as his assistant and Olivia selected Nikki as her assistant, the remaining chefs were drawn from a container of spoons.
- Guest Judge: Joe Flamm
  - Winner:Noah
  - Eliminated:Simon

=== Episode 8:Thriller Bite ===
Original Airdate: October 27, 2018

- Quickfire Challenge:Create a 5 star dish using 3 items from the conveyor belt.
- Winner:Nikki
- Elimination Challenge:Create a gruesome dish highlighting a cut of steak.
- Guest Judge:Richard Blais
  - Winner:Carson
  - Eliminated:Olivia

=== Episode 9:Food Truck Battle ===
Original Airdate: November 3, 2018

- Quickfire Challenge:Create the best Burger and Fries alongside a sauce inspired by Season 1 chef Fuller (without the use of beef).
  - Winner:Rogers
- Elimination Challenge: In less than 24 hours, open 3 food trucks to the public.

| Team Name | Team Members |
|---|---|
| Take Me Tacos (Blue) | Londyn & Rogers |
| Panini Perfection (Yellow) | Noah & Eric |
| Waffles Galore (Orange) | Nikki & Carson |

- Guest Judge: Gail Simmons
  - Winner:Eric
  - Eliminated:Carson

=== Episode 10:Wild Cuisine ===
Original Airdate: November 10, 2018

- Quickfire Challenge:Create the best dish using the mystery box created by their parents.
- Winner:Eric
- Elimination Challenge:Create a dish from the animal you selected from its home region.
- Guest Judge:Jeff Corwin
  - Winner:Londyn
  - Saved:Noah

=== Episode 11:Fantastic Feasts of Fowl ===
Original Airdate: November 17, 2018

- Quickfire Challenge:Chefs are challenged to replicate Head Judge Curtis Stone's dish alongside him.
- Winner:Londyn
- Elimination Challenge:Create a feast featuring a Gainburg and a side, inspired by the wizards of Harry Potter.
- Guest Judge:Tim Love
  - Winner:Noah
  - Eliminated:Eric

=== Episode 12:Food Fight ===
Original Airdate: November 24, 2018

- Elimination Challenge: Four head-to-head 30 minutes (45 minutes in round 4)food fight rounds featuring a spicy pepper.
- Guest Judge:Art Smith
- **Round 1** Opening Round (Jalapeño):Nikki (1 seed) vs Rogers (4 seed)
  - Winner:Nikki
- **Round 2** Opening Round (Serrano): Londyn (2 seed) vs Noah (3 seed)
  - Winner:Londyn
- **Round 3** Championship Challenge (Thai pepper): Nikki (1 seed) vs Londyn (2 seed)
  - Winner:Nikki
- **Round 4** Elimination Challenge (Habanero):Noah (3 seed) vs Rogers (4 seed)
  - Eliminated:Noah

=== Episode 13:Big Catch ===
Original Airdate: November 25, 2018

- Quickfire Challenge:Chefs have 1 hour to escape the Rec Room using clues found in the Rec room, once escaped and into the kitchen, use the remaining time to cook a seashell dish.
  - Winner:Nikki
- Elimination Challenge:Create a fish dish using the fish they caught that morning, to present to a group of people at the fish festival.
- Guest Judge: Lorena Garcia
  - Winner:Nikki
  - Eliminated:Rogers

=== Episode 14:Finale, Meal of a Lifetime ===
Original Airdate: December 1, 2018

- Elimination Challenge:The chefs were asked to create a three-course meal representing dishes inspired by their family, friends and their future journeys.
- Guest Judge:Emeril Lagasse
  - Winner:Nikki
  - Runner Up:Londyn

== Awards and nominations ==
| Year | Award | Category | Nominee | Result | Ref. |
|---|---|---|---|---|---|
| 2019 | NAACP Image Awards | Outstanding Children's Program | Top Chef Junior | Nominated | |
| 2019 | Daytime Emmy Awards | Outstanding Children's or Family Viewing Series | Top Chef Junior | Nominated | |
| 2019 | Daytime Emmy Awards | Outstanding Multiple Camera Editing | Top Chef Junior | Nominated | |
