= The Noise (game show) =

American children's game show

The Noise is an American children's game show that aired on Universal Kids from October 23, 2017, to January 25, 2018. The series is presented by BattleBots ring announcer Faruq Tauheed.

== Gameplay ==
=== Main game ===
Two teams of two kids battle it out in a challenge of skill, speed & sounds. Each show features the teams taking on timed mindless tasks where the goal is to not make so much noise. Teams score points based how quiet they finish the challenge; so the quieter the task, the more points they can score. The progress is being kept track by what's called the "Noise-O-Meter", which determines how loud the sound gets. If it gets too loud and the Noise-O-Meter reaches maximum volume level, the team automatically loses the challenge.

The first round has a challenge worth up to five points; the second is worth up to ten points and the third is worth up to 20, for a maximum total of 35 points for each team. At the end of the three rounds, the losing team receive consolation prizes while the winning team goes on to the Run of the house for $5,000 and prizes but they need be quiet to get them.

=== Run of the house ===
The winning team has three minutes (3:00) to go through the house. The house has five rooms with some noisy obstacles. Each one has a prize attached, with the last one being a mystery. Hidden within those rooms are two pieces of a picture puzzle of the show's logo. Their job is to find those pieces without making too much noise. Doing so won the prize attached to the room in any room, if at any time the winning team makes too much noise, the room & prizes are both forfeited plus the $5,000 is forfeited. Either way, the team moves on to the next room. They can pass on a room and come back to it at anytime if there's time left on the clock. If the winning team can get past all five rooms without making any of the loudest sounds and before time runs out, they win $5,000 and all five prizes. Regardless of the outcome, the winning team will keep any prizes won in that round.

- Living Room – the players have to climb up a mountain of beanbag chairs, a floor of party paper, crawl through a mountain of boxes, remove a fireplace set, traverse a floor of dog toys, remove a coin collection, or take out as much firewood to acquire the pieces.
- Bedroom – the players must remove game pieces, dig through a toy chest, or carefully remove picture frames or plastic coat hangers to get the pieces.
- Kitchen – the players will need to remove the pots and pans or dishes in the kitchen, dig through the groceries, remove the dirty dishes, copper pipes, carefully remove the pieces from jars of candy, or by way of sifting through the pasta to get the pieces.
- Bathroom – the players must carefully arrange the metal cans, traverse a shower curtain, get the pieces by pulling them out of boxes full of glass marbles, buckets of perfume, hair curlers, or seashells.
- Attic – the players will try to reach for the pieces by traversing the bubble wrap floor, maneuver the pieces through a chandelier, going through the bicycles and chains, or dig through the Christmas ornaments, mannequin parts, or flower pots.

== Celebrity shows ==
On celebrity shows, losing teams leave with $2,500 and completing the bonus round wins $10,000, which instead of prizes-each room is worth a random dollar amount. All money won goes to the team's favorite charities.

== International Versions ==
A short-lived Philippines version under the name Quiet Please!: Bawal ang Maingay (Quest Please!: No Noise is Allowed) hosted by Richard Gomez & K Brosas aired on TV5 from August 10, 2014 until January 11, 2015.

A Spanish-language version under the name Cero Ruido (Zero Noise) hosted by Tania Rincón airs on Canal 5 in Mexico and Univision in the U.S. since 2024.
