= Astroblast! =

Children's animated television series

- Genre: Edutainment; Comedy; Preschool; Science fiction
- Created by: Bob Kolar
- Based on: Astroblast! by Bob Kolar
- Directed by: Dan Flynn
- Composer: Eggplant LF (Note: A team of music composers consisting of Steve D'Angelo and Terry Tompkins)
- Country of origin: United States
- Original language: English
- No. of seasons: 2
- No. of episodes: 52

Production
- Executive producer: Deborah Forte
- Producers: David Trexler (Note: Supervising producer.); Emily Brown; Jessica Wollman; Jef Kaminsky
- Running time: 11 minutes
- Production companies: Scholastic Entertainment (Note: Animation outsourced to Top Draw Animation.); Soup2Nuts

Original release
- Network: Sprout
- Release: July 12, 2014 – February 7, 2015

Astroblast! is an American animated children's science fiction television series created by Bob Kolar for Sprout. The series follows Comet, an extroverted dog, Sputnik, an adventurous and loving pig, Halley, a smoothie-delivering rabbit, Radar, a bouncy monkey, and Jet, a mute alligator, who live together with an octopus named Sal in the Astroblast Space Station to the fictional smoothie café known as the Frosty Star. It is based on the book series of the same name by author and illustrator Bob Kolar.

The series was co-produced by Scholastic Entertainment and Soup2Nuts and premiered on July 12, 2014. The series also started airing on NBC Kids, a Saturday morning programming block on NBC, in October 2014. This was the final series produced by Soup2Nuts before the company closed on March 27, 2015.

An early promo for the series featured a variation of the theme music from The A-Team.

== Premise ==
The series follows the adventures of a group of high-spirited and fun-loving animals, Comet, Halley, Sputnik, Radar, and Jet. They live with their alien octopus friend in the Astroblast Space Station, which also houses a large library and a smoothie café called the Frosty Star.

== Cast ==
- Comet (voiced by Vinnie Penna) is an easily excitable, easygoing, optimistic and determined red dog. Penna also voices Morg, Bloodoo, and Flash, and provides additional voices.
- Halley (voiced by Gigi Abraham) is a pink rabbit who likes smoothies and makes high-speed deliveries. Abraham also voices Zelda, Sal's GamGam, Glippi, Bippity-Bops and provides additional voices.
- Sputnik (voiced by Veronica Taylor) is a pig who has a tendency to get overly passionate about things. Taylor also voices Carly Cosmos, Bippity-Bops, and Laney, and provides additional voices.
- Radar (voiced by Joe Gaudet) is a lazy and feisty but well-meaning and practical brown monkey who loves to bounce. Gaudet also voices Bob and Cosmo Carson, and provides additional voices.
- Jet is a stoic green alligator who has a quiet disposition. He communicates via gestures and sign language.
- Sal (voiced by John Taylor) is a purple three-eyed octopus-like alien who founded the Frosty Star. He is level-headed and typically gives advice to the other characters on how to solve their problems. Taylor also voices Doobloo and provides additional voices.

The voice director of the series is Susan Blu.

== Episodes ==
Season	Episodes	Originally released	
Season	Episodes	First released	Last released
1	26	July 12, 2014	August 12, 2014
2	26	October 19, 2014	February 7, 2015

=== Season 1 (2014) ===
No. overall	No. in season	Title	Written by	Original release date	Prod. code
1	1	"Spic 'n Span"	Jack Ferraiolo	July 21, 2014	101
2	2	"Smoothie Operator"	Susan Kim	July 14, 2014	102
3	3	"Take Off!"	Susan Kim	July 15, 2014	103
4	4	"Oh, Brother..."	Jack Ferraiolo	July 12, 2014	104
5	5	"Bend It Like Radar"	Jill Cozza-Turner	July 16, 2014	105
6	6	"Lost and Found"	Ed Valentine	July 17, 2014	106
7	7	"I'll Save You!"	Frederick Stroppel	July 18, 2014	107
8	8	"Growin' Crazy"	Jack Ferraiolo, Susan Kim & Allan Neuwirth	July 14, 2014	108
9	9	"Twice the Talent"	Jonathan Greenberg	July 15, 2014	109
10	10	"Building the Perfect Present"	Jen Klein	July 12, 2014	110
11	11	"Glippi's Visit"	Ed Valentine	July 15, 2014	111
12	12	"Don't Touch!"	Adam Rudman	July 17, 2014	112
13	13	"Are You My Piffin?"	Melinda LaRose	July 18, 2014	113
14	14	"Halley's Wannabe"	Jill Cozza-Turner	July 19, 2014	114
15	15	"Sputnik the Spoiler"	Susan Kim	July 20, 2014	115
16	16	"Don't Fear the Surfboard"	Frederick Stroppel	July 26, 2014	116
17	17	"Billy Starrider"	Kacey Arnold	July 21, 2014	117
18	18	"Sore Loser"	Denise Brossman	July 22, 2014	118
19	19	"Halley Goes Solo"	Elizabeth Keyishian	July 23, 2014	119
20	20	"Z-Max Mania"	Rogelio Martinez	July 12, 2014	120
21	21	"What a Mess!"	Jen Klein	July 13, 2014	121
22	22	"Beck and Call"	Pamela Hickey & Dennys McCoy	July 13, 2014	122
23	23	"Sputnik Takes Charge"	Jonathan Greenberg	July 22, 2014	123
24	24	"The Clean Machine"	Susan Kim	July 23, 2014	124
25	25	"Comet's Gift"	Ed Valentine	July 24, 2014	125
26	26	"A Star Is Born"	Jill Cozza-Turner	August 12, 2014	126

=== Season 2 (2014–15) ===
No. overall	No. in season	Title	Written by	Original release date	Prod. code
27	1	"A Bird in the Hand"	Susan Kim	June 22, 2015	127
28	2	"How Do You Get to Carnegie Nebula?"	Melinda LaRose	TBA	128
29	3	"Who Let the Stuffie Out?"	Jonathan Greenberg	TBA	129
30	4	"Lights Out"	Kacey Arnold	October 19, 2014	130
31	5	"Shape Up!"	Jack Ferraiolo	TBA	131
32	6	"Surfin' Space Safari"	Susan Kim	October 20, 2014	132
33	7	"I Love a Parade...Sometimes"	Rogelio Martinez	November 8, 2015 or May 9, 2015 or earlier	133
34	8	"Radar Sleeps Over"	Denise Brossman	October 29, 2014	134
35	9	"Stop Booging Me!"	Jill Cozza-Turner	November 15, 2015 or May 16, 2015 or earlier	135
36	10	"Just Peachy"	Liz Keyishian	February 9, 2015 or May 16, 2015 or November 15, 2015	136
37	11	"Hole in One"	Jack Ferraiolo & Susan Kim	February 10, 2015	137
38	12	"Treasure Hunt"	Jonathan Greenberg	February 11, 2015	138
39	13	"Something Borrowed, Someone Blue"	Susan Kim	January 19, 2015	139
40	14	"Be Mine"	Ed Valentine	February 14, 2015	140
41	15	"GamGam Knows Best aka Gam Gam Knows Best"	Kacey Arnold	January 19, 2015 or September 9, 2015	141
When the crew meet Sal's GamGam, they're shocked at how fragile she seems.
42	16	"Three's a Crowd"	Denise Brossman	January 21, 2015	142
43	17	"Who's Afraid of the Big Bad Alligator? aka Big Bad Alligator"	Jill Cozza-Turner	January 23, 2015 or June 6, 2015 or October 1, 2015	143
A family of new customers are scared of Jet.
44	18	"Sing Along to the Bouncing Monkey"	Susan Kim	February 2, 2015 or June 6, 2015	144
45	19	"I Feel Fine!"	Jonathan Greenberg	January 26, 2015	145
46	20	"Shoes Blues"	Ed Valentine	February 13, 2015	146
47	21	"Radar for a Day"	Susan Kim	January 28, 2015 or November 3, 2015	147
Halley thinks Radar is taking his time fixing something for her.
48	22	"A Gift From Halley"	Liz Keyishian	January 30, 2015 or November 3, 2015	148
Halley gives the crew a gift–but they can't figure out what it is.
49	23	"Best Guests"	Susan Kim	February 2, 2015 or November 3, 2015	149
The crew can't agree on how to show their customers they care.
50	24	"Puzzle Hunt"	Ed Valentine	February 4, 2015	150
51	25	"Bop 'Til You Drop" "Bop Til You Drop"	Jonathan Greenberg	February 6, 2015 or June 27, 2015	151
52	26	"Kapowsers!"	Susan Kim	February 7, 2015 or June 27, 2015	152

== International broadcast ==
The series was dubbed into different languages and has aired in other countries internationally. Finnish network Yle TV2 began broadcasting the series in November 2016, during the "Pikku Kakkonen" programming block. In Ireland, it aired on TG4, in Spain, it aired on Clan and RTVE Play, in Thailand, it aired on True Spark, in the United Arab Emirates, it aired on DKids, and in Canada, it aired on Knowledge Network.

The series was previously available on Hulu before 2019. In 2021, the FilmRise multimedia platform picked up the show for distribution, and it was available on The Roku Channel, Pluto TV and Tubi TV; as of March 2025, it is also available to watch on Tubi and YouTube.
