= Pic Me =

Irish children's television show

- Genre: Preschool; Interactivity; Children's animation
- Voices of: Alan Stanford; Flo McSweeney
- Narrated by: Alan Stanford
- Country of origin: Ireland
- Original language: English
- No. of episodes: 104

Production
- Running time: 5 minutes
- Production company: JAM Media

Original release
- Network: RTÉ
- Release: 1 August 2005 – 23 August 2012

Pic Me (or PICME) is an Irish interactive preschool children's animated television series that premiered on 1 August 2005 on RTÉ, later airing on TG4 and Nick Jr. channels throughout Europe. HIT Entertainment held worldwide distribution rights. Since mid-2008, episodes of Pic Me have aired in the United States on Animania HD and Sprout. Also, in the United States, a Spanish-dubbed version airs on V-Me.

== Format ==
Episodes of Pic Me last for approximately five to ten minutes. Pic Me is an innovative show in that it allows its viewers to star in each episode. Every episode has one viewer's photograph superimposed on a cartoon child's body. These characters then roam around the story, walking, running, jumping, and physically interacting with the main cartoon characters. The viewer characters neither speak, nor do the characters refer to them by each of their names. Instead, they are referred to as "Little Boy" (if the avatar is male) or "Little Girl" (if the avatar is female) as is relevant.

Since the start of 2005, many new episodes of Pic Me have involved two viewers, instead of just one. These "best friends" type episodes have the main star viewer holding, or looking at, a picture of their real-life "best friend". Another episode starring the "best friend" is shown at a later date, with the situation regarding the pictures mirrored.

== Characters ==
The 6 main characters in Pic Me include:

- Juno – an orange male anthropomorphic african lion with a nasal voice. He is generally insecure and often seen to be frightened of confrontation. He is very forgetful, but loves having fun with his friends.
- Gerty – a yellow female anthropomorphic reticulated giraffe. She is quite intelligent and loves to cook, but she is very fussy and likes to do things to be clean.
- Banjo – a purple male anthropomorphic spider monkey.
- Umi – a red female anthropomorphic scarlet macaw. She is clever and fun-loving, but she can have a brash attitude towards other characters, although not the "Little Boy" or "Little Girl". She is very talkative, but friendly. She enjoys carrying her friends into the air to "look at the sky". Presumably they enjoy this.
- Clarence – a green male anthropomorphic Nile crocodile with an inferiority complex. He is so proud of his ability to swim, but otherwise he can get very nervous around other characters.
- Neville – a blue male anthropomorphic African bush elephant (the mistake is the absence of tusks). He is the most intelligent character and is the character who gives everyone else good advice. They all ask him some questions and – after screwing up his eyes – he will eventually give the right answer. He is a moral character and teaches the others right from wrong.

== DVD releases ==
A DVD release of the series titled: "Pic Me: You're the Star!" was released by HIT Entertainment in the United Kingdom on 23 October 2006. It contained twelve episodes of the show in its original widescreen format, alongside a bonus CD-ROM containing Microsoft Windows software to create your own Pic Me cartoons. A similar DVD - titled "Pic Me: Personalised Early Learning", was released in Ireland by RTÉ, however, the episodes featured were shown in a cropped fullscreen ratio.

The episode "Journey into Space" was included as a bonus episode on several HIT Entertainment DVDs in the United Kingdom in January 2007, such as "Incredibubble Children's Favourites", Angelina Ballerina - Angelina Sets Sail, and Fireman Sam on Stage.

== Video Games ==
The app Pic Me Moviebook is an interactive storybook and animated movie app designed for preschoolers, allowing them to star in their own personalized adventures, based on the Irish TV Series, PIC ME. While it doesn't focus on traditional gaming, it incorporates game-like elements to enhance engagement, literacy, education, learning, numeracy, problem-solving and social-emotional learning. It is an iPad app that has been released for somewhat early 2013 and it got discontinued in the early 2016.

== Awards ==
- Best digital storytelling category (2005 Digital Media Awards)
- Best Youth Programme (2005 Irish Film and Television Awards)
