= Noodle and Doodle =

- Created by: John McCoy
- Directed by: Kristofer Updike
- Presented by: Sean Roach
- Voices of: Sean Roach; Bianca Goode; Stacy Nesbit; Lucien Dodge; Andrea Caron; Pete Markham; Alison Brie; Kevin Smith; Tim Whitnall
- Country of origin: United States
- Original language: English
- No. of seasons: 2
- No. of episodes: 26 (52 segments)

Production
- Producer: Kristofer Updike
- Production companies: Enthusiastic Productions (2010); Grooters Productions (2010–2011); Sprout Original

Original release
- Network: Sprout; NBC Kids
- Release: September 25, 2010 – December 20, 2011

Noodle and Doodle is an American live action children's television series, which premiered on September 25, 2010, and ended on December 20, 2011. The series was created by John McCoy, produced and directed by Kristopher Updike. The series was the first long form television series on Sprout (Universal Kids).

== Production ==
The show began production in 2010. It was originally launched by Enthusiastic Productions. The series was produced by Kristofer Updike and (from 2010 to 2011) Grooters Productions. The show was filmed in Holland, Michigan at Hope College, and Philadelphia, PA with some scenes filmed around West Michigan and Philadelphia.

== Format ==
The show began with a double-decker bus driving around West Michigan and Southeastern Pennsylvania, driven by Sean Roach (former host of Sprout's morning block The Sunny Side-Up Show). Sean then visited a family to get ideas for a recipe and a craft. Doodle then drew out a "blueprint" for what Sean could make. He taught the viewing audience how to make healthy recipes and crafts step-by-step with help from his friend Noodle McNoodle.

There was also an animated segment called "Doggity's", where Sean's pet beagle, Doggity, also makes a recipe with his other dog friends in a restaurant in Doggity's imagination.

Sometimes, Sean and the children would recycle an object from the recipe to use for a craft.

== Characters ==
- Sean (portrayed by Sean Roach) is the host of the show, driver of the bus, and the person who makes the recipes and crafts.
- Noodle McNoodle (performed by Bianca Goode in Season 1, Stacy Nesbit in Season 2) is a lovable puppet of indeterminate species who assists Sean on making and cooking recipes and likes to use her "noodle". In specific episodes, Noodle can dress up in different costumes to match the theme of the episode.
- Doodle is a virtual bus-shaped computer who creates the recipe and craft ideas.
- Doggity is Sean's downstairs pet beagle who lives on the bus in the live-action segment and becomes animated as a chef in a restaurant within his imagination called "Doggity's". At the end of every cartoon short, he would say "Now that's doggone good!" and would wink.
- Deedeldee is a poodle who is seen in the "Doggity's" segments working as a waitress. She is the one who tells Doggity who has just ordered something at the restaurant.
- Mack is a bulldog who is seen in the "Doggity's" segments working as a cook. When Mack tries to make a dish for the customers that just ordered, he would accidentally make a mess and he would quote "I'll get the mop again." After Doggity makes the dish for the specific customers, Mack would quote "It'll never work!" as Deedeldee tells him that he keeps saying it. In the "Moms" episode, Mack quoted "It might just work!" as Deedeldee remarks "Wow, Mack! You never say that!"
- Tony is a pug with a sea captain motive who is seen in the "Doggity's" segments working as a cook. When it comes to the customers' recent orders, Tony would recap about an event in his life that revolves around that until Deedeldee would correct him. Tony would then make a comment to follow up on Deedeldee's comment. After Doggity completes the dish for the specific customers, Tony would quote "Order Up.".

== Episodes ==
The following is a list of episodes that aired on NBC Kids and Telemundo. The original air dates for the then-Sprout episodes are unknown.

=== Series overview ===
Season	Episodes	Originally released	
Season	Episodes	First released	Last released
1	13	September 25, 2010	November 20, 2010
2	13	November 24, 2011	December 20, 2011

=== Season 1 (2010) ===
No. overall	No. in season	Title	Original release date
1	1	"Birds In My Backyard / Our Family Apple Tree"	September 25, 2010
Recipes: Birdseed mix, Apple-blueberry crumbles Crafts: Milk carton birdhouses, Family apple trees
2	2	"Family Vacation / Going Camping"	September 26, 2010
Recipes: Cheesy baked pasta shells, Popcorn trail mix Crafts: Everlasting sandcastle, Nature pictures
3	3	"Grandpa's Visit / A Trip To The Lake"	October 2, 2010
Recipes: Red pepper wheelbarrows, Frittata boats Crafts: Bird planters, Milk carton boats
4	4	"Bake Sale / I Love To Build!"	October 3, 2010
Recipes: Butterfly cupcakes, "Tower of Fries"; Crafts: Piggy banks, Digger costume
5	5	"Woof Woof / It's A Band!"	October 9, 2010
Recipes: Dog bone cookies, "Chicken Lickin' Drumsticks"; Crafts: Doghouses, Shaker drums
6	6	"A Puppet Show / Dinner With Grandma"	October 10, 2010
Recipes: Date cookies, Porcupine meatballs Crafts: Paper bag puppets, Rice placemats
7	7	"A Friend At The Hospital / Our New Baby"	October 16, 2010
Recipes: Fruit flowers, Baby angel food cakes Crafts: Cupcake paper flowers, Big sister badges
8	8	"A Pirate Party / Road Trip"	October 17, 2010
Recipes: Golden fish nuggets, pinwheel treats Crafts: Pirate telescopes, Egg carton bingo
9	9	"Dance Lessons / Soccer Time"	October 23, 2010
Recipes: Berry twirls, "Get-Up-And-Go Bars"; Crafts: Dancing butterfly wands, Soccer practice cones
10	10	"It's A Hot, Hot Day / Soap bubbles"	October 30, 2010
Recipes: Watermelon ice pops, "Sunset Smoothies"; Crafts: Ice cube paintings, Soap bubble blowing wands
11	11	"We Love Mom / Using Our Senses"	November 6, 2010
Recipes: "Noodle & Doodle Meatloaf Bus", "Giant Party Sundae"; Crafts: Pasta necklaces, Scratch-N-Sniff Birthday Greeting Cards
12	12	"A Halloween Party / Happy Birthday, Brother!"	November 13, 2010
Recipes: "Wiggly Worms in Delicious Dirt", "Solar System pizza" Crafts: Sparkly spider webs, Planet decorations
13	13	"Cheer Up / A Day At The Lighthouse"	November 20, 2010
Recipes: "Orange Smiles", Red clay Crafts: Dreamcatchers, Clay lighthouses

=== Season 2 (2011) ===
No. overall	No. in season	Title	Original release date
14	1	"Down On The Farm/Sweet Memories"	December 20, 2011
Recipes: Blueberry Sprinkle Smoothies, Sweet Memories Cake; Crafts: Magic Milk Pictures, Cake Toppers
15	2	"The Babysitter's Here/Trains"	December 5, 2011
Recipes: Apricot Slam Dunkers, Tasty Passenger Treats; Crafts: Mini Basketball Games, Lunchbox Trains
16	3	"Zoorific/Mom's New Job"	December 7, 2011
Recipes: Cheesy Beany Animal Tostadas, Laptop Quesadillas; Crafts: Giraffe Hats, Pen & Pencil Holders
17	4	"A Chinese New Year/Wrapping Presents"	November 30, 2011
Recipes: Lucky Dragon Dumplings, Oatmeal Cookie Recipe In A Jar; Crafts: Paper Dragons, Birthday Cake Gift Box
18	5	"Story Time/A Family Bike Ride"	December 6, 2011
Recipes: Story Time Book Bites, Bicycle Icicle Tea; Crafts: Storytime Backpacks, Bike Licence Plates & Bike Tassels
19	6	"Dino Stomp/It's Movie Time"	December 8, 2011
Recipes: Dinosaur Eggs In A Nest, Coconut Safari Snack Mix; Crafts: Stomping Dino Feet, Safari Snack Cones
20	7	"Our Teddy Bear Picnic/Come To Our Tea Party"	December 9, 2011
Recipes: Teddy Bear Bread, Strawberry Cream Pancakes; Crafts: Teddy Bear Picnic Basket, Salt Dough Tea Set
21	8	"Let's Fly A Kite/Art-Tastic"	November 25, 2011
Recipes: Cheesy Tuna Kite Toasties, Recycled Crayons; Crafts: Nature Kites, Leaf Rub Wreaths
22	9	"Magic Time/Our New Boots"	November 28, 2011
Recipes: Pretzel Wands With Disappearing Dip & Spellbinding Seeds, Stuffed Potato Snow Boots; Crafts: Rabbit-In-The-Hat Tricks, Snow Scene Dioramas
23	10	"Meow Meow/Kings & Queens"	November 24, 2011
Recipes: Kitty Cat Cookies, Jelly Jewels; Crafts: Mouse On A Stick Toys, Jeweled Crowns
24	11	"Deck The Scarecrow/We Love Mermaids"	December 19, 2011
Recipes: Vegetable Garden Muffins, Under The Sea Cookie Pops; Crafts: Deck-Sized Scarecrows, Mermaid Tails
25	12	"Big Sister's Birthday/Skate-O-Rama"	November 27, 2011
Recipes: Banana Ice Cream Flowers, Hot Chocolate With Whipped Cream; Crafts: Sock Flower Bouquet, Ice Skate Invitations
26	13	"A Day At The Aquarium/A Family Valentine's Day"	November 29, 2011
Recipes: Red Pepper Octopus & Cheese Dip, Cheesy Valentine's Macaroni; Crafts: Sun-Catching Fish Mobile, Pop-Up Valentine's Day Greeting Cards

== Broadcast ==
The series aired on Sprout in the United States, and TVOKids and Knowledge Kids in Canada.
