= The Chica Show =

American children's television series (2012–2015)

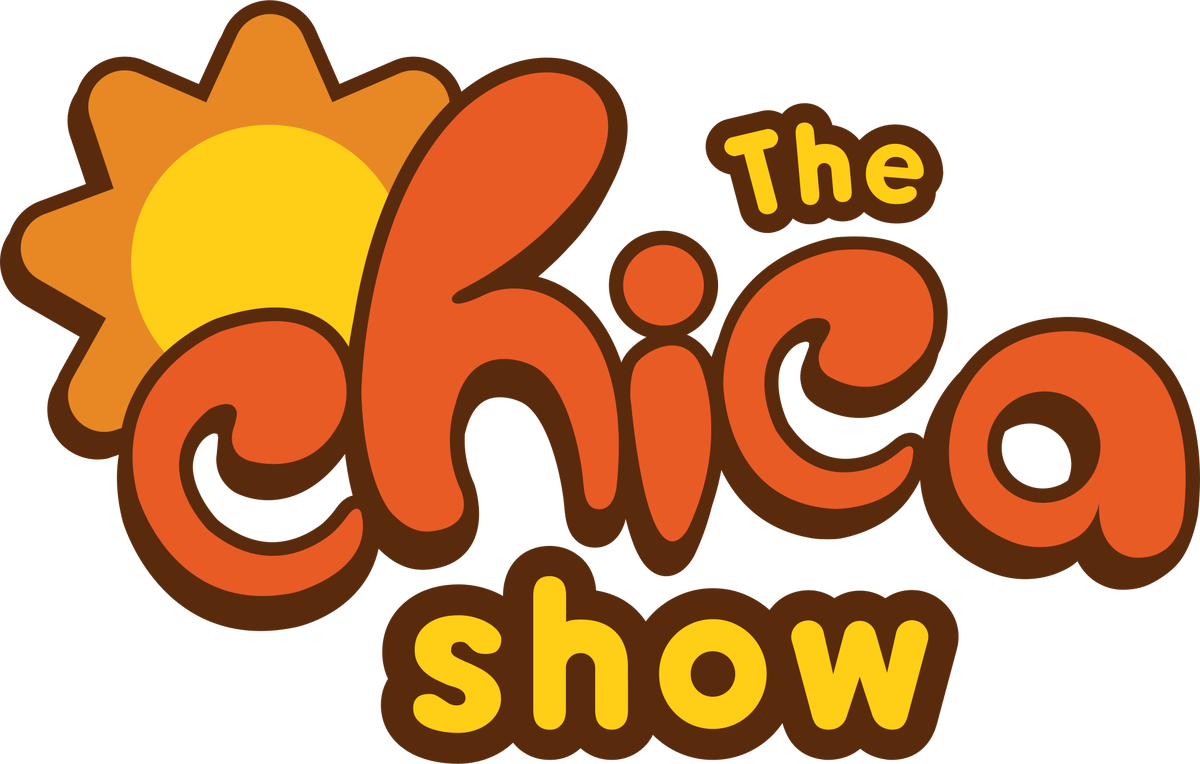
- Also known as: Chica
- Presented by: Kelly Vrooman
- Starring: Forrest Harding; Mario Lopez; John Taylor; Christopher Brasfield
- Opening theme: "The Chica Show"
- Ending theme: "The Chica Show" (instrumental)
- Composer: Tim Burns
- Country of origin: United States
- Original language: English
- No. of seasons: 2
- No. of episodes: 26 (51 segments)

Production
- Running time: 22 minutes
- Production company: Sprout Originals

Original release
- Network: Sprout
- Release: November 24, 2012 – May 10, 2015

Related
- The Sunny Side Up Show

The Chica Show is an American live-action/animated children's television series based on the puppetry segments of The Sunny Side Up Show on Sprout, which features the chicken puppet character Chica in full episodic and animated adventures rather than the traditional continuity of The Sunny Side Up Show. The program premiered on November 24, 2012, with a preview episode airing on October 31, 2012. The program began to air as part of the NBC Kids block on Comcast/NBCUniversal's sister network NBC in February 2013, and is fully compliant with E/I regulations. A second season started on July 29, 2013, and ended in 2015.

== Characters ==
- Kelly (Kelly Vrooman) is the shopkeeper of the Costume Coop, a store selling many different costumes.
- Chica C (squeaks provided by Forrest Harding) is a chicken puppet and Mr. and Mrs. C's daughter. Chica often causes problems in the live-action segments, only for Kelly to teach her a lesson and the lesson to be demonstrated in the cartoon segment. Chica's name is roughly Spanish for "girl" or the feminine version of "small".
- Bunji (voiced by John Taylor) is a rabbit who likes carrots. He becomes anthropomorphic in the cartoon segments.
- Stitches (voiced by Mario Lopez) is a boy who seems to be a rag doll, and is a display in the Coop's window. He comes to life in the cartoon segments.
- Mr. C (John Kennedy) is a rooster who is Chica's father.
- Mrs. C (Jennifer Barnhart) is a hen who is Chica's mother. She has starred in many plays at the Coop.
- Jett (Christopher Brasfield) is a deliveryman who was so fast as the jet plane.

== Format ==
In every episode, Kelly, Chica, Mr. C and Mrs. C tend to what the customer at the Costume Coop that episode needs. Things often go wrong in this part due to Chica, so Kelly tries to teach Chica the lesson of the episode. Then, the cuckoo clock (which is shaped like Mr. C) goes off and Kelly tells Chica that the coop is closing, but they decided to have more fun. Afterward, Mr. and Mrs. C lock up the Coop while singing a song. After, two eggs with legs hop out of the cuckoo clock and Kelly, Chica, Stitches, and Bunji magically transform into cartoon characters. Kelly then says "Time to dress up and play!" and the cartoon segment is shown, demonstrating the lesson that Chica learned. After the cartoon, Chica and Kelly immediately pack up and leave the Coop.

== Episodes ==
1. "Captain Chica Redcomb" / "The Amazing Chicadini" (February 7, 2013): Chica loses a pirate party hat. / Chica learns to believe in herself while pretending to be a magician.
2. "Chica Rocks" / "Chica Twinkle Toes" (February 16, 2013): Chica learns to keep a beat in her imaginary rock band. / Ballerina Chica learns the importance of practicing.
3. "Cowgirls and Cowchicken" / "Icky, Sticky, Chicky" (February 23, 2013): Chica learns about following rules / Chica creates chaos in the coop when she doesn't want to clean up after making an icky, sticky masterpiece.
4. "Chica to the Rescue" / "Chica and the Vikings" (March 2, 2013): Fire Chief Chica learns how to be a hero. / Chica learns to be polite.
5. "Commander Chica Lifts Off" / "Chica the Artist" (March 9, 2013): Chica gets jittery during her imaginary space mission. / Chica discovers that everyone has their own special touch when it comes to creating art.
6. "Chica Plays the Egg Games" / "Super Chica" (March 16, 2013): Chica learns to be a good sport. / Chica learns the importance of teamwork.
7. "Special Delivery Chica" / "Chica's Big Comb Circus" (March 23, 2013): The cuckoo clock in the Coop breaks and makes other animal noises. / Chica acts bossy while being the ringmaster of a circus.
8. "Reporting for WCLUCK" / "Doctor Chica" (March 30, 2013): Chica pretends to be a news reporter. / Chica, a fairy doctor, tries to cure Fairy Stitches of his "Wilted Wing."
9. "Chica Has the Chirples" / "Chica's Jug Band Jamboree" (April 6, 2013): Chica loses her voice. / No one can play in the jug band jamboree because Chica will not share any of the instruments.
10. "Chica Climbs a Mountain" / "Snow Princess Chica" (April 13, 2013): A cold wind forces Chica to cancel her luau plans, so see sets off on an icy adventure. / Chica becomes frustrated when she can't find a crown in the Coop.
11. "Vroom, Vroom Chica" / "Chica the Bock-a-Doodle Builder" (April 20, 2013): Chica and her friends race off on an adventure. / Chica learns about planning buildings.
12. "Farmer Chica" / "Bock-a-Doodle-Doo, I Love You" (April 27, 2013): Chica gorges on junk food. / Chica thinks that her parents don't love her anymore after she causes trouble.
13. "Chica's Fashion Squeak" / "Cheerleading Chica" (January 25, 2014): Chica creates a costume for her dad. / Chica plays hide-and-squeak.
14. "Can Chica Play Too?" / "Detective Chica" (February 8, 2014): Kelly's cousin Sally visits. / Chica's baby chick goes missing.
15. "Chica's Checklist" / "Tippy Top Chica" (March 15, 2014): Things go topsy-turvy in the coop when Chica neglects her chores to play with Jett's new periscope. / Chica thinks she's too small to do anything.
16. "Chica's Tasty Treat" / "Chica's Sense-sational Day" (March 22, 2014): Chica wins a cooking competition by using an ingredient that no one else wants to try. / Chica discovers there are other ways to see things when a blind customer enters the coop.
17. "Techno-Chica" / "Chica's Comedy Of Errors" (March 29, 2014): Chica uses Kelly's smartphone without asking. / Chica misinterprets some important information, and things get very confusing, with a trip to Shakespearean times, Chica learns that it's good to ask questions when things sound strange.
18. "Bock-a-Doodle-Loo Chica" / "Tweet Dreams Chica" (May 3, 2014): Chica wants to show her mom and dad how much she loves them. / Chica stays up late and realizes that she doesn't have enough energy to have fun.
19. "Lights! Camera! Chica!" / "Star Struck Chica" (May 17, 2014): Chica shoots a television commercial for The Costume Coop. / Chica meets her favorite celebrity and learns about personal space.
20. "All of a Kind Chica" / "Chica's Beach Party" (May 31, 2014): The coop is setting up a surprise birthday party for Jett. / Chica forgets to keep an eye out for the delivery guy.
21. "Chicasaurus Rex" / "Safari Chica" (June 28, 2014): Stomping like a dinosaur, Chica accidentally ruins Dad's model city. / The search for a costume makes Chica hungry; a trip to a Savannah watering hole.
22. "Chica Fancy Fish" / "Chica's Halloween Adventure" (November 1, 2014): Keeping the environment under the sea clean.
23. "Dance of the Sugar Cluck Chica" (December 20, 2014): Chica wants to give her parents a snow globe for Christmas.
24. "Little Red Riding Chica" / "Blue Ribbon Chica" (March 28, 2015): It's Mrs. C's big book signing day. / Chica does not tell Mrs. C about the rip in her mother's costume.
25. "Chica Bugs Out" / "Chica's Parade" (May 2, 2015): Chica discovers that even creepy crawly critters are really cool.
26. "Chica's Royal Choice" / "All Seasons Chica" (May 10, 2015): Chica believes that Jett doesn't like her anymore when he chooses a costume Kelly made for him over one made by Chica.
