= Universal Kids =

Defunct American children's television channel

- Final logo used from April 12, 2019 to March 6, 2025.
- Country: United States
- Broadcast area: Nationwide
- Headquarters: Comcast Building, Rockefeller Center, New York City

Programming
- Languages: English; Spanish (via SAP audio track)
- Picture format: 1080i HDTV (downscaled to letterboxed 480i for the SDTV feed)

Ownership
- Owner: PBS (2005–13); Sesame Workshop (2005–12); HIT Entertainment (2005–12); Apax Partners (2005–12); Comcast (through NBCUniversal)
- Parent: NBCUniversal Media Group
- Sister channels: List: CNBC; E!; MSNBC; NBC; Bravo; Oxygen; USA Network; Syfy; Telemundo

History
- Launched: September 26, 2005; 21 years ago
- Replaced: PBS Kids (original 1999 channel)
- Closed: March 6, 2025; 20 months ago
- Replaced by: Peacock
- Former names: PBS Kids Sprout (2005–13); Sprout (2013–17)

Links
- Website: www.universalkids.com (Archive link)

Universal Kids (formerly known as PBS Kids Sprout from 2005 until 2013 and Sprout from 2013 until 2017) was an American children's television channel owned by the NBCUniversal Media Group division of NBCUniversal, a subsidiary of Comcast.

The channel launched on September 26, 2005, as PBS Kids Sprout, a preschool-oriented spin-off of PBS Kids established as a joint venture among PBS, Comcast (through NBCUniversal), Sesame Workshop, and HIT Entertainment. It replaced PBS's 24-hour PBS Kids Channel, which originally operated between 1999 and 2005 before being revived in 2017. After Comcast's acquisition of NBCUniversal in 2011, the company began to acquire the remaining owners' shares in the network. Comcast (through NBCUniversal) became the sole owner of PBS Kids Sprout in 2013, after which the network was renamed Sprout. Under NBCUniversal ownership, the network increased its investments into original programming.

In 2017, the network relaunched as Universal Kids, adding an evening and prime time lineup targeting a wider youth audience, including DreamWorks Animation content, non-scripted programming (including game shows and youth spin-offs of NBCUniversal reality series such as American Ninja Warrior and Top Chef), and acquired teen dramas. The Sprout brand was retained for the network's daytime lineup of preschool programming until January 2018.

Amid industry-wide declines in the viewership of children's cable channels, Universal Kids stopped developing new original programming in 2019, and the channel largely relied on acquisitions and DreamWorks Animation library content therefore, its remaining first-run programming moved to NBCUniversal's streaming service Peacock, the channel closed down on March 6, 2025 and the channel's website now just redirects to that of Universal Kids Resort's website.

== History ==
=== As PBS Kids Sprout and Sprout (2005–2017) ===
==== Development and launch ====
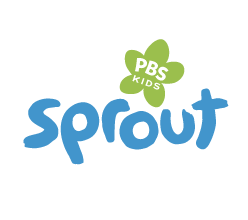
Former logo used as PBS Kids Sprout from September 26, 2005 to November 30, 2013.

Following the failure of PBS's first 24-hour PBS Kids Channel launched in 1999, on October 20, 2004, PBS announced that it had entered into a partnership with cable provider Comcast and production companies HIT Entertainment and Sesame Workshop to launch a 24-hour cable network aimed at preschool children. Created to “strengthen the competitive positions” of all of the parties, PBS Vice-President of digital ventures Deron Triff noted that the content would be "consistent with PBS's values" and "meet certain curricular objectives and have been tested for educational efficacy." On April 4, 2005, Comcast announced that the network would be a new offshoot brand of PBS Kids known as PBS Kids Sprout. The service would soft launch as a branded video on-demand (VOD) service that same day. PBS Kids Sprout launched its 24-hour cable channel on September 26, 2005, effectively replacing the PBS Kids Channel. At launch, PBS Kids Sprout reached around 16 million viewers across the Comcast and Insight cable systems.

The multi-platform approach was designed to appeal to different viewing habits; the Sprout channel featured dayparted programming blocks, with hosted segments such as activities, features, and promotions for supplemental content on Sprout's website. To increase the variety of its schedule, Sprout did not repackage short-form series into half-hour episodes with interstitial segments, as had usually been the case for series imported for U.S. broadcast. Unlike the primary PBS network and its associated PBS Kids and PBS Kids Go! programming blocks, all of which operated as non-commercial services, PBS Kids Sprout operated as an advertiser-supported service running traditional television commercials. However, advertising on the channel was only carried between programs in small quantities and were aimed towards parents and caregivers. Due to its ad-supported model, PBS Kids Sprout did not include any of the usual funding credits typically displayed at the beginning and end of programs on the primary PBS network.

In May 2009, it was announced that The Wiggles would be moving to PBS Kids Sprout from its previous broadcaster, Playhouse Disney (later Disney Junior and Disney Jr.), the morning preschool programming block on Disney Channel. This would coincide with the launch of a new programming block hosted by the group called Sprout's Wiggly Waffle. The reason for this move was due to competition from the Imagination Movers, a children's music group from New Orleans who received their own TV show in September 2008. The move took effect on August 24, 2009.

The following month, the channel rebranded to simply Sprout; however, the full name continued to be used in on-screen graphics to reflect PBS's ownership stake in the channel until November 30, 2013. A separate high-definition simulcast broadcast of the network was announced in May 2010 and was first launched in September 2010.

==== Acquisition by Comcast (through NBCUniversal) ====
Comcast acquired a 51% majority stake in NBCUniversal from General Electric on January 28, 2011, and would assume full ownership of the company in 2013. As a result, Comcast's interest in Sprout was turned over to the company. Apax Partners sold HIT Entertainment to Mattel on October 24, 2011, the sale did not include HIT's stake in Sprout, which was retained by Apax. On December 5, 2012, Sesame Workshop sold its 15% stake in Sprout to Comcast. On March 19, 2013, Comcast acquired the remaining 49% of NBCUniversal it did not already own, and concurrently acquired Apax's stake in Sprout. Comcast then acquired PBS's share in Sprout on November 12, 2013, giving it full ownership. As a result, the network's operations were brought under the NBCUniversal Cable Entertainment Group. The network's operations were later moved from Philadelphia to NBCUniversal's facilities in New York City.

While these acquisitions took place, starting on July 7, 2012, Sprout began to produce educational programming blocks for NBC and Telemundo, branded as "NBC Kids" and "MiTelemundo" respectively. Both blocks replaced Qubo (a previous joint venture between NBCUniversal, Ion Media, Corus Entertainment, Scholastic, and Classic Media), which had aired on NBC and Telemundo since its launch in September 2006, and continued to air via a third programming block on Ion Television as well as a separate 24-hour network until the brand was fully cancelled in February 2021. NBC Kids was cancelled on September 25, 2016 (one day before Sprout's eleventh anniversary) and was replaced by "The More You Know", a block produced by Litton Entertainment that would feature live-action documentary and lifestyle programs aimed at pre-teens and teenagers. MiTelemundo continued to air with its existing programming until January 6, 2018, when the block became programmed by Litton with Spanish-language dubs of The More You Know's programming, retaining the "MiTelemundo" name.

Under NBCUniversal ownership, Sprout began to increase its investments in original programming to better compete with Disney Jr. and the Nick Jr. Channel, with a goal to double its original series output to at least 30% of its schedule by the end of 2015, and displace older and non-exclusive library content in favor of original series and acquisitions exclusive to the channel. Sprout programs such as The Chica Show also earned increased visibility airing on NBC as part of the NBC Kids block.

Former logo used from September 26, 2015 to September 9, 2017.

On September 26, 2015, Sprout underwent a brand refresh to mark the tenth anniversary of its launch, with new on-air imaging inspired by modern technology and mobile devices, a new tiny house-inspired studio at 30 Rockefeller Plaza for its hosted morning block The Sunny Side Up Show, as well as the premiere of Nina's World—an original animated series spun off from its evening block The Good Night Show. Actress Alyssa Milano began to make appearances in interstitial segments as Sprout's "Mom-bassador", with a particular focus on the channel's public service campaign "Kindness Counts".

By then, nearly all shows inherited from the PBS Kids library were retired from Sprout's lineup. Over a year later, the 24-hour PBS Kids Channel, which Sprout had replaced back in 2005, was revived by PBS as a digital broadcast on its member stations and online television network on January 16, 2017.

The network's head Sandy Wax stated that Sprout also planned to experiment with more half-hour programs, and commission programming with more "complex stories" that can appeal better to older preschool audiences.

=== As Universal Kids (2017–2025) ===
The channel's first logo, used from September 9, 2017 to April 12, 2019.

In 2016, Comcast (through NBCUniversal) acquired DreamWorks Animation. Deirdre Brennan, formerly of Canadian media company Corus Entertainment, was named the new president of Sprout in January 2017, replacing the outgoing Sandy Wax.

On May 1, 2017, NBCUniversal announced that it would be rebranding Sprout on September 9, 2017 to Universal Kids; the relaunched network aimed to be "an umbrella brand for NBCUniversal's family offerings". Universal Kids would introduce primetime programming targeting a wider youth and pre-teen audience, while still carrying preschool programming as a block under the Sprout branding from 3 a.m. to 6 p.m. ET daily. Brennan explained that Sprout needed to "grow up with the rest of the family", and that Universal Kids would "offer something to 2 to 12 year olds that has a slightly different purpose—widening their eyes, opening their minds and celebrating many aspects of being a kid."

The network would launch with a slate of original non-scripted series, including Bear Grylls: Survival School and Top Chef Junior. NBCUniversal intended to make "significant" investments in original content for Universal Kids over the next three years, including original scripted programming. The launch lineup included a large number of international acquisitions, particularly from the U.K., Australia, and Canada (such as The Next Step and Nowhere Boys); Brennan acknowledged that since youth audiences had become "globally aware", the network wanted to showcase foreign series that had not yet aired in the United States. Universal Kids would also feature programing produced by Canadian studio DHX Media for Family Channel and its sister networks, as well as co-produce series with the company (such as the sitcom Bajillionaires); DHX had recently entered into a programming agreement with DreamWorks Animation for its networks.

DreamWorks would be leveraged by Universal Kids to bolster its programming, with linear television premieres of DreamWorks' Netflix series such as All Hail King Julien and Dragons: Riders of Berk as part of its launch lineup. Industry observers felt that the integration of DreamWorks IP with Universal Kids would help NBCUniversal establish a viable multi-platform competitor to other major children's networks. The network planned to continue investing in preschool programming for the Sprout block; Brennan stated of Sprout that "the greatest thing is, there is nothing to fix there. Sprout is a beautiful brand. If anything, we want to invest more in original production. There is more we can explore there."

Universal Kids saw significant declines in viewership in comparison to its previous incarnation as Sprout, with IndieWire reporting a 30% drop in 2017, followed by 73% in 2018. Brennan was replaced by Frances Berwick as network president in February 2019. In April of that year, Universal Kids unveiled a new logo and branding designed by the design agency Kill 2 Birds. On June 19, it was reported that Universal Kids had ceased development of original programming and laid off its development staff or transferred them to other NBCUniversal properties. Therefore, the channel would only rely primarily on DreamWorks content, acquisitions, and its remaining slate of original programming. Some Universal Kids original series, such as American Ninja Warrior Junior, Super Wings and Where's Waldo?, moved to NBCUniversal's new streaming service Peacock.

The network's branding change and viewership declines timed out to a general nadir for traditional cable/satellite channels tailored to children, as all networks across the industry have been de-emphasized for their associated streaming services. In its year-end viewership rankings for 2024, Variety put Universal Kids at 141st place among 154 cable and broadcast networks, based on Nielsen data.

==== Closure ====
On January 7, 2025, customer notices sent out by cable providers mentioned that Universal Kids would be closing down on March 6, 2025, with NBCUniversal confirming the channel's closure date on January 13. The network's closure came after Comcast confirmed to spin off NBCUniversal's cable properties excluding Bravo into a separately-traded company owned by its shareholders known as Versant, an announcement which notably excluded Universal Kids. Bravo was also excluded from the spin-off and remaining under the NBCUniversal umbrella due to it being positioned as a major content provider for Peacock, rather than a burden for a spin-off. The network's website was redirected in its final days to Universal Kids Resort's website. The channel closed down at midnight ET on March 6, 2025 following an interstitial musical segment from Norman Picklestripes after in which a screen with looping music stating "Universal Kids is no longer in service" was shown (eventually replaced by individual providers' own advisory cards). Universal Kids was eventually replaced by MeTV Toons on DirecTV channel 295 on June 30, 2025.

== Programming ==
At the time of the closure, Universal Kids's most prominent scheduling pattern was marathon 'best-of volume' blocks of one program featuring individual segments aired continuously for 1–3 hours rather than a traditional block of consecutive episodes. This scheduling model began in the summer of 2020 and emulated the model of the official YouTube channels for prevailing children's series (which either feature a continuous live stream of the series or an uploaded video several hours in length containing multiple episodes). Traditional marathons of episodes were also scheduled.

Previously, original programs produced for the network included the Top Chef spin-off Top Chef Junior, the game shows Beat the Clock and The Noise, the bedroom redecoration show Get Out of My Room, and American Ninja Warrior Junior. The channel also airs several series produced by DreamWorks Animation (some of which were originally produced for the streaming service Netflix) and has acquired and co-produced programs with international partners. In 2021, the network acquired exclusive television rights to carry content from the popular YouTube channel Cocomelon.

=== Preschool programming ===
As PBS Kids Sprout, the channel featured reruns of multiple preschool shows from the PBS Kids library, such as Sesame Street, Dragon Tales, Sagwa, the Chinese Siamese Cat, Teletubbies, Barney & Friends, Thomas & Friends, Angelina Ballerina, Make Way for Noddy and Super Why!. Even with PBS selling its interest in Sprout to NBCUniversal and the removal of the "PBS Kids" branding in the channel's name in November 2013 (with Sid the Science Kid being the last PBS show added to Sprout's lineup before the acquisition), many shows from its library continued to air on the network under extended license agreements.

By September 26, 2015, however, most of PBS's library was dropped from Sprout's lineup, with only two PBS shows, Caillou and The Berenstain Bears (both of which have been on Sprout since its launch), continuing to air on the network. The former aired until March 31, 2019, while the latter aired until Sprout's rebranding into Universal Kids on September 9, 2017. Less than three years after PBS sold its share in Sprout to NBCUniversal, Space Racers (which aired on select PBS stations) was moved to Sprout for its second season on October 31, 2016, and continued to air into the Universal Kids rebranding until March 22, 2020. Sometime after the channel rebranded into Universal Kids, Barney & Friends and Bob the Builder both returned to the channel's lineup, with the former airing from December 17, 2018 to January 25, 2020, and the latter airing from April 22, 2019 to July 7, 2019. Both of those aforementioned shows, along with PBS's long-running Curious George (produced by Universal Animation Studios, but never aired on neither PBS Kids Sprout and Sprout nor Universal Kids) are also made available on NBCUniversal's streaming service Peacock.

After losing the rights to most of PBS's library, yet prior to the Universal Kids rebranding, Sprout continued to premiere new series such as Kody Kapow, joining a slate that had included Dot, Nina's World, and the DreamWorks Animation-produced Noddy, Toyland Detective. New acquisitions such as Masha and the Bear would premiere on the Sprout block alongside the relaunch.

On August 14, 2017, Sprout replaced its long-running morning block Sunny Side Up with Sprout House (renamed Snug's House in 2018), which is presented by Carly Ciarrocchi and the new character Snug, a talking dog portrayed by puppeteer Chris Palmieri, through 90-second segments throughout the block. The program was designed to be more flexible to produce than its predecessor, with a different "tiny house" set with additional areas and camera options. Unlike Sunny Side Up, the segments are pre-recorded rather than broadcast live; supervising producer Vinny Steves felt that the live format was too "limiting", and explained that the new format was also designed to enable the segments to be distributed on digital platforms such as social media. With the launch of Sprout House, the network began to downplay Chica, even though she was still featured in certain segments (such as Chica at School).

== International ==
As of October 2023, Universal Kids had an estimated reach of 47.232 million households in the United States. As with most children's channels, Universal Kids operated both an Eastern Time Zone and Pacific Time Zone feed. DreamWorks Channel served as the network's worldwide equivalent and Sky Kids for the United Kingdom through Comcast's Sky division even before its closure.

== See also ==
- Peacock – through which some Universal Kids contents are hosted
- DreamWorks Channel – the network's international counterpart
