= Colin Williams (producer) =

Colin Williams is a Northern Ireland film and television producer.

Williams founded Sixteen South in 2007 and since then has produced eleven shows including Pajanimals in partnership with The Jim Henson Company, Big & Small, Big City Park and Sesame Tree in partnership with Sesame Workshop. He is currently producing Lily's Driftwood Bay, which will soon air in over 100 countries and premiered in May 2014. He was one of the finalists in the Ernst & Young Entrepreneur of the Year Award Programme in 2013, as well as being named as one of Northern Ireland’s leaders in business.
