= Pinkalicious =

Children's book series

- Pinkalicious 10th anniversary book cover
- Author: Victoria Kann; Elizabeth Kann
- Illustrator: Victoria Kann
- Cover artist: Victoria Kann
- Country: United States
- Language: English
- Genre: Children's literature
- Publisher: HarperCollins Publishers
- Published: May 23, 2006-present
- No. of books: 66

Pinkalicious is a series of children's picture books written and illustrated by Victoria Kann. The first two books, Pinkalicious and Purplicious, were co-written with her sister, Elizabeth Kann. The books are aimed at ages 4–8, and are based on Victoria's two daughters and their love for the color pink.

== Premise ==
The stories center on Pinkalicious Pinkerton, an ego-centered imaginative young girl who loves the color pink to the point of worship (as seen in Pinkalicious & Peterrific), and are told in first-person narrative. They are also about her younger brother, Peter, who likes riding his scooter and playing with blocks.

== Books ==
| No. | Title | Published | Notes |
|---|---|---|---|
| 1 | Pinkalicious | 23 May 2006 | One of the books adapted into an episode in Pinkalicious & Peterrific |
| 2 | Purplicious | 16 October 2007 | |
| 3 | Goldilicious | 26 May 2009 | |
| 4 | Silverlicious | 8 April 2010; 1 February 2011 | |
| 5 | Pinkalicious and the Pink Drink | 25 May 2010 | |
| 6 | Pinkalicious: School Rules! | 22 June 2010 | One of the books adapted into an episode in Pinkalicious & Peterrific; Ms. Penny, who first appeared in Pinkalicious and the New Teacher, replaces Mr. Pushkin as the teacher in this episode. |
| 7 | Pinkalicious: Tickled Pink | 27 July 2010 | |
| 8 | Pinkalicious: Pink around the Rink | 5 October 2010 | |
| 9 | Pinkalicious: Pink of Hearts | 21 November 2011 | |
| 10 | Pinkalicious: Pinkie Promise | 26 July 2011 | |
| 11 | Pinkalicious and the Pink Pumpkin | 26 July 2011 | |
| 12 | Pinkalicious and the Pinkerrific Playdate | 1 October 2011 | |
| 13 | Pinkalicious: Soccer Star | 28 May 2012 | |
| 14 | Pinkalicious and the Pink Hat Parade | 24 January 2012 | |
| 15 | Pinkalicious: The Princess of Pink Slumber Party | 21 February 2012 | One of the books adapted into an episode in Pinkalicious & Peterrific |
| 16 | Pinkalicious and the Pinkatastic Zoo Day | 14 August 2012 | |
| 17 | Pinkalicious: Fairy House | 15 December 2012 | One of the books adapted into an episode in Pinkalicious & Peterrific |
| 18 | Pinkalicious: Flower Girl | 4 March 2013 | |
| 19 | Emeraldalicious | 29 January 2013 | |
| 20 | Pinkalicious: Puptastic! | 30 April 2013 | |
| 21 | Pinkalicious: Pink or Treat! | 23 July 2013 | |
| 22 | Pinkalicious: Merry Pinkmas! | 24 September 2013 | |
| 23 | Pinkalicious and the Cupcake Calamity | 1 October 2013 | |
| 24 | Pinkalicious and the Perfect Present | 21 January 2014 | |
| 25 | Pinkalicious: Eggstraordinary Easter | 28 January 2014 | |
| 26 | Pinkalicious: The Royal Tea Party | 13 May 2014 | |
| 27 | Pinkalicious: Crazy Hair Day | 13 May 2014 | |
| 28 | Pinkalicious and the New Teacher | 24 June 2014 | |
| 29 | Pinkalicious: Thanksgiving Helper | 26 August 2014 | |
| 30 | Pinkalicious: Tutu-rrific! | 7 October 2014 | |
| 31 | Pinkalicious: Cherry Blossom | 10 February 2015 | |
| 32 | Aqualicious | 3 March 2015 | #1 New York Times bestselling author-artist; One of the books adapted into an episode in Pinkalicious & Peterrific |
| 33 | Pinkalicious: Mother's Day Surprise | 10 March 2015 | One of the books adapted into an episode in Pinkalicious & Peterrific |
| 34 | Pinkalicious and the Pink Parakeet | 12 May 2015 | |
| 35 | Pinkalicious: School Lunch | 23 June 2015 | |
| 36 | Pinkalicious and the Snow Globe | 6 October 2015 | |
| 37 | Pinkalicious and the Sick Day | 6 October 2015 | |
| 38 | Pinkalicious and the Little Butterfly | 8 March 2016 | |
| 39 | Pinkalicious and Planet Pink | 8 March 2016 | |
| 40 | Pinkalicious and Aqua, the Mini-Mermaid | 3 May 2016 | |
| 41 | Pinkalicious: Story Time | 10 May 2016 | |
| 42 | Pinkalicious: Apples, Apples, Apples! | 6 September 2016 | |
| 43 | Pinkalicious: Fashion Fun | 4 October 2016 | |
| 44 | Peterrific | 2 May 2017 | One of the books adapted into an episode in Pinkalicious & Peterrific |
| 45 | Pinkalicious and the Babysitter | 3 October 2017 | |
| 46 | Pinkalicious at the Fair | 2 January 2018 | |
| 47 | Pinkalicious and the Pirates | 5 June 2018 | |
| 48 | Pinkalicious and the Amazing Sled Run | 2 October 2018 | One of the books adapted into an episode in Pinkalicious & Peterrific |
| 49 | Pinkalicious and the Flower Fairy | 31 December 2018 | |
| 50 | Pinkalicious and the Merminnies | 20 February 2019; 6 January 2020 | |
| 51 | Pinkalicious: Fishtastic! | 7 May 2019 | |
| 52 | Pinkalicious: Dragon to the Rescue | 4 September 2019 | |
| 53 | Pinkalicious and the Pinkadorable Pony | 2 June 2020 | |
| 54 | Pinkalicious and the Pinkettes | 29 September 2020 | |
| 55 | Pinkalicious: Happy Birthday! | 16 February 2021 | |
| 56 | Pinkalicious and the Robo-Pup | 4 May 2021 | |
| 57 | Pinkalicious: Treasuretastic | 21 September 2021 | |
| 58 | Rubylicious | 28 September 2021 | |
| 59 | Pinkalicious: Message in a Bottle | 22 February 2022 | |
| 60 | Pinkalicious: Kindergarten Fun | 14 June 2022 | |
| 61 | Pinkalicious and the Holiday Sweater | 11 October 2022 | |
| 62 | Pinkalicious and the Pinkamazing Little Library | 27 June 2023 | |
| 63 | Pinkalicious: Kittens! Kittens! Kittens! | 19 March 2024 | |
| 64 | Pinkalicious: Lost in Paris | 3 September 2024 | |
| 65 | Pinkalicious: Hop, Skip, and Jump | 22 December 2026 | |
| 66 | Pinkalicious and the Pinkatastic Father's Day | 4 May 2027 | |

== Reception ==
Shanea Goldizen of Library Point describes Pinkalicious as "a colorful, scrumptious feast for the eyes and will keep your kids reading and re-reading." A Publishers Weekly review said that 'the artwork creates visual interest to keep pink-loving gals involved in this tale of wonderful-to-wretched excess.'

== Adaptations ==
=== Musical ===
On March 3, 2007, Pinkalicious was adapted into a 50-minute musical, named Pinkalicious the Musical. In it, Pinkalicious cannot stop eating pink cupcakes despite her parents warning her. After eating too many, she is diagnosed by a doctor with "Pinkititis", an illness that turns her completely pink. She doesn't seem to mind, because it is her favorite color. But when it goes too far, she must figure out a way to stop it.

=== TV series ===
Pinkalicious & Peterrific is a children's television series that follows the adventures of Pinkalicious and her brother Peter as they imagine how the world looks through Pinkalicious' artful eye. The series premiered on PBS Kids on February 19, 2018, and is co-produced by WGBH and Sixteen South.
