= Samson & Goliath (disambiguation) =

Samson & Goliath is a superhero cartoon made in 1967 by Hanna-Barbera Productions.

Samson & Goliath may also refer to:

- The characters from the 2008-11 BBC Northern Ireland/Sesame Workshop coproduction Sesame Tree
- Samson & Goliath, a 1990 Filipino film by M-Zet Productions
- Samson and Goliath (cranes), large gantry cranes in Belfast, Northern Ireland
