= Pajanimals =

American-British children's television series

- Also known as: The Pajanimals
- Genre: Children's television
- Created by: Jeff Muncy; Alex Rockwell
- Directed by: David Gumpel
- Starring: Shorts; John Kennedy; Alice Dinnean-Vernon; Donna Kimball; Victor Yerrid; Series; Donna Kimball; Sarah Lyle; Michael Winsor; Victor Yerrid
- Opening theme: "Pajanimals Theme"
- Ending theme: "La-La-Lullaby"
- Composer: Michael and Patty Silversher
- Countries of origin: United States; United Kingdom
- Original language: English
- No. of seasons: 2
- No. of episodes: 52 (and 11 shorts)

Production
- Executive producers: Lisa Henson; Halle Stanford; Jeff Muncy; Alex Rockwell; Andrew Beecham
- Producer: Colin Williams
- Production locations: Belfast, Northern Ireland
- Running time: 3 minutes (shorts); 11 minutes (full episodes)
- Production companies: John Doze Studios; Ingenious; Sixteen South; The Jim Henson Company

Original release
- Network: PBS Kids Sprout
- Release: November 2, 2008 – March 8, 2013

Pajanimals (a portmanteau of the words pajamas and animals), also known as Jim Henson's Pajanimals, is a children's television series created by Jeff Muncy and Alex Rockwell. The series was produced by The Jim Henson Company and Sixteen South. The series was filmed in Northern Ireland. It aired on PBS Kids Sprout (now Universal Kids) in the United States, and Sprout was a co-producer of the series. As of July 2025, the series is featured on the Yippee TV streaming service.

== Premise ==
The show is about the Pajanimals, four friendly animals who share the last moments of playtime before bedtime, sing songs, and learn a valuable lesson by traveling to whimsical lands to get bedtime advice from its inhabitants. By the end of the episode, someone would tell the viewers a moral regarding on how the situation was solved.

== Characters ==
=== Main ===
- Apollo (performed by John Kennedy in the shorts and Michael Winsor (US) and Edward Cross (UK) in the series) is a friendly green-and-purple dog who is the leader of the group. He enjoys watching the night sky and playing with his toy rocket ship. He loves his rocket flashlight and sometimes sleeps with it. When they fly through the sky, his bed is a rocket ship.
- Squacky (performed by Victor Yerrid (US) and Alexander Littler (UK) in both the shorts and series) is an energetic, excitable, blue-and-yellow duck. In the music videos, Squacky spoke in a frontal lisp, but does not in the TV series. He sleeps with a blankie which doubles as his cape whenever he pretends to be Super Squacky. He often adds "squack" to words when he speaks, like "squacksolutely" for "absolutely". When they fly through the sky or dive into the Big, Blue Sea, his bed is a plane or a submarine. He is the youngest of the group.
- Sweetpea Sue (performed by Donna Kimball (US) and Gabrielle Illesley (UK) in both the shorts and series) is a quiet, shy, and smart pink-and-orange horse with buckteeth and speaks with a Southern accent. She is the oldest in the group. She has a stuffed daisy pillow named Daisy Puff that she always sleeps with. When they fly through the sky, her bed is a hot air balloon.
- Cowbella (performed by Alice Dinnean-Vernon in the shorts and Sarah Lyle (US) and Isobel Cross (UK) in the series) is a purple, pink-and-white cow who loves princesses, unicorns, and all sorts of girly things. She had an Italian accent in the music videos but does not have it in the TV series. She sleeps with a stuffed unicorn named Princess Lucy. When they fly through the sky, her bed is a carriage.

=== Supporting ===
- Mom and Dad are the parents of the Pajanimals. They are heard but never seen on screen, not even their shadows. Their voice actors are unknown.
- Bedtime Bunny (performed by Donna Kimball) is a sleepy white rabbit. She lives in the Land of Hush and often falls asleep during conversations. The Pajanimals would often go to her for bedtime advice when they ride Sweetpea Sue's bed or Cowbella's bed to her. Whenever a loud noise is made, Bedtime Bunny will widen her eyes and fall to the ground.
- Jerry Bear (performed by Victor Yerrid) is a yellow bear. He lives in the Friendly Forest. The Pajanimals would often go to him for bedtime advice when they ride Squacky's bed, Cowbella's bed, Apollo's bed, or Sweetpea Sue's bed to him. He would often give bear hugs to the Pajanimals.
  - Otis Owl (performed by Paul Currie) is a brown owl who first appeared in the second season, who is good friends with Jerry Bear. He lives in the Friendly Forest. Otis Owl and Jerry Bear first met at Woodwork School. Otis gives a loud hoot when he is excited.
- Moon (performed by Michael Winsor) is a bespectacled nightcap-wearing personification of the moon that is found in the night sky. The Pajanimals would often go to him for bedtime advice when they ride Apollo's bed to him.
- Mr. Happy Birthday (performed by Josh Elwell) is a dark-blue-and-orange porcupine who is the mascot of all birthdays. He lives in Birthday Land. The Pajanimals would occasionally go to him for birthday advice when they ride Sweetpea Sue's bed or Cowbella's bed to him. Mr. Happy Birthday has a tendency to mispronounce the word Pajanimals. A running gag in the show is that his quills tend to pop any nearby balloons that touch them.
- Ellie Octopus (performed by Sarah Lyle) is a purple octopus that lives in the Big Blue Sea. In her first appearance in "An Octopus Hug", Sweetpea Sue was afraid of octopuses until she met Ellie. The Pajanimals would often go to her for bedtime advice when they ride Squacky's bed to her. Ellie would always give the Pajanimals "octopus huggles".
- Coach Whistler (performed by Paul Currie) is a dark-blue walrus coach with a red-banded whistle who lives in the Land of Play. The Pajanimals would often go to him for bedtime advice when they ride Squacky's bed, Sweetpea Sue's bed, or Cowbella's bed to him. Coach Whistler is always big on team spirit.
- Edwin (performed by Paul Currie) is an orange-skinned, bespectacled human man who lives in Storybook Land. The Pajanimals would often go to him for bedtime advice when they ride Cowbella's bed to him. Edwin plays different roles during the Pajanimals' visits to Storybook Land.
- Granny Pearl (performed by Donna Kimball) is an elderly green sea turtle who lives in the Big Blue Sea. The Pajanimals would often go to her for bedtime advice when they ride Squacky's bed to her. She is a replacement for Ellie Octopus who is absent in the second season.
- Hank and Frank (performed by Victor Yerrid and Paul Currie respectively) are two brown beaver brothers. They live in the Land of Build-It where they work as construction workers. The Pajanimals would often go to them for bedtime advice when they ride Squacky's bed or Apollo's bed to them.

== Production ==
The series was originally announced on June 2, 2008 as a co-production between The Jim Henson Company and 4Kids Entertainment for premiere on PBS Kids Sprout in November. The show was produced as a series of ten three-minute-long music video shorts that aired as part of The Good Night Show overnight block.

On April 7, 2011, The Jim Henson Company announced they had partnered with Northern Irish production company Sixteen South (the producer of Sesame Tree) to produce a full-length series of 52 11-minute episodes that would premiere on Sprout in the fall. The full-length TV series shows the Pajanimals doing some playtime before getting ready for bed. It also introduces some characters exclusive to this show who the Pajanimals go for bedtime advice or any other problems. At the end of the episode, the TV show exclusive-character the Pajanimals visit would tell the viewer the moral of the episode.

== Episodes ==
=== Shorts (2008) ===
1. "Stick to the Plan" – Sweetpea Sue helps her fellow Pajanimal friends to follow the steps in getting ready for bed; first taking a bath, then brushing their teeth and finally putting on their pajamas.
2. "Stay in Bed (Put on Your Sleepy Head)" – Squacky has the "squirmies" and wants to get out of bed, but his fellow Pajanimals remind him that nighttime is for sleeping.
3. "I Love to Hug My Lovie" – The Pajanimals sing about their "lovies" that help them to get to sleep at night.
4. "How Do I Know If It's Morning Time?" – Squacky wants to get out of bed and play, but cannot because it is not yet morning (which annoys all of the other Pajanimals).
5. "Goodnight to Mom" – The Pajanimals sing fondly of their mom and dad and imagine what they might be doing at night.
6. "Sleeping Makes Me Feel Alright" – The Pajanimals sing a song about how sleeping at night helps give one enough energy for the next day.
7. "What's That Sound? (Night Will Sing Us All to Sleep)" – When Apollo is bothered by nighttime sounds, his friends help him to hear how the noises can become a soothing lullaby. The Pajanimals sing about sounds they hear at night. Cowbella sings about a clock ticking, Squacky sings about water dripping in the bathroom, Sweetpea Sue sings about the wind blowing through the leaves, and Apollo gazes out at the moon singing about the sounds all around them.
8. "Lights in the Dark" – Apollo is afraid of the dark, so his fellow Pajanimal friends share with him the things that light their way at night. Cowbella gazes out at the moon, Squacky shows how he makes shadow puppets with his nightlight, while Sweetpea Sue illustrates how the dark helps calm and comfort her.
9. "Let's Make Our Bodies Tired" – The Pajanimals do fun exercises to tire themselves out before bedtime and sing a song where they "jiggle, jumble and jump".
10. "A Scary Dream" – When Cowbella has a nightmare, the other Pajanimals try to calm her through song by explaining that it is just a dream, a "story in your head".
11. "La-La-Lullaby" – The Pajanimals sing their signature song to learn about how earth sleeps and how to comfort oneself with a lullaby.

=== Season 1 (2011–12) ===
1. "Blankie in the Laundry" – Squacky is disappointed when his blankie is in the laundry because he feels he has got nothing to hug. In order to help Squacky, the Pajanimals ride Sweetpea Sue's bed to the Land of Hush, where they turn to Bedtime Bunny for help.
2. "A Super Sweet Night" – Following a party, Cowbella ends up eating too much candy from her goodie bag and has too much energy in her. When this prevents Cowbella from sleeping, the Pajanimals ride Sweetpea Sue's bed to the Land of Hush, where they turn to Bedtime Bunny for help.
3. "Tomorrow is Brand New" – Apollo isn't having a good day lately, a couple things go wrong which includes: hitting his head on Cowbella's bed, his rocket ship sheets are still in the laundry, and his block tower being knocked down by Squacky. When all of this ends up making Apollo mad and sad at the same time, the Pajanimals ride his bed to the Night Sky where they turn to the Moon for help.
4. "Super Squacky" – Squacky is excited to see the superhero movie: "Fantastic Splash" tomorrow. When Squacky is too excited to fall asleep, the Pajanimals ride Cowbella's bed to the Land of Hush, where they turn to Bedtime Bunny for help.
5. "The Not-So Great Outdoors" – Squacky is scared of the outdoors and does not want to go outside at all. To solve this problem, the Pajanimals ride his bed to the Friendly Forest, where they turn to Jerry Bear for help.
6. "Dream a Happy Dream" – Cowbella is worried about having a nightmare and plans not to sleep. When this continues to bother Cowbella, the Pajanimals ride her bed to the Friendly Forest, where they turn to Jerry Bear for help.
7. "A Colorful Problem" – Apollo and Cowbella both like the color purple and want the purple crayon. When Apollo and Cowbella do not want to share the same color, the Pajanimals ride Cowbella's bed to the Friendly Forest, where they turn to Jerry Bear for help.
8. "Night Will Sing Us to Sleep" – Sweetpea Sue is bothered by loud noises like Squacky playing his drums too loud. When a thunderstorm at night bothers Sweetpea Sue, the Pajanimals ride Cowbella's bed to the Friendly Forest, where they turn to Jerry Bear for help.
9. "Missing Mom and Dad" – Sweetpea Sue is missing her Mom and Dad when going to sleep because they seem far away to her. In order to help Sweetpea Sue, the Pajanimals ride Apollo's bed to the Night Sky where they turn to the Moon for help.
10. "Light in the Sky" – Squacky has developed a fear of the dark even in his mind. When Squacky has a hard time sleeping because of this, the Pajanimals ride Apollo's bed to the Night Sky where they turn to the Moon for help.
11. "Home Sweet Home" – The Pajanimals are preparing to go on an airplane to Aunt Tilly's house for a week tomorrow. When Sweetpea Sue is worried about leaving home, the Pajanimals ride Apollo's bed to the Night Sky where they turn to the Moon for help.
12. "The Rocket Ride" – The Pajanimals are anxious to go to the Fun Park tomorrow. Apollo is finally tall enough to ride the rocket ride, but he soon confesses that he is afraid of the ride. To help him overcome his fear, the Pajanimals ride Sweetpea Sue's bed to the Land of Hush, where they turn to Bedtime Bunny for help.
13. "A Present for Mom" – Apollo is worried that his painting would not be a good present to give to his mom on her birthday tomorrow. When this continues to bother Apollo, the Pajanimals ride Sweetpea Sue's bed to the Birthday Land, where they turn to Mr. Happy Birthday for help.
14. "Happy Birthday Sweetpea Sue" – Sweetpea Sue's birthday is tomorrow and she is worried that the attendees of her birthday party will not have any fun, that there would run out of cake, or nobody would like Strawberry Pop. When this continues to bother Sweetpea Sue, the Pajanimals ride Cowbella's bed to the Birthday Land, where they turn to Mr. Happy Birthday for help.
15. "Apollo's Special Day" – Cowbella is jealous because Apollo's birthday is tomorrow and does not feel like attending. The Pajanimals ride Sweetpea Sue's bed to the Birthday Land, where they turn to Mr. Happy Birthday for help.
16. "An Octopus Hug" – Sweetpea Sue becomes afraid of octopuses. To help her get over her fear of octopuses, the Pajanimals take Squacky's bed to the Big Blue Sea, where they meet Ellie Octopus.
17. "No Bath for Me" – Cowbella is itchy from going to the beach. When she refuses to take her bath because she thinks it will not be fun, the Pajanimals take Squacky's bed to the Big Blue Sea, where they turn to Ellie Octopus for help.
18. "Share Day" – Share Day is at school tomorrow and Sweetpea Sue is nervous about sharing Daisy Puff with the class. When this continues to bother Sweetpea Sue, the Pajanimals take Squacky's bed to the Big Blue Sea, where they turn to Ellie Octopus for help.
19. "Puppy Love" – The Pajanimals are given a job by their parents to take care of their grandparents' puppy Fluffy for the next day. When the Pajanimals are unsure of how to take turns taking care of Fluffy, they ride Sweetpea Sue's bed to the Land of Play, where they turn to Coach Whistler for help.
20. "Winning Isn't Everything" – Apollo is disappointed that he keeps losing every race. When this continues to bother Apollo and make him mad and sad at the same time, the Pajanimals ride Squacky's bed to the Land of Play, where they go to Coach Whistler for help.
21. "Try, Try Again" – The Pajanimals are going to be taught how to play baseball tomorrow by their father. The problem there is that Apollo is nervous at the fact that he won't do well at baseball. To help Apollo with his problem, the other Pajanimals turn to Coach Whistler for help.
22. "Game Day" – Squacky finds himself addicted to a hand-held video game. This proves to be a problem when the other Pajanimals want Squacky to play with them tomorrow, and Squacky has a hard time sleeping. The Pajanimals ride his bed to the Land of Play, where they turn to Coach Whistler for help.
23. "Under the Bed" – Squacky's new ball "Ballie" rolls under his bed, but he is afraid to go under the bed to get it due to a "monster living under the bed". He cannot sleep, so the Pajanimals ride Cowbella's bed to Storybook Land, where they go to see Edwin (pretending to be a knight) to learn about facing their fears.
24. "Queen for a Night" – Cowbella has been a little bit bossy lately yet claims that she wants the others to listen to her. The Pajanimals ride her bed to Storybook Land, where they end up turning to Edwin (pretending to be a King) for help.
25. "House of Pancakes" – The Pajanimals found out from their mom that they will have waffles instead of pancakes for breakfast tomorrow, which upsets Sweetpea Sue because she is unsure of how to like trying new things. When Sweetpea Sue is bothered by this, the Pajanimals ride Cowbella's bed to Storybook Land, where they end up turning to Edwin (pretending to be the Royal Chef) for help.
26. "I'm Sorry, Really Sorry" – Cowbella accidentally gets paint on Sweetpea Sue's Daisy Puff which angers Sweetpea Sue. When Sweetpea Sue does not want to forgive Cowbella for this incident, Squacky and Apollo go to see Edwin (pretending to be the Royal Magician) for help and see that Edwin also has a problem when he accidentally turned the Royal Baker into a frog.

=== Season 2 (2012–13) ===
1. "The Wonderfully Different Squacky" – When Apollo, Sweetpea Sue, and Cowbella notice that Squacky is the most different out of the entire gang, Squacky becomes worried and dislikes the fact that he is far different from the others. When this continues to bother Squacky, the Pajanimals ride his bed to the Big Blue Sea, where they turn to Granny Pearl for help.
2. "Time Out for Two" – Cowbella and Squacky end up fighting and their mom ends up sending them to their time out corners to calm down. When Cowbella and Squacky do calm down and worry that their mom is still angry with them, Apollo and Sweetpea Sue turn to Bedtime Bunny for help.
3. "Off to My School Adventure" – Apollo and Sweetpea Sue start school tomorrow and Sweetpea Sue starts to get nervous enough to not be able to sleep. When the Pajanimals ride Cowbella's bed to the Friendly Forest, where they turn to Jerry Bear for help, they end up learning about the same experience that Jerry Bear had when he first met Otis Owl at Woodwork School and they had become friends ever since.
4. "A Laugh a Minute" – Squacky puts on a magic show and Sweetpea Sue laughs at Squacky because she thinks his tricks are silly which makes Squacky sad. When Squacky is still sad at bedtime and Sweetpea Sue is still laughing about it, Apollo and Cowbella turn to Bedtime Bunny for help.
5. "Snow Business" – When the Pajanimals see it snowing outside their house, they want to go outside in the snow. But they cannot because it is almost bedtime. At bedtime, Pajanimals cannot sleep because they have to wait till tomorrow to play in the snow. When they do not want to wait, they ride Sweetpea Sue's bed to the Land of Hush, where the Pajanimals turn to Bedtime Bunny for help.
6. "Oops" – Squacky gets excited for being able to sleep without a diaper as part of a plan he worked on with his Dad. He ends up getting sad after having an accident by wetting himself and his bed when he had drunk a lot of water and did not go to the bathroom in time before bed. When this starts to bother Squacky, the Pajanimals ride Apollo's bed to the Night Sky where they turn to the Moon for help.
7. "Let's Play Together" – When Cowbella and Squacky learn about the card game Steps and Stairs (which Apollo and Sweetpea Sue learned in school), they learn that Steps and Stairs is for big kids making them mad and sad at the same time. When this continues to bother Cowbella and Squacky, the Pajanimals ride Cowbella's bed to the Land of Play, where they turn to Coach Whistler for help.
8. "Special Things" – Squacky does not want his blankie to be used for a pirate sail in Apollo's pirate game as Squacky considers his blankie special. When this continues to bother Squacky and Apollo, Sweetpea Sue and Cowbella turn to Granny Pearl for help.
9. "Sing a Pajanimal Song" – The Pajanimals form a band yet Apollo has not been practicing with the others. When Apollo forgets the parts of the band's song and gets frustrated, the Pajanimals ride Cowbella's bed to Storybook Land, where they turn to Edwin (pretending to be a King) for help at the same time when his Royal Band does not show up.
10. "Spooky Costumes" – When the Pajanimals tell Cowbella that they are real scary ghosts, Skeletons and other spooky things, Cowbella gets scared to go trick-or-treating on Halloween. When this starts to bother Cowbella, the Pajanimals ride her bed to Storybook Land, where they turn to Edwin (pretending to be a knight) for help.
11. "Ouch" – While Apollo rides on his scooter, he falls off and scrapes his arm and elbow. This causes to lead Apollo to proclaim and decide that he does not want to ride on his scooter again. When this continues to bother Apollo even to the part where he is afraid of getting injured riding his scooter again, the Pajanimals ride Sweetpea Sue's bed to the Land of Play, where they turn to Coach Whistler for help.
12. "I Was a Baby" – Squacky is disappointed that he is the youngest while the other Pajanimals can do things that he cannot. When this continues to bother Squacky, the Pajanimals ride his bed to the Big Blue Sea, where they turn to Granny Pearl for help.
13. "Team Fort" – Apollo and Squacky end up in a fight with Sweetpea Sue and Cowbella when it comes to building a fort out of each other's things. When this continues to bother the Pajanimals, they ride Squacky's bed to the Land of Build-It to turn to Hank and Frank for help.
14. "Off to Work They Go" – The Pajanimals want to go to the park tomorrow with Mom. Yet Mom and Dad are going to work tomorrow and Aunt Sally will be coming over to babysit the Pajanimals. When this continues to bother the Pajanimals with them wondering why Mom and Dad have to work, they ride Squacky's bed to the Land of Build-It, where they turn to Hank and Frank for help.
15. "Mountains of Messiness" – After a pillow mountain made by the Pajanimals collapses from Cowbella's twirly-whirly the Pajanimals had to clean up the mess before bed. Cowbella does not feel like they do not want to clean up until Princess Lucy is buried under all the fallen pillows. When Cowbella does not want to wait until tomorrow to find Princess Lucy, the Pajanimals ride Apollo's bed to the Land of Build-It, where they turn to Hank and Frank for help.
16. "One Teacup, Two Friends" – Cowbella and Sweetpea Sue are having a tea party where they inherited two teacups from their grandmother. Cowbella gets a blue one and Sweetpea Sue gets the red one. However, Sweetpea Sue's cup is broken, and Cowbella refuses to share, which makes Sweetpea Sue mad and sad at the same time. In order to help them, Squacky & Apollo turn to the Moon for help.
17. "Mom is Amazing" – Tomorrow is Mother's Day and the Pajanimals want to make it special. When Sweetpea Sue thinks of a plan of doing all the chores for Mom, she finds that it is a lot of work. When this worries the Pajanimals, they ride Apollo's bed to the Night Sky where they turn to the Moon for help.
18. "The Cow's Meow" – When playing "House", Cowbella wants to play the cat, Princess Kitty-Kitty, instead of a puppy much to the objection of Sweetpea Sue. When Sweetpea Sue and Cowbella get into an argument enough to make Sweetpea Sue frustrated, Squacky and Apollo turn to Jerry Bear and Otis Owl for help.
19. "No More Bullies" – Apollo is depressed when some of the bigger kids had made fun of his big ears and that they will not let him play with them. When Apollo is still bothered by this, the Pajanimals ride Sweetpea Sue's bed to the Friendly Forest, where they turn to Jerry Bear and Otis Owl for help.
20. "We're Going Camping" – The Pajanimals are going on a family camping trip tomorrow and practice in preparation for the camping trip. Squacky, Cowbella, and Sweetpea Sue learn from Apollo that they will sleep outside. When Squacky, Cowbella, and Sweetpea Sue are uncomfortable at the idea of sleeping outside, Apollo rides his bed to the Friendly Forest, where he turns to Jerry Bear and Otis Owl for help.
21. "The Dentist Jitters" – When the Pajanimals are pretending to be doctors, Sweetpea Sue is told by her dad that she has a dentist appointment tomorrow. When Sweetpea Sue is still nervous about the dentist, the Pajanimals ride Cowbella's bed to Storybook Land, where they turn to Edwin (pretending to be the Royal Dentist) for help.
22. "I Can Do It Better" – Apollo and Sweetpea Sue end up competing each other in different games in order to be the best at everything. When Apollo and Sweetpea Sue continue to compete against each other, Cowbella and Squacky turn to Hank and Frank for help.
23. "Mind Your Manners" – The Pajanimals are told by their mom that their grandma is coming over for breakfast tomorrow morning and that they must use their best manners at the table. When the Pajanimals are unsure what would be considered good manners, they ride Cowbella's bed to Storybook Land, where the Pajanimals turn to Edwin (pretending to be a king) for help at the time when he is hosting a royal banquet.
24. "Accidents Can Happen" – Cowbella is told by her mother to try potty training again following her last "accident". She accidentally wets herself when she doesn't make it to the bathroom in time. Then, Cowbella ends up getting sad and ashamed after having another accident. To help Cowbella solve the problem, the Pajanimals ride Squacky's bed to the Big Blue Sea, where they turn to Granny Pearl for help.
25. "Joy to the World" – The Pajanimals are celebrating Christmas. Squacky really hopes he gets the new Fantastic Splash Super Sub and is so excited that he cannot sleep. The Pajanimals ride Apollo's bed to the Night Sky where they turn to The Moon (wearing Santa Claus's hat) for help.
26. "Pajanimal Dance Party" – The Pajanimals get ready quickly way before bed and decide to have a dance party before bed. During bed, they end the night differently by singing their signature song, "La La Lullaby".

== Broadcast ==
On August 30, 2012, it was announced that ABC and TVNZ had picked up Australian and New Zealand broadcast rights.

The show premiered in the United Kingdom on Nick Jr. on September 23, 2013, where the series was redubbed with British voice actors.

On November 11, 2013, the series was pre-sold to TVB in Hong Kong, and TVOntario in Canada.

== Merchandise and marketing ==
On September 30, 2011, a fast-food deal with Chick-Fil-A was announced.

On February 3, 2012, the Jim Henson Company signed various merchandising deals, including a home media deal with NCircle Entertainment for DVDs, and Tomy for toys. Additional merchandising partners were announced on October 12, 2012.

=== Cancelled live show ===
On November 14, 2012, The Jim Henson Company announced Pajanimals Live - Pajama Playdate, a live-show theater adaptation of the show produced by Red Light Management that would begin touring in March 2013, and then embark on a 50-city tour.

On February 15, 2013, weeks prior to the first showing, a cancellation was announced, but no reason was given.

== Reception ==
A Common Sense Media review says "This soothing series combines delightful tales and melodic songs to give families the opportunity to relax and unwind before diving into bedtime routines".
