= Jeff Muncy =

American television producer and toy designer (born 1963)

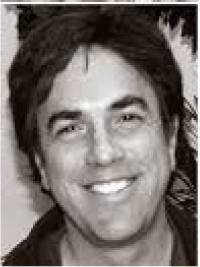
- Born: Jeffrey Allen Muncy; March 12, 1963 (age 62); Van Nuys, California, U.S.
- Occupation(s): Creator of Pet Alien, Milo the Millennium Bug, Pajanimals, Psyclops and EYEdentify Art
- Spouse: Sadaf Cohen Muncy

Jeffrey Allen Muncy (born March 12, 1963) is an American television producer and toy designer. In 2004, the animated series Pet Alien was created based upon Muncy's popular toy line and book of the same name. The series was picked up internationally by Cartoon Network. Muncy has since focused his career on creating and developing animated film and TV projects. He was the creator and executive producer on the series Pajanimals, which was produced by The Jim Henson Company and PBS Kids Sprout.

Shortly after October 2022, Muncy began a line of cyclops NFTs under the name EYEdentify Art.

Muncy remains active in his interest in toy creation and pajama designing, as creator and co-founder of the Psyclops brand of collectible toys and accessories.
