= Big City Park =

- Genre: Children's television
- Created by: Colin Williams
- Country of origin: United Kingdom
- Original language: English
- No. of series: 2
- No. of episodes: 30

Production
- Running time: 14 minutes
- Production companies: Sixteen South; BBC Scotland

Original release
- Network: BBC
- Release: 2 August 2010 – 3 January 2012

Big City Park is a live-action television puppet show, aimed at preschoolers and shot on location in Ormeau Park, Belfast, Northern Ireland. The series urges children to explore nature and the outdoors. Created, written and produced by Colin Williams, the series was broadcast on Cbeebies for two seasons between 2010 and 2012. Big City Park was a co-production of Sixteen South with BBC Scotland.

== Premise and production ==
Big City Park is a children's show that aims to get children outdoors and rediscover the awe and wonder of nature. The show features Billy, a badger, Dara, a fox and a troll called Ruairi, who all live in the park - along with their human friend, May the park keeper.

It was a BBC featured show for August 2010 and rated very highly with over 24% of the audience. It peaked with an audience share of 341,000 on 20 August with an average of 244,000 across the series. It was the second most watched show in its slot on CBeebies during August 2010 and the first show attracted 19,000 viewers on BBC iPlayer alone.

== Cast and characters ==
May (played by Sarah McCardie), a kind-hearted and beautiful young lady who works as the park keeper at the Big City Park and acts as a host throughout the episodes. She lives in a house and likes to smell the flowers. So far, she's the only human character alongside the little boys and girls who varied across the nature settings. She also has a habit of falling asleep whenever she gives Billy a taste of her own medicine and wherever she's first to wake up thanks to her animal friends, mainly Dara.

Billy (voiced and performed by Josh Elwell), a mischievous but friendly and cheerful seven-year-old badger and Ruairi's best friend who loves animals and having fun in the park where he lives. He enjoys playing jokes on everyone he meets and sometimes tries to outsmart Dara only to be foiled every time.

Dara (voiced by Alana Kerr Colins and performed by Lesa Gilespie), a plucky eight-year-old fox who is tomboyish and streetwise and likes to make friends with a lot of people. She enjoys outsmarting Billy the table is turned and is a good friend of May.

Ruairi (voiced and performed by Paul Corrie), a fun-loving and wise troll who speaks with a Norwegian accent and is a gentle giant due to a fact he's a biggest puppet character you've ever met. He resides in a garden hut at the park where he's also Billy's best friend and is good at telling stories about many different creatures from across the world and other Norwegian mythology.

== Episodes ==
Episode Number	Title
1	May’s First Day
2	Everyone Can Sing
3	It’s Hot Hot Hot
4	Captain Billy
5	Woodland Workout
6	Sounds of the Park
7	Follow the Signs
8	Henry Hedgehog
9	I Want to Grow Bigger
10	Ruairi Day
11	Splash
12	Quest for the Chest
13	A Load of Rubbish
14	A Magic Carpet Ride
15	Happy Birthday May
16	Up in the Trees
17	Tall Tales
18	A Den for Dara
19	Rain Can Be Fun
20	Making Music is Easy
21	Making Things Grow
22	Summer Holiday
23	Ruairi’s Little Friend
24	Big Windy Park
25	Outfoxed by a Fox
26	A Special Friend Visits

== Awards ==
- BAFTA Scotland for Best Children's Series - 2011
- IFTA Award for Best Youth/Children's programme, Ireland - 2011
- Silver Plaque - Hugo Award, Chicago - 2011
- CINE Golden Eagle - 2011
- Commended - Celtic Media Festival – 2011
