= Pinkalicious & Peterrific =

Animated children's TV series

- Genre: Children's television series; Educational; Fantasy
- Based on: Pinkalicious by Victoria and Elizabeth Kann
- Voices of: Kayla Erickson; Jaden Waldman; Molly Lloyd; Jayce Bartok
- Theme music composer: Belinda Ward
- Opening theme: "It's a Pink Feeling"
- Ending theme: "It's a Pink Feeling" (instrumental)
- Countries of origin: United States; United Kingdom
- Original language: English
- No. of seasons: 7
- No. of episodes: 84

Production
- Executive producers: Dorothea Gillim; Victoria Kann
- Running time: 25 minutes
- Production companies: Sixteen South; WGBH Kids

Original release
- Network: PBS Kids
- Release: February 19, 2018 – December 3, 2025

Pinkalicious & Peterrific is an animated children's educational television series on PBS Kids, based upon the Pinkalicious book series by Victoria and Elizabeth Kann (Elizabeth being the coauthor of Pinkalicious and Purplelicious). The series is produced by GBH Kids in association with Sixteen South.

The series premiered on February 19, 2018, with its first season of 38 episodes. PBS Kids announced the renewal of the series for a second and third season in October 2019. The second season premiered on March 30, 2020 and ended on December 7, 2020. The third season premiered on June 18, 2021 and ended on January 12, 2022. A fourth season was later announced, which premiered on September 26, 2022. Ahead of its season four premiere, PBS Kids renewed the series for a fifth season with 7 episodes and sixth and seventh seasons each with 6 episodes. The fifth season premiered on February 13, 2023, the sixth season on February 12, 2024, and the seventh season on February 10, 2025.

== Overview ==
Designed to encourage preschool-age children to explore the arts and develop their creativity, Pinkalicious & Peterrific follows the adventures of Pinkalicious and her brother Peter as they imagine how the world looks through her artful eye. Each episode consists of two 11 minute stories, including an interstitial live-action segment and an original song.

== Characters ==
=== Main characters ===
- Pinkalicious Pinkerton (voiced by Kayla Erickson in seasons 1–3; Shazdeh Kapadia in season 4–7): An imaginative young girl who likes pink more than any other color, in addition to soccer, painting, tinkering, and using her creativity.
- Peter Pinkerton (voiced by Jaden Waldman in seasons 1–3; Logan Nicholson in season 4–7): Pinkalicious' younger brother. He likes riding his scooter, playing with blocks and tagging along on Pinkalicious' adventures. He has some angst over being the youngest, as evidenced in "No Honking" in his song, "Music to Me".
- Pearl Pinkerton (voiced by Kerry Butler in season 1; Molly Lloyd in mid-seasons 1–3; Katie Ryerson in season 4–7): Pinkalicious and Peter's mother and inventor.
- Perry Pinkerton (voiced by Jayce Bartok in seasons 1–3; Jonathan Tan in season 4–7): Pinkalicious and Peter's father who often gives them advice.

=== Supporting characters ===
- Jasmine Cooper (voiced by Daia Jade Johnson in seasons 1–3; Ava Augustin in season 4–7): Pinkalicious and Peter's friend. She has curly black hair in bunches held by yellow ribbons. She likes the color yellow in addition to playing the recorder.
- Lila Goodway (voiced by Raleigh Shuck): Pinkalicious and Peter's friend. She has brown hair braided in twintails; she dresses in purple and plays soccer. She is a member of Pinkalicious' clique, but unseen hanging out with them often due to her shy nature. She is sensitive, as shown in "Slumber Party" (missing her mom at the eponymous party) and in "Peter's Blues" (getting discouraged after Peter sings about her missing the net in soccer).
- Kendra Klee (voiced by Echo Picone in seasons 1–3; Emma Ho in season 4–7): Pinkalicious' friend. She has straight shoulder-length black hair and wears dark clothing. Her favorite color is black (the only one not to have pink as favorite color). She often makes sarcastic comments towards others but usually before she comes through in the end and goes along with Pinkalicious' ideas.
- Rafael Martinez (voiced by Justice Quiroz in seasons 1–3; Roman Pesino in season 4, S5E1 and S6E1–S6E2; Niko Ceci in S5E2-S5E7 and S6E3): Pinkalicious and Peter's friend, whose mother is Mayor Martinez (and he has a dog named Rusty). He likes to paint; even though he and Pinkalicious don't always agree, they're still friends.
- Frida Martinez (voiced by Nicole Ruiz in seasons 1–3; Alyssa Gervasi in season 4–7): Peter's friend and Rafael's younger sister.
- Mayor Martinez (voiced by Rebecca Soler in seasons 1–3; Veronica Hortiguela in season 4–7): The mayor of Pinkville and Rafael's mother.
- Mrs. Plum (voiced by Blanca Camacho): In the episode "Drawing Noses", her first name is revealed to be Richanda.
- Mr. Plum (voiced by Ezra Knight)
- Gertie (voiced by Marlo Thomas in season 1; Deborah Hay in season 6): Lila's stuffed pink dragon.
- Ms. Penny (voiced by Erin Fritch in seasons 1–3; Brittany Banks in season 5–7): The teacher at Pinkalicious' school.
- Mr. Crunk (voiced by Chris Philips in seasons 1–3; Murray Furrow in season 4–7): The vice-principal at Pinkalicious' school, who thinks art is useless and also a waste of time.
- Penelope/Garbage Woman (both voiced by Brittany Johnson)
- Goldie (voiced by Molly Lloyd): Pinkalicious' imaginary unicorn.
- Mr. Schuster (voiced by Jayce Bartok): The shoe salesman.
- Norman (voiced by Chuck Lewkowicz in seasons 1–3; Ian Ronningen in season 5–7): A garden gnome living in Pinkalicious and Peter's backyard.
- Alexis Jackson-Goodway (voiced by Addison Holley): Lila's older half-sister on whom who Rafael has a crush.
- Iris Iverson (voiced by Maria Nash): Pinkalicious' new friend, introduced in season 4, who loves the color lime green and is into music and singing.

== Episodes ==
=== Series overview ===
Season	Episodes	Originally released	
Season	Episodes	First released	Last released
1	38	February 19, 2018	December 5, 2019
2	13	March 30, 2020	December 7, 2020
3	10	June 18, 2021	January 12, 2022
4	4	September 26, 2022	September 29, 2022
5	7	February 13, 2023	October 6, 2023
6	6	February 12, 2024	October 9, 2024
7	6	February 10, 2025	December 3, 2025

=== Season 1 (2018–19) ===
No. overall	No. in season	Title	Original release date	Prod. code
1	1	"Fairy House/Pinkabotta & Peterbotta"	February 19, 2018	101
Fairy House: Pinkalicious wants to see the Springtime Fairies this year! When her and Peter find them, they allow the fairies to stay at their house. But soon, they move to the forest to live in a fairy house. Pinkabotta & Peterbotta: Pinkalicious and Peter have made a robot called Robotta that can do anything! When she malfunctions, they have to stop her before she makes a mess of the whole house! That's Artalicious!: Inspired by Pinkalicious, Peter, and Kendra making a fairy house, kids decide to gather natural materials and make their own fairy house.
2	2	"Slumber Party/Puptastic"	February 20, 2018	102
Slumber Party: Pinkalicious is having a Princess of Pink Slumber Party, and Jasmine and Lila are invited! Lila gets cold feet, and wants to go home, but her friends help her have courage with Gertie the dragon. Puptastic: The Pinkertons are pupsitting the Plums' poodle named Pinky! But when it's bathtime, they accidentally turn Pinky the color pink! That's Artalicious!: Inspired by the Princess of Pink Slumber Party, kids decide to dress up and be anything, including princesses!
3	3	"Invisible Band/Best Pink Present"	February 21, 2018	103
Invisible Band: The Pinkville Marching Band is in town, but they have caught the Whiffling Sneezes! Pinkalicious and her friends come up with their own marching band with invisible instruments! Best Pink Present: It's Harry's birthday, and Pinkalicious wants to make him a present! But, she can only make the wrapping paper with her creative ideas! When her dad gets home, he thinks it's the best present ever! That's Pinkatastic!: A man named Phil shows off something he thinks is pinkatastic, a Zoosmobile, which is half bike and half musical instrument!
4	4	"Dancing Shoes/No Honking"	February 26, 2018	104
Dancing Shoes: Pinkalicious gets magic shoes that can make a person magically dance! But, how will she get them off? These dancing shoes sure don't wanna come off! No Honking: Peter loves his horn on his scooter! When he makes up a scooter song, nobody wants to listen to it, because they think it's just noise! However, Pinkalicious realizes that her and her family didn't listen, and that noise can be music. That's Pinkatastic!: Kids decide to show off something they think is pinkatastic, tap dancing!
5	5	"Sand Palace/Zoo Day"	February 27, 2018	105
Sand Palace: It's the Sandcastle Building Competition, and Pinkalicious wants to make a sand palace! When she runs out of time, will she be able to make the sand palace of her dreams? Zoo Day: It's the Teddy Bear Picnic at the Pinkville Zoo! But when the Pinkertons get lost thanks to a mischievous monkey, how will they get to the Teddy Bear Picnic in time? That's Pinkatastic!: Leo Sewell decides to show off something he thinks is pinkatastic, junk sculpting!
6	6	"Plantastically Pink/Painting Pixie"	February 28, 2018	106
7	7	"Pinkalicious/Glitterizer"	March 5, 2018	107
Pinkalicious: Pinkalicious eats too many pink cupcakes, and gets Pinkitis! While being pink might have seem fun for a while, she turns red and decides to eat green food to help turn her back! Glitterizer: Pearl has made a new invention called the Glitterizer! Pinkalicious decides to secretly test it out for her, but it turns out that wasn't the best idea. That's Pinkatastic!: Victoria Kann decides to show off something she thinks is pinkatastic, how she made the Pinkalicious and Peterrific books!
8	8	"All Tangled Up/Above the Clouds"	March 6, 2018	108
9	9	"Snow Fairy/To Catch a Leaf"	March 12, 2018	109
10	10	"Peter's Blues/Pink Raspberry"	March 19, 2018	110
11	11	"Pink Lemonade/Pink Shoes"	May 14, 2018	111
12	12	"Gnome More Nonsense/Space Dancing"	May 15, 2018	112
13	13	"Indoor Camp-In/The Flutterbugs"	May 16, 2018	113
14	14	"Secret Sculpture/The Celebrator"	May 17, 2018	114
15	15	"Sweet Pea Pixie/Pink Piper"	May 18, 2018	115
16	16	"Cha-Cha-Licious/Show and Smell"	July 30, 2018	116
17	17	"School Rules/That Unicorn Feeling"	August 6, 2018	117
18	18	"Garden Gnome Party/Scooter Boy"	August 13, 2018	118
19	19	"Missing Squeakykins/The Cloud-O-Matic"	August 20, 2018	119
20	20	"Dream Salon/The Duck Stops Here"	August 27, 2018	120
21	21	"Pink or Treat/Berry Scary"	October 22, 2018	123
22	22	"Sidewalk Art/Gnome at Home"	October 23, 2018	121
23	23	"Don't Wake Norman/Pinkasaurus"	October 25, 2018	122
24	24	"Pink Love/Duocorn"	February 11, 2019	127
25	25	"Monkey Dance/Royal Peacock Dance"	February 12, 2019	124
26	26	"Star Light, Star Not So Bright/The Opera-Matic"	February 13, 2019	125
Star Light, Star Not So Bright: Pinkalicious and Peter find a star in their backyard and decide to keep it as a pet! But, the star starts to dim, and they have to get it back in the sky. The Opera-Matic: Pearl has made an Opera-Matic for Mrs. Plum's birthday! While on their way to the Plums', Pinkalicious accidentally breaks the Opera-Matic! How will she and Peter tell their mom?
27	27	"Fashion Fun/Welcome Pinka Bear"	February 15, 2019	128
28	28	"Peterrific/Mother's Day Surprise"	May 6, 2019	131
29	29	"Face Painting/Sailing Away"	May 7, 2019	126
30	30	"Lost Voice/Doll Hospital"	May 8, 2019	130
31	31	"Best Day Ever/Catchy Song"	May 9, 2019	132
32	32	"Jumping for Joy/The Pinkatoo"	August 6, 2019	133
33	33	"Knights of the Pink Table/Music Mix Up"	August 7, 2019	134
34	34	"Whale of a Song/Pinkabubbles"	August 8, 2019	136
35	35	"Amazing Sled Run/Frost Fairy"	December 2, 2019	135
36	36	"Drawing Noses/Pinkalicious On Ice"	December 3, 2019	129
37	37	"A Real Hoot/Amazing Tower of Igloos"	December 4, 2019	138
38	38	"The Legend of Pinkfoot/Flossie the Mossling"	December 5, 2019	137

=== Specials (2019–24) ===
==== A Pinkaperfect Birthday ====
The first TV special aired on August 5, 2019. In the special, Pinkalicious receives a wand on her birthday that makes everything in Pinkville pink, but not everyone loves what she did. So she and Peter go on a quest to find out how to use the wand to turn everything back to normal.

==== Cupid Calls It Quits ====
The second TV special aired on February 8, 2021. In the special, Cupid decides to quit his job and cancel Valentine's Day until further notice, leaving Pinkalicious and Peter to fill in for him and bring back the holiday.

==== A Pinkerton Family Vacation ====
The third TV special aired on June 10, 2024. In the special, the Pinkertons take a family road trip to see the Pink Wonders of the World, but end up making a wrong turn and getting lost in Beigeville.

=== Season 2 (2020) ===
No. overall	No. in season	Title	Original release date	Prod. code
39	1	"A Birthday Party for Kendra/Norman Plans A Playdate"	March 30, 2020	201
40	2	"Aqualicious/Sing in the Spring"	March 31, 2020	202
Aqualicious: Pinkalicious and Peter meet a merminnie named Aqua, and they need to find out where she lives! Pinkalicious also wants to find out what Aqua's favorite shade of blue is. Is it sky blue, indigo, aqua, or something else? Sing in the Spring: Fairyanna and her pals have come down with the fairy flu, and now they can't sing in the spring! When they enlist Pinkalicious and Peter's help, they accidentally bring sing in the spring, but not in the right places! That's Artalicious!: The kids decide to paint pictures using watercolors.
41	3	"Mr. Socko/A Pinkapurrfect Pet"	April 1, 2020	203
42	4	"Yodelahee Goat/Pink Mascot"	April 2, 2020	204
Yodelahee Goat: Flora the farmer has lost her goat Greta, and Greta is very good at hiding! Pinkalicious and Peter want to help find Greta, but trying to find a runaway goat is harder than they think! Pink Mascot: Pinkalicious and her soccer team decide they need a mascot: the pinkatoo! They need to find someone to be their mascot though, and Peter thinks he's up for the job! Will he be the mascot as a pinkatoo? That's Pinkatastic!: Nate Ball teaches kids about something he thinks is pinkatastic, beatboxing!
43	5	"The Sparkle Kart/The Pinkville Merry-Go-Round"	April 3, 2020	205
The Sparkle Kart: Pinkalicious, Peter, and Kendra are having a go-kart race! But when Kendra's go-kart breaks, what will they do? They combine the Dart Kart and the Sparkle Speedster, that's what! The Pinkville Merry-Go-Round: Mayor Martinez has ordered the new merry-go-round, but it only came with a bench! Will the gang be able to find things that are creative and able to ride?
44	6	"Invasion of the Flutterbugs/Ballet of the Bells"	June 8, 2020	206
45	7	"Treasure Hunt/Cheer Up, Archie"	June 9, 2020	207
46	8	"Pinkapolka Dotty/Lila Gets Glasses"	June 10, 2020	208
47	9	"Invisible Ink/Rusty's Doghouse"	September 14, 2020	209
48	10	"Petercadabra/Sleepless in Pinkville"	September 15, 2020	210
49	11	"Spoon Sounds/Robotta the Artiste"	September 16, 2020	211
50	12	"A Fairy Thanksgiving/Pinkfoot Playdate"	November 16, 2020	212
51	13	"Gingerbread House/Christmas Tree Trouble"	December 7, 2020	213

=== Season 3 (2021–22) ===
No. overall	No. in season	Title	Original release date	Prod. code
52	1	"Butterfly Garden Party/Animal Dance"	June 18, 2021	301
53	2	"Peter's Portrait/Pink Peepers"	June 18, 2021	302
54	3	"The Monster Trap/The Search for Peter's Whistle"	June 18, 2021	303
55	4	"Peter's Pet/Cupcake Calamity"	October 11, 2021	304
Peter's Pet: Rosie has been acting like she likes Peter more than Pinkalicious! Pinkalicious thinks that if she acts like Peter, Rosie will like her! But is this really true? Cupcake Calamity: Mr. Swizzle has a new creation, the Cupcake Create-o-Matic! However, it suddenly breaks down! The kids try and fix it, and Pinkalicious gets the cupcake she wants in a REALLY big way! That's Artalicious!: Inspired by Mr. Plum's secret sculpture, kids make their own game called Frozen Statues. (Repeat of The Celebrator/Secret Sculpture)
56	5	"Paintbrush Boy and Pencil Girl/Save a Tree"	October 12, 2021	305
57	6	"Fishtastic/The Pink Ness Monster"	October 13, 2021	306
58	7	"Robotta's Singing Delivery Service/The Rhyme Off"	October 14, 2021	307
59	8	"The Secret Life of Henrietta/Photographer Peter"	January 10, 2022	308
60	9	"Pirate Dreamboat/Peter's Megaphone"	January 11, 2022	309
61	10	"Friendship Bracelets/The Upside Down O Matic"	January 12, 2022	310

=== Season 4 (2022) ===
No. overall	No. in season	Title	Original release date	Prod. code
62	1	"The New Girl/Mission Pink"	September 26, 2022	401
63	2	"Walking Tall/Go With the Flow"	September 27, 2022	402
64	3	"Princess Pinkalicious/Switcheridoo"	September 28, 2022	403
65	4	"Parrot Watch/Disappearing Act"	September 29, 2022	404

=== Season 5 (2023) ===
No. overall	No. in season	Title	Original release date	Prod. code
66	1	"Snow Alarm/The Pinkest Reward"	February 13, 2023	501
67	2	"Giganto Powder/The Extraordinary Art Experience"	February 14, 2023	502
68	3	"Pinkminster Dog Show/Do-Over Ray"	February 15, 2023	503
69	4	"Gnome Variety Show/Tidy Up"	October 3, 2023	505
70	5	"Color of the Year/Toothy McManners"	October 4, 2023	506
71	6	"Mommy Gnome/Bon Appetit"	October 5, 2023	507
72	7	"Yo-Yo's Musical Journey/Happy Pinkville Day"	October 6, 2023	504

=== Season 6 (2024) ===
No. overall	No. in season	Title	Original release date	Prod. code
73	1	"Dojo Mojo/Googly Eyes"	February 12, 2024	601
74	2	"A-Maze-Ing Day/Pet Sitting Service"	February 13, 2024	602
75	3	"The Kendra Shuffle/Team Song"	February 14, 2024	603
76	4	"Fairy Button Exchange/Pink Pong Program"	October 7, 2024	604
77	5	"Pinkville Rocks/Case of the Giggles"	October 8, 2024	605
78	6	"Pinkfoot Has Hiccups/Doodles"	October 9, 2024	606

=== Season 7 (2025) ===
No. overall	No. in season	Title	Original release date	Prod. code
79	1	"Peter's Flying Bed/Holiday Day"	February 10, 2025	701
80	2	"Hot Air Marooned/Oozy Does It"	February 11, 2025	702
81	3	"Give It a Whirl/Peter Makes Up His Mind"	February 12, 2025	703
82	4	"Peter the Picky Eater/Miniature Mayhem"	December 1, 2025	704
83	5	"Night of 1000 Stars/Scavenger Hunt"	December 2, 2025	705
84	6	"The Pinkville Time Capsule/Pinkerstition"	December 3, 2025	706

== Merchandise ==
=== Books ===
To promote the series, books in the Pinkalicious series, published after the show's premiere, invite readers to watch Pinkalicious & Peterrific on PBS Kids.

=== Magazines ===
Redan's Sparkle World magazine, aimed at 3-9 year olds, featured Pinkalicious & Peterrific-related content, alongside other characters for girls including Shopkins, My Little Pony, and more.
