= Lily's Driftwood Bay =

British-Northern Irish animated series by Sixteen South

- Genre: Animated cartoon series
- Created by: Colin Williams
- Directed by: Colin Williams and Darren Vandenburg (Season 1); Tim Harper (Season 2)
- Voices of: Peter Mullan; Orlagh O’Keefe; Annette Crosbie; Tameka Empson; Ardal O'Hanlon; Jane Horrocks; Stephen Fry; Richard Dormer; Paul Currie
- Music by: Score Draw Music
- Countries of origin: United Kingdom; Ireland
- Original languages: English; Italian; Irish
- No. of seasons: 3
- No. of episodes: 100

Production
- Editor: Brian Philip Davis (Season 1)
- Running time: 7 minutes
- Production company: Sixteen South

Original release
- Network: Nick Jr.
- Release: 5 May 2014 – 15 October 2017

Lily's Driftwood Bay is a Northern Irish animated children's television series. Produced in Northern Ireland, the series premiered on Nick Jr. in the UK and Ireland on 5 May 2014 and it ended on 5 November 2017. It is created and produced by Sixteen South in association with Ingenious Media and with the participation of Nick Jr. and KiKA for season 2. It is based on some original artwork by Joanne Carmichael. The show uses paper cut-out animation.

== Plot ==
A young sea-treasure hunter named Lily and her Dad live in a beach hut on an otherwise deserted beach. They give the impression of a family living 'off grid' with their patched clothes and Dad's plain look - their transport is an old van, and Lily having only a seagull for friendship and most of her toys composed of 'sea treasure' found on the beach.

In episode 35 "Goodbye Seabird" Lily is presented a framed photograph, from her father, showing a slightly younger Lily, her father and a blonde-haired lady by her father's side. The episode deals with the death of a seabird on Driftwood Bay and a suggestion could be that Lily's mother recently died given that Lily appears only a couple of years younger in the photograph.

== Characters ==
=== Main ===
- Salty Dog (voiced by Peter Mullan) is a Scottish dog and the captain of a boat called "Delilah". He is Nonna's younger brother who lives on Driftwood Bay. His catchphrases are "All aboard for Driftwood Bay!", "Land ho!", "Aye, aye, young Lily!", "Welcome aboard, Old Delilah!", "Golden goose caps!", "Moldering mudskippers!", "Lumbering lobsters!", "Rattling razor-clams", and "Slippery scallions!" Salty takes Lily to Driftwood Bay on Old Delilah. Salty seems to be in love with Hatsie Hen.
- Lily (voiced by Orlagh O’Keefe) is the protagonist of the series, an imaginative, happy-go-lucky, cheerful, and feisty young 5-year-old Northern Irish red-headed girl with a vivid imagination. Lily is always accompanied by her best friend, Gull (a Seagull) who often spies "sea treasure" that is washed up on the shore by her beach hut. Once Lily finds the sea treasure, she wonders what it could be, and gets whisked away to Driftwood Bay, an island that exists only in her imagination. During the title sequence, Lily creates pictures of her animal friends with things that have washed up on the beach, which come to life on Driftwood Bay. Her catchphrases are "Sea treasure!", "Every day, a new adventure washes up on the beach!", "Hoop-dee-doo!", "Hooray!", "Across the way on Driftwood Bay!", "Come on, Gull!", "Aye, aye, Captain Salty!", and "What is it, Gull?"
- Bull Dozer (voiced by Ardal O'Hanlon) is an Irish bull who wears a red neckerchief (or scarf) and lives on Driftwood Bay.
- Nonna Dog (voiced by Annette Crosbie) is a Scottish dog who is Salty's older sister and the owner of the Cockle Cafe on Driftwood Bay.
- Hatsie Hen (voiced by Tameka Empson) is a train-driving English hen who wears goggles at great speed and Salty seems to be in love with. She lives on Driftwood Bay.
- Wee Rabbit (voiced by Jane Horrocks) is a Welsh rabbit who wears a pink dress and lives on Driftwood Bay. She is shy and loves art.
- Lord Stag (voiced by Stephen Fry) is an English stag who wears a head reflector and lives in Stag Castle on Driftwood Bay.
- Dad (voiced by Richard Dormer) is Lily's Dad who loves her and stays at home, always there when she returns from her adventures.
- Gull (voiced by Paul Currie) is Lily's best friend who is a seagull and is very squawky and talkative.
- Puffin (voiced by Paul Currie) as his name implies, is a puffin who lives on Driftwood Bay.

=== Special guests ===
- Noleen Hen (voiced by Dolly Parton) is a famous American country singer/songwriter and guitarist who gets washed up in a storm on Driftwood Bay. She appears in the episode "The Salty Chicken".
- Dredger Tom Fox (voiced by Rob Brydon) is the antagonist of the series. Tom is a seafaring Welsh silver fox who is Nonna's former childhood sweetheart. He appears in the episode "The Proposal".
- Roweena Rabbit (voiced by Imelda Staunton) is Wee Rabbit's sister who appears in "Fabulous Darling".

== Episodes ==
Series	Episodes	Originally released	
Series	Episodes	First released	Last released
1	52	5 May 2014	6 December 2014
2	48	7 August 2017	15 October 2017

=== Season 1 (2014) ===
No.	Title	Directed by	Written by	Australian release date
1	"Honking Haddock"	Unknown	Sam Barlow	19 May 2014
Salty is getting ready for lunch with Hatsie, and splashes on some of his old Honking Haddock aftershave. When Lily tries to explain that he smells terrible, he refuses to listen.
2	"Old Bertha"	Unknown	Sarah Daddy	20 May 2014
Lily finds a paintbrush washed up on the beach and learns that Salty is planning to paint and repair Bertha, his old boat. When he's called away, Lily gathers her friends to lend a hand.
3	"Stop That Pudding!"	Unknown	Sharon Miller	21 May 2014
Lily finds a set of measuring spoons, which she puts to good use. Nonna needs to rest, so Salty steps in to cook an important pudding, but things soon go wrong.
4	"Puffin Muffins"	Unknown	Chris Baugh	22 May 2014
Lily finds a whisk on the beach and takes it to Nonna's baking class. Nonna is a tricky teacher, who likes things done exactly how she says, and soon doesn't have many pupils left.
5	"Starfish In The Sky"	Unknown	Sam Barlow	23 May 2014
When Lily finds a piece of pipe on the beach, she imagines it to be a telescope. When Salty tells her about the Starfish Constellation, Lily is determined to see it for herself.
6	"All at Sea"	Unknown	Sarah Daddy	24 May 2014
Lily finds a piece of cloth, and imagines that it could be from a carnival. On the way there, the wind stops blowing and Lily and Salty are stranded at sea.
7	"Silly Seals"	Unknown	Simon Nicholson	25 May 2014
Salty gives Lily a ball from the Shiphouse store and they make up a new game; Lily sees a mysterious blue rock out at sea. Salty doesn't believe Lily. Everyone is surprised when it returns.
8	"Pirate Puffin"	Unknown	Sarah Daddy	26 May 2014
Lily finds a pirate's scarf and searches for treasure; Puffin seems like an ideal shipmate, so Lily swaps Puffin and Gull for the day, but Puffin is much harder work than Lily expects.
9	"Harbour Cookies"	Unknown	Sharon Miller	27 May 2014
Lily finds a cookie cutter on the beach and decides that it would be fun to open a cookie stall at the Driftwood Bay harbor. She doesn't however anticipate the effect her new business will have on poor Nonna.
10	"Seaweed Pie"	Unknown	Simon Nicholson	28 May 2014
A wooden spoon washed up on the beach inspires Nonna to cook her famous Seaweed Pie. Salty leads Lily on a Golden Seaweed hunting expedition, but ends up trapped by the incoming sea.
11	"Runaway Stag"	Unknown	Tom Stevenson	29 May 2014
After a hint from Gull, Lily finds a sculpting tool on the beach. The tool sends her on a magical journey. Wee Rabbit receives a commission from Lord Stag to build a massive statue.
12	"Snippy"	Unknown	Sam Barlow	30 May 2014
Lily stumbles upon a glass jar that has been washed up on the beach. Salty suggests that the jar could be great for rockpool dipping. Lily discovers a hermit crab named Snippy and they become friends.
13	"Splatball"	Unknown	Tom Stevenson	31 May 2014
Lily finds Delilah's winch handle washed up on the beach, and as a reward Salty gives Lily a ball from the Shiphouse Store. When it gets soggy, Lily and Gull invent a new game called Splatball.
14	"Thar She Blows"	Unknown	Sam Barlow	1 June 2014
Lily spots a big mysterious blue rock out at sea. Salty didn't see it and thinks Lily was seeing things. This makes Lily determined to prove to Salty that it does exist. Featuring the song "No Place Like Sea" with music by Alan Menken and lyrics by Stephen Schwartz.
15	"Rescue"	Unknown	Chris Baugh	2 June 2014
Lily finds an old compass washed up on the beach that proves useful when Bull seems to be in trouble up on the Great North Cliff.
16	"A Bee in a Million"	Unknown	Sarah Daddy	3 June 2014
Lily finds a napkin on the beach. It's just the thing for the Driftwood Bay picnic, and Lily finds Bull talking to his friend, Bee. When Bee vanishes, Lily helps Bull find him.
17	"Time Out"	Unknown	Sharon Miller	4 June 2014
Lily finds a relaxing wind chime washed up on the beach. Meanwhile, Driftwood Bay is the busiest it has ever been and poor Hatsie and her Clickety-Clackety Train are working very hard.
18	"The Mystery Key"	Unknown	Unknown	5 June 2014
Lily finds an old key washed up on the beach and sets sail for Driftwood Bay to find its owner. After following a trail, which leads her all over the island, Lily finally finds the key's rightful home in an unexpected place.
19	"Logbook Lookout"	Unknown	Lizzie Ennever	6 June 2014
Salty's precious logbook has gone missing. It's where he wrote down everything that happened. All the evidence points to Puffin being the culprit.
20	"The Carnival"	Unknown	Chris Baugh	7 June 2014
Lily finds a little hoop washed up on the beach, which is just perfect for the Driftwood Bay Carnival. Lily and Bull decide to see how many prizes they can win.
21	"Windy Things"	Unknown	Simon Nicholson	8 June 2014
A washed-up ribbon inspires Lily to teach Salty how to fly a kite. After one-too-many disasters, Lily learns that Salty is more confident at sea and comes up with a plan to help.
22	"The Dance-Off"	Unknown	Tom Stevenson	9 June 2014
Lily finds a pair of rusty old spoons, which Salty teaches her to play. Lord Stag challenges Salty to a dance-off at the Driftwood Bay Ceilidh, but Salty's dancing legs are a little tired.
23	"Message in a Bottle"	Unknown	Lizzie Ennever	10 June 2014
It's Gull's birthday and Lily finds a bottle washed up on the beach with a clue inside it. Following the clues on Driftwood Bay leads Lily and Gull to the best birthday ever.
24	"Stop! Watch"	Unknown	Tom Stevenson	11 June 2014
Lily finds Salty’s precious old pocket watch washed up on the beach and promises to look after it for him. But, the watch is snatched from Lily’s hand by the passing Clickety-Clackety Train, resulting in a chase all over Driftwood Bay to track it down.
25	"The Being Helpful Badge"	Unknown	Simon Nicholson	12 June 2014
When a shiny badge is washed up on the beach, Lily realizes that it's actually a special award for being helpful. Bull has wanted one for a long time.
26	"Bedtime Scarf"	Unknown	Unknown	13 June 2014
Bull has lost something special, his precious bedtime scarf. An upset Bull is a crash-banging-bonkers Bull, so Lily leads the hunt, searching for Bull's missing bedtime scarf.
27	"A Very Important Visitor"	Unknown	Sharon Miller	12 November 2014
A fun moustache and glasses disguise is washed up on the beach. Over on Driftwood Bay, Lord Stag is disappointed when his important guest can't come to visit.
28	"A New Arrival"	Unknown	Sam Barlow	13 November 2014
A baby sheep is born on in Driftwood Bay, but Lily is disappointed when everyone quickly snaps up all the gifts from the General Store, leaving her empty-handed.
29	"Plastic Iceberg"	Unknown	Tom Stevenson	14 November 2014
Lily and Salty discover the biggest lump of pollution they have ever seen.
30	"Little Flying Light"	Unknown	Chris Baugh	15 November 2014
Lily and Bull get very lost on a camping trip when they follow a little flying light.
31	"The Monster Of Wild Rocks"	Unknown	Simon Nicholson	16 November 2014
Lily and Wee Rabbit are terrified when they hear a terrible monster at Wild Rocks.
32	"Storm-a-Coming!"	Unknown	Sara Daddy	17 November 2014
A barometer warns of a bad storm on its way to Driftwood Bay.
33	"Summer Holiday"	Unknown	Unknown	18 November 2014
The whole island is heading to Lord Stag's beach house for some summer fun.
34	"Bulls Might Fly"	Unknown	Unknown	19 November 2014
Bull gets more than he bargained for when he gives Lord Stag a hand.
35	"Goodbye Seabird"	Unknown	Unknown	20 November 2014
Bull discovers that his old seabird friend, Razorbill has died. Everyone gathers to remember their old friend; Wee Rabbit is terrified when her silly picture of Salty is whipped up in the wind. The episode ends with Lily's father giving her a framed photograph depicting her father, a lady and a slightly younger Lily. All are standing in close proximity and posing as in a typical family portrait. The episode might suggest that Lily's mother died relatively recently due to Lily being only a couple of years younger in the photograph. Featuring the song "Someday" with music by Alan Menken and lyrics by Stephen Schwartz.
36	"Catch That Picture!"	Unknown	Tom Stevenson	21 November 2014
Wee Rabbit is embarrassed when her picture of Salty makes everyone laugh.
37	"A Slippery Customer"	Unknown	Simon Nicholson	22 November 2014
On Driftwood Bay, Lily invites a friendly seal to the Cockle Cafe and uses the pencil she found on the beach to take his order.
38	"A Sheepy Situation"	Unknown	Sam Barlow	23 November 2014
Lily and Bull are having fun playing chase until they leave the gate of the sheep field open. With sheep causing havoc all over Driftwood Bay, Lily and Bull must own up, and help round up those sheep.
39	"Help!"	Unknown	Sharon Miller	24 November 2014
Hatsie is too proud to ask for help when she gets stranded out at sea.
40	"Funny Fluffy Things"	Unknown	Sam Barlow	25 November 2014
Bull's juicy dandelions are replaced by funny fluffy things that get blown away.
41	"Captain Lily"	Unknown	Lisa Akhurst	26 November 2014
Lily becomes a captain when she and Gull get stranded on Delilah out at sea.
42	"Dance Date"	Unknown	Unknown	27 November 2014
A terrible mix up leaves Salty thinking that Hatsie already has a date to the dance.
43	"Shush, Puffin!"	Unknown	Unknown	28 November 2014
Puffin knows why precious objects are vanishing, but no one is listening to him.
44	"Fiddlin' Flatfish"	Unknown	Lizzie Ennever	29 November 2014
With Salty missing his old band, Lily puts together a brand new lineup.
45	"Whale Rescue"	Unknown	Unknown	30 November 2014
Lily and Salty free a baby whale who shows his gratitude in an amazing way.
46	"Delivery Disaster"	Unknown	Simon Nicholson	1 December 2014
Things don't go to plan when Nonna takes over Hatsie's deliveries for the day.
47	"Next Please!"	Unknown	Sharon Miller	2 December 2014
Lily discovers that running the General Store is not as easy as it looks.
48	"Remembering Grampy"	Unknown	Lisa Akhurst	3 December 2014
A knotted rope piece washes up on the beach. Something is on Salty's mind, and Lily tries to find out what it is. She discovers that it's a special day for his father when she asks him if everything is okay.
49	"Winter Games"	Unknown	Sara Daddy	4 December 2014
It's snowing in Driftwood Bay. Bull wants to win a medal like one that Lily has.
50	"Snowy Sheep Chase"	Unknown	Unknown	5 December 2014
Salty thinks that a snowstorm is coming. He and Lily put the sheep away. However, one escapes into the storm.
51	"Christmas Kerfuffle"	Unknown	Sharon Miller	5 December 2014
Everyone is preparing the Cockle Café for a celebration when disaster strikes.
52	"All Aboard!"	Unknown	Unknown	6 December 2014
It's a sleepy day on Driftwood Bay and Lily, Gull, Dad, Juilet decides to make some music with a small xylophone she finds on the beach. This episode features "Driftwood Bay (The Best Friends Song)" with music by Alan Menken and lyrics by Stephen Schwartz.

=== Season 2 (2017) ===
No.	Title	Directed by	Written by	TVO Kids release date
1	"Runaway Boat"	Unknown	Unknown	7 August 2017
Bull decides to become adept at navigating the ocean like Salty, so he sets sail across the island in Bertha, Salty's dry-docked boat.
2	"Say Cheese"	Unknown	Unknown	8 August 2017
Lord Stag decides to commission a portrait of himself to hang in the Stag family gallery. When he sends away his enthusiastic friends and sees his lonely portrait on the wall, he realises the true value of friendship.
3	"Clarissa"	Unknown	Unknown	9 August 2017
Salty's boat Delilah is showing her age and Lily is shocked to learn that Salty is replacing her with a brand new, high-tech vessel. The new boat proves much trickier to handle than Salty expected and, when a disaster occurs, Salty has to call on faithful old Delilah to save the day. Delilah is the only boat for Salty.
4	"Songs of the Sea"	Unknown	Unknown	10 August 2017
Lord Stag is hosting a spectacular concert on board Delilah. The sea, however, proves far too rough and the concert is a disaster. Lord Stag is devastated until Lily arranges an ocean-concert on dry land, using the dry-docked Bertha.
5	"The Cuttlefish Cup"	Unknown	Unknown	11 August 2017
Salty and Lord Stag enter very different vessels into a round-the-island boat race. Lord Stag is certain that engine power will win the day - until he runs out of fuel. Salty, in his wind-powered craft, must sacrifice victory to help his fellow sailor.
6	"Old Grampy River"	Unknown	Unknown	14 August 2017
Lily and Sally find themselves getting lost on an unfamiliar stretch of river on the opposite end of Driftwood Bay.
7	"My Fair Hen"	Unknown	Unknown	15 August 2017
Hatsie decides that she needs help to become a little more refined and Lord Stag is happy to give her lessons in being posh. The new Hatsie, however, is impossible to understand and everyone agrees that they prefer unrefined Hatsie, just as she is.
8	"The Houseguest"	Unknown	Unknown	16 August 2017
When Lord Stag needs somewhere to stay, Salty reluctantly invites him to the Shiphouse Store. Lord Stag proves to be an incredibly demanding house guest with some outrageous requests. Salty loses patience with his new lodger and soon their friendship is in tatters. Lord Stag offers to help Salty repair an old winch and, in doing so, repairs their relationship.
9	"Under New Management"	Unknown	Unknown	17 August 2017
Lily recruits Lord Stag to help run the Cockle Cafe. However, this decision doesn't go down too well with Nonna.
10	"The Wanderin' Walrus"	Unknown	Unknown	18 August 2017
Lily and Salty discover a very important ship sunk in the waters near Driftwood Bay. The Wandrin' Walrus was the ship that brought the islander's ancestors.
11	"Rockpool Roulade"	Unknown	Unknown	21 August 2017
Nonna is attempting to cook a very special recipe. Her memory, however, is failing and, though she won't admit it, Nonna struggles to remember the ingrediants. Lily steps in to help jog Nonna's memory in a very unusual way!
12	"Halibut Howler"	Unknown	Unknown	22 August 2017
A fierce wind rips through the island and everyone must take shelter under the General Store. When Wee Rabbit doesn't come to the shelter, Salty and Lily must venture out, into the wind, to find her.
13	"Spanner in the Works"	Unknown	Unknown	23 August 2017
Nonna's pipes need repairing and Salty, being a loyal brother, pledges to fix them for her. Salty's plumbing skills, however, are not up to much and things are soon erupting in a catastrophic way.
14	"Flying Felicity"	Unknown	Unknown	24 August 2017
Lord Stag takes his old motor car the Flying Felicity out for a spin. However, his terrible driving leaves a lot to be desired.
15	"Oil Spill"	Unknown	Unknown	25 August 2017
Salty over-oils his old winch, inadvertently causing a terrible oil slick in his beloved ocean and, even worse, endangering Puffin! The island pulls together to rescue their seabird friend.
16	"Big Puffball"	Unknown	Unknown	28 August 2017
Muddy Bull is told to leave the café until he can clean himself up; Lily gives Bull a full, fancy makeover; Bull's friends find his new image funny and laugh at him.
17	"Peace and Quiet"	Unknown	Unknown	29 August 2017
Salty is taking Hatsie for a peaceful picnic. He plans to play her a little song that he's written about his special hen. Lily, however, misunderstands Salty's wishes and decides to supply some music of her own, much to Salty's displeasure!
18	"Wooly Jumpers" "Woolly Jumpers"	Unknown	Unknown	30 August 2017
Lily finds a whistle. Bull enters Lightning the Sheep into the annual Driftwood Bay sheep race. However, Lightning is too fast and he can't catch him. Bull is unable to catch his sheep Lightning so he disguises himself as one. Stag puts antlers on his ewe.
19	"Parker"	Unknown	Unknown	31 August 2017
Lily and Gull follow Salty on a wild adventure deep beneath the waves of the ocean in his old, trusty submarine.
20	"Haddock Haul"	Unknown	Unknown	1 September 2017
The town's annual Haddock Haul contest becomes a big mess when accusations of cheating are raised by rival teams.
21	"Drip Drip Drip"	Unknown	Unknown	4 September 2017
There is heavy rain at Driftwood Bay. Bull decides to help Noona fix her leaking roof, yet it's much harder than he had thought.
22	"Farewell Puffin"	Unknown	Unknown	5 September 2017
It's time for Puffin to leave the bay in order to join the other migrating seabirds. Salty struggles to say goodbye.
23	"Nurse Bull"	Unknown	Unknown	6 September 2017
Bull is convinced that Salty is ill. Along with Lily and Gull, he takes it upon himself to nurse Salty back to health.
24	"The Great Staggerini"	Unknown	Unknown	7 September 2017
Lord Stag's lunchtime piano session is losing its spark among the Bay's residents. Lily brings some magic to his act.
25	"Rise and Shine"	Unknown	Unknown	8 September 2017
Lily and Salty are out on a day trip to the beach. Lily raises an alarm to the whole island when she thinks Salty is in trouble.
26	"Monster Bash"	Unknown	Unknown	11 September 2017
Lord Stag invites everyone to his monster themed party, however Lily and Bull's game goes too far when they scare the host.
27	"Potty Parsley"	Unknown	Unknown	12 September 2017
Lily is so enthusiastic that she overfeeds Nonna's parsley. Soon, the Cockle Cafe kitchen turns into a jungle.
28	"Fishing for Dandelions"	Unknown	Unknown	13 September 2017
Bull is upset when his precious dandelion collection floats out to sea. The whole island gather to help get them back.
29	"Fire!"	Unknown	Unknown	14 September 2017
Lily and Bull accidentally starts a fire with a magnifying glass on a hot summer's afternoon. It quickly accelerates to an emergency.
30	"Mumsie"	Unknown	Unknown	15 September 2017
Lord Stag is very excited when he gets news of his mother coming for a visit. However, she proves to be a very tricky visitor.
31	"Lost in the Garden"	Unknown	Unknown	18 September 2017
Lily and the other islanders are lost in Lord Stag's overgrown ornamental garden. They wonder if they'll ever find the way out.
32	"The Daily Driftwood"	Unknown	Unknown	19 September 2017
Lord Stag is publishing Driftwood Bay's very own newspaper. Bull is determined to dominate the front page, but the perfect scoop is hard to find.
33	"Beached"	Unknown	Unknown	20 September 2017
After seeing a whale washed up on the beach, Bull and Lily spring into action. They draw up plans to help get it back into the sea.
34	"Celestial Surprise"	Unknown	Unknown	21 September 2017
Salty is determined to see the most spectacular sight the island has ever seen: the celestial sunrise. The friends want to go with him, but he is in a hurry.
35	"Wee Rabbit, Big Voice"	Unknown	Unknown	22 September 2017
Stag is auditioning singers for his musical soiree. None of the auditionees are quite right - until Lord Stag hears the most perfect voice in the distance. Lily and Gull track the mystery operatic voice down to a most surprising source.
36	"Sea Mist"	Unknown	Unknown	25 September 2017
The Driftwood Buccaneers need to find a way to get back safely and quickly, after they lose their way home in a sea mist.
37	"Bootcamp"	Unknown	Unknown	26 September 2017
As part of her agenda to make everyone fit, Nonna hosts a cross country run, but Lord Stag and Bull devise a cunning plan to avoid it.
38	"At Your Service"	Unknown	Unknown	27 September 2017
Bull decides to volunteer to be Lord Stag's butler for his grand dinner party, which leads to lots of chaos.
39	"Guiding Light"	Unknown	Unknown	28 September 2017
Puffin lands in trouble and gets stuck on a rock, so Salty heads into a dangerous storm in order to help his friend before it gets too dark.
40	"Paper Lanterns"	Unknown	Unknown	29 September 2017
Lily thinks she might be getting too old to play her imaginative games and, for once, doesn't sail to Driftwood Bay. She stays with Dad who tells her all about his childhood.
41	"Mr. Parrot"	Unknown	Unknown	2 October 2017
Lily and Lord Stag stumble across a talking parrot that ends up creating some terrible confusion on the island.
42	"Home"	Unknown	Unknown	3 October 2017
A pair of homeless and desperate penguins arrive on the island to find somewhere safe and warm to have their baby penguin. When they can't find anywhere suitable, they need a friendly stranger to help them.
43	"St. Scallion's Day"	Unknown	Unknown	4 October 2017
It's St Scallion's Day, when Driftwood Bay celebrates its history. Everyone dresses up and tells the story of the journey of The Wanderin' Walrus in one long wonderful song.
44	"Fabulous Darling"	Unknown	Unknown	5 October 2017
When Wee Rabbit's sister comes to stay, Wee Rabbit feels the need to be just as flamboyant as her sibling. Featuring Imelda Staunton.
45	"Costa Del Stag"	Unknown	Unknown	6 October 2017
Lord Stag announces ambitious plans to develop Driftwood Bay into a busy, brash tourist resort with hotels, airports and fast food outlets. The Driftwood Bay community is outraged and tries to change his mind.
46	"Christmas Crashed"	Unknown	Unknown	8 October 2017
Lord Stag's festive light show brings Santa crashing onto the island on Christmas Eve. Shaken from his bad landing, Santa is too nervous to fly and the island are overjoyed to have him all to themselves.
47	"The Salty Chicken"	Unknown	Unknown	12 October 2017
A glamorous visitor tries to tempt Salty away from Driftwood Bay for a life of fame and fortune. Featuring special guest star Dolly Parton.
48	"The Proposal"	Unknown	Unknown	15 October 2017
When Nonna's former friend Tom happens to be visiting, the old love between the two ignites and they decide to marry without further ado. Featuring special guest star Rob Brydon.

== Home video history ==
- UK
  - Abbey Home Media Group (2016)
- USA
  - NCircle Entertainment (2016)

== Broadcast ==
The series premiered on Universal Kids in the United States on 12 May and on ABC in Australia on 19 May 2014. In Ireland, it airs on RTÉ. It used to air on Channel 5 - Milkshake! in the UK, Piwi+ in France in August 2016. In Canada it was broadcast on Family Jr. on September 3, 2016, then season 2 aired on TVO Kids in August 2017.
