= Pet Alien =

French-American animated television series

- Genre: Slapstick; Comedy; Science fiction comedy Absurd comedy Screwball comedy
- Created by: Jeff Muncy
- Developed by: Dan Danko; Josh Fisher; Tom K. Brown; Bill Schultz; Jeff Muncy; Sadaf Cohen Muncy; Andrew Young
- Directed by: Andrew Young
- Voices of: Charlie Schlatter; Charlie Adler; Jess Harnell; Candi Milo
- Theme music composer: Michael Tavera (season 1); Charles Brissette and Thomas Armbruster (season 2)
- Opening theme: "Flight of the Bumblebee" (season 1) "On Pet Alien!", performed by Charles Brisette, Jeffrey Gunn, Thomas Armbruster, Vangie Gunn and Kara Balch (season 2)
- Ending theme: "Flight of the Bumblebee" (instrumental; season 1) "On Pet Alien!" (instrumental; season 2)
- Composers: Michael Tavera (season 1); Noam Kaniel (season 2)
- Countries of origin: United States; France; Ireland; India (season 1); Germany (season 2)
- Original languages: English; French
- No. of seasons: 2
- No. of episodes: 52 (104 segments)

Production
- Executive producers: Bill Schultz; Jeff Muncy; Sadaf Cohen Muncy; Nicolas Atlan; Christophe di Sabatino; Anish H. Mulani; Paul Cummins; Mike Young; Liz Young; Sebastian Debertin (season 2, eps. 14-26); Marc Gabizon (season 2, eps. 14-26)
- Producers: Siobhán Ní Ghadhra; Cary Silver (season 1)
- Running time: 22 minutes (11 minutes per segment)
- Production companies: Mike Young Productions; Antefilms Production (season 1); Crest Communications (season 1); JadooWorks (season 1); Telegael Teoranta; Europool (season 2); MoonScoop (season 2)

Original release
- Network: TF1/Télétoon (France); Cartoon Network/Animania HD (U.S.)
- Release: November 20, 2004 – 2007

Pet Alien (French: Alien Bazar) is an animated television series created by Jeff Muncy, with episodes written by Dan Danko and directed by Andrew Young. The series is a co-production between Mike Young Productions of the United States, Antefilms Production of France, Crest Communications and JadooWorks of India and Telegael Teoranta of Ireland, in association with John Doze Studios, with the participation of TF1, in co-production with Télétoon (France) and distribution by Taffy Entertainment. For Season 2, KI.KA and Europool in Germany and MoonScoop in France joined as co-production partners. It is loosely based on the 1990s toyline of the same name.

It aired on Cartoon Network and Animania HD in the United States and TF1 and Télétoon in France. 52 episodes were produced, resulting in 104 segments.

== Synopsis ==
The series centers on the life of young, 13-year-old teenager Tommy Cadle, whose life is turned upside-down after his lighthouse is accidentally crashed into and invaded by a cast of a variety of five aliens during the night. Despite whatever trouble they all seem to cause, Tommy is content with having them around, as they brighten up his mundane life. This pleases the aliens, especially since most of them would prefer to stay. As such, the episodes revolve around the crazy antics and misadventures Tommy has to endure from his mischievous alien guests and the chaotic world around him as he attempts to live life normally.

== Characters ==
=== Main characters ===
- Tommy Cadle (voiced by Charlie Schlatter in English and David Scarpuzza (season 1) and Hippolyte de Poucques (season 2) in French) - He was once a normal kid who had no cares in the world and did well in school until the aliens came along. Tommy is often bullied by some of the other kids at school because of the aliens' actions and is annoyed by them, but generally accepts them as part of his life and sees Dinko as his best friend.
- Dinko (voiced by Charlie Adler in English and Frédéric Meaux in French) - A moody, upbeat, welcoming, strongly energetic and charismatic green Pterodactylus-like alien who is the leader and brains of the alien gang, and Tommy's self-proclaimed best friend, whom he adores and does everything for to remain such. He and Gumpers always try to help Tommy, but they always muck things up, often because they misunderstand Tommy's words to the point of insanity. Dinko is the most mesmerized by Earth's ways, words and rituals, and is naturally the most eager and curious of them all. However, even though he is the most innocent and friendly of the group, he will also often go to extreme, obsessive measures to solve his curiosity, causing no small amount of trouble and pestering for Tommy in the process.
- Gumpers (voiced by Jess Harnell in English and Michel Hinderyckx in French) - A big, strong, gluttonous, but easily scared pink gorilla-like alien with a big appetite who doesn't know his own strength. He appears to be extremely dumb most of the time, but he is capable of flashes of intelligent thoughts if he strains his brain hard enough. He and Dinko try to help Tommy with his problems, but they always mess things up and cause a bigger issue. Sometimes, Gumpers will point out the flaws in Dinko's plans, but Dinko never listens to him and does what he wants instead.
- Swanky (voiced by Jess Harnell in English and Franck Dacquin in French) - A British-accented blue insect-like alien that is the most refined and sophisticated of the gang. As his name suggests, he is rude, egotistical, lazy, quasi-elegant, very self-centered, arrogant, pretentious and greedy. He is also the one who is the most disinterested in everyone else in the group, and rarely accompanies Tommy and the aliens on their wacky adventures. He enjoys fancy things, massages and drinking tea, and wants to steal Tommy's room all for himself.
- Flip (voiced by Charlie Adler in English and Jean-Pierre Denuit in French) - An energetic purple parrot-like alien with red hair. The biggest troublemaker of the alien gang, his speech is often unintelligible, incoherent, incomprehensible babbling gibberish (with only the last few words being normal), and he is often used for comedic relief and slapstick, as he loves to play tricks on the others, especially Swanky. In season 2, he begins to talk normally.
- Scruffy (voiced by Bruno Georis in French) - Dinko's pet. Scruffy resembles a dog with purple fur and has a long, muscular tongue.

=== Major characters ===
- Gabby (voiced by Candi Milo in English and Lorette Goose in French) - A Mexican girl who is extremely obsessed with and in love with Tommy, often to the extent of being a stalker and a nuisance, but unfortunately he does not feel the same way. In several episodes, it is revealed that she can smell when Tommy is in trouble. In season 2, she mellows out significantly and befriends Tommy and the aliens, and Tommy is more willing to (platonically) hang around her.
- Granville DeSpray (voiced by Jess Harnell in English and Delphine Moriau in French) - A pompous eccentric and the British direct descendant of DeSpray Bay's founders, and as such he values old English traditions like teatime. Granville is hopelessly in love with Melba and has numerous times, to no avail, attempted to win her heart or impress her, sometimes via acting street and displaying "hip-and-hop". He despises Tommy and always hatefully blames him for anything bad that happens.
- Clinton Fillmore Jefferson XIII (voiced by Charlie Schlatter in English and Didier Colfs in French) - Clinton competes in any kind of sports available and usually wins. He is also a strong bully who likes to annoy, hurt, scapegoat and make fun of others, including Tommy, on a constant basis.
- Melba Manners (voiced by Candi Milo in English and Béatrice Wegnez in French) - A spoiled, bratty, authoritarian, possessive girl next-door who is the arch-enemy of Tommy. She enjoys forcing him to do tedious or tiresome tasks thanks to her terrifying temperament, shouts his name whenever something goes wrong (often through no fault of his own) and has a loud and shrill voice.
- Cap'n Spangley (voiced by Charlie Adler in English and Arnaud Léonard in French) - A quick-rambling old sailor who is a little crazy and greedy. His experience as a captain was a traumatic one, however, as he is apparently afraid of water and crustaceans. He runs a taffy shop which Tommy (and the aliens) visits often and sometimes works at.

=== Minor/recurring characters ===
- Tommy's Mom (voiced by Candi Milo) - A nagging woman who lives in a house located near to Tommy's lighthouse. She never appears onscreen, keeping contact with her son solely through PA loudspeakers installed in Tommy's lighthouse bedroom.
- Old Man Bitters (voiced by Charlie Schlatter) - Cap'n Spangley's angry archenemy who enjoys fishing.
- Emperor Breet (voiced by Candi Milo) - An evil, terrifyingly demonic, yellow-eyed emperor from the planet Rootsmell who journeys to Earth to kidnap the aliens living with Tommy now and then. Unfortunately, he always loses the right to take them in a game he isn't very clever at, and therefore despises: musical chairs.
- Doctor Daffodil (voiced by Charlie Adler) - An octopus-like alien that Dinko and his friends consult whenever Tommy needs a doctor. Unfortunately, his methods can be highly dangerous and Tommy therefore tries to evade him as much as possible.
- Tommy's Teacher (voiced by Candi Milo) - She usually appears in some episodes that revolve around school. In one episode, she gave Tommy his first B− for his inflated hand and degraded it to a C+ when the hand shrunk and to a C− when his leg inflated.
- Mom-sicle and Pop-sicle (voiced by Candi Milo and Jess Harnell) - Swanky's redneck parents.
- The Mime - A mime that tries to enter the lighthouse, but is always stopped by Flip.
- The Frog - A banjo-playing frog that appears in some episodes, often as intermission for a new scene or a gag.

== Production ==
In the early-to-mid 1990s, Jeff Muncy thought to create a line of stuffed alien plushes under the branding "Pet Alien". The concept originally started with just keychains and plushies distributed by the Best Ever Company, as a premium item to be sold in gift shops and boutiques nationwide. The keychains sold very well, but would later evolve into somewhat of a story by the late 1990s and early 2000s at the request of his sales representatives. Muncy self-published a picture book under the branding, subtitled "The Most Special Place", and around the same time, a website was made to promote the brand, complete with a storefront.

The brand's direction made it clear that Dinko was the main alien of the lot; the website also hosted a trilogy of cartoon Flash-animated shorts with him in the spotlight, among three other alien pals. These were done around the year 2000 by Muncy under his John Doze Studios label, and animated by Flinch Studio, operating today as MightyPants Media. The second of the webtoons' files were rendered inaccessible when the website was retooled, but can be viewed in snippets and stages of production at Flinch Studio's original website.

In its prototypical origins, Muncy clearly intended for the property to be targeted at young children, going by the basic art structure and storylines. His original idea of the cartoon had a different, more serialized premise than the more contemporary, traditionally episodic comedy the series ultimately became. One theme is that the aliens were meant to land in Tommy's backyard and take refuge in his treehouse, forcing Tommy to have them be a secret from the "Big Union of Galaxies", plus more aliens which were exclusively included as part of his original toyline. The pre-show variant of the website additionally came with backstories for the characters (i.e. Dinko is currently on the run from scientists who would like to dissect him, Flip likes to run on comets and shooting stars, Scruffy is from a planet of dog creatures). This shift in format is especially noticeable in season 2, which sanded off a lot of the quirkier aspects and worldbuilding of the first season and carried a much more lighthearted tone.

The series was originally going to be picked up by Disney, an executive for which approached the brand at a book signing for Puzzle Zoo in Santa Monica, California after being attracted by a display window featuring the characters, but on the sole condition that it was retooled to appeal to toddlers. Muncy rejected the deal and pitched the show to the independent animation distributor and studio Mike Young Productions (known today as Splash Entertainment) instead, who approved it in its current state. According to Muncy, Young allowed for more creativity and a better vision for his show, a frantic, slapstick-heavy, character-focused, Tex Avery/Looney Tunes-inspired, fast-paced screwball comedy. Dan Danko and Tom K. Mason were brought on to develop the project.

The show was first confirmed to be in production as early as April 2002, with a slightly older audience in mind than the shorts. In October 2002, the show's production partners were announced. Alongside Mike Young and its future owner, French studio MoonScoop, India-based Crest Animation and JadooWorks, and Abú Media and Telegael from Ireland would also be involved, with Crest handling most of the animation for the first season and Abú Media handling post-production and distribution. Europool and KI.KA out of Germany would also assist in the production for season 2. Much of these companies assisted in other Mike Young products of the era, such as Code Lyoko, ToddWorld, and Jakers! The Adventures of Piggley Winks, and would remain close partners for many years to come. The series immediately got development support from Dominque Poussier of France's TF1, Mark Wilson and Brian Hughes of the United Kingdom's GMTV, and Finn Arnesen, Bob Higgins and Terry Kalagian of the United States' Cartoon Network, who showed great interest when they were presented with it and immediately bought it. A sneak peek of the series was first shown off at MIPCOM in October 2002.

Eric Stein, vice president of licensing and merchandise at Mike Young Productions and Taffy Entertainment, believed the series had potential as a multimedia franchise and got deals with various companies for forms of tie-in merchandise licenses: American Marketing Enterprises for sleepwear, Berkshire for accessories, Jay Franco for domestics, JEM Sportswear for t-shirts and sweatshirts, SG Footwear for footwear, Baby Boom Consumer Products for cuddle pillows, Beverly Hills Teddy Bear Co. for gift and specialty market plush, Children's Apparel Network for apparel, Fast Forward for bags and backpacks and Mello Smello for stickers. However, outside of the stuffed animals based on Tommy and the aliens, a video game, and an obscure line of Burger King toys, most of the proposed merchandise never came to fruition.

Similar to some other low-budget shows, the series uses only four famed voiceover actors; Charlie Schlatter, Charles Adler, Jess Harnell and Candi Milo. This is commonly a cost-cutting measure; more voice actors means more voice-over people to pay, so studios will often limit the cast to have, at most, four or five available at all times. Harnell was also the voice director of the show and voiced three characters: Gumpers, Swanky and Granville.

== Broadcast ==
After a short test-run in various foreign broadcasting markets beginning in late 2004, the series first premiered in the United States on Voom HD's Animania HD channel on November 20, 2004 at 7:00 PM, followed by TF1 in France on January 3, 2005 (airing on the channel until 2010), Cartoon Network on January 23, 2005 at 10:00 AM in a middle-morning Sunday slot, and on the same network in the United Kingdom the following day at 5:30 PM, ending the first season's run on August 21 the same year despite some decent ratings initially, particularly on its British airwaves. Supposedly, it would be the first Cartoon Network show to share a launch globally, with all their channels and markets across the world acquiring the pay-TV rights to the series (including the U.S., U.K., Latin America, Europe, Japan, Asia Pacific, Denmark, Hungary, Italy, Norway, Poland, Romania, Spain, and Sweden). Executive producer and Mike Young Productions/Taffy Entertainment principal Bill Schultz stated that "From the start, Pet Alien was created with Cartoon Network's irreverent audience in mind. In addition to the slapstick physical comedy, the series has attitude and a strong point of view–which we hope will make it highly appealing to the network's millions of discriminating cartoon aficionados around the world."

The series did fare better in Europe, however, and on October 4, 2005, it was renewed for a second season. American cable subscribers could still get the show through the Kabillion on demand network by around early 2007; before it was almost relegated exclusively to their website by the second half of the year after the first few months. The series was rebroadcast on Télétoon from December 2005 to 2017, and on Gulli from August 2009 to 2014. It was broadcast in its entirety on the FVOD channel Mango, and was available on the Molotov TV platform. In Germany, the series was broadcast on Super RTL.

Since the second season was never broadcast in the U.S. initially, the sources for episode dates and timeline for when the show ends are poorly documented and have conflicting information; only production dates for the episodes are entirely known. Some sites state that all of season 2 was aired daily throughout May 1 to May 26, 2005, concurrently with the first season, which is conflicted by various articles and copyright info in the credits, which date the episodes to 2006 ("The Creature Who Left" - "The Beast That's Stuck in My Foot") and 2007 ("The Black Eye of Doom" - "Hammy of Earth!"). Other sources claim that the final episode aired as late as January 12, 2011, also in conflict with the series' credits. Presumably, this might have to do with the series entering digital distribution. The series would eventually return to U.S. television in 2017 through the Qubo network, and aside from a year-long removal in 2019, would continue to air until the channel's closure in 2021. It can currently be streamed on Amazon Prime Video, Plex, Netflix, and YouTube.

== Series overview ==
Season	Episodes	Originally released	
Season	Episodes	First released	Last released
1	26	November 20, 2004	2005
2	26	2006	2007

== Episodes ==
=== Season 1 (2004–05) ===
Pet Alien season 1 episodes
No. overall	No. in season	Title	Written by	Original release date
1	1	"The Boy with Six Legs" "Evil Emperor"	Bryan Thompson Tom Shepard	November 20, 2004
1a: After Tommy rushes to take the trash out after oversleeping, he puts on Swanky's robe and later gets accidentally locked out of the lighthouse by the aliens when in desperate need of shelter, and decent clothes. During this, a misleaded crab enters his lighthouse and lands right on the answering machine, and much of the aliens mistake the crab as a transformed Tommy. Swanky fancies himself a feast despite this.
2	2	"The Amazing Atomic Tommy" "Crater of Doom"	Dan Danko and Tom K. Mason	January 30, 2005
2a: Dinko believes Tommy is actually a grand superhero after he performs a magic trick pulling a coin out of his nose, and when he sees that exact event described on a superhero show on TV. Swanky observes this, and has his own greedy interest by thinking of Dinko as some sort of money-cow – or alien, playing the role of a supervillain. Note: This episode is included in the DVD volume Atomic Tommy. 2b: Note: This episode is included in the DVD volume Lighter Side of Doom.
3	3	"Attack of the 50 Foot Boy" "It Came from the Closet"	Kat Likkel and John Hoberg Ray DeLaurentis	February 6, 2005
4	4	"The Bride of Gumpers" "The Thing on the Corner"	Dan Danko and Tom K. Mason	February 13, 2005
4a: Note: This episode is included in the DVD volume Spaced Out. 4b: Dinko befriends and soon becomes obsessed with Tommy's mailbox after Tommy won't play with him. Note 1: This episode, alongside several others (such as "Attack of the Werescruffy" and "The Creature of DeSpray Bay") contains a reference to Geppetto from Pinocchio, with him searching for "a boy with a wooden nose". Note 2: This episode is included in the DVD volume Aliens Unleashed.
5	5	"I Was a Teenage Bearded Boy" "Escape from Detention X"	Japhet Asher (story), Dan Danko and Tom K. Mason (writers) Dan Danko and Tom K. Mason	January 23, 2005
5a: Note: This episode is included in the DVD volume Atomic Tommy.
6	6	"Box of Doom" "Assault of a Rodent"	Dan Zettel Ray DeLaurentis	February 26, 2005
6a: The aliens find a jumpy box offshore, which they fear could be the titular "Box of Doom". Whilst that's happening, Tommy is in search for another box full of Norwegian jumping beans to find and retrieve for Cap'n Spangley. There's also a subplot where Granville believes the box contains a gift for Melba, so he passes whatever's in it as his own. Note 1: This episode contains a reference to The Shining, when Gumpers says "Here's boxy!" after the "box of doom" lands back in front of the aliens. Note 2: This episode is included in the DVD volume Lighter Side of Doom.
7	7	"They Came from Outer Space" "Tentacles of Terror"	Dan Danko and Tom K. Mason	February 27, 2005
Note: This episode is included in the DVD volume Spaced Out
8	8	"The Great Movie Massacre" "The Day That Wouldn't End"	Dan Danko and Tom K. Mason Dan Danko and Tom K. Mason (story and writers), Doug Molitor (story)	March 5, 2005
8a: Tommy tries to make a movie. 8b: As the title would suggest, a miserable case of Monday bad luck affecting Tommy keeps on repeating in an almost never-ending loop. Note: This episode is included in the DVD volume Atomic Tommy.
9	9	"It Comes When You Sleep" "Attack of the Werescruffy"	Dan Danko and Tom K. Mason Ralph Soll	March 6, 2005
10	10	"Sounds of Doom" "Darkness"	Don Gillies	March 12, 2005
Note: This episode is included in the DVD volume Lighter Side of Doom.
11	11	"She Comes for Your Heart" "Beast Who Stole My Heart"	Dan Danko and Tom K. Mason Don Gillies	March 13, 2005
11a: Dinko finds out that Tommy is going to give his friend, Gabby, his heart on Valentine's Day, and tries to stop it.
12	12	"Night of the Walking Cannonball" "It Landed on the Porch"	Dan Danko and Tom K. Mason Ray DeLaurentis	March 19, 2005
13	13	"Bay of the Triffids" "Doctor of Doom"	Dan Danko and Tom K. Mason Dan Danko and Tom K. Mason (story), Ralph Soll (writer)	March 20, 2005
13a: Note: This episode is included in the DVD volume Spaced Out. 13b: Note: This episode is included in the DVD volume Lighter Side of Doom.
14	14	"Invasion of the Balloon People" "The Little Monster Ball"	Dan Danko and Tom K. Mason	March 26, 2005
15	15	"The Land That Size Forgot" "The Day the Food Expired"	Dan Danko and Tom K. Mason Meg McLaughlin	2005
15a: In this Gumpers-centric episode, he believes the small town full of tiny people in his snow globe (which he names "Tinytopia") is real and sentient, and tries to protect it away from the no-good shakers. Swanky is most interested in uncovering its secrets, but his plans are thwarted by everyone else. He, of course, gives it a good number of shakes. Even Dinko isn't immune to the urge to shake it, as he goes nuts with the thing. Because of that, Gumpers is upset at and disappointed in Dinko, and no longer considers him a friend, leaving him distraught and full of regret. Fortunately for both of them, this grudge doesn't last long and they make amends. Note: This episode is included in the DVD volume Atomic Tommy. 15b: When the fridge is almost empty, the aliens go to extremes in trying to get more.
16	16	"The Evil That Thumbs Do" "Terror TV"	Ray DeLaurentis	2005
16a: Tommy and Swanky accidentally switch bodies.
17	17	"Bad Blood from Beyond" "The Day Time Stood Still"	Ken Pontac Ray DeLaurentis	2005
Note: This episode is included in the DVD volume Spaced Out.
18	18	"Horror Scope" "Scare Affair"	Ken Pontac Dan Danko and Tom K. Mason	2005
18b: Tommy gets the nuisance of the hiccups, and the aliens try to cure them right before his big video game tournament. Once Tommy does lose them though, the aliens have the misfortune of being afflicted. Note 1: These episodes contain references to Looney Tunes and Batman; in "Horror Scope", the scene cuts to the lighthouse in the style of the Batman television series. In "Scare Affair", Dinko ruminates on what happened to "[their] martian"; a disheveled skeleton wearing the helmet of Marvin the Martian can be seen for a second. Note 2: This episode is included in the DVD volume Aliens Unleashed.
19	19	"Stage Fright" "Night of the Cat People"	Scott Peterson Ray DeLaurentis	2005
Note: This episode is included in the DVD volume Aliens Unleashed.
20	20	"Return of the Ghastly Gobbler" "Shipping and Handling Not Included"	Dan Danko and Tom K. Mason Baz Hawkins and Micheal J. Prescott	2005
21	21	"The Boy Who Became Something..." "Unleashed Beast of Fury"	Kevin Donahue Scott Peterson	2005
22	22	"The Creature of DeSpray Bay" "The Alien Who Sold the World"	Kat Likkel and John Hoberg Don Gillies	2005
23	23	"Beware the Decider Maker" "I Voted for an Alien"	Dan Danko and Tom K. Mason	2005
24	24	"A Pirate and His Dog" "They Took Tommy's Brain"	Dan Danko and Tom K. Mason	August 20, 2005
Note: This episode is included in the DVD volume Aliens Unleashed.
25	25	"The Boy Who Ate Too Much Taffy" "The Floating Head"	Ray DeLaurentis Dan Danko and Tom K. Mason	August 21, 2005
25b: Three cheers for DeSpray Bay as Tommy is roped in to helping Melba build a float for the annual parade. Dinko fears that once the float is finished, it will take Tommy away forever!
26	26	"The Time That Time Ended" "The Day of Judgement"	Dan Danko and Tom K. Mason Ray DeLaurentis	2005
Note: This episode contains a reference to the Sorcerer's Apprentice segment of Fantasia, when Dinko wears a wizard's hat and performs magic in a way directly referencing the sequence.

=== Season 2 (2006–07) ===
Pet Alien season 2 episodes
No. overall	No. in season	Title	Written by	Original release date
27	1	"The Creature Who Left" "It Came from the Fan Club"	Dan Danko and Tom K. Mason	2006
27a: Swanky moves out of the lighthouse to move in with the royal Granville, being dubbed as the buffoon of a leader's viceroy. Swanky learns a lot from this experience, and misses the very thing that drove him away from the other aliens; a sense of fun. 27b: Tommy becomes jealous when he learns that Dinko and Gabby have formed a bond and secret fan club dedicated to their shared appreciation of him. Tommy and Gumpers also pretend to have their own fan club which they persuade the others to join, and to gain information about their secret. Both sides end up on the same predicament of wanting to be part of their respective clubs. By comedic convenience, it works out and the truth is revealed, uniting them all.
28	2	"A World Without Hamburgers" "The Evil That Pinched My Feet"	Dan Danko and Tom K. Mason Scott Gray (writer), Dan Danko and Tom K. Mason (story editors)	2006
28a: After Dinko hears the ramblings of the recurring Old Man Bitters on how much he despises junk food, he quickly adopts that ideology and decides to give it up and eat healthier, begging Tommy and the rest to do the same to the point of forcing his "healtha-tarian" lifestyle and accursed nightmare food "oatfu" onto them. Note 1: This episode contains a reference to Looney Tunes, when Dinko briefly eats a carrot à la Bugs Bunny. Note 2: This episode contains a reference to The Wizard of Oz, when Gumpers suggests when Tommy gets taken over by his own shoes to get rid of it via clicking his heels three times and saying "There's no place like home", akin to Dorothy Gale.
29	3	"The Earth Boy Who Needed Protection" "Seventy Foot Tommy"	JC Vaughn Michele Gendelman & Ursula Ziegler	2006
30	4	"Island of Doom" "Him"	Andrew Young (story), Tom K. Mason and Dan Danko (writers) Dan Danko & Tom K. Mason	2006
31	5	"The Guest Who Wouldn't Leave... Ever" "Day of the Naked Aliens"	Scott Gray (writer), Dan Danko & Tom K. Mason (story editors) Tom K. Mason and Dan Danko	2006
A try-hard Alpha Centaurian black hole master called Bob moves in as a guest because Tommy wanted to win a game of Taffimon against the pompous Granville. Note: "Day of the Naked Aliens" is the only episode to have some notable censorship. When the series aired on Qubo, the episode was omitted from their lineup and replaced with another airing of the episode "Race with the Clinton". This is speculated to be a result of all the nudity-themed jokes and innuendos, such as Tommy gesturing to his crotch while saying "naked stuff", Gumpers singing about being naked, and the ending where the entire human cast gets stripped nude.
32	6	"Master Bakers!" "The Horror That Is Klattou"	Dan Danko & Tom K. Mason Don Gillies (writer), Dan Danko & Tom K. Mason (story editors)	2006
32a: Swanky demands Gumpers to find his special purpose, which in this case means refraining from consuming the gingerbread man cookies he sees from the local bakery. Convinced that the cookies were made of real people, he tries his best to fulfill the task of protecting them. His gluttonous appetite serves a large hindrance; Tommy has to oversee Gumpers just so he doesn't mess things up further. He does succeed in this endeavor, but there's a catch to all this.
33	7	"He Walks and Talks Like an Alien" "The Night of Two Tommys +1"	Mike Rabb (writer), Tom K. Mason and Dan Danko (story editors) Tom K. Mason and Dan Danko	2006
33a: Desperate to beat Melba in a math contest, Tommy teams up with Gumpers.
34	8	"Curse of the Frozen Tommy" "Night of the Norwegian Boy"	Chris Hicks and Francis Lombard (writers), Tom K. Mason and Dan Danko (story editors) Dan Danko & Tom K. Mason	2006
34a: Tommy plays video games all night with his friends and falls asleep at school, but won't wake up. 34b: Enlisted by Granville, Gumpers plays Cyrano for him.
35	9	"Curse of the Invisible Boy" "Remote Control of Doom"	Joel Metzger (story), Tom K. Mason and Dan Danko (story editors) Nicole Feenstra (story), Dan Danko & Tom K. Mason (story editors)	2006
36	10	"They Took the Toilet to Outer Space" "This Phone. This Insanity!"	Don Gillies (story), Dan Danko & Tom K. Mason (story editors) Tom K. Mason and Dan Danko	2006
37	11	"They Had an Aluminium Ticket" "The Slo-Mo Terror"	Dan Danko & Tom K. Mason Don Gillies (story), Dan Danko & Tom K. Mason (story editors)	2006
38	12	"Trapped in the Pink Purse Dimension" "Race with the Clinton"	Joel Metzger (writer), Tom K. Mason and Dan Danko (story editors) Dan Danko & Tom K. Mason	2006
38a: Tommy and the aliens get trapped inside a purse one-by-one. 38b: Tommy enters an upcoming soapbox derby determined to beat Clinton, and swears off alien technology to build his go-kart himself.
39	13	"Big Hand of Fate" "The Beast That's Stuck in My Foot"	Danielle Evenson (story), Tom K. Mason and Dan Danko (story editors) Tom K. Mason and Dan Danko	2006
39a: Radiation from an asteroid causes Tommy to wake up with his hand having increased in large size (which Dinko likes a little too much) right before baseball tryouts, and this has a share of pros and cons. His hand also turns normal again at inconvenient times.
40	14	"The Black Eye of Doom" "The Sheriff Was an Alien"	Joel Metzger (story), Tom K. Mason and Dan Danko (script and story editors) Steven Darancette and Xandy Sussan (story), Tom K. Mason and Dan Danko (script and story editors)	2007
41	15	"Crevice of Doom" "She Came from Conforma!"	Ursula Ziegler & Michele Gendelman (writers), Dan Danko & Tom Mason (story editors)	2007
41b: Dinko orders Tommy a new robotic mother from Conforma.
42	16	"Terror in My Nose" "Belch of Destruction"	Dan Danko & Tom K. Mason	2007
43	17	"Gumpers of the Future" "Planet of the Granvilles"	Steven Darancette & Xandy Sussan (story), Tom K. Mason and Dan Danko (story editors) Andrew Young (story), Dan Danko & Tom K. Mason (writers and story editors)	2007
43b: Tommy, Dinko and Gumpers are trapped in an alternate dimension.
44	18	"The Boy Who Cried "Waaah!"" "The Cow Says "Moo!""	Ray DeLaurentis (script), Dan Danko & Tom K. Mason (story editors) Dan Danko & Tom K. Mason (writers and story editors)	2007
44a: Dinko's new hat invention designed to help Tommy expectedly leads to the opposite effect, in large part due to Dinko's selfish convictions in an effort to slow down and freeze Tommy's aging process. As the title suggests, interference caused between the metal hat and age-slower-downer accidentally turns Tommy into a baby instead of the intended outcome. An oddity of Earth bewilders the uncultured aliens.
45	19	"Duet from Another Dimension!" "The Doctor Is In... Sane!"	Dan Danko & Tom K. Mason	2007
46	20	"The Horrible Workout of Evil" "The Incredible Floating Boy"	Tom K. Mason and Dan Danko Ralph Sol (writer), Dan Danko & Tom K. Mason (story editors)	2007
47	21	"The Lookalike Girl of Evil" "Uranus Awaits"	Rick DeMott (story), Tom K. Mason and Dan Danko (script and story editors) Dan Danko & Tom K. Mason (script and story editors)	2007
48	22	"The Night My Brain Froze" "Scout's Horror!"	Tom K. Mason and Dan Danko	2007
49	23	"When TV Ruled the World" "The Thing with the Ugly Face"	Ralph Soll (script), Tom K. Mason and Dan Danko (story and story editors) Dan Danko & Tom K. Mason (story, script and story editors)	2007
50	24	"Dr. Jekyll and Mr. Swanky" "The Day That Flip Stood Still"	Tom K. Mason and Dan Danko (writers and story editors) Don Gillies (script), Dan Danko & Tom K. Mason (story editors)	2007
51	25	"When Clinton Ruled the World!" "Beware the Crack!"	Don Gillies (story), Dan Danko & Tom K. Mason (story editors) Dan Danko & Tom K. Mason (script and story editors)	2007
52	26	"The Alien Who Invaded the Taffy Shoppe" "Hammy of Earth!"	Declan O'Brien (writer), Dan Danko & Tom K. Mason (story editors) Ursula Ziegler & Michele Gendelman (story), Dan Danko & Tom Mason (story editors)	2007

== Home media ==
20th Century Fox Home Entertainment released four compilations of the series on DVD and VHS from October 18, 2005, to February 7, 2006, only in Region 1. Each compilation contained four segment-episodes from the first season.

Pet Alien home video releases
Season		Episodes	Release dates
Season		Episodes	United States
1	2005	26	Volume 1: Atomic Tommy: October 18, 2005; Episodes: "The Amazing Atomic Tommy" • "I Was a Teenage Bearded Boy" • "The Day That Wouldn't End" • "The Land That Size Forgot" Volume 2: Aliens Unleashed: October 18, 2005; Episodes: "The Thing on the Corner" • "Horror Scope" • "Stage Fright" • "A Pirate and His Dog" Volume 3: Lighter Side of Doom: December 6, 2005; Episodes: "Crater of Doom" • "Box of Doom" • "Sounds of Doom" • "Doctor of Doom" Volume 4: Spaced Out: February 7, 2006; Episodes: "The Bride of Gumpers" • "They Came from Outer Space" • "Bay of the Triffids" • "Bad Blood from Beyond"

== Video game ==
A video game based on the series was released in the United States on July 30, 2007, for the Nintendo DS handheld console. It is a puzzle game developed by Shin'en Multimedia and published by The Game Factory.

== Reception ==
The show was nominated for a Daytime Emmy Award in the category "Outstanding Performer in an Animated Program", which was Jess Harnell (Swanky), at the 33rd Daytime Emmy Awards.
