= Sixteen South =

Company that creates and produces television for children

- Industry: Entertainment
- Genre: Children's programmes
- Founded: 2007; 19 years ago
- Headquarters: Belfast, United Kingdom
- Key people: Colin Williams (Chief Exec)
- Production output: Television Production
- Brands: Pinkalicious & Peterrific; Lily's Driftwood Bay
- Website: www.sixteensouth.tv

Sixteen South is a Northern Irish and British production and distribution company that specialises in creating children's television programmes. Founded in Belfast in 2007 by Colin Williams, Sixteen South has partnered with major names in children's entertainment, co-producing shows with Sesame Workshop, The Jim Henson Company and the BBC.

The company has won more than 80 major international television awards, including a BAFTA Award, the Prix Jeunesse award, two Emmy nominations, a British Animation Award and RTS awards. In business, they have been ranked among the UK's top indie producers by Televisual and been ranked at the top of the Deloitte UK and Ireland Fast 50 in 2013.

== Television shows ==
=== Odo ===
Odo is a series about an owl named Odo who doesn’t let his small size stop him from believing in himself and trying to prove he can do whatever he puts his mind to. It was produced by Sixteen South in co-production with the Polish newcomer animation studio Letko.

=== Pinkalicious & Peterrific ===
Pinkalicious & Peterrific is an animated TV series based on the Pinkalicious series of books. It premiered 19 February 2018 on PBS Kids.

=== Lily's Driftwood Bay ===
Lily's Driftwood Bay is a 52 x 7-minute episodes, mixed media animated show for 4-6 year-olds. Season one premiered in Spring 2014 and airs around the world on the Nick Jr. Channel, Sprout (TV network), ABC, SVT, MTV3, RTÉ, HOP!, NRK, and TVO and is being sold to other worldwide territories by The Jim Henson Company. Driftwood Bay is a special island that exists in the imagination of Lily, who creates a world of adventure and friendship from treasures she finds washed up on the beach.

Lily's Driftwood Bay received the following awards:

- CINE Golden Eagle – 2015
- Best Animated Series – Hugo Television Award, Chicago – 2015
- Broadcast Awards for Best Pre-School Programme – 2015

=== Pajanimals ===
Pajanimals follows the adventures of four friendly musical puppets. Sixteen South partnered with The Jim Henson Company and PBS Kids Sprout to produce a full-length series of 52 x 11-minute episodes. Pajanimals debuted on 10 October 2011 and airs globally on Sprout, NBC Kids, Disney Junior, ABC, TVNZ, Nick Jr. Channel, TG4, and Tiny Pop.

Pajanimals received the following nominations/awards:

- Parent's Choice Recommended Seal – 2012
- Emmy nomination for Outstanding Pre-School Children's Series – 2013
- Emmy nomination for Outstanding Directing in a Children's Series – 2013

=== Big & Small ===
Big & Small is a children’s preschool show following the lives of two very different best friends named Big and Small. Sixteen South partnered with London-based Kindle Entertainment to give the show a new production home in Belfast and produce a third season which aired on CBeebies in 2011.

Big & Small received the following awards:

- BAFTA for Best Interactive Service – 2009
- RTS Television Award for Best Children's Programme – 2009
- KidScreen award for Best Writing in a Children's Programme – 2013

=== Big City Park ===
Big City Park is a 26 x 14-minute preschool show, co-produced with BBC Scotland, that’s all about getting outside and having fun – whatever the weather. It was shot in Ormeau Park, Belfast, and features Billy the badger, Dara the fox, and Ruairi the ageless creature. They all live in the park along with their human friend, May, the park keeper and host of the series. It was a BBC featured show for August 2010 and rated very highly with over 24% of the audience. It peaked with an audience share of 341,000 on 20 August with an average of 244,000 across the series. It was the second most-watched show in its slot on CBeebies during August 2010 and the first show attracted 19,000 viewers on IPlayer alone.

Big City Park received the following awards:

- BAFTA Scotland for Best Children's Series – 2011
- IFTA for Best Youth/Children's programme, Ireland – 2011
- Silver Plaque – Hugo Television Award, Chicago – 2011
- CINE Golden Eagle – 2011
- Commended – Celtic Media Festival – 2011

=== Sesame Tree ===
Sesame Tree, a version of Sesame Street made in Northern Ireland, is a children's television series produced by Sixteen South and Sesame Workshop. The first episode aired on BBC 2 in Northern Ireland on 5 April 2008 with the first series subsequently airing nationwide on BBC in August 2008. A second series was launched in November 2010 and broadcast on BBC from 22 November 2010.

Sesame Tree received the following nominations/awards:

- Winner – Hugo Television Award, Chicago – 2010
- CINE Golden Eagle – 2010
- Gold Plaque – Hugo Television Award, Chicago – 2011
- CINE Golden Eagle – 2011

=== Ivory Towers ===
Ivory Towers is a 2D-animated series about a four-year-old elephant who regularly visits her grandfather at a home for elderly animals.

=== Spaghetti Sisters ===
Spaghetti Sisters is a 2D-animated series that tells the story of two sisters in a remote mountain range and their plans to keep the family’s failing pasta restaurant afloat.

=== Sharks In Shirts ===
Sharks In Shirts is a 2D-animated series about three teenage sharks whose mischief catches up with them when a chemistry experiment goes wrong and lands them on a school’s football team for the year.

=== Super Snail ===
Super Snail is a 2D-animated series about a slug named Kevin who, despite being an administrator at a newspaper, is quite slow and often holds things up in a fast-paced news world.

=== The Coop Troop ===
The Coop Troop is a 3D CGI series revolving around a group of barnyard animals on a mission to help other animals with their problems. It is being produced by Sixteen South, Chinese company Tencent, and French studio Technicolor Animation Productions, with a release year of 2023.

== Awards and nominations ==
- 2013 – Deloitte Fast 500 EMEA Awards – 68th place
- 2013 – Deloitte Fast 50 Awards UK – 7th Place
- 2013 – Deloitte Fast 50 Awards Ireland – 2nd Place
- 2013 – Ernst & Young Entrepreneur of the Year Award – Finalist
- 2013 – Aisling Awards – Best Business – Finalist
- 2013 – Emmy nomination for Outstanding Pre-School Children's Series – Pajanimals
- 2013 – Emmy nomination for Outstanding Directing in a Children's Series – Pajanimals
- 2013 – Kidscreen Award for Best Writing in a Children's Programme – Big & Small
- 2013 – Belfast Telegraph Business Award – Best Small/Medium Business – Finalist
- 2013 – Northern Ireland’s Leaders in Business – Colin Williams
- 2012 – Belfast Business Awards – Best Creative Business – Finalist
- 2012 – Belfast Business Awards – Best Business Innovation – Finalist
- 2012 – Belfast Business Awards – Best International Trade – Finalist
- 2012 – Rated in Televisual Top 100 Indie Producers
- 2012 – Parent's Choice Recommended Seal – Pajanimals
- 2012 – Deloitte Rising Star – Technology Fast 50 Awards
- 2011 – Rated in Televisual Top 100 Indie Producers
- 2011 – BAFTA Scotland for Best Children's Series – Big City Park
- 2011 – IFTA for Best Youth/Children's programme, Ireland – Big City Park
- 2011 – Hugo Television Award, Chicago – Silver Plaque – Big City Park
- 2011 – CINE Golden Eagle – Big City Park
- 2011 – Celtic Media Festival – Commended – Big City Park
- 2011 – Gold Plaque – Hugo Television Award, Chicago – Sesame Tree
- 2011 – CINE Golden Eagle – Sesame Tree
- 2011 – Deloitte Rising Star – Technology Fast 50 Awards
- 2010 – Rated in Televisual Top 100 Indie Producers
- 2010 – Hugo Television Award, Chicago – Winner – Sesame Tree
- 2010 – CINE Golden Eagle – Sesame Tree
- 2010 – Belfast Business Awards – Best Creative Industry – Winner
