= Big & Small =

British comedy television series (2008–2011)

- Genre: Children's comedy Musical
- Created by: Kathy Waugh
- Creative directors: Jason Hopley; Jamie Shannon
- Voices of: Lenny Henry; Imelda Staunton (series 1–2); Tamsin Heatley (series 3)
- Opening theme: "The Big and Small Song" by Lenny Henry (UK)
- Countries of origin: United Kingdom; Canada
- Original language: English
- No. of series: 3
- No. of episodes: 78

Production
- Executive producers: Sarah Colclough; Jack Lenz; Anne Brogan
- Producers: David Collier; Sharon Summerling
- Running time: 11 minutes
- Production companies: Kindle Entertainment; 3J's Productions; Studio 100; Sixteen South (series 3)

Original release
- Network: CBeebies (United Kingdom); Treehouse TV (Canada); S4C (Welsh)
- Release: 6 October 2008 – 7 November 2011

Big & Small is a children's television series created by Kathy Waugh and directed by Jason Hopley & Jamie Shannon. The series follows the lives of two very different best friends named Big and Small.

Big & Small is a co-production between Kindle Entertainment, 3J's Productions and Sixteen South (series 3), in association with the BBC, Treehouse TV and Studio 100. Three series were aired between 2008 and 2011.

== Voice cast ==
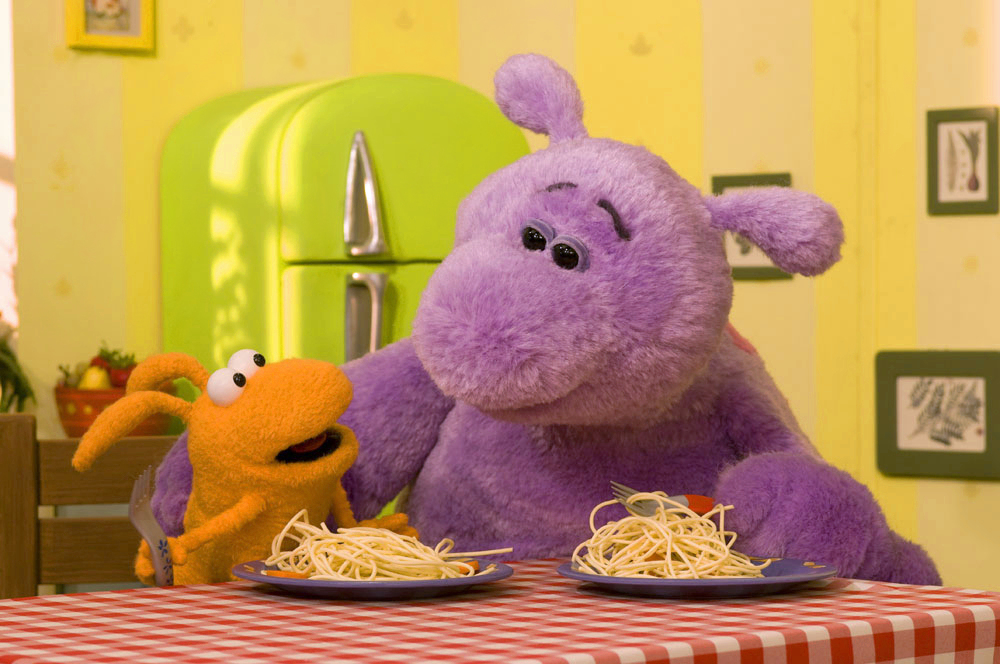
Big (right) and Small (left)

- Lenny Henry as Big, a large and purple bear-like creature who is gentle and laid-back.
- Lenny Henry as Small, a small and orange rabbit-like creature who is very energetic and impulsive.
- Imelda Staunton and later Tamsin Heatley as Ruby, a pink red-haired mouse who lives in a hole within Big and Small's house. She is generally friendly but has a short temper.
- Imelda Staunton as Twiba, a light-green worm who lives inside an apple in Big and Small's garden. She is pompous and self-absorbed, but remains friendly with Big, Small, and Ruby.
- An uncredited voice actor as the frogs, a pair of hat-wearing frogs who live in the garden pond. One is lime green with a red wool hat, while the other is dark green with a business hat.

== Episodes ==
=== Series overview ===
Series	Episodes	Originally released	
Series	Episodes	First released	Last released
1	26	6 October 2008	7 November 2008
2	26	19 October 2009	23 November 2009
3	26	12 September 2011	7 November 2011

=== Episode list ===
==== Series 1 ====
1. Something is Missing
2. A Door for Small
3. Fish Wish
4. There's a Space for Small
5. A Piece of Cake
6. The Worm in Big's Apple
7. The Case of the Missing Dinosaur
8. Stormy Weather
9. Playing by the Rules
10. A Sound Idea
11. Rain Dance
12. My Friend Fang
13. Starry Starry Night
14. Bad Luck Machine
15. The Big Sneeze
16. The Mysterious Woods
17. Surprise, Surprise
18. The Sleep Toy Thingie
19. Smashing Tomatoes
20. Picture Perfect
21. Twiba's Treasure Hunt
22. The Case of the Clogs
23. Twiba Takes Flight
24. Cabin Fever
25. Five Minute Sled
26. The Gwelf In The Garden

==== Series 2 ====
1. Tall Small
2. I Spy a Firefly
3. Say Cheese
4. Celery Day
5. The Singing Gwelf
6. The Road Not Taken
7. Party Time
8. Dream Team
9. I See, You Saw
10. The Big Race
11. Abracadabra
12. Frog Fight
13. The Broken Scooter
14. Blame it on the Drain
15. Small's Branch
16. Play Date
17. The Case of the Missing Kohlrabi
18. Promises, Promises
19. Spring Fling
20. Never Say No
21. The Book of Big
22. A Quiet Day
23. The Missing Biscuit
24. Thar She Buzzes
25. The Not So Happy Camper
26. Big & Small Day

==== Series 3 ====
1. Small, Small, Let Down Your Hair
2. Boingo Boys
3. The Rainbow
4. The Scare-Small
5. The Box
6. The Missing Answer
7. Millions of Vegetable Soup
8. Hot and Bothered
9. A Room of Small's Own
10. Catch a Fallen Star
11. Thanks for the Memories
12. Opposite Day
13. Fishing for Elephants
14. The Hiccups
15. Friends in a Fog
16. The Biggest Story
17. A Room With a View
18. Just What I Wanted
19. Slippery Slide
20. A Letter From Furthermost
21. Balloonatics
22. An Evening of Delights
23. The Egg
24. Gone Fishin'
25. Hopalong Small
26. Moon Race

== Broadcasters ==
In the United Kingdom, Big & Small was shown on CBeebies, BBC1, and BBC2, as well as Cyw in Wales. Treehouse TV aired Big & Small in Canada. In total, over 40 channels worldwide have featured the programme.

In April 2018, Studio 100 pre-sold the series in China.

=== United Kingdom ===
On March 12, 2009, ITV Global Entertainment secured the UK Home Media rights to the series. Through their ITV DVD label, the company released We're Big & Small! on March 30. containing the first eight episodes of Series 1 as well as three bonus shorts.

Two more DVDs were also released. ITV Studios released Starry, Starry Night, containing episodes 9 to 16 of Series 1, while Abbey Home Media released The Biggest Story, containing episodes 1 to 5 and episode 16 of Series 3.

The Abbey Home Media compilation DVD CBeebies Collection contained the episode "Moon Race".

=== Canada ===
Nelvana Enterprises held the home media rights to the series in Canada and, in December 2009, secured a distribution deal with Phase 4 Films to release the show and select others on DVD under their KaBOOM! Entertainment children's label.

Three DVDs were released in the country, the first, Meet Big and Small contained five episodes of Series 1. The other two that were released were Party Time! and Play Date. All three DVDs feature Canadian English voicetrack.

== Awards ==
- Awarded "Best Writing" at the 2013 KidScreen Awards
- Awarded "Best Interactive Service" for Big & Small Online at the BAFTA Children's Awards in 2009.
- Awarded "Best Children's Programme" for the episode "Blame It on the Drain" at the Royal Television Society's Educational Television Awards for 2009. Big & Small was called "A well constructed programme with great warmth, charm and child appeal."
