= Sesame Tree =

- Genre: Educational
- Theme music composer: Duke Special
- Countries of origin: United Kingdom; United States
- Original language: English
- No. of seasons: 2
- No. of episodes: 40

Production
- Running time: 15 minutes
- Production companies: Sixteen South; Sesame Workshop; BBC Northern Ireland

Original release
- Network: BBC Two; CBeebies
- Release: 5 April 2008 – 28 January 2011

Sesame Tree is an adaptation of the children's television series, Sesame Street, which was made entirely in Northern Ireland. The series was produced by Belfast based production company, Sixteen South and Sesame Workshop. The first episode aired on BBC Two in Northern Ireland on 5 April 2008, with the first series subsequently airing nationwide on CBeebies in August 2008.

A second series was launched in November 2010, and broadcast on CBeebies and BBC Two from 22 November 2010.

== Production ==
The project had been under consideration since 2004; in Sesame Workshop's presentation on their international projects, Northern Ireland was listed as a goal, with the intent of 'building the Sesame model for respect and understanding curriculum across the sectarian divide."

In January 2006, The American Ireland Fund provided support to realise the project. Additional funding was secured from the International Fund for Ireland (IFI) and the Northern Ireland Fund for Reconciliation. Funding for the second series was provided by IFI and Northern Ireland Screen.

All the characters were developed by Sesame Workshop and Sixteen South, and the Muppets for the series were built by The Jim Henson Company in New York, who worked with exclusively local writers and Muppet Performers. Martin P. Robinson assisted in auditioning and training local performers, who include Lesa Gillespie, Paul Currie, Michael McNulty, Mike Smith, Helen Sloan and Alana Kerr.

The Northern Irish science fiction writer, Ian McDonald, has contributed scripts to the series, along with local writing trio Kieran Doherty, Danny Nash and Ian Nugent. Each of these four writers has written five episodes each, comprising the full twenty episodes of the first series.

== Format ==
The initial series of Sesame Tree comprised twenty seventeen-minute programmes, aimed at an audience of children aged 2–5. Following a format similar to that of The Hoobs, it is composed of original puppet segments featuring Muppets created specifically for the series, local mini documentaries depicting a child's eye view of life in Northern Ireland, and classic Muppet segments from the library of Sesame Street.

The common area of the programme is the "Sesame Tree" – a hollow tree where children can ask questions and have them answered; the Sesame Tree is the programme's analogue to the street in the original Sesame Street programme. The residents of the Tree are Potto; Hilda and Archie, a new arrival for the second series.

The production also coincides with Tar ag Spraoi Sesame, an Irish dubbed package of Play with Me Sesame, airing on TG4 in Ireland. The title and background music for the programme was composed by artist of Northern Ireland, Duke Special.

== Characters ==
- Potto (performed by Paul Currie and Michael McNulty) – The main character of the series. He is a book loving monster inventor who likes to "potter" around the devices. Potto is best friends with Hilda the Hare and is the cousin of Telly Monster. His puppet is the same AM Monster design that was used for Humphrey from Sesame Street.
- Hilda (performed by Lesa Gillespie) – A seven-year-old Irish Hare who is best friends with Potto.
- Claribelle (performed by Helen Sloan (series 1) and Alana Kerr (series 2)) – A bespectacled, red Muppet bird.
- Samson and Goliath (performed by Sarah Lyle and Alana Kerr) – A bunch of Bookworms that live amongst Potto's books.
- Weatherberries (performed by Sarah Lyle and Michael McNulty) – A bunch of singing fruit. They announce the weather whenever Hilda asks what the weather will be like that day.
- Archie (performed by Mike Smith) – A bespectacled red squirrel who loves maths. He was introduced in Season 2.

== Episodes ==
=== Series 1 ===
1. The Bookworms Move House
2. Food for Thought
3. Booga Granny Hare!
4. The Share Necessities
5. Big Hare Day
6. Finders Keepers
7. A Present for Claribelle
8. CSI Sesame Tree
9. Beezer Broccoli Birthday Cake
10. Arty Party
11. Turn and Turn About
12. Practice Makes Perfect
13. Potto's Really Rockin' Pocket Shoes
14. One Wee Minute
15. Hilda's Two Birthdays
16. Same Difference
17. Potto's Perfect Picnic
18. Sad Hare Blues
19. The Goldfish Tree
20. A Very Special Visitor

=== Series 2 ===
1. Hilda's Beezer Buddies
2. Best of Furry Friends
3. Let's Have a Party
4. Run Potto Run
5. Out of Tune
6. Super Squirrel's Super Glasses
7. Potto's Heard of Cows
8. Potto's Movie Mania (Elmgrove Primary School)
9. Squirrel's Day
10. It's Not Me It's You
11. Potto's Never Ending Story
12. Pizza Perfection
13. Scaredy Squirrel
14. Treemendous
15. The Trying Game
16. Promises, Promises
17. Squirrel School
18. The Big Sleepover
19. Yes We Can
20. Potto's Big Day Out
