= 2016–17 United States network television schedule (daytime) =

The 2016–17 daytime network television schedule for four of the five major English-language commercial broadcast networks in the United States covers the weekday daytime hours from September 2016 to August 2017. The schedule is followed by a list per network of returning series, and any series canceled after the 2015–16 season.

As a result of NBC replacing its' NBC Kids block with The More You Know, the five major commercial broadcast networks no longer run regular series targeted towards viewers under the age of 13.

Affiliates fill time periods not occupied by network programs with local or syndicated programming. PBS – which offers daytime programming through a children's program block, PBS Kids – is not included, as its member television stations have local flexibility over most of their schedules and broadcast times for network shows may vary. Also not included are stations affiliated with Fox (as the network does not air a daytime network schedule or network news), The CW Plus and MyNetworkTV (as the programming services also do not offer daytime programs of any kind), and Ion Television (as its schedule is composed mainly of syndicated reruns).

== Legend ==
- Light yellow indicates talk shows.
- Green indicates soap operas.
- Pink indicates game shows.
- Gold indicates news programming.
- White indicates local programming.
- Gray indicates encore programming (e.g., reruns of prime-time programming).
- Light blue indicates other programs not applicable to the above categorizations.
- New series are highlighted in **bold**.

== Schedule ==
- All times correspond to U.S. Eastern and Pacific Time scheduling (except for some live sports or events). Except where affiliates slot certain programs outside their network-dictated timeslots, subtract one hour for Central, Mountain, Alaska, and Hawaii–Aleutian times.
- Local schedules may differ, as affiliates have the option to pre-empt or delay network programs. Such scheduling may be limited to preemptions caused by local or national breaking news or weather coverage (which may force stations to tape delay certain programs in overnight timeslots or defer them to a co-operated station or digital subchannel in their regular timeslot) and any major sports events scheduled to air in a weekday timeslot (mainly during major holidays). Stations may air shows at other times at their preference.

=== Monday-Friday ===
Network	7:00 am	7:30 am	8:00 am	8:30 am	9:00 am	9:30 am	10:00 am	10:30 am	11:00 am	11:30 am	noon	12:30 pm	1:00 pm	1:30 pm	2:00 pm	2:30 pm	3:00 pm	3:30 pm	4:00 pm	4:30 pm	5:00 pm	5:30 pm	6:00 pm	6:30 pm
ABC	Good Morning America				Local and/or syndicated programming				The View		Local and/or syndicated programming		The Chew		General Hospital		Local and/or syndicated programming							ABC World News Tonight with David Muir
CBS	CBS This Morning				Local and/or syndicated programming		Let's Make a Deal		The Price is Right		Local and/or syndicated programming	The Young and the Restless		The Bold and the Beautiful	The Talk		Local and/or syndicated programming							CBS Evening News with Scott Pelley
NBC	Today^{†}								Local and/or syndicated programming				Days of Our Lives		Local and/or syndicated programming									NBC Nightly News with Lester Holt
CW	Local and/or syndicated programming																		**The Robert Irvine Show**		Local and/or syndicated programming			

Notes:

- CBS owned-and-operated and affiliate stations have the option of airing Let's Make a Deal at either 10:00 a.m. or 3:00 p.m. Eastern, depending on the station's choice of feed.
- (†) Today aired its last edition as a standard four-hour broadcast on September 22, 2017. Afterwards, it was split into three structurally differing programs with the fourth hour turning into Kathie Lee & Hoda.

=== Saturday ===
Network		7:00 am	7:30 am	8:00 am	8:30 am	9:00 am	9:30 am	10:00 am	10:30 am	11:00 am	11:30 am	noon	12:30 pm	1:00 pm	1:30 pm	2:00 pm	2:30 pm	3:00 pm	3:30 pm	4:00 pm	4:30 pm	5:00 pm	5:30 pm	6:00 pm	6:30 pm
ABC	Fall	Good Morning America		Local and/or syndicated programming				Jack Hanna's Wild Countdown	**Ocean Treks with Jeff Corwin**	Sea Rescue	The Wildlife Docs	Rock the Park	Outback Adventures with Tim Faulkner	ESPN College Football on ABC											
ABC	Winter	Good Morning America		Local and/or syndicated programming				Jack Hanna's Wild Countdown	**Ocean Treks with Jeff Corwin**	Sea Rescue	The Wildlife Docs	Rock the Park	Outback Adventures with Tim Faulkner	ESPN on ABC and/or local programming				ESPN on ABC programming						Local news	ABC World News Saturday
CBS	Fall	CBS This Morning Saturday				Local and/or syndicated programming		Lucky Dog	Dr. Chris Pet Vet	The Henry Ford's Innovation Nation with Mo Rocca	The Inspectors	Chicken Soup for the Soul's Hidden Heroes	**The Open Road with Dr. Chris**	SEC on CBS											
CBS	Winter	CBS This Morning Saturday				Local and/or syndicated programming		Lucky Dog	Dr. Chris Pet Vet	The Henry Ford's Innovation Nation with Mo Rocca	The Inspectors	Chicken Soup for the Soul's Hidden Heroes	**The Open Road with Dr. Chris**	CBS Sports and/or local programming					CBS Sports programming					Local news	CBS Weekend News
NBC		Today				Local and/or syndicated programming		**The Voyager with Josh Garcia**	**Wilderness Vet**	**Journey with Dylan Dreyer**	**Naturally, Danny Seo**	**Give**	**Heart of a Champion with Lauren Thompson**	NBC Sports and/or local programming				NBC Sports programming						Local news	NBC Nightly News with Jose Diaz-Balart
FOX		Local and/or syndicated programming				Xploration Awesome Planet	Xploration Outer Space	Xploration Earth 2050	Xploration Weird But True	Xploration DIY Sci	Xploration Nature Knows Best	Weekend Marketplace				Fox Sports and/or local programming									
The CW	Fall	Calling Dr. Pol		**Rescue Me with Dr. Lisa**	Dog Whisperer with Cesar Milan: Family Edition			Save Our Shelter	**Vacation Creation**	**Dinner Spinner**	**Unlikely Animal Friends**	Local and/or syndicated programming													
The CW	November	Calling Dr. Pol		**Rescue Me with Dr. Lisa**	Dog Whisperer with Cesar Milan: Family Edition			Save Our Shelter	**Vacation Creation**	**Dinner Spinner**	**Save to Win**	Local and/or syndicated programming													
The CW	Spring	Calling Dr. Pol		Dog Whisperer with Cesar Milan: Family Edition				Save Our Shelter	**Vacation Creation**	Save to Win	Unlikely Animal Friends	Local and/or syndicated programming													

- On September 30, 2017, The CW returned the 7:00 a.m. and 11:00 a.m. hours to its owned-and-operated stations and affiliates.

=== Sunday ===
Network		7:00 am	7:30 am	8:00 am	8:30 am	9:00 am	9:30 am	10:00 am	10:30 am	11:00 am	11:30 am	noon	12:30 pm	1:00 pm	1:30 pm	2:00 pm	2:30 pm	3:00 pm	3:30 pm	4:00 pm	4:30 pm	5:00 pm	5:30 pm	6:00 pm	6:30 pm
ABC		Local and/or syndicated programming		Good Morning America		Local and/or syndicated programming		This Week with George Stephanopoluos		ESPN on ABC and/or local programming														Local news	ABC World News Tonight with Tom Llamas
CBS	Fall	Local and/or syndicated programming				CBS News Sunday Morning			Face the Nation		Local and/or syndicated programming	NFL Today		NFL on CBS											
CBS	Mid-winter	Local and/or syndicated programming				CBS News Sunday Morning			Face the Nation		Local and/or syndicated programming	CBS Sports and/or local programming												Local news	CBS Weekend News
NBC		Local and/or syndicated programming		Sunday Today with Willie Geist		Meet the Press		Local and/or syndicated programming				NBC Sports and/or local programming												Local news	NBC Nightly News with Kate Snow
FOX	Fall	Local and/or syndicated programming				Fox News Sunday		Local and/or syndicated programming		Fox NFL Kickoff		Fox NFL Sunday		Fox NFL (and sometimes local programming)											
FOX	Mid-winter	Local and/or syndicated programming				Fox News Sunday		Local and/or syndicated programming				Fox Sports and/or local programming												Local and/or syndicated programming	

== By network ==
=== ABC ===
Returning series:

- ABC World News Tonight
- The Chew
- General Hospital
- Good Morning America
- The View

=== CBS ===
Returning series:

- The Bold and the Beautiful
- CBS Evening News
- CBS This Morning
- Let's Make a Deal
- The Price is Right
- The Talk
- The Young and the Restless
- CBS Dream Team
  - Lucky Dog
  - The Henry Ford Innovation Nation with Mo Rocca
  - Chicken Soup for the Soul's Hidden Heroes
  - The Inspectors
  - Dr. Chris: Pet Vet

Not returning from 2015–16:

- CBS Dream Team
  - Game Changers with Kevin Frazier

=== The CW ===
New series:

- **The Robert Irvine Show**
- One Magnificent Morning
  - **Rescue Me with Dr. Lisa**
  - **Dinner Spinner**
  - **Unlikely Animal Friends**
  - **Vacation Creation**
  - **Save to Win**

Returning series:

- One Magnificent Morning
  - Dog Whisperer: Family Edition
  - Calling Dr. Pol
  - Save Our Shelter

Not returning from 2015–16:

- The Bill Cunningham Show
- One Magnificent Morning
  - Dog Town, USA
  - Dream Quest
  - Hatched

=== NBC ===
Returning series:

- Days of Our Lives
- NBC Nightly News
- Today

New series:

- **The More You Know**
  - **The Voyager with Josh Garcia**
  - **The Champion Within with Lauren Thompson**
  - **Give**
  - **Wilderness Vet with Dr. Oakley**
  - **Journey with Dylan Dreyer**
  - **Naturally, Danny Seo**

**Not returning from 2015–16**

- NBC Kids (continues on Sprout and Telemundo)
  - Astroblast!
  - Noodle and Doodle
  - The Chica Show
  - Clangers
  - Nina's World
  - Earth to Luna!
  - Floogals
  - LazyTown
  - Ruff-Ruff, Tweet and Dave
  - Terrific Trucks
  - Tree Fu Tom

== See also ==
- 2016–17 United States network television schedule (prime-time)
- 2016–17 United States network television schedule (late night)

== Sources ==
- Curt Alliaume. "ABC Daytime Schedule". Curt Alliaume’s Utterly Irrelevant Web Site. Archived from the original on October 15, 2007.
- Curt Alliaume. "CBS Daytime Schedule". Curt Alliaume’s Utterly Irrelevant Web Site. Archived from the original on October 15, 2007.
- Curt Alliaume. "NBC Daytime Schedule". Curt Alliaume’s Utterly Irrelevant Web Site. Archived from the original on October 12, 2007.
