= 2015–16 United States network television schedule (daytime) =

The 2015–16 daytime network television schedule for four of the five major English-language commercial broadcast networks in the United States covers the weekday daytime hours from September 2015 to August 2016. The schedule is followed by a list per network of returning series, and any series canceled after the 2014–15 season.

NBC was the last of the five major commercial broadcast networks to run series for viewers under the age of 13 on Saturday mornings, as they would replace their NBC Kids block with The More You Know beginning next season.

Affiliates fill time periods not occupied by network programs with local or syndicated programming. PBS – which offers daytime programming through a children's program block, PBS Kids – is not included, as its member television stations have local flexibility over most of their schedules and broadcast times for network shows may vary. Also not included are stations affiliated with Fox (as the network does not air a daytime network schedule or network news), The CW Plus and MyNetworkTV (as the programming services also do not offer daytime programs of any kind), and Ion Television (as its schedule is composed mainly of syndicated reruns).

== Legend ==
- Light yellow indicates talk shows.
- Green indicates soap operas.
- Pink indicates game shows.
- Gold indicates news programming.
- White indicates local programming.
- Light teal indicates sporting events.
- Light purple indicates children's and/or E/I-compliant programming.
- Light blue indicates other programs not applicable to the above categorizations.
- New series are highlighted in **bold**.

== Schedule ==
- All times correspond to U.S. Eastern and Pacific Time scheduling (except for some live sports or events). Except where affiliates slot certain programs outside their network-dictated timeslots, subtract one hour for Central, Mountain, Alaska, and Hawaii–Aleutian times.
- Local schedules may differ, as affiliates have the option to pre-empt or delay network programs. Such scheduling may be limited to preemptions caused by local or national breaking news or weather coverage (which may force stations to tape delay certain programs in overnight timeslots or defer them to a co-operated station or digital subchannel in their regular timeslot) and any major sports events scheduled to air in a weekday timeslot (mainly during major holidays). Stations may air shows at other times at their preference.
- Most of NBC's daytime programming had been preempted from August 6 to 21, 2016 due to the 2016 Summer Olympics from Rio de Janeiro, Brazil.

=== Monday-Friday ===
Network	7:00 am	7:30 am	8:00 am	8:30 am	9:00 am	9:30 am	10:00 am	10:30 am	11:00 am	11:30 am	noon	12:30 pm	1:00 pm	1:30 pm	2:00 pm	2:30 pm	3:00 pm	3:30 pm	4:00 pm	4:30 pm	5:00 pm	5:30 pm	6:00 pm	6:30 pm
ABC	Good Morning America				Local and/or syndicated programming				The View		Local and/or syndicated programming		The Chew		General Hospital		Local and/or syndicated programming							ABC World News Tonight with David Muir
CBS	CBS This Morning				Local and/or syndicated programming		Let's Make a Deal		The Price is Right		Local and/or syndicated programming	The Young and the Restless		The Bold and the Beautiful	The Talk		Local and/or syndicated programming							CBS Evening News with Scott Pelley
NBC	Today								Local and/or syndicated programming				Days of Our Lives		Local and/or syndicated programming									NBC Nightly News with Lester Holt
CW	Local and/or syndicated programming																		The Bill Cunningham Show		Local and/or syndicated programming			

- Note: CBS owned-and-operated and affiliate stations have the option of airing Let's Make a Deal at either 10:00 a.m. or 3:00 p.m. Eastern, depending on the station's choice of feed.

=== Saturday ===
Network		7:00 am	7:30 am	8:00 am	8:30 am	9:00 am	9:30 am	10:00 am	10:30 am	11:00 am	11:30 am	noon	12:30 pm	1:00 pm	1:30 pm	2:00 pm	2:30 pm	3:00 pm	3:30 pm	4:00 pm	4:30 pm	5:00 pm	5:30 pm	6:00 pm	6:30 pm
ABC‡	Fall	Good Morning America		Local and/or syndicated programming				Jack Hanna's Wild Countdown	Ocean Mysteries with Jeff Corwin	Sea Rescue	The Wildlife Docs	Rock the Park	Born to Explore with Richard Wiese	ESPN College Football on ABC											
ABC‡	Winter	Good Morning America		Local and/or syndicated programming				Jack Hanna's Wild Countdown	Ocean Mysteries with Jeff Corwin	Sea Rescue	The Wildlife Docs	Rock the Park	Born to Explore with Richard Wiese	ESPN on ABC and/or local programming				ESPN on ABC programming						Local news	ABC World News Saturday
CBS	Fall	CBS This Morning Saturday				Local and/or syndicated programming		The Henry Ford's Innovation Nation with Mo Rocca	**The Inspectors**	**Chicken Soup for the Soul's Hidden Heroes**	Game Changers with Kevin Frazier	Lucky Dog	Dr. Chris Pet Vet	SEC on CBS											
CBS	Winter	CBS This Morning Saturday				Local and/or syndicated programming		The Henry Ford's Innovation Nation with Mo Rocca	**The Inspectors**	**Chicken Soup for the Soul's Hidden Heroes**	Game Changers with Kevin Frazier	Lucky Dog	Dr. Chris Pet Vet	CBS Sports and/or local programming					CBS Sports programming					Local news	CBS Evening News
CBS	Summer	CBS This Morning Saturday				Local and/or syndicated programming		The Henry Ford's Innovation Nation with Mo Rocca	**The Inspectors**	**Chicken Soup for the Soul's Hidden Heroes**	Game Changers with Kevin Frazier	Lucky Dog	Dr. Chris Pet Vet	CBS Sports and/or local programming					CBS Sports programming					Local news	**CBS Weekend News**
Fox‡	Fall	Local and/or syndicated programming						Xploration Awesome Planet	Xploration Outer Space	Xploration Earth 2050	Xploration Animal Science	Fox Sports and/or local programming													
Fox‡	Winter	Local and/or syndicated programming						Xploration Awesome Planet	Xploration Outer Space	Xploration Earth 2050	**Xploration FabLab**	Weekend Marketplace				Fox Sports and/or local programming									
Fox‡	Spring	Local and/or syndicated programming				Xploration Awesome Planet	Xploration Outer Space	Xploration Earth 2050		Xploration FabLab		Weekend Marketplace				Fox Sports and/or local programming									
Fox‡	Late Summer	Local and/or syndicated programming				Xploration Awesome Planet	Xploration Outer Space	Xploration Earth 2050	**Xploration Weird But True**	**Xploration DIY Sci**	**Xploration Nature Knows Best**	Weekend Marketplace				Fox Sports and/or local programming									
NBC	Fall	Today				Local and/or syndicated programming		Ruff-Ruff, Tweet and Dave	Astroblast!	**Clangers**	Earth to Luna!	LazyTown	Tree Fu Tom	NBC Sports and/or local programming				NBC Sports programming						Local news	NBC Nightly News with Jose Diaz-Balart
NBC	January	Today				Local and/or syndicated programming		**Nina's World**	Ruff-Ruff, Tweet and Dave	Astroblast!	Clangers	Earth to Luna!	LazyTown	NBC Sports and/or local programming				NBC Sports programming						Local news	NBC Nightly News with Jose Diaz-Balart
NBC	February	Today				Local and/or syndicated programming		**Floogals**	Nina's World	Ruff-Ruff, Tweet and Dave	Astroblast!	Clangers	LazyTown	NBC Sports and/or local programming				NBC Sports programming						Local news	NBC Nightly News with Jose Diaz-Balart
NBC	Spring	Today				Local and/or syndicated programming		**Floogals**	Nina's World	Ruff-Ruff, Tweet and Dave	Astroblast!	The Chica Show	Noodle and Doodle	NBC Sports and/or local programming				NBC Sports programming						Local news	NBC Nightly News with Jose Diaz-Balart
NBC	July	Today				Local and/or syndicated programming		**Floogals**	Nina's World	Ruff-Ruff, Tweet and Dave	**Terrific Trucks**	The Chica Show	Noodle and Doodle	NBC Sports and/or local programming				NBC Sports programming						Local news	NBC Nightly News with Jose Diaz-Balart
The CW	Fall	Calling Dr. Pol		Dog Town, USA	Dog Whisperer with Cesar Millan: Family Edition				Dog Town, USA	Expedition Wild	Rock the Park	Local and/or syndicated programming													
The CW	October	Calling Dr. Pol		Dog Town, USA	Dog Whisperer with Cesar Millan: Family Edition				**Save Our Shelter**	**Hatched**	**Dream Quest**	Local and/or syndicated programming													
The CW	Spring	Calling Dr. Pol		Dog Town, USA	Dog Whisperer with Cesar Millan: Family Edition				**Save Our Shelter**	Dream Quest	Hatched	Local and/or syndicated programming													

Notes:

- (‡) ABC and Fox do not handle programming responsibilities for their programming blocks, but offers syndicated blocks of E/I-compliant programming that are intended for exclusive distribution to their stations. Litton's Weekend Adventure is offered to ABC stations by arrangement with Litton Entertainment and Xploration Station is offered to Fox stations by arrangement with Steve Rotfeld Productions.
- To comply with FCC educational programming regulations, stations may defer certain programs featured in their respective network's E/I program blocks to determined weekend late morning or afternoon time periods if a sporting event is not scheduled in the timeslot or in place of paid programming that would otherwise be scheduled.
- Airtimes of sporting events may vary depending on the offerings scheduled for that weekend. Scheduling overruns may occur due to events going into overtime, weather delays or other game stoppages, preempting scheduled local or syndicated programming.

=== Sunday ===
Network		7:00 am	7:30 am	8:00 am	8:30 am	9:00 am	9:30 am	10:00 am	10:30 am	11:00 am	11:30 am	noon	12:30 pm	1:00 pm	1:30 pm	2:00 pm	2:30 pm	3:00 pm	3:30 pm	4:00 pm	4:30 pm	5:00 pm	5:30 pm	6:00 pm	6:30 pm
ABC		Local and/or syndicated programming		Good Morning America		Local and/or syndicated programming		This Week with George Stephanopoulos		ESPN on ABC and/or local programming														Local news	ABC World News Sunday
CBS	Fall	Local and/or syndicated programming				CBS News Sunday Morning			Face the Nation		Local and/or syndicated programming	NFL Today		NFL on CBS											
CBS	Mid-winter	Local and/or syndicated programming				CBS News Sunday Morning			Face the Nation		Local and/or syndicated programming	CBS Sports and/or local programming												Local news	CBS Evening News
CBS	Summer	Local and/or syndicated programming				CBS News Sunday Morning			Face the Nation		Local and/or syndicated programming	CBS Sports and/or local programming												Local news	**CBS Weekend News**
NBC	Fall	Local and/or syndicated programming		Today		Meet the Press		Local and/or syndicated programming				NBC Sports and/or local programming												Local news	NBC Nightly News with Kate Snow
NBC	April	Local and/or syndicated programming		Sunday Today with Willie Geist		Meet the Press		Local and/or syndicated programming				NBC Sports and/or local programming												Local news	NBC Nightly News with Kate Snow
Fox	Fall	Local and/or syndicated programming				Fox News Sunday		Local and/or syndicated programming		**Fox NFL Kickoff**		Fox NFL Sunday		Fox NFL (and sometimes local programming)											
Fox	Mid-winter	Local and/or syndicated programming				Fox News Sunday		Local and/or syndicated programming				Fox Sports and/or local programming												Local and/or syndicated programming	

Notes:

- To comply with FCC educational programming regulations, stations may defer certain programs featured in their respective network's E/I program blocks to determined weekend late morning or afternoon time periods if a sporting event is not scheduled in the timeslot or in place of paid programming that would otherwise be scheduled.
- Airtimes of sporting events may vary depending on the offerings scheduled for that weekend. Scheduling overruns may occur due to events going into overtime, weather delays or other game stoppages, preempting scheduled local or syndicated programming.

== By network ==
=== ABC ===
Returning series:

- ABC World News Tonight with David Muir
- ESPN on ABC
  - ESPN College Football on ABC
- The Chew
- General Hospital
- Good Morning America
- Litton's Weekend Adventure(‡)
  - Born to Explore with Richard Wiese
  - Jack Hanna's Wild Countdown
  - Ocean Mysteries with Jeff Corwin
  - Sea Rescue
  - The Wildlife Docs
- The View
- This Week with George Stephanopoulos

New series:

- Litton's Weekend Adventure(‡)
  - **Rock the Park** (moved from The CW's One Magnificent Morning)

Not returning from 2014–15:

- Litton's Weekend Adventure(‡)
  - Outback Adventures with Tim Faulkner

=== CBS ===
Returning series:

- The Bold and the Beautiful
- CBS Dream Team
  - Dr. Chris Pet Vet
  - Game Changers with Kevin Frazier
  - Lucky Dog
  - The Henry Ford's Innovation Nation with Mo Rocca
- CBS Evening News with Scott Pelley
- CBS This Morning
- CBS Sports
  - College Football on CBS/SEC on CBS
  - NFL on CBS
  - The NFL Today
- CBS Sunday Morning
- Face the Nation
- Let's Make a Deal
- The Price is Right
- The Talk
- The Young and the Restless

New series:

- CBS Dream Team
  - **Chicken Soup for the Soul's Hidden Heroes**
  - **The Inspectors**
- **CBS Weekend News**

Not returning from 2014–15:

- CBS Dream Team
  - All In with Laila Ali
  - Recipe Rehab

=== The CW ===
Returning series:

- The Bill Cunningham Show
- One Magnificent Morning
  - Calling Dr. Pol
  - Dog Whisperer with Cesar Millan: Family Edition
  - Dog Town, USA
  - Expedition Wild
  - Rock the Park (moved to ABC's Litton's Weekend Adventure)

New series:

- One Magnificent Morning
  - **Dream Quest**
  - **Hatched**
  - **Save Our Shelter**

Not returning from 2014–15:

- One Magnificent Morning
  - The Brady Barr Experience

=== Fox ===
Returning series:

- Fox News Sunday
- Fox Sports
  - Fox NFL
  - Fox NFL Sunday
- Xploration Station(‡)
  - Xploration Animal Science
  - Xploration Awesome Planet
  - Xploration Outer Space
  - Xploration Earth 2050
- Weekend Marketplace

New series:

- Fox Sports
  - **Fox NFL Kickoff**
- Xploration Station(‡)
  - **Xploration DIY Sci**
  - **Xploration FabLab**
  - **Xploration Nature Knows Best**
  - **Xploration Weird But True**

=== NBC ===
Returning series:

- Days of Our Lives
- Meet the Press
- NBC Kids
  - Astroblast!
  - The Chica Show
  - Earth to Luna!
  - LazyTown (reruns only)
  - Noodle and Doodle
  - Ruff-Ruff, Tweet and Dave
  - Tree Fu Tom
- NBC Nightly News with Lester Holt
- Today

New series:

- NBC Kids
  - **Clangers**
  - **Floogals**
  - **Nina's World**
  - **Terrific Trucks**

Not returning from 2014–15:

- NBC Kids
  - Poppy Cat (continues on Sprout)

== See also ==
- 2015–16 United States network television schedule (prime-time)
- 2015–16 United States network television schedule (late night)

== Sources ==
- Curt Alliaume. "ABC Daytime Schedule". Curt Alliaume’s Utterly Irrelevant Web Site. Archived from the original on October 15, 2007.
- Curt Alliaume. "CBS Daytime Schedule". Curt Alliaume’s Utterly Irrelevant Web Site. Archived from the original on October 15, 2007.
- Curt Alliaume. "NBC Daytime Schedule". Curt Alliaume’s Utterly Irrelevant Web Site. Archived from the original on October 12, 2007.
