= M Resort =

Casino hotel in Nevada, United States

M Resort Spa Casino

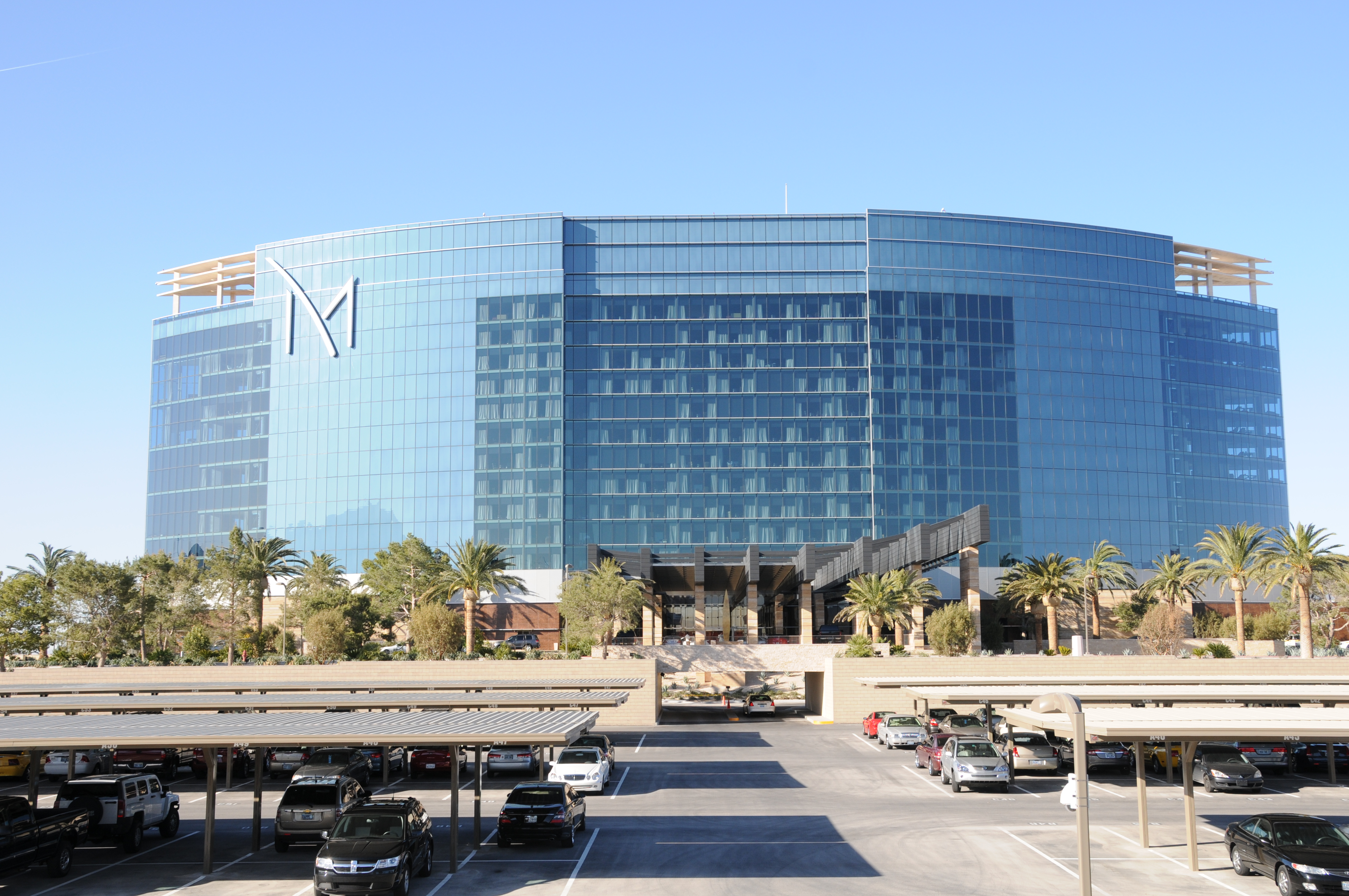
- M Resort's original tower, March 2009
- Interactive map of M Resort Spa Casino
- Location: Henderson, Nevada; 12300 South Las Vegas Blvd
- Opened: March 1, 2009; 17 years ago
- No. of rooms: 765
- Gaming space: 92,000 sq ft (8,500 m^{2})
- Notable restaurants: 16 – A Handcrafted Experience; Anthony's Prime Steak & Seafood; Marinelli's; Raiders Tavern & Grill; Studio B (2009–2020)
- Casino type: Land-based
- Owner: Gaming and Leisure Properties
- Operating license holder: Penn Entertainment
- Website: themresort.com

M Resort Spa Casino is a boutique hotel, spa, and casino in Henderson, Nevada. Located eight miles south of the Las Vegas Strip, it is the southernmost casino in the Las Vegas Valley. It is owned by Gaming and Leisure Properties and operated by Penn Entertainment.

The M is named after the Marnell family. Marnell Corrao Associates, designed and built the M Resort. Construction began on September 1, 2007, and the resort opened on March 1, 2009, amid the Great Recession. In 2010, Penn National Gaming (now Penn Entertainment) purchased $860 million in debt that the resort owed, before taking over complete ownership of the property in 2011. In 2019, the M entered a partnership with the Las Vegas Raiders football team, which now rents out the hotel before games.

The M opened with a 92,000 sq ft (8,500 m^{2}) casino and a 16-story tower with 390 rooms. A second tower opened in late 2025, bringing the room count to 765.

== History ==
The M Resort is named after the Marnell family. It was proposed by Anthony Marnell III, whose father, Tony Marnell, built and operated the Rio resort in the Las Vegas Valley. Tony's company, Marnell Corrao Associates, would design and build the M. The project received preliminary approval from the city of Henderson in October 2005.

In April 2007, MGM Mirage was announced as a financial partner in the project, providing $160 million. The company learned of the M project while in negotiations to sell two of its casinos to Anthony Marnell. Bank of Scotland also provided financing. Construction began on September 1, 2007, and lasted 18 months.

The M was built at the southeast corner of Las Vegas Boulevard and St. Rose Parkway, in an area that was expected to see significant future development. The resort was built on property that was previously occupied by the Last Call Tavern truck stop. Anthony Marnell had an 80-acre site, although he only planned to use a portion of it initially, with the potential for future expansion.

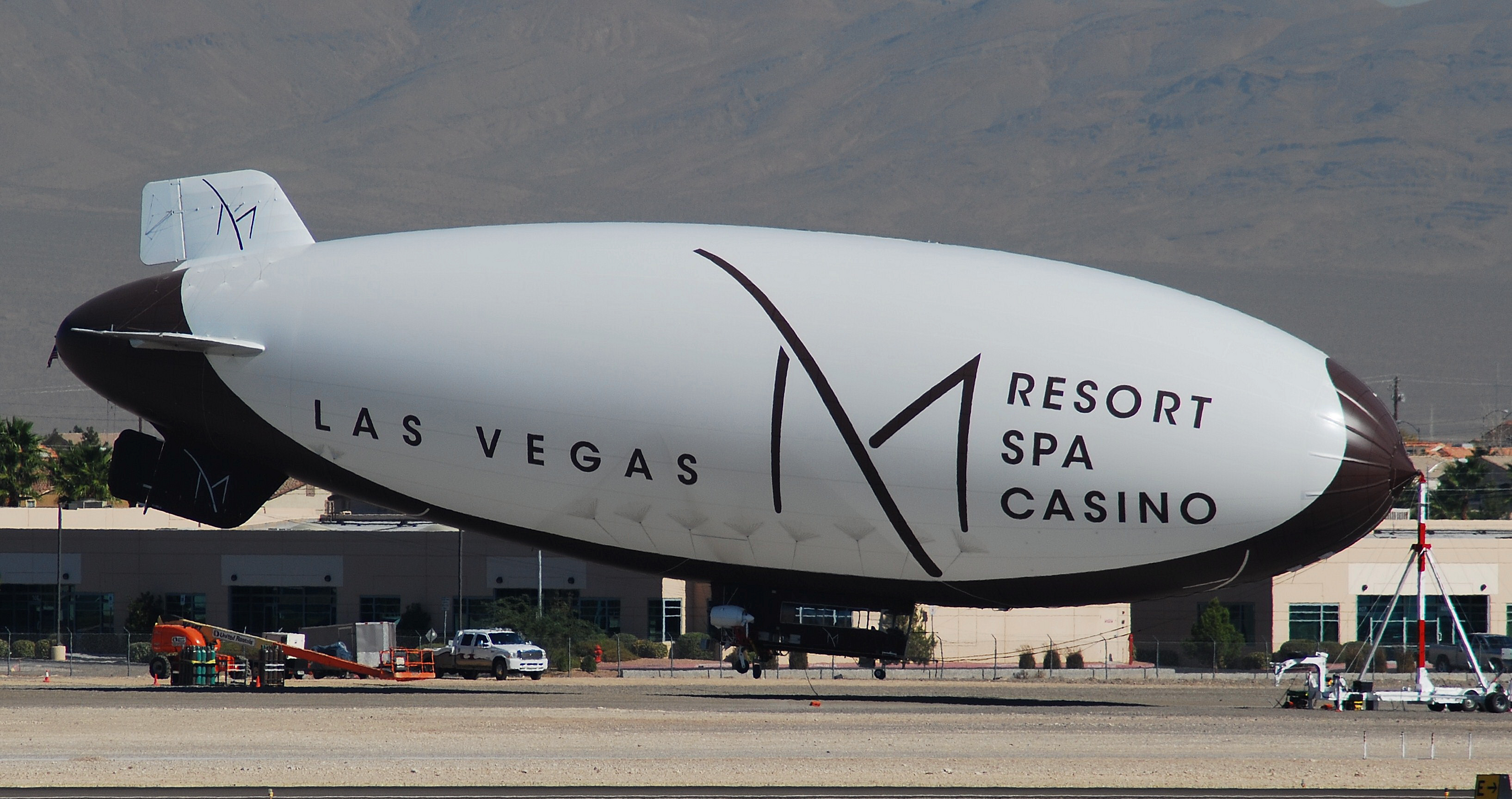
M blimp in October 2008

In May 2008, Marnell announced plans for a 1-million-square-foot shopping mall to be added to the resort within four years. It would be built and operated by Taubman Centers, and would be the first mall in the area. Plans for the retail mall and a potential hotel expansion were later canceled, due to the Great Recession. A Galaxy Theatres had also been planned for the resort, but was never built. Construction proceeded on the rest of the resort, although Marnell did have concerns about opening during the economic downturn.

The resort was worth $1 billion, including $700 million for construction and a $300 million value for the land. Each week during construction, Marnell met regularly with contractors and designers to keep construction costs on budget. The hotel tower was topped off on August 8, 2008.

An M-branded blimp was flown around in Las Vegas and California to advertise the resort, months prior to the opening. The M hired 1,800 people, and the blimp was also used to promote the hiring campaign.

=== Opening and later years ===
The M Resort opened to the public at 10:00 p.m. on March 1, 2009, following a 10-minute fireworks show. The public opening was preceded by a VIP event for 4,000 invited guests. It opened two months ahead of schedule, and under budget.

M Resort is the southernmost casino in the Las Vegas Valley. Because of its location just east of Interstate 15, the M is the first resort seen by California motorists arriving in Las Vegas. The M was built eight miles south of the Las Vegas Strip, an area that is popular among tourists. Despite its location, the M was aimed primarily at local residents. Marnell initially estimated that 80 percent of the revenue would come from locals. Value-conscious tourists were another target demographic; Marnell felt that other Las Vegas resorts had begun to overcharge guests in recent years. A number of executives at the new resort had previously worked for the Rio. Marnell strived to recreate the Rio's former reputation for value and friendly customer service; he believed that the latter would be critical to the M's success amid the economic downturn.

M was the first locals-oriented resort to serve the nearby communities of Anthem, Seven Hills, and Southern Highlands, none of which had a resort of their own. Its nearest competitors were the South Point, the Silverton, and Green Valley Ranch.

Within days of its opening, the property experienced strong business and announced that it would hire an additional 250 employees to resolve long lines. Two restaurants in particular were understaffed. In its first month, the M enrolled over 100,000 members in its rewards club, surpassing the intended goal of 25,000. Because of the recession, planned housing communities and businesses near the M were canceled, which eventually had a negative effect on the resort. Business saw a decrease during the summer months of 2009, and MGM Mirage stated that its investment in the resort had lost its value.

Business improved toward the end of the year, after the resort served as the production location for Top Chef: Las Vegas in 2009, boosting customer visitation. In December 2009, the resort featured the tallest non-living Christmas tree in the United States, standing 109 feet. In 2010, the General Services Administration held a controversial conference at the M Resort that later came under scrutiny, due to the high amount of taxpayer money that was spent.

Lloyds Banking Group, which owned Bank of Scotland, controlled $700 million of the M's debt. Lloyds put its stake up in a private auction sale in 2010. Penn National Gaming and Leonard Green & Partners both put up bids to acquire the debt. The Leonard Green bid was in partnership with the Marnells, who believed that they would be successful in acquiring the debt. Penn ultimately prevailed in October 2010, with a $230.5 million bid. The acquisition consisted of $860 million in debt, including subordinated debt previously held by MGM.

The M marked Penn's entrance into the Las Vegas gaming market. Under Penn, the M saw increased business as part of a new marketing campaign. Penn was later approved by the state to take over full ownership. The purchase was finalized on June 1, 2011, with the M becoming a debt-free property. Marnell remained involved as president of the resort, but no longer had any ownership. In 2013, ownership of the M Resort was transferred to Penn's spin-off company, Gaming and Leisure Properties. Penn continued to operate the property. Marnell left as president two years later.

By 2018, the M Resort owed approximately $15 million to the city of Henderson for infrastructure. A decade earlier, the city had given the M several years to make payments, but the resort failed to do so.

In 2019, the M entered a 10-year partnership with the Las Vegas Raiders football team, which had its headquarters a few miles from the resort. Under the deal, the team would rent about 300 rooms at the M each night before a game.

In 2020, the M laid off 352 employees due to the financial impact of the COVID-19 pandemic. An additional 159 workers were laid off in January 2021. In 2022, Penn announced plans to eventually build a second hotel tower, part of a $206 million expansion which will also add meeting space. The new tower opened on December 1, 2025, after nearly two years of construction. The casino floor was also revamped in mid-2025.

== Features ==
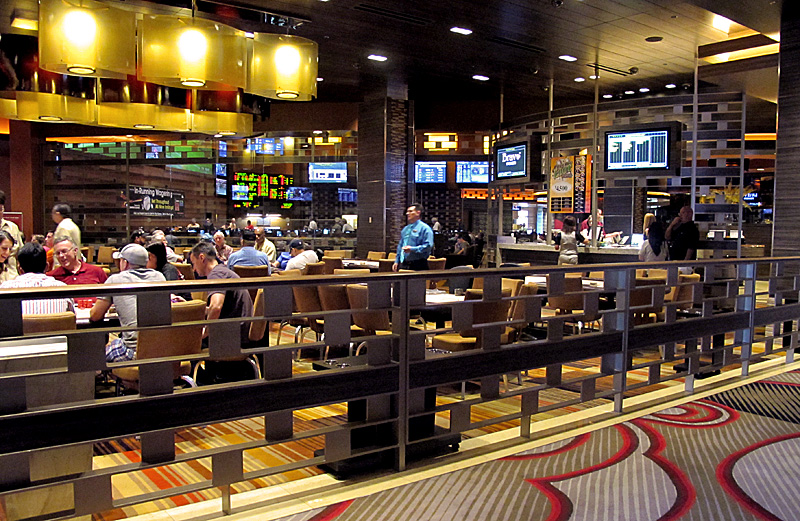
Poker room in 2010

The M Resort features a modern design. Marnell oversaw every detail of the property. Glass designs are prominent throughout the resort. The hotel opened with 390 rooms, located in a 16-story tower. The second tower brought the room count to 765. It was built southeast of the existing tower, and both are connected. The resort also includes a spa.

When it opened, the M's 92,000 sq ft (8,500 m^{2}) casino included 64 table games, and 1,847 slot machines. Penny slots made up 45 percent of the slot inventory. The casino also included a poker room, and a sportsbook operated by Cantor Gaming. Cantor compared its sportsbook operation to a Wall Street trading floor. The book offered portable devices that allowed people to place bets from anywhere in the resort. The book also allowed bets to be placed in the middle of a sports game.

When it opened, certain areas of the casino floor featured free self-serve soda fountains. The casino also included a pharmacy for gamblers to get their prescriptions filled, and customers had the option of using slot club points to cover the costs. The pharmacy idea came from Marnell, in an effort to attract retirees, who made up a substantial portion of Henderson's population. The property includes a gas station, which also accepted slot points as a form of payment.

The M Pavilion was added in 2012, expanding the resort's event space by 25,000 sq ft (2,300 m^{2}), for a total of 85,000 sq ft (7,900 m^{2}). In 2013, the casino hosted Penn's annual Hollywood Poker Open tournament. The poker room closed later that year, and was replaced by a slot tournament area, although the casino continued to host poker tournaments in other areas of the property. William Hill took over sportsbook operations in 2019.

=== Pool and entertainment ===
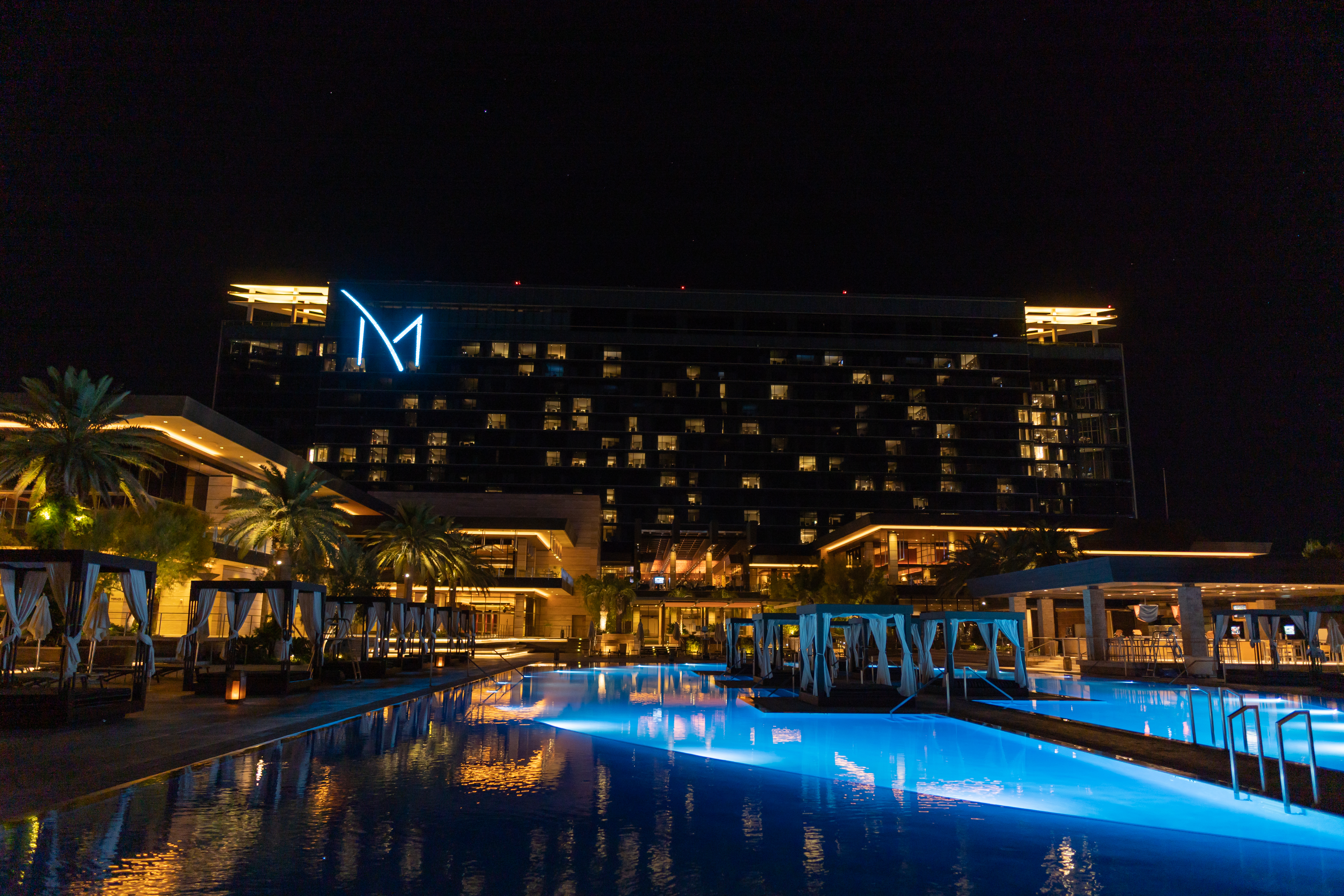
Pool area

Many of the resort's facilities surround a pool area and a permanent outdoor music venue; the latter is uncommon for a locals casino, but Marnell wanted to include such a feature for ambiance. The cost of dismantling a temporary venue was another factor. The venue is 1,500 sq ft (140 m^{2}), and the pool area can accommodate 6,000 people. The outdoor venue would provide much of the resort's live entertainment. The casino also included the 220-seat Ravello Lounge, which would offer a variety of free live bands. During its first year, the M struggled to secure top entertainers for its outdoor venue, in part because of the resort's distance away from the Las Vegas Strip.

The resort hosts pool parties known as Daydream, which are primarily targeted at local residents. By 2019, the resort had increased the number of live, indoor performances.

=== Restaurants and bars ===
The M Resort opened with nine restaurants, and five bars. Marnell owned and managed the restaurants and bars, unlike most casino properties which outsource them to third parties. Among the alcohol outlets is the Hostile Grape wine bar, offering more than 100 varieties. An Italian restaurant, Marinelli's, served dishes based on recipes by Marnell's grandmother.

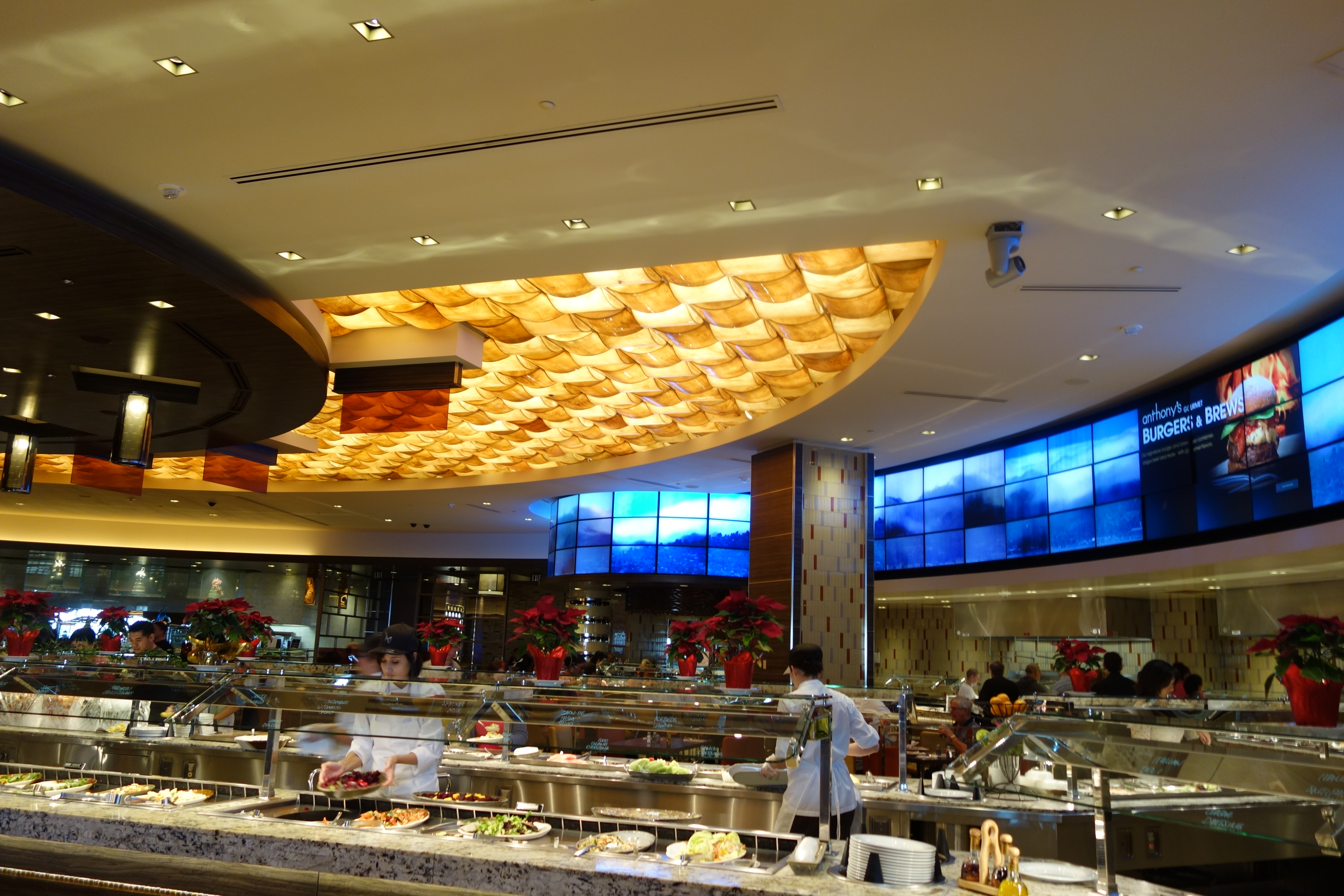
Studio B buffet

The Studio B Show Kitchen Buffet offered seating for 500 people, and included space for live cooking demonstrations. The buffet has been well received since its opening. Each restaurant, except the buffet, includes outdoor seating. Upon opening, the resort included a steakhouse and oyster bar known as Terzetto. A new steakhouse and seafood restaurant was later opened, under the name Anthony's Prime Steak & Seafood. It was named after Marnell. A 24-hour coffee shop, Red Cup Cafe, was closed in July 2010. It was replaced by a Hash House a go go, which was operated independently from Marnell.

One of the M's original restaurants, Veloce Cibo, operated on the top floor of the hotel tower and overlooked the Las Vegas Strip to the north. It offered a variety of regional dishes. In November 2011, Marnell decided to close Veloce Cibo due to poor revenue. He liked the restaurant and said that closing it was among the most difficult decisions he had to make for the resort. The space was converted into an area for special events, becoming much more profitable. A new restaurant and cocktail lounge, known as 16 — A Handcrafted Experience, opened on the top floor in 2018.

In 2013, chef Seonkyoung Longest won the reality television series Restaurant Express, which was produced in affiliation with the M Resort. As a result of her victory on the show, Longest won a restaurant space in the resort. She opened an Asian restaurant, Jayde Fuzion, in December 2013. Longest departed a few months later to pursue other interests, but the restaurant remained open, eventually offering an all-you-can-eat format.

In 2021, as part of the Raiders partnership, the M opened Raiders Tavern & Grill. The 8,000 sq ft (740 m^{2}) space includes two bars, a restaurant, and various Raiders merchandise. It replaced Jayde Fuzion. In 2022, the resort partnered with the Henderson Silver Knights to open another sports-themed bar, the Knight Time Hockey Bar.

=== Accolades ===
In 2009 and 2010, the M received a four-star rating from Forbes Travel Guide. As of 2017, it had won this and the AAA Four-Diamond Award every year since its opening. Readers of the Las Vegas Review-Journal also ranked it among the top 10 locals casinos in 2014.
