= Rachel Miskowiec =

American television producer

Rachel Miskowiec is an American television producer who took over as executive producer of The Real in 2015. . She won two Emmys. She was named as executive producer of Dr. Drew's Lifechangers in 2011. She was also named to produce Katie in 2013, replacing Michael Morrison. She has been a producer of The Tyra Banks Show and Good Morning America.

== Background ==
Miskowiec graduated with a B.A. in theater from Michigan State University in 1992.
