= Seonkyoung Longest =

Korean-American chef

- Born: Seoul, South Korea
- Spouse: Jacob Longest (m. 2009)
- Culinary career
- Cooking style: Asian
- Television show
- Culinary Class Wars

Seonkyoung Longest is a South Korean celebrity chef. She won the competition for Robert Irvine's Restaurant Express. Unlike her other competitors (besides Jan Charles), she was a self-taught home cook. She was also a "White Spoon" (veteran) contestant on the 2024 Netflix series Culinary Class Wars.

== Early life ==
Seonkyoung grew up about an hour from Seoul, South Korea, in a family that ran an organic farm with an onsite restaurant. Her parents, both working, emphasized farm-to-fork practices long before they became mainstream. Her father raised around 300 pigs and chickens organically, feeding them farm-produced, non-GMO food.

Seonkyoung was interested in illustration from a young age, and started her career while attending high school. She trained as a cartoonist by working for a famous Korean cartoonist, Lee Hyun-se, helping in the production of his publications.

Her interests then moved to performance art and dance. She became a member of the Seoul Street Artist group and entered competitions as a professional belly dancer.

She met her husband Jacob in Seoul, Korea, and moved to the United States in 2009.

== Career ==
After moving to the US, food became an escape from day-to-day boredom. She began watching Food Network and creating meals with her own style.

As the result of her victory in a food competition show on Food Network in December 2013, she opened and became Executive Chef of Jayde Fuzion restaurant at the M Resort in Las Vegas, featuring a mixture of Japanese, Chinese and Korean small plates.

She left the restaurant after four months as she realized that her true passion was with her own cooking show on Youtube "Asian at Home". She stars in and produces Asian at Home, an Asian food show and website geared at teaching simple methods for mastering Asian Cuisine.

In 2024, she also starred on the Netflix South Korean cooking competition series Culinary Class Wars as one of the 20 "White Spoon" (veteran) contestants.

== Personal life ==
Seonkyoung Longest was born and raised in South Korea, where she met her future husband Jacob Longest. They were married in Las Vegas in the presence of her mother and stepfather. She has been living in the U.S. since March 2009.
