= The CW Daytime =

Daytime programming block on The CW (2006–2021)

The CW Daytime was the unofficial branding for an afternoon programming block that was broadcast on The CW. It was originally branded as Daytime WB, which aired on one of its predecessors, The WB, from January 2, 2006 to September 15, 2006. The CW programmed the block from September 18, 2006 until October 1, 2021.

Officially, the network preferred affiliates to air the program featured from 3:00 p.m. to 4:00 p.m. in each time zone, though some affiliates aired it in differing timeslots, mainly stations with much more successful afternoon schedules with other programming which found The CW's hour stunted their ratings. The CW Plus stations in the Central and Mountain Time Zones also aired the show an hour earlier or later, depending on the local time zone.

In September 2021, The CW expanded to a seven-night-a-week prime time schedule with the addition of two hours on Saturday evenings. In exchange, the network ceded its weekday hour of daytime programming over to its affiliates, ending a combined 26-year commitment between The WB and The CW to daytime programming.

== History ==
=== Origins ===
The logo for Daytime WB. Used in 2006.

The CW Daytime originated as a block on The WB called Daytime WB, which launched on January 2, 2006. The block's creation traces back to the former holder of its timeslot, Kids' WB, which began sharing several of its programs with the animation-oriented Cartoon Network following the Turner Broadcasting System's 1996 merger with Time Warner. Cartoon Network soon began to compete in-house with their Toonami block, and later, Miguzi in 2004. Additional competition in the afternoon timeslot from Viacom's Nickelodeon and Disney Channel soon pushed out Kids' WB's prime broadcast competitor, Fox Kids, from weekdays, and the complications of broadcast regulations on children's programming soon had netlet stations pushing for different options to retain advertising revenue, including from The WB. This mainly included broad-appeal programming such as talk shows and sitcom reruns, and The WB's affiliate base began agitating to move away from weekday children's programming.

On May 31, 2005, The WB announced the discontinuation of Kids' WB's weekday block effective at the end of the year on December 31. Kids' WB continued to air weekdays after this, but with a more obvious push of its existing audience towards Miguzi and the Saturday morning Kids' WB lineup during the transition. After Daytime WB premiered, Kids' WB's Saturday block was expanded by one hour, running from 7:00 a.m. to noon in all time zones.

=== Move to The CW ===
The block moved to The CW, which replaced The WB in after its rival network UPN merged with them on September 18, 2006, under the unofficial brand The CW Daytime. On-air promotions for the afternoon block (which aired quite rarely) did not refer to the block by a formal brand name. The only description given by the network's website in the past was that it was a "Monday-Friday afternoon block from 3:00 p.m. to 5:00 p.m. (ET/PT)".

In the 2010s, the majority of The CW's stations aired NBCUniversal-syndicated talk shows such as Jerry Springer, The Steve Wilkos Show and Maury, along with court shows and other talk programming from other distributors during daytime hours outside of the network daytime block. After around 2010, The CW's website and social media channels made no mention of The CW Daytime in any form, and outside of promos distributed to the network's affiliates and occasional network promotions in primetime (usually only at the start of the television season), the responsibilities and burden of promotion were largely held by the producers of the program featured in the timeslot. It was effectively a minor, yet compulsory element of the network's schedule for affiliates to carry. The programs were also never available through The CW's website or apps for later streaming.

Starting in the fall of 2008, Warner Bros. Domestic Television Distribution began holding the program responsibilities for the block. At that point, when Toonzai block premiered, 4Kids broadcast an annual preview special prior to the launch of the new schedule in September. The debut of Kamen Rider: Dragon Knight from the CW4Kids block aired in early September 2009 to promote the series. Another preview special aired in 2010 upon the rename of the block to Toonzai, as well as the pilot for Tai Chi Chasers in 2011.

=== Reduction to one hour ===
On September 7, 2009, the Warner Bros.-distributed The Tyra Banks Show moved from first-run syndication exclusively to The CW Daytime, with a repeat "best-of" episode airing in the first hour of the block, while a new episode aired in the second hour. Tyra Banks announced the discontinuation of the series in December 2009, with the program ending its run in May 2010.

For the 2010–2011 season, the network aired one repeat "best-of" episode of Banks' show each day until September 16, 2011 – as The CW had cut its weekday daytime down to one hour that season, retaining the 3:00 p.m. start time (the 4:00 p.m. hour was given back to The CW's affiliates, the vast majority of whom filled the slot with syndicated programming). For the 2011–2012 television season, Dr. Drew's Lifechangers, a daytime talk show produced by Warner Bros. subsidiary Telepictures (which also produced Tyra), aired an original episode in the first half-hour, and an encore in the second until September 14, 2012, following the show's cancellation due to Pinsky focusing more on his nightly series Dr. Drew On Call on HLN. Since that point, the "CW Daytime" branding ceased to be referred to in any on-air form by the network and the show airing in the slot was referred to as '(program name), on The CW'.

=== Tribune Broadcasting offerings ===
The Bill Cunningham Show (produced by Tribune Broadcasting and UK-based ITV Studios), which had been airing mainly on Tribune's stations (alongside a few owned by Local TV and Raycom Media) during the 2011–2012 season, replaced Lifechangers on September 17, 2012.

On May 27, 2016, in interviews with local Cincinnati media, Cunningham stated that he would no longer continue with The Bill Cunningham Show into the 2016-17 season due to a grinding taping schedule and a three-year extension that he could not agree to, leaving the fate of the network's daytime slot in doubt.

On June 20, 2016, the replacement series for Cunningham was named. The Robert Irvine Show, featuring Food Network personality Robert Irvine, was also produced by Tribune, this time in association with Irwin Entertainment, and debuted on September 12, 2016. Tribune's agreement to program the timeslot ran concurrent with a new five-year CW affiliation agreement, ending in September 2021. However, the show had very low ratings and almost no promotion, and Tribune decided not to continue production of the series in the 2018-19 season.

==== Rerun era and discontinuation ====
On June 13, 2018, an article from Broadcasting & Cable named the replacement for Irvine; reruns and unaired episodes of Jerry Springer, which stopped producing new episodes in spring 2018. The CW also had a contractual right to ask for newly-produced episodes, though this was never executed. It is unknown what arrangements Tribune Media made with NBCUniversal Television Distribution and The CW to allow the Jerry Springer reruns to air. At the time of the agreement, Tribune was in the process of an acquisition by Sinclair Broadcast Group (which was later terminated outright); both broadcast chains had concurrently served as the largest syndicated group of stations carrying Jerry Springer. The same arrangement continued for the 2019-20 and 2020-21 seasons, with those repeats often serving as a complement to Springer's new syndicated courtroom series Judge Jerry (the default schedule for The CW Plus featured those repeats as a lead-in), and after Tribune's merger with Nexstar Media Group, which now makes up the largest affiliate base for the network.

On May 13, 2021, it was announced that The CW would return the Monday through Friday 3:00 to 4:00 pm hour to its affiliates in exchange for expanding its primetime programming to Saturday nights that September.

== Former programming ==
- 8 Simple Rules (2006)
- ER (2006)
- Reba (2006–2008)
- What I Like About You (2006–2008)
- All of Us (2007–2008)
- The Jamie Foxx Show (2008–2009)
- The Wayans Bros. (2008–2009)
- Judge Jeanine Pirro (2008–2009)
- The Tyra Banks Show (September 7, 2009–May 28, 2010, with reruns until September 16, 2011)
- Lifechangers (September 19, 2011–May 18, 2012, with reruns until September 14, 2012)
- The Bill Cunningham Show (September 17, 2012–September 9, 2016)
- The Robert Irvine Show (September 12, 2016–May 25, 2018, with reruns until September 7, 2018)
- Jerry Springer (reruns, 2018–2021)
