= Lifechangers =

American talk show (2011–2012)

- Genre: Talk show
- Created by: Lisa Gregorisch-Dempsey
- Presented by: Drew Pinsky
- Country of origin: United States
- Original language: English
- No. of seasons: 1
- No. of episodes: Unknown

Production
- Running time: 20–22 minutes
- Production companies: Dr. Drew Productions; Lisa G. Productions; Telepictures Productions; Warner Bros. Domestic Television Distribution

Original release
- Network: The CW
- Release: September 19, 2011 – May 18, 2012

Lifechangers is an American half-hour daytime talk show hosted by Drew Pinsky. It premiered on September 19, 2011, as part of The CW Daytime.

== Overview ==
The show featured Drew Pinsky and a panel of experts including celebrities and doctors, helping ordinary people who are dealing with conflicts in their lives, which could include relationship or addiction issues.

== Development ==
It was announced in April 2011 that The CW had ordered Lifechangers to series. The show aired on weekdays at 3:00 ET/2:00 CT on The CW stations as part of The CW Daytime block, replacing The Tyra Banks Show repeats which aired during the 2010–2011 television season. An original episode aired in the first half-hour and an encore telecast in the second one. It was announced on August 4, 2011 that Maria Menounos will have on-air duties on the show.

== Production ==
Lifechangers was produced by Warner Bros.' Telepictures Productions. Drew Pinsky served as executive producer alongside Lisa Gregorisch-Dempsey, who also created the series, and Howard Lapides. It was announced in March that former The Tyra Banks Show producer Rachel Miskowiec will co-produce.

== Cancellation ==
The series was cancelled after one season in May 2012 and was replaced on September 17, 2012 by Tribune Broadcasting/ITV Studios's The Bill Cunningham Show.
