= Katie (talk show) =

American syndicated talk show (2012–2014)

- Genre: Talk show
- Created by: Katie Couric
- Directed by: Joseph Terry (season 1)
- Presented by: Katie Couric
- Opening theme: "This Day" performed by Sheryl Crow
- Country of origin: United States
- Original language: English
- No. of seasons: 2
- No. of episodes: 327

Production
- Executive producers: Katie Couric; Rachel Miskowiec; Michael Morrison
- Running time: 42 minutes
- Production companies: KAC Productions; Disney–ABC Domestic Television

Original release
- Network: Syndication
- Release: September 10, 2012 – July 30, 2014

Katie is an American talk show that aired in syndication from September 10, 2012 to July 30, 2014. It was hosted by former ABC News and Yahoo News correspondent Katie Couric. It premiered on September 10, 2012, with the second season debut on September 9, 2013. On December 19, 2013, Disney–ABC Domestic Television and Katie Couric mutually agreed to cancel the show. The last show was taped on June 12, 2014 and the series finale aired on July 30, 2014.

== Format ==
Katie covered news and topics "that people care about". It was essentially a lifestyle show, but with news components to reflect Couric's background and interests. During an interview on The Tonight Show with Jay Leno in 2011, Couric said that she expected the show to cover various issues and be a mixture of The Oprah Winfrey Show and Today.

When launching the show, Couric had incorporated her affiliation with the ABC News division into her talk show. Colleagues Christiane Amanpour, Deborah Roberts, Sam Champion, Leo Jean, Matt Gutman, Richard Besser, Marci Gonzalez, Jim Avila, Dan Abrams, Josh Elliot, Brian Ross, and ABC World News Anchor Diane Sawyer made appearances on her show to report on events related to news. Couric had The View co-host Whoopi Goldberg, Kelly Ripa and Michael Strahan of Live! with Kelly and Michael, and some cast members of the soap opera General Hospital come on the show.

== Production ==
On June 6, 2011, it was announced that Katie Couric had signed up a deal with Disney–ABC Television Group for a syndicated talk show that would premiere in September 2012 and be distributed by Disney–ABC Domestic Television. In the process, ABC announced intentions to relinquish to its affiliates the final hour of its daytime programming lineup (3–4 p.m. Eastern Time), occupied at the time by the soap opera General Hospital, to make room for the new program. The decision was made due to resistance from ABC affiliates to air Katie at 4:00 p.m. (ET) because many of them expanded their local newscasts during the timeslot after The Oprah Winfrey Show went off the air in 2011.

In March 2012, Couric and Zucker reportedly expressed concern to ABC executives about having the ABC Daytime talk show The Revolution as a possible lead-in to Katie due to the program's stagnant ratings and concerns of potential fan outcry should the launch of Katie result in the cancellation of General Hospital. On April 11, 2012, ABC decided to keep General Hospital on the air, while effectively canceling The Revolution. ABC later announced that General Hospital would be moving to the 2 p.m. (ET) timeslot starting September 10, 2012, thus making it the lead-in for Katie on most of the ABC stations carrying the program. The first official promo for the show was released on June 14, 2012.

Katie premiered on Monday, September 10, 2012. The show aired at 3:00 p.m. (ET) on all eight ABC owned-and-operated stations (O&O), as part of their local schedules. Approximately 96 percent of the affiliates that carried the show in the 50 top U.S markets were ABC stations. Although affiliates were encouraged to air Katie during the 3:00 p.m. timeslot (ET), the actual airtime of the program varied from one market to another. The executive producer of the program was former NBCUniversal CEO and former executive producer of Today, Jeff Zucker. He left the show in January 2013 to join CNN.

In Canada, Katie ran nationwide on the City network at 4:00 p.m. (ET/PT). On January 30, 2013, Katie was renewed for a second and final season. On December 19, 2013, it was announced that Couric and Disney-ABC agreed to cancel Katie after two seasons. In a statement, Disney-ABC and Couric said: "We've mutually agreed that there will not be a third season of the show. We're very proud of everyone’s contributions to making Katie the No. 1 new syndicated talk show of 2012-13, and we look forward to the rest of the season."

Beginning in the 2013–14 television season, seven of the network's O&O stations (excluding KFSN-TV) and the network's San Antonio affiliate, KSAT-TV, decided to relocate General Hospital back to the 3:00 p.m. ET/2:00 p.m. CT timeslot via tape delay.

== Reception ==
=== Critical response ===
James Poniewozik of Time questioned Couric's decision to move to daytime television, believing that she was better suited on the morning talk show Today.

=== Awards and nominations ===
| Year | Award | Category | Result |
|---|---|---|---|
| 2013 | 39th People's Choice Awards | Favorite New Talk Show Host | Nominated |
| 2013 | 40th Daytime Emmy Awards | Daytime Emmy Award for Outstanding Talk Show Informative | Nominated |
| 2014 | 41st Daytime Emmy Awards | Daytime Emmy Award for Outstanding Talk Show Host | Won (tied) |
