= Restaurant Express =

- Starring: Robert Irvine
- Country of origin: United States
- Original language: English
- No. of seasons: 1
- No. of episodes: 7

Original release
- Network: Food Network
- Release: November 3 – December 15, 2013

Related
- Dinner: Impossible; Restaurant: Impossible

Restaurant Express is an American reality television program aired by the Food Network and hosted by Chef Robert Irvine. The series premiered on November 3, 2013.

== Contestants ==
Nine contestants competed in the premiere season.

Name	Age	Occupation	Hometown	Eliminated
Adam Goldgell	46	Executive chef	St. James, New York	Runner-Up
Ammerah Watson	27	Private chef	Atlanta, Georgia	Episode 1
Bianca Rose	35	Culinary school graduate and chef	Los Angeles, California	Episode 3
Eric Gitenstein	30	Chef and supper club owner	Phoenix, Arizona	Episode 5
Jan Charles	44	Home cook	Greeneville, Tennessee	Episode 7
Johnathan Hurley	31		Los Angeles, California	Episode 2
Kimmy Moy	46	Waitress	Las Vegas, Nevada	Episode 1
Patrick Ruocco	34	Private chef	Danville, Virginia	Episode 4
Seonkyoung Longest	29	Home cook	Columbus, Mississippi	Winner

== Episodes ==
No.	Title	Sent home	Highest seller	Original release date
1	"Vegas Meltdown"	Ammerah, Kimmy	Patrick	November 3, 2013
2	"Tantrum in Temecula"	Johnathan	Eric	November 10, 2013
3	"Express: Impossible"	Bianca	N/A	November 17, 2013
4	"Battle by the Beach"	Patrick	Eric	November 24, 2013
5	"Going, Going, Gone!"	Eric	Adam	December 1, 2013
6	"The Truck Stops Here!"	None	Adam	December 8, 2013
7	"Vegas or Bust"	N/A	N/A	December 15, 2013
Jan and Seonkyoung compete in a cook-off, with Seonkyoung winning, earning her the right to compete against Adam in the final competition. Ultimately, Seonkyoung is declared the winner of Restaurant Express.
