= The Tyra Banks Show =

American talk show (2005–2010)

- Also known as: Tyra; The Tyra Show
- Created by: Tyra Banks
- Presented by: Tyra Banks
- Opening theme: "Just for Today" by India Arie (2005–2007) "All That I Got (The Make Up Song) [Remix]" by Fergie (2007–2009) "I'm Coming Out" (Remix) by Diana Ross (2009–2010)
- Country of origin: United States
- Original language: English
- No. of seasons: 5
- No. of episodes: 810

Production
- Executive producers: Tyra Banks; Benny Medina; Kerrie Moriarity; Rachel Miskowiec; John Redmann; Alex Duda
- Running time: 60 minutes
- Production companies: Handprint Entertainment (2005–2007) (seasons 1–2); Bankable Productions; Telepictures Productions; Warner Bros. Domestic Television Distribution

Original release
- Network: Syndication (2005–2009); The CW (2009–2010)
- Release: September 12, 2005 – May 28, 2010

The Tyra Banks Show, also known as and shortened to Tyra or The Tyra Show, is an American talk show hosted by Tyra Banks that aired from 2005 to 2010.

While Banks's show covered a variety of topics, there was a sensationalized focus on current issues facing women, with often special episodes on America's Next Top Model, which Banks herself had also created. In its later seasons, it took on a tabloid format similar to shows such as Maury and The Montel Williams Show, covering topics such as people with odd psychological problems, among other subjects as it was already replacing Ricki Lake especially on Fox Television Stations and The WB 100+ Station Group moving Tyra into Ricki’s old timeslot. According to Variety (magazine), it was another attempt to replace Ricki Lake.

The show was aired in many countries as it had been replacing Ricki Lake, and also remained available on XM Satellite Radio's Take Five channel in both the United States and Canada.

== History ==
=== 2005–2009: Syndication ===
The Tyra Banks Show premiered on September 12, 2005 in front of a live-to-tape audience at CBS Television City in Los Angeles, California.

In summer 2007, the show moved to New York City, where it was taped in the Chelsea Studios formerly occupied by Ricki Lake's program, being recorded in front of a live-to-tape audience at Chelsea Studios and Bankable Productions in New York City. The final five all-new episodes from Los Angeles were aired the week of September 3, 2007 and followed by the 3rd-season premiere on following week, September 10, 2007 in New York City.

On December 19, 2007, the show was renewed an additional two seasons in syndication, 2008–2009 and 2009–2010. The fourth season began on September 8, 2008. However, in November 2008, Warner Bros. announced the program would move to The CW network's daytime block in September 2009, with both an archive episode and a first-run episode airing daily. As The CW was already airing ANTM, network officials saw the move as a "strategic alignment of interests for The CW's stations", as both shows thus aired on the same channel nationwide.

=== 2009–2010: The CW and cancellation ===
On September 7, 2009, Tyra made its debut on The CW, with a new logo and new music, a remixed version of "I'm Coming Out" by Diana Ross.

On December 28, 2009, it was announced that Season 5 would be the show's last. The final episode aired on May 28, 2010. The finale featured many special guest stars which included Mike Epps, Cheryl Tiegs, Miley Cyrus, LL Cool J, Rihanna, Michael Rapaport, and Robbi Morgan.

=== Reruns ===
During the 2010–2011 television season, repeats aired on weekdays at 3:00–4:00pm on The CW affiliates until September 16, 2011.

== Reception ==
=== Awards and nominations ===
On June 20, 2008, The Tyra Banks Show won a Daytime Emmy Award for Outstanding Talk Show Informative.

On August 30, 2009, The Tyra Banks Show won another Daytime Emmy Award for Outstanding Talk Show Informative, beating out Dr. Phil and The Doctors.

In 2010, The Tyra Banks Show was nominated for a GLAAD Media Award for "Outstanding Talk Show Episode" for the episode "Hell to Pay – Gay Teen Exorcism" during the 21st GLAAD Media Awards.
