= The Bill Cunningham Show =

American tabloid talk show (2011–2016)

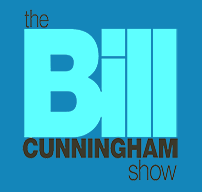
- Genre: Talk show
- Presented by: Bill Cunningham
- Country of origin: United States
- Original language: English
- No. of seasons: 5
- No. of episodes: 650

Production
- Executive producer: Kim Brechka
- Camera setup: Multiple
- Running time: 42 minutes
- Production companies: ITV Studios America; Tribune Studios

Original release
- Network: Syndication (Season 1); The CW (Seasons 2-5)
- Release: September 19, 2011 – September 9, 2016

The Bill Cunningham Show is an American television tabloid talk show hosted by radio host Bill Cunningham which aired for four of its five seasons on The CW as part of that network's daytime hour. The Bill Cunningham Show, produced by ITV Studios America, debuted on September 19, 2011, and lasted until September 9, 2016. In the first season before the move to the CW, the program had limited distribution, airing only on Tribune Broadcasting owned stations, such as KAUT-TV—Oklahoma City, WGNT–Norfolk, and Raycom Media-owned WXIX-TV in Cunningham's hometown of Cincinnati. The show premiered the same day as the American iteration of Jeremy Kyle, also produced by ITV Studios, but itself only running two seasons and in traditional syndication for its full run.

In February 2012, The CW announced that the program would be distributed nationwide for the 2012–13 season, as part of the network's CW Daytime lineup; the series made its CW debut on September 17, 2012, replacing Dr. Drew's Lifechangers.

In November 2013, The Bill Cunningham Show was renewed for a fourth season.

On May 27, 2016, Cunningham announced that he would not sign a new contract, resulting in cancellation of the show. The Robert Irvine Show, hosted by Robert Irvine, replaced it on September 12, 2016.

== Background ==
The series offers the traditional tabloid-style conflict-resolution format with Cunningham's conservative point of view on the subjects presented. An expert weighs in and comments with questions and comments from audience members. The hour-long show is taped in front of a live audience at NEP Broadcasting's Penn Studios. The show is produced by former Montel producer Kim Brechka.

== Ratings ==
In New York City, where the show airs locally on CW affiliate WPIX, The Bill Cunningham Show averaged a 0.7 in adults 18–49 in January — better than any other talk show in the market, across all timeslots. On February 9, 2012, it won its time slot with a 1.2 rating in adults 25–54 (it also finished first in that time slot in the demo in Los Angeles and Dallas). During the second week of the February 2012 sweeps period (through February 9), airings of The Bill Cunningham Show on WPIX averaged a 1.4 household rating.

== Cancellation ==
On May 27, 2016, Cunningham announced that he had opted not to sign a new contract to continue the show, citing a grinding taping schedule which included recording all episodes of the last season of the series between August and September 2015 before the season started, which kept him away from family in Cincinnati and disrupted the schedule for his WLW radio show. The new contract also included a non-negotiable three-year commitment that Cunningham was unable to agree to. The Robert Irvine Show, a talk show hosted by Food Network personality Robert Irvine, replaced it in September 2016.
