= The Robert Irvine Show =

American tabloid talk show (2016–2018)

- Genre: Talk show
- Presented by: Robert Irvine
- Country of origin: United States
- Original language: English
- No. of seasons: 2
- No. of episodes: 181

Production
- Production locations: The Burbank Studios, Burbank, California
- Running time: 60 minutes
- Production companies: Irwin Entertainment; Tribune Studios; Robert Irvine Productions

Original release
- Network: The CW
- Release: September 12, 2016 – May 24, 2018

The Robert Irvine Show is an American daytime talk show hosted by Robert Irvine and produced by Tribune Studios and Irwin Entertainment. The show premiered on The CW on September 12, 2016, as part of their late afternoon timeslot, and replaced Bill Cunningham's self-titled show after his television retirement. Like Cunningham, along with Irvine's Food Network series Restaurant: Impossible, it featured Irvine in the traditional conflict-resolution talk format trying to work out problems between subjects who came on the series.

Until the start of its second season in September 2017, it was the final program distributed by the American Big Five over-the-air networks to still be produced in standard definition, albeit in a widescreen format.

The show ceased production after its second season due to low ratings, with the final episode airing May 24, 2018 (a clip show one day later was the final regular episode), with repeats ending September 7. It was replaced by encore and unaired original episodes of Jerry Springer under an arrangement with Tribune Media and NBCUniversal Television Distribution.
