= Save Our Shelter =

American television series

Save Our Shelter is an unscripted television show that aired on The CW. The show was created by Rocky Kanaka, a humanitarian entrepreneur, actor and founder of Dog for Dog and The Dog Bakery. The show follows host Rocky Kanaka, master craftsman, Rob North, and a team of experts as they assist animal shelters and rescue facilities across the US and Canada. Each show reveals an update to the facility and tells the story of a pet adoption. The show premiered on October 3, 2015 as part of One Magnificent Morning, a five-hour block produced by Litton Entertainment and distributed by CBS Television Distribution, that would feature live-action educational programming geared towards teenagers and their parents.

The second season featured renovation expert Rob North, designer Emmanuel Belliveau, and director of Found Animals Aimee Gilbreath. Bissell Pet Foundation Cathy Bissell also appeared. (Bissell was a paid sponsor of the show.)

The show also aired in Canada on Corus owned CMT and ABC Spark.
