= Robert Irvine =

English-American celebrity chef (born 1965)

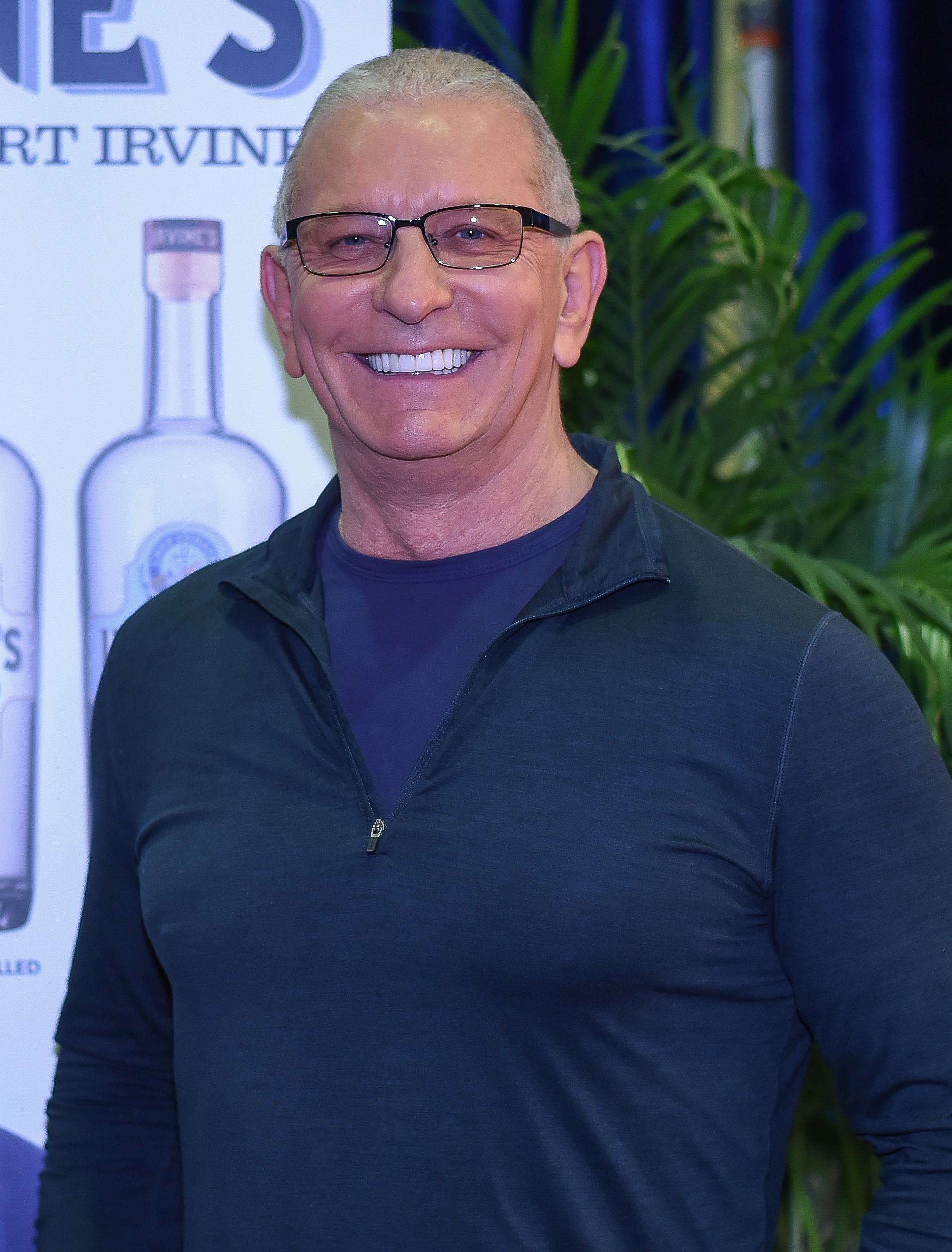
- Irvine in 2024
- Born: Robert Irvine; 24 September 1965 (age 61); Salisbury, Wiltshire, England
- Spouse(s): Karen Irvine (divorced) Gail Kim (m. 2012)
- Children: 2
- Culinary career
- Current restaurants
- Fresh Kitchen by Robert Irvine (The Pentagon, Arlington County, Virginia, US),
- Television shows
- The Globe; Dinner: Impossible; Worst Cooks in America; Restaurant: Impossible; Restaurant Express; All-Star Academy; A Hero's Welcome; Chopped: Impossible; Next Iron Chef; The Robert Irvine Show

Robert Paul Irvine (/ˈɜːrvaɪn/; born 24 September 1965) is an English-American celebrity chef and talk show host who has appeared on and hosted a variety of Food Network programs including Dinner: Impossible, Worst Cooks in America, Restaurant: Impossible, A Hero's Welcome, Operation Restaurant, All-Star Academy, Guy's Grocery Games, Chopped: Impossible, and Restaurant Express. Irvine currently operates one restaurant, Fresh Kitchen by Robert Irvine, located within The Pentagon. He also operated Robert Irvine's Public House at the Tropicana resort in Las Vegas, Nevada from 2017 until the closure of the Tropicana in 2024. Irvine launched The Robert Irvine Show, a daytime talk show which aired weekdays on The CW between 12 September 2016 and 25 May 2018.

== Early life ==
Irvine was born in Salisbury, UK. He began his cooking career upon enlisting in the UK's Royal Navy at the age of fifteen. Having completed culinary training, Irvine served aboard Her Majesty's Royal Yacht Britannia. Upon completion of his 10-year tour of duty, Irvine performed consultant work in Bali, Jakarta and Ho Chi Minh City before becoming Executive Chef aboard numerous cruise ships and establishments such as Trump's Taj Mahal, culminating with the five-star MS Crystal Harmony.

== Television career ==
=== 2006–2010, 2021–present; Dinner: Impossible ===
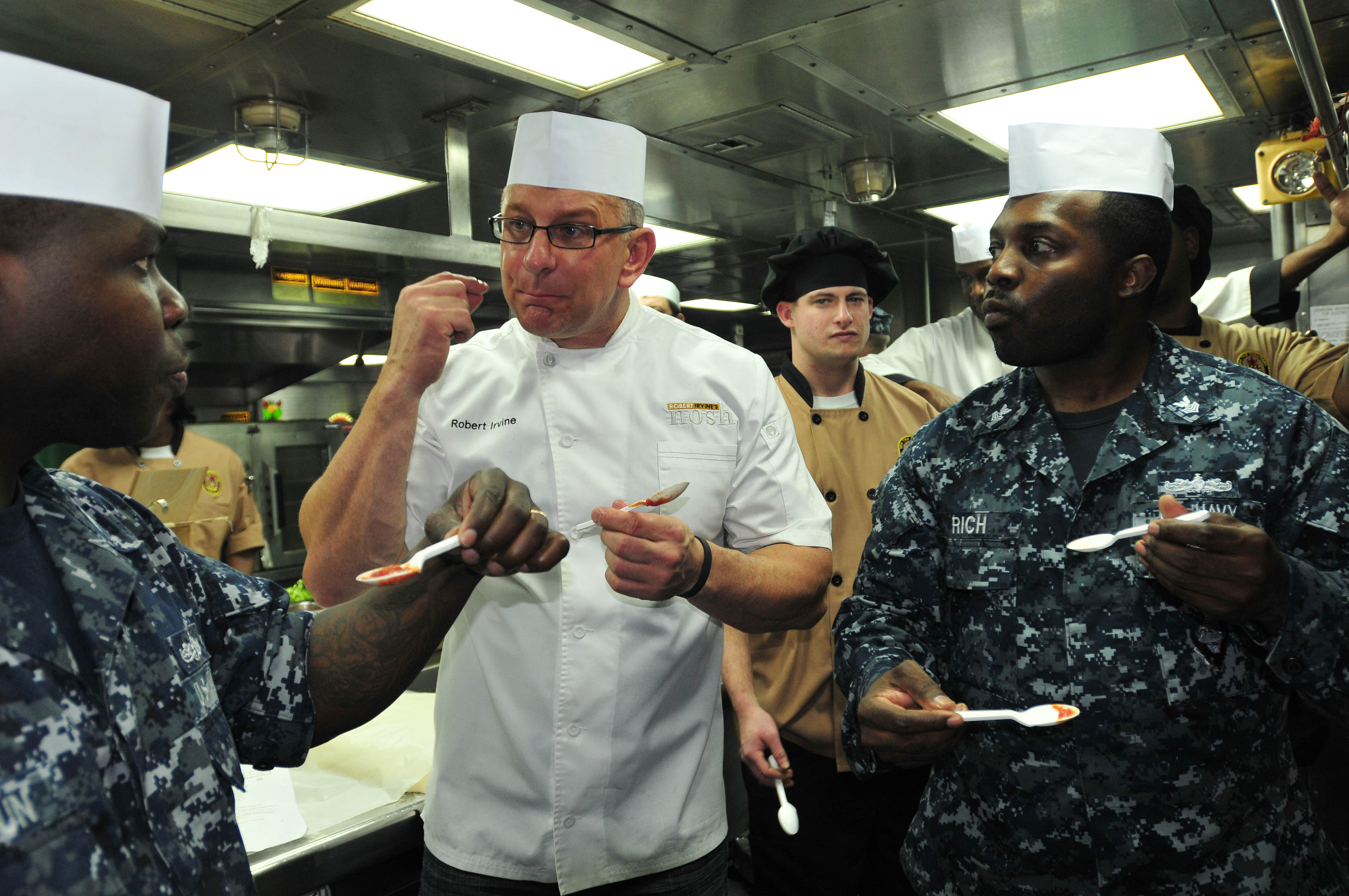
Irvine giving culinary advice to cooks aboard a US Navy ship in October 2012

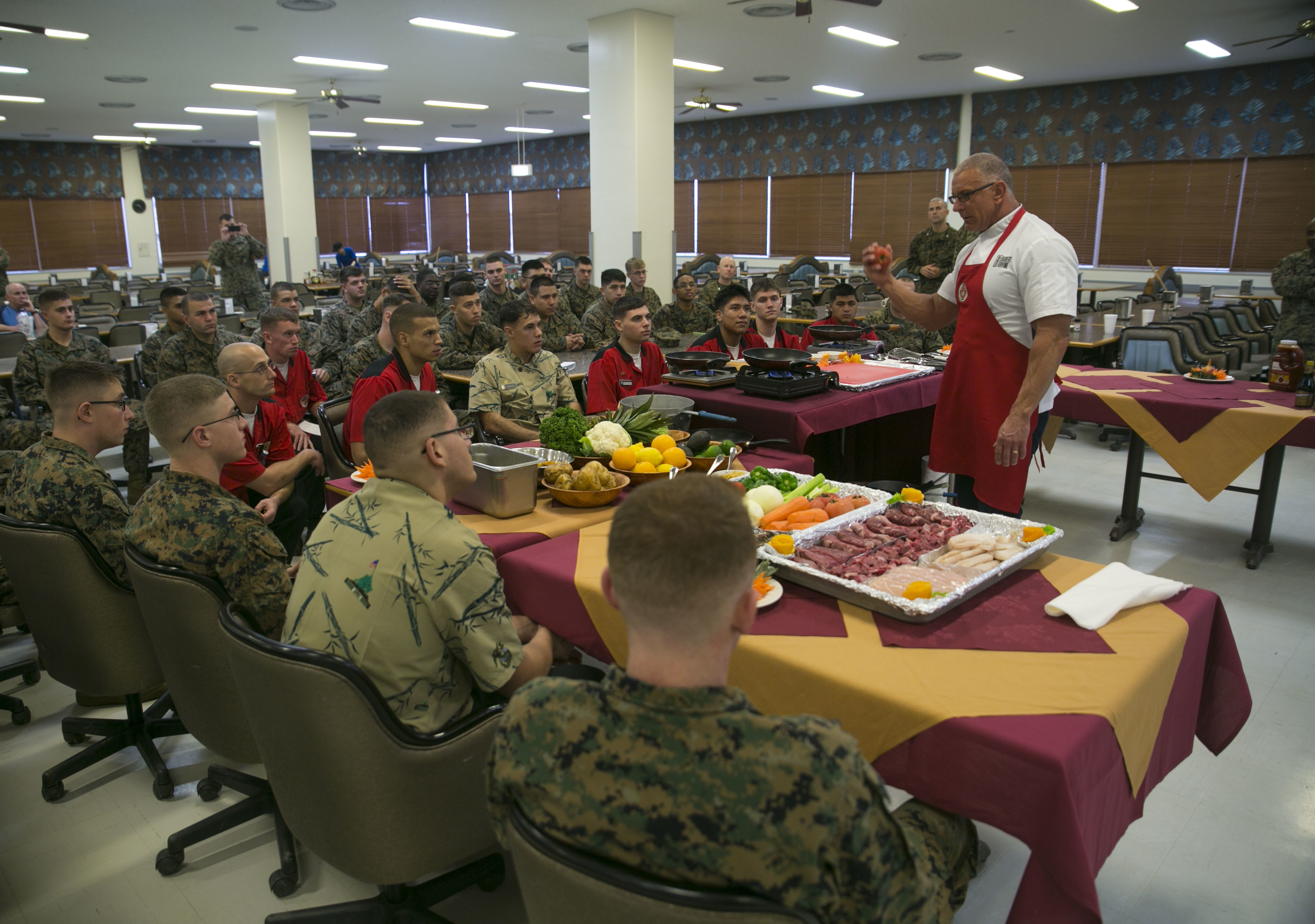
Irvine giving culinary advice to a group of US Marine Corps cooks in January 2015

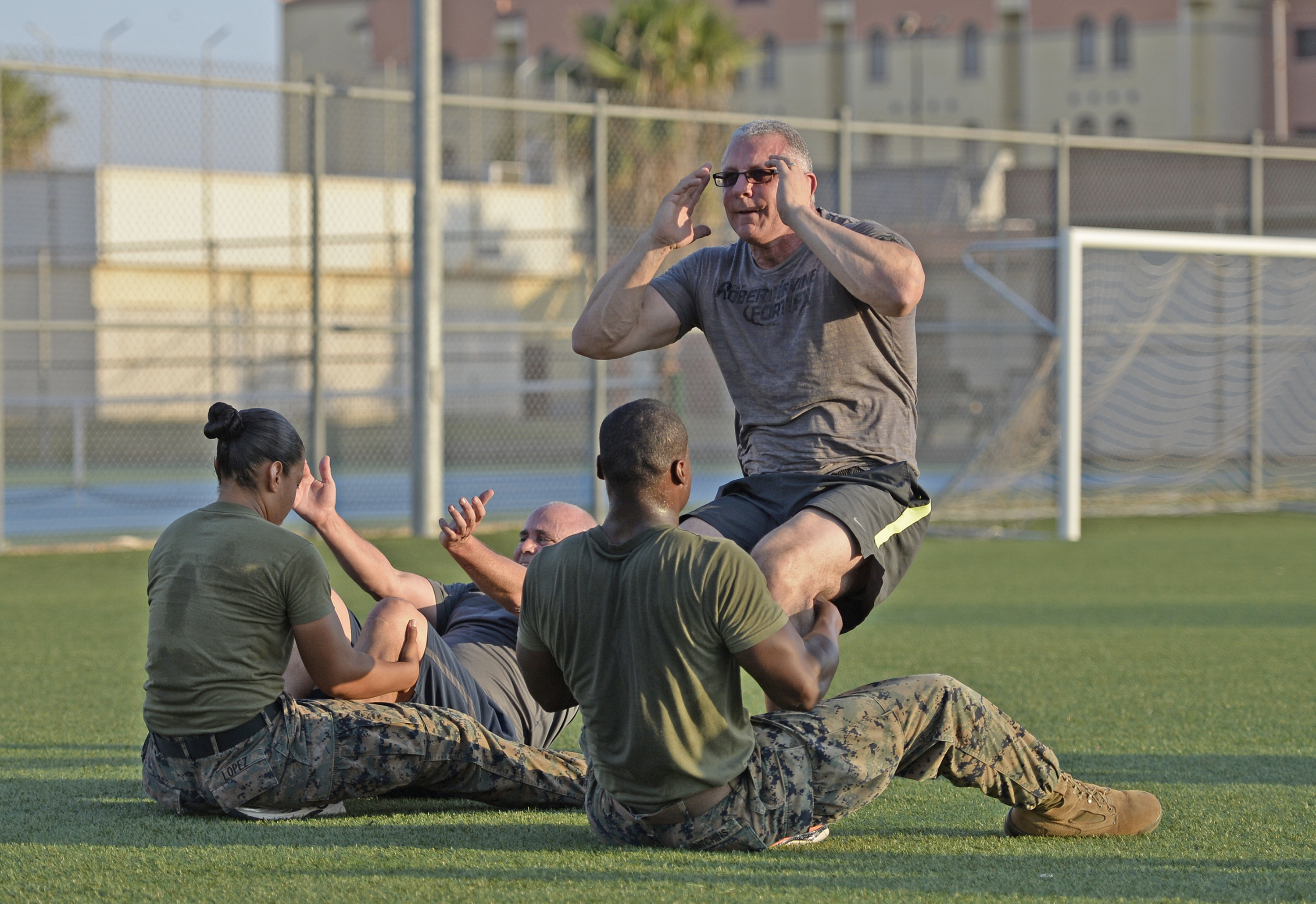
Irvine conducting calisthenics with US Marines at Sigonella, Italy, in July 2016

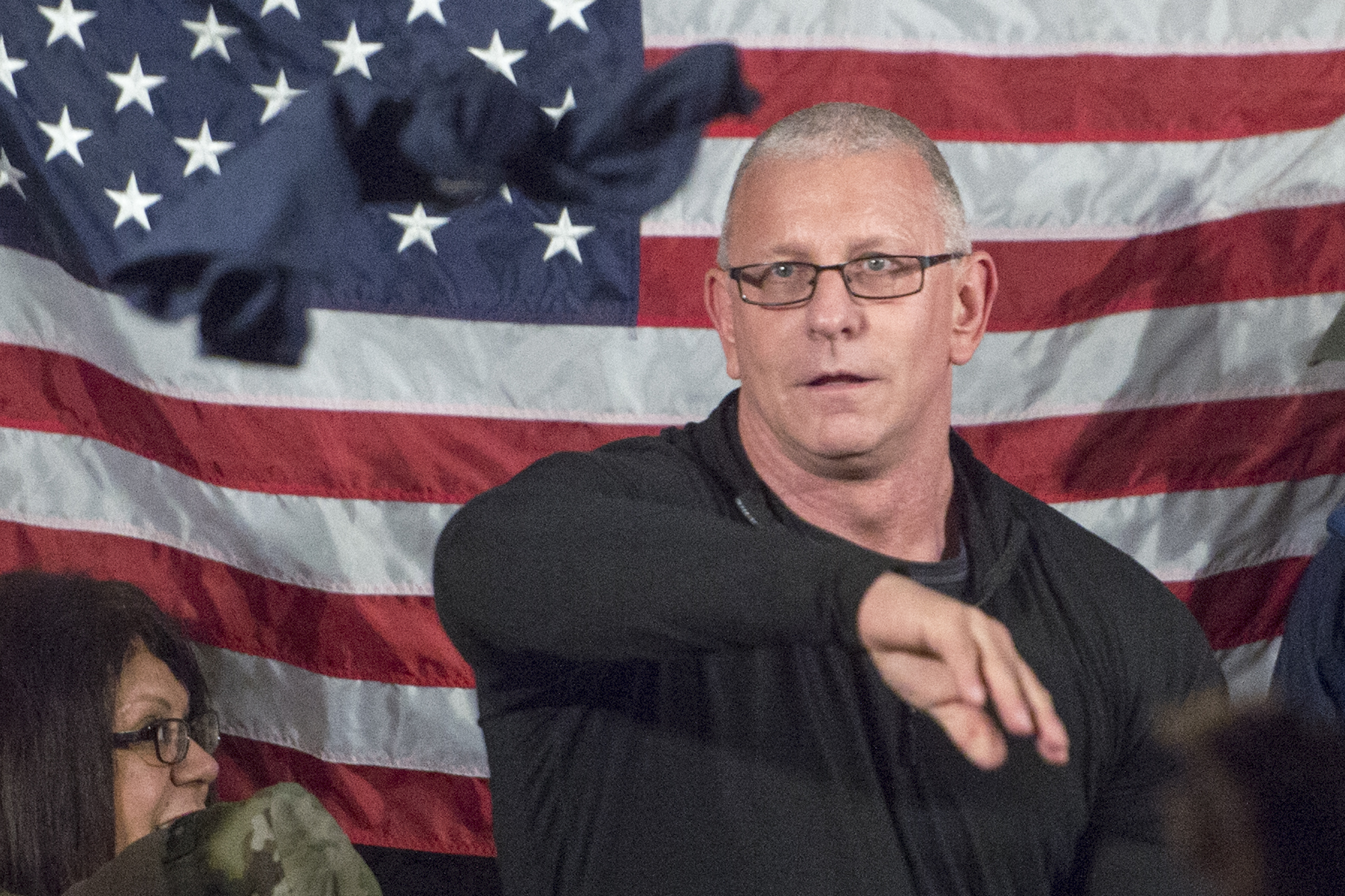
Irvine orating before members of the US military in December 2016

Irvine started his television career on Food Network on a show called Fit for a King, which was later re-titled before broadcast to Dinner: Impossible, where he would be given countless challenges over the course of the life of the show.

Irvine also appeared in a December 2007 episode of Iron Chef America with Tyler Florence in a dessert battle (theme ingredient: sugar) against Paula Deen and Cat Cora in which the men lost.

In 2006, Irvine had announced his intention to open two restaurants in St. Petersburg, Florida. Irvine had impressed a Florida socialite with the claims he was a Knight Commander of the Royal Victorian Order, had a degree in food and nutrition from the University of Leeds, had worked on the wedding cake for Prince Charles and Princess Diana and had served at the White House as a chef, a claim Irvine also made in the opening segment of his Food Network show, Dinner: Impossible. An article in the 17 February 2008 issue of the St. Petersburg Times quoted sources who disputed some of Irvine's assertions. As a result, Food Network pulled Irvine's biography from its website. Network spokesperson Lisa De Colle said they were "taking the necessary steps to ensure the accuracy of all representations of Robert".

In 2008, Irvine posted to his blog to "set the record straight" regarding his past service and point out erroneous reports made by the St. Petersburg Times. This included letters from those he worked with at the White House, including Rear Admiral Michael H. Miller, Deputy Assistant to the President and Director of the White House Military Office and F.X. Fuller, Director of Presidential Food Service.

On 29 February 2008, Food Network announced it would honour its contract with Irvine for a fourth season of thirteen episodes of Dinner: Impossible but was also looking for a replacement host for the series. On 21 April 2008, Food Network executives released a statement announcing they were expanding the Dinner: Impossible series to a one-hour format and replacing Irvine with recent Iron Chef America addition Michael Symon. The first Symon episode aired on 20 July 2008, but ran for 30 minutes and the season had only 10 episodes. Irvine returned to Dinner: Impossible in 2009. A Food Network spokesman stated "Our audience has continued to demonstrate its interest in and support for Robert. He has taken responsibility and made a conscious effort to clear the air, rebuild the relationship with Food Network and apologize for the earlier inaccuracies."

In March 2008, Irvine's business partner and landlord issued a joint statement announcing the chef had abandoned his plan to open the restaurants. The reasons cited were "the timing is not exactly right" and Irvine "cannot commit to spending at least four days a week" at the restaurant as he had planned. In the spring of 2008, Food Network restored Irvine's biography to its website. It reflected his service in the UK's Royal Navy and service on the Royal Yacht Britannia. He also appeared in an episode of The Next Food Network Star on 8 June 2008.

On 20 November 2008, Food Network announced that they had rehired Irvine to host six episodes of Dinner: Impossible with a scheduled air date in March 2009. The first episode of Irvine's new season aired on 8 April 2009, and was one hour in length. Irvine continued as host of Dinner: Impossible until it ceased production in 2010, following its eighth season.

On 11 March 2021, Dinner: Impossible returned to Food Network after an 11-year hiatus with 4 new episodes.

=== 2011–present; Worst Cooks in America and Restaurant: Impossible ===
Following the end of Dinner: Impossible (which relaunched in 2021), Irvine embarked on two new projects with Food Network. In late 2010, the Food Network began advertising the second season of Worst Cooks in America featuring Irvine (replacing Chef Beau MacMillan) training a cadre of would-be cooks in competition with Chef Anne Burrell. The show premiered on 3 January 2011. In advance of the show's premiere, Irvine teamed with Cat Cora to battle Burrell and Michael Symon in the special "Battle Deep Freeze" on Iron Chef America.

Irvine also appears in the restaurant make-over show, Restaurant: Impossible, which premiered on 19 January 2011. Described as a spin-off from Dinner: Impossible, Restaurant: Impossible challenges Irvine to make over a restaurant in two days with a budget of $10,000.

Irvine competed in Season 4 of The Next Iron Chef, which premiered on 30 October 2011. He was the second chef eliminated from the competition after losing a peanut secret-ingredient showdown against Chef Michael Chiarello. Starting on 3 November 2013, Irvine hosted a new Food network series called Restaurant Express. In this series, Irvine challenged nine chefs to a series of tests for a chance to open a restaurant in a Las Vegas, Nevada, spa and casino.

On 2 December 2012, Irvine appeared alongside Masaharu Morimoto and Ted Allen on the Battle Holiday Gingerbread episode of Iron Chef America representing Food Network against a team of Cooking Channel stars including Michael Symon, Nadia Giosia, and Ben Sargent. In the episode, Irvine removed his chef's coat, stating that he does not wear chef's coats very often. Iron Chef Michael Symon commented on this by saying that he had a bet that Irvine would remove his chef's coat after 25 minutes of the competition and that he lost because he removed it much earlier. Iron Chef Masaharu Morimoto also stated that Irvine removed his chef's coat to show off his muscles.

In September 2016, Irvine launched a daytime talk show which airs weekdays on The CW. Titled The Robert Irvine Show and produced by Tribune Studios and Irwin Entertainment, the series features Irvine in the traditional conflict-resolution talk format trying to work out problems between subjects who come on the series.

Irvine was also featured on Chopped, Guy's Grocery Games and others. In 2016, he appeared on All-Star Academy, where he mentored Natasha Clement to the finale where she won the $50,000 grand prize.

Irvine has starred in all seasons of Restaurant: Impossible. After a three-year hiatus from 2016 to 2019, Restaurant: Impossible returned with two brand-new seasons. The series is in its 17th season. In July 2019, Food Network also began airing Restaurant: Impossible: Revisited in which Irvine returns to restaurants previously featured on Restaurant: Impossible to interview the owners and check on their progress. In 2020, a spin-off series called Restaurant: Impossible Back in Business was launched, focusing on past restaurants featured on the original show and their struggles dealing with the COVID-19 pandemic.

In July 2020, Food Network announced a two-year multi-platform contract with Irvine leading new episodes of his series Restaurant: Impossible and developing mid- and short-form video segments for both linear and digital venues, including Food Network's Kitchen app.

In June 2021, Discovery+ announced a new series starring Irvine called The Globe. According to the network press release, Food Network President Courtney White said “Robert’s universal appeal paired with exceptional chefs who transform ingredients, some they have never worked with before, into incredible dishes is especially impressive and entertaining. This show is huge, a dramatic, global food event.”

In the fall of 2021, Robert and friend, Jon Taffer, from rival Paramount show, Bar Rescue, faced off for a best-of-three, limited, competition series entitled "Restaurant Rivals: Irvine vs Taffer". The popular series launched on the Discovery+ streaming platform in March 2022.

== Restaurants and other businesses ==
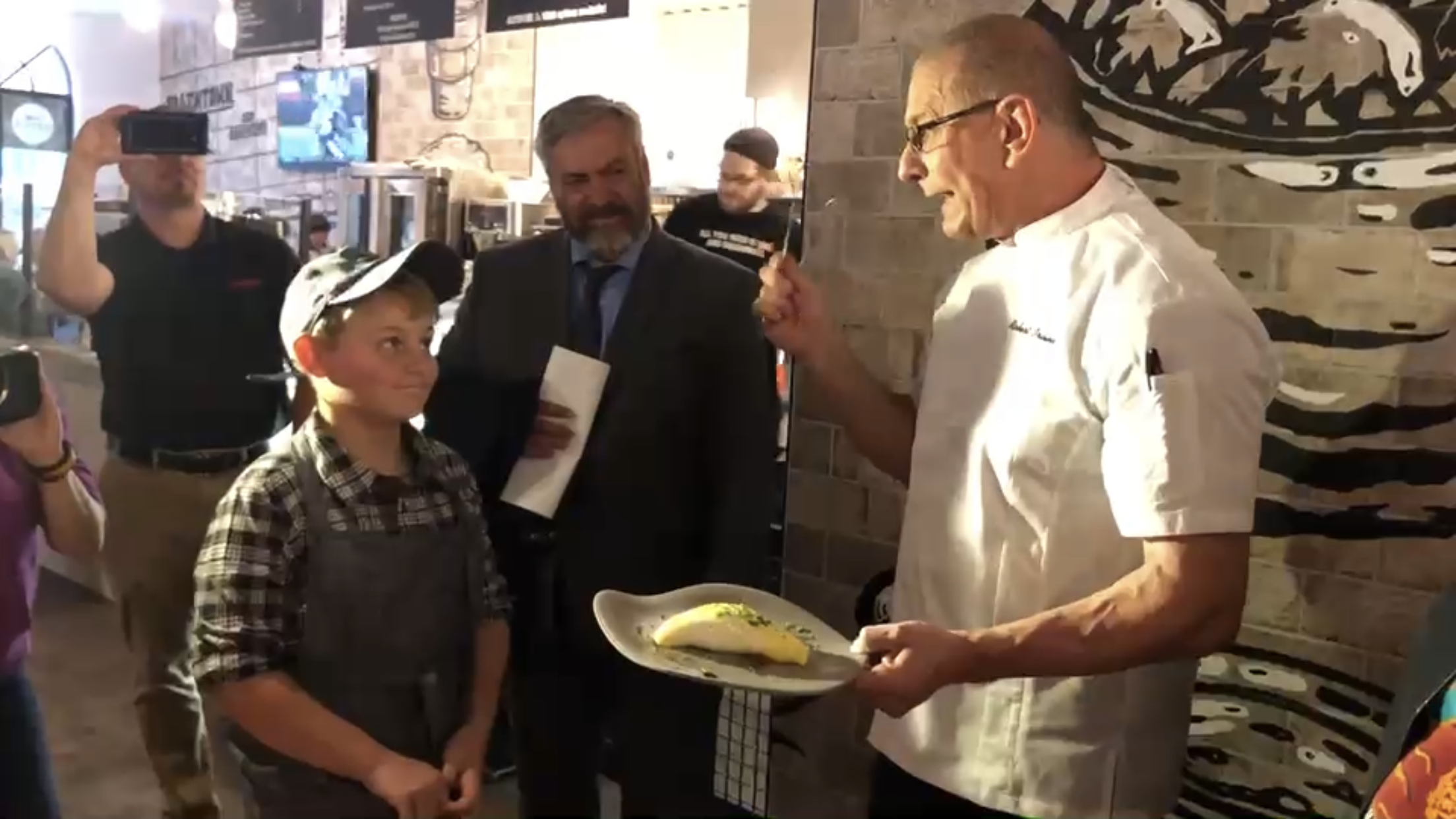
Irvine celebrating the opening of his restaurant "Fresh Kitchen" in Allentown by letting Julius DeMicco cook an omelet for him in his own kitchen

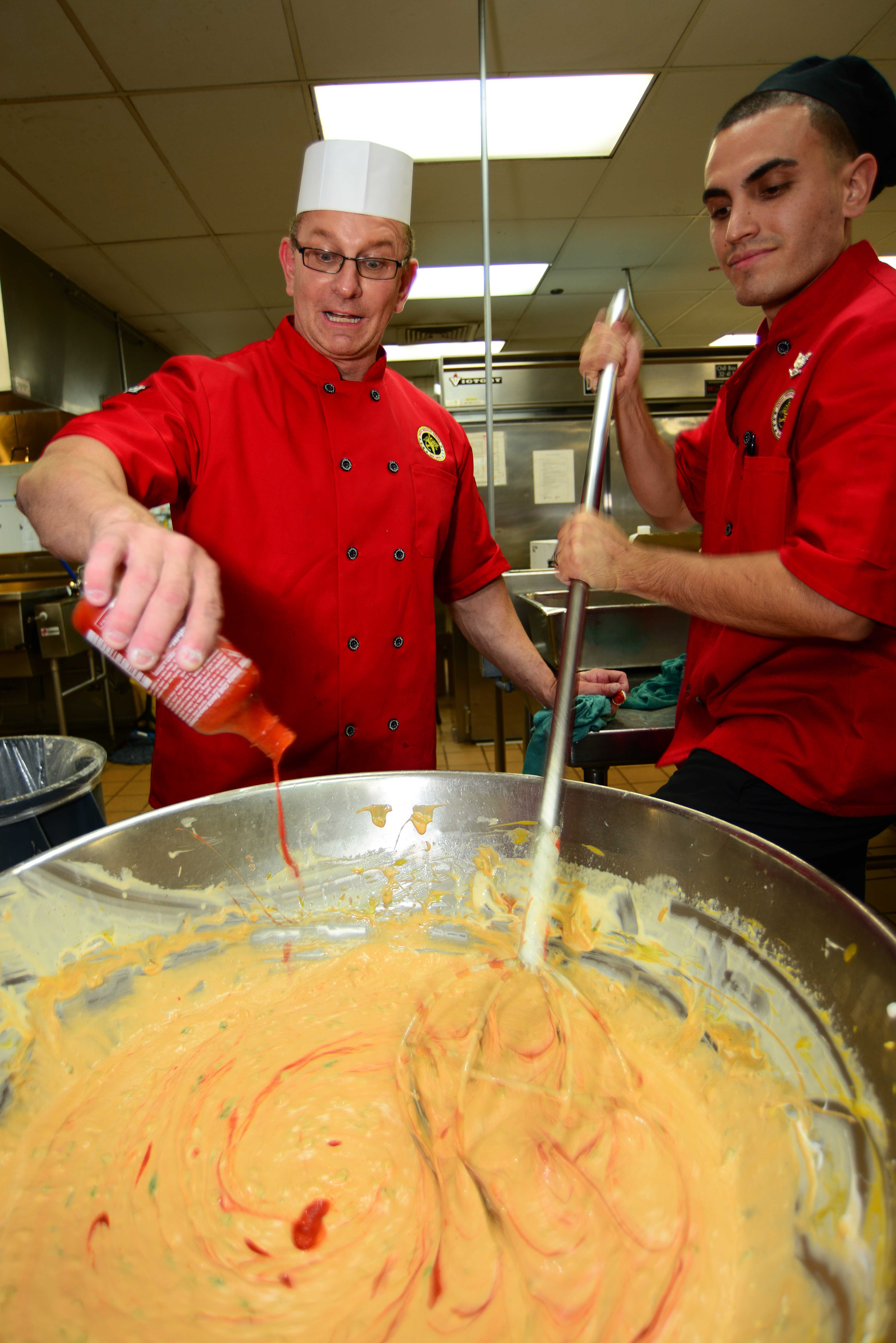
Irvine cooking with a US Navy chef in October 2012

Irvine is founder of Robert Irvine Foods and has introduced an Irvine-branded line of foods, spices, and oils. A portion of the proceeds from the sales are donated to his foundation, which supports the US military.

In May 2016, Irvine and the Tropicana Las Vegas resort jointly announced plans for a new restaurant. Robert Irvine's Public House opened in July 2017, and closed when the Tropicana closed in April 2024. Irvine also became co-owner of Boardroom Spirits, a distillery in Lansdale, Pennsylvania.

In September 2019, Irvine opened Fresh Kitchen by Robert Irvine in Allentown, Pennsylvania, in the newly opened Downtown Allentown Market. It was the second Fresh Kitchen location; the first is within the walls of The Pentagon in Washington, D.C., and opened in 2016. Following its closure during the COVID-19 pandemic, it was announced that the Allentown restaurant will not reopen.

During the pandemic, Irvine also partnered with the tech company WorkMerk to offer the VirusSAFE Pro, a mobile app to be used by restaurants as a checklist to validate their compliance with OSHA, CDC and NIH guidelines.

Between 2012 and 2016, Irvine launched a bevy of healthy food products, including Fit Crunch protein bars, as well as a "better for you" cheesecake and frozen crab cakes.

== Books and magazines ==
Irvine's first cookbook, Mission: Cook!, written with Brian O'Reilly, was published by HarperCollins Publishers in September 2007. His second cookbook, Impossible to Easy, was published in 2010. In April 2011, he began work as a regular columnist for Muscle & Fitness magazine, with the magazine featuring his recipes regularly through 2016. In 2015, he published Fit Fuel: A Chef's Guide to Eating Well, Getting Fit, and Living Your Best Life. In the book, he writes about his early life as a "scrawny" kid who read Muscle & Fitness and had aspirations to be like Arnold Schwarzenegger. He developed a passion for weight training and physical fitness at an early age, played rugby, and by the time he joined the UK's Royal Navy, was strong enough to be a wheelman in the Field Gun Competition, carrying a large cannon wheel for his team. Fit Fuel combines healthy recipes, Robert's own workouts and the tough love motivation that he became known for on Restaurant: Impossible.

In 2018, he published his fourth book, Family Table By Robert Irvine, which presented his favourite family-style recipes along with a collection of essays on how to connect with your family through activity.

In 2014, he appeared on the cover of Train magazine, shirtless. In May 2016, he launched Robert Irvine Magazine, a digital publication that works as a continuation of the concepts presented in Fit Fuel. A healthy lifestyle publication, the magazine features healthy recipes, workouts, gear recommendations, expert advice from doctors and trainers and life advice and success tips from celebrities and professional athletes.

== Charitable work ==
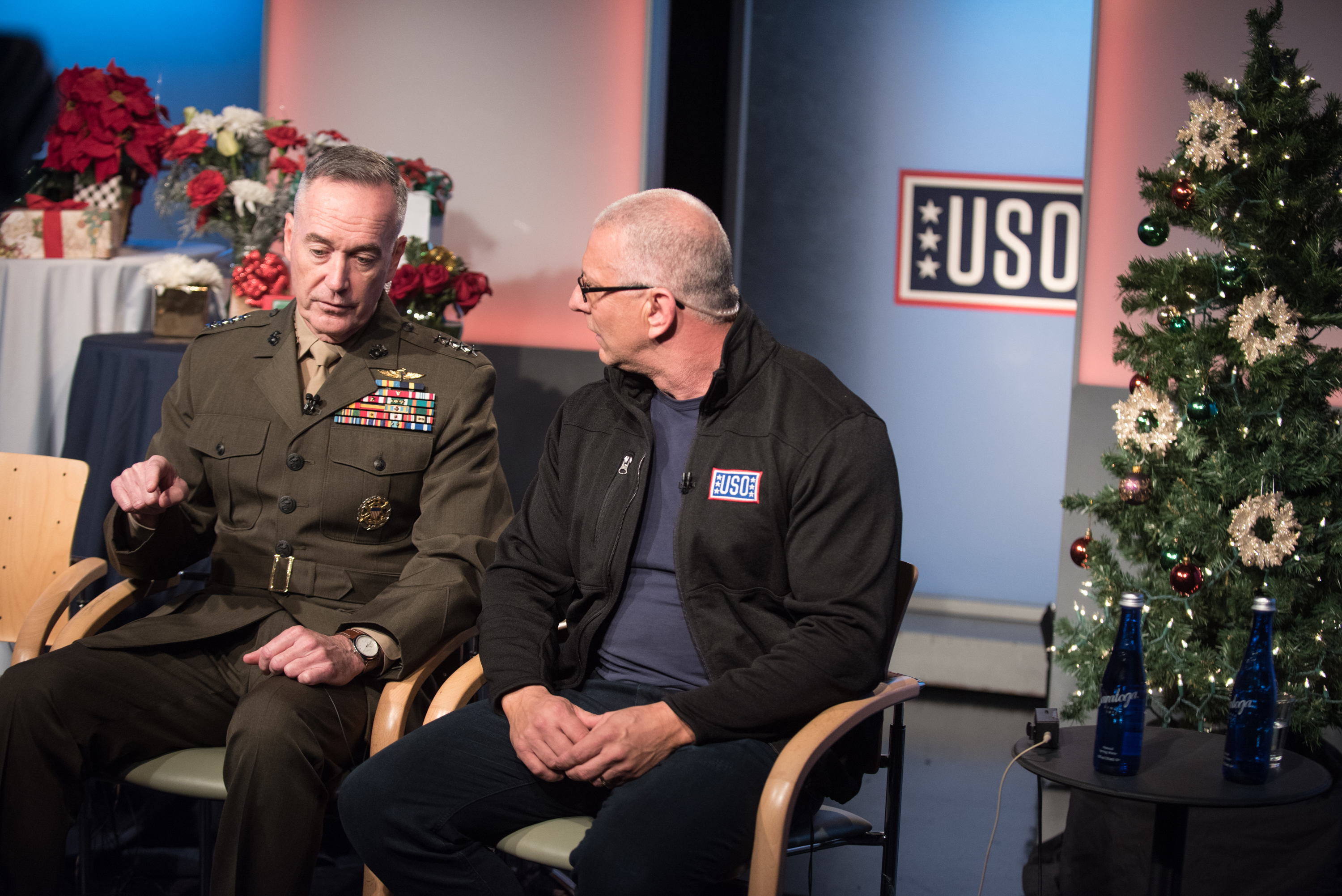
Irvine conversing with US Chairman of the Joint Chiefs of Staff, General Joseph Dunford in December 2016

Irvine has been involved with the Children Uniting Nations charity that was founded by southern California socialite Daphna Ziman. He was one of a team of celebrity chefs who participated in their fundraising dinner for the 77th Academy Awards in 2005 in addition to serving as Head Chef at their 78th Academy Awards dinner in 2006. Irvine is a member of the Council of Chefs, Cora's charity dedicated to helping hungry children.

Irvine toured Afghanistan in 2013 with the Honoring Our Troops Tour and hosted a Meals Ready to Eat (MRE) competition.

In 2014, Irvine founded The Robert Irvine Foundation to honour the men and women of the military. The foundation raises money and then allocates grants to active duty men and women and veterans in need. Irvine is also a regular contributor to the Gary Sinise Foundation and regularly appears at the organization's Invincible Spirit Festivals. For his work in honouring the men and women of the US military, Irvine was honoured with a Patriot Award from the Medal of Honor Society in September 2015, alongside ABC News' Bob Woodruff, Patriots owner Robert Kraft, and US Marine Corps Commandant Joseph F. Dunford Jr. In 2016, Irvine was awarded the third highest honour within the US Department of the Army Civilian Awards, the Outstanding Civilian Service Award, for substantial contributions to the US Army community through his work with the Robert Irvine Foundation.

Explaining his passion for giving back to those who serve in the military, Irvine told Muscle & Fitness, "When you strip it all away, this is what gets me out of bed in the morning—the opportunity to make a real difference in people's lives. And to positively affect the lives of those who defend our freedom is the cause that is closest to my heart. All the success I have I owe to the fact that I live in a free society in the greatest nation on Earth. That freedom is made possible by the selfless sacrifice of our men and women in uniform. No amount of money I donate or benefits that I attend can ever scratch the surface on the debt we owe to these men and women and their families, but it is imperative that we try. It all starts to fall apart if we fail to show our gratitude."

Irvine helped raise more than $118,000 to pay for the hospital expenses of an Escondido, California restaurant owner who was previously featured on an episode of Restaurant: Impossible.

== Honours and awards ==
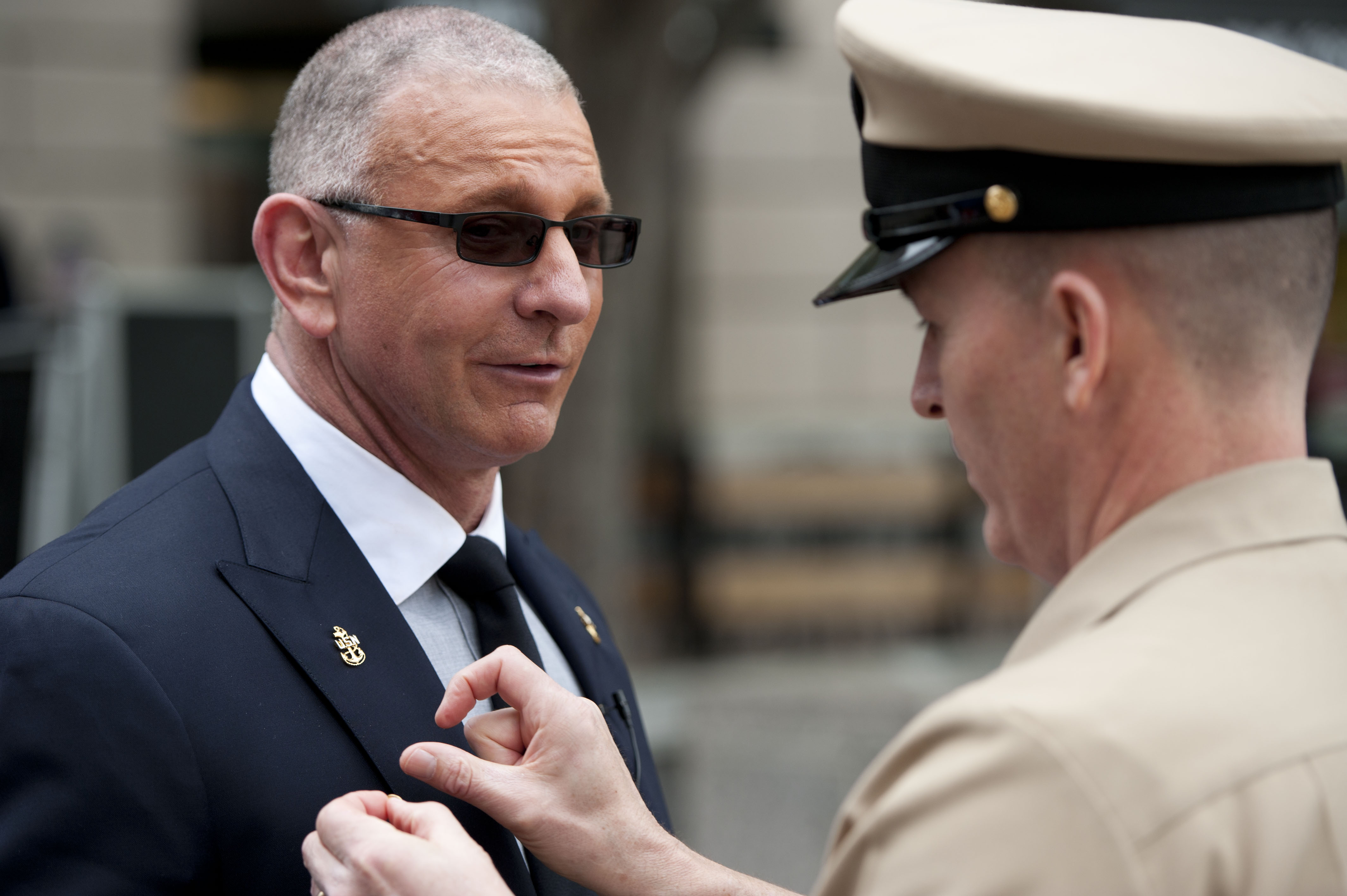
Irvine being made an honorary chief petty officer of the US Navy in May 2015 at Washington, D.C.

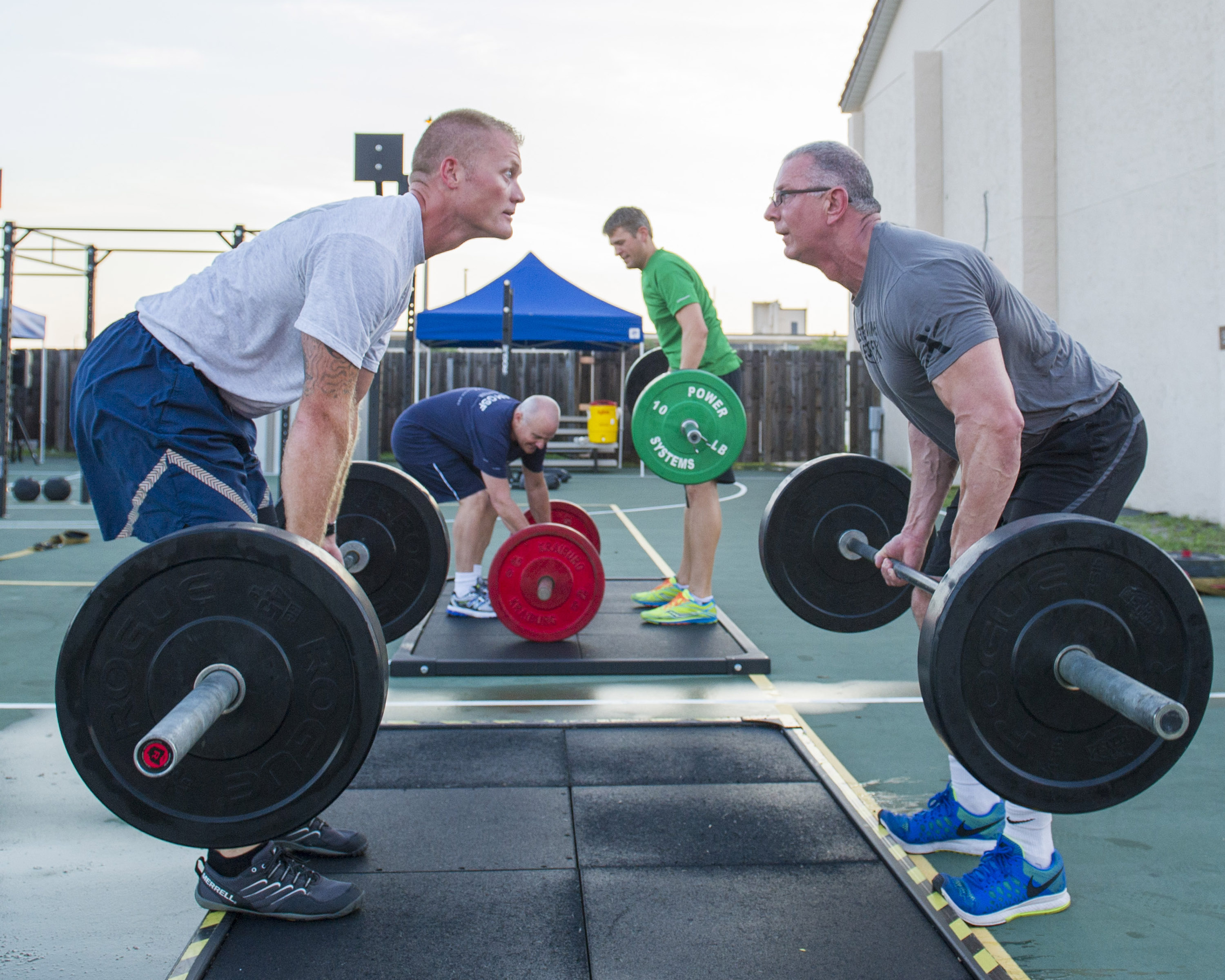
Irvine weightlifting at a US Air Force base in Florida in July 2015

- Ambassador of the Culinary Institute of America awarded in December 2007
- Chef Professional from La Toque Blanche International
- 2001 Culinary Excellence Award granted at Carnegie Hall by the Culinary Institute of America and the American Tasting Institute
- Trustee of the American Academy of Hospitality Sciences' Five-Star Diamond Award
- Member of the Malta Chefs Society (MCS)
- Episode of Restaurant: Impossible in the Culinary Hall of Fame
- United States Navy Honorary Chief Petty Officer
- Medal of Honor Society's Bob Hope Award for Excellence in Entertainment
- US Department of the Army Outstanding Civilian Service Award, Spring 2016
- Spirit of Hope Award, 2017
- ASYMCA Angel of Honor Award, 2018
- Association of the United States Army National Service Award, 2020
- Critic's Choice Association Real TV Awards Winner (Male Star of the Year), 2022
- Veterans of Foreign Wars Distinguished Citizenship Award (First to ever receive the honor), July 2023
- Special Operations Warrior Foundation “Legacy Of Service” Award, April 2024

== Personal life ==
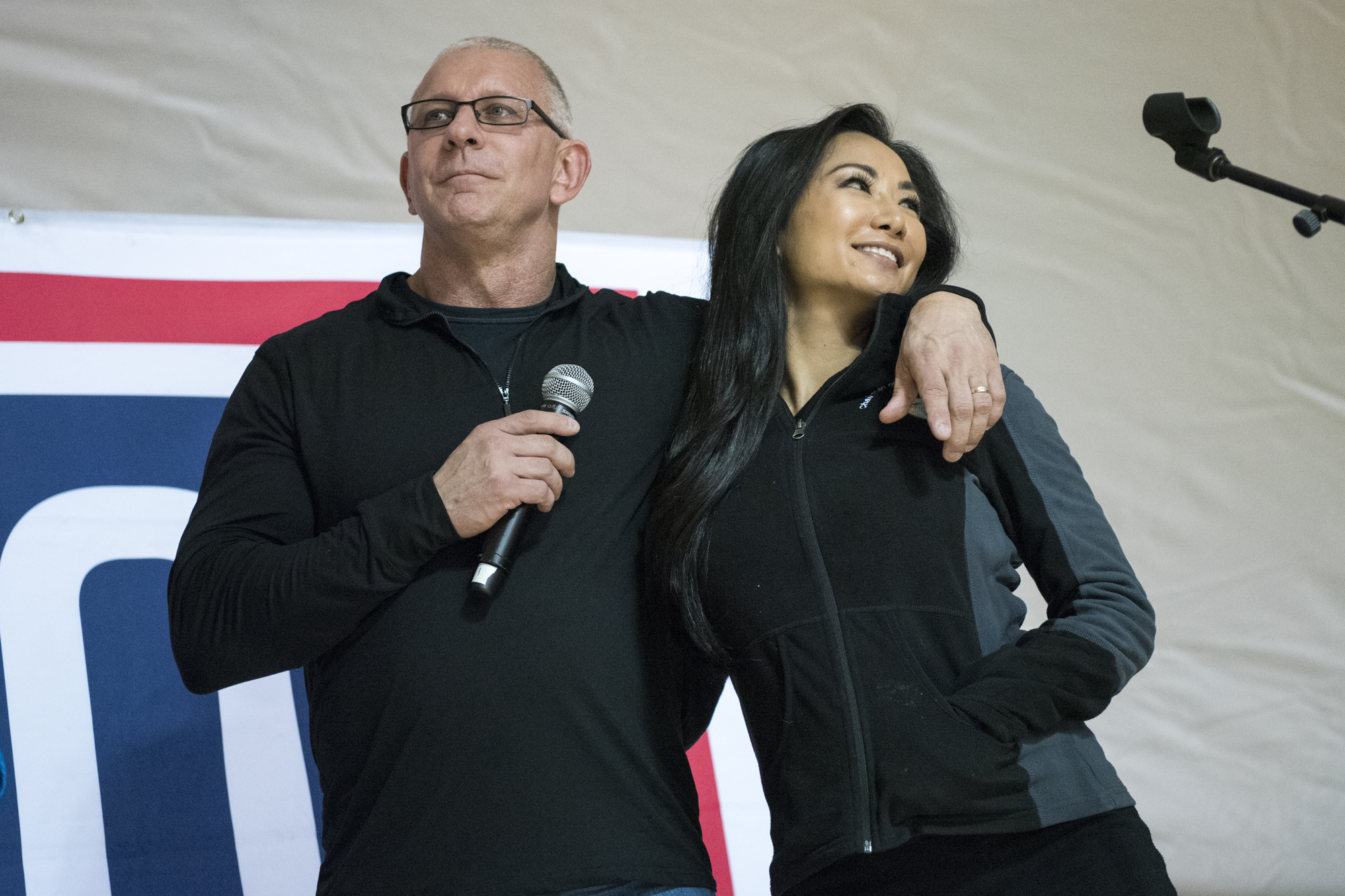
Irvine and wife Gail Kim in 2016

Irvine lived with his wife Karen in Absecon, New Jersey, before buying another home in Hilton Head Island, South Carolina, where he lived until at least 2002. Irvine married professional wrestler Gail Kim on 10 May 2012. The couple met on the set of Dinner: Impossible, when he came to serve VIPs for WWE's SummerSlam. As of December 2013, Irvine's permanent residence was listed as Tampa, Florida. He has two daughters from his previous marriage.

Due to his active lifestyle and passion for physical fitness, Irvine was selected as one of the "25 Fittest Guys in America" by Men's Fitness magazine in 2007. He typically works in a black T-shirt or chef's jacket bearing the Irvine clan badge with the motto: sub sole, sub umbra, virens ("flourishing in both sunshine and shade").
