= 2013–14 United States network television schedule (daytime) =

The 2013–14 daytime network television schedule for four of the five major English-language commercial broadcast networks in the United States covers the weekday daytime hours from September 2013 to August 2014. The schedule is followed by a list per network of returning series, and any series canceled after the 2012–13 season.

The CW replacing its' Vortexx block with One Magnificent Morning at the end of the season resulted in the five major commercial broadcast networks only running regular series for preschoolers and viewers aged 13 and up.

Affiliates fill time periods not occupied by network programs with local or syndicated programming. PBS – which offers daytime programming through a children's program block, PBS Kids – is not included, as its member television stations have local flexibility over most of their schedules and broadcast times for network shows may vary. Also not included are stations affiliated with Fox (as the network does not air a daytime network schedule or network news), The CW Plus and MyNetworkTV (as the programming services also do not offer daytime programs of any kind), and Ion Television (as its schedule is composed mainly of syndicated reruns).

== Legend ==
- Light yellow indicates talk shows.
- Green indicates soap operas.
- Pink indicates game shows.
- Gold indicates news programming.
- White indicates local programming.
- Light teal indicates sporting events.
- Light purple indicates children's programming.
- Light blue indicates other programs not applicable to the above categorizations.

== Schedule ==
- New series are highlighted in **bold**.
- All times correspond to U.S. Eastern and Pacific Time scheduling (except for some live sports or events). Except where affiliates slot certain programs outside their network-dictated timeslots, subtract one hour for Central, Mountain, Alaska, and Hawaii–Aleutian times.
- Local schedules may differ, as affiliates have the option to pre-empt or delay network programs. Such scheduling may be limited to preemptions caused by local or national breaking news or weather coverage (which may force stations to tape delay certain programs in overnight timeslots or defer them to a co-operated station or digital subchannel in their regular timeslot) and any major sports events scheduled to air in a weekday timeslot (mainly during major holidays). Stations may air shows at other times at their preference.

=== Monday-Friday ===
Network	7:00 am	7:30 am	8:00 am	8:30 am	9:00 am	9:30 am	10:00 am	10:30 am	11:00 am	11:30 am	noon	12:30 pm	1:00 pm	1:30 pm	2:00 pm	2:30 pm	3:00 pm	3:30 pm	4:00 pm	4:30 pm	5:00 pm	5:30 pm	6:00 pm	6:30 pm
ABC	Good Morning America				Local and/or syndicated programming				The View		Local and/or syndicated programming		The Chew		General Hospital		Local and/or syndicated programming							ABC World News with Diane Sawyer
CBS	CBS This Morning				Local and/or syndicated programming		Let's Make a Deal		The Price is Right		Local and/or syndicated programming	The Young and the Restless		The Bold and the Beautiful	The Talk		Local and/or syndicated programming							CBS Evening News with Scott Pelley
NBC	Today								Local and/or syndicated programming				Days of Our Lives		Local and/or syndicated programming									NBC Nightly News with Brian Williams
CW	Local and/or syndicated programming																		The Bill Cunningham Show		Local and/or syndicated programming			

=== Saturday ===
Network		7:00 am	7:30 am	8:00 am	8:30 am	9:00 am	9:30 am	10:00 am	10:30 am	11:00 am	11:30 am	noon	12:30 pm	1:00 pm	1:30 pm	2:00 pm	2:30 pm	3:00 pm	3:30 pm	4:00 pm	4:30 pm	5:00 pm	5:30 pm	6:00 pm	6:30 pm
ABC	Fall	Good Morning America		Local and/or syndicated programming				Jack Hanna's Wild Countdown	Ocean Mysteries with Jeff Corwin	Born to Explore with Richard Wiese	Sea Rescue	**The Wildlife Docs**	Expedition Wild	ESPN College Football on ABC											
ABC	Winter	Good Morning America		Local and/or syndicated programming				Jack Hanna's Wild Countdown	Ocean Mysteries with Jeff Corwin	Born to Explore with Richard Wiese	Sea Rescue	**The Wildlife Docs**	Expedition Wild	ESPN on ABC and/or local programming				ESPN on ABC programming						Local news	ABC World News Saturday
CBS	Fall	CBS This Morning Saturday				Local and/or syndicated programming		**Lucky Dog**	**Dr. Chris Pet Vet**	Recipe Rehab	**Jamie's 15-Minute Meals**	**All In with Laila Ali**	Game Changers with Kevin Frazier	SEC on CBS											
CBS	Winter	CBS This Morning Saturday				Local and/or syndicated programming		**Lucky Dog**	**Dr. Chris Pet Vet**	Recipe Rehab	**Jamie's 15-Minute Meals**	**All In with Laila Ali**	Game Changers with Kevin Frazier	CBS Sports and/or local programming				CBS Sports programming						Local news	CBS Evening News
NBC	Fall	Weekend Today				Local and/or syndicated programming		The Chica Show	Pajanimals	Justin Time	Tree Fu Tom	LazyTown	Make Way for Noddy	NBC Sports and/or local programming				NBC Sports programming						Local news	NBC Nightly News with Lester Holt
NBC	Winter	Weekend Today				Local and/or syndicated programming		The Chica Show	Noodle and Doodle	Justin Time	Tree Fu Tom	LazyTown	Make Way for Noddy	NBC Sports and/or local programming				NBC Sports programming						Local news	NBC Nightly News with Lester Holt
NBC	Spring	Weekend Today				Local and/or syndicated programming		The Chica Show	Noodle and Doodle	Justin Time	Tree Fu Tom	LazyTown	Zou	NBC Sports and/or local programming				NBC Sports programming						Local news	NBC Nightly News with Lester Holt
FOX		Local and/or syndicated programming						Weekend Marketplace				Fox Sports and/or local programming													
The CW	Fall	The Adventures of Chuck and Friends	Rescue Heroes (R)	Sonic X (R)	Bolts and Blip	The Spectacular Spider-Man (R)	Justice League Unlimited	Dragon Ball Z Kai (R)	B-Daman Crossfire	Yu-Gi-Oh! (R)	Yu-Gi-Oh! Zexal	Local and/or syndicated programming													
The CW	January	The Adventures of Chuck and Friends	Rescue Heroes (R)	Sonic X (R)	Bolts and Blip	The Spectacular Spider-Man (R)	Justice League Unlimited	Dragon Ball Z Kai (R)	**Digimon Fusion**	Yu-Gi-Oh! (R)	Yu-Gi-Oh! Zexal	Local and/or syndicated programming													
The CW	February	Rescue Heroes (R)		Sonic X (R)	Bolts and Blip	The Spectacular Spider-Man (R)	Justice League Unlimited	Dragon Ball Z Kai (R)	**Digimon Fusion**	Yu-Gi-Oh! (R)	Yu-Gi-Oh! Zexal	Local and/or syndicated programming													
The CW	August	Cubix: Robots for Everyone (R)		Sonic X (R)	Bolts and Blip	The Spectacular Spider-Man (R)		Dragon Ball Z Kai (R)	**Digimon Fusion**	Yu-Gi-Oh! (R)	Yu-Gi-Oh! Zexal	Local and/or syndicated programming													

=== Sunday ===
Network		7:00 am	7:30 am	8:00 am	8:30 am	9:00 am	9:30 am	10:00 am	10:30 am	11:00 am	11:30 am	noon	12:30 pm	1:00 pm	1:30 pm	2:00 pm	2:30 pm	3:00 pm	3:30 pm	4:00 pm	4:30 pm	5:00 pm	5:30 pm	6:00 pm	6:30 pm
ABC		Local and/or syndicated programming		Good Morning America		Local and/or syndicated programming		This Week with George Stephanopoluos		ESPN on ABC and/or local programming														Local news	ABC World News Sunday
CBS	Fall	Local and/or syndicated programming				CBS News Sunday Morning			Face the Nation		Local and/or syndicated programming	NFL Today		NFL on CBS											
CBS	Mid-winter	Local and/or syndicated programming				CBS News Sunday Morning			Face the Nation		Local and/or syndicated programming	CBS Sports and/or local programming												Local news	CBS Evening News
NBC		Local and/or syndicated programming		Weekend Today		Meet the Press		Local and/or syndicated programming				NBC Sports and/or local programming												Local news	NBC Nightly News with Lester Holt
FOX	Fall	Local and/or syndicated programming				Fox News Sunday		Local and/or syndicated programming				Fox NFL Sunday		Fox NFL (and sometimes local programming)											
FOX	Mid-winter	Local and/or syndicated programming				Fox News Sunday		Local and/or syndicated programming				Fox Sports and/or local programming												Local and/or syndicated programming	

== By network ==
=== ABC ===
Returning series:

- ABC World News
- The Chew
- General Hospital
- Good Morning America
- The View
- This Week with George Stephanopoluos
- Litton's Weekend Adventure
  - Jack Hanna's Wild Countdown
  - Ocean Mysteries with Jeff Corwin
  - Born to Explore with Richard Wiese
  - Sea Rescue

New series:

- Litton's Weekend Adventure
  - The Wildlife Docs
  - Expedition Wild

Not returning from 2012-13

- Litton's Weekend Adventure
  - Recipe Rehab (moved to CBS)
  - Food for Thought with Claire Thomas

=== CBS ===
Returning series:

- The Bold and the Beautiful
- CBS Evening News
- CBS News Sunday Morning
- CBS This Morning
- Face the Nation
- Let's Make a Deal
- The Price is Right
- The Talk
- The Young and the Restless

New series:

- CBS Dream Team
  - Lucky Dog
  - Dr. Chris Pet Vet
  - Recipe Rehab (moved from ABC)
  - Jamie's 15-Minute Meals
  - All In with Laila Ali
  - Game Changers with Kevin Frazier

Not returning from 2012-13

- Cookie Jar TV
  - Busytown Mysteries
  - The Doodlebops
  - Liberty’s Kids

=== The CW ===
Returning series:

- The Bill Cunningham Show
- The Adventures of Chuck and Friends
- Rescue Heroes
- Sonic X
- Bolts & Blip
- The Spectacular Spider-Man
- Justice League Unlimited
- Dragon Ball Z Kai
- B-Daman Crossfire
- Yu-Gi-Oh!
- Yu-Gi-Oh! Zexal
- Cubix: Robots for Everyone

New series:

- Digimon Fusion

Not returning from 2012-13

- Power Rangers Lost Galaxy
- Iron Man: Armored Adventures
- WWE Saturday Morning Slam
- Transformers Prime (continues on The Hub)
- The New Adventures of Nanoboy

=== FOX ===
Returning series:

- Fox News Sunday
- Fox Sports
  - Fox NFL
  - Fox NFL Sunday
- Weekend Marketplace

Not returning from 2012-13:

- MLB Player Poll

=== NBC ===
Returning series:

- Days of Our Lives
- Meet the Press
- NBC Nightly News
- Today with Matt Lauer and Savannah Guthrie
- NBC Kids
  - The Chica Show
  - Pajanimals
  - Justin Time
  - Tree Fu Tom
  - LazyTown
  - Noodle and Doodle

New series:

- NBC Kids
  - Make Way for Noddy
  - Zou

Not returning from 2012-13

- NBC Kids
  - Poppy Cat
  - The Wiggles (continues on Sprout)

== See also ==
- 2013–14 United States network television schedule (prime-time)
- 2013–14 United States network television schedule (late night)

== Sources ==
- Curt Alliaume. "ABC Daytime Schedule". Curt Alliaume’s Utterly Irrelevant Web Site. Archived from the original on October 15, 2007.
- Curt Alliaume. "CBS Daytime Schedule". Curt Alliaume’s Utterly Irrelevant Web Site. Archived from the original on October 15, 2007.
- Curt Alliaume. "NBC Daytime Schedule". Curt Alliaume’s Utterly Irrelevant Web Site. Archived from the original on October 12, 2007.
