= 2014–15 United States network television schedule (daytime) =

The 2014–15 daytime network television schedule for four of the five major English-language commercial broadcast networks in the United States covers the weekday daytime hours from September 2014 to August 2015. The schedule is followed by a list per network of returning series, and any series canceled after the 2013–14 season.

Affiliates fill time periods not occupied by network programs with local or syndicated programming. PBS – which offers daytime programming through a children's program block, PBS Kids – is not included, as its member television stations have local flexibility over most of their schedules and broadcast times for network shows may vary. Also not included are stations affiliated with Fox (as the network does not air a daytime network schedule or network news), The CW Plus and MyNetworkTV (as the programming services also do not offer daytime programs of any kind), and Ion Television (as its schedule is composed mainly of syndicated reruns).

== Legend ==
- Light yellow indicates talk shows.
- Green indicates soap operas.
- Pink indicates game shows.
- Gold indicates news programming.
- White indicates local programming.
- Light teal indicates sporting events.
- Light purple indicates children's programming.
- Light blue indicates other programs not applicable to the above categorizations.
- New series are highlighted in **bold**.

== Schedule ==
- All times correspond to U.S. Eastern and Pacific Time scheduling (except for some live sports or events). Except where affiliates slot certain programs outside their network-dictated timeslots, subtract one hour for Central, Mountain, Alaska, and Hawaii–Aleutian times.
- Local schedules may differ, as affiliates have the option to pre-empt or delay network programs. Such scheduling may be limited to preemptions caused by local or national breaking news or weather coverage (which may force stations to tape delay certain programs in overnight timeslots or defer them to a co-operated station or digital subchannel in their regular timeslot) and any major sports events scheduled to air in a weekday timeslot (mainly during major holidays). Stations may air shows at other times at their preference.

=== Monday-Friday ===
Network		7:00 am	7:30 am	8:00 am	8:30 am	9:00 am	9:30 am	10:00 am	10:30 am	11:00 am	11:30 am	noon	12:30 pm	1:00 pm	1:30 pm	2:00 pm	2:30 pm	3:00 pm	3:30 pm	4:00 pm	4:30 pm	5:00 pm	5:30 pm	6:00 pm	6:30 pm
ABC		Good Morning America				Local and/or syndicated programming				The View		Local and/or syndicated programming		The Chew		General Hospital		Local and/or syndicated programming							ABC World News Tonight with David Muir
CBS		CBS This Morning				Local and/or syndicated programming		Let's Make a Deal		The Price is Right		Local and/or syndicated programming	The Young and the Restless		The Bold and the Beautiful	The Talk		Local and/or syndicated programming							CBS Evening News with Scott Pelley
NBC	Fall	Today								Local and/or syndicated programming				Days of Our Lives		Local and/or syndicated programming									NBC Nightly News with Brian Williams
NBC	Winter	Today								Local and/or syndicated programming				Days of Our Lives		Local and/or syndicated programming									NBC Nightly News with Lester Holt
CW		Local and/or syndicated programming																		The Bill Cunningham Show		Local and/or syndicated programming			

=== Saturday ===
Network		7:00 am	7:30 am	8:00 am	8:30 am	9:00 am	9:30 am	10:00 am	10:30 am	11:00 am	11:30 am	noon	12:30 pm	1:00 pm	1:30 pm	2:00 pm	2:30 pm	3:00 pm	3:30 pm	4:00 pm	4:30 pm	5:00 pm	5:30 pm	6:00 pm	6:30 pm
ABC	Fall	Good Morning America		Local and/or syndicated programming				Jack Hanna's Wild Countdown	Ocean Mysteries with Jeff Corwin	Sea Rescue	The Wildlife Docs	**Outback Adventures with Tim Faulkner**	Born to Explore with Richard Wiese	ESPN College Football on ABC											
ABC	Winter	Good Morning America		Local and/or syndicated programming				Jack Hanna's Wild Countdown	Ocean Mysteries with Jeff Corwin	Sea Rescue	The Wildlife Docs	**Outback Adventures with Tim Faulkner**	Born to Explore with Richard Wiese	ESPN on ABC and/or local programming				ESPN on ABC programming						Local news	ABC World News Saturday
CBS	Fall	CBS This Morning Saturday				Local and/or syndicated programming		Lucky Dog	Dr. Chris Pet Vet	**The Henry Ford's Innovation Nation with Mo Rocca**	Recipe Rehab	All In with Laila Ali	Game Changers with Kevin Frazier	SEC on CBS											
CBS	Winter	CBS This Morning Saturday				Local and/or syndicated programming		Lucky Dog	Dr. Chris Pet Vet	**The Henry Ford's Innovation Nation with Mo Rocca**	Recipe Rehab	All In with Laila Ali	Game Changers with Kevin Frazier	CBS Sports and/or local programming				CBS Sports programming						Local news	CBS Evening News
NBC	Fall	Weekend Today				Local and/or syndicated programming		**Astroblast!**	The Chica Show	Tree Fu Tom	LazyTown	Poppy Cat	Noodle and Doodle	NBC Sports and/or local programming				NBC Sports programming						Local news	NBC Nightly News with Lester Holt
NBC	Winter	Weekend Today				Local and/or syndicated programming		**Astroblast!**	The Chica Show	Tree Fu Tom	LazyTown	Poppy Cat	Noodle and Doodle	NBC Sports and/or local programming				NBC Sports programming						Local news	NBC Nightly News
NBC	April	Weekend Today				Local and/or syndicated programming		**Astroblast!**	The Chica Show	**Earth to Luna!**	LazyTown	Poppy Cat	Noodle and Doodle	NBC Sports and/or local programming				NBC Sports programming						Local news	NBC Nightly News
NBC	July	Weekend Today				Local and/or syndicated programming		**Ruff-Ruff, Tweet and Dave**	Astroblast!	**Earth to Luna!**	LazyTown	Poppy Cat	Tree Fu Tom	NBC Sports and/or local programming				NBC Sports programming						Local news	NBC Nightly News
FOX		Local and/or syndicated programming						**Xploration Awesome Planet**	**Xploration Outer Space**	**Xploration Earth 2050**	**Xploration Animal Science**	Fox Sports and/or local programming													
The CW	Fall	**Dog Whisperer with Cesar Milan: Family Edition**		**Calling Dr. Pol**		**The Brady Barr Experience**		Expedition Wild		**Rock the Park**	**Reluctantly Healthy**	Local and/or syndicated programming													
The CW	Winter	Calling Dr. Pol			Dog Whisperer with Cesar Milan: Family Edition				Expedition Wild		Rock the Park	Local and/or syndicated programming													
The CW	July	Calling Dr. Pol			Dog Whisperer with Cesar Milan: Family Edition				**Dog Town, USA**	Expedition Wild	Rock the Park	Local and/or syndicated programming													

=== Sunday ===
Network		7:00 am	7:30 am	8:00 am	8:30 am	9:00 am	9:30 am	10:00 am	10:30 am	11:00 am	11:30 am	noon	12:30 pm	1:00 pm	1:30 pm	2:00 pm	2:30 pm	3:00 pm	3:30 pm	4:00 pm	4:30 pm	5:00 pm	5:30 pm	6:00 pm	6:30 pm
ABC		Local and/or syndicated programming		Good Morning America		Local and/or syndicated programming		This Week with George Stephanopoluos		ESPN on ABC and/or local programming														Local news	ABC World News Sunday
CBS	Fall	Local and/or syndicated programming				CBS News Sunday Morning			Face the Nation		Local and/or syndicated programming	NFL Today		NFL on CBS											
CBS	Mid-winter	Local and/or syndicated programming				CBS News Sunday Morning			Face the Nation		Local and/or syndicated programming	CBS Sports and/or local programming												Local news	CBS Evening News
NBC	Fall	Local and/or syndicated programming		Weekend Today		Meet the Press		Local and/or syndicated programming				NBC Sports and/or local programming												Local news	NBC Nightly News with Lester Holt
NBC	Winter	Local and/or syndicated programming		Weekend Today		Meet the Press		Local and/or syndicated programming				NBC Sports and/or local programming												Local news	NBC Nightly News
FOX	Fall	Local and/or syndicated programming				Fox News Sunday		Local and/or syndicated programming				Fox NFL Sunday		Fox NFL (and sometimes local programming)											
FOX	Mid-winter	Local and/or syndicated programming				Fox News Sunday		Local and/or syndicated programming				Fox Sports and/or local programming												Local and/or syndicated programming	

== By network ==
=== ABC ===
Returning series:

- ABC World News Tonight
- The Chew
- General Hospital
- Good Morning America
- The View
- This Week with George Stephanopoluos
- Litton's Weekend Adventure
  - Jack Hanna's Wild Countdown
  - Ocean Mysteries with Jeff Corwin
  - Sea Rescue
  - The Wildlife Docs
  - Born to Explore with Richard Wiese

New series:

- Litton's Weekend Adventure
  - **Outback Adventures with Tim Faulkner**

**Not returning from 2013-14**

- Litton's Weekend Adventure
  - Expedition Wild (Moved to The CW)

=== CBS ===
Returning series:

- The Bold and the Beautiful
- CBS Evening News
- CBS News Sunday Morning
- CBS This Morning
- Face the Nation
- Let's Make a Deal
- The Price is Right
- The Talk
- The Young and the Restless
- CBS Dream Team
  - Lucky Dog
  - Dr. Chris Pet Vet
  - Recipe Rehab
  - All In with Laila Ali
  - Game Changers with Kevin Frazier

New series:

- CBS Dream Team
  - **The Henry Ford's Innovation Nation with Mo Rocca**

**Not returning from 2013-14**

- CBS Dream Team
  - Jamie's 15-Minute Meals

=== FOX ===
**Returning series**

- Weekend Marketplace

New series:

- **Xploration Station**
  - **Xploration Awesome Planet**
  - **Xploration Outer Space**
  - **Xploration Earth 2050**
  - **Xploration Animal Science**

=== The CW ===
Returning series:

- The Bill Cunningham Show

New series:

- **One Magnificent Morning**
  - **Dog Whisperer with Cesar Milan: Family Edition**
  - **Calling Dr. Pol**
  - **The Brady Barr Experience**
  - **Expedition Wild** (Moved from ABC)
  - **Rock the Park**
  - **Reluctantly Healthy**
  - **Dog Town, USA**

**Not returning from 2013-14**

- Vortexx
  - The Adventures of Chuck and Friends (continued on Discovery Family)
  - Rescue Heroes
  - Sonic X
  - Bolts & Blip
  - The Spectacular Spider-Man
  - Justice League Unlimited
  - Dragon Ball Z Kai
  - B-Daman Crossfire
  - Yu-Gi-Oh!
  - Yu-Gi-Oh! Zexal (continued on Nicktoons and Hulu)
  - Digimon Fusion (continued on Nicktoons)
  - Cubix: Robots for Everyone

=== NBC ===
Returning series:

- Days of Our Lives
- Meet the Press
- NBC Nightly News
- Today
- NBC Kids
  - The Chica Show
  - Tree Fu Tom
  - LazyTown
  - Poppy Cat
  - Noodle and Doodle

New series:

- NBC Kids
  - **Astroblast!**
  - **Earth to Luna!**
  - **Ruff-Ruff, Tweet and Dave**

**Not returning from 2013-14**

- NBC Kids
  - Pajanimals (continues on Sprout)
  - Justin Time (continues on Sprout)
  - Make Way for Noddy (continues on Sprout)
  - Zou (continues on Sprout)

== See also ==
- 2014–15 United States network television schedule (prime-time)
- 2014–15 United States network television schedule (late night)

== Sources ==
- Curt Alliaume. "ABC Daytime Schedule". Curt Alliaume’s Utterly Irrelevant Web Site. Archived from the original on October 15, 2007.
- Curt Alliaume. "CBS Daytime Schedule". Curt Alliaume’s Utterly Irrelevant Web Site. Archived from the original on October 15, 2007.
- Curt Alliaume. "NBC Daytime Schedule". Curt Alliaume’s Utterly Irrelevant Web Site. Archived from the original on October 12, 2007.
