= 2012–13 United States network television schedule (daytime) =

The 2012–13 daytime network television schedule for four of the five major English-language commercial broadcast networks in the United States covers the weekday daytime hours from September 2012 to August 2013. The schedule is followed by a list per network of returning series, and any series canceled after the 2011–12 season.

Affiliates fill time periods not occupied by network programs with local or syndicated programming. PBS – which offers daytime programming through a children's program block, PBS Kids – is not included, as its member television stations have local flexibility over most of their schedules and broadcast times for network shows may vary. Also not included are stations affiliated with Fox (as the network does not air a daytime network schedule or network news), The CW Plus and MyNetworkTV (as the programming services also do not offer daytime programs of any kind), and Ion Television (as its schedule is composed mainly of syndicated reruns).

== Legend ==
- Light yellow indicates talk shows.
- Green indicates soap operas.
- Pink indicates game shows.
- Gold indicates news programming.
- White indicates local programming.
- Light teal indicates sporting events.
- Light purple indicates children's programming.
- Light blue indicates other programs not applicable to the above categorizations.
- New series are highlighted in **bold**.

== Schedule ==
- All times correspond to U.S. Eastern and Pacific Time scheduling (except for some live sports or events). Except where affiliates slot certain programs outside their network-dictated timeslots, subtract one hour for Central, Mountain, Alaska, and Hawaii–Aleutian times.
- Local schedules may differ, as affiliates have the option to pre-empt or delay network programs. Such scheduling may be limited to preemptions caused by local or national breaking news or weather coverage (which may force stations to tape delay certain programs in overnight timeslots or defer them to a co-operated station or digital subchannel in their regular timeslot) and any major sports events scheduled to air in a weekday timeslot (mainly during major holidays). Stations may air shows at other times at their preference.

=== Monday-Friday ===
Network	7:00 am	7:30 am	8:00 am	8:30 am	9:00 am	9:30 am	10:00 am	10:30 am	11:00 am	11:30 am	noon	12:30 pm	1:00 pm	1:30 pm	2:00 pm	2:30 pm	3:00 pm	3:30 pm	4:00 pm	4:30 pm	5:00 pm	5:30 pm	6:00 pm	6:30 pm
ABC	Good Morning America				Local and/or syndicated programming				The View		Local and/or syndicated programming		The Chew		General Hospital		Local and/or syndicated programming							ABC World News with Diane Sawyer
CBS	CBS This Morning				Local and/or syndicated programming		Let's Make a Deal		The Price Is Right		Local and/or syndicated programming	The Young and the Restless		The Bold and the Beautiful	The Talk		Local and/or syndicated programming							CBS Evening News with Scott Pelley
NBC	Today								Local and/or syndicated programming				Days of Our Lives		Local and/or syndicated programming									NBC Nightly News with Brian Williams
CW	Local and/or syndicated programming																**The Bill Cunningham Show**		Local and/or syndicated programming					

- Note: On September 10, 2012, ABC moved General Hospital to 2:00 p.m. ET (a move done partly to accommodate the addition of the syndicated talk show Katie), and turned over the 3:00 p.m. ET hour to its owned-and-operated stations and affiliates.

=== Saturday ===
Network		7:00 am	7:30 am	8:00 am	8:30 am	9:00 am	9:30 am	10:00 am	10:30 am	11:00 am	11:30 am	noon	12:30 pm	1:00 pm	1:30 pm	2:00 pm	2:30 pm	3:00 pm	3:30 pm	4:00 pm	4:30 pm	5:00 pm	5:30 pm	6:00 pm	6:30 pm
ABC	Fall	Good Morning America		Local and/or syndicated programming				Jack Hanna's Wild Countdown	Ocean Mysteries with Jeff Corwin	Born to Explore with Richard Wiese	Sea Rescue	**Recipe Rehab**	Food for Thought with Claire Thomas	ESPN College Football on ABC											
ABC	Winter	Good Morning America		Local and/or syndicated programming				Jack Hanna's Wild Countdown	Ocean Mysteries with Jeff Corwin	Born to Explore with Richard Wiese	Sea Rescue	**Recipe Rehab**	Food for Thought with Claire Thomas	ESPN on ABC and/or local programming				ESPN on ABC programming						Local news	ABC World News Saturday
CBS	Fall	CBS This Morning Saturday				**Liberty's Kids**		The Doodlebops		Busytown Mysteries		SEC on CBS													
CBS	Winter	CBS This Morning Saturday				**Liberty's Kids**		The Doodlebops		Busytown Mysteries		CBS Sports and/or local programming						CBS Sports programming						Local news	CBS Evening News
NBC	Fall	Weekend Today				Local and/or syndicated programming		Noodle and Doodle	Pajanimals	Poppy Cat	Justin Time	LazyTown	The Wiggles	NBC Sports and/or local programming				NBC Sports programming						Local news	NBC Nightly News with Lester Holt
NBC	February	Weekend Today				Local and/or syndicated programming		**The Chica Show**	Pajanimals	Poppy Cat	Justin Time	LazyTown	Noodle and Doodle	NBC Sports and/or local programming				NBC Sports programming						Local news	NBC Nightly News with Lester Holt
NBC	Summer	Weekend Today				Local and/or syndicated programming		**The Chica Show**	Pajanimals	Justin Time	**Tree Fu Tom**	LazyTown	Noodle and Doodle	NBC Sports and/or local programming				NBC Sports programming						Local news	NBC Nightly News with Lester Holt
FOX	Fall	Local and/or syndicated programming						Weekend Marketplace				Fox Sports and/or local programming													
FOX	April	Local and/or syndicated programming						Weekend Marketplace				MLB Player Poll	Fox Sports and/or local programming												
The CW	Fall	Cubix: Robots for Everyone (R)	Rescue Heroes (R)	Power Rangers Lost Galaxy (R)	Yu-Gi-Oh! Zexal	**Iron Man: Armored Adventures**	**Justice League Unlimited**	**WWE Saturday Morning Slam**	Dragon Ball Z Kai	Yu-Gi-Oh! (R)	Yu-Gi-Oh! Zexal	Local and/or syndicated programming													
The CW	Mid-September	Rescue Heroes (R)		Power Rangers Lost Galaxy (R)	Yu-Gi-Oh! Zexal	**Iron Man: Armored Adventures**	**Justice League Unlimited**	**WWE Saturday Morning Slam**	Dragon Ball Z Kai	Yu-Gi-Oh! (R)	Yu-Gi-Oh! Zexal	Local and/or syndicated programming													
The CW	October	Rescue Heroes (R)		Sonic X (R)	Power Rangers Lost Galaxy (R)	**Iron Man: Armored Adventures**	**Justice League Unlimited**	**WWE Saturday Morning Slam**	Dragon Ball Z Kai	Yu-Gi-Oh! (R)	Yu-Gi-Oh! Zexal	Local and/or syndicated programming													
The CW	December	Rescue Heroes (R)		Sonic X (R)	Power Rangers Lost Galaxy (R)	**Transformers: Prime**	**Justice League Unlimited**	**WWE Saturday Morning Slam**	Dragon Ball Z Kai	Yu-Gi-Oh! Zexal	Yu-Gi-Oh! (R)	Local and/or syndicated programming													
The CW	Early January	Rescue Heroes (R)		Sonic X (R)	Power Rangers Lost Galaxy (R)	**Transformers: Prime**	**Justice League Unlimited**	**WWE Saturday Morning Slam**	Dragon Ball Z Kai	Yu-Gi-Oh! Zexal		Local and/or syndicated programming													
The CW	Mid-January	Rescue Heroes (R)		Sonic X (R)		**Transformers: Prime**	**Justice League Unlimited**	Dragon Ball Z Kai	WWE Saturday Morning Slam	Yu-Gi-Oh! (R)	Yu-Gi-Oh! Zexal	Local and/or syndicated programming													
The CW	March	**The New Adventures of Nanoboy**		Sonic X (R)		**Transformers: Prime**	**Justice League Unlimited**	Dragon Ball Z Kai	WWE Saturday Morning Slam	Yu-Gi-Oh! (R)	Yu-Gi-Oh! Zexal	Local and/or syndicated programming													
The CW	April	Rescue Heroes (R)	The New Adventures of Nanoboy	Sonic X (R)		**Transformers: Prime**	**Justice League Unlimited**	Dragon Ball Z Kai	WWE Saturday Morning Slam	Yu-Gi-Oh! (R)	Yu-Gi-Oh! Zexal	Local and/or syndicated programming													
The CW	May	Rescue Heroes (R)	The New Adventures of Nanoboy	Sonic X (R)		**Transformers: Prime**	**Justice League Unlimited**	Dragon Ball Z Kai		Yu-Gi-Oh! (R)	Yu-Gi-Oh! Zexal	Local and/or syndicated programming													
The CW	June	Rescue Heroes (R)	The New Adventures of Nanoboy	Sonic X (R)		Justice League Unlimited		Dragon Ball Z Kai		Yu-Gi-Oh! (R)	Yu-Gi-Oh! Zexal	Local and/or syndicated programming													
The CW	July	Rescue Heroes (R)	The New Adventures of Nanoboy	Sonic X (R)	**Bolts and Blip**	Justice League Unlimited		Dragon Ball Z Kai		Yu-Gi-Oh! (R)	Yu-Gi-Oh! Zexal	Local and/or syndicated programming													
The CW	August	**The Adventures of Chuck and Friends**	Rescue Heroes (R)	Sonic X (R)	**Bolts and Blip**	The Spectacular Spider-Man (R)	Justice League Unlimited	Dragon Ball Z Kai	**B-Daman Crossfire**	Yu-Gi-Oh! (R)	Yu-Gi-Oh! Zexal	Local and/or syndicated programming													

=== Sunday ===
Network		7:00 am	7:30 am	8:00 am	8:30 am	9:00 am	9:30 am	10:00 am	10:30 am	11:00 am	11:30 am	noon	12:30 pm	1:00 pm	1:30 pm	2:00 pm	2:30 pm	3:00 pm	3:30 pm	4:00 pm	4:30 pm	5:00 pm	5:30 pm	6:00 pm	6:30 pm
ABC		Local and/or syndicated programming		Good Morning America		Local and/or syndicated programming		This Week with George Stephanopoluos		ESPN on ABC and/or local programming														Local news	ABC World News Sunday
CBS	Fall	Local and/or syndicated programming				CBS News Sunday Morning			Face the Nation		Local and/or syndicated programming	NFL Today		NFL on CBS											
CBS	Mid-winter	Local and/or syndicated programming				CBS News Sunday Morning			Face the Nation		Local and/or syndicated programming	CBS Sports and/or local programming												Local news	CBS Evening News
NBC		Local and/or syndicated programming		Weekend Today		Meet the Press		Local and/or syndicated programming				NBC Sports and/or local programming												Local news	NBC Nightly News with Lester Holt
FOX	Fall	Local and/or syndicated programming				Fox News Sunday		Local and/or syndicated programming				Fox NFL Sunday		Fox NFL (and sometimes local programming)											
FOX	Mid-winter	Local and/or syndicated programming				Fox News Sunday		Local and/or syndicated programming				Fox Sports and/or local programming												Local and/or syndicated programming	

== By network ==
=== ABC ===
Returning series:

- ABC World News with Diane Sawyer
- The Chew
- General Hospital
- Good Morning America
- The View
- This Week with George Stephanopoluos
- Litton's Weekend Adventure
  - Jack Hanna's Wild Countdown
  - Ocean Mysteries with Jeff Corwin
  - Born to Explore with Richard Wiese
  - Sea Rescue
  - Food for Thought with Claire Thomas

New series:

- Litton's Weekend Adventure
  - **Recipe Rehab**

Not returning from 2011–12:

- Good Afternoon America
- One Life to Live
- The Revolution
- Litton's Weekend Adventure
  - Culture Click
  - Everyday Health

=== CBS ===
Returning series:

- The Bold and the Beautiful
- CBS Evening News
- CBS News Sunday Morning
- CBS This Morning
- Face the Nation
- Let's Make a Deal
- The Price Is Right
- The Talk
- The Young and the Restless
- Cookie Jar TV
  - Busytown Mysteries
  - The Doodlebops

New series:

- Cookie Jar TV
  - **Liberty's Kids**

**Not returning from 2011-12**

- The Early Show
- Cookie Jar TV
  - Danger Rangers
  - Horseland

=== The CW ===
New series:

- **The Bill Cunningham Show** (moved from first-run syndication)
- **Vortexx**
  - **Power Rangers Lost Galaxy**
  - **Iron Man: Armored Adventures**
  - **Justice League Unlimited**
  - **WWE Saturday Morning Slam**
  - **Transformers: Prime**
  - **The New Adventures of Nanoboy**
  - **The Adventures of Chuck and Friends**
  - **B-Daman Crossfire**
  - **Bolts & Blip**
  - **The Spectacular Spider-Man**

Returning series:

- Yu-Gi-Oh!
- Yu-Gi-Oh! Zexal
- Rescue Heroes
- Dragon Ball Z Kai
- Cubix: Robots for Everyone
- Sonic X

Not returning from 2011–12:

- Dr. Drew's Lifechangers
- Toonzai
  - Tai Chi Chasers
  - Magi-Nation
  - Yu-Gi-Oh! Capsule Monsters

=== FOX ===
Returning series:
- Fox News Sunday
- Fox Sports
  - Fox NFL
  - Fox NFL Sunday
  - MLB Player Poll
- Weekend Marketplace

=== NBC ===
Returning series:

- Days of Our Lives
- Meet the Press
- NBC Nightly News with Brian Williams
- Today with Matt Lauer and Savannah Guthrie
- NBC Kids
  - Noodle and Doodle
  - Pajanimals
  - Poppy Cat
  - Justin Time
  - LazyTown
  - The Wiggles

New series:

- NBC Kids
  - **The Chica Show**
  - **Tree Fu Tom**

Not returning from 2011-12:

- Qubo (continues on Ion Television)
  - Turbo Dogs
  - Shelldon
  - The Magic School Bus (reruns)
  - Babar (reruns)
  - Willa's Wild Life
  - Pearlie
  - The Zula Patrol
  - Jane and the Dragon (reruns)

== See also ==
- 2012–13 United States network television schedule (prime-time)
- 2012–13 United States network television schedule (late night)

== Sources ==
- Curt Alliaume. "ABC Daytime Schedule". Curt Alliaume’s Utterly Irrelevant Web Site. Archived from the original on October 15, 2007.
- Curt Alliaume. "CBS Daytime Schedule". Curt Alliaume’s Utterly Irrelevant Web Site. Archived from the original on October 15, 2007.
- Curt Alliaume. "NBC Daytime Schedule". Curt Alliaume’s Utterly Irrelevant Web Site. Archived from the original on October 12, 2007.
