= 2015–16 United States network television schedule (late night) =

These are the late night schedules for the four United States broadcast networks that offer programming during this time period, from September 2015 to August 2016. All times are Eastern or Pacific. Affiliates will fill non-network schedule with local, syndicated, or paid programming. Affiliates also have the option to preempt or delay network programming at their discretion.

== Legend ==
- Light blue indicates Local programming.
- Gray indicates encore programming.
- Yellow indicates late night talk or variety shows.
- Gold indicates network news programming.

== Schedule ==
=== Monday-Friday ===
Network	11:00 pm	11:30 pm	12:00 am	12:30 am	1:00 am	1:30 am	2:00 am	2:30 am	3:00 am	3:30 am	4:00 am	4:30 am	5:00 am	5:30 am
ABC	Local Programming	Jimmy Kimmel Live! (11:35)		Nightline (12:35)	Local Programming		ABC World News Now				America This Morning	Local Programming		
CBS	Local Programming	The Late Show with Stephen Colbert (11:35)		The Late Late Show with James Corden (12:35)		Local Programming	CBS Overnight News				CBS Morning News	Local Programming		
NBC	Local Programming	The Tonight Show Starring Jimmy Fallon (11:34)		Late Night with Seth Meyers		Last Call with Carson Daly	Today With Kathie Lee and Hoda (R)		Mad Money (R)		Early Today	Local Programming		

=== Saturday ===
Network		11:00 pm	11:30 pm	12:00 am	12:30 am	1:00 am	1:30 am	2:00 am	2:30 am	3:00 am	3:30 am	4:00 am	4:30 am	5:00 am	5:30 am
NBC		Local programming	Saturday Night Live (11:29)			Local programming (1:02)									
FOX	Fall	Encore Programming		Local Programming											
FOX	Winter	Party Over Here	Cooper Barrett's Guide to Surviving Life (R)	Local Programming											
FOX	Summer	Home Free (R)		Local Programming											

== By network ==
=== ABC ===
Returning series

- ABC World News Now
- Jimmy Kimmel Live!
- Nightline

=== CBS ===
Returning series

- The Late Late Show with James Corden

New series

- CBS Overnight News
- The Late Show with Stephen Colbert

Not returning from 2014-15:

- CBS Summer Showcase
- Late Show with David Letterman
- The Late Late Show with Craig Ferguson
- Up to the Minute

=== FOX ===
Returning series

- Encore Programming
- Home Free (reruns)
- Sunday Sitcom Series

New series

- Party Over Here

=== NBC ===
Returning series

- Last Call with Carson Daly
- Late Night with Seth Meyers
- Mad Money (reruns)
- Saturday Night Live
- Today With Kathie Lee and Hoda (reruns)
- The Tonight Show Starring Jimmy Fallon
