= Cubix - Robots for Everyone: Race 'N Robots =

2001 video game

Cubix: Robots for Everyone - Race 'n Robots
- PlayStation Cover Art
- Developer: Blitz Games
- Publisher: The 3DO Company
- Platforms: Game Boy Color, PlayStation
- Release: Game Boy Color: NA: November 13, 2001; PlayStation: NA: November 6, 2001; EU: 2002
- Genre: Racing
- Modes: Single-player, multiplayer

Cubix: Robots for Everyone: Race 'n Robots is a 2001 racing game developed by Blitz Games and published by The 3DO Company, based on the Cubix: Robots for Everyone television series.

== Gameplay ==
A screenshot of Race 'n Robots, depicting gameplay from the PlayStation version.

Race 'n Robots is a racing game in which the players race robots against competitors on a series of tracks that feature power-ups and obstacles. Similarly to the show of the same name, the story of Race 'n Robots sees the player race the robot Cubix and his friends against the antagonist Dr. K and his robot Kolossal, who are bent on taking over the world.

Minor differences in gameplay exist between versions of Race 'n Robots. The PlayStation version of the game contains a Story Mode that guides players through a series of increasingly difficult tracks, in which players can unlock new tracks and use points earned from winning a race to purchase upgrades for their robot. The game also contains a Versus Mode for instant play for one to four players. The Game Boy Color version of the game contains similar features at a smaller scale, with a password feature to save games after completing a level and unlockable secret tracks.

== Development ==
In 2001, The 3DO Company agreed with 4Kids Entertainment to license video games for all platforms based on the show Cubix: Robots for Everyone. Race 'n Robots was announced by The 3DO Company in August 2001 for a Christmas season release, and shipped to retail stores in North America on November 6, 2001.

In December 2001, 3DO Europe secured the rights to release the games globally aside from Asia and the Middle East, announcing that Race 'N Robots would be released in early 2002. However, due to poor reception, the game's release was delayed indefinitely, in part following negative reception upon preview from reviewers, including PlayStation Official Magazine UK in April 2002. The game would eventually see a release later on in the year.

== Reception ==
Reception

Review scores
| Publication | Score | |
| Publication | GBC | PS |
|---|---|---|
| AllGame | 3/5 | 2.5/5 |
| PlayStation Official Magazine – UK | | 1/10 |
| Game Boy Xtreme | 65% | |
| St. Louis Post-Dispatch | | 1/4 |

Race 'n Robots received mixed to negative reviews. Reviewing the PlayStation version, Mike Jenkins of PlayStation Official Magazine UK warned players to not buy the game, dismissing it as "the worst racer ever to mar (the) PlayStation", singling out the "useless viewing perspective" due to "not being able to see the road ahead" when leading a race, "dire controls", "pointless upgrades" and "gameplay without a hint of fun". In a more forgiving review for the Game Boy Color, Simon Brew of Game Boy Xtreme praised the game's courses as "well designed and challenging", although criticized not "having enough time to react to what's just around the corner" due to the small screen size of the Game Boy Color, stating that "each of the varied tracks ultimately becomes more of a memory test than a driving challenge".
