= 2014–15 United States network television schedule (late night) =

These are the late night schedules for the four United States broadcast networks that offer programming during this time period, from September 2014 to August 2015. All times are Eastern or Pacific. Affiliates will fill non-network schedule with local, syndicated, or paid programming. Affiliates also have the option to preempt or delay network programming at their discretion.

== Legend ==
- Light blue indicates Local programming.
- Gray indicates encore programming.
- Yellow indicates late night talk or variety shows.
- Gold indicates network news programming.

== Schedule ==
=== Monday-Friday ===
Network		11:00 pm	11:30 pm	12:00 am	12:30 am	1:00 am	1:30 am	2:00 am	2:30 am	3:00 am	3:30 am	4:00 am	4:30 am	5:00 am	5:30 am
ABC		Local Programming	Jimmy Kimmel Live! (11:35)		Nightline (12:35)	Local Programming		ABC World News Now				America This Morning	Local Programming		
CBS	Fall	Local Programming	Late Show with David Letterman (11:35)		The Late Late Show with Craig Ferguson (12:35)		Local Programming	Up To The Minute				CBS Morning News	Local Programming		
CBS	Winter	Local Programming	Late Show with David Letterman (11:35)		The Late Late Show (12:35)		Local Programming	Up To The Minute				CBS Morning News	Local Programming		
CBS	Spring	Local Programming	Late Show with David Letterman (11:35)		The Late Late Show with James Corden (12:35)		Local Programming	Up To The Minute				CBS Morning News	Local Programming		
CBS	Summer	Local Programming	CBS Summer Showcase (11:35)		The Late Late Show with James Corden (12:35)		Local Programming	Up To The Minute				CBS Morning News	Local Programming		
NBC		Local Programming	The Tonight Show Starring Jimmy Fallon (11:34)		Late Night with Seth Meyers		Last Call with Carson Daly	Today With Kathie Lee and Hoda (R)		Mad Money (R)		Early Today	Local Programming		

=== Notes ===
- The final episode of The Late Late Show with Craig Ferguson aired on December 19, 2014. From January 5, 2015 to March 6, 2015, guest hosts filled the void until The Late Late Show with James Corden premiered on March 23, 2015.
- The Summer 2014 weekday schedule continued into the Fall 2014 scheduled unchanged.
- On CBS, special late-night editions of The Talk aired January 12–16, 2015 in the timeslot of The Late Late Show.
- Following the series finale of Late Show with David Letterman, its timeslot was filled with varying reruns of CBS drama programs under the umbrella title CBS Summer Showcase until the premiere of The Late Show with Stephen Colbert in September 2015. The Mentalist was the first to be aired in this slot.

=== Saturday ===
Network	11:00 pm	11:30 pm	12:00 am	12:30 am	1:00 am	1:30 am	2:00 am	2:30 am	3:00 am	3:30 am	4:00 am	4:30 am	5:00 am	5:30 am
NBC	Local programming	Saturday Night Live (11:29)			Local programming (1:02)									
FOX	Encore Programming		Local programming											

== By network ==
=== ABC ===
Returning series

- ABC World News Now
- Jimmy Kimmel Live!
- Nightline

=== CBS ===
Returning series

- Late Night with David Letterman
- The Late Late Show with Craig Ferguson
- Up to the Minute

New series

- CBS Summer Showcase
- The Late Late Show with James Corden

=== FOX ===
Returning series:

- Encore Programming

Not returning from 2013-14:

- Animation Domination High-Def

=== NBC ===
Returning series

- Last Call with Carson Daly
- Late Night with Seth Meyers
- Mad Money (reruns)
- Saturday Night Live
- Today With Kathie Lee and Hoda (reruns)
- The Tonight Show Starring Jimmy Fallon

Not returning from 2013-14:

- Late Night with Jimmy Fallon
- The Tonight Show with Jay Leno
