= Toonzai =

American Saturday morning cartoon block (2008-2012)

- Network: The CW
- Launched: May 24, 2008; 18 years ago
- Closed: August 18, 2012; 14 years ago
- Country of origin: United States
- Owner: 4Kids Entertainment
- Headquarters: New York, New York, U.S.
- Formerly known as: The CW4Kids (2008–10)
- Format: Saturday morning cartoon block
- Running time: 5 hours (7:00 a.m. to noon)
- Original language: English

Toonzai (formerly known as the CW4Kids from May 24, 2008 to August 7, 2010) was an American Saturday morning cartoon children's television block that aired on the CW from May 24, 2008 to August 18, 2012. The block was created as a result of a four-year agreement between 4Kids Entertainment and the CW. The original name for the block from May 24, 2008 to August 7, 2010, the CW4Kids, was retained as a sub-brand through the end of the block's run in order to fulfill branding obligations per 4Kids Entertainment's contract to lease the CW's Saturday morning time slots. The name is a portmanteau of "toon" and the Japanese term banzai, reflecting the majority of anime programming on the block.

The block was replaced by Saban Brands' program block Vortexx, which debuted on August 25, 2012. On April 11, 2013, the Toonzai website redirected to the Vortexx website. Vortexx closed on September 27, 2014, and was replaced by Litton's One Magnificent Morning.

== History ==
=== Origin and launch ===
The CW4Kids logo used exclusively from May 24, 2008 to August 7, 2010.

On October 2, 2007, the CW announced due to a joint decision between the network's parent companies Time Warner and CBS Corporation that it would cancel the Kids' WB programming block, due to the effects of children's advertising limits and competition from cable television, and sell the programming time to 4Kids Entertainment. Kids' WB was discontinued on the CW on May 17, 2008 (Kids' WB, like The WB Television Network that the block originated, then relaunched as an online-only video on demand service). 4Kids Entertainment took over programming the block on May 24, 2008, premiering under the name the CW4Kids. In addition to programming the block, 4Kids also handled responsibilities for its content and advertising revenue."4Kids TV - Toonzai on The CW4Kids- Games, TV Shows, Fun and Much More". At the time of the block's launch, 4Kids also programmed the competing 4Kids TV block for Fox, until that network canceled its time leasing agreement with 4Kids TV on November 10, 2008, due to a dispute between Fox and 4Kids involving 4Kids' failure to pay the network for its time lease, and the network's inability to maintain guaranteed clearances for the block, due to difficulties getting Fox affiliates and stations that would be used as default carriers of the block in markets where the Fox station did not carry 4Kids TV to air it; 4Kids TV would air for the final time on Fox on December 27, 2008.

On April 27, 2010, 4Kids announced that it would rebrand the CW4Kids as Toonzai, which took effect on September 18, 2010.

=== Takeover by Saban Brands and closure ===
On June 26, 2012, Kidsco Media Ventures, an affiliate of Saban Capital Group, finalized a bid to acquire 4Kids' agreement with the CW for the block. On July 2, 2012, it was announced that Saban Brands, through Kidsco Media Ventures, would begin programming the block, which would be relaunched under the name Vortexx. Toonzai quietly shut down on the CW on August 18, 2012, after a Yu-Gi-Oh! marathon, with Vortexx premiering the following week on August 25, 2012. Some of Toonzai's programming, including Yu-Gi-Oh!, Yu-Gi-Oh! Zexal, Sonic X, and Dragon Ball Z Kai continued to air on the block until September 27, 2014, when Vortexx closed.

== Programming ==
It was the final children's block on the CW to be broadcast only in standard definition.

=== Programming differences ===
In most markets, CW affiliates used the network's recommended Saturday morning scheduling for the block, though some such as CW owned-and-operated station WUPA in Atlanta aired it on Sunday, instead due to regular Saturday programming. Connecticut affiliate WCCT-TV aired three hours on Saturday, and two hours on Sunday. KMAX-TV in Sacramento, California aired the entire lineup, but it had a four-hour tape delay, running from 11:00 a.m. to 4:00 p.m. WLFL in Raleigh, North Carolina and WNUV in Baltimore, aired the entire lineup, but it had two hours earlier, running from 5:00 a.m. to 10:00 a.m. San Diego's XETV-TV, aired three hours from 5:00 a.m. to 8:00 a.m. and two hours from 10:00 a.m. to noon. San Antonio's KMYS, which affiliated with the CW in 2010, aired it on Sunday and Monday before 5:00 a.m. Other stations preempted portions of the block, while Shreveport, Louisiana's KPXJ-TV preempted the final hour of the block. Columbus, Georgia's WLTZ-DT2 preempted the first half-hour of the block.

While the CW recommended that its affiliates carry the CW4Kids/Toonzai block at 7:00 a.m. to noon Saturday mornings (regardless of time zone), its secondary CW Plus national feed for smaller markets aired the Toonzai block an hour earlier on its broadcast and cable-only affiliates in the Central, Mountain and Alaska time zones, as the CW Plus operates two separate feeds running on Eastern and Pacific time zone schedules. The only exception was in Boise, Idaho, where they had two CW networks (both the CW and the CW Plus), the CW Plus affiliate (now a MeTV affiliate) KNIN-DT2 carried the block (also aired an hour earlier), but the main CW affiliate (now a Fox affiliate) KNIN-TV declined to carry the block or the block's predecessor Kids' WB upon becoming a charter CW affiliate after the affiliation switch from UPN in September 2006, as the station did not clear for daytime CW programming including weekends, KNIN-TV instead carried syndicated E/I programming in the station's Saturday morning timeslot, making Boise one of the only television markets where Kids' WB or the CW4Kids not available on a CW affiliate via analog before the analog signal shutdown on June 12, 2009.

=== Former programming ===
==== The CW4Kids ====
===== Programming from 4Kids TV =====
Title	Premiere date	End date
Chaotic	June 21, 2008	July 10, 2010
Teenage Mutant Ninja Turtles	June 21, 2008	August 28, 2010
Yu-Gi-Oh! GX	June 21, 2008	September 6, 2008
Viva Piñata	September 13, 2008	October 18, 2008
Dinosaur King ‡	September 13, 2008	September 11, 2010
Yu-Gi-Oh! 5D's ‡	September 13, 2008	September 11, 2010
GoGoRiki^{E/I}	September 27, 2008	November 14, 2009
Sonic X ‡	January 3, 2009	September 11, 2010
Kirby: Right Back at Ya!	June 6, 2009	September 12, 2009
Winx Club^{E/I}	July 18, 2009	July 17, 2010
Yu-Gi-Oh! † ‡	September 5, 2009	September 11, 2010
Magical DoReMi^{E/I}	April 24, 2010	July 17, 2010
Cubix: Robots for Everyone^{E/I} † ‡	July 24, 2010	September 11, 2010

===== Acquired programming =====
Title	Premiere date	End date
Will and Dewitt^{E/I} †	May 24, 2008	April 4, 2009
Magi-Nation^{E/I} † ‡	May 24, 2008	September 20, 2008
Skunk Fu! †	May 24, 2008	October 18, 2008
Skunk Fu! †	May 29, 2010	July 10, 2010
Tom and Jerry Tales †	May 24, 2008	September 6, 2008
The Spectacular Spider-Man †	May 24, 2008	January 31, 2009
World of Quest †	May 24, 2008	June 14, 2008
Johnny Test †	May 24, 2008	June 14, 2008
Eon Kid †	May 24, 2008	June 14, 2008
The Batman †	June 21, 2008	August 2, 2008
Kamen Rider: Dragon Knight (Note: CW4Kids/Toonzai is named in the credits but did not directly produce the show.)	December 13, 2008	December 26, 2009
Huntik: Secrets & Seekers	January 3, 2009	December 26, 2009
RollBots	September 19, 2009	January 23, 2010
Dragon Ball Z Kai ‡	August 14, 2010	September 11, 2010

† - Program transitioned from Kids' WB!
‡ - Program transitioned to Toonzai

==== Toonzai ====
===== Programming from 4Kids TV =====
Title	Premiere date	End date
Cubix: Robots for Everyone^{E/I} † ‡	September 18, 2010	February 12, 2011
Cubix: Robots for Everyone^{E/I} † ‡	February 18, 2012	August 18, 2012
Sonic X † ‡	September 18, 2010	August 4, 2012
Yu-Gi-Oh! † ‡	September 18, 2010	August 18, 2012
Yu-Gi-Oh! 5D's †	September 18, 2010	September 10, 2011
Dinosaur King †	September 18, 2010	October 9, 2010
Tai Chi Chasers	September 17, 2011	June 2, 2012
Yu-Gi-Oh! Zexal ‡	October 15, 2011	August 18, 2012
Yu-Gi-Oh! Capsule Monsters	March 24, 2012	April 28, 2012

===== Acquired programming =====
Title	Premiere date	End date
Dragon Ball Z Kai † ‡	September 18, 2010	August 11, 2012
Magi-Nation^{E/I} †	February 19, 2011	February 11, 2012

† - Program transitioned from the CW4Kids
‡ - Program transitioned to Vortexx

=== Short-form programming ===
- Pat & Stan
- Magical DoReMi Witchling Sing-Along
- TMNT: Mayhem from Mutant Island
- GoGoWiki (GoGoRiki)
- GoTunes (GoGoRiki)
- The CW4Kids Vault (Viva Piñata, Skunk Fu!)

=== Programming blocks ===
- Popcorn for Breakfast – consisted of movies distributed by 4Kids Entertainment, like Kirby: Fright to the Finish!! and Turtles Forever.
- Dinosaurs and Dueling (8am–10am) – consisting of two new episodes of Dinosaur King and two episodes of the original Yu-Gi-Oh!.
- Full Hours (8am–Noon) – consisting of one full hour of Dinosaur King, one full hour of Teenage Mutant Ninja Turtles, one full hour Sonic X, and one full hour of Yu-Gi-Oh!.
- Saturday Morning Superstars (9am–Noon) – consisting of two episodes of Teenage Mutant Ninja Turtles, two episodes of Sonic X, and two episodes of Yu-Gi-Oh! (part of Full Hours).
- The Fast and The Fierce (10am-11am) – consisting of two episodes of Sonic X (part of Full Hours). Title is a parody of The Fast and the Furious.
- Double Vision Saturday (10am–Noon) – consisting of two episodes of Sonic X and two episodes of Yu-Gi-Oh! (part of Full Hours).

=== Special programming ===
- Kirby: Fright to the Finish!! (September 12, 2009)
- Turtles Forever (November 21, 2009, March 20, 2010, May 29, 2010, and August 28, 2010)

== See also ==
- 4Kids TV - predecessor of TheCW4Kids/Toonzai block ran on Fox from September 14, 2002 to December 27, 2008. Formerly FoxBox from September 14, 2002 to January 15, 2005.
- 4Kids Entertainment - entertainment company that programmed both blocks and the former FoxBox/4Kids TV.
- Fox Kids - predecessor of Foxbox/4Kids TV and TheCW4Kids/Toonzai.
- Kids' WB - predecessor of TheCW4Kids/Toonzai that ran on the CW from September 23, 2006 to May 17, 2008. Formerly on The WB from September 9, 1995 to September 16, 2006.
- Vortexx - successor of TheCW4Kids/Toonzai.
