= 2013–14 United States network television schedule (late night) =

These are the late night schedules for the four United States broadcast networks that offer programming during this time period, from September 2013 to August 2014. All times are Eastern or Pacific. Affiliates will fill non-network schedule with local, syndicated, or paid programming. Affiliates also have the option to preempt or delay network programming at their discretion.

== Legend ==
- Light blue indicates Local programming.
- Gray indicates encore programming.
- Yellow indicates late night talk or variety shows.
- Gold indicates network news programming.

== Schedule ==
=== Monday-Friday ===
Network		11:00 pm	11:30 pm	12:00 am	12:30 am	1:00 am	1:30 am	2:00 am	2:30 am	3:00 am	3:30 am	4:00 am	4:30 am	5:00 am	5:30 am
ABC		Local Programming	Jimmy Kimmel Live! (11:35)		Nightline (12:35)	Local Programming			ABC World News Now			America This Morning	Local Programming		
CBS		Local Programming	Late Show with David Letterman (11:35)		The Late Late Show with Craig Ferguson (12:35)		Local Programming			Up to the Minute		CBS Morning News	Local Programming		
NBC	Fall	Local Programming	The Tonight Show with Jay Leno (11:35)		Late Night with Jimmy Fallon (12:35)		Last Call with Carson Daly	Today with Kathie Lee and Hoda (R)		Mad Money (R)		Early Today	Local Programming		
NBC	Winter	Local Programming	The Tonight Show Starring Jimmy Fallon (11:34)		Late Night with Seth Meyers		Last Call with Carson Daly	Today with Kathie Lee and Hoda (R)		Mad Money (R)		Early Today	Local Programming		

NOTE: The Tonight Show with Jay Leno ended its second run on February 6, 2014, with The Tonight Show Starring Jimmy Fallon premiering on February 17, 2014.
NOTE: Late Night with Jimmy Fallon ended on February 7, 2014, with Late Night with Seth Meyers premiering on February 24, 2014.

=== Saturday ===
Network		11:00 pm	11:30 pm	12:00 am	12:30 am	1:00 am	1:30 am	2:00 am	2:30 am	3:00 am	3:30 am	4:00 am	4:30 am	5:00 am	5:30 am
NBC		Local programming	Saturday Night Live			Local programming (1:02)									
Fox	Fall	Animation Domination High-Def		Local Programming											
Fox	Summer	Encore Programming		Local Programming											

== By network ==
=== ABC ===
Returning series

- ABC World News Now
- Jimmy Kimmel Live!
- Nightline

=== CBS ===
Returning series

- Late Night with David Letterman
- The Late Late Show with Craig Ferguson
- Up to the Minute

=== FOX ===
Returning series

- Animation Domination High-Def
- Encore Programming

=== NBC ===
Returning series

- Last Call with Carson Daly
- Late Night with Jimmy Fallon
- Mad Money (reruns)
- Saturday Night Live
- Today With Kathie Lee and Hoda (reruns)
- The Tonight Show with Jay Leno

New series

- Late Night with Seth Meyers
- The Tonight Show Starring Jimmy Fallon
