= The New Adventures of Nanoboy =

- Genre: Animated series
- Written by: Joshua Chiang; Leslie Tan; Tan Zie Chiang; Leonard Mah; Jeffrey Lawrence; Wayne Santos; Aaron Chen
- Directed by: Jennifer Lew; Seng Choon Meng; Zaki Ragman; Serene d'Cotta; Pui Mei Chan; Keh Choon Wee; David Low Da Wei
- Voices of: Joe Murray; Hillary Blazer-Doyle; Chio Su-Ping; Mark R. Kaufmann; Christina Sergeant
- Composer: Michael Koh
- Countries of origin: Singapore; Hong Kong; Canada
- Original language: English
- No. of seasons: 1
- No. of episodes: 26 (52 segments)

Production
- Executive producers: Toper Taylor; Steven Ching; Seng Choon Meng; Wong Chi Kong
- Producer: Koo Yuan Peng
- Running time: 22 minutes (2 11-minute segments)
- Production companies: Scrawl Studios; Agogo Media; Cookie Jar Entertainment

Original release
- Release: 19 December 2008 – 13 April 2013

The New Adventures of Nanoboy is an animated series produced by Scrawl Studios Pte. Ltd in Singapore, Media Development Authority of Singapore now Infocomm Media Development Authority, and Agogo Entertainment Limited in Hong Kong and distributed by Cookie Jar Entertainment.

== Premise ==
The series follows the adventures of a 9-year-old boy named Oscar, who has faced some issues in his life. By dealing with these issues, he shrinks down to a microscopic superhero as Nanoboy and he'll stop at nothing to save the Microcosmos from the microbe villains.

== Characters ==
=== Nanosquad ===
- Oscar/Nanoboy - Voiced by Joe Murray. The main hero/character of the series as he is the Team Leader of the Nanosquad. He has the ability to fly and he also has super strength attacks.
- Issac Neuron - Voiced by Hillary Blazer-Doyle. The field scientist of the Nanosquad. He is the only member of the Nanosquad that does not have any powers.
- Corona Jane (CJ) - Voiced by Christina Sergeant. A reformed flu virus in a shapechanging bodysuit. She can shape shift into almost anything.

=== Allies ===
- Tim is Oscar's best friend. He can depend on Oscar in an easygoing way.
- Prof. David Stein is a professor who is researching the Microcosmos. He is Oscar's father.
- Dora is Oscar's mother.
- Vicky is a bossy girl in school. She can prove that she is way better than Oscar.
- Chuck is Oscar's cousin who likes to mess things up. Eventually Oscar apologizes though he is busy but they still play together.
- Commander Flag is a commander who provides mission objectives to the Nanosquad.
- Diva Farangitis is a Diva of the Microcosmos.
- Colonel Skeeter also called Colonel Perry whom he also helps the Nanosquad on a mission to rescue Commander Flag.

=== Villains ===
- Czar Zar is a villain of the Microcosmos.
- Careena Payne is the evil sidekick to Czar Zar. She is Corona Jane's evil sister.
- Ferro is the Pharaoh like person who is the Magnetic Microbe Menace.
- Mito is a mad scientist of the Microcosmos. She wants her voice to be like Farangitis.
- Count Bacula is a vampire of Ransylvania.
- Lacto is a villain of the Microcosmos.
- Billy the Spit is the old west germ rides into town with his quick shot saliva.
- Tony Verrero is an evil Groovester in Groovy Attraction.

== Episodes ==
No.	Title	Directed by	Written by	Original release date
1a	"Attack of the Sparkling Bling Bling"	Seng Choon Ming	Joshua Cheng & Tan Zie Chiang	19 December 2008
1b	"Magnetic Microbe Menace"	Chan Pui Mei & Seng Choon Ming	Tan Zie Chiang	19 December 2008
2a	"The Mitomorphasis"	Serene D'Cotta & Seng Choon Ming	Wayne Santos, Joshua Chiang & Jeff Lawrence	19 December 2008
2b	"Worms!!!"	Serene D'Cotta	Leslie Tan, Wong Chi Kong & Joshua Chiang	19 December 2008
3a	"Nanoboy's Biggest Fan"	Seng Choon Ming	Joshua Chiang & Tan Zie Chiang	21 December 2008
3b	"Nano Elders"	Seng Choon Ming	Jeff Lawrence	21 December 2008
4a	"Smartybot"	Zaki Ragman	Jeff Lawrence	21 December 2008
4b	"Bogzilla"	Serene D'Cotta & Seng Choon Ming	Joshua Chiang & Leonard Mah	21 December 2008
5a	"The Fabulous Ferro Show"	Ken Choon Wee & David Low Da Wei	Jeff Lawrence & Aaron Chen	27 December 2008
5b	"Enter Skeeter"	Seng Choon Ming	Leslie Tan	27 December 2008
6a	"Bite Night"	Zaki Ragman	Leslie Tan	27 December 2008
6b	"Sedation Island"	David Low Da Wei, Aizat Rosli & Zaki Ragman	Leslie Tan	27 December 2008
7a	"Finding Neurons"	Serene D'Cotta & Seng Choon Meng	Joshua Chiang & Leonard Mah	28 December 2008
7b	"Green House Rock"	Keh Choon Wee	Wayne Santos	28 December 2008
8a	"Day of the Germinator"	Serene D'Cotta & Seng Choong Meng	Joshua Chiang	28 December 2008
8b	"Groovy Attraction"	Serene D'Cotta & Zaki Ragman	Leslie Tan	28 December 2008
9a	"The Good, the Bad and the Spit"	Zaki Ragman	Leslie Tan	3 January 2009
9b	"Rise of the Living Dead Cells"	Chan Pui Mei & Seng Choon Meng	Wayne Santos	3 January 2009
10a	"Hail to the King"	Kelvin Ha & David Low	Wayne Santos	3 January 2009
10b	"Sound of Trouble"	Chan Pui Mei & Seng Choon Meng	Leslie Tan	3 January 2009
11a	"Bog's Bogus Buddy"	Zaki Ragman	Tan Zie Chiang	4 January 2009
11b	"Hola! El Coli!"	Serene D'Cotta & Zaki Ragman	Leonard Mah, Tan Zie Chiang & Joshua Chiang	4 January 2009
12a	"Czar Zar's New Clothes"	Zaki Ragman	Tan Zie Chiang	4 January 2009
12b	"Return of the Germinator"	Serene D'Cotta & Zaki Ragman	Leslie Tan	4 January 2009
13a	"Lost in Cyberspace"	Wong Chi Kong & David Low Da Wei	Leslie Tan & Wong Chi Kong	10 March 2009
13b	"Bog to The Future"	David Low Da Wei	Leslie Tan	10 March 2009
14a	"The Czar and I"	Jose Garcon Hurtado	Robert Tan	17 March 2009
14b	"Sublime"	Dean Lewis & Leonard Mah	Mike Reed	
15a	"Cave Fear"	Mike Reed	Nick Tau, Leonard Mah & Phillip Stamp	13 March 2010
15b	"Sound Off"	Thomas Nesbitt	Dean Lewis	13 March 2010
16a	"Me, Myself and Isaacs"	Mike Reed	I. Haque	17 March 2010
16b	"Cloud 9"	Mike Reed	Nicholas Tay	17 March 2010
17a	"Smarty Bot Returns"	Dave Brown	Nick Dubios	25 March 2010
17b	"Chain Reaction"	Thomas Nesbitt	Dean Lewis & Leonard Mah	25 March 2010
18a	"Tale of Two Elasticities"	Mike Reed	Andrew Nicholls & Darrell Vickers	7 April 2010
18b	"X-Static"	Dave Brown	Andrew Nicholls, Darrell Vickers & Dave Brown	7 April 2010
19a	"Coral Grief"	Ian Freedman	Ryan Ingrasias	10 April 2010
19b	"Bride of Nanostein"	Mike Reed	Ryan Ingrasias	10 April 2010
20a	"Garbage In, Garbage Out"	Peter Sheehman & Cheah Phei Sang	David Witt	17 April 2010
20b	"Appearances"	Dave Brown	Nick Dubios & Dave Brown	17 April 2010
21a	"Bend It Like Czar Zar"	Micheal Koizumi	Yanli	6 August 2010
21b	"Finding Memo"	Jose Garcon Hurtado	Nicholas Tay	6 August 2010
22a	"28 Hours Later"	Thomas Nesbitt	Dean Lewis & Leonard Mah	11 August 2010
22b	"Inner Cheese"	Ian Freedman	Chio Su-Ping & Leonard Mah	11 August 2010
23a	"I Am Sheeba Hear Me Roar"	Dave Brown	Nicholas Tay	14 August 2010
23b	"Smell You Later"	Thomas Nesbitt	Ryan Ingrasias	14 August 2010
24a	"Sticky it to The Man"	Thomas Nesbitt	Robert Tan	4 September 2010
24b	"Super Sidekick"	Ian Freedman	Robert Tan	4 September 2010
25a	"Three Is a Crowd"	Dave Brown	John Mein	20 April 2013
25b	"Scab"	Wong Chi Kong	Ryan Ingrasias	20 April 2013
26a	"Phun to the Sun"	Dave Brown	David Witt & Dave Brown	13 April 2013
26b	"Poached"	Ian Freedman	Franklin Young	13 April 2013

== Broadcast ==
In the United States the series aired on Starz Kids & Family from 2008–10 and on Vortexx in 2013. In Israel, the series aired on Arutz HaYeladim. In the United Kingdom, Pop aired the series between 2008–11. In Asia-Pacific, the series aired on Cartoon Network in 2011. Tubi only picked up the first half of the series. In South Africa the series aired on SABC 1 from 2008 - 2013.

== DVD and VOD releases ==
- On 27 July 2010, the first ten episodes of Nanoboy were released on DVD by Mill Creek Entertainment in the US which includes a bonus episode of World of Quest.
- On 2 September 2016, the complete series was made available for streaming on Amazon Prime Video.
