= WWE Saturday Morning Slam =

Professional wrestling television program

- Genre: Professional wrestling
- Created by: Vince McMahon
- Presented by: Tony Dawson
- Starring: WWE roster
- Opening theme: "This Time It's Mine" by Jim Johnston
- Country of origin: United States
- Original language: English
- No. of seasons: 1
- No. of episodes: 38

Production
- Camera setup: Multicamera setup
- Running time: 30 minutes (inc. commercials)

Original release
- Network: The CW (Vortexx)
- Release: August 25, 2012 – May 11, 2013

WWE Saturday Morning Slam, or simply Saturday Morning Slam, is an American professional wrestling television show produced by the WWE. It aired as part of the Vortexx Saturday morning children's programming block on The CW from August 25, 2012, to May 11, 2013.

== History ==
Saturday Morning Slam marked the WWE's first Saturday morning pro-wrestling show since Livewire in 2001; Saban and WWE promoted that the show would feature a weekly match, as well as feature segments such as profiles of WWE performers, behind the scenes footage, and segments promoting WWE's "Be a STAR" anti-bullying campaign.

The program had a TV Parental Guidelines rating of TV-G to meet the standards and practices of the timeslot; thus, more aggressive wrestling moves permissible on WWE's other programming were banned. While the WWE roster performed tamer matches for Saturday Morning Slam, occasional moves or holds that targeted the head or neck were edited out of the broadcast.

In February 2013, WWE announced that a General Manager for the show would be revealed on March 16, 2013. Mick Foley was revealed as the General Manager, where he would serve as such until his contract expired in March 2014.

Saturday Morning Slam was cancelled after one season when Saban Brands and WWE could not come to an agreement on the creative direction of the show.

== Production ==
Saturday Morning Slam was taped on Tuesdays before WWE SmackDown.

== See also ==
- List of former WWE television programming
- WWF Mania
