= Vortexx =

American Saturday morning cartoon programming block (2012–2014)

- Network: The CW
- Launched: August 25, 2012; 14 years ago
- Closed: September 27, 2014; 12 years ago
- Country of origin: United States
- Owner: Saban Brands
- Format: Saturday morning cartoon block
- Running time: 5 hours (7:00 a.m. to noon)
- Original language: English
- Official website: Official website (Archive link)

Vortexx was an American Saturday morning children's television programming block that aired on The CW from August 25, 2012 to September 27, 2014. Programmed by Saban Brands, it replaced Toonzai, a block that was programmed by 4Kids Entertainment until its bankruptcy. The Vortexx block primarily featured animated programs, although it also featured several live-action series, including the Lost Galaxy installment of the Power Rangers franchise (which had been re-acquired by Saban), and the WWE wrestling series Saturday Morning Slam.

The block came to an end on September 27, 2014, and was replaced the following week with a live-action E/I block from Litton Entertainment named One Magnificent Morning. Until KidsClick was launched in July 2017, it was the conclusive Saturday morning animation block across all major five broadcast television networks.

== History ==
On April 6, 2011, following a lawsuit involving the Yu-Gi-Oh! franchise, 4Kids Entertainment, which programmed TheCW4Kids/Toonzai block for the network, filed for Chapter 11 bankruptcy protection. On May 1, 2012, Kidsco Media Ventures, an affiliate of Saban Capital Group, placed a bid to acquire some of their assets. On June 26, 2012, after competition from 4K Acquisition Corp, a subsidiary of Konami, the deal was finalized, with 4K Acquisition receiving the U.S. rights to the Yu-Gi-Oh! franchise and Saban receiving all other assets, including the programming rights to The CW's Saturday morning block. On July 2, 2012, it was announced that Saban Capital Group, via Kidsco Media Ventures, would begin programming the block that fall. On July 12, 2012, it was announced that the block would be named Vortexx, which launched on August 25, 2012.

=== Closure ===
On June 5, 2014, The CW announced that it had entered into a programming agreement with Litton Entertainment to launch a new Saturday morning E/I block replacing Vortexx. The block would be replaced on October 4, 2014 by One Magnificent Morning, a block produced by Litton Entertainment (now Hearst Media Production Group) that features live-action documentary and lifestyle programs aimed at pre-teens and teenagers similarly to a block also introduced by Litton for CW sister channel CBS the previous year. The move came as part of a shift by broadcast television networks towards using their Saturday morning lineup solely to comply with the educational programming requirements mandated by the Federal Communications Commission (FCC), along with the cultural shift towards cable and online video on demand viewing of children's and animated programming. Vortexx aired for the final time on September 27, 2014. It was the last conclusive Saturday morning block across the major American broadcast television networks that primarily featured non-educational programming aimed at children. On July 1, 2017, the KidsClick block from Sinclair Broadcast Group launched on both Sinclair stations and This TV, but had no association with a traditional broadcast network otherwise, KidsClick eventually closed on March 29, 2019.

=== Scheduling ===
Officially the network preferred the block to air from 7:00 a.m. to noon in each time zone, though there were local scheduling variances in some areas that may have moved it to different hours, to Sundays, or split the lineup between Saturday or Sunday, along with local pre-emptions of select shows. The CW Plus stations in the Central, Mountain, and Alaska time zones time zones also aired the block one hour earlier or later, depending on the local time zone, as The CW Plus operates separate feeds based on the network's Eastern and Pacific time zone scheduling for primetime shows. San Antonio CW affiliate KMYS split the Vortexx block over two days, between early Sunday and early Monday mornings before 5:00 a.m. due to an existing arrangement to air Fox's Weekend Marketplace paid programming block in lieu of sister station KABB. WTVW in Evansville, Indiana (which quickly become a CW affiliate on January 31, 2013, due to the market's former affiliate going dark) was unable to schedule the block when it initially began its affiliation with the network, due to contractual obligations to paid programming slots and existing syndicated E/I programming on Saturday mornings through March 2013. The station began carrying Vortexx in its network-recommended timeslot on April 6, 2013, with the station's acquired E/I programming moving to Sunday afternoons.

=== Video-on-demand ===
On April 29, 2013, Saban Brands announced a separate partnership with Kabillion to add programming from the Vortexx block to the existing Kabillion video on demand service for cable providers. The programs were listed on the service without any separate Vortexx subdivision under their individual show titles, with Vortexx promotional advertising. Even after the block's closure, Kabilion continued carry Vortexx's former lineup with other advertising, but as of 2026, only one former Vortexx show (Sonic X) remains on the service.

== Programming ==
Most of the block's programming aired in high definition, with older standard definition content presented in 4:3 or widescreen with stylized pillarboxing and windowboxing.

Vortexx only ran an hour of programming that met the FCC's educational programming guidelines; as a result, The CW's affiliates handled the responsibility of filling the remaining two hours, The CW Plus cable-subchannel affiliates had E/I-compliant programs not acquired from the syndication market built into the national schedule, alleviating stations carrying CW network programming though that feed from the responsibility of purchasing the local rights to such programs.

=== Former programming ===
==== Programming from 4Kids TV ====
Title	Premiere date	End date
Cubix: Robots for Everyone^{E/I} † ‡	August 25, 2012	September 27, 2014
Yu-Gi-Oh! † ‡	August 25, 2012	September 27, 2014
Yu-Gi-Oh! Zexal ‡	August 25, 2012	September 27, 2014
Sonic X ‡	October 6, 2012	September 27, 2014

==== Acquired programming ====
===== Animation =====
Title	Premiere date	End date
Rescue Heroes^{E/I} †	August 25, 2012	August 23, 2014
Iron Man: Armored Adventures	August 25, 2012	November 24, 2012
Justice League Unlimited	August 25, 2012	August 23, 2014
Transformers: Prime	December 8, 2012	June 1, 2013
The New Adventures of Nanoboy (Note: Vortexx is named in the credits but did not directly produce the show.)^{E/I}	March 9, 2013	August 10, 2013
Bolts & Blip	July 13, 2013	September 27, 2014
The Adventures of Chuck and Friends^{E/I}	August 17, 2013	February 8, 2014
The Spectacular Spider-Man † ‡	August 17, 2013	September 27, 2014

===== Live action =====
Title	Premiere date	End date
Power Rangers Lost Galaxy	August 25, 2012	January 12, 2013
WWE Saturday Morning Slam	August 25, 2012	May 11, 2013

===== Anime =====
Title	Premiere date	End date
Dragon Ball Z Kai ‡	August 25, 2012	September 27, 2014
B-Daman Crossfire	August 17, 2013	January 18, 2014
Digimon Fusion	January 25, 2014	September 27, 2014

† - Program transitioned from Kids' WB
‡ - Program transitioned from The CW4Kids/Toonzai

== See also ==
- Toonzai, predecessor of Vortexx.
- KidsClick, a now-defunct syndicated morning cartoon block owned by Sinclair Broadcast Group.
