= The Adventures of Chuck and Friends =

- Also known as: The Adventures of Chuck & Friends
- Genre: Children's television; Preschool
- Developed by: Adam Beechen
- Voices of: Stacey DePass; Fabrizio Filippo; Darren Frost; Gabriel Giammaria; Gabriel Giuliani; Lauren Holly; Lyon Smith; Jo Vannicola; Dale Yim; Laurie Elliott; Jeremy Harris; Sam Barringer
- Opening theme: "Let's Go Me and You", performed by Blair Packham
- Ending theme: "Nothing I Can't Do", Music by Jonathan Evans, Lyrics by Adam Beechen
- Countries of origin: United States; Canada
- Original language: English
- No. of seasons: 2
- No. of episodes: 39 (77 segments)

Production
- Executive producers: Adam Beechen; Doug Murphy; Stephen Davis
- Running time: 22 minutes; (2 11 minute segments)
- Production companies: Nelvana; Hasbro Studios

Original release
- Network: The Hub
- Release: October 15, 2010 – January 9, 2012

The Adventures of Chuck and Friends (also known as The Adventures of Chuck & Friends, Chuck and Friends, or simply Chuck & Friends) is an animated television series based on Tonka's Chuck & Friends toyline. The series was produced by Hasbro Studios with animation production provided by Nelvana. The series ran on The Hub's defunct "HubBub" block, with repeats that aired Saturday mornings on The CW as part of the Vortexx block. The series has several anthropomorphic multiple types of trucks as well as construction vehicles.

== Characters ==
- Chuck (voiced by Gabriel Giammaria) is the main protagonist of the series. He is a male red dump truck with a yellow dump box and manual transmission. Chuck aspires to be a race truck. His parents are Haulie and Porter, and he has an older brother named Rally. He has various friends, and tries to be the best friend he can be, though he can sometimes be selfish and a bit angry. For example, in "Lights, Camera, Trucks", he repeatedly stops a film production in order to get it perfect. Also, in "Fender Bender", when he accidentally gets injured by Boomer by playing tag, he takes advantage of Boomer in order to get out of cleaning his room. It is revealed in "The Best" that he is great at racing on paved roads. He often uses the phrases "Red-hot turbo chargers!" and "Powering pickups!" He, along with his friends, chant the phrase, "Friends for the long haul!".
- Rowdy (voiced by Darren Frost) is a male green garbage truck. He is one of Chuck's friends. Like his type of truck indicates, he enjoys getting filthy, usually to the chagrin of his friends. In one episode, it is revealed that he is great at finding things, although he loses the horn his grandfather gave him in the episode "Mystery, He Rode". He likes sleeping sometimes.
- Handy (voiced by Gabriel Giuliani) is a male blue tow truck. He is one of Chuck's friends. As his name indicates, he has various objects, usually tools, in the bed of his truck. He also has a hook. He is often seen with Soku. In the episode, "Charlie the Screwdriver", it is revealed he has a younger brother named Clutch who is also a tow truck and is missing a front tooth to indicate his young age.
- Digger (voiced by Fabrizio Filippo) is a male yellow backhoe loader. He is one of Chuck's friends. As his name indicates, he enjoys digging. He has a Spanish accent. He refers to his friends as "amigos". In the episode "The Best", it is revealed that he can race best on a track with obstacles. He's very good at keeping an eye on vehicles in danger (hinted in the episode "Sleepdriving Chuck" where he has to keep an eye-out for Chuck after Chuck gets into an accident while playing a game).
- Spill is a male gray and dark orange cement mixer.
- Tiera is a male orange wheel loader.
- Blister is a male orange mobile crane.
- Tween is a female yellow steamroller.
- Biggs (voiced by Jo Vannicola) is a male orange monster truck/pickup truck. He is one of Chuck's friends. As his name indicates, he is a big truck (though he seems to be shorter than Digger). He has a Texas accent which is evidenced by the horns on his and his father's cab roofs. He refers to his friends as his "buddies". In "The Best", it is revealed that he can race best on a dirt track. His catchphrase is "Wa-hoo!".
- Boomer (voiced by Stacey DePass) is a male red fire engine. He is one of Chuck's friends. Boomer seems to have a gut feeling that a plan might not work. This is seen whenever he voices his opinion that he is not sure about something. He also seems to be the most loyal to Chuck. This is seen in "Fender Bender", when, although Chuck had a minor injury on his side, he tended to Chuck.
- Flip (voiced by Sam Barringer) is a new friend of Chuck's. As his name indicates, he is a male stunt truck/bounce-back racer that flips. He has two sides: one that allows him to speed (green), and one that allows him to maneuver around obstacles (blue). He was introduced in the movie, The Big Air Dare. Although he is competitive with Chuck, he turns out to be a caring friend who hates to see Chuck endangered. He is probably part of the regular cast of characters since he also appears in a second season episode. While he still retains his competitive attitude, he was one of the three main characters that lost his first voice actor.
- Haulie (voiced by Lauren Holly) is Chuck's mom. As her name indicates, she is a female yellow forklift. She runs a repair center. In the episode, "Sleepdriving Chuck", it reveals she makes a promise to Digger to keep an eye-out for her son when he goes "sleep-driving".
- Porter (voiced by Blair Williams) is Chuck's dad. As his name indicates, he is a male blue big rig. He runs the diner. He is one of the three characters that lost his first voice actor.
- Soku (voiced by Laurie Elliott) is a male blue souped-up cruiser car. He is one of Chuck's friends. As his name indicates, he is of Japanese origin. This is shown in "Soku-Kun", when Kazuo, his cousin from Japan visits. He is often seen with Handy. He is one of the three characters that lost his first voice actor. Although he and Biggs got bored of making the film perfect, that was revealed in "Lights, Camera, Trucks!".
- Rally (voiced by Lyon Smith) is Chuck's older brother. As his name indicates, he is a male blue racing truck. He seems to be quite successful. Unlike most sibling pairs, Chuck enjoys his brother, even though he is famous. Chuck seems to look up to his older brother and, instead of getting jealous, he aspires to be a racing truck like him. Rally's motto is "Over, around, and through, trucks go and see and do!" This is sometimes repeated by Chuck to his friends, like in episodes such as "The Pothole" as well as in the main title theme song. He has a racing truck friend named "Flash" who mumbles and only Rally can understand him, saying in the episode "Race to the Race" where Flash was also introduced. He is mentioned again in the episode "Charlie the Screwdriver".
- Chassie is a female lilac truck who first appeared in the second season. She enjoys nothing more than to dance away with her friends.
- Chomper is a mergin pile driver with a scrap claw.
- Buzzsaw is a maroon logging big rig with a trencher.
- Philip the Loader is a blue skid-steer telehandler.
- Elmer is a vintage 1930s-40s-inspired school bus who has failing parts and cannot run properly.

== Cast ==
- Stacey DePass – Boomer
- Fabrizio Filippo – Digger
- Darren Frost – Rowdy
- Gabriel Giammaria – Chuck
- Gabriel Giuliani – Handy
- Lauren Holly – Haulie
- Lyon Smith – Rally
- Jo Vannicola – Biggs
- Dale Yim – Soku (season 1)
- Blair Williams – Porter (season 1)
- Sam Barringer – Flip (season 2)
- Jeremy Harris – Porter (season 2)
- Jake Sim – Clutch (season 2)
- Laurie Elliot – Soku (season 2)

== Episodes ==
=== Series overview ===
Season	Episodes	Segments	Originally released	
Season	Episodes	Segments	First released	Last released
1	26	52	October 15, 2010	June 24, 2011
2	13	25	September 12, 2011	January 9, 2012
Special			April 22, 2011	

=== Season 1 (2010–2011) ===
Note: All episodes in this season were directed by Don Kim.

No. overall	No. in season	Title	Written by	Original release date
1	1	"Special Delivery"	Adam Beechen	October 15, 2010
1	1	"Buffing Up"	Adam Beechen	October 15, 2010
2	2	"Tough Break"	Adam Beechen	October 22, 2010
2	2	"Little Big Chuck"	Chara Campanella	October 22, 2010
3	3	"Race to the Race"	Adam Beechen	October 29, 2010
3	3	"When Trucks Fly"	Guy Toubes	October 29, 2010
4	4	"Fort Chuck"	Anne-Marie Perrotta	November 5, 2010
4	4	"A Hop, Slip and a Jump"	Guy Toubes	November 5, 2010
5	5	"The Checkup"	John Semper	November 12, 2010
5	5	"The Shortcut"	Guy Toubes	November 12, 2010
6	6	"Digging Deep"	Chara Campanella	November 26, 2010
6	6	"Lights, Camera, Trucks!"	David Shayne	November 26, 2010
7	7	"Truck and Roll"	Chara Campanella	December 3, 2010
7	7	"Mystery, He Rode"	Anne-Marie Perrotta	December 3, 2010
8	8	"Boomer the Snowplow"	Guy Toubes	December 24, 2010
8	8	"Up All Night"	Holly Melissa Bullard & John Semper	December 24, 2010
9	9	"Choosy Chuck"	Anne-Marie Perrotta	January 7, 2011
9	9	"The Best"	Guy Toubes	January 7, 2011
10	10	"The Pothole"	Adam Beechen	January 28, 2011
10	10	"Chuck's Perfect Plans"	Guy Toubes	January 28, 2011
11	11	"Chuck in Charge"	Anne-Marie Perrotta	February 11, 2011
11	11	"Trucks vs. Wild"	Chara Campanella	February 11, 2011
12	12	"Unidentified Rolling Objects"	Adam Beechen	February 18, 2011
12	12	"On a Role"	Guy Toubes	February 18, 2011
13	13	"Sleep Driving Chuck"	Holly Melissa Bullard & John Semper	February 25, 2011
13	13	"Daredevil Chuck"	Anne-Marie Perrotta	February 25, 2011
14	14	"The Lost Hubcap of Gold"	David Shayne	March 11, 2011
14	14	"Shine On"	Anne-Marie Perrotta	March 11, 2011
15	15	"Where There's a Wheel"	Story by : David Shayne; Teleplay by : James Hereth & Rhonda Smiley	March 18, 2011
15	15	"Flower Power"	Chara Campanella	March 18, 2011
16	16	"Chuck Atomic"	Holly Melissa Bullard & John Semper	March 25, 2011
16	16	"Chuck's Big Break"	Chara Campanella	March 25, 2011
17	17	"Game On"	Guy Toubes	April 8, 2011
17	17	"Kid Stuff"	Guy Toubes	April 8, 2011
18	18	"Contest Countdown"	Guy Toubes	April 15, 2011
18	18	"Revving Up Rally"	Adam Beechen	April 15, 2011
19	19	"Being Biggs"	Chara Campanella	April 29, 2011
19	19	"As the Engine Coughs"	Anne-Marie Perrotta	April 29, 2011
20	20	"Anchors A Wheel"	Anne-Marie Perrotta	May 6, 2011
20	20	"Mind Your Own Business"	James Hereth & Rhonda Smiley	May 6, 2011
21	21	"Brother Borrowing"	Chara Campanella	May 13, 2011
21	21	"When Haulie Met Porter"	Guy Toubes	May 13, 2011
22	22	"The Art of Being Chuck"	Anne-Marie Perrotta	May 20, 2011
22	22	"Senses of Direction"	Guy Toubes	May 20, 2011
23	23	"Beach Blanket Uh-Oh"	James Hereth & Rhonda Smiley	May 27, 2011
23	23	"Hide and Seek"	James Hereth & Rhonda Smiley	May 27, 2011
24	24	"Attack of the 50 Foot Chuck"	James Hereth & Rhonda Smiley	June 3, 2011
24	24	"Soku-Kun"	Guy Toubes	June 3, 2011
25	25	"Join the Club"	Adam Beechen	June 17, 2011
25	25	"Fender Bender"	Chara Campanella	June 17, 2011
26	26	"Did You Hear?"	Guy Toubes	June 24, 2011
26	26	"Bridging the Gap"	Guy Toubes	June 24, 2011

=== Season 2 (2011–2012) ===
The show's second season had been cut in half, and it has 13 episodes, instead of 26.

No. overall	No. in season	Title	Directed by	Written by	Original release date
27	1	"Rowdy's New Rigg"	Brian Harris	Guy Toubes	September 12, 2011
27	1	"Grandpa Treadwell"	Adrian Thatcher	Corey Powell	September 12, 2011
28	2	"Super Sweeper Chuck"	Brian Harris	James Hereth & Rhonda Smiley	September 19, 2011
28	2	"Sitter Shenanigans"	Adrian Thatcher	Adam Beechen	September 19, 2011
29	3	"The Legend of Bigtire"	Brian Harris	Chara Campanella	September 26, 2011
29	3	"Hard at Work"	Adrian Thatcher	Adam Beechen	September 26, 2011
30	4	"Keep on Trackin'"	Brian Harris	Cydne Clark & Steve Granat	October 21, 2011
30	4	"The Bully"	Adrian Thatcher	Amy Forstadt	October 21, 2011
31	5	"Ghost Stories"	Adrian Thatcher	Guy Toubes	October 24, 2011
31	5	"Charlie the Screwdriver"	Brian Harris	Scott Gray	October 24, 2011
32	6	"Chuck Backs Up"	Brian Harris	M.A. Larson	November 7, 2011
32	6	"Speed Indeed"	Adrian Thatcher	Laurie Israel & Rachel Ruderman	November 7, 2011
33	7	"Uncle Vertie's Stunt School"	Brian Harris	Scott Sonneborn	November 14, 2011
33	7	"Dancing Wheels"	Adrian Thatcher	Chara Campanella	November 14, 2011
34	8	"Commercial Trucks"	Brian Harris	James Hereth & Rhonda Smiley	November 28, 2011
34	8	"Rowdy and the Rock Star"	Adrian Thatcher	Sindy McKay	November 28, 2011
35	9	"Prince Chuck"	Brian Harris	Chara Campanella	December 5, 2011
35	9	"The Dirt on Chuck"	Adrian Thatcher	Scott Sonneborn	December 5, 2011
36	10	"Pop Goes the Inner Tube"	Brian Harris	Corey Powell	December 12, 2011
36	10	"Runaway Chuck"	Adrian Thatcher	Cydne Clark & Steve Granat	December 12, 2011
37	11	"The Regifters"	Brian Harris	Guy Toubes	December 19, 2011
38	12	"Mother of All Gifts"	Adrian Thatcher	David Shayne	December 26, 2011
38	12	"Fools for Rules"	Brian Harris	Laurie Israel & Rachel Ruderman	December 26, 2011
39	13	"Mayor Chuck"	Adrian Thatcher	Chara Campanella	January 9, 2012
39	13	"Wallbashers"	Adrian Thatcher	Adam Beechen	January 9, 2012

*Only 2012 episode.

=== Special (2011) ===
Title	Original airdate
"Chuck's Big Air Dare"	April 22, 2011
The special, which introduces a new character called Flip the Race Truck, who teaches kids about the need to work together in order to succeed.

== Home media ==
In 2012, it was announced that Shout! Factory would release episodes of the show on DVD, starting February 14 with "Friends to the Finish".

== Reception ==
Watchdog group Common Sense Media says that The Adventures of Chuck and Friends is "an entertaining series" and "filled with positive messages."
