= Cubix =

Animated television series

- Title card
- Also known as: Cubix: Robots for Everyone
- Genre: Adventure; Action; Comic science fiction
- Created by: Cinepix
- Directed by: Joonbum Heo
- Voices of: Andrew Rannells; Hong Siho; Scottie Ray; Veronica Taylor; Amy Birnbaum; Rachael Lillis; Madeleine Blaustein; Megan Hollingshead; Eric Stuart
- Opening theme: "Cubix Theme"
- Ending theme: "Cubix Theme" (short version)
- Countries of origin: South Korea; United States
- Original languages: English; Korean
- No. of seasons: 2
- No. of episodes: 26

Production
- Executive producers: Alfred R. Kahn; Norman J. Grossfeld; Tom Kenney; Kyoung-joon Hwang; Wook Jung
- Editors: Tim Guru; Alec Puchalski
- Running time: 30 minutes
- Production companies: Daewon Media; 4Kids Productions

Original release
- Network: Kids' WB (U.S.); SBS (South Korea season 1); KBS 2TV (South Korea season 2)
- Release: August 11, 2001 – May 10, 2003

Cubix (Note: Korean: 큐빅스; RR: Kyubigseu; retitled 로보짱 큐빅스 for the KBS broadcast; subtitled Robots for Everyone in the United States) is an animated television series created by Cinepix. Set in 2044, it follows a boy, named Connor, who is fascinated with robots and lives with his father, Graham in Bubble Town, a robot-abundant city that is a center for robotics corporation RobixCorp.

4Kids Entertainment acquired the North American rights to the series, with an English-language dub produced by 4Kids Productions, retaining them until their transfer to Saban Brands in June 2012. In the United States, it aired on Kids' WB from August 11, 2001, until May 10, 2003.

== Production ==
Cubix was created by the Korean company called Cinepix and licensed by 4Kids Entertainment in North America, and aired for two seasons on Kids' WB!, lasting from August 11, 2001, to May 10, 2003. In May 2001, 4Kids announced a partnership with a major quick-service restaurant, who would host a promotion of the series for five weeks nationwide. This would result in a line of toys featured in Burger King kids meals. Toy companies Trendmasters and Jakks Pacific both had licenses to release toys based off the series in retail stores.

The total budget for the series was ₩6 billion.

== Plot and setting ==
Cubix, taking place in the futuristic year of 2044, is the story of a bright-eyed young boy named Connor with a deep fascination for robots. His father, Graham, who dislikes all robots, has never truly been supportive of his efforts. That is, until they move to Bubble Town, a city with "as many robots as people," and the location of RobixCorp. The reason for RobixCorp's global success is the EPU (Emotion Processing Unit), which allows a robot to develop their own unique personality, just like a human being.

Now that Connor's dream has finally come true, he finds himself with one really big problem: everyone in Bubble Town owns a robot, except him. Shortly after his arrival, he meets his nosy neighbor Abby, who sends her flying pet robot, Dondon, to spy on him. Graham, being not so fond of a robot spying on him, attempts to capture Dondon. During his escape, he crashes into Connor, knocking him out. A worried Abby, along with Connor, hop onto her hover scooter, rushing for the one place in town that can fix her friend.

Here, Connor meets Hela, who runs a repair shop called The Botties' Pit. However, to become an employee, he has to fix a robot in less than 24 hours. Of all the robots he could have chosen, Connor picks Cubix, a one of a kind test model referred to as the 'Unfixable Robot.' The Botties all tried to repair him, especially Hela, who could never quite throw him out. Cubix is the one memory left of her father, Professor Nemo, who invented the EPU. Sadly, he vanished after an experiment with a highly volatile substance known as Solex.

Suddenly, a rogue robot inventor named Dr. K runs off with a stolen robot, leaving the Botties' Pit on the verge of collapse. Connor races back inside in a final effort to save Cubix, leaving him trapped inside. This act of kindness jumpstarts Cubix's EPU, bringing him back to life. With only a moment to spare, Cubix saves Connor from the collapsing building. It was never a matter of hardware; rather, of heart, that fixed the "Unfixable Robot". Therefore, Connor passed the test, earning him a place in the club.

That was not the only surprise Cubix had in store, with his design he can transform into virtually anything. Along with their new friends, Connor and Cubix face up against Dr. K to take back the kidnapped bot.

This series follows the adventures and discoveries of the group, as they unravel Dr. K.'s conspiracy and the disappearance of Professor Nemo.

=== Solex ===
Solex was stated to have been discovered after an alien spacecraft crashed outside of RobixCorp, shortly before Professor Nemo's disappearance. It has two forms; the glowing electric blue liquid form prone to random energy fluctuations, and the more stable crystallized form used in most robots. The story suggests that it has a psychic nature as it reacts to sentient thoughts and emotions, even those of robots' EPUs. Solex in both liquid and crystallized form is capable of producing immense power. In its crystallized form, its "radioactive" glow is similar to pure isolated radium.

==== Solex in the first season ====
In the first season, Dr. K forcibly collects Solex from infected robots to utilize in his ultimate plan with the aid of an alien disguising itself as Raska, the RobixCorp spokeswoman, who it is implied to have killed to assume her identity. It is suspected that Solex was originally discovered by Prof. Nemo, who fearing the misuse of its power, separated the liquid Solex into small doses, placing it into random robots (or that the explosion in his lab the day he disappeared caused the Solex he was experimenting with to be transferred into the robots that were in his lab at the time).

Liquid Solex, however, produces unexpected effects in robots; this is referred to as Solex infection. As the EPU is placed under heavy stress or emotions, the uncontrollable energy reaction of the liquid Solex within them causes them to malfunction and go berserk. Besides the behavioral malfunction, the infected robot also gains extreme power far beyond its normal capabilities. This extreme power has the ability to overload the host and cause self-destruction unless the Solex is removed, the robot is deactivated, or its energy levels return to normal.

In the beginning of the first season, the Botties were unaware of Dr. K's reasons for chasing after robots, but eventually learned of the existence of Solex and soon began racing Dr. K in the search, intercepting the last few robots to safely obtain it themselves before he could extract it. Dr. K's plans were delayed when Kan-It unintentionally absorbed half the Solex he had collected, which ultimately ended up in the possession of the Botties. Needing more, Dr. K launched an attack on the Botties Pit to steal the Solex they had obtained, only for Cubix to drive them off while revealing that he possessed crystallized Solex. Changing tactics, Dr. K and the alien devised a plan to deactivate Cubix and take some of his Solex crystals, which they were able to pull off by deceiving the Botties into accepting a gift of explosives from Raska that were disguised as protective robots. Adding Cubix's crystallized Solex to the liquid Solex he already possessed, Dr. K was able to power a humongous EPU he had created, which he then used to transform his HQ into the Kulminator, an enormous robot. In the end, Cubix sacrificed himself to defeat the Kulminator and explode the Solex within them both, scattering it across Bubble Town. Cubix would then be revived by absorbing the scattered Solex (obtaining the ability to speak on his own in the process), ending the threat of Solex for good.

== Characters ==
=== Cubix ===
The titular Cubix is a one of a kind robot built before Professor Nemo's disappearance, who is found deactivated without visible damage, but no way to reactivate him either. He is introduced as part of Connor's initiation ceremony as the robot he chooses to fix. However, he cannot get Cubix to work until Dr. K appears to retrieve Solex from a robot. Connor brings Cubix back to life, just as the building they are in starts to fall apart. His body is made out of a number of cubes, giving him a versatile modular function- by restructuring himself and using different gadgets within the cubes, he can transform into a hover bike, an airplane, a helicopter and plenty more. He can even fly causing no need to transform into a vehicle. Hidden in each cube there is a different gadget with a solution to almost every serious situation. When it comes to fighting, Cubix is exceptionally strong, but often relies on his transformation ability and eccentric strategies to win. He is powered by a generator that runs off crystallized Solex, which is rumored to be the ultimate power source, but nobody knows exactly how it works. Cubix's body is also constructed out of a highly resistant metal that is capable of withstanding devastating amounts of damage without breaking and reversing the effects of rust. He also has additional parts that when added to his structure can increase his strength. Cubix's modular cubes contain special items that may contribute to the transformations like a Glue gun, ForceField generator, and an extra arm. The orange discs on cubix's body can separate and hit enemies with a shock on impact. Cubix can control his body parts to attack enemies when he is pinned and if he has enough energy he is able to generate a small forcefield on his chest to prevent enemies from getting to his power source.

Cubix is a friendly and helpful robot, but lacks speech capability, while speaking seems to be common place among other robots. Usually he just repeats what people around him say, and uses the LED display where his eyes usually are to communicate emotions. However, later in the series this improves greatly and he becomes capable of forming sentences and dialogues, and once he regains the crystallized Solex at the end of the season 1 finale, he repossesses the capacity for independent speech, He uses less of his abilities as the series goes on; however, this may be due to not having as much Solex after fighting Kulminator.

=== Humans ===
==== Botties ====
- Connor: The main human character of the series, Connor is obsessed with robots. He moved to Bubble Town, and soon after joined the "Botties" by fixing the "Unfixable Robot", Cubix. Perpetually optimistic, yet kind of hard-headed, he resents his father for not answering questions about his late mother. He is best friends with Abby, as they often play "virtual battle" video games at her house. Him and the Botties hang out at his dad's donut shop and Hela's repair shop, the Botties' Pit.
- Abby: Connor's 14-year-old neighbor, best human friend, and fellow robot-lover, Abby was the first person to show Connor around Bubble Town. She is a member of the Botties and her pet robot, Dondon, has been her best friend since she was younger. She is a bit impatient and a bit of a procrastinator but she has a sweet compassionate side. Abby loves robots and looks up to Hela almost like the older sister, and secretly wishes to be just like her someday. She can often be found in her room studying robot repair manuals.
- Chip: He may be short but at only 10, he is probably the most intelligent of the Botties. He knows practically everything about robots. He can sometimes be a know-it-all, who only sees things his way. He is actually very insecure about his height and can come across as awkward or nervous. His robot, Cerebrix is a specialized calculation model. He is best friends with Mong.
- Mong: The taller and chubbier member of the Botties, Mong loves snacks and making puns that only he ends up laughing at. He seems dense but he is actually pretty inventive and has a big heart. Highly competitive and a bit prideful, he rushes headlong into things, sometimes ignoring the consequences. His robot is Maximix, originally a fitness trainer model. Mong converted him into a motor bike. He is best friends with Chip.
- Hela Nemo: The daughter of Professor Nemo and the idol of Abby, she is the owner of the Botties Pit. Hela knows almost everything about robot repair. She is pretty even keeled, and is usually a source of advice and comfort to her young apprentices. Her robot team, includes Diagnostix, Mr. Fixit, Ixpressive and Attractix, named Kan-It. She also acts as a motherly-figure to Connor and despite the arguments she has with his stubborn father it.

==== Villains ====
- Dr. K: The main antagonist of the series, Dr. K used to work for RobixCorp, but lost his arm in a lab explosion and now as a rogue robot inventor who uses his smarts for evil. In Season 1, he is after a substance called Solex to build the ultimate robot and destroy Bubble Town. His main robot is Kolossal, but he has his own line of evil robots such as Katastrophe, Kannon, Krab, Klawber, the Kulminator and Kilobot. It is unclear what happened to Dr. K at the end of the series finale, though it is possible that he gave up his evil ways.
- Raska: Bubble Town's most famous celebrity, Raska is the spokesmodel for RobixCorp. Raska does not have any robots of her own besides the Cinematixes that film her. Near the end of Season 1, it is revealed that Raska is the alien from the spaceship that crashed outside RobixCorp, and using her human disguise, became a member of Professor Nemo's team, most likely in order to retrieve the Solex while she also killed the Real Raska. Raska and Dr. K are shown to be in some sort of association in order to acquire Solex for their own goals. For most of the season, Raska's true alien form is only seen on Dr. K's screen when communicating with him and is kept in complete silhouette. Her true from is completely seen in the final two episodes of the first season. She is killed when Dr. K's giant robot is destroyed by Cubix.

=== Miscellaneous ===
- Graham: Connor's father, who owns and runs Bubble Town's most popular donut shop. He dislikes robots, especially the dysfunctional Waitrixes that work at his shop causing him continuous aggravation, yet he developed an exception for Cubix. He believes in good old manual labor and resents how robots have made people lazier over the years. He is a loving father, but has a hard time showing it. Sometimes he cannot quite express how he feels, particularly about his wife's death. This causes a bit of strain on his relationship with Connor. It is also hinted he has a crush on Hela.
- Taryn: Connor's late mother, who supposedly died when he was younger. Connor keeps a picture of her in his room as a memory.
- Professor Nemo: The ultimate robotist scientist dr and professor, Professor Nemo was the one who built Cubix and invented the EPU. He disappeared in the aforementioned lab explosion caused by Solex, but was later found kidnapped by Dr. K. A giant sculpture of the Prof. stands in the grand hall of RobixCorp. He designed all of his robots with a yellow spiral.
- Charles: A spoiled brat and the richest kid in town. Charles is the son of the Mayor and his family has important connections, so he gets all the latest models from RobixCorp. His favorite robot, Quixtreme 5000, is a rare pre-release model given to him as a special birthday gift, that will not be on the market for 10 years! Called Cheetah for short, he can transform into a cherry red Rolls-Royce hover car, a cheetah, and an armored battling robot. This makes Charles think he can gain entry into the Botties. It is implied that he has a bit of a crush on Abby and is jealous of Connor. He often follows them around, showing off.

=== Robots ===
==== Botties' robots ====
- Maximix: Maximix is Mong's robot. Maximix has a unicycle propulsion instead of legs and is also capable of transforming into a Go-kart like vehicle to provide Mong with transportation. Although not as strong as Cubix or Kolossal, Maximix has proven himself to be a formidable opponent on several occasions. He can hold his own against Kolossal or any of Dr. K's robots. Thanks to his unicycle propulsion he can reach high speeds and is quite agile. His personality is similar to his master: hot-headed, competitive and a little conceited, but always reliable. Maximix's voice is similar to that of Arnold Schwarzenegger.
- Dondon: Dondon is Abby's pet robot has been her best friend since she was 6 years old. Dondon is a personal interaction and entertainment robot, outfitted with hovering capabilities allowing him to flutter about for indefinite periods of time. So, although he has wings they are more decorative. Being small and defenseless, Dondon is not a fighter, although there are times when he has shown great courage in order to protect his friends. His features include a video phone inside his chest cavity, secret recording devices, a camera, and a storage pouch. His yellow face also glows in the dark. His personality is very playful and imaginative- he sometimes pretends to be a secret agent for Abby, disguising himself with her jewelry and hair accessories. Though creative, Dondon is needy of Abby and can be quite bashful with strangers.
- Cerebrix: Cerebrix is Chip's robot. Like his master, Cerebrix is more of a thought focused character rather than feeling. Bipedal, with no arms, he is equipped with advanced memory, sensory, computing and processing systems stored in his "large head". He can also fly by means of a retractable propeller stored in an upper compartment of his head. His main functions include a huge sensory array and he is also equipped with two antennae through which he can tap into almost any communication wavelength and cause disturbances, creating confusion in his foes. Also his advanced probability computing system is capable of determining the outcomes of events before they occur. His personality and speech are much more machine-like but what he has to say is usually very important.
- Kan-it: Kan-It is an Attractix model, and the only bot not to be own by a Bottie. Kan-It has a passion for singing, and as such was nicknamed Kan-It because Dr. K, his original master, did not like it. Kan-It speaks in a stereotypical British accent, saying cockney phrases like "Governor" and "Blimey". Kan-It controls his magnetic power by saying Magnet On (Positive Charge), Magnet Off! (Neutral Charge), Reverse Polarity (Negative Charge). Kan-It currently resides at the Botties Pit.

==== Villainous robots ====
- Negator First appearing in the second season, Negator is one of Dr. K's more powerful creations. He was abandoned by Dr. K due to his power being too out of control. He is able to trap people inside of his skeleton and manipulate their thoughts. He is then able to release powerful shockwaves from the negative energy his host gives off. After his battle with Cubix Dr. K put Negator's EPU into Kilobot's upgraded body.
- Kilobot: First appearing in the second season, Kilobot is a vampiric and demonic robot that is far more intelligent than any of his cohorts being able to manipulate people incredibly easy. Kilobot did not have an epu originally until Negator became the host. Dr. K describes him as his finest creation, developed to absorb data from other robots. Kilobot's name comes from the fact that he has the potential to copy the powers of up to 1000 other robots. As such, his power is potentially unlimited. Kilobot originally appeared in a bat-like form, but later upgraded to a bulkier body designed after Cubix's cubes. Kilobot is Cubix's new arch-enemy. In the series finale, he took control of Dr. K's robots and planned an ultimate takeover. But he was permanently deactivated by his own Zombot.
- Klank: Klank was one of Dr. K's first robots from when he was a child. Klank originally had no EPU, so when the Botties found Klank in a disposal room at RobixCorp, they install one to help him adjust to the modern world. Klank's new emotions drive him to seek out Dr. K at an old abandoned house. Unlike Dr. K's other robots, Klank only appears in one episode.
- Kolossal: A Frankenstein's monster-esque robot, Kolossal is the brute of Dr. K's forces. Not too intelligent and continuously relies on his master for orders but almost equal to Cubix in fighting ability, Kolossal serves as Cubix's nemesis in the first part of the show. Kolossal's equipped with various weapons but most importantly a detachable floating platform on his left shoulder where Dr. K. takes seat. Kolossal is big and strong, although bulky he is capable of limited flight and agile high jumps, his left hand is a sort of claw that can be launched to grab things from afar. Most of the time he uses only brute force to win. But Without his master's continuous coordination, he can only complete basic tasks.
- Krab: Squat and crustacean-like, Krab has powerful claws and shoulders that contain a variety of weapons.
- Katastrophe: A robot capable of splitting into two halves. Katastrophe's top half can fly, while the bottom rolls around on a wheel.
- Kannon: An artillery robot developed by Dr. K, his body is an assembly of cannons.
- Klawber: Menace of the skies, Klawber is a super-fast plane that flies through the air.
- Kulminator: Dr. K's second most powerful robot (behind Kilobot). It was once Dr. K's HQ as a giant advertisement tower in an abandoned area of Bubble Town. After Dr. K had gathered enough Solex, he used it to create a humongous EPU which transformed his HQ into a giant four-legged robot. Dr. K piloted it on a course for Bubble Town with intentions to destroy it. The Botties (piloting Krab, Katastrophe, Klawber, and Kannon) attempted to stop it, but it was too big. The Alien then used the Kulminator's ultimate weapon, the Solex Blaster, to destroy Cubix, but he absorbed the energy and then fired a Solex blast of his own, knocking out the Kulminator's shields. Dr. K wanted to retreat, but the Alien was determined to continue, firing the Solex Blaster at everything while Dr. K abandoned ship. Cubix then flung himself into Kulminator, striking its EPU, destroying it and the Alien.
- Kontraption: Dr. K's largest automaton, Kontraption serves as his blimp headquarters after his original base is destroyed. However, Kontraption can also turn into a large robot with great destructive capability.
- Zombots: Dr. K's army of duplicating machines. When defeated, their parts can regenerate into new Zombots. In addition, they can evolve into larger, stronger versions of themselves, and transform other robots into Zombots with their attacks.

== Voice cast ==
Character	Korean Actor	English Actor
Cubix	Hong Siho	Scottie Ray
Haneul (Connor)	Lee Mi-Ja	Andrew Rannells
Yuri (Abby)	Choi Duk Hee	Veronica Taylor
Dondon	Bae Ju-young	Eric Stuart
Mong		Jimmy Zoppi
Plump (Cerebrix)	Bae Ju-young	Jimmy Zoppi
Min Woo (Chip)	Woo Jung Shin	Amy Birnbaum
Locomotor (Maximix)	no voice actor	Frank Frankson
Hela	Jung Mi Sook	Rachael Lillis
Doctor Ball (Diagnostix)	Bae Ju-young	Ed Paul
Professor Nemo	Lee Jong Hyuk	Rodger Parsons
Dr. K	Kim Ki-hyun	Maddie Blaustein
Raska	Lee Hyun-jin	Lauren Kling
Demonix (Kilobot)	Lee Jung-gu	

== List of episodes ==
=== Season 1 (2001-02) ===
No.	Title	Original release date	Prod. code
1	"The Unfixable Robot"	August 11, 2001	101
Connor moves to Bubble Town and meets the Botties; Abby, Mong, Chip and Hela. In order to join the club, he has to fix a robot in 24 hours. He chooses Cubix, the "Unfixable Robot". When Hela brings a WeldNFix gone mad to the Botties Pit, Dr. K shows up to steal it. Luckily, Cubix awakens just in time to save Connor and together, they fight Kolossal and Dr. K to save the Solex infected bot.
2	"Electrix"	August 18, 2001	102
Connor now has a robot of his own, Cubix. But unfortunately, his father, Graham does not feel the same way about Connor's new friend and kicks Cubix out of the house. Charles, the mayor's son, also has a new robot - Quixtreme 5000, and while they are playing cat and mouse at the Botties Pit a Lectrix shows up not feeling well. Hela volunteers to talk to Graham, which only makes things worse - while the Lectrix's Solex goes unstable at the charging station. Dr. K shows up with Kolossal and the battle for Solex ensues.
3	"The Underground of Bubble Town"	August 25, 2001	103
When the power keeps cutting out in Bubble Town, Abby decides to take matters into her own hands and catch the culprit. The rest of the Botties join her mission and soon they are led into Bubble Town's sewer system, where Sewwix is the offender. Soon enough Dr. K and Kolossal show up and manage to break a gas main - sending the Botties on a race to save Sewwix, get Solex, and save Bubble Town from exploding.
4	"The Iron Chef"	September 1, 2001	104
The beloved spokesperson for Robix Corp, Raska is in Bubble Town shooting a commercial for the new Delishix. The Botties sneak onto the set, but not very stealthily - they get caught. Raska thinks that Connor would be the perfect star for the commercial and his house the perfect set. But unfortunately, Delishix is not the perfect robot and it goes berserk, so the Botties chase the Solex infected robot, but so does Dr. K, leading to a fight to the finish.
5	"Dondon for Dinner"	September 22, 2001	105
Robots are disappearing in Bubble Town, but the Botties are on the case. They initially think Dr. K is responsible, but when Dondon narrowly escapes being disintegrated by Disposix, he knows otherwise. But unfortunately, Dondon's voice module gets broken in the attack and leaves him speechless. Finally, Disposix's Solex becomes too unstable not to notice and of course, Dr. K shows up to collect it. Knowing that he will have to put up a fight, he brings Kolossal and Katastrophe to ensure his success.
6	"Heat Wave"	November 17, 2001	106
Mong installs a Hazard Early Response Option unit, simply known as "HERO", in Maximix that he gets from his friend Ixtinguix - the Bubble Town Fire Chief. But when Ixtinguix starts acting strangely, the Botties suggest that he come to the Annual Robot Inspection at Town Hall for a check up. The strange behavior turns into flame-throwing rage, which turns out to be Solex. And soon Dr. K shows up with Kolossal and Kannon to take "kontrol" of the situation.
7	"Hurricane Havoc"	November 24, 2001	107
As a hurricane approaches Bubble Town, Connor and his father, Graham have a huge fight and Connor runs away to Abby's house. As the storm intensifies, Graham gets worried and goes out to look for his son. Hela joins him and they drive all over town. Connor now starts to worry about his missing father and rushes to a highway crash he thinks Graham was in. To make things worse, he does not find him there, because Graham's car is teetering off the side of a cliff. But fortunately, the Botties find them just in time for Cubix to save them all.
8	"Magnetix Personality"	October 6, 2001	108
One of Dr. K's robots, Attractix, runs away from his lair, infected with Solex, and heads straight for Bubble Town. Once there, his super magnet wreaks havoc on the otherwise peaceful town; everything is collected, including Dondon. Dr. K chases his AWOL bot with Kolossal and Krab - but the magnetic field is too strong even for them, Cubix uses his drill mode and brings Connor close enough to save the day and get the Solex.
9	"K's Kages"	January 5, 2002	109
Racing through Bubble Town gets the Botties into trouble again, this time at the Robot Graveyard. A strange robot, named Konfusion appears and leads them into the Robot Zoo. Once they get there, they realize that they have just set foot into Dr. K's secret lab.
10	"Fixed Competition"	December 1, 2001	110
The Annual Robot Grand Prix is on the way - promoting technology and beauty - and all of the Botties are working furiously on their robots to win. Even Charles is planning to take home the prize with his Quixtreme 5000. But unfortunately, Quixtreme is infected with Solex and to make matters worse, Dr. K, Kolossal and Klawber show up, and instead of the final round of the Grand Prix, they go another round with evil.
11	"Office Politix"	January 26, 2002	111
While Hela experiments on Solex, Dr. K and his alien boss launch an attack on the Bottie's pit. The Botties beat the battle-bots, but it turns out to be a fake attack. Raska shows up expressing her concern for their safety and offers Hela the Robix Corp facilities for her research. The Botties go to Robix Corp where they are treated like royalty, until a new robot goes berserk and almost kills them. Hela decides to stick to the Pit, so Raska gives them new miniature safety robots, which turn out to be evil decoys that want to blow up Cubix. Cubix sacrifices himself in order to save everyone else.
12	"Kubix!!! (a.k.a. The Doctor's office)"	February 2, 2002	112
Connor and the rest of the Botties go searching for Cubix or what is left of him - only to find that he has been kollected by Dr. K. due to Attractix's returned memory, they literally fall into Dr. K's lair. Once inside, they have to overcome many obstacles, until Connor can get to Cubix, eventually, he finds him, but only after K has stolen his Solex crystals. Connor also finds out that Raska is an alien and that Nemo has been held prisoner there. Luckily, they fix Cubix and escape the clown tower just as it transforms into the world's largest robot, the Kulminator.
13	"Kulminator (a.k.a. The Unbeatable Robot)"	February 16, 2002	113
Connor, Cubix, and the Botties, in Dr. K's battle bots, attempt to save Bubble Town from Dr. K's enormous robot. Eventually, they wind up having to save each other as Abby gets sucked back inside and Connor runs to her rescue. Eventually, it comes down to Cubix and the big monster and Cubix's only chance to win is by transformation. He changes from mode to mode until he overheats and overwhelms his opponent. But unfortunately, he also overheats and overwhelms himself, and Connor is the only one that can revive him.

=== Season 2 (2003) ===
No.	Title	Original release date	Prod. code
1	"Roller Koaster"	March 15, 2003	214
Dr. K creates the Ultimate Robot, Cubix's major adversary in Season 2. When the UR absorbs the powers of other robots and shape-shifts into look-alikes of them, Cubix is initially blamed for the damage he leaves behind.
2	"The Chipinator"	March 18, 2003	215
Tired of being called "shrimp", Chip gains more than height when he straps on some sinister robotic armor. But it magnifies his anger and changes him into the Chipinator, a cyborg who needs to be cut back down to size - a tall order indeed, even for Cubix.
3	"The Incredible Shrinking Robot"	March 19, 2003	216
To rid Bubble Town of its rodent problem, Cubix, Connor, and a smelly Exterminator Robot shrink down to invade a mouse colony, but wind up face to face with a cat who's a rat - and at the mercy of the big feet of Chip, Mong, and Abby - who can't see them.
4	"Crash Test Pest"	March 17, 2003	217
The kids and Cubix befriend a bunch of invulnerable Crash-Test Dummy Robots, but when the Dummies turn on them, the question becomes "how do you defeat an enemy you can't possibly hurt?".
5	"Tyrannix"	March 20, 2003	218
The annual Tri-hockey competition is taking place - and the underdog Botties Pit team shocks everyone by taking on the dinosaur robots from the all-new Jurrasix line. But Cubix and gang will need more than teamwork to win once Kilobot shape-shifts its way into the contest as Tyrannosaurix - who is set on making Cubix extinct.
6	"Tomorrow's Robots Today"	March 22, 2003	219
Robix Corp is about to present its newest robots, like Demolishix, Correctix and Endurix, a colonizer with the ability to instantly transport himself anywhere to the general public. But things go awry when Kilobot shows up and absorbs Maximix, Dondon, even Endurix and faces off with Cubix.
7	"Media Storm"	March 21, 2003	220
There is a spoilsport in Bubble Town's robot-kite flying contest; jealous Celciux; the new hovering Weather-Control Robot, who feels the skies belong to him, and will defend his place with weather-attacks on Cubix and the kids.
8	"CirKus"	March 29, 2003	221
The robot circus is in town, to everyone's excitement, but when the Botties literally run into a trapeze robot running for her life, they realize that something is not quite right under the big top. During their search to find their new trapeze friend's lost memory the Botties discover an underground EPU erasing station. Dr. K is stealing robots, erasing their memories and this is the last stop before they get shipped to their new home - in Kontraption.
9	"Bubble Town Wishes and EPU Dreams"	April 5, 2003	222
Dr. K manages to zap all of Bubble Town's robots into a "community sleep" and convinces them all to aid him with his nefarious plans. The Botties figure out that the only way to revive their robots without losing them forever is to send Cubix into their bizarre dream world to find a way to wake them all up - and show Kilobot who's boss.
10	"Klank"	April 12, 2003	223
The kids find and activate the last of the Mechanical Men-Bubble Town's earliest robots-outmoded years ago by Nemo's EPU version. But when the old clunker has trouble adjusting to the modern world, the kids add an EPU to his system. It gives him odd powers and the desire to find his beloved old master - a funny robot-loving boy who became Dr. K.
11	"The Importance of Being Maximix"	April 19, 2003	224
Kilobot, sick of Dr. K's shortcomings strikes out on his own and returns to Robix Corp to steal the tools necessary for world domination that K had failed to obtain. But it is not as easy as he thought it would be and he is forced to impersonate Maximix to get the job done. Meanwhile the Botties work on Cubix's new power up module.
12	"War Triangle (a.k.a. The Lost Robots)"	April 26, 2003	225
Dr. K sends his army of zombots to Bubble Town to attack - but shortly thereafter they attack him. Kilobot has his own plans, but their plans do not include Dr. K. Now it is an all out war as Maximix sacrifices himself and Cubix's cubes get disseminated amongst the Zombot army.
13	"Final Showdown (a.k.a The Diehard Machine)"	May 10, 2003	226
It is up to Connor, the rest of the Botties and surprisingly Dr. K to restore Cubix, Maximix, ward off the zombot army, prevent all of Bubble Town's robots from Kilobot's evil brainwashing and beat him once and for all!

== Broadcast ==
=== United States ===
On March 9, 2001, it was announced that The WB had picked up the series for its Kids' WB block for the 2001-02 broadcast season, and premiered on August 11. The series was renewed for a second season on March 4, 2002. The series ended on May 10, 2003, with reruns continuing until the end of the summer.

On May 22, 2003, 4Kids announced that reruns would move to their FoxBox block on Fox for the 2003-04 broadcast season. The move was done to help Fox affiliates provide a half-hour of educational and informational programming. The series ran on the block from August 27, 2003, until June 12, 2004.

The series returned to broadcast on the Toonzai block on The CW (the successor to The WB network) on July 24, 2010. This was also done to comply with E/I requirements, with the series replacing Winx Club (which previously fulfilled E/I criteria for the block, but was pulled once 4Kids lost the license) in its schedule. In 2012, the license for Cubix was purchased by Saban Brands, and the series aired on the Vortexx block, but was removed after four weeks on September 22, 2012, and replaced with another episode of Rescue Heroes. The show was pulled in late 2014 before a Litton Entertainment-produced live-action block replaced Vortexx.

Since September 2007, the show has been streaming online, being uploaded in its entirety as of early 2008, first on the now-defunct 4Kids.TV website and then on Hulu.

=== South Korea ===
The series was first broadcast in its native South Korea on SBS on April 18, 2002, less than a year after premiering in the U.S.

=== International ===
In October 2001, Lacey Entertainment pre-sold Pay-TV rights in the UK to Cartoon Network for a February 2002 airing window. CBBC picked up free-TV rights shortly afterward. The series premiered on Cartoon Network on February 11, 2002, and became a ratings hit in the country on both networks upon its terrestrial premiere. In May 2010, the series began airing on Pop.

Cartoon Network would also pick up pay-TV rights for Scandinavia and Poland. Later picking up additional pay-TV rights for Hungary and Romania, which were planned to launch as additional audio feeds for the Polish version of the network later on in the year.

On November 28, 2001, TF1 and Mediaset picked up free-TV rights in France and Italy. Before that, the series had also been pre-sold to Star Channel (Greece), SIC (Portugal), Nickelodeon (Latin America), Globo TV (Brazil) and Foxtel (Australia). In July 2002, DR (Denmark), TV 2 (Norway) and MTV3 (Finland) picked up free-TV rights for Nordic territories.

== Merchandise ==
=== Toys ===
On July 22, 2001, 4Kids entered into a promotion with Burger King to supply Cubix toys within their Big Kids Meals in the US to promote the series. The promotion took place from August 27 to September 30.

On September 27, 2001, Jakks Pacific was appointed as the master toy partner for the series. The company released a series of action figures in Spring 2002.

== Home Media ==
=== North America ===
On May 20, 2002, 4Kids announced the launch of its home video division and appointed FUNimation Entertainment as exclusive distributor. The division announced that a VHS and DVD release of the series would be released in the fourth quarter of the year.

The first release, entitled "The Unfixable Robot", was planned for a release on VHS and DVD on February 4, 2003 Before being delayed until April 8. It contains the first two episodes of the series and additional bonus features, including tips and tricks for the Showdown video game. The DVD was also included with copies of the game.

An additional DVD entitled Cubix: The Movie - The Battle for Solex, was released on DVD on January 13, 2004. It includes the first four episodes edited together as a feature-length movie.

== Video games ==
In August 2001, The 3DO Company entered into a video game licensing deal with 4Kids to publish video games based on the series in North America. In December, 3DO Europe secured rights outside the Middle East and Asia to release the titles.

The first title, Cubix - Robots for Everyone: Race 'N Robots was released on the PlayStation and the Game Boy Color in 2001. The second, Cubix Robots for Everyone: Clash 'N Bash was released on the Game Boy Advance in 2002. The third and last title, Cubix Robots for Everyone: Showdown, was released on the PlayStation 2 and GameCube in 2003.

== See also ==
- Tobot
- Eon Kid
