= Ocean Mysteries with Jeff Corwin =

- Genre: Documentary; Adventure
- Created by: Dave Morgan
- Written by: Aaron Bauer; Karin McEvoy; Charles Van Steenburgh
- Directed by: Patrick Greene; Robert G. Case; Jan Polak; Jude Gerard Prest; Carolina Pacheco
- Presented by: Jeff Corwin
- Starring: Michael Hunt; Melanie Young; Dave Houston; Thomas Mattern; Hiltrun Ratz; David Scheel; Kelley Voss
- Narrated by: Art Edmonds
- Music by: Michael Baiardi; Tomas Costanza; Evan Frankfort
- Country of origin: United States
- Original language: English
- No. of seasons: 5
- No. of episodes: 122

Production
- Executive producers: Jeff Corwin; Bryan Curb; David Doyle; Dave Morgan; Pete Sniderman; Colin Penney; Scott Helmstedter; Robby Mantegna
- Producers: Carolina Pacheco; Aaron Bauer; Shawn Donnelly; Jane Bloom; Ashley Lansdale; C. Andrew Hall; Justin Aranda; Dan Solomon; Andrew Tew; Sarah Arnoff; Zach Vincent; Amy Lambert; Stephen Lambert; Clifton McDaniel; Jude Gerard Prest; Nancy Singleton Case; Robert G. Case; Anastasia Cronin; Les Nordhauser
- Production locations: Georgia Aquarium, Atlanta, Georgia, United States
- Cinematography: Patrick Greene; Robert G. Case; Jan Polak; Clay Westervelt
- Editors: Jason Elrod; C. Andrew Hall; Chad Simcox; Joel Kraus; Kyle Stuart; Aaron Bauer; Julie T. Kirscher
- Running time: 30 minutes
- Production companies: Ampersand Media; Greenlight Films; Litton Entertainment

Original release
- Network: ABC
- Release: September 3, 2011 – May 21, 2016

Related
- Ocean Treks with Jeff Corwin

Ocean Mysteries with Jeff Corwin is a television program that follows host Jeff Corwin's travels and work in conjunction with the Georgia Aquarium. It aired from 2011 to 2016 on Saturday mornings on ABC affiliates as part of the nature-oriented programming block called Litton's Weekend Adventure, along with complementary shows Jack Hanna's Wild Countdown, Born to Explore with Richard Wiese, and Sea Rescue.

The series focused on wildlife conservation, ocean research, and preserving ocean and ocean-adjacent habitats, with each episode generally featuring one or two ocean-dwelling or near-ocean-dwelling species. Species featured have included various varieties of pinniped (seals, sea lions, and walrus), dolphin, penguins, sea turtles, sting and eagle rays, iguanas, flightless birdss of New Zealand, North American salmon, and whale sharkss. Opening and closing segments generally take place within the environs of the Georgia Aquarium introducing the same or similar species to be profiled on that episode from distant locations such as Southern Africa, California, Hawaii, Alaska, Canada (specifically British Columbia and Quebec), Australia, New Zealand, Florida, the Caribbean Sea, Puerto Rico, the Gulf of Mexico, and Grand Cayman Island.

In 2014, Ocean Mysteries won the Outstanding Travel Program category in the 41st Daytime Creative Arts Emmy Awards. The program's director, Patrick Greene, won an Emmy Award for Outstanding Directing In A Lifestyle/Culinary Program. Reruns of this series will be airing on Antenna TV every Saturday morning beginning August 24, 2019. The CW started airing Ocean Mysteries on October 4, 2025 as part of its One Magnificent Morning programming block.

== Reception ==
In a positive review, Emily Ashby of Common Sense Media wrote, "If you're looking to learn something new as a family, Ocean Mysteries is a great place to start, and it's sure to inspire a new respect for the natural world and a new appreciation for conservationists' efforts to protect it." The Dove Foundation called the television series a "great learning" experience, noting that Corwin discussed sea turtles from both the current day and millennia past. The review said, "He will keep you interested in the research, capture, release and healing of some of the oceans' endangered species."
