= Tree Fu Tom =

British animated children's television series

- Genre: Adventure
- Created by: Daniel Bays
- Written by: Daniel Bays; Douglas Wood; Ian Carney; Moya O'Shea; Darren Jones; Allan Plenderleith; Corey Powell; Richard Preddy; John Loy; Sindy McKay; Richard Dinnick
- Directed by: Adam Shaw; Kitty Taylor
- Starring: Adam Henderson
- Voices of: Lucien Dodge; Sophie Aldred; David Tennant; Mark Bonnar; Tim Whitnall; Samantha Dakin; Sharon D. Clarke; Duncan Wisbey; David Holt; Matt Hill; Joe Ochman
- Composer: Michael Richard Plowman
- Country of origin: United Kingdom
- No. of seasons: 5
- No. of episodes: 72

Production
- Executive producers: Jackie Edwards; Alison Stewart; Bob Higgins; Sander Schwartz
- Producers: Daniel Bays; Mark Bernard
- Running time: 22–25 minutes
- Production companies: FremantleMedia Kids & Family Entertainment (Note: Known as FremantleMedia Enterprises for the first series. Animation outsourced to Blue-Zoo Productions.); BBC In-House Children's Production

Original release
- Network: CBeebies
- Release: 5 March 2012 – 3 October 2016

Tree Fu Tom is a British live-action/CGI children's television series shown on BBC channels in the UK and Sprout and NBC in the USA. It is set in a miniature magical countryside and village area (Treetopolis) on the top a big tree in a British-type woodland. Many of its characters are anthropomorphised arthropods, and it features species of insect that are raised and controlled like cattle on a ranch: aphids, ladybirds, and a rhinoceros beetle. The program is aimed at two to six-year-olds. 72 episodes were produced across five series, premiering in 2012 and ending in 2016. The character of Twigs was recast from season 3 with David Tennant being replaced by Mark Bonnar.

== Premise ==
In each episode, Tom comes out of his house, puts on a power belt, and runs across his lawn towards a crooked tree in the woods protected by a magic shield. Using the power belt, he performs some Tree Fu moves, jumps up, shrinks to insect size as he flies into the tree, and enters the world of Treetopolis. He is skilled in that world's magic, and often gets characters out of scrapes. Some of the characters are four of Tom's friends, Twigs, Squirmtum, Ariela, and Zigzoo. The tree's sap is shown as a glowing orange magic liquid.

At least twice in each episode, Tom has to call on "the big world" for magical help: breaking the fourth wall. As a host, he asks his viewers to make magical moves and say magical words to assist him. The magical power is shown as an orange glow that appears offscreen and flies towards Tom, who uses it to complete the spell.

The movements which the audience are called on to make are particularly beneficial for the development of children with developmental coordination disorder.

The scenario includes magical hoverboards (called "leaf boards"), a sport called Squizzle and many sorts of cakes and snacks that the inhabitants of Treetopolis like to eat.

At the end of each episode, Tom says goodbye to his friends and flies out of the tree's magic field. Back in the normal world, Tom flies up and says to his viewers before he gets back to the surface: "Thanks for helping me in Treetopolis! See you soon for another adventure! Bye for now!". Tom runs out of the woods, across his back lawn, and in through his back door before the credits play.

== Purpose ==
The series was developed in conjunction with the Dyspraxia Foundation with the aim of promoting movement. Foundation specialists Dr Sally Payne and Dr Lynda Foulder-Hughes worked with the series creators to develop the movements Tree Fu Tom uses to create magic. Five percent of children have developmental coordination disorder, and these movements are similar to those used by occupational therapists to help child development. It is also hoped that the spells will help get exercise into the lives of young children.

== Characters ==
Tom (voiced by Sophie Aldred in the UK and Lucien Dodge in the US, and portrayed in live-action by Adam Henderson) is the main character and the titular protagonist of the series. He uses a magical belt to transport into Treetopolis and cast spells with help from the 'big world'. Though he is usually the best at spells, he is a kind, optimistic and modest character and often has to turn to his friends for advice when things go wrong. His popular catchphrases are "Time for Tree Fu!", "Tree Fu Go!", "Oh My Trees!" and "Thanks for your help!" where he shows his viewers how to do the 'big world' magic spell segment.

Twigs (voiced by David Tennant in series 1-2, and Mark Bonnar in series 3-5) is a silly and energetic Scottish acorn sprite who is Tom's sidekick and best friend, and frenemy of Chezz, who he usually encounters conflict. His catchphrases are "I am a Genius", "Wowzers!" and "We're Doomed!". He even turns into an acorn when he is hiding.

Zigzoo (voiced by Tim Whitnall in series 1-4 and David Holt in series 5 in the UK, and Matt Hill in the US) is an eccentric tree frog who is the local inventor at Treetopolis, though not all of his inventions work out quite as well as he (or others) hope. Though it has never officially been confessed, certain episodes seem to suggest he may have a crush on Ariela. One of his catchphrases is "Oh Ribbety Roo".

Squirmtum (voiced by Tim Whitnall in series 1-4 and Duncan Wisbey in series 5 in the UK, and Joe Ochman in the US) is a pill woodlouse who is a miner of sap in the caverns and general-purpose workman, and not the most intelligent of creatures. He can curl into a ball, and in that form he can roll fast. He wears a miner's helmet with a firefly called Flicker as his helmet light. In later seasons, he is shown to frequently attend Tree Fu classes with Tom and Twigs, though he has not been shown to do the magic since the episode "Super Squirmtum".

Ariela (voiced by Samantha Dakin) is the alpha female character, a beautiful but feisty butterfly in charge of the Branch Ranch at Treetopolis. Generally she does not accept help from others, is shown to be impatient in some episodes, and likes to get her own way, but she is always there when her friends need her. She is beautiful, sassy, tomboyish and polite. She is highly competitive and rather impatient. She appears to have the closest relationship with Zigzoo, who invents many gadgets for her ranch throughout the episodes. Also, she cares deeply about her ranch animals, mostly consisting of various beetles and ladybirds.

Rickety McGlum (voiced by Tim Whitnall in series 1-4, and Duncan Wisbey in series 5) is an elderly spider of Treetopolis. He used to be thought of as scary, but is now a close friend to Tom and his friends. He is additionally a Squizzle expert and trainer, a former race car driver (the car in question being named the Turborantula) and leader of the Tree Fu Rangers. He is the grandfather of Racquette.

Treetog the Tree Spirit (voiced and live acted by Sharon D. Clarke) is the plump friendly leader of Treetopolis. She acts as the schoolteacher as well, teaching the young sprite creatures and Tom traditional tree fu spells.

The Mushas (Puffy and Stink) are sister and brother toadstool-type fungi who cause trouble and the main antagonists of the series. They typically use their slime guns (named Stinkifiers) and the Slime Bubbler to spread disgusting slime across Treetopolis. Puffy is the larger, more assertive member, while Stink is the smaller, somewhat more intelligent of the two. Sometimes, however, they are both shown to need saving. Puffy is voiced by Sophie Aldred while Stink is voiced by Tim Whitnall (series 1-4) and Duncan Wisbey (series 5).

Sprites include Chezz, Bertie, Hazel, Lavender, Sweetpea and Goose, who were background characters throughout the first series, but they began to make more frequent appearances in the later seasons. Chezz (voiced by Tim Whitnall in series 1-4, and David Holt in series 5) in particular is a very arrogant, badge-obsessed conker sprite with rhoticism, who likes to show off. Despite having mild respect for Tom, Chezz is usually arguing or attempting to compete with Twigs, often teasing him over his smaller size.

Muru (voiced by David Holt) is an enigmatic, Spanish, praying mantis introduced as part of the new 2016 (or season 5) cast, red magic teacher and friend of Tom. He has a magical stick that is able to rewind and fast forward time. He uses an extension of tree fu magic (red magic) that allows the user to take on attributes of a big-world animal such as the speed of a cheetah or strength of an elephant. He uses a magic red crystal (where red magic gets its name from) which has all the animal spells upon it. He also has the ability to teleport.

Racquette (voiced by Sophie Aldred) is a troublesome female spiderling with a strong northern accent like Rickety, and is Rickety's granddaughter. Although she loves and respects her granddad, she wishes he would allow her to adventure, believing him to be dull and overly cautious. She can be quite headstrong, though she usually realises when she makes a mistake. When bored or upset, she begins to spin webs in her hands. Spiders in this scenario appear to have a web spinning method similar to Spider-Man, where it comes from their wrists.

Rootle and Shade are shy brother and sister dark sprites that live in the deep root caverns. They were afraid that the light would turn them to jelly. Unlike the normal sprites, they lack wings and have snail shells on their heads. Their ears and eyes are much larger than those of the other sprites. Rootle has an odd impediment where he switches the first letters of characters names around (Twom and Tigs, Pink and Stuffy, though he does not do this with Shade).

== Episodes ==
=== Series 1 (5 March - 21 March 2012) ===
Spells that appeared: Build-A-Wall, Mega Attractor, Grow Grow Grow, Super Powers Go, Super Shrinko, Blow-A-Bubble, Power Lasso, Super Squeeze, Super Lifto, Chompa Chompa Chew, Magic Go Back, Super Net Go, Blow Blow Blow, Go Slow, Lifting Wind, Water To Jelly, Helping Hand, Fireflies Unite, Super Speed, Super Clean Go, Dizzy Wind, Giant Shield

- Episode 1: "May the Best Berry Win": the episode is about the Biggest Chuckleberry in Treetopolis contest.

Spells: Build-A-Wall, Mega Attractor

- Episode 2: "Squizzle Quest": a game projectile goes astray when Twigs accidentally uses the mega triple wing throw which makes the squizzle fall into Rickety McGlum's Yard.

Spells: Grow Grow Grow, Super Powers Go

- Episode 3: "Zigzoo the Zero": Zigzoo gets tired of inventions failing.

Spells: Super Shrinko, Grow Grow Grow

- Episode 4: "So Long Greenhorns": Tom and Twigs swap Spell School for running Ariela's ranch, and vice versa.

Spells: Blow-A-Bubble, Power Lasso

- Episode 5: "Hide and Squeak": a game of hide and seek; Squirmtum's fear of the dark gets better for him.

Spells: Super Squeeze, Super Lifto

- Episode 6: "Wishful Thinking": the Mushas get hold of a magic pebble.

Spells: Chompa Chompa Chew, Magic Go Back

- Episode 7: "Zigzoo's Robot": Zigzoo builds a robot of himself that causes other problems than it solves.

Spells: Super Net Go, Power Lasso

- Episode 8: "With Friends Like These": some go off to play Squizzle when they are supposed to be helping Squirmtuum. Puffy and Stink see a chance.

Spells: Super Squeeze, Blow Blow Blow

- Episode 9: "Buzzworthy": bees get into the ranch.

Spells: Go Slow, Lifting Wind

- Episode 10: "Winging It": Squirmtum tries to fly using a jet pack with wings.

Spells: Water To Jelly, Helping Hand

- Episode 11: "Crystal Catastrophe": Treetog's casting crystal gets broken.

Spells: Fireflies Unite, Super Speed

- Episode 12: "Fungus Among Us": the Mushas trick Tom and Twigs into making a mess of Treetog's castle.

Spells: Super Lifto, Super Clean Go

- Episode 13: "The Big Ranch Rodeo": there is a trouble in organising a rodeo.

Spells: Dizzy Wind, Giant Shield

=== Series 2 (3 September – 28 November 2012) ===
Spells that appeared: Mega Mover, Super Freeze, Super Squeeze, Giant Shield, Protecto Tunnel, Super Lifto, Helping Hand, Super Shrinko, Mega Power Boost, Super Pull, Mega Push, Magic Stop, Blow Blow Blow, Super Roll, Build-A-Bridge, Power Smash, Grow Grow Grow, Super Powers Go, Super Arrow, Super Net Go

- Episode 14: "One for All!": Tom leads his under-performing squizzle team on a quest to find the enchanted squizzle.

Spells: Mega Mover, Super Freeze

- Episode 15: "Treefle Tom": Tom and his friends' greed for tasty treefle treats leads to trouble.

Spells: Super Squeeze, Giant Shield

- Episode 16: "The Great Journey": Tom and Twigs get a crash course in being ranchers as they lead an epic baby beetle drive.

Spells: Protecto Tunnel, Super Lifto

- Episode 17: "Not So Fast": Ariela's impatience causes trouble for Tom and Treetopolis.

Spells: Helping Hand, Super Shrinko

- Episode 18: "Hovering Humblebugs": Tom's attempts to attain perfection cause problems for the humblebugs.

Spells: Mega Power Boost, Super Pull

- Episode 19: "Treasure Hunt": Treelings and Mushas are thrown together to compete in Treetopolis' annual treasure hunt.

Spells: Giant Shield, Mega Push

- Episode 20: "Tom's Big Mess": it is the Annual Tidy Up and Tom's careless cleaning efforts lead to disaster.

Spells: Magic Stop, Mega Push

- Episode 21: "Sappy Day": preparations for Sap Day are thrown into turmoil when the Mushas get up to mischief.

Spells: Super Lifto, Blow Blow Blow

- Episode 22: "Grubble Trouble": Tom and Twigs' friendship is not the only thing threatened when Twigs gets a new pet.

Spells: Super Lifto, Super Shrinko

- Episode 23: "Rickety Rescue": when Tom and friends get into trouble, it is up to Rickety to leap to the rescue.

Spells: Super Roll, Build-A-Bridge

- Episode 24: "Weather Bother": Zigzoo invents a weather machine to create perfect conditions for each of his friends.

Spells: Power Smash, Grow Grow Grow

- Episode 25: "Tiny Tom": Tom tackles titanic troubles as he is accidentally shrunk to the size of Twigs' toes.

Spells: Super Powers Go, Super Arrow

- Episode 26: "The Lost Stone": a calm, quiet pond creature accidentally absorbs Tom's sapstone.

Spells: Super Net Go, Helping Hand

=== Series 3 (28 October 2013 – 7 April 2014) ===
Spells that appeared: Super Lifto, Super Shrinko, Chompa Chompa Chew, Chop Chop Chop, Magic Ant, Helping Hand, Super Freeze, Magic Go Back, Grow Grow Grow, Power Lasso, Build-A-Bridge, Power Smash, Super Slime Go, Super Squeeze, Giant Shield

- Episode 27: "Twigs' Big Boost": Twigs eats Ariela's special booster berries, which causes random growth spurts; he desperately tries to hide his dramatically growing hands, ears and feet from his friends.

Spells: Super Lifto, Super Shrinko

- Episode 28: "Spincake Day": it is Zigzoo's job to make all of the spincakes for Spincake Day but he leaves his machine and it quickly goes out of control.

Spells: Chompa Chompa Chew, Chop Chop Chop

- Episode 29: "Harvest Antics": it is Harvest day in Treetopolis, which is almost ruined when a colony of ants almost take over to eat all the food. Tom and Twigs try all sorts of methods to save the food from the ants.

Spells: Super Lifto, Magic Ant

- Episode 30: "Tom's Fan Club": after Tom masters an impossible Super Grab Spell, the Sprites all worship Tom for demonstrating it. It gets in the way when Twigs has to deliver Boing Beetle eggs to Ariela's ranch, who thinks they belong in the barn, but when Twigs and Ariela get stuck in there, Tom must leave his fan club in order to save them.

Spells: Helping Hand, Super Freeze

- Episode 31: "Tom's Teddy": when it is Clean-Up Treetopolis Day Tom loses his Teddy and starts wrongfully accusing Twigs, Ariela, Squirmtum and Zigzoo of stealing it. It was really the Mushas who stole it for their Slime Teddy; when Tom learns what he has done, he makes up for it.

Spells: Magic Go Back, Grow Grow Grow

- Episode 32: "Conkerball Run": Tom and Twigs find Rickety's old racing car, the Turborantula, and learn that he lost the Conkerball Cup in a race with the Mushas. Tom, Twigs and Zigzoo challenge the Mushas to a race to win it back, but Tom and Twigs are competitive and do not work as a team. It appears they might lose the race again, but when the car derails with a panicked Zigzoo, Tom and Twigs must learn what they did wrong.

Spells: Super Lifto, Power Lasso

- Episode 33: "Bad Tom": when the Mushas discover an Invisibility Ring, they use it to frame Tom and Twigs on Spooky Day by doing mean tricks to Zigzoo, Squirmtum and Ariela. They eventually learn not to jump to conclusions.

Spells: Power Lasso, Super Shrinko

- Episode 34: "The Cavern Coaster": when Squirmtum has a lot to do in the Caverns, Zigzoo invents a Cavern Coaster to speed things along. Since the Caverns are dangerous, he is literally carried away with it. He and the Sprites then have to be rescued.

Spells: Build-A-Bridge, Helping Hand

- Episode 35: "Woodgrubs": Tom, Twigs, Zigzoo and Squirmtum investigate the Caverns when there are mysterious Treequakes and see that it is caused by Woodgrubs eating the dead bark.

Spells: Power Smash, Super Slime Go

- Episode 36: "Chuckleberry Tom": Tom uses Chuckleberry Juice to make himself funny; it is fun at first but gets out of hand when Zigzoo almost falls off a bridge and distracts Treetog and the Sprites from cheating Mushas with Boohoo Berries.

Spells: Super Lifto, Magic Go Back

- Episode 37: "Ranger Tom: Fungus Finder": Tom and Twigs empty out a cart full of stuff, but it turns out flowers are useful to wake up Rickety. They soon learn to be prepared when the Mushas, Rickety, Chezz, Hazel and Twigs almost meet their end with a Whirlpool Fungus and a Spritetrap Fungus.

Spells: Super Squeeze, Grow Grow Grow

- Episode 38: "Don't Go Glowy": Tom, Twigs and Ariela are on the search for a Bubbleroot. Ariela's pet Gloworm Glowy eats one and turns into a Gremmel, getting her into trouble, but with Tom and Twigs' help she overcomes her fears of her.

Spells: Helping Hand, Giant Shield

- Episode 39: "Last Squizzle": Tom, Twigs, Stink and Puffy are in need of new squizzles. They need to go looking for them, but with Stink, Puffy and Twigs' unwillingness to cooperate, they get into trouble.

Spells: Super Lifto, Grow Grow Grow

=== Series 4 (30 June – 15 December 2014) ===
Spells that appeared: Magic Hands, Enormo Dome, Helping Hand, Power Lasso, Build-A-Bridge, Mega Mover, Magic Go Back, Super Squeeze, Super Pull, Giant Shield, Super Powers Go, Water To Jelly, Super Screech, Super Speed, Super Lifto, Super Launcher, Super Freeze, Mega Push

- Episode 40: "Tom's Big Spell"

Spells: Magic Hands, Enormo Dome

- Episode 41: "Super Squirmtum"

Spells: Helping Hand, Power Lasso

- Episode 42: "The Golden Spore"

Spells: Build-A-Bridge, Magic Hands

- Episode 43: "Ranger Tom: Super Helper"

Spells: Mega Mover, Magic Go Back

- Episode 44: "Tom and the Warble Weeds"

Spells: Super Squeeze, Super Pull

- Episode 45: "Ranger Tom: Fun Guy!"

Spells: Super Pull, Giant Shield

- Episode 46: "Twigs' Tall Tale"

Spells: Helping Hand, Power Lasso

- Episode 47: "Ranger Tom and the Carrots of Doom"

Spells: Super Pull, Magic Go Back

- Episode 48: "Picture This"

Spells: Super Powers Go, Water To Jelly

- Episode 49: "Dragon Fruit Fiasco"

Spells: Super Screech, Super Speed

- Episode 50: "Ranger Tom: A Badge Too Far"

Spells: Super Pull, Mega Mover

- Episode 51: "King Stink"

Spells: Super Lifto, Super Launcher

- Episode 52: "The Sprite Before Christmas"

Spells: Super Freeze, Mega Push

=== Series 5 (8 February – 3 October 2016) ===
Spells that appeared: Super Lifto, Super Freeze, Funnel Flow, Elephant Power, Speedy Cheetah, Gigantic Gorilla, Mega Power Boost, Mega Attractor, Mega Mover, Blow-A-Bubble, Super Pull, Helping Hand, Digging Desert Mole, Gripping Bear, Crocodile Snap, Chameleon Camouflage, Rhino Charge, Chompa Chompa Chew, Lifting Wind, Magic Go Back, Jumping Kangaroo, Wind Of The Wings

- Episode 53: "Stuck"

Spells: Super Lifto Super Freeze

- Episode 54: "Ranger Tom and the Musha Rangers"

Spells: Super Freeze Funnel Flow

- Episode 55: "Flicker Goes Out"

Spells: Super Lifto Elephant Power

- Episode 56: "It's a Kind of Magic"

Spells: Speedy Cheetah Gigantic Gorilla

- Episode 57: "Dark Sprites"

Spells: Mega Power Boost Mega Attractor

- Episode 58: "Ranger Tom a Friend Indeed"

Spells: Mega Mover Blow-A-Bubble

- Episode 59: "How to Train Your Buggle"

Spells: Super Pull Helping Hand

- Episode 60: "Treenado"

Spells: Elephant Power Digging Desert Mole

- Episode 61: "Friendship Day"

Spells: Helping Hand Super Freeze

- Episode 62: "Box of Tricks"

Spells: Gripping Bear Crocodile Snap

- Episode 63: "Ranger Tom: Beetles and Grubbles"

Spells: Super Pull Helping Hand

- Episode 64: "Need for Less Speed"

Spells: Elephant Power Chameleon Camouflage

- Episode 65: "The Good the Bad and the Mushas"

Spells: Digging Desert Mole Rhino Charge

- Episode 66: "Racquette Risks a Rescue"

Spells: Chompa Chompa Chew Lifting Wind

- Episode 67: "Musha Island"

Spells: Super Lifto Magic Go Back

- Episode 68: "An A-maze-ing adventure"

Spells: Speedy Cheetah Gigantic Gorilla

- Episode 69: "Red Musha Mischief"

Spells: Jumping Kangaroo Speedy Cheetah

- Episode 70: "Ranger Tom and Ginormous George"

Spells: Super Freeze Magic Go Back

- Episode 71: "Dead Branch Challenge"

Spells: Jumping Kangaroo Gripping Bear

- Episode 72: "Raiders of the Lost Bark"

Spells: Gigantic Gorilla Wind Of The Wings
