= 2019–20 United States network television schedule (daytime) =

The 2019–20 daytime network television schedule for the five major English-language commercial broadcast networks in the United States covers the weekday and weekend daytime hours from September 2019 to August 2020. The schedule is followed by a list per network of returning series; no new series or series canceled after the 2018–19 season are included at present, as the daytime schedules of the four major networks that offer morning and/or afternoon programming is expected to remain consistent with the prior television season.

Affiliates fill time periods not occupied by network programs with local or syndicated programming. PBS – which offers daytime programming through a children's program block, PBS Kids – is not included, as its member television stations have local flexibility over most of their schedules and broadcast times for network shows may vary. Fox does not offer daytime network programming nor network news on weekdays; as such, schedules are only included for Saturdays and Sundays, The CW only airs programming on weekdays so therefore it’s not included in the weekend schedule . Also not included are The CW Plus and MyNetworkTV (as the programming services also do not offer daytime programs of any kind), and Ion Television (as its schedule is composed mainly of syndicated reruns).

== Legend ==
- Light yellow indicates talk shows.
- Green indicates soap operas.
- Pink indicates game shows.
- Gold indicates news and public affairs programming.
- Light teal indicates sporting events.
- White indicates local programming.
- Light purple indicates children's and/or E/I-compliant programming.
- Gray indicates encore programming (e.g., reruns of prime-time programming).
- Light Blue indicates other programs not applicable to the above categorizations.
- New series are highlighted in **bold**.

== Schedule ==
- All times correspond to U.S. Eastern and Pacific Time scheduling (except for some live sports or events). Except where affiliates slot certain programs outside their network-dictated timeslots, subtract one hour for Central, Mountain, Alaska, and Hawaii-Aleutian times.
- Local schedules may differ, as affiliates have the option to pre-empt or delay network programs. Such scheduling may be limited to preemptions caused by local or national breaking news or weather coverage (which may force stations to tape delay certain programs in overnight timeslots or defer them to a co-operated station or digital subchannel in their regular timeslot) and any major sports events scheduled to air in a weekday timeslot (mainly during major holidays). Stations may air shows at other times at their preference.

=== Monday–Friday ===
Network		7:00 am	7:30 am	8:00 am	8:30 am	9:00 am	9:30 am	10:00 am	10:30 am	11:00 am	11:30 am	noon	12:30 pm	1:00 pm	1:30 pm	2:00 pm	2:30 pm	3:00 pm	3:30 pm	4:00 pm	4:30 pm	5:00 pm	5:30 pm	6:00 pm	6:30 pm	7:00 pm	7:30 pm
ABC	Fall	Good Morning America				Local and/or syndicated programming				The View		Local and/or syndicated programming		GMA3: Strahan, Sara and Keke		General Hospital*		Local and/or syndicated programming							ABC World News Tonight with David Muir	Local and/or snydicated programming	
ABC	Spring	Good Morning America				Local and/or syndicated programming				The View		Local and/or syndicated programming		Pandemic: What You Need to Know		General Hospital*		Local and/or syndicated programming							ABC World News Tonight with David Muir	Local and/or snydicated programming	
ABC	Summer	Good Morning America				Local and/or syndicated programming				The View		Local and/or syndicated programming		GMA3: What You Need To Know		General Hospital*		Local and/or syndicated programming							ABC World News Tonight with David Muir	Local and/or snydicated programming	
CBS		CBS This Morning				Local and/or syndicated programming		Let's Make a Deal		The Price Is Right		Local and/or syndicated programming	The Young and the Restless		The Bold and the Beautiful	The Talk		Local and/or syndicated programming							CBS Evening News with Norah O'Donnell	Local and/or snydicated programming	
NBC		Today				Today Third Hour		Today with Hoda & Jenna		Local and/or syndicated programming				Days of Our Lives		Local and/or syndicated programming									NBC Nightly News with Lester Holt	Local and/or snydicated programming	
CW		Local and/or syndicated programming																		The Jerry Springer Show (R)		Local and/or syndicated programming					

Notes:

- ABC, NBC and CBS offer their early morning newscasts via a looping feed (usually running until 10:00 a.m. Pacific Time) to accommodate local scheduling in the westernmost contiguous time zones or for use a filler programming for stations that do not offer a local morning newscast; some stations without a morning newscast may air syndicated or time-lease programs instead of the full newscast loop.
- CBS stations have the option of airing Let's Make a Deal at either 10:00 a.m. or 3:00 p.m. Eastern, depending on the station's choice of feed.
- While Third Hour and Hoda and Jenna are part of the Today Show, they are promoted by NBC as their own distinct programs.
- ABC stations have the option of airing General Hospital at 2:00 or 3:00 p.m. Eastern Time, depending on the station's choice of feed.

=== Saturday ===
Network		7:00 am	7:30 am	8:00 am	8:30 am	9:00 am	9:30 am	10:00 am	10:30 am	11:00 am	11:30 am	noon	12:30 pm	1:00 pm	1:30 pm	2:00 pm	2:30 pm	3:00 pm	3:30 pm	4:00 pm	4:30 pm	5:00 pm	5:30 pm	6:00 pm	6:30 pm	7:00 pm	7:30 pm
ABC‡	Fall	Good Morning America				Jack Hanna's Wild Countdown	Ocean Treks with Jeff Corwin	**Oh Baby! with Anji Corley**	Hearts of Heroes	**Oh Baby! with Anji Corley**	Rock the Park	ESPN College Football on ABC															
ABC‡	Winter	Good Morning America				Jack Hanna's Wild Countdown	Ocean Treks with Jeff Corwin	**Oh Baby! with Anji Corley**	Hearts of Heroes	**Oh Baby! with Anji Corley**	Rock the Park	ESPN on ABC sports programming				**XFL**						Local and/or syndicated programming		Local news	ABC World News Tonight with Tom Llamas	Local and/or syndicated programming	
ABC‡	Spring	Good Morning America				Jack Hanna's Wild Countdown	Ocean Treks with Jeff Corwin	**Oh Baby! with Anji Corley**	Hearts of Heroes	**Oh Baby! with Anji Corley**	Rock the Park	ESPN on ABC sports programming										Local and/or syndicated programming		Local news	ABC World News Tonight with Tom Llamas	Local and/or syndicated programming	
CBS	Fall	CBS This Morning Saturday				Lucky Dog	The Henry Ford's Innovation Nation with Mo Rocca	**Mission Unstoppable with Miranda Cosgrove**	Pet Vet Dream Team	Hope in the Wild	**Best Friends Furever With Kel Mitchell**	Local, syndicated and/or CBS Sports programming						College Football Today	College Football on CBS / SEC on CBS							Local and/or syndicated programming	
CBS	Winter	CBS This Morning Saturday				Lucky Dog	The Henry Ford's Innovation Nation with Mo Rocca	**Mission Unstoppable with Miranda Cosgrove**	Pet Vet Dream Team	Hope in the Wild	**Best Friends Furever With Kel Mitchell**	College Basketball on CBS												Local news	CBS Weekend News	Local and/or syndicated programming	
CBS	Spring	CBS This Morning Saturday				Lucky Dog	The Henry Ford's Innovation Nation with Mo Rocca	**Mission Unstoppable with Miranda Cosgrove**	Pet Vet Dream Team	Hope in the Wild	**Best Friends Furever With Kel Mitchell**	Local, syndicated and/or CBS Sports programming												Local news	CBS Weekend News	Local and/or syndicated programming	
CBS	Summer	CBS This Morning Saturday				Lucky Dog	The Henry Ford's Innovation Nation with Mo Rocca	**Mission Unstoppable with Miranda Cosgrove**	Pet Vet Dream Team	Hope in the Wild	**Best Friends Furever With Kel Mitchell**	Local, syndicated and/or CBS Sports programming						PGA Tour on CBS						Local news	CBS Weekend News	Local and/or syndicated programming	
NBC	Fall	Today				Earth Odyssey With Dylan Dreyer		Consumer 101	**A New Leaf**	Vets Saving Pets	The Champion Within with Lauren Thompson	Local, syndicated and/or NBC Sports programming				NBC Sports programming / Notre Dame Football on NBC										Local and/or syndicated programming	
NBC	Winter	Today				Earth Odyssey With Dylan Dreyer		Consumer 101	**A New Leaf**	Vets Saving Pets	The Champion Within with Lauren Thompson	Local, syndicated and/or NBC Sports programming				NBC Sports programming								Local news	NBC Nightly News with Jose Diaz-Balart	Local and/or syndicated programming	
NBC	Spring	Today				Earth Odyssey With Dylan Dreyer		Consumer 101	**Roots Less Traveled**	Vets Saving Pets	The Champion Within with Lauren Thompson	Local, syndicated and/or NBC Sports programming				NBC Sports programming								Local news	NBC Nightly News with Jose Diaz-Balart	Local and/or syndicated programming	
Fox‡	Fall	Xploration Awesome Planet	Xploration Outer Space	Xploration Earth 2050	Xploration Weird But True	Xploration DIY Sci	Xploration Nature Knows Best	Weekend Marketplace		**Big Noon Kickoff**		Fox Big Noon Saturday															
Fox‡	Winter	Xploration Awesome Planet	Xploration Outer Space	Xploration Earth 2050	Xploration Weird But True	Xploration DIY Sci	Xploration Nature Knows Best	Weekend Marketplace				Fox College Basketball										**XFL on Fox**					
Fox‡	Spring	Xploration Awesome Planet	Xploration Outer Space	Xploration Earth 2050	Xploration Weird But True	Xploration DIY Sci	Xploration Nature Knows Best	Weekend Marketplace				Local, syndicated and/or Fox Sports programming															
Fox‡	Summer	Xploration Awesome Planet	Xploration Outer Space	Xploration Earth 2050	Xploration Weird But True	Xploration DIY Sci	Xploration Nature Knows Best	Weekend Marketplace				Local and/or syndicated programming														FOX Major League Baseball	
CW	Fall	Local and/or syndicated programming		Jack Hanna's Into the Wild			This Old House: Trade School	Chicken Soup for the Soul's Animal Tales	Did I Mention Invention?	Local and/or syndicated programming																	
CW	Summer	Local and/or syndicated programming		Jack Hanna's Into the Wild			This Old House: Trade School	**Jewels of the Natural World**	Did I Mention Invention?	Local and/or syndicated programming																	

=== Sunday ===
Network		7:00 am	7:30 am	8:00 am	8:30 am	9:00 am	9:30 am	10:00 am	10:30 am	11:00 am	11:30 am	noon	12:30 pm	1:00 pm	1:30 pm	2:00 pm	2:30 pm	3:00 pm	3:30 pm	4:00 pm	4:30 pm	5:00 pm	5:30 pm	6:00 pm	6:30 pm
ABC	Fall	Good Morning America		This Week with George Stephanopoulos		Local and/or syndicated programming						ESPN on ABC sports programming										Local and/or syndicated programming		Local news	ABC World News Tonight with Tom Llamas
ABC	Winter	Good Morning America		This Week with George Stephanopoulos		Local and/or syndicated programming						ESPN on ABC sports programming						ESPN College Basketball on ABC				Local and/or syndicated programming		Local news	ABC World News Tonight with Tom Llamas
CBS	Fall	Local and/or syndicated programming				CBS News Sunday Morning			Face the Nation		Local and/or syndicated programming	The NFL Today		NFL on CBS											
CBS	Mid-winter	Local and/or syndicated programming				CBS News Sunday Morning			Face the Nation		Local and/or syndicated programming			CBS Sports programming										Local news	CBS Weekend News
NBC		Sunday Today with Willie Geist		Meet the Press		Local and/or syndicated programming						NBC Sports programming												Local news	NBC Nightly News with Kate Snow
Fox	Fall	Local and/or syndicated programming				Fox News Sunday		Local and/or syndicated programming		Fox NFL Kickoff		Fox NFL Sunday		Fox NFL											
Fox	Mid-winter	Local and/or syndicated programming				Fox News Sunday		Local and/or syndicated programming						Fox Sports programming										Local and/or syndicated programming	

Notes:

- (‡) ABC and Fox do not handle programming responsibilities for their programming blocks, but offers syndicated blocks of E/I-compliant programming that are intended for exclusive distribution to their stations. Litton's Weekend Adventure is offered to ABC stations by arrangement with Litton Entertainment and Xploration Station is offered to Fox stations by arrangement with Steve Rotfeld Productions.
- To comply with FCC educational programming regulations, stations may defer certain programs featured in their respective network's E/I program blocks to determined weekend late morning or afternoon time periods if a sporting event is not scheduled in the timeslot or in place of paid programming that would otherwise be scheduled.
- Airtimes of sporting events may vary depending on the offerings scheduled for that weekend. Scheduling overruns may occur due to events going into overtime, weather delays or other game stoppages, preempting scheduled local or syndicated programming.

== By network ==
=== ABC ===
Returning series:

- ABC World News Tonight
- America This Morning
- ESPN on ABC
  - ESPN College Football on ABC
- General Hospital
- GMA3: Strahan, Sara and Keke (retitled from Strahan and Sara)
- Good Morning America
- Litton's Weekend Adventure‡
  - Jack Hanna's Wild Countdown
  - Hearts of Heroes
  - Ocean Treks with Jeff Corwin
  - Rock the Park
- This Week with George Stephanopoulos
- The View

New series:

- Litton's Weekend Adventure‡
  - **Oh Baby! with Anji Corley**
- **XFL**

Not returning from 2018–19:

- Litton's Weekend Adventure‡
  - The Great Dr. Scott
  - Vacation Creation

=== CBS ===
Returning series:

- CBS Dream Team
  - Lucky Dog
  - The Henry Ford's Innovation Nation with Mo Rocca
  - Hope in the Wild
  - Pet Vet Dream Team
- Let's Make a Deal
- The Bold and the Beautiful
- The Price Is Right
- The Talk
- The Young and the Restless
- CBS Evening News
- CBS Morning News
- CBS News Sunday Morning
- CBS Sports
  - College Football on CBS / SEC on CBS
  - NFL on CBS
  - The NFL Today
- CBS This Morning
  - CBS This Morning Saturday
- Face the Nation
- Let's Make a Deal
- The Bold and the Beautiful
- The Price Is Right
- The Talk
- The Young and the Restless

New series:

- CBS Dream Team
  - **Best Friends Furever with Kel Mitchell**
  - **Mission Unstoppable with Miranda Cosgrove**

Not returning from 2018–19:

- CBS Dream Team
  - Dr. Chris: Pet Vet
  - The Inspectors
  - Tails of Valor

=== Fox ===
Returning series:

- Fox News Sunday
- Fox Sports
  - Fox College Football
    (coverage rebranded as Fox Big Noon Saturday)
  - Fox NFL Kickoff
  - Fox NFL Sunday
- Weekend Marketplace
- Xploration Station‡
  - Xploration Awesome Planet
  - Xploration DIY Sci
  - Xploration Earth 2050
  - Xploration Nature Knows Best
  - Xploration Outer Space
  - Xploration Weird But True

New series:

- **Fox Big Noon Kickoff**
- **XFL on Fox**

=== The CW ===
Returning series:

- The Jerry Springer Show (reruns)
- One Magnificent Morning
  - Chicken Soup for the Soul's Animal Tales
  - Did I Mention Invention? with Alie Ward
  - This Old House: Trade School

New series:

- One Magnificent Morning
  - **Jack Hanna's Into the Wild** (moved from Litton's Weekend Adventure)
  - **Jewels of the Natural World**

Not returning from 2018–19:

- One Magnificent Morning
  - Chicken Soup for the Soul's Hidden Heroes
  - Ready, Set, Pet
  - Welcome Home
  - The Wildlife Docs

=== NBC ===
Returning series:

- Days of Our Lives
- Early Today
- Meet the Press
- The More You Know
  - The Champion Within with Lauren Thompson
  - Consumer 101
  - Earth Odyssey with Dylan Dreyer
  - Vets Saving Pets
- NBC Nightly News
- Today
  - Sunday Today with Willie Geist
  - Today Third Hour
  - Today with Hoda & Jenna

New series:

- The More You Know
  - **A New Leaf**
  - **Roots Less Traveled**

Not returning from 2018–19:

- The More You Know
  - Naturally, Danny Seo
  - The Voyager with Josh Garcia

== Renewals and cancellations ==
=== Series renewals ===
==== ABC ====
- The View—Renewed for a 23rd season on September 9, 2019.
- General Hospital—Renewed for a 58th season on September 23, 2019.
- Strahan, Sara and Keke—Renewed for a 2nd season on September 23, 2019.

==== CBS ====
- The Bold and the Beautiful—Renewed for a 32nd season on April 30, 2019.
- Let's Make a Deal—Renewed for an eleventh season on April 30, 2019.
- The Price is Right—Renewed for a 48th season on April 30, 2019.
- The Talk—Renewed for a tenth season on April 30, 2019.
- The Young and the Restless—Renewed for a 47th season on April 30, 2019.

==== Fox ====
- XFL on Fox —Renewed through the 2022 season on May 6, 2019.

==== NBC ====
- Days of Our Lives—Renewed for a 55th season (running through September 2020) on January 8, 2019.

=== Cancellations ===
==== ABC ====
- After initially agreeing to carry the XFL through 2022, in late June 2020, ABC and ESPN Inc. filed to terminate its agreement with the league.

== See also ==
- 2019–20 United States network television schedule (prime-time)
- 2019–20 United States network television schedule (late night)

== Sources ==
- Curt Alliaume. "ABC Daytime Schedule". Curt Alliaume’s Utterly Irrelevant Web Site. Archived from the original on October 15, 2007.
- Curt Alliaume. "CBS Daytime Schedule". Curt Alliaume’s Utterly Irrelevant Web Site. Archived from the original on October 15, 2007.
- Curt Alliaume. "NBC Daytime Schedule". Curt Alliaume’s Utterly Irrelevant Web Site. Archived from the original on October 12, 2007.
