= 2018–19 United States network television schedule (daytime) =

The 2018–19 daytime network television schedule for four of the five major English-language commercial broadcast networks in the United States covers the daytime hours from September 2018 to August 2019. The schedule is followed by a list per network of returning series, and any series canceled after the 2017–18 season.

Affiliates fill time periods not occupied by network programs with local or syndicated programming. PBS – which offers daytime programming through a children's program block, PBS Kids – is not included, as its member television stations have local flexibility over most of their schedules and broadcast times for network shows may vary. Fox does not offer daytime network programming nor network news on weekdays; as such, schedules are only included for Saturdays and Sundays, The CW only airs programming on weekdays and Saturdays so therefore it’s not included on the Sunday schedule .. Also not included are The CW Plus and MyNetworkTV (as the programming services also do not offer daytime programs of any kind), and Ion Television (as its schedule is composed mainly of syndicated reruns).

== Legend ==
- Light yellow indicates talk shows.
- Green indicates soap operas.
- Pink indicates game shows.
- Gold indicates news and public affairs programming.
- Dark green indicates sporting events.
- White indicates local programming.
- Light purple indicates children's and/or E/I-compliant programming.
- Gray indicates encore programming (e.g., reruns of prime-time programming).
- Light blue indicates other programs not applicable to the above categorizations.
- New series are highlighted in **bold**.

== Schedule ==
- All times correspond to U.S. Eastern and Pacific Time scheduling (except for some live sports or events). Except where affiliates slot certain programs outside their network-dictated timeslots, subtract one hour for Central, Mountain, Alaska, and Hawaii–Aleutian times.
- Local schedules may differ, as affiliates have the option to pre-empt or delay network programs. Such scheduling may be limited to preemptions caused by local or national breaking news or weather coverage (which may force stations to tape delay certain programs in overnight timeslots or defer them to a co-operated station or digital subchannel in their regular timeslot) and any major sports events scheduled to air in a weekday timeslot (mainly during major holidays). Stations may air shows at other times at their preference.

=== Monday–Friday ===
Network		7:00 am	7:30 am	8:00 am	8:30 am	9:00 am	9:30 am	10:00 am	10:30 am	11:00 am	11:30 am	noon	12:30 pm	1:00 pm	1:30 pm	2:00 pm	2:30 pm	3:00 pm	3:30 pm	4:00 pm	4:30 pm	5:00 pm	5:30 pm	6:00 pm	6:30 pm
ABC	Fall	Good Morning America				Local and/or syndicated programming				The View		Local and/or syndicated programming		**GMA Day**		General Hospital		Local and/or syndicated programming							ABC World News Tonight with David Muir
ABC	Winter	Good Morning America				Local and/or syndicated programming				The View		Local and/or syndicated programming		Strahan and Sara (**)		General Hospital		Local and/or syndicated programming							ABC World News Tonight with David Muir
CBS		CBS This Morning				Local and/or syndicated programming		Let's Make a Deal		The Price is Right		Local and/or syndicated programming	The Young and the Restless		The Bold and the Beautiful	The Talk		Local and/or syndicated programming							CBS Evening News with Jeff Glor
NBC	Fall	Today				Megyn Kelly Today		Today with Kathie Lee & Hoda*		Local and/or syndicated programming				Days of Our Lives		Local and/or syndicated programming									NBC Nightly News with Lester Holt
NBC	November	Today				Today Third Hour †		Today with Kathie Lee & Hoda*		Local and/or syndicated programming				Days of Our Lives		Local and/or syndicated programming									NBC Nightly News with Lester Holt
NBC	Spring	Today				Today Third Hour †		Today with Hoda & Jenna*		Local and/or syndicated programming				Days of Our Lives		Local and/or syndicated programming									NBC Nightly News with Lester Holt
CW		Local and/or syndicated programming																		The Jerry Springer Show (R)		Local and/or syndicated programming			

Notes:

- CBS owned-and-operated and affiliate stations have the option of airing Let's Make a Deal at either 10:00 a.m. or 3:00 p.m. Eastern, depending on the station's choice of feed.
- (*) The fourth hour of Today was renamed Today with Hoda & Jenna on April 8, 2019, when Jenna Bush Hager succeeded Kathie Lee Gifford as co-host of the program, alongside Hoda Kotb. While Today with Kathie Lee & Hoda/Today with Hoda & Jenna is part of Today, it is promoted as its own distinct program.
- (†) Beginning October 30, in the wake of the abrupt cancellation of Megyn Kelly Today, NBC reformatted the 9:00 a.m. Eastern hour of Today to feature anchors from the main broadcast hosting the third hour – which like Kelly's program is promoted as its own distinct entity – under the "Third Hour" titling.
- (**) GMA Day was renamed Strahan and Sara on January 28, 2019, a decision made to partially downplay its ties to parent series Good Morning America by placing a larger emphasis on its hosts (relegating references to GMA to the program's title logo).

=== Saturday ===
Network		7:00 am	7:30 am	8:00 am	8:30 am	9:00 am	9:30 am	10:00 am	10:30 am	11:00 am	11:30 am	noon	12:30 pm	1:00 pm	1:30 pm	2:00 pm	2:30 pm	3:00 pm	3:30 pm	4:00 pm	4:30 pm	5:00 pm	5:30 pm	6:00 pm	6:30 pm
ABC‡	Fall	Good Morning America		Jack Hanna's Wild Countdown	Ocean Treks with Jeff Corwin	**The Great Dr. Scott**	**The Great Dr. Scott**	Rock the Park	Vacation Creation	Local and/or syndicated programming		ESPN College Football on ABC													
ABC‡	Winter	Good Morning America		Jack Hanna's Wild Countdown	Ocean Treks with Jeff Corwin	**The Great Dr. Scott**	**Hearts of Heroes** (originally Rescue Heroes)	Rock the Park	Vacation Creation	Local and/or syndicated programming		ESPN on ABC sports programming										Local and/or syndicated programming		Local news	ABC World News Tonight with Tom Llamas
CBS	Fall	CBS This Morning Saturday				Lucky Dog	Dr. Chris: Pet Vet	The Henry Ford Innovation Nation with Mo Rocca	The Inspectors	**Hope in the Wild**	Pet Vet Dream Team	College Football on CBS / SEC on CBS													
CBS	Winter	CBS This Morning Saturday				Lucky Dog	Dr. Chris: Pet Vet	The Henry Ford Innovation Nation with Mo Rocca	The Inspectors	**Hope in the Wild**	**Tails of Valor**	Local and/or syndicated programming		CBS Sports programming										Local news	CBS Weekend News
CBS	Spring	CBS This Morning Saturday				Lucky Dog	Dr. Chris: Pet Vet	The Henry Ford Innovation Nation with Mo Rocca	Hope in the Wild	Tails of Valor	The Inspectors	Local and/or syndicated programming		CBS Sports programming										Local news	CBS Weekend News
NBC	Fall	Today				The Voyager with Josh Garcia	**Vets Saving Pets**	**Consumer 101**	Naturally, Danny Seo	**Vets Saving Pets**	The Champion Within with Lauren Thompson	Local and/or syndicated programming		NBC Sports programming										Local news	NBC Nightly News with Jose Diaz-Balart
NBC	Winter	Today				The Voyager with Josh Garcia	**Vets Saving Pets**	**Consumer 101**	Naturally, Danny Seo	**Earth Odyssey with Dylan Dreyer**	The Champion Within with Lauren Thompson	Local and/or syndicated programming		NBC Sports programming										Local news	NBC Nightly News with Jose Diaz-Balart
Fox‡	Fall	Xploration Awesome Planet	Xploration Outer Space	Xploration Earth 2050	Xploration Weird But True	Xploration DIY Sci	Xploration Nature Knows Best	Weekend Marketplace				Fox College Football													
Fox‡	Winter	Xploration Awesome Planet	Xploration Outer Space	Xploration Earth 2050	Xploration Weird But True	Xploration DIY Sci	Xploration Nature Knows Best	Weekend Marketplace				Fox Sports and/or local programming												Local and/or syndicated programming	
CW	Fall	Local and/or syndicated programming		The Wildlife Docs	**Did I Mention Invention? with Alie Ward**	**Ready, Set, Pet**	**Welcome Home**	This Old House Trade School	Chicken Soup for the Soul's Hidden Heroes	Local and/or syndicated programming															
CW	Winter	Local and/or syndicated programming		Ready, Set, Pet	The Wildlife Docs	This Old House: Trade School	**Welcome Home**	**Chicken Soup for the Soul's Animal Tales**	Did I Mention Invention? with Alie Ward	Local and/or syndicated programming															

=== Sunday ===
Network		7:00 am	7:30 am	8:00 am	8:30 am	9:00 am	9:30 am	10:00 am	10:30 am	11:00 am	11:30 am	noon	12:30 pm	1:00 pm	1:30 pm	2:00 pm	2:30 pm	3:00 pm	3:30 pm	4:00 pm	4:30 pm	5:00 pm	5:30 pm	6:00 pm	6:30 pm
ABC		Good Morning America		Local and/or syndicated programming		This Week with George Stephanopoulos		Local and/or syndicated programming						ESPN on ABC sports programming								Local and/or syndicated programming		ABC World News Tonight with Tom Llamas	Local news
CBS	Fall	Local and/or syndicated programming		CBS News Sunday Morning			Face the Nation		Local and/or syndicated programming	The NFL Today		NFL on CBS													
CBS	Mid-winter	Local and/or syndicated programming		CBS News Sunday Morning			Face the Nation		Local and/or syndicated programming			CBS Sports programming												CBS Weekend News	Local news
NBC		Sunday Today with Willie Geist		Meet the Press		Local and/or syndicated programming						NBC Sports programming												Local news	NBC Nightly News with Kate Snow
Fox	Fall	Local and/or syndicated programming				Fox News Sunday		Fox NFL Kickoff		Fox NFL Sunday		Fox NFL													
Fox	Mid-winter	Local and/or syndicated programming				Fox News Sunday		Local and/or syndicated programming				Fox Sports and/or local programming												Local and/or syndicated programming	

Notes:

- (‡) ABC and Fox do not handle programming responsibilities for their programming blocks, but offers syndicated blocks of E/I-compliant programming that are intended for exclusive distribution to their stations. Litton's Weekend Adventure is offered to ABC stations by arrangement with Litton Entertainment and Xploration Station is offered to Fox stations by arrangement with Steve Rotfeld Productions.
- To comply with FCC educational programming regulations, stations may defer certain programs featured in their respective network's E/I program blocks to determined weekend late morning or afternoon time periods if a sporting event is not scheduled in the timeslot or in place of paid programming that would otherwise be scheduled.
- Airtimes of sporting events may vary depending on the offerings scheduled for that weekend. Scheduling overruns may occur due to events going into overtime, weather delays or other game stoppages, preempting scheduled local or syndicated programming.

== By network ==
=== ABC ===
Returning series:

- ABC World News Tonight
- America This Morning
- ESPN on ABC
  - ESPN College Football on ABC
- General Hospital
- Good Morning America
- Litton's Weekend Adventure‡
  - Jack Hanna's Wild Countdown
  - Ocean Treks with Jeff Corwin
  - Rock the Park
  - Vacation Creation
- Strahan and Sara
- This Week
- The View

New series:

- GMA Day (retitled Strahan and Sara)
- Litton's Weekend Adventure‡
  - **Hearts of Heroes** (formerly Rescue Heroes)
  - **The Great Dr. Scott**

Not returning from 2017–18:

- The Chew
- Litton's Weekend Adventure‡
  - Sea Rescue
  - The Wildlife Docs (moved to The CW's One Magnificent Morning)

=== CBS ===
Returning series:

- The Bold and the Beautiful
- CBS Dream Team
  - Dr. Chris: Pet Vet
  - The Henry Ford's Innovation Nation with Mo Rocca
  - The Inspectors
  - Lucky Dog
  - Pet Vet Dream Team
- CBS Sports
  - College Football on CBS / SEC on CBS
  - NFL on CBS
  - The NFL Today
- CBS Evening News
- CBS Morning News
- CBS News Sunday Morning
- CBS This Morning
  - CBS This Morning Saturday
- Face the Nation
- Let's Make a Deal
- The Price is Right
- The Talk
- The Young and the Restless

New series:

- CBS Dream Team
  - **Hope in the Wild**
  - **Tails of Valor**

Not returning from 2017–18:

- CBS Dream Team
  - The Open Road with Dr. Chris

=== Fox ===
Returning series:
- Fox News Sunday
- Fox Sports
  - Fox College Football
  - Fox NFL Kickoff
  - Fox NFL Sunday
- Weekend Marketplace
- Xploration Station‡
  - Xploration Awesome Planet
  - Xploration DIY Sci
  - Xploration Earth 2050
  - Xploration Nature Knows Best
  - Xploration Outer Space
  - Xploration Weird But True

=== The CW ===
Returning series:

- One Magnificent Morning
  - Chicken Soup for the Soul's Hidden Heroes
  - This Old House: Trade School
  - The Wildlife Docs

New series:

- **The Jerry Springer Show** (reruns)
- One Magnificent Morning
  - **Chicken Soup for the Soul's Animal Tales**
  - **Did I Mention Invention? with Alie Ward**
  - **Ready, Set, Pet**
  - **Welcome Home**

Not returning from 2017–18:

- One Magnificent Morning
  - Brain Games: Family Edition
  - Dog Whisperer with Cesar Milan: Family Edition
- The Robert Irvine Show

=== NBC ===
Returning series:

- Days of Our Lives
- Megyn Kelly Today
  (cancelled/ended on October 26)
- The More You Know
  - The Champion Within with Lauren Thompson
  - Naturally, Danny Seo
  - Vets Saving Pets
  - The Voyager with Josh Garcia
- NBC Nightly News
- Today
  - Today with Kathie Lee & Hoda
    (retitled Today with Hoda & Jenna on April 8, 2019)

New series:

- **Today Third Hour**
- The More You Know
  - **Consumer 101**
  - **Earth Odyssey with Dylan Dreyer**

Not returning from 2017–18:

- The More You Know
  - Give
  - Health + Happiness with Mayo Clinic
  - Journey with Dylan Dreyer
  - Wilderness Vet

== Renewals and cancellations ==
=== Series renewals ===
==== CBS ====
- The Bold and the Beautiful—Renewed for a 32nd season on August 9, 2018.
- Let's Make a Deal—Renewed for an eleventh season on August 9, 2018.
- The Price is Right—Renewed for a 48th and 49th season on June 20, 2017.
- The Talk—Renewed for a tenth season on August 9, 2018.
- The Young and the Restless—Renewed for three additional seasons (encompassing its 44th, 45th and 46th seasons) on June 20, 2017.

==== NBC ====
- Days of Our Lives—Renewed for a 54th season (running through September 2019) on March 8, 2018.

=== Cancellations/series endings ===
==== NBC ====
- Megyn Kelly Today—Cancelled on October 26, 2018, four days after Megyn Kelly, in a panel segment on the appropriateness of blackface in Halloween costumes, made comments that were widely criticized as a defense of the historically racially insensitive practice.

== See also ==
- 2018–19 United States network television schedule (prime-time)
- 2018–19 United States network television schedule (late night)

== Sources ==
- Curt Alliaume. "ABC Daytime Schedule". Curt Alliaume’s Utterly Irrelevant Web Site. Archived from the original on October 15, 2007.
- Curt Alliaume. "CBS Daytime Schedule". Curt Alliaume’s Utterly Irrelevant Web Site. Archived from the original on October 15, 2007.
- Curt Alliaume. "NBC Daytime Schedule". Curt Alliaume’s Utterly Irrelevant Web Site. Archived from the original on October 12, 2007.
