= 2017–18 United States network television schedule (daytime) =

The 2017–18 daytime network television schedule for four of the five major English-language commercial broadcast networks in the United States covers the weekday daytime hours from September 2017 to August 2018. The schedule is followed by a list per network of returning series, and any series canceled after the 2016–17 season.

Affiliates fill time periods not occupied by network programs with local or syndicated programming. PBS – which offers daytime programming through a children's program block, PBS Kids – is not included, as its member television stations have local flexibility over most of their schedules and broadcast times for network shows may vary. Fox does not offer daytime network programming nor network news on weekdays; as such, schedules are only included for Saturdays and Sundays, The CW only airs programming on weekdays and Saturdays so therefore it’s not included on the Sunday schedule . Also not included are The CW Plus and MyNetworkTV (as the programming services also do not offer daytime programs of any kind), and Ion Television (as its schedule is composed mainly of syndicated reruns).

== Legend ==
- Light yellow indicates talk shows.
- Green indicates soap operas.
- Pink indicates game shows.
- Gold indicates news programming.
- White indicates local programming.
- Gray indicates encore programming (e.g., reruns of prime-time programming).
- Light blue indicates other programs not applicable to the above categorizations.
- New series are highlighted in **bold**.

== Schedule ==
- All times correspond to U.S. Eastern and Pacific Time scheduling (except for some live sports or events). Except where affiliates slot certain programs outside their network-dictated timeslots, subtract one hour for Central, Mountain, Alaska, and Hawaii–Aleutian times.
- Local schedules may differ, as affiliates have the option to pre-empt or delay network programs. Such scheduling may be limited to preemptions caused by local or national breaking news or weather coverage (which may force stations to tape delay certain programs in overnight timeslots or defer them to a co-operated station or digital subchannel in their regular timeslot) and any major sports events scheduled to air in a weekday timeslot (mainly during major holidays). Stations may air shows at other times at their preference.

=== Monday-Friday ===
Network		7:00 am	7:30 am	8:00 am	8:30 am	9:00 am	9:30 am	10:00 am	10:30 am	11:00 am	11:30 am	noon	12:30 pm	1:00 pm	1:30 pm	2:00 pm	2:30 pm	3:00 pm	3:30 pm	4:00 pm	4:30 pm	5:00 pm	5:30 pm	6:00 pm	6:30 pm
ABC	Fall	Good Morning America				Local and/or syndicated programming				The View		Local and/or syndicated programming		The Chew		General Hospital		Local and/or syndicated programming							ABC World News Tonight with David Muir
ABC	Summer	Good Morning America				Local and/or syndicated programming				The View		Local and/or syndicated programming		The Chew (R)^{‡}		General Hospital		Local and/or syndicated programming							ABC World News Tonight with David Muir
CBS	Fall	CBS This Morning				Local and/or syndicated programming		Let's Make a Deal		The Price is Right		Local and/or syndicated programming	The Young and the Restless		The Bold and the Beautiful	The Talk		Local and/or syndicated programming							CBS Evening News
CBS	Winter	CBS This Morning				Local and/or syndicated programming		Let's Make a Deal		The Price is Right		Local and/or syndicated programming	The Young and the Restless		The Bold and the Beautiful	The Talk		Local and/or syndicated programming							CBS Evening News with Jeff Glor
NBC		Today				Megyn Kelly Today*		Today with Kathie Lee & Hoda*		Local and/or syndicated programming				Days of Our Lives		Local and/or syndicated programming									NBC Nightly News with Lester Holt
CW	Fall	Local and/or syndicated programming																The Robert Irvine Show		Local and/or syndicated programming					
CW	Summer	Local and/or syndicated programming																The Robert Irvine Show (R)^{†}		Local and/or syndicated programming					

Notes:

- CBS owned-and-operated and affiliate stations have the option of airing Let's Make a Deal at either 10:00 a.m. or 3:00 p.m. Eastern, depending on the station's choice of feed.
- (*) - While Megyn Kelly Today and Kathie Lee & Hoda are technically considered part of Today, they are also promoted as their own distinct programs.
- ‡ The Chew aired its last original episode on June 15; reruns of the program would continue to air until September 7, 2018.
- † The Robert Irvine Show aired its last original episode on May 25; reruns of the program would continue to air until September 7, 2018. Its replacement would be reruns of The Jerry Springer Show, which ended production after the 2017–18 season.

=== Saturday ===
Network		7:00 am	7:30 am	8:00 am	8:30 am	9:00 am	9:30 am	10:00 am	10:30 am	11:00 am	11:30 am	noon	12:30 pm	1:00 pm	1:30 pm	2:00 pm	2:30 pm	3:00 pm	3:30 pm	4:00 pm	4:30 pm	5:00 pm	5:30 pm	6:00 pm	6:30 pm
ABC	Fall	Good Morning America		Local and/or syndicated programming				Jack Hanna's Wild Countdown	Ocean Treks with Jeff Corwin	Sea Rescue	The Wildlife Docs	Rock the Park	Vacation Creation	ESPN College Football on ABC											
ABC	Winter	Good Morning America		Local and/or syndicated programming				Jack Hanna's Wild Countdown	Ocean Treks with Jeff Corwin	Sea Rescue	The Wildlife Docs	Rock the Park	Vacation Creation	ESPN on ABC and/or local programming				ESPN on ABC programming						Local news	ABC World News Tonight with Tom Llamas
CBS	Fall	CBS This Morning Saturday				Local and/or syndicated programming		Lucky Dog	Dr. Chris Pet Vet	The Henry Ford's Innovation Nation with Mo Rocca	The Inspectors	Lucky Dog	The Open Road with Dr. Chris	SEC on CBS											
CBS	Winter	CBS This Morning Saturday				Local and/or syndicated programming		Lucky Dog	Dr. Chris Pet Vet	The Henry Ford's Innovation Nation with Mo Rocca	The Inspectors	Lucky Dog	The Open Road with Dr. Chris	CBS Sports and/or local programming					CBS Sports programming					Local news	CBS Weekend News
CBS	April	CBS This Morning Saturday				Local and/or syndicated programming		Lucky Dog	Dr. Chris Pet Vet	The Henry Ford's Innovation Nation with Mo Rocca	The Inspectors	Lucky Dog	**Pet Vet Dream Team**	CBS Sports and/or local programming					CBS Sports programming					Local news	CBS Weekend News
NBC	Fall	Today				Local and/or syndicated programming		The Voyager with Josh Garcia	Wilderness Vet	Journey with Dylan Dreyer	Naturally, Danny Seo	Give	Heart of a Champion with Lauren Thompson	NBC Sports and/or local programming				NBC Sports programming						Local news	NBC Nightly News with Jose Diaz-Balart
NBC	April	Today				Local and/or syndicated programming		The Voyager with Josh Garcia	Wilderness Vet	Journey with Dylan Dreyer	Naturally, Danny Seo	**Health + Happiness with Mayo Clinic**	Heart of a Champion with Lauren Thompson	NBC Sports and/or local programming				NBC Sports programming						Local news	NBC Nightly News with Jose Diaz-Balart
FOX		Local and/or syndicated programming				Xploration Awesome Planet	Xploration Outer Space	Xploration Earth 2050	Xploration Weird But True	Xploration DIY Sci	Xploration Nature Knows Best	Weekend Marketplace				Fox Sports and/or local programming									
The CW	Fall	Local and/or syndicated programming		Dog Whisperer with Cesar Milan: Family Edition				**Brain Games: Family Edition**	**This Old House: Trade School**	Local and/or syndicated programming															
The CW	Winter	Local and/or syndicated programming		Dog Whisperer with Cesar Milan: Family Edition				This Old House: Trade School	Chicken Soup for the Soul's Hidden Heroes	Local and/or syndicated programming															

=== Sunday ===
Network		7:00 am	7:30 am	8:00 am	8:30 am	9:00 am	9:30 am	10:00 am	10:30 am	11:00 am	11:30 am	noon	12:30 pm	1:00 pm	1:30 pm	2:00 pm	2:30 pm	3:00 pm	3:30 pm	4:00 pm	4:30 pm	5:00 pm	5:30 pm	6:00 pm	6:30 pm
ABC		Local and/or syndicated programming		Good Morning America		Local and/or syndicated programming		This Week with George Stephanopoluos		ESPN on ABC and/or local programming														Local news	ABC World News Tonight with Tom Llamas
CBS	Fall	Local and/or syndicated programming				CBS News Sunday Morning			Face the Nation		Local and/or syndicated programming	NFL Today		NFL on CBS											
CBS	Mid-winter	Local and/or syndicated programming				CBS News Sunday Morning			Face the Nation		Local and/or syndicated programming	CBS Sports and/or local programming												Local news	CBS Weekend News
NBC		Local and/or syndicated programming		Sunday Today with Willie Geist		Meet the Press		Local and/or syndicated programming				NBC Sports and/or local programming												Local news	NBC Nightly News with Kate Snow
FOX	Fall	Local and/or syndicated programming				Fox News Sunday		Local and/or syndicated programming		Fox NFL Kickoff		Fox NFL Sunday		Fox NFL (and sometimes local programming)											
FOX	Mid-winter	Local and/or syndicated programming				Fox News Sunday		Local and/or syndicated programming				Fox Sports and/or local programming												Local and/or syndicated programming	

== By network ==
=== ABC ===
Returning series:

- ABC World News Tonight
- The Chew
- General Hospital
- Good Morning America
- The View

=== CBS ===
Returning series:

- The Bold and the Beautiful
- CBS Evening News
- CBS This Morning
- Let's Make a Deal
- The Price is Right
- The Talk
- The Young and the Restless

=== The CW ===
Returning series:

- The Robert Irvine Show

=== NBC ===
Returning series:

- Days of Our Lives
- NBC Nightly News
- Today
  - Megyn Kelly Today
  - Kathie Lee & Hoda
- The More You Know
  - The Voyager with Josh Garcia
  - The Champion Within with Lauren Thompson
  - Give
  - Wilderness Vet with Dr. Oakley
  - Journey with Dylan Dreyer
  - Naturally, Danny Seo

New series:

- The More You Know
  - **Health + Happiness with Mayo Clinic**

== Renewals and cancellations ==
=== Series renewals ===
==== CBS ====
- The Bold and the Beautiful—Renewed for a 31st season on June 20, 2017.
- Let's Make a Deal—Renewed for a ninth season on June 20, 2017.
- The Price is Right—Renewed for a 48th and 49th season on June 20, 2017.
- The Talk—Renewed for an eighth season on June 20, 2017.
- The Young and the Restless—Renewed for three additional seasons (encompassing its 44th, 45th and 46th seasons) on June 20, 2017.

==== NBC ====
- Days of Our Lives—Renewed for a 52nd season (running through September 2018) on February 21, 2017.

=== Cancellations/series endings ===
==== ABC ====
- The Chew—Canceled on May 23, 2018; the series concluded with its last first-run episode on June 28, 2018 with repeats continuing until September 7.

==== The CW ====
- The Robert Irvine Show—Its last original episode aired on May 24, 2018; cancellation was formally announced on June 13, 2018.

== See also ==
- 2017–18 United States network television schedule (prime-time)
- 2017–18 United States network television schedule (late night)

== Sources ==
- Curt Alliaume. "ABC Daytime Schedule". Curt Alliaume’s Utterly Irrelevant Web Site. Archived from the original on October 15, 2007.
- Curt Alliaume. "CBS Daytime Schedule". Curt Alliaume’s Utterly Irrelevant Web Site. Archived from the original on October 15, 2007.
- Curt Alliaume. "NBC Daytime Schedule". Curt Alliaume’s Utterly Irrelevant Web Site. Archived from the original on October 12, 2007.
