= Claire Thomas (disambiguation) =

Claire Thomas is a food enthusiast.

Claire Thomas may also refer to:

- Claire Curtis-Thomas, politician
- Claire Thomas (Harukana Receive), a character in the manga series Harukana Receive
