= Claire Thomas =

American food enthusiast and blogger (born 1986)

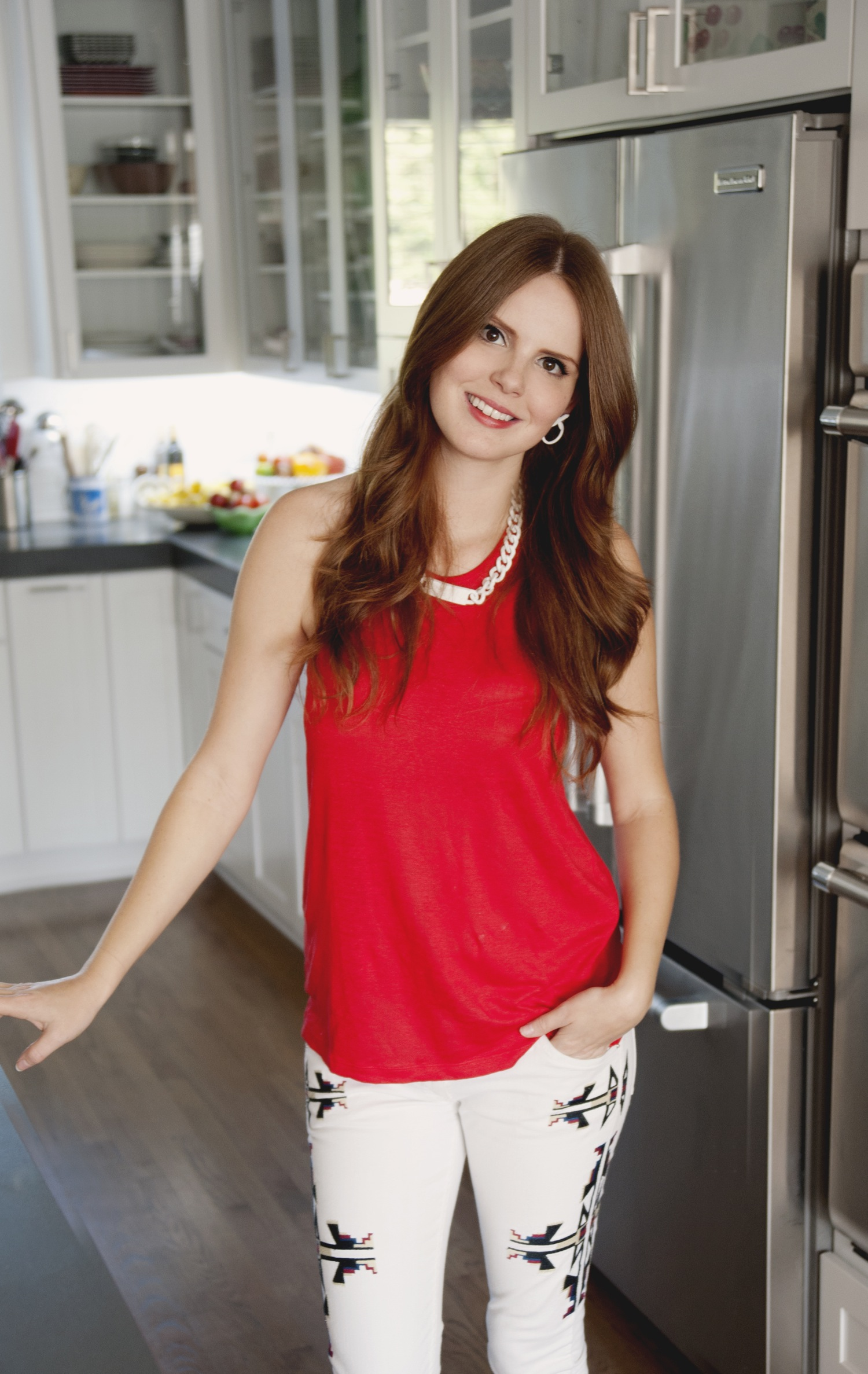
- Thomas in 2012
- Born: Claire Alexandria Thomas; 18 June 1986 (age 40); Los Angeles, California, U.S.
- Education: Claremont McKenna College
- Culinary career
- Television show: Food for Thought

Claire Alexandria Thomas (born 18 June 1986 in Los Angeles, California) is an American food enthusiast and blogger who once hosted her own ABC series Food for Thought with Claire Thomas, an E/I show which was a part of the weekend morning Litton's Weekend Adventure block.

Thomas was picked up by Litton Entertainment, which programs the block for ABC, after she began a food blog called The Kitchy Kitchen, including her photos, videos and recipes, plus interviews with wine connoisseurs, food specialists and restaurant chefs. The food videos she produced came to the attention of Green Dot Films, her father Brent's company, which hired her to direct an advert for McDonald's in 2011. Following that she directed for Pepperidge Farm, General Mills, Del Taco and other big brands. Subsequently, Litton appointed her as the host for Food for Thought. Thomas's first cookbook, published by Simon & Schuster, appeared in 2014.

Thomas is a member of the Directors Guild of America (DGA).

== Personal life ==
Thomas's father is Brenton and her mother is Jane (née McNamara). Her father was the art director on the Ridley-Scott directed "1984" Apple Macintosh commercial. She has a younger sister Amanda and younger brother Henry. In April 2015 she married Craig DePriester. They had a son named James in 2017.
