= Pillow Head Hour =

Children's TV programming block

The Pillow Head Hour was a one-hour block of E/I-compliant programming on the now-defunct Kids' WB. It featured two half-hour shows, framed by segments hosted by Pillow Head youth correspondent "Gisselle".

== History ==
=== 2005 ===
The Pillow Head Hour originated on June 4, 2005, to promote the final episodes of Jackie Chan Adventures. Airing at 8:00 am (Eastern time), 7:00 am (Central/Pacific time), it consisted of two new episodes of Jackie Chan Adventures, along with certain promotions of characters from Kids' WB! shows talking about and showing off their "Pillow Head Hair" (what their hair would look like if they had just woken up from bed). Activities included "1001 Uses for Pillow Head Hair," in which the character shows what their Pillow Head Hair can be used for, as well as "Guess the Pillow Head," where a silhouette of a Kids' WB! character with Pillow Head Hair was shown at the beginning of a commercial break, and when the show returned it was revealed who the Pillow Head was. There was no host at this time, only an unseen announcer. Actor Field Cate was one of the featured children waking up in a bed with Pillow Head Hair, surrounded by cartoon characters. This was discontinued on July 2, 2005, when Kids' WB! changed schedule, replacing Jackie Chan Adventures with Teen Titans and The Batman. On KidsWB.com, however, Gisselle, the "Pillow Head Reporter," could be seen doing a "Pillow Head Report," where viewers asked her questions about various elements of pop culture, including Kids' WB!

=== 2006 ===
Earlier in 2006, Kids' WB! had announced that they would be discontinuing their weekday afternoon block, extending the Saturday block by one hour and thus it would not be affected by time zone. Therefore, the Pillow Head Hour was reborn in the new hour at 7 am on January 7, 2006, but this time, it consisted of two episodes of a Kids' WB! show, and was hosted by Gisselle, who was interviewing guests talking about and showing off their "Pillow Head Hair." Gisselle also spoke during the promos that told viewers what show was coming up next, as well as acting during the commercial bumpers with guests saying things like, "Wake up, Pillow Heads!"

On July 1, 2006, the Pillow Head Hour aired for the final time before being discontinued again on July 8, when it was replaced by two Yu-Gi-Oh! episodes to reformat the lineup to the "Sizzlin' Summer Lineup."

Gisselle's Pillow Head reports were removed from KidsWB.com on November 4, 2006, when KidsWB.com reformatted their website.

== See also ==
- Kids' WB
