= Danni Washington =

American activist

Daniell "Danni" Washington
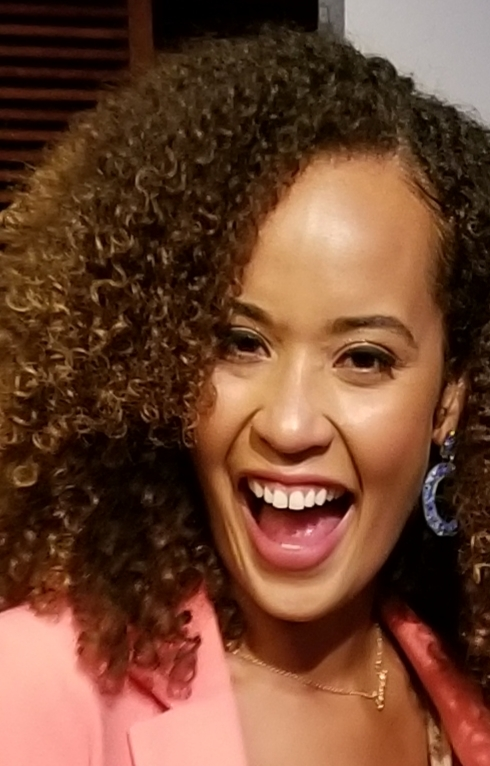
- Washington in November 2019
- Born: Miami, Florida, U.S.
- Education: Rosenstiel School of Marine, Atmospheric, and Earth Science, University of Miami (BS)
- Known for: Xploration Station Nature Knows Best (2016–2017)
- Scientific career
- Fields: Marine Biology
- Website: www.danniwashington.com

Daniell "Danni" Washington is an American activist, artist, and presenter who campaigns for cleaner, plastic-free oceans. She founded the Big Blue & You, a non-profit organization. Washington presents the STEM-themed TV show Xploration Nature Knows Best, Mission Unstoppable, and web series Science the $#!* out of it.

== Early life and education ==
Washington grew up in Miami, Florida, and is of Jamaican heritage. She studied Marine Science and Biology at the University of Miami's Rosenstiel School of Marine, Atmospheric, and Earth Science, where she graduated in 2008.

== Career ==
When she was 21, Washington and her mother both co-founded Big Blue & You, an activist group aimed at teaching young people about the seas of the world and the issues that they face.

Washington won $10,000 for the Follow Your Heart tour, sponsored by Roxy, and invested it into starting the ArtSea Festival in Virginia Key Beach, Miami, aimed at using crafts, design and interactive stalls to engage children with science and the ocean. The beach was chosen given its significance as the only major beach in the area open to people of color during the Jim Crow era. Washington herself dresses as the 'Mocha Mermaid' for the event to encourage young women into marine conservation. Caribbean National Weekly honored Washington as one of 'Jamaican Diaspora 20 under 40' for her work with ocean activism and as the 'Mocha Mermaid'.

In 2016, Washington began to present her own TV show on the Xploration Station run of programs for Fox. The show was called Xploration Nature Knows Best and discusses the ways scientists take inspiration from the natural world to achieve major feats of engineering and innovation. The show ran for two seasons, and Washington is considered to be the first African American woman to host her own science show. She co-hosted two seasons of 'Science the $#!* Out of It' with comedian Krystyna Hutchinson. In 2019, she became a part of team for the female led STEM show Mission Unstoppable.

In 2018, Washington was MC for a panel discussion at the American Black Film Festival, and an invited speaker alongside fellow ocean activist Anna Oposa at the International School Brunei Borneo Global Issues Conference attended by Sarah, Crown Princess of Brunei. The same year she was awarded a Global Impact Award at the EarthXGlobal Gala at the Perot Museum of Nature and Science alongside Nike, Buzz Aldrin, Garrett Boon, Parley for the Oceans, and John R. Seydel III.

In 2024, Washington began voicing Tantie Chantale in Disney Jr.'s Ariel, and in 2025, she voiced the animator in the Penguin short of Disney's How NOT to Draw.

=== Untamed Science ===
Washington worked as an on-camera person and filmmaker for three years on Untamed Science. This initiative collaborated with Pearson Publishing to create approximately 200 K–12 educational films. It is estimated that approximately 65% of students in classrooms across USA may have used these videos before they graduate.

=== Xploration Nature Knows Best (2016 - 2017) ===
Washington worked as the host for Xploration Nature Knows Best, a STEM education TV series. This series focuses on technological advances that are bio-inspired. As of November 3 of 2019, it was syndicated on FOX and available on Amazon Prime, Hulu, Yahoo View, and Roku.

=== Mission Unstoppable (2019 - Present) ===
Washington joins host Miranda Cosgrove as part of an all-female leadership team that features current leading women in STEM on the CBS show Mission Unstoppable.

=== Bold Women in Science (2021) ===
Washington published Bold Women in Science: 15 Women in History You Should Know on September 14, 2021. The book contains biographies of 15 female scientists and has a target audience of 8 to 12-year-old children.

== Honors and awards ==
- Green For All Fellow (2007-2010)
- ROXY Follow Your Heart Tour Winner
- Toyota & Audubon Society Together Green Fellow (2011)
- CA Technologies 2017 STEM10 Innovator
- 2018 EarthX Global Gala Emerging Female Leader of the Year Awardee
