= The More You Know (TV programming block) =

Educational program block on NBC

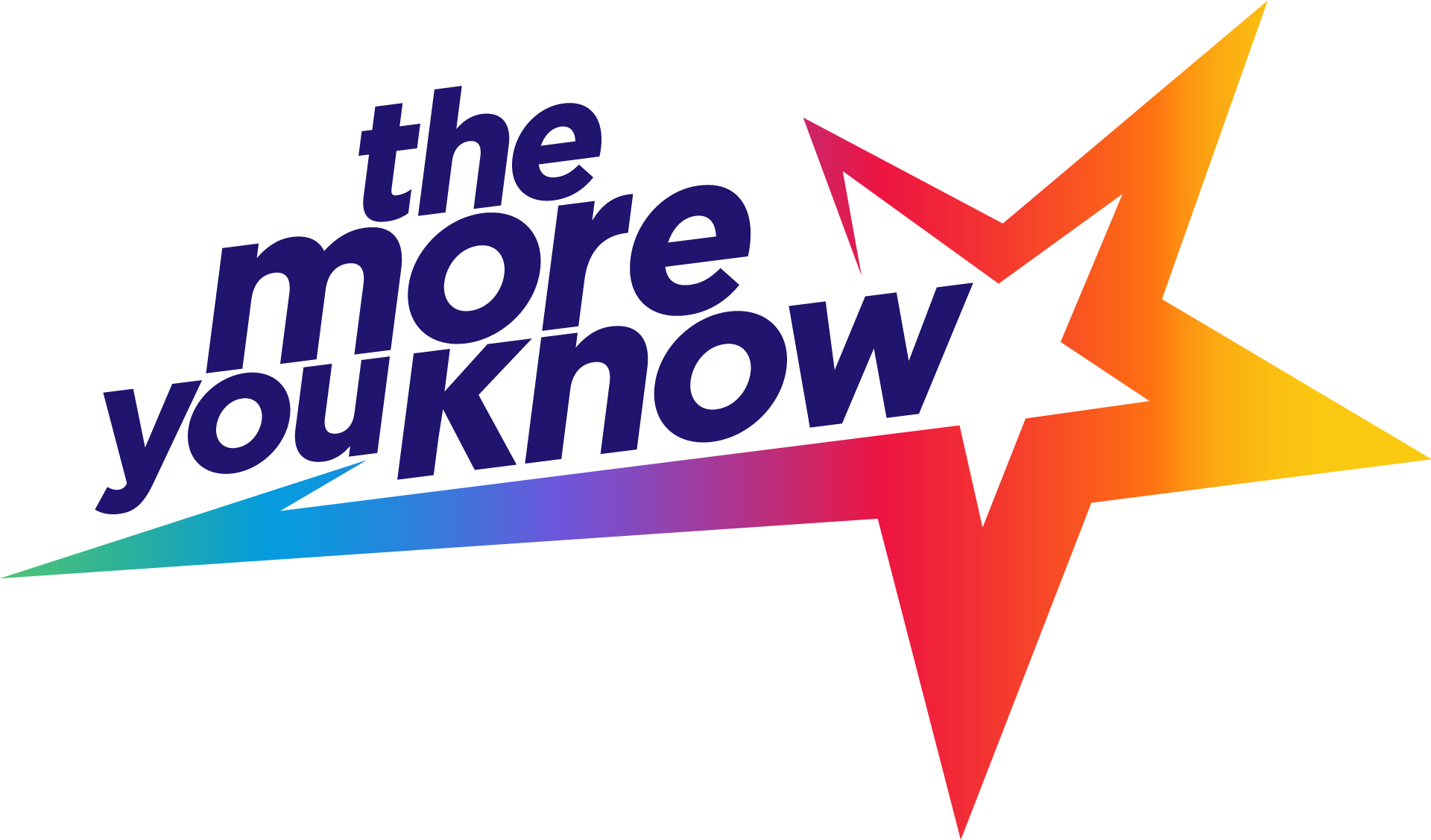
- Network: NBC (2016–present); Cozi TV (2017–present); Telemundo (2018–present)
- Launched: October 8, 2016; 10 years ago (NBC); January 6, 2018; 8 years ago (Telemundo; MiTelemundo)
- Country of origin: United States
- Owner: leased by Hearst Media Production Group subsidiary of Hearst Television
- Format: Weekend morning E/I block
- Running time: 3 hours (10:00 a.m. to 1:00 p.m.) (2016–present) (On some affiliates); 2 hours (10:00 a.m. to 12:00 p.m.) (2021–present) (On NBC O&Os)
- Original language: English

The More You Know (TMYK) is an American programming block that is programmed by Hearst Media Production Group (formerly Litton Entertainment), and debuted on October 8, 2016, as a replacement for the animation block NBC Kids. It airs on weekend mornings on NBC and Telemundo, and is replayed Sunday mornings on sister network Cozi TV. The block's programs are also available through all of NBC's video on demand venues, including the network's site/app, Peacock, and cable/satellite services.

Based on NBCUniversal's series of public service campaigns of the same name, the three-hour weekend morning block features live-action programming aimed at pre-teens and teens ages 10 to 18. Like its predecessor, the block met federally mandated educational programming guidelines.

It is Hearst's fourth E/I-centric programming block across the major American television networks, joining three other Hearst blocks: Weekend Adventure (ABC), Dream Team (CBS), and One Magnificent Morning (The CW).

As of January 6, 2018, a version of the block also airs on NBC's sister network Telemundo under the name MiTelemundo, with all of its programs dubbed in Spanish. Telemundo had previously aired a Spanish-language version of NBC Kids under the same title.

== History ==
On February 24, 2016, NBCUniversal announced that it would discontinue its existing weekend morning block NBC Kids, which was programmed by Sprout (now Universal Kids), in favor of The More You Know, a new, three-hour block produced by Litton Entertainment, that would feature live-action educational programming aimed at preteens, teenagers, and their parents. The block serves as a brand extension of The More You Know—a series of public service campaigns first launched by NBC in 1989.

NBC Kids aired for the final time on September 25, 2016, on NBC (December 31, 2017, on Telemundo). It was thought to be the last conclusive Saturday morning block across the major American commercial broadcast networks that primarily featured non-educational and educational children's programming. Such content has gradually fallen out of favor because of the E/I rules, as well as shifts in viewing habits toward cable networks and online video on demand services for cartoons and other youth-oriented content. The More You Know premiered two weeks later on October 8, 2016 (October 1 children's programming was pre-empted for NBC network coverage of the 2016 Ryder Cup). Programs in the block often air at alternate times (including weekdays) due to pre-emptions from NBC Sports, including golf coverage.

On January 6, 2018, Telemundo relaunched its MiTelemundo block—which had also been programmed by Sprout—with a new schedule consisting of Spanish dubs of The More You Know's programming.

== Programming ==
=== Current ===
Program	Premiere date	Replaced	References and Notes
Earth Odyssey with Dylan Dreyer	July 28, 2018	Journey; The Voyager	
Wild Child	January 2, 2021		
Mutual of Omaha's Wild Kingdom Protecting the Wild	October 7, 2023	Wild Child	
Forever Young with Dr. Pablo Prichard	October 4, 2025	Harlem Globetrotters: Play it Forward	
Tails of Valor	October 4, 2025	Harlem Globetrotters: Play it Forward	Originally aired on CBS WKND
The Great American Journey	August 22, 2026		

=== Former ===
Program	Premiere date	End date	Replaced	Replaced by	References
The Champion Within with Lauren Thompson	October 8, 2016	August 22, 2020	NBC Kids programming	One Team	
The Voyager with Josh Garcia	October 8, 2016	September 30, 2023	NBC Kids programming	Earth Odyssey	
Give	October 8, 2016	March 31, 2018	NBC Kids programming	Health + Happiness with Mayo Clinic	
Wilderness Vet with Dr. Oakley	October 8, 2016	May 26, 2018	NBC Kids programming		
Journey with Dylan Dreyer	October 8, 2016	July 21, 2018	NBC Kids programming	Earth Odyssey	
Naturally, Danny Seo	October 8, 2016	June 1, 2019	NBC Kids programming		
Health + Happiness with Mayo Clinic	April 7, 2018	August 4, 2018	Give		
Consumer 101	October 6, 2018	September 26, 2021			
Vets Saving Pets	October 6, 2018	September 24, 2022		Harlem Globetrotters: Play it Forward	Moved to Weekend Adventure on ABC.
Harlem Globetrotters: Play it Forward	October 1, 2022	September 27, 2025	Vets Saving Pets; One Team	Forever Young with Dr. Pablo Prichard; Tails of Valor	
A New Leaf	October 5, 2019	September 26, 2021			
One Team: The Power of Sports	August 29, 2020	September 30, 2023	The Champion Within		

== See also ==
- Children's programming on NBC
- Children's programming on Telemundo
