= Weekend Marketplace =

- Genre: Paid programming
- Country of origin: United States
- Original language: English

Production
- Running time: 120 minutes (four 30-minute infomercials)
- Production companies: Various; inventory sold by WorldLink

Original release
- Network: Fox
- Release: January 3, 2009 – June 19, 2014

Weekend Marketplace was a two-hour block of paid programming airing on Fox that debuted on January 3, 2009, replacing the 4Kids TV cartoon block due to the termination of the network's time lease agreement with 4Kids Entertainment. The block, which airs on Saturday mornings, is programmed solely with infomercials, which usually air on networks and broadcast television stations during late night and early morning timeslots; such programming, however, has not previously been scheduled on a regular basis by a major broadcast television network.

Beginning on September 13, 2014 in some markets, Weekend Marketplace can be substituted with the internally syndicated Xploration Station block produced by Steve Rotfeld Productions, which provides two hours of educational and informational programming for stations to count toward federally mandated programming requirements; Fox's owned-and-operated stations and Nexstar Media Group, along with several other affiliate groups and individual stations are currently carrying this block instead. Fox continues to offer Weekend Marketplace to stations which chose to purchase E/I programming off the open syndication market. Notably the Fox stations (and one CW station) of Sinclair Broadcast Group were under the latter arrangement until the fall of 2016, when Sinclair also began to carry Xploration Station, and one station within the Gray Television's portfolio (Fox affiliate WFLX). At least one Sinclair station (WUTV in Buffalo, New York) carries both, carrying Weekend Marketplace on Saturday mornings while splitting the Xploration Station block up and airing it as a weekday strip instead of as a block.

== Overview ==
=== Description ===
Despite being carried by Fox, the block contains no network branding or in-house promotional advertising, as it consists of infomercials with few commercial breaks. The title Weekend Marketplace is never mentioned at all on-air, and is used mainly as a placeholder title within television listings and industry media; most stations that carry the block list it as four separate half-hour segments as "paid programming" so that viewers are not misled about its content, and may also carry their own legal disclaimer at the beginning and end of each program over the advertiser's own disclaimer to further blur its origination. In addition, Fox stated that it ultimately intended to have the block contain programs that resemble normal programming (albeit still prominently advertising a product), though this never occurred. Presently the block consists of four traditional 28½-minute infomercials, with short-form direct response commercials airing at the end of each half-hour; no local station breaks are shown beyond the disclaimer space and a five-second station identification slot (to fulfill Federal Communications Commission rules) at the top of the first hour.

=== Scheduling ===
The block normally airs from 10:00 a.m. to Noon Eastern and Pacific Time, the second half of the timeslot previously used for 4Kids TV, the remaining two-hour time period occupied by the first half of the predecessor block was returned to the network's affiliates, for use to air syndicated, locally produced lifestyle brokered programming, or local weekend morning newscasts.

Since 2013, when Fox began to carry Fox College Football on Saturday mornings (and its coverage has expanded from that point until late night), the block's scheduling has become more erratic as local stations have begun to carry their own pre-game show programming before the games (and game coverage west of the Central Time Zone), along with late morning-early afternoon coverage of Fox College Hoops, with the block only airing across the network as of 2024 in the summertime when college sports are not taking place. Even then, many Fox affiliates with a news department have expanded their weekend morning newscasts further with the weekend syndicated programming market's decline or station group efforts to remove paid programming entirely.

In 2019, an 11 a.m. ET/8 a.m. PT pre-game show, Big Noon Kickoff, began to air on Fox, effectively pre-empting Weekend Marketplace from August until the end of the year, as the infomercials are not required to be made up elsewhere on the schedule by those affiliates carrying it due to the priority of scheduling E/I programming elsewhere on the weekends. BNK was expanded to two hours in 2020, now airing from 10 a.m. ET/7 a.m. PT.

=== Affiliate reach ===
With the expansion of Fox's Saturday sports schedule, the purposeful obfuscation of its listings by Fox stations, along with affiliates scheduling expanded news and alternate programming rather than Weekend Marketplace, the block's current known reach is unknown; however it previously aired until the 2014-15 season on 95% of Fox's stations, both owned-and-operated stations and affiliates. Most, if not all, of the stations that declined to carry 4Kids TV – such as Miami affiliate WSVN and Detroit owned-and-operated station WJBK – have similarly declined Weekend Marketplace (two of the exceptions are Cleveland affiliate WJW and O&O KTBC in Austin, which aired the infomercial block after having declined the network's children's block under its Fox Kids, Fox Box and 4Kids TV iterations for many years).

However, it does not appear that all of the non-Fox stations that picked up 4Kids TV in such markets have continued with the infomercial block (Detroit Independent station WMYD airs the block, while fellow independent stations, including KASW in Phoenix and WMLW-TV in Milwaukee and CW O&O WBNX-TV in Cleveland and CW affiliate WBFS-TV in Miami declined to carry it). It is unclear whether or not, since the infomercial buyers pay the network for national network reach on Weekend Marketplace, the Fox affiliates that refuse to carry the block have to compensate Fox and/or the infomercial buyers for the lack of broadcast coverage in that market, or in reverse, the buyers are discounted off the rates for non-carrying stations.

Sinclair-operated/Deerfield Media-owned KMYS in San Antonio, which switched from MyNetworkTV to The CW in September 2010, continues to carry the block in lieu of Fox-affiliated sister station KABB and instead airs The CW's brokered E/I block, One Magnificent Morning (programmed by Litton Entertainment), during overnight periods inaccessible to most children. Likewise, One Magnificent Morning's predecessor, Vortexx (programmed by Saban Brands, which acquired most of 4Kids's program library in 2012), was programmed in the same fashion prior to its closure by The CW in September 2014 (KMYS already carries three hours of E/I programming purchased from syndication, allowing it to meet the regulations). In both instances, this is likely because the station was unable to revoke the deal to carry Weekend Marketplace. In October 2021, KMYS's main-channel schedule moved to sister station WOAI-TV as a subchannel as part of Sinclair consolidating affiliations on directly owned stations, with KMYS-DT1 becoming an automated affiliate of Dabl. It continues to air in the same scheduling on WOAI-DT2.
