= Sea Rescue (TV program) =

- Genre: Educational
- Created by: Dave Morgan; Scott Helmstedter; Eric S. Rollman
- Presented by: Sam Champion; Matt Gutman; Jimmy Marlow
- Country of origin: United States
- Original language: English
- No. of seasons: 8
- No. of episodes: 169

Production
- Executive producers: Dave Morgan; Scott Helmstedter; Eric S. Rollman; Bryan Curb; David Doyle
- Producer: Susie Lewis
- Production locations: SeaWorld Orlando; SeaWorld San Diego
- Running time: 21 minutes
- Production companies: MTO Productions; Ampersand Media; SeaWorld Family Entertainment; Litton Entertainment

Original release
- Network: Syndication
- Release: April 7, 2012 – May 15, 2021

Related
- The Wildlife Docs

Sea Rescue is an American 30-minute reality television program which showcases documented stories of rescue, rehabilitation and return to the wild of marine animals by a team of dedicated vets, animal care experts, animal science researchers and government authorities. This program debuted on ABC on April 7, 2012. From 2014, Sea Rescue was hosted by Matt Gutman of ABC News, taking over from former ABC News personality Sam Champion who hosted the series until 2014. The program appears as part of the Litton's Weekend Adventure live-action kids and family series programming block on the ABC TV network on Saturday Mornings. In 2016, Sea Rescue was honored by the National Academy of Television Arts and Sciences with a Daytime Emmy for Outstanding Children's Series.

Production on the program ended on June 2, 2018. Reruns aired on ABC's Litton's Weekend Adventure until September 29, 2018. It was replaced by The Great Dr. Scott on October 6, 2018. Reruns of this series returned to ABC's Litton's Weekend Adventure on October 3, 2020.

On January 2, 2021, Sea Rescue has returned to TV with Jimmy Marlow taking over as host.
