= The Wildlife Docs =

American educational television program

- Genre: Educational television
- Created by: Scott Helmstedter; Eric S. Rollman
- Presented by: Rachel Reenstra
- Music by: Guy Erez; David Ari Leon
- Country of origin: United States
- Original language: English
- No. of seasons: 5
- No. of episodes: 126

Production
- Executive producers: Jeff Androsky; Scott Helmstedter; Dave Morgan; Eric S. Rollman; Carol Sherman
- Production locations: Busch Gardens Tampa; Tampa, Florida, U.S.A.
- Running time: 20–22 minutes
- Production companies: Natural 9 Entertainment; SeaWorld Family Entertainment; Litton Entertainment

Original release
- Network: ABC (2013–2018); The CW (2018–2019)
- Release: October 5, 2013 – June 2, 2018

Related
- Sea Rescue

The Wildlife Docs is an American educational television program hosted by Rachel Reenstra which documents the surprising, exotic, and challenging lives of a veterinary staff that care for over 12,000 animals at Busch Gardens in Tampa.

The show premiered on October 5, 2013 as part of the Litton's Weekend Adventure programming block on ABC.

This series is presented in conjunction between SeaWorld Parks & Entertainment and Litton Entertainment. It joined The CW's One Magnificent Morning block on October 6, 2018.
