= The Inspectors =

American crime drama television series

- Genre: Crime drama Educational television
- Created by: Dave Morgan
- Starring: Jessica Lundy; Bret Green; Terry Serpico; Harrison Knight; Erica-Marie Sanchez
- Country of origin: United States
- Original language: English
- No. of seasons: 4
- No. of episodes: 104

Production
- Executive producers: Dave Morgan; Peter Sniderman
- Producers: Bryan Curb; Rick Kellard; Grant Fitch; Kent Archer; Sebastian Mazzola; Russell Simpson
- Production location: Charleston, South Carolina
- Editor: DeWitt Patterson
- Production company: Litton Entertainment

Original release
- Network: CBS
- Release: October 3, 2015 – May 25, 2019

The Inspectors is an American crime drama television series, created by Dave Morgan and produced by Litton Entertainment. Centering on the criminal investigations of U.S. postal inspectors, it was the only show on commercial television paid for by a U.S. government agency, with its funding coming from the United States Postal Service asset forfeiture and consumer fraud awareness funds. The half-hour series ran from October 3, 2015, to May 25, 2019, and aired on Saturday mornings on CBS as part of the network's Dream Team Saturday morning three-hour block of children's programming.

== Premise ==
The series stars Jessica Lundy as a Postal Inspector who investigates crimes relating to U.S. Postal Service mail. The show also focuses on her personal life as a single mom with a son who became a paraplegic in the same crash that killed his father, also a postal inspector. At the end of each episode, Lundy and the Chief U.S. Postal Inspector, Guy Cottrell, give viewers tips on how to avoid being a victim of a scam similar to the episode.

== Cast ==
=== Main ===
- Jessica Lundy as Amanda Wainwright
- Bret Green as Preston Wainwright
- Terry Serpico as Mitch Ohlmeyer
- Harrison Knight as Noah Waldman
- Erica-Marie Sanchez as Veronica Ruiz

=== Recurring ===
- Carlos Bernard as Henry Wainwright
- Charmin Lee as Georgia Darby

=== Guest ===
- Dan Marino as himself

== Production and broadcast ==
The Inspectors was filmed largely in and around Charleston, South Carolina. The second season of the series premiered on October 1, 2016, and concluded on May 27, 2017. The series was renewed for a third season, which began on September 30, 2017. It reached the 100-episode milestone during its fourth and final season.

On September 4, 2019, Litton Entertainment announced the 2019 fall schedule for the CBS Dream Team block, revealing that The Inspectors had been dropped from the lineup. It was replaced by Mission Unstoppable, a new series hosted by Miranda Cosgrove. The series' cancellation was later confirmed through comment replies on Facebook.

== Episodes ==
=== Series overview ===
Season	Episodes	Originally released	
Season	Episodes	First released	Last released
1	26	October 3, 2015	June 11, 2016
2	26	October 1, 2016	May 27, 2017
3	26	September 30, 2017	May 26, 2018
4	26	September 29, 2018	May 25, 2019

=== Season 1 (2015–16) ===
No. overall	No. in season	Title	Original release date
1	1	"Pilot"	October 3, 2015
2	2	"Elephant in the Room"	October 10, 2015
3	3	"The Long Shot"	October 17, 2015
4	4	"Final Distraction"	October 24, 2015
5	5	"The Slow and the Furious"	October 31, 2015
6	6	"Semper Phi"	November 7, 2015
7	7	"The Heart Is a Lonely Scammer"	November 14, 2015
8	8	"We Take Care of Our Own"	November 21, 2015
9	9	"Threatening Letters"	January 16, 2016
10	10	"Arrivederci Milo's"	January 23, 2016
11	11	"Jersey Blues"	January 30, 2016
12	12	"Noah's Story Arc"	February 6, 2016
13	13	"Fast Tracking"	February 13, 2016
14	14	"Storm Chasers"	February 20, 2016
15	15	"30 Days"	February 27, 2016
16	16	"Too Good to Be True"	March 5, 2016
17	17	"Identity"	March 12, 2016
18	18	"The Imitation Games"	April 16, 2016
19	19	"The Great Pretenders"	April 23, 2016
20	20	"Gone Phishing"	April 30, 2016
21	21	"Psychic Rabbit"	May 7, 2016
22	22	"No Good Deed"	May 14, 2016
23	23	"Jamaican Lottery"	May 21, 2016
24	24	"More than a Feeling"	May 28, 2016
25	25	"Tussles and Threats"	June 4, 2016
26	26	"The Impostors"	June 11, 2016

=== Season 2 (2016–17) ===
No. overall	No. in season	Title	Original release date
27	1	"Veronica Returns"	October 1, 2016
28	2	"Casey Gets Pinned"	October 8, 2016
29	3	"Sweater for Phil"	October 15, 2016
30	4	"The Art of Stand-Up"	October 22, 2016
31	5	"The One That Got Away"	October 29, 2016
32	6	"The Great Postal Truck Robbery"	November 12, 2016
33	7	"Dangerous Delivery"	November 19, 2016
34	8	"The Return of Ronnie"	November 26, 2016
35	9	"Wedding Bell Blues"	January 14, 2017
36	10	"Faking It"	January 21, 2017
37	11	"Mistaken Identities"	January 28, 2017
38	12	"Man Overboard"	February 4, 2017
39	13	"The Bus Stops Here"	February 11, 2017
40	14	"Bribe and Prejudice"	February 18, 2017
41	15	"For Whom The Bell Tolls"	February 25, 2017
42	16	"Spring Break"	March 4, 2017
43	17	"Birds Eye View"	March 11, 2017
44	18	"It's a Wash"	April 1, 2017
45	19	"Trial by Error"	April 8, 2017
46	20	"Meds in the Mail"	April 15, 2017
47	21	"Failure to Render"	April 22, 2017
48	22	"A Friend You Know"	April 29, 2017
49	23	"Major Decisions"	May 6, 2017
50	24	"It's Complicated"	May 13, 2017
51	25	"Stolen Identities"	May 20, 2017
52	26	"Inspectors: Undercover"	May 27, 2017

=== Season 3 (2017–18) ===
No. overall	No. in season	Title	Original release date
53	1	"Welcome Back"	September 30, 2017
54	2	"Teacher's Pet"	October 7, 2017
55	3	"Hospital Hack"	October 14, 2017
56	4	"Surveillance 101"	October 21, 2017
57	5	"The Initiation"	October 28, 2017
58	6	"Meet Sam"	November 4, 2017
59	7	"Grandpa's Gumbo"	November 11, 2017
60	8	"The Christmas Special"	November 18, 2017
61	9	"Mitch Knows Best"	January 13, 2018
62	10	"The Henry Wainwright Foundation"	January 20, 2018
63	11	"That Moment When..."	January 27, 2018
64	12	"Curtain Call"	February 3, 2018
65	13	"Jamai-Can"	February 10, 2018
66	14	"Noah's Near Miss"	February 17, 2018
67	15	"Window Washers"	February 24, 2018
68	16	"All About V"	March 3, 2018
69	17	"Cat in a Coal Mine"	March 10, 2018
70	18	"Stop the Presses"	March 31, 2018
71	19	"Witness Intimidation"	April 7, 2018
72	20	"Counterfeit Culture"	April 14, 2018
73	21	"Internet Connections"	April 21, 2018
74	22	"Blast Off"	April 28, 2018
75	23	"Family Reunion: Part One"	May 5, 2018
76	24	"Family Reunion: Part Two"	May 12, 2018
77	25	"Foreign Lottery Scams and Their Victims"	May 19, 2018
78	26	"Hazardous Epidemic"	May 26, 2018

=== Season 4 (2018–19) ===
No. overall	No. in season	Title	Original release date
79	1	"Ren Is the New Black"	September 29, 2018
80	2	"Diagnosis: Negative"	October 6, 2018
81	3	"The Dog House"	October 13, 2018
82	4	"Scam School"	October 20, 2018
83	5	"Shields and Potions"	October 27, 2018
84	6	"What's in a Name?"	November 10, 2018
85	7	"Smells Like Christmas Spirit"	November 17, 2018
86	8	"Smile Like You Mean It"	January 5, 2019
87	9	"Blank Canvas...of Corruption"	January 12, 2019
88	10	"Turtle Trouble Beach Party"	January 19, 2019
89	11	"Mother Nature"	January 26, 2019
90	12	"Hurtful Words"	February 2, 2019
91	13	"Senior Week"	February 9, 2019
92	14	"Diner Dash"	February 16, 2019
93	15	"Sticker Shock"	February 23, 2019
94	16	"Making Chemistry"	March 2, 2019
95	17	"Moving Still"	March 23, 2019
96	18	"School's in Session"	March 30, 2019
97	19	"And the Winner is..."	April 6, 2019
98	20	"Kickin It"	April 13, 2019
99	21	"Lost Angeles"	April 20, 2019
100	22	"Flyers 'n Resumes"	April 27, 2019
101	23	"My Father's Footsteps"	May 4, 2019
102	24	"One Step at a Time"	May 11, 2019
103	25	"The Name Game"	May 18, 2019
104	26	"Stick to the Script"	May 25, 2019

== Reception ==
The Inspectors was the subject of the final segment of the November 5, 2017 episode of Last Week Tonight with John Oliver. In the segment, Oliver criticized the show's writing as well as its approach to the subject matter and target demographic, but noted the importance of what the postal service was trying to do.

== Awards and nominations ==
The Inspectors was nominated for six Daytime Emmy Awards for the 2015–16 season, winning one, and two Daytime Emmy Awards for the 2018–2019 season, also winning one.
