= Weekend Adventure =

Saturday morning educational program block syndicated to ABC stations

- Network: syndicated to ABC owned-and-operated stations and affiliates American Forces Network
- Launched: September 3, 2011; 15 years ago
- Country of origin: United States
- Owner: Hearst Media Production Group
- Formerly known as: ABC Weekend Adventure (pre-launch); Litton's Weekend Adventure (2011–22)
- Format: Saturday morning educational program block
- Running time: 3 hours
- Original language: English

Weekend Adventure (originally known as ABC Weekend Adventure and Litton's Weekend Adventure) is an American syndicated programming block that is produced by Hearst Media Production Group, and airs weekend mornings on the owned-and-operated stations and affiliates of ABC. The block features live-action documentary and lifestyle series aimed at a family audience that meet educational programming requirements defined by the Children's Television Act. Announced on May 24, 2011, Litton's Weekend Adventure premiered on September 3, 2011, replacing the ABC Kids block, and the first block to air in high definition since its debut.

The block is syndicated to ABC stations directly rather than being part of the network's official schedule. This was the result of a compromise between the network and its stations after ABC management decided in 2010 that it no longer wanted to provide educational programming. Thus, Weekend Adventure does not contain any ABC branding or promotions, and likewise is not promoted directly by ABC on-air or mentioned on the network's website.

== Background ==
The block came as a result of ABC's decision in March 2010 to no longer provide E/I programming as part of its Saturday morning network lineup to its affiliates; the network had not introduced any new E/I programs for its ABC Kids block since 2007, and those that had been airing on the network at the time of the decision consisted of reruns of Disney Channel sitcoms that had first aired on the block between September 2005 and May 2007, all of which were out of production by the time ABC Kids ended its run. In addition, before Haim Saban and Saban Brands repurchased the rights to the Power Rangers franchise from The Walt Disney Company in 2010, several station groups that owned ABC affiliates (such as Hearst Television, which would later acquire a majority stake in Litton Entertainment in 2017 and Allbritton Communications) refused to carry any series from that franchise (or any other non-E/I-compliant shows within the block such as Kim Possible) or chose to run them only in low-rated early morning timeslots, and had demanded any lineup be fully educational so the stations would not have to purchase E/I programming from syndication distributors.

Most of the major commercial networks began restructuring their Saturday morning children's program blocks (with Fox dropping theirs outright) to comply to tightened educational content and advertising regulations in the Children's Television Act; cultural shifts and changes in viewing habits through the migration of younger viewers to cable channels, recordable and streaming media were also affecting viewership of children's lineups carried by broadcast television networks.

As a compromise, the network's affiliate board agreed to instead look for a syndication package that would air exclusively on ABC owned-and-operated and affiliate stations. Litton Entertainment was eventually selected by the ABC affiliate board to program the block, beating out two other competitors as a part of the winning presentation in which Litton suggested counterprogramming the then-usual Saturday morning fare by featuring unscripted and "pro-social programming" aimed at children and teenagers ages 7–17.

== History ==
ABC and Litton Entertainment announced the block on May 24, 2011, for a fall 2011 launch, under the working title "ABC Weekend Adventure." ABC initially signed deals with its owned-and-operated station group ABC Owned Television Stations, as well as affiliates owned by Cox Broadcasting, The McGraw-Hill Companies, Newport Television, and Post-Newsweek Stations to carry the block; these were followed by May 2011 with distribution agreements involving ABC stations owned by Belo, Bonten Media Group, Chambers Communications Corporation, Fisher Communications, Gannett Company, Hubbard Broadcasting, The E. W. Scripps Company, LIN TV Corporation, News-Press & Gazette Company, Young Broadcasting, and Weigel Broadcasting.

The renamed Litton's Weekend Adventure launched on September 3, 2011, with six series: Jack Hanna's Wild Countdown, Ocean Mysteries with Jeff Corwin, Born to Explore with Richard Wiese, Culture Click, Everyday Health, and Food for Thought with Claire Thomas (originally titled The Delicious Adventures of Claire Thomas prior to its debut). Two other series were also initially announced to be in development: the environment-focused Agents of Change (from producer Mark Koops) and Earth: Angry Planet; however, neither show was picked up to series. On May 2, 2012, ABC and Litton reached an agreement to broadcast Weekend Adventure worldwide on the American Forces Network, beginning that June.

On September 24, 2012, Litton announced that a television version of Everyday Health's YouTube series Recipe Rehab (one of several web series directly funded by the video sharing website as a part of a premium content initiative) would premiere on the block beginning on October 6, 2012 replacing the Everyday Health series.

On September 28, 2013, Litton launched a competing Saturday morning block for CBS, the CBS Dream Team (which replaced the Cookie Jar TV block). The following week on October 5, 2013, the Weekend Adventure block's "Health and Wellness Hour" (consisting of health and culinary programs that filled the third hour of the block) was retired as part of a refocusing towards exclusively wildlife-focused programs, with the move, Recipe Rehab migrated to CBS's Dream Team block.

Subsequently, on October 4, 2014, Expedition Wild moved from Weekend Adventure to another Saturday morning block produced by Litton that launched on that date, One Magnificent Morning on The CW.

In 2016, two stations disaffiliated from ABC due to varied issues; WKPT-TV in the Tri-Cities region of Tennessee and Virginia, and WSVI in the U.S. Virgin Islands, but as the Litton syndication contract for Weekend Adventure is separate from their expired ABC affiliation agreements, were able to continue to air Weekend Adventure for the time being. The new Tri-Cities ABC affiliate, WJHL-DT2, used programming from the Fox-associated Xploration Station block (which was turned down by WEMT) and other syndicated programming for their E/I contributions instead. In April 2017, Weekend Adventure moved to WJHL-DT2 after WKPT voided all of their syndication contracts to become a full-time carrier of Cozi TV. The same circumstances currently exist for WPLG in Miami, which continues to carry the block after ABC's departure to WSVN-DT2/WDFL-LD in August 2025, and KDNL-TV in St. Louis, whose affiliation contract ended on September 1, 2026, with KMOV-DT2 becoming that market's ABC affiliate.

== Programming ==
Programs featured on Litton's Weekend Adventure are designed to meet federally mandated educational programming guidelines, allowing ABC stations to comply with the three-hour weekly minimum for E/I content defined by the Federal Communications Commission. However, some ABC stations may carry syndicated educational programs to provide additional E/I content supplementary to the block. Programs aired within the block may be deferred to Sunday daytime slots, or (in the case of affiliates in the Western United States) Saturday afternoons due to breaking news or severe weather coverage or, more commonly, regional or select national sports broadcasts (especially in the case of college football tournaments) scheduled in earlier Saturday timeslots as makegoods to comply with the E/I regulations. Some stations may air the entirety of the Weekend Adventure block on tape delay to accommodate local news or other programs of local interest (such as public affairs shows, real estate or lifestyle programs).

=== Current programming ===
Program	Premiere date	Replaced	Notes	References
Hearts of Heroes	January 5, 2019		Hosted by Belfor CEO Sheldon Yellen and Brooke Shields. Previously co-hosted with Ginger Zee	
Wildlife Nation with Jeff Corwin	October 2, 2021	Sea Rescue; Ocean Treks	Partnered with Defenders of Wildlife	
Jack Hanna's Passport	April 6, 2024	Vets Saving Pets	Hosted by Alfonso Ribeiro	
Donkey King	January 3, 2026			
Home for Good	April 4, 2026	Oh Baby!	Hosted by Art Edmonds	
The Champion's Edge with Bonnie Bernstein	May 9, 2026			

=== Former programming ===
Program	Premiere date	End date	Replaced	Replaced by	Notes	Reference
Jack Hanna's Wild Countdown	September 3, 2011	September 26, 2020	ABC Kids programming	Outback Adventures	Longest running program on the block, flagship series Replaced by Outback Adventures in 2020, which came back after 3 years	
Born to Explore with Richard Wiese	September 3, 2011	September 24, 2016	ABC Kids programming	Ocean Treks		
Culture Click	September 3, 2011	February 11, 2012	ABC Kids programming		Pop culture/satirical series, hosted by Nzinga Blake	
Everyday Health	September 3, 2011	September 29, 2012	ABC Kids programming	Recipe Rehab	Lifestyle series, hosted by Laila Ali, Jenna Morasca and Ethan Zohn	
Food for Thought with Claire Thomas	September 3, 2011	September 28, 2013	ABC Kids programming	The Wildlife Docs	Cooking series, produced by Basil Street media Reruns later aired on Laff	
Ocean Mysteries with Jeff Corwin	September 3, 2011	September 24, 2016	ABC Kids programming	Ocean Treks	Reruns air on The CW's One Magnificent Morning and Syndication	
Sea Rescue	April 7, 2012	September 25, 2021		Wildlife Nation		
Recipe Rehab	October 6, 2012	September 28, 2013	Everyday Health	Expedition Wild	Aired on the CBS Dream Team from 2013 to 2015 and again since 2023	
Expedition Wild	October 5, 2013	September 27, 2014	Recipe Rehab	Outback Adventures	Wildlife series, hosted by Casey Anderson; Originally aired on Nat Geo Wild from 2010 to 2011, and then revived for the Weekend Adventure block, and then moved to One Magnificent Morning from 2014 to 2015	
The Wildlife Docs	October 5, 2013	June 2, 2018	Food For Thought	The Great Dr. Scott	Moved to One Magnificent Morning	
Outback Adventures with Tim Faulkner	October 4, 2014	September 30, 2017	Jack Hanna's Wild Countdown			
Rock the Park	October 3, 2015	March 27, 2021		Free Enterprise	Originally part of One Magnificent Morning.	
Ocean Treks with Jeff Corwin	October 1, 2016	September 25, 2021	Born to ExploreOcean Mysteries	Wildlife Nation		
Vacation Creation	October 7, 2017	September 28, 2019	Outback Adventures	Oh Baby!	Previously aired on The CW's One Magnificent Morning from 2016 to 2017	
The Great Dr. Scott	October 6, 2018	September 28, 2019			Reruns air on syndication	
Oh Baby!	October 5, 2019	March 28, 2026	The Great Dr. Scott; Vacation Creation	Home for Good	hosted by Janai Norman	
Free Enterprise	April 3, 2021	September 30, 2023	Rock The Park			
Vets Saving Pets	October 1, 2022	March 30, 2024		Jack Hanna's Passport	Originally aired on NBC after a 2-year hiatus	

== Awards and nominations ==
In 2014, Ocean Mysteries with Jeff Corwin won two Creative Arts Daytime Emmy Awards for "Outstanding Travel Program".

== See also ==
- Children's Programming on the American Broadcasting Company
