= Regulations on children's television programming in the United States =

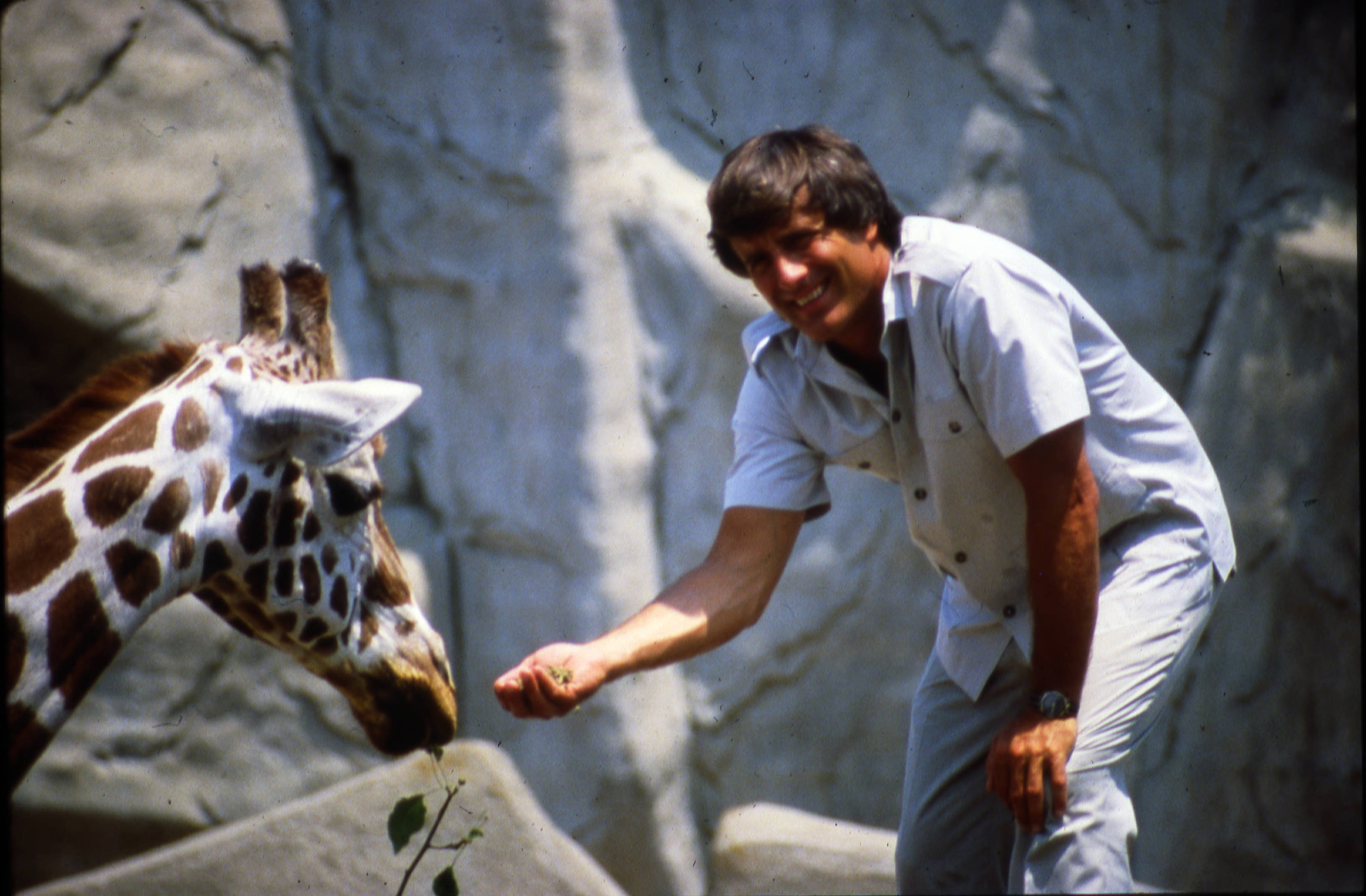
Zookeeper Jack Hanna has been widely associated with Hearst Media Production Group (formerly Litton Entertainment), a prominent distributor of children's educational programming.

The broadcast of educational children's programming by terrestrial television stations in the United States is mandated by the Federal Communications Commission (FCC), under regulations colloquially referred to as the Children's Television Act (CTA), the E/I rules, or the Kid Vid rules. Since 1997, all full-power and Class A low-power broadcast television stations have been required to broadcast at least three hours (or more if they operate digital subchannels) per-week of programs that are specifically designed to meet the educational and informative (E/I) needs of children aged 16 and younger. There are also regulations on advertising in television programs targeting children 12 and younger, which are enforced by the FCC for broadcast television and the Federal Trade Commission (FTC) for cable television.

Early regulations on educational programming were implemented by the FCC in 1991, as ordered by the Children's Television Act—an Act of Congress passed in 1990. They included a requirement for television stations to publish reports on their efforts to carry programming that "furthers the positive development of children 16 years of age and under in any respect, including the child's intellectual/cognitive or social/emotional needs", and for the FCC to use these reports as a factor in license renewals. The Act also imposed limits on advertising during television programming targeting viewers 12 and younger, including limits on how many minutes of commercials may be aired per-hour, and prohibiting commercials that are related to the program currently airing. The FCC adopted a stronger regulation known as the Children's Programming Report and Order in 1996, which took effect in 1997: it requires all television stations to broadcast at least three hours of programming per-week that is specifically designed to educate and inform viewers aged 16 and younger, requires on-air identification of these programs, and has more stringent reporting requirements.

The regulations had a major impact on American television; there was an increased demand for compliant educational programming on the syndication market, while the Saturday-morning blocks traditionally aired by major networks began to increase their focus on educational programming. This factor, however, alongside the growth of platforms not subject to the regulations—such as children's cable channels and, later, internet video and streaming services—contributed to an overall decline in broadcast television airings of non-educational children's programming (such as cartoons). In the 2010s, the major networks gradually shifted to using factual, reality-style programs declared as targeting teenagers to fulfill their E/I obligations, since they are not subject to the same restrictions on advertising as programs targeting children 12 and under. ABC, CBS, NBC, The CW and Telemundo all entered into agreements with Hearst Media Production Group (formerly Litton Entertainment) to program their E/I blocks, while Fox reached a similar agreement with Steve Rotfeld Productions.

The educational programming regulations have faced a mixed reception from the industry. There have historically been concerns over whether these mandates constitute a violation of broadcasters' rights to free speech. The FCC's initial regulations faced criticism for being too broad in its definition of children's educational programming, with stations attempting to classify various non-educational programs as containing educational elements. The amount of network television programming considered "highly educational" decreased after the implementation of the CTA, with the allowance for programming dealing with social issues (as opposed to programming dealing in traditional academic subjects) having been cited as a factor. The regulations were described by then-FCC commissioner Michael O'Rielly as "onerous" and outdated due to the cable and new media platforms that have emerged since their introduction, which led to changes in 2019 to provide more flexibility in compliance.

== Background ==
Concern over the impact that television had on children began when it was still a new entertainment medium. During the 1950s, many individuals, particularly parents, asked their legislators to do something about the potential effects of television viewing on young people. Academic research was subsequently initiated to monitor, analyze and explain the relationships between television and children, although the impact of television on academic performance continues to be debated in scholarly research. The first attempt to address these concerns were during Congressional hearings in 1952 that addressed violence. Besides Congress, there were government commissions that also pursued this agenda. Included in these discussions were the Federal Communications Commission (FCC), the Federal Trade Commission, and advocacy groups formed by concerned citizens. The FCC intended to change a number of policies regarding children's programming.

Research demonstrated that young children had difficulty distinguishing between the program they were watching, and commercials broadcast during them. Most children had little or no understanding of the persuasive intent of commercials, and as such, were highly vulnerable to claims and appeals by advertisers. Advertisers, especially those related to junk food, were interested in youth as consumers because of their spending power through their parents, their influence, and their brand awareness as adult consumers in the future.

== History ==
Newton Minow was one of the first federal officials to speak of the need for regulation of children's programming, openly denouncing cartoons as being unfit for the airwaves in his 1961 landmark speech "Television and the Public Interest". He did not take any direct action because he believed that improvements could be made without force and could be resolved by increasing competition through UHF television and expanding non-commercial educational options.

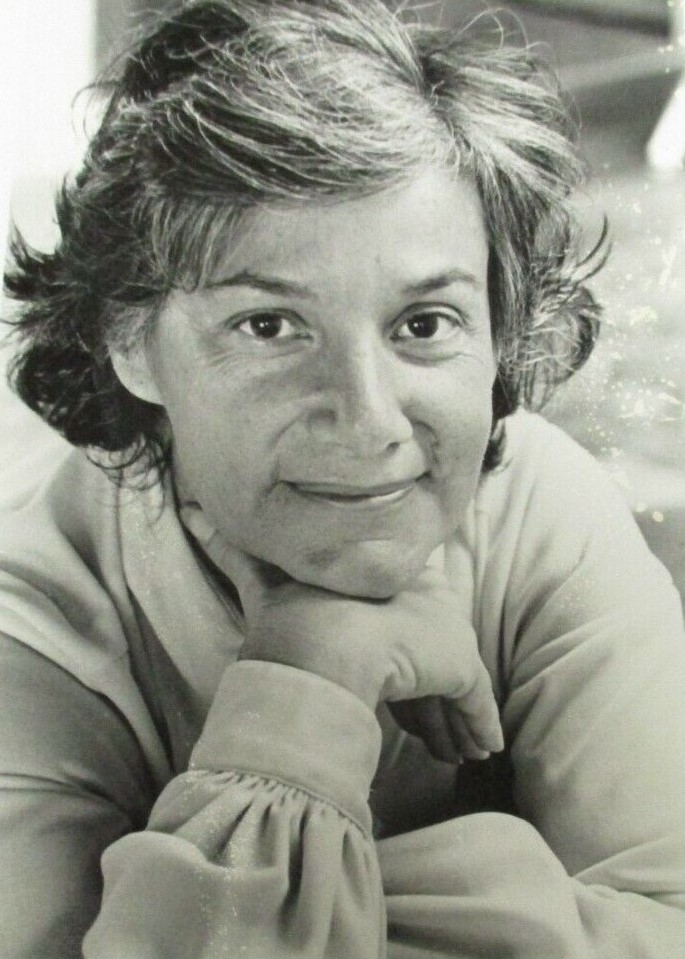
Peggy Charren was a well-known advocate for the broadcast of children's educational programming on American television.

In 1968, activist Peggy Charren established Action for Children's Television (ACT)—a lobbying group that campaigned for high-quality children's programming to be broadcast by television stations. ACT believed that the broadcasting of educational programming was part of broadcasters' obligations to serve the public interest, as required by their broadcast license. In the early 1970s, ACT successfully pressured the major networks to remove "violent" superhero cartoons from their children's programming, and in 1971, first proposed restrictions on airing any advertising during children's programs.

Fred Rogers testified before the Senate Subcommittee on Communications, chaired by John Pastore, on May 1, 1969.

In 1969, television host Fred Rogers testified before the U.S. Senate Subcommittee on Communications during hearings over proposed funding cuts to public broadcasting. At a time when President Richard Nixon sought to reduce funding from $20 million to $10 million, Rogers advocated for the educational and emotional value of non-commercial children's television. His testimony was widely broadcast, and has been described as one of the most powerful congressional presentations. According to media scholars, it contributed to the successful effort to secure increased funding for the Public Broadcasting Service (PBS), which rose to $22 million. Rogers' appearance highlighted growing federal interest in supporting children's educational programming through public media infrastructure.

In the early 1980s, ACT criticized the major networks for their decreasing commitments to educational programming, citing the cancellations of ABC's Animals, Animals, Animals and CBS's children's news magazine 30 Minutes as examples. It also criticized the networks for airing cartoons that they considered to be promotional vehicles for associated toylines rather than bona fide entertainment, such as He-Man and the Masters of the Universe, My Little Pony, and The Transformers.

In 1982, Reagan administration FCC chairman Mark S. Fowler lamented upon CBS's decision to move its long-running children's series Captain Kangaroo from its historic weekday morning timeslot, to weekends, in order to accommodate an expanded morning newscast. CBS had already shortened the program from a full hour to 30 minutes in 1981 for the same reason. At the time, the big three networks scheduled the majority of their children's programming—including cartoons—during their Saturday morning lineups. They also aired occasional "after school specials"—anthologies of television films focusing on issues affecting youth—in late-afternoon timeslots. Captain Kangaroo had to compete not only with news-based morning shows such as ABC's Good Morning America and NBC's Today, but local and syndicated offerings also targeting children.

Fowler was against mandating the broadcast of educational programming by commercial stations, arguing that it was within their First Amendment rights to choose the programming they wish to broadcast, and adding that "it's too bad Captain Kangaroo is gone, but the Government should not be issuing directives about what should be on the air." Instead, he proposed that commercial broadcasters be required to make annual contributions to a development fund for educational programming on public television.

His proposal faced criticism from the major networks: ABC's president of children's programming Squire D. Rushnell argued that commercial broadcasters were doing a better job at serving children than public broadcasters, while NBC vice president Betty Hudson criticized the proposal as a "tax" on commercial broadcasting. Captain Kangaroo creator and host Bob Keeshan disagreed, arguing that children were "just too important to be left to the networks and their profit motives." Citing the recent New York v. Ferber decision, he told The New York Times that "despite the guarantee of free speech, our children are so precious that the free speech of the [child] pornographer had to give way to allow us to protect children from exploitation."

=== Children's Television Act ===
Children's Television Act
- Other short titles: Children's Television Act of 1990
- Long title: An act to require the Federal Communications Commission to reinstate restrictions on advertising during children's television, to enforce the obligation of broadcasters to meet the educational and informational needs of the child audience, and for other purposes.
- Enacted by: the 101st United States Congress

Citations
- Public law: Pub. L. 101–437

Legislative history
- Introduced in the House as H.R. 1677 by John Bryant (D-TX) on April 5, 1989; Passed the House on July 23, 1989 (Voice vote); Passed the Senate on September 24, 1990 (Voice vote) with amendment; House agreed to Senate amendment on October 1, 1990 (Voice vote); Left unsigned by President George H. W. Bush and became law on October 17, 1990

In October 1990, the Children's Television Act (CTA) was enacted into law. This Act of Congress ordered the FCC to implement regulations surrounding programming that serves the "educational and informational" (E/I) needs of children, as well as the amount of advertising broadcast during television programs aimed towards children. This included that a station's commitment to airing and supporting educational children's programming had to become a factor in license renewals, and that limits had to be imposed on the amount of advertising that could be aired during television programs targeting children.

The CTA also called for the Secretary of Education to establish an endowment "for the purpose of creating and producing television programming specifically directed toward the development in children of fundamental intellectual skills". The fund received an initial allocation of $6 million over two years, with $2 million for fiscal year 1991 and $4 million for 1992. Programs that received funding from the endowment were required to premiere on public television. They could then be syndicated to commercial stations, provided that they were broadcast without advertising.

The FCC implemented the CTA via new regulations that came into effect on October 1, 1991. Television stations and cable providers were required to maintain and publish summaries of the children's educational programming that they broadcast, defined as "programming that furthers the positive development of children 16 years of age and under in any respect, including the child's intellectual/cognitive or social/emotional needs".

Commercial time during children's programming was capped at 12 minutes per hour on weekdays and 10.5 on weekends. The broadcasting of commercials for products associated with the program currently airing ("program-length commercials"), or otherwise containing talent or identifiable characteristics from the program ("host-selling") was prohibited. The prohibition of "host-selling" was intended to prevent children's programs that were tie-ins with toy franchises (such as, for example, G.I. Joe) from airing ads for the toys themselves during their associated programs. When airing children's programming, broadcasters were also encouraged to establish a clear separation between the program and advertising content so that younger viewers were able to distinguish between them.

The CTA was passed despite objections by the Bush administration, who believed that requiring the broadcast of educational programming by all television stations was a violation of their rights to free speech. The restriction on "program-length commercials" was also considered to be too narrow; critics (such as Charren) had demanded that it apply to any program targeted towards children that was primarily designed to promote products associated with them, rather than only applying if advertising for said products were broadcast during the program. PBS programming chief Jennifer Lawson believed that the endowment would "provide leadership, focus, and direction for children's educational television", but that the amount of money allocated for it "doesn't go a long way". Keeshan was critical of the requirement that commercial stations not carry advertising during programs funded by the endowment, and suggested that part of the funding allotment could be used to fund the publication of parents' guides for children's television.

=== 1996 regulations ===
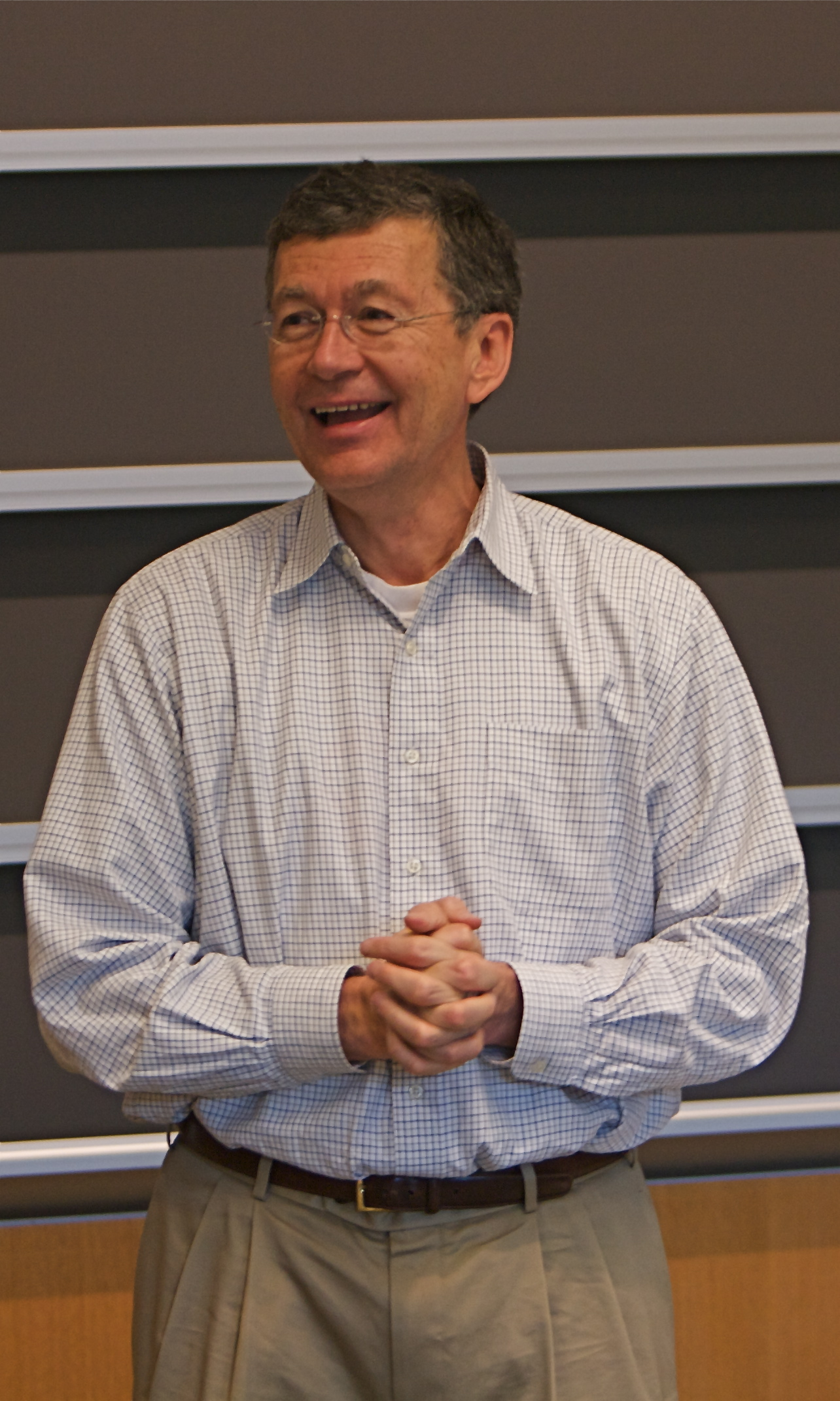
Reed Hundt in 2008

The 1991 regulations were considered ineffective; educational programs were often scheduled in off-peak time slots when children were unlikely to be watching, such as the early-morning or late-night hours, or in weekend afternoon time slots subject to preemption. Many stations failed to keep the required records or had any method for accurate recording. More than 25% of television stations in the U.S. failed to record the time, date, or length of programming considered to be educational in content. The FCC did little to regulate these logs up until 1993, but later on, came up with certain rules and regulations such as the safe harbor provision in order to regulate content for younger audiences.

Stations often relied on programs classified as promoting social/emotional development, to the point that some broadcasters declared general-interest programs not specifically designed to be educational—such as The Flintstones, G.I. Joe, Hard Copy, The Jetsons, Leave It to Beaver, and The Phil Donahue Show—as being educational programs, based on their discussion of social and/or moral issues. At least one station claimed that the Christmas special Santa Claus Is Comin' to Town was educational, based on its discussions of "mysteries, myths, and questions surrounding the legend of Santa Claus".

In 1995, then-FCC commissioner Reed Hundt began campaigning for stricter children's educational programming regulations, arguing that broadcasters were not displaying a sufficient commitment to the 1990 regulations. His proposal included that stations be required to air a minimum of three hours of children's educational programming per-week. Jeff Bingaman issued a letter of support for the proposal, signed by 24 Democratic senators and one Republican.

Fox Kids president Margaret Loesch disagreed with Hundt's belief that broadcasters were not following the rules, stating that most Fox affiliates already aired an average of four hours of children's educational programming per-week. Edward O. Fritts, president of the National Association of Broadcasters, accused Hundt of being "obsessed" with the proposed quota. In regards to reports that Hundt was struggling to receive FCC majority support for the proposal and was repeatedly "stalling" a final vote, Fritts stated that Hundt was "acting like a regulatory referee wanting to push the game into overtime even though the final score is lopsided.", and that he "made up his mind long ago that broadcasters were to be castigated on children's TV, without reservation, and despite overwhelming evidence to the contrary."

Following a push for support from Congress and the Clinton administration, the FCC adopted the Children's Programming Report and Order in August 1996. The new regulations were intended to provide clearer regulatory obligations for television stations, and promote public awareness of educational programming offered by television stations. The order and regulations defined core educational programming: a regularly scheduled program, of at least 30 minutes in length, that is "specifically designed" to meet the educational and informative needs of children 16 years old and younger. The FCC ordered that by September 1997, all commercial television stations must broadcast at least three hours of core educational programming per-week, regularly scheduled between the hours of 7 a.m. and 10 p.m. Beginning on January 2, 1997, television stations were required to use the branding "E/I" to promote these programs on-air and in programming information supplied to TV listings providers.

Commercial stations are also required to compile, publish, and publicize a quarterly Children's Television Programming Report in their public file, detailing the children's educational programming aired during the past quarter, what programs it plans to air during the next, and providing a point of contact for viewer inquiries about the educational programs aired by a station. As they are not under the jurisdiction of the FCC, this regulation does not apply to cable channels.

While non-commercial educational stations are also required to comply with the regulations, they are not subject to its monitoring and reporting rules.

=== 2006 changes ===
An example E/I "bug", which must be displayed on-screen during core educational programming.

In November 2004, the FCC announced revisions to the regulations to account for the then-upcoming digital television transition. An additional half-hour of E/I programming must be broadcast for every increment of 28 hours of additional free video programming the station offers via digital subchannels. The regulations also stipulate that an "E/I" logo must be displayed on-screen throughout such a program, that a regularly scheduled E/I program may only be rescheduled 10% of the time, and that if rescheduled or moved to a different multicast channel, the station must announce the new scheduling on-air. The logo requirement took effect in August 2005, following approval of the Office of Management and Budget.

The FCC also instituted new rules for promoting websites during programs targeting children 12 and younger: they must offer "a substantial amount of bona fide program-related or other noncommercial content", and not contain any commercial or e-commerce content. Pages containing imagery of characters from the program must also be "sufficiently separated" from commercial areas of the site. The rule would be enforceable by the FCC for broadcast TV, and the Federal Trade Commission (FTC) for cable.

The implementation of the advertising rules were deferred from February 2005 to January 2006, following concerns by broadcasters over the amount of time given to become compliant. Disney, NBC Universal, and Viacom issued a joint filing to the FCC in September 2005 to urge against the "far-reaching, burdensome and expensive" advertising rules, with Disney also suing over the regulations as being a violation of freedom of speech. On December 16, 2005, the FCC chose to delay the new regulation to March 6, 2006, in order to allow time for further discussion. They were implemented in September 2006.

=== 2019 changes ===
By the end of the 2010s, FCC commissioner Michael O'Rielly considered the educational programming regulations to be outdated. Citing the wider variety of platforms available (including cable networks and digital platforms), he stated that "with today's dynamic media marketplace there are very little, if any, additional benefits provided by the Kid Vid rules". O'Rielly also argued that the "onerous" nature of the regulations were also making stations reluctant to air other, more viable programs on Saturday mornings, such as newscasts and sports.

In July 2018, the FCC issued proposals regarding changes to the rules, including removing the requirement that a program must be regularly scheduled and at least 30 minutes in length, providing the option for all of a station's E/I programming to air on a subchannel rather than the main signal, allowing stations to organize or sponsor "non-broadcast" initiatives in lieu of airing educational programming, and replacing the quarterly report with an annual report. O'Rielly felt that the 30-minute minimum length "killed off shorter, high-quality programs that were once popular and educational", and does not reflect current viewing habits.

A group in favor of maintaining the existing policies, which included the Benton Foundation, Campaign for a Commercial-Free Childhood, and Common Sense Kids Action, among others, issued a letter of opposition to the FCC. They disagreed with O'Rielly's assessment that non-broadcast platforms "provide significant educational programming for children", and argued that broadcast television was still widely viewed by children, and that not all families have access to non-broadcast media.

On June 19, 2019, the FCC issued its proposed rule changes: while the basic minimum would remain intact, the earliest time allowed for E/I programming was moved up to 6 a.m. local time. Furthermore, a limited amount of public service announcements and short-form programming would be allowed to count as E/I, and stations would be allowed to schedule up to a third of the required programming on its digital subchannels. As a consequence of the latter aspect of the rule changes, the requirement to place E/I programming on every subchannel would be removed. Enforcement of the subchannel compliance with the E/I rules had resulted in incongruency of the required programming with the formats of many subchannels, particularly with the rise of niche multicast networks that rely on a specific genre of programming (e.g., classic television, movies, etc.) or focus on news, weather or sports (whether nationally distributed or locally originated) as few subchannel services target a general audience or children. The rules were officially approved on July 10, and went into effect on September 16.

== Effects on programming ==
Following the initial implementation of the regulations, many television stations began to cut locally produced children's programs due to budgetary concerns, and largely replaced them with educational programs acquired from the syndication market. Distributors such as Litton Entertainment benefited from the resulting demand.

The Annenberg Foundation found that the number of network television shows deemed to be "highly educational" from 1990 to 1998 fell from 43% to 29%. A research report from Georgetown University stated that one issue contributing to this was that what constituted "educational television" programming was defined too broadly, as programming that was only academic or that covered pro-social issues, for example, counted towards station requirements. Another issue was that traditional ideas of what should be taught to children, such as the alphabet or number systems, were lost.

There was also a reported increase in the number of programs focusing on social issues. Writers for these programs wrote stories that often were not academically sound for young viewers, because they were not trained in writing for this audience. Some shows were an exception to this rule; The Magic School Bus combined effective writing and educational content for children, while Bill Nye the Science Guy leveraged host Bill Nye's experience in sketch comedy to entertain and inform the audience. Studies commissioned by its distributor KCTS-TV found that children who watched Bill Nye were more likely to say that they enjoy science.

Networks picked up series more often when they were related to a well-known pop culture icon, or could be marketable as toys. Owing to the success of PBS's Barney & Friends from both a critical and commercial standpoint, Disney and Nickelodeon had a greater interest in producing preschool programming that was engaging and had educational value. However, they also leveraged techniques designed to bolster the programs as a brand when merchandised, such as close-up "money shots" of key characters designed to encourage recognition of them by viewers.

=== Saturday morning blocks ===
In the wake of the stricter regulations, the big three television networks retooled their Saturday morning lineups for the 1997–98 television season in order to include E/I-compliant programs.

ABC, which had recently been acquired by Disney, introduced One Saturday Morning for the 1997–98 season. It featured a mix of Disney animated series, educational interstitial segments (including a history-oriented segment starring comedian Robin Williams, reprising his voice role as the Genie from the film Aladdin), the educational series Science Court, and a flagship wraparound program (Disney's One Saturday Morning). ABC stated that four of the block's five hours would be billed as E/I programming. One Saturday Morning quickly became the top Saturday morning block in terms of viewership, until competition from Fox Kids and Kids' WB began to erode its audience.

CBS relaunched its Saturday morning block for the 1997–98 season as Think CBS Kids, with a focus on live-action educational series such as The New Ghostwriter Mysteries, The Weird Al Show (which only unwillingly, and with great difficulty, complied with the E/I mandate as a condition of being picked up), and Wheel 2000—a children's version of the game show Wheel of Fortune. For the 1998–99 season, CBS relaunched the block once more as the CBS Kidshow; the block featured a slate of animated series from Canadian studio Nelvana, including adaptations of the children's book franchises Franklin and Dumb Bunnies.

NBC had already abandoned cartoons as Saturday morning programming in 1992 with the introduction of TNBC, which was a block that featured live-action teen sitcoms. By 2001, TNBC's viewership had seen major declines in its core demographic, while the median age of its viewers was around 41.

=== Outsourcing of programming ===
In the 2000s, multiple networks began to outsource their Saturday morning blocks to sister cable networks and third-party companies. After Viacom acquired CBS for the first time in 2000, it was announced that sister network Nickelodeon would program CBS's Saturday-morning lineup as Nick Jr. on CBS beginning in the 2000–01 season. The block primarily focused on preschool programming from the Nick Jr. brand. NBC partnered with cable network Discovery Kids to replace TNBC with Discovery Kids on NBC for the 2002–03 season; the block featured a mix of live-action, animated, reality competition, and factual series oriented towards science, technology, nature, and history. The block also marked the first time cartoons had aired on NBC's Saturday morning lineup since the TNBC era.

In 2001, Fox and its partner Saban Entertainment sold Fox Kids' assets—which included the Fox Family cable channel—to Disney. As a result, Fox discontinued the Fox Kids block in 2002, and returned its weekday daytime timeslots back to affiliates. The network would continue to provide airings of The Magic School Bus for E/I compliance at the discretion of affiliates, and entered into an agreement with 4Kids Entertainment to program a new Saturday morning block beginning in the 2002–03 season. That season, ABC's One Saturday Morning was rebranded as ABC Kids, which drew from the programming of Disney's cable networks Disney Channel, Toon Disney, and the newly rebranded ABC Family.

In January 2006, after CBS and Viacom split into separate companies, CBS partnered with DIC Entertainment to program a new Saturday morning block beginning in the 2006–07 season. Initially branded as KOL Secret Slumber Party under a sponsorship with America Online's KOL portal, it consisted of E/I programming targeting a female youth audience, including original programming and DIC library programs. The block was re-branded as KEWLopolis the following season as part of a new sponsorship with American Greetings, and Cookie Jar TV in 2009 following the acquisition of DIC by Cookie Jar Group.

Also in the 2006–07 season, NBC and its Spanish-language sister network Telemundo launched a new morning block known as Qubo, as a joint venture between NBC Universal, Ion Media Networks, Nelvana owner Corus Entertainment, Scholastic, and Classic Media. Qubo's blocks aired on NBC, Telemundo, and Ion Television, while Ion also offered a 24-hour Qubo channel on digital terrestrial television.

When The WB merged with UPN in 2006 to form The CW, the merged network initially maintained Kids' WB; by then the five-hour block only carried one hour of E/I programming at 7 a.m. ET/PT, which was branded as the "Pillow Head Hour". In October 2007, The CW reached a five-year agreement with 4Kids for it to program its Saturday morning block, resulting in the replacement of Kids' WB with The CW4Kids (later branded as Toonzai) in the 2008–09 season. The CW4Kids initially co-existed with the company's 4Kids TV block for Fox, and contained only a single half-hour of E/I programming. After a legal dispute with 4Kids over missed payments and insufficient national clearance, Fox reached a settlement to end its agreement with the company at the end of 2008. As a result, 4Kids TV would be replaced by a national block of paid programming beginning in January 2009.

In 2008, Spanish-language network Univision would introduce the new E/I block Planeta U; the block would initially consist primarily of Spanish-language dubs of existing children's educational programming such as Beakman's World, Inspector Gadget's Field Trip, and the Nickelodeon series Dora the Explorer and Go, Diego, Go!. Univision later reached an agreement with Disney in 2014 to introduce a Disney Junior sub-block to Planeta U, featuring Spanish-language dubs of programs such as Mickey Mouse Clubhouse and Handy Manny (the latter retooled to feature scenes teaching English vocabulary, as opposed to the English version's use of Spanish). It then added its first original program in 2015, Sesame Amigos—a Spanish-language spin-off of the long-running Sesame Street. The block was introduced in the wake of a $24 million fine against Univision Communications' stations for falsely declaring telenovelas lacking educational content and containing themes inappropriate for a youth audience as E/I programming.

Following Comcast's 2011 purchase of NBC Universal, it pulled out of the Qubo consortium and introduced the new NBC Kids and MiTelemundo blocks in July 2012, which were programmed by new sister network Sprout. Ion continued to operate the Qubo channel until February 2021, when it was shut down as part of the merger of Ion's operations with new owner E. W. Scripps Company.

In 2012, Saban Capital Group acquired some of 4Kids' assets as part of its chapter 11 bankruptcy, which included the company's contract to program The CW's Saturday morning lineup. Toonzai was subsequently re-launched by Saban as Vortexx in August 2012, with a mix of animated and live-action series (the latter including the Power Rangers franchise, and the WWE wrestling show Saturday Morning Slam). The CW remained the last major U.S. network to still program non-educational children's programming on weekend mornings.

=== Shift in demographics and content ===
The growing regulatory scrutiny, increasing competition from cable channels such as Cartoon Network, Disney Channel, and Nickelodeon, as well as video on-demand and streaming services, brought changes to viewing habits that made non-educational Saturday morning programming less viable for networks. Throughout the 2010s, the major networks began to schedule factual, documentary- and reality-style series aimed at a teen (13–16 years old) audience to fulfill their E/I obligations, rather than programming targeting preschool or preteen audiences. As they are targeting viewers older than 12 years old, these programs are not subject to the restrictions on advertising in the Children's Television Act.

ABC (Litton's Weekend Adventure in 2011), CBS (CBS Dream Team in 2013), The CW (One Magnificent Morning in 2014; The Washington Post wrote that its replacement of Vortexx signaled the "end" of Saturday morning cartoons), NBC (The More You Know in 2016; Spanish-language dubs began airing on Telemundo in 2018 under the MiTelemundo branding) all leased their weekend morning blocks to Litton Entertainment to air such E/I programming. Fox entered into a similar arrangement with Steve Rotfeld Productions to produce the STEM-based block Xploration Station for its affiliates, which premiered in September 2014. NBC argued that its The More You Know block was a better lead-out for Weekend Today's audience than the preschool programming it had aired before.

Peggy Charren's daughter Claudia Moquin criticized Litton for contravening the spirit of the CTA by including product placement and host-selling from "underwriters" in some of their programs, such as Electronic Arts, Norwegian Cruise Line, and SeaWorld Entertainment. Litton defended its practices, stating that its programming was designed to meet "child psychologist-developed standards that did not exist prior to 1990", and considered the brand placements in the programs to be "a far better alternative to the ads that have often previously aired during children's programming, whose sole purpose was to sell less than beneficial products to children".

PBS member stations have been an exception to this trend, with the network's PBS Kids block continuing to largely air animated, educational series catered towards a broad range of children's audiences ranging from preschoolers to preteens; as a non-commercial educational network, it does not rely on advertising revenue in the traditional sense, and its underwriting spots are not directly tied to ratings. PBS requires its member stations to take at least seven hours of PBS Kids programming on weekdays, while its national schedule previously fed 13 hours of PBS Kids programming per-day.

In February 2023, PBS reduced the amount of PBS Kids programming on the national schedule to eight hours per-day in the morning and early-afternoon hours; it cited viewing habits favoring its streaming platforms and 24-hour digital channel, and successful moves by member stations such as KPBS in San Diego and WOSU-TV in Columbus to cut back on the block in favor of more general interest programming (such as lifestyle shows, British dramas, and distance education programming). PBS would still provide a recommended schedule for the late-afternoon section of the PBS Kids block for member stations who wished to continue carrying the full schedule.

== Notable violations of the regulations ==
In 2007, Univision agreed to a record $24 million fine from the FCC for violations of the educational programming regulations across 24 of its stations. The fine acted upon complaints by the United Church of Christ and the National Hispanic Media Coalition, alleging that youth telenovelas claimed by Univision as E/I programming (including Amy, la niña de la mochila azul, Cómplices Al Rescate, and ¡Vivan Los Niños!) did not meet the requirements for core educational programming, citing their lack of actual educational content, and themes inappropriate for a youth audience. The following year, Univision would introduce the new E/I block Planeta U, which was initially drawn from dubs of existing English-language educational programs.

Airings of anime on Kids' WB induced notable violations of the program-length commercial restrictions. The network aired several commercials during the Pokémon anime for products with Pokémon-related cross-promotions, such as Eggo waffles, Fruit by the Foot, and the Nintendo e-Reader accessory for the Game Boy Advance. The FCC fined individual network affiliates of The WB and upheld the fines on appeal (despite WCIU-TV in Chicago trying to defend itself by arguing that the references were "fleeting"), even though it was the network which transmitted the content. In 2010, KSKN in Spokane was similarly fined $70,000 for having, on multiple occasions, aired an advertisement during Yu-Gi-Oh! for a local collectibles shop that contained references to its eponymous trading card game.

In 2004, Disney and Viacom were respectively issued $1 million and $500,000 fines for violating the limits on advertising during children's programming on the cable channels ABC Family and Nickelodeon. The fines were levied by the Federal Trade Commission, not the FCC, as cable channels are outside of the FCC's purview.

In September 2022, the FCC proposed a total of $3.4 million in fines for 21 television stations, which violated the program-length commercial rules by airing commercials for Hot Wheels toys during broadcasts of Team Hot Wheels. The largest fine of $2.65 million was issued to Sinclair Broadcast Group, who was also identified by stations as the originator of the offending programming and advertising. Nexstar Media Group was fined $182,000, and Sinclair-affiliated Cunningham Broadcasting was fined $140,000.

== See also ==
- Telecommunications Act of 1996
