= One Magnificent Morning =

Educational programming block on The CW

- Network: The CW
- Launched: October 4, 2014; 12 years ago
- Country of origin: United States
- Owner: Hearst Media Production Group
- Format: Saturday morning E/I block
- Running time: 5 hours (7:00 a.m. to 12:00 p.m.) (2014–17); 3 hours (8:00 a.m. to 11:00 a.m.) (2017–present)
- Original language: English

One Magnificent Morning (OMM) is an American programming block that is programmed by Hearst Media Production Group (formerly Litton Entertainment) and distributed by CBS Media Ventures, and debuted on October 4, 2014, as a replacement for the animation block Vortexx. It airs on Saturday mornings on the owned-and-operated stations and affiliates of The CW, the block features live-action documentary and lifestyle series aimed at teenagers between the ages of 13 and 18, the same style of programming that Litton provides for competing blocks seen on ABC, CBS, and NBC. All of the programs in the three-hour block are designed to meet federally mandated educational programming guidelines.

== History ==
On June 5, 2014, The CW announced that it would cancel its existing Saturday morning block Vortexx, which was produced by Saban Brands, in favor of One Magnificent Morning, a new, five-hour block produced by Litton Entertainment and distributed by CBS Television Distribution, that would feature live-action educational programming aimed teenagers and their parents. The move came as part of a growing shift by broadcast television networks towards non-fiction programming to fulfil the FCC-mandated requirement to air a quota of educational programming weekly. The previous year, Litton began producing CBS Dream Team, a similar E/I block for sister network CBS (former corporate parent CBS Corporation was a part-owner of The CW), and the company has also produced Litton's Weekend Adventure for ABC's affiliates since September 3, 2011.

Vortexx aired for the final time on September 27, 2014. It was thought to be the last conclusive Saturday morning block across the major U.S. commercial broadcast networks that primarily featured non-educational children's programming. Such content has gradually fallen out of favor because of the E/I rules, as well as shifts in viewing habits towards cable networks and online video on demand services for animation and youth-oriented content. One Magnificent Morning premiered the following week on October 4, 2014, following the cancellation of Vortexx in its 7:00 a.m. to Noon timeslot. As a consequence of the block launching three weeks after the traditional start of the syndication television season, Litton provided a temporary barter package of Everyday Health and Culture Click (which both formerly aired on Litton's Weekend Adventure) to CW stations, allowing those who depended on the OMM block to fulfill E/I guidelines to have programming before it started. Some initially announced shows that were not produced for the block were: America's Flavors, Social Media Mania, Swag, and Taste of Home.

On January 7, 2016, The CW and Litton announced a five-year renewal for the block, extending it through the 2020–21 broadcast season. On October 7, 2017, the block was reduced to the federally mandated minimum running time of three hours and began airing from 8:00 a.m. to 11:00 a.m. local time. The CW gave its two hours of reclaimed time to its affiliate stations. The agreement was further extended in 2021.

== Programming ==
Although One Magnificent Morning provides the three-hour minimum requirement of E/I programming each week, which exceeds defined under the Federal Communications Commission (FCC)'s Children's Television Act, some of The CW's owned-and-operated stations and affiliates continue to provide E/I-compliant programs acquired from the syndication market, mainly due to existing program distribution contracts. The CW Plus, in particular, continues to supply two hours of E/I-compliant syndicated programs within its national schedule following the block on Saturday afternoons, which further alleviates the service's subscription-subchannel affiliates from the responsibility of purchasing the local rights to such programs (the service's carriage of seven hours of E/I-compliant programming, and the fact that most of its affiliates operate as subchannels, allow The CW Plus's broadcast outlets to carry an additional subchannel without E/I interruptions under the Children's Television Act's programming regulations, as the local CW Plus outlet would have enough E/I content to cover both).

Some stations also added additional E/I programming to their schedules during the run of Save to Win, a game show co-produced by Litton and the American retail chain Family Dollar which was criticized as hidden paid programming advertising the chain. Several stations refused to list Save to Win within their quarterly E/I reports, unsure of its true educational value and wanting to avoid FCC scrutiny over the matter due to past fines involving product placement within a product's own television program which violated the Children's Television Act of 1990.

=== Current programming ===
Title	Premiere date
Jack Hanna's Into the Wild	October 5, 2019
Ocean Mysteries with Jeff Corwin	October 4, 2025

=== Former programming ===
Title	Premiere date	End date	Replaced	Replaced by	Notes	Ref.
Dog Whisperer: Family Edition	October 4, 2014	September 29, 2018	Vortexx programming	Ready, Set, Pet! Welcome Home; The Wildlife Docs; Did I Mention Invention?	The block's flagship series, and the longest running on the block	
The Brady Barr Experience	October 4, 2014	December 27, 2014	Vortexx programming			
Reluctantly Healthy	October 4, 2014	December 27, 2014	Vortexx programming			
Expedition Wild	October 4, 2014	September 26, 2015	Vortexx programming	Dream Quest		
Rock the Park	October 4, 2014	September 26, 2015	Vortexx programming	Hatched	Later aired as part of Litton's Weekend Adventure until March 27, 2021	
Calling Dr. Pol	October 4, 2014	September 30, 2017	Vortexx programming			
Dog Town, USA	July 4, 2015	September 24, 2016		Dinner Spinner		
Dream Quest	October 3, 2015	September 24, 2016		Unlikely Animal Friends		
Hatched	October 3, 2015	September 24, 2016		Rescue Me; Dinner Spinner		
Save Our Shelter	October 3, 2015	September 30, 2017				
Rescue Me with Dr. Lisa	October 1, 2016	December 31, 2016	Hatched			
Dinner Spinner	October 1, 2016	March 25, 2017	Hatched	Unlikely Animal Friends		
Unlikely Animal Friends	October 1, 2016	October 29, 2016	Dream Quest	Save to Win		
Unlikely Animal Friends	April 1, 2017	September 30, 2017	Dinner Spinner	Brain Games		
Vacation Creation	October 1, 2016	September 30, 2017		This Old House		
Save to Win	November 5, 2016	September 30, 2017	Unlikely Animal Friends	Brain Games		
Brain Games: Family Edition	October 7, 2017	December 30, 2017	Save to Win; Unlikely Animal Friends	Hidden Heroes		
This Old House: Trade School	October 7, 2017	September 25, 2021	Vacation Creation	Into the Wild	Hosted by Kevin O'Connor	
Chicken Soup for the Soul's Hidden Heroes	January 6, 2018	December 29, 2018	Brain Games	Animal Tales		
Welcome Home	October 6, 2018	September 28, 2019	Dog Whisperer	Into the Wild	co-produced with BYU TV	
The Wildlife Docs	October 6, 2018	September 28, 2019	Dog Whisperer	Into the Wild	From Litton's Weekend Adventure	
Did I Mention Invention?	October 6, 2018	September 26, 2020	Dog Whisperer	Tails of Valor		
Chicken Soup for the Soul's Animal Tales	January 5, 2019	June 27, 2020	Hidden Heroes	Jewels of the Natural World		
Jewels of the Natural World	July 4, 2020	December 26, 2020	Animal Tales	Best Friends Furever	Hosted by Nicole Gibbons	
Best Friends Furever with Kel Mitchell	January 2, 2021	September 25, 2021	Jewels of the Natural World	Ready, Set, Pet!		
The Open Road with Dr. Chris	October 2, 2021	December 30, 2023	Tails of Valor	Into The Wild	Removed for the 2022-2023 season for 1 year	
Ready, Set, Pet	October 6, 2018	September 24, 2022	Dog Whisperer; Best Friends Furever	Pet Vet Dream Team	Removed for the 2019-2020 season for 2 years	
Tails of Valor	October 3, 2020	September 30, 2023	The Open Road with Dr. Chris; Did I Mention Invention? Ready, Set, Pet	The Open Road with Dr. Chris; Into The Wild	Removed for the 2021-2022 season for 1 year	
Pet Vet Dream Team	October 1, 2022	December 30, 2023		Into The Wild		
