= CBS WKND =

Educational programming block on CBS

- Network: CBS; American Forces Network
- Launched: September 28, 2013; 12 years ago
- Country of origin: United States
- Formerly known as: CBS Dream Team (2013–2023)
- Format: Weekend morning educational program block
- Running time: 3 hours
- Original language: English

CBS WKND (previously known as CBS Dream Team) is an American programming block programmed by Hearst Media Production Group (formerly Litton Entertainment) which airs Saturday mornings on CBS under a time-lease agreement.

The block features three hours of live action documentary and lifestyle series aimed at pre-teens and adolescents ages 10 to 18, all of which are designed to comply with educational programming requirements defined by the Federal Communications Commission (FCC) under the Children's Television Act, and the first to air in high definition.

== History ==
Original logo, used from 2013 to 2016

On July 24, 2013, CBS announced that it had entered into a programming agreement with Litton Entertainment to launch a new weekend morning block featuring live-action lifestyle, wildlife, and documentary series aimed tweens/teens aged 10–18. It was the second block programming agreement Litton had made after launching Weekend Adventure for ABC stations two years earlier. Unlike the ABC deal (which technicality gave its programming time back to the affiliates to syndicate Litton's programming), the CBS deal for Litton was a traditional time brokerage agreement where CBS retained control over the time given to Litton.

CBS' decision to restructure the block and remove traditional animated and live-action scripted series from it, which had been airing at the time of the deal as part of Cookie Jar TV, a block produced by the Canada-based Cookie Jar Group (now WildBrain) and had aired on the network in various forms, was done in part to comply to secure educational content and advertising regulations in the Children's Television Act.

The CBS Dream Team launched on September 28, 2013. Its initial lineup consisted mainly of newer series, although Recipe Rehab moved form Weekend Adventure to Dream Team for its third season. The American Forces Network carries programming from the block for military children overseas. All of the block's programming features Descriptive Video Service for the visually impaired on the second audio program channel. The block was originally subtitled with the additional wording of "...It's Epic" until the tagline was quietly removed at the start of its 2020–21 season.

On October 7, 2023, the block was rebranded as CBS WKND ("WKND" being a disemvoweled abbreviation of "weekend"), bringing the block in line with the current CBS corporate identity.

== Programming ==
Although programs featured on CBS WKND are designed to meet federally mandated educational programming guidelines, some CBS stations may carry syndicated educational programs to provide supplementary E/I content. Some programs aired within the block may be deferred to Sunday morning slots, or (in the case of affiliates in the western United States), Saturday afternoons due to breaking news, severe weather coverage, or regional and CBS Sports commitments for coverage of both college football and college basketball, alongside select PGA golf events. Some stations may air the entirety of the block on tape delay to accommodate local weekend morning newscasts, CBS Saturday Morning or other local programming.

=== Current ===
Title	Premiere date	Replaced	Notes	References
The Henry Ford's Innovation Nation	September 27, 2014	Jamie's 15 Minute Meals; Did I Mention Invention?	Profiles of inventors and their efforts to create their inventions, hosted by Mo Rocca; Ended in 2024, but continued airing reruns until December 28, 2024; replaced by Extraordinary World; Reruns returned on October 4, 2025	
Hope In the Wild	September 29, 2018	Tails of Valor	Reruns returned on October 4, 2025	
Mission Unstoppable	September 28, 2019	The Inspectors	Hosted by Miranda Cosgrove, the program profiles female inventors in science, including Kellyn LaCour-Conant; Union project approved by SAG-AFTRA	
Lucky Dog: Reunions	October 7, 2023	Lucky Dog	First spin-off of Lucky Dog	
The Visioneers with Zay Harding	April 5, 2025	Hope In the Wild		
Lucky Dog: Down Under	October 4, 2025	Extraordinary World	Second spin-off of Lucky Dog	

=== Former ===
Title	Premiere date	End date	Replaced	Replaced by	Notes	References
Recipe Rehab	September 28, 2013	September 28, 2024	Cookie Jar TV programming Did I Mention Invention?	Hidden Heroes and Did I Mention Invention?	Cooking competition series centering on healthy alternatives to family recipes, hosted by Evette Rios and previously aired on Litton's Weekend Adventure; First run ended September 26, 2015; reruns returned on October 7, 2023	
Lucky Dog	September 28, 2013	September 30, 2023	Cookie Jar TV programming	Lucky Dog: Reunions	Originally hosted by Brandon McMillan; Series would air twice on select stations Longest-running series on the block and the flagship series Eighth season premiered on January 2, 2021, and hosted by dog trainers Eric and Rashi Wiese; Rebroadcasts of seasons 8 and 9 aired in place of All In as of January 7, 2023; The series also aired on Dabl on Sundays until 2024	
Jamie's 15-Minute Meals	September 28, 2013	September 20, 2014	Cookie Jar TV programming	Innovation Nation	Cooking series, hosted by Jamie Oliver	
Game Changers with Kevin Frazier	September 28, 2013	September 24, 2016	Cookie Jar TV programming		Profiles of the accomplishments of athletes in and outside their sports	
Dr. Chris: Pet Vet	September 28, 2013	May 25, 2019	Cookie Jar TV programming	Pet Vet Dream Team (nationally) and Hope in the Wild (rebroadcasts)	Documentary series, hosted by veterinarian Chris Brown	
All In with Laila Ali	September 28, 2013	September 24, 2022	Cookie Jar TV programming	Lucky Dog (rebroadcasts)	Profile series	
Chicken Soup for the Soul's Hidden Heroes	October 3, 2015	June 24, 2017	Recipe Rehab		A hidden camera series centering on people doing good deeds; hosted by Brooke Burke-Charvet	
The Inspectors	October 3, 2015	September 21, 2019	All In	Mission Unstoppable	Drama series centering on Preston Wainwright (played by Bret Green), a paralyzed teenager who helps his postal inspector mother (played by Jessica Lundy) solve crimes First scripted program	
Pet Vet Dream Team	April 7, 2018	September 24, 2022	Dr. Chris Pet Vet (nationally)	Did I Mention Invention?	Replaced national runs of Dr Chris: Pet Vet on June 1, 2019	
Tails of Valor	April 6, 2019	September 27, 2025	Pet Vet Dream Team; Lucky Dog	Hope in the Wild	Moved to The More You Know on NBC	
Best Friends Furever	September 28, 2019	September 26, 2020	Tails of Valor	All In		
Did I Mention Invention?	October 1, 2022	September 27, 2025	Pet Vet Dream Team; Recipe Rehab	Recipe Rehab; Innovation Nation	Profiles of inventors and their efforts to create their inventions, hosted by Alie Ward	
Extraordinary World with Jeff Corwin	January 4, 2025	September 27, 2025	Innovation Nation	Lucky Dog: Down Under		

== See also ==
- Children's Programming on CBS
