= Xploration Station =

Syndicated educational television programming block

- Network: Syndicated (primarily Fox stations)
- Launched: September 13, 2014; 12 years ago
- Country of origin: United States
- Format: E/I programming block
- Running time: 2 hours (2014–16); 3 hours (2016–present)

Xploration Station is an American syndicated programming block that is programmed by Steve Rotfeld Productions, distributed by Fox and Ion Television, and debuted on September 13, 2014. It airs weekends (typically on Saturday mornings), primarily on Fox-affiliated stations. Aimed towards teenagers, the block consists of six half-hour shows focusing on the STEM fields of science, technology, engineering, and mathematics. All of the programs in the three-hour block are produced to meet federally mandated educational programming guidelines. Boat Rocker Rights owns the shows' international rights.

== History ==
On December 17, 2013, Steve Rotfeld Productions announced that it would launch a two-hour syndicated block of live-action educational programs under the working title Xploration Nation, with Fox Television Stations and Tribune Broadcasting initially set to carry the block across their respective Fox owned-and-operated and affiliated stations. The block, aimed towards teenagers between 13 and 16 years of age, features programs focused on the STEM fields – such as marine biology, astronomy, and animal science. Production on one of the four shows, Xploration Outer Space, began in April 2014. The block, by then renamed Xploration Station, premiered on September 13, 2014.

On Fox owned and operated stations, Xploration Station replaced Weekend Marketplace, a two-hour block of infomercials first introduced in January 2009 following the closure of 4Kids TV due to conflicts between Fox and the block's programmer 4Kids Entertainment.

On January 20, 2015, Fox Television Stations renewed the block for the group's Fox owned-and-operated stations through 2017. The block was made available worldwide with the pick up of non-US distribution by Boat Rocker Rights in February 2016.

One of the more notable holdouts for Xploration Station in its first two seasons was Fox's largest affiliate group, Sinclair Broadcast Group. In September 2016, Sinclair began to carry Xploration Station on their Fox stations and two other Sinclair stations associated with a netlet under a five-year agreement with Steve Rotfeld Productions.

Starting in 2016, Xploration Station expanded its programming block to three hours.

== Programming ==
NOTE: Some stations usually only air one program, or have a different schedule due to public affairs, wanting to make room for other programs to air, or news broadcasting.

=== Current Programming ===
- Xploration Awesome Planet (since September 13, 2014): Hosted by Philippe Cousteau Jr., this series features a detailed look at earth science and geology.
- Xploration DIY Sci, also called DIY Sci, (since September 10, 2016): A pop-science series featuring the host, Steve Spangler, creating experiments using everyday items. AB Groupe carries the show in France.
- Xploration Outer Space (since September 13, 2014): This series focuses on various aspects of the space industry, including technology, the prospects of a human mission to Mars, and the growing space tourism industry. The program is hosted and produced by Emily Calandrelli, who was scouted by Steve Rotfeld from her YouTube productions for West Virginia University's engineering college. The program was picked up by AB Groupe in France and AMC in Central and Eastern Europe in June 2017.
- Life 2.0 (since August 12, 2020): This series covers how new technological advancements are going to impact humanity in the future, such as life extension and exploration to Mars. The show features Michio Kaku, David Andrew Sinclair, and Shara Evans.
- Second Chance Pets (since September 4, 2021): Hosted by Jim Alaimo, the series focuses on animals with disabilities who are in need of prosthetics.

=== Former Programming ===
- Xploration Animal Science (formerly Animal Science) (September 13, 2014 – 2016) – This program was originally broadcast in syndication in 2012, and was retooled for broadcast as part of Xploration Station.
- FabLab, became part of the Xploration Station programming block in early 2016 as an apparent mid-season replacement for Animal Science. The show has 4 hosts, 3 girls as it is focused toward female tween and teens.
- Weird But True! (September 10, 2016 – 2020): A co-production of Rotfeld Production and National Geographic Kids and is based on the magazine's most popular fun-facts feature and book series.
- Countdown to Apollo (2019): 8 episodes of 30 minutes length.
- Xploration Earth 2050 (September 13, 2014 – 2019): This series covers enhanced technology products for the next 3 decades. The first season of the series was hosted by Joe Penna. Seasons 2, 3, and 4 are hosted by Chuck Pell, with Season 4 (2018) winning a Daytime Emmy Award for Outstanding Special Class Series, the first Emmy win for Xploration Station.
- Xploration: Nature Knows Best (September 10, 2016 – 2017): Marine biologist Danni Washington hosts this show about nature based technological advancements. AB Groupe carries the show in France while AMC in Central and Eastern Europe does.

== Reception ==
Animal Science was nominated in 2014 for a Daytime Emmy Award for Outstanding Children's Series.

At the 45th Daytime Emmy Awards, Xploration Earth 2050 won the award for Outstanding Special Class Series. At the 46th Daytime Emmy Awards, Weird but True! won the award for Outstanding Education or Informational Series.

Second Chance Pets broadcasts on Hong Kong–based station ViuTV.

Xploration Awesome Planet broadcasts on New Zealand's TVNZ Duke.
