= 2025–26 United States network television schedule (late night) =

The 2025–26 network late night television schedule for the four major English-language commercial broadcast networks in the United States covers the late night hours from September 2025 to August 2026. The schedule is followed by a list per network of returning series, new series, and series canceled after the 2024–25 television season.

PBS is not included at all, as its member television stations have local flexibility over most of their schedules and broadcast times for network shows may vary. (PBS does offer its member stations packages of Amanpour & Company and BBC World News to air in late night timeslots Monday–Friday, and optional overnight access to its satellite feed, which rebroadcasts prime time programs shown either the previous evening or earlier in the week). MyNetworkTV and The CW are not included as neither programming service offer late night programs of any kind except for overflow of primetime CW Sports programming.

Fox is not included in the weekday and Sunday schedule, as it only airs late night network programming on Saturdays, and ABC and CBS are not included in the weekend schedule as both networks only air late night network programming on weekdays (except for Inside the NBA and overruns of primetime programming due to sports). NBC is not included on Sundays as it does not offer any network late night programming on Sundays year-round (outside of overruns and occasional of its prime time NBC Sports game telecasts into the late night time period during Fall–Spring).

== Legend ==
- Light blue indicates local programming.
- Yellow indicates late night talk shows.
- Blue-gray indicates news programming.
- Light green indicates sporting events.
- Gray indicates encore programming.

== Schedule ==
- New series are highlighted in **bold**.
- Repeat airings or same-day rebroadcasts are indicated by **(R)**.
- All times correspond to U.S. Eastern and Pacific Time scheduling (except for some live sports or events). Except where affiliates slot certain programs outside their network-dictated timeslots, subtract one hour for Central, Mountain, Alaska, and Hawaii–Aleutian times.
- Local schedules may differ, as affiliates have the option to pre-empt or delay network programs, and fill timeslots not allocated to network programs with local, syndicated, or paid programming at their discretion. Such scheduling may be limited to preemptions caused by local or national breaking news or weather coverage (which may force stations to tape delay certain programs in overnight timeslots or defer them to a co-operated station or a digital subchannel in their regular timeslot) and any overrunning major sports events scheduled to air in a weekday timeslot (mainly during major holidays). Stations may air shows at other times at their preference.
- All sporting events air live in all time zones in correspondence to U.S. Eastern Time with local and/or network late night programming after game completion.

=== Weeknights ===
Network		11:00 p.m.	11:30 p.m.	12:00 a.m.	12:30 a.m.	1:00 a.m.	1:30 a.m.
ABC		Local programming	Jimmy Kimmel Live! (11:35 p.m.)		Nightline (12:37 a.m.)	Local programming (1:07 a.m.)	
CBS	Fall	Local programming	The Late Show with Stephen Colbert (11:35 p.m.)		Comics Unleashed With Byron Allen (R) (12:37 a.m.)		Local programming (1:37 a.m.)
CBS	Spring	Local programming	Comics Unleashed With Byron Allen (R) (11:35 p.m.)		Funny You Should Ask (R) (12:37 a.m.)		Local programming (1:37 a.m.)
NBC		Local programming	The Tonight Show Starring Jimmy Fallon (11:35 p.m.)		Late Night with Seth Meyers (12:37 a.m.)		Local programming (1:37 a.m.)

Notes:

- From September 17 to September 22, ABC aired encore episodes of Celebrity Family Feud at 11:35 p.m. Jimmy Kimmel Live! returned on September 23, with the exception of ABC stations owned by Sinclair Broadcast Group or Nexstar Media Group. Both Sinclair and Nexstar would eventually restore Kimmel to its ABC stations on September 26.
- ABC, CBS and NBC affiliates offer their rebroadcasts of the network evening newscasts to accommodate local scheduling in selecting markets that do not offer encores of the local late news; some stations that air encores of their local late newscasts will air the rebroadcast alongside the network evening news rebroadcasts (either acting as a lead-in to the networks' overnight newscasts), or with syndicated and time-lease programs.
- In the Eastern and Central time zones only, on weeks when ABC airs a Monday Night Football game on Monday evenings during fall, its late night programming will begin 15 minutes later, all other time zones air late night programming as normal on these weeks.
- In the Eastern and Central time zones, on Tuesdays during the NBA Regular season, NBC may adjust or preempt late night programming on Tuesdays (except for February 24, 2026 due to NBC News coverage airing in East Coast Primetime) when the affiliates opt to air the late 10/11 pm et/ (7/8 pm PT) NBA game (and on October 21 and December 23, 29 and 30, 2025 in which Eastern and Central time zones will be required to air the late 10/10:30 p.m. ET (7/7:30 p.m. PT) game), late night programming in all other time zones and affiliates airing the early 8 pm et/5 pm pt game will be normal on these weeks.
- During the NBA playoffs, NBC will delay all late night programming until immediately following the games on Mondays and Tuesdays (1 a.m. ET/12am CT/11pm MT/10 pm PT, (all time zones from the Pacific time zone and westward will air Dateline NBC at 10 pm PT), all time zones west of Mountain time zone will then air late night programming at its normal time on these weeks) with NBA games airing in the traditional late night time period in Eastern and Central time zones.
- From June 11 to July 19, 2026, as part of its 2026 FIFA World Cup coverage, Fox aired FIFA World Cup on FOX After Hours with James Corden a 26-episode nightly comedic recap show with former CBS Late Late Show host James Corden. The show airs from midnight to 1 am.

=== Saturday ===
Network		11:00 p.m.	11:30 p.m.	12:00 a.m.	12:30 a.m.	1:00 a.m.	1:30 a.m.
Fox	Fall	Fox College Football (8:00 p.m.)	The Quiz with Balls (R)		Local programming		
Fox	Late fall	The Floor (R)		Local programming			
Fox	Winter	**99 to Beat** (R)		Local programming			
Fox	Spring	**Fear Factor: House of Fear** (R)		Local programming			
Fox	Summer	The 1% Club (R)		Local programming			
NBC		Local programming	Saturday Night Live			Local programming	

Notes:

- NBC affiliates offer their rebroadcasts of the network evening newscasts to accommodate local scheduling in selecting markets that do not offer encores of the local late news; some stations that air encores of their local late newscasts will air the rebroadcast alongside the network evening news rebroadcasts (either acting as a lead-in to the networks' overnight newscasts), or with syndicated and time-lease programs.
- Fox's late night lineup begins at 11 p.m. PT/10 p.m. MT on weeks when Fox Sports programming goes beyond 11 p.m. ET/10 p.m. CT and at the sporting event's conclusion in the Eastern and Central time zones.

== By network ==
=== ABC ===
Returning series:

- Jimmy Kimmel Live!
- Nightline

New series:

- Inside the NBA (moved from TNT)

=== CBS ===
Returning series:

- The Late Show with Stephen Colbert
- Comics Unleashed with Byron Allen (reruns)
- Funny You Should Ask (reruns)

Not returning from 2024-25:

- After Midnight

=== Fox ===
Limited series

- FIFA World Cup on FOX After Hours with James Corden (midnight to 1 am, June 11—July 19, 2026)

Returning series:

- Fox College Football

=== NBC ===
Returning series:

- Late Night with Seth Meyers
- Saturday Night Live
- The Tonight Show Starring Jimmy Fallon

== Renewals and cancellations ==
=== Cancellations/series endings ===
==== CBS ====
- The Late Show with Stephen Colbert—It was announced on July 17, 2025, that season eleven would be the final season, the series concluded on May 21, 2026.

== See also ==
- 2025–26 United States network television schedule (prime-time)
- 2025–26 United States network television schedule (morning)
- 2025–26 United States network television schedule (daytime)
- 2025–26 United States network television schedule (overnight)
