= 2023–24 United States network television schedule (daytime) =

The 2023–24 afternoon network television schedule for the four major English-language commercial broadcast networks in the United States covers the weekday and weekend afternoon hours from September 2023 to August 2024. The schedule is followed by a list per network of returning and cancelled shows from the 2022–23 season. The daytime schedules for the four major networks that offer afternoon programming are expected to remain consistent with the prior television season.

Affiliates fill time periods not occupied by network programs with local or syndicated programming. PBS – which offers daytime programming through a children's program block, PBS Kids – is not included, as its member television stations have local flexibility over most of their schedules and broadcast times for network shows may vary. Also not included are The CW and MyNetworkTV (as the programming services do not offer daytime programs of any kind except for LIV Golf, Arizona Bowl, and Atlantic Coast Conference) and The CW Plus (as its schedule is composed mainly of syndicated reruns).

Fox is not included on the weekday schedule as it only airs afternoon programming (in the form of sports content) during weekends.

Please note that the schedules for the networks are affected by the 2023 Hollywood labor disputes.

== Legend ==
- Light blue indicates local programming.
- Yellow indicates talk shows.
- Chartreuse indicates soap operas.
- Blue-gray indicates news programming.
- Light green indicates sporting events.
- Light teal indicates programs not applicable to the above categorizations.
- Light yellow indicates the current schedule.

== Schedule ==
- New series are highlighted in **bold**.
- All times correspond to U.S. Eastern and Pacific Time scheduling (except for some live sports or events). Except where affiliates slot certain programs outside their network-dictated timeslots, subtract one hour for Central, Mountain, Alaska, and Hawaii-Aleutian times.
- Local schedules may differ, as affiliates have the option to pre-empt or delay network programs. Such scheduling may be limited to preemptions caused by local or national breaking news or weather coverage (which may force stations to tape delay certain programs in overnight timeslots or defer them to a co-operated station or digital subchannel in their regular timeslot) and any major sports events scheduled to air in a weekday timeslot (mainly during major holidays). Stations may air shows at other times at their preference.
- All sporting events air live in all time zones in U.S. Eastern time, with local and/or primetime programming by affiliates after game completion.

=== Weekdays ===
Network	Noon	12:30 p.m.	1:00 p.m.	1:30 p.m.	2:00 p.m.	2:30 p.m.	3:00 p.m.	3:30 p.m.	4:00 p.m.	4:30 p.m.	5:00 p.m.	5:30 p.m.	6:00 p.m.	6:30 p.m.	7:00 p.m.	7:30 p.m.
ABC	Local and/or syndicated programming		GMA3: What You Need To Know**		General Hospital*		Local and/or syndicated programming							ABC World News Tonight	Local and/or syndicated programming	
CBS	Local and/or syndicated programming	The Young and the Restless		The Bold and the Beautiful	The Talk		Local and/or syndicated programming							CBS Evening News	Local and/or syndicated programming	
NBC	**NBC News Daily*****		Local and/or syndicated programming											NBC Nightly News	Local and/or syndicated programming	

Notes:

- Depending on their choice of feed, CBS stations have the option of airing Let's Make a Deal at either 10:00 a.m. or 3:00 p.m. Eastern (airtime adjusted by time zone), and/or The Young and the Restless at 11:00 or 11:30 a.m. local time (in the Central, Mountain, and Pacific time zones).

(*) ABC stations have the option of airing General Hospital at 2:00 or 3:00 p.m. Eastern Time, depending on the station's choice of feed.

(**) ABC stations have the option of GMA3 anytime between noon-2:00 p.m. Eastern Time, depending on the station's choice of feed.

(***) NBC stations have the option of airing NBC News Daily anytime between noon-4 p.m. Eastern Time, as live feeds are provided each hour

=== Saturday ===
Network		Noon	12:30 p.m.	1:00 p.m.	1:30 p.m.	2:00 p.m.	2:30 p.m.	3:00 p.m.	3:30 p.m.	4:00 p.m.	4:30 p.m.	5:00 p.m.	5:30 p.m.	6:00 p.m.	6:30 p.m.	7:00 p.m.	7:30 p.m.
ABC	Fall	ESPN College Football on ABC														College Football Scoreboard	ESPN Saturday Night Football on ABC (continued to game completion)
ABC	Winter	Local and/or syndicated programming	ABC Hockey Saturday Pregame	ABC Hockey Saturday										Local and/or syndicated programming	ABC World News Tonight	Local and/or syndicated programming	
ABC	Spring	Local and/or syndicated programming	WNBA Countdown	WNBA on ABC										Local and/or syndicated programming	ABC World News Tonight	Local and/or syndicated programming	
ABC	Summer	ESPN on ABC sports programming										Local and/or syndicated programming			ABC World News Tonight	Local and/or syndicated programming	
CBS	Fall	Local, syndicated and/or CBS Sports programming						College Football Today	SEC on CBS							Local and/or syndicated programming	
CBS	Winter	College Basketball on CBS												Local and/or syndicated programming	CBS Weekend News	Local and/or syndicated programming	
CBS	Spring	Local, syndicated and/or CBS Sports programming						PGA Tour on CBS						Local and/or syndicated programming	CBS Weekend News	Local and/or syndicated programming	
CBS	Summer	Big3 on CBS						PGA Tour on CBS						Local and/or syndicated programming	CBS Weekend News	Local and/or syndicated programming	
Fox	Fall	Fox College Football (continued to game completion)															
Fox	Winter	Fox College Hoops (continued to game completion)															
Fox	Spring	Local, syndicated and/or Fox Sports programming								UFL on Fox						Baseball Night in America (continued until game completion)	
Fox	Summer	Local, syndicated and/or Fox Sports programming						Horse racing on Fox						Local and/or syndicated programming		Baseball Night in America (continued until game completion)	
NBC	Fall	Local and/or syndicated programming	Premier League on NBC				Notre Dame Football on NBC									College Countdown	College Football on NBC (continued to game completion)
NBC	Winter	Local and/or syndicated programming	Premier League on NBC				Golf Channel on NBC							Local and/or syndicated programming	NBC Nightly News	Local and/or syndicated programming	
NBC	Spring	Local and/or syndicated programming	Premier League on NBC				Premier League Goal Zone	NBC Sports programming						Local and/or syndicated programming	NBC Nightly News	Local and/or syndicated programming	
NBC	Summer	NBC Sports programming												Local and/or syndicated programming	NBC Nightly News	Local and/or syndicated programming	

Notes:

- To comply with FCC educational programming regulations, stations may defer certain programs featured in their respective network's E/I program blocks to determined weekend late morning or afternoon time periods if a sporting event is not scheduled in the timeslot or in place of paid programming that would otherwise be scheduled.
- Airtimes of sporting events may vary depending on the offerings scheduled for that weekend.
- NBC Nightly News airs in the Eastern and Central Time zones when Notre Dame Football on NBC does not air a 3:30 p.m. ET game.
- CBS Weekend News airs in the Eastern and Central time zones when SEC on CBS does not air a 3:30 p.m. ET game.

=== Sunday ===
Network		Noon	12:30 p.m.	1:00 p.m.	1:30 p.m.	2:00 p.m.	2:30 p.m.	3:00 p.m.	3:30 p.m.	4:00 p.m.	4:30 p.m.	5:00 p.m.	5:30 p.m.	6:00 p.m.	6:30 p.m.
ABC	Fall	Local, ESPN on ABC sports and/or syndicated programming						WNBA on ABC				Local and/or syndicated programming			ABC World News Tonight
ABC	Winter	Local and/or syndicated programming	NBA Countdown	NBA Sunday Showcase										Local and/or syndicated programming	ABC World News Tonight
ABC	Spring	Local and/or syndicated programming	WNBA Countdown	WNBA on ABC										Local and/or syndicated programming	ABC World News Tonight
ABC	Summer	ESPN on ABC sports programming										Local and/or syndicated programming			ABC World News Tonight
CBS	Fall	The NFL Today		NFL on CBS (continued until game completion)											
CBS	Winter	College Basketball on CBS												Local and/or syndicated programming	CBS Weekend News
CBS	Spring	Local, CBS Sports and/or syndicated programming						PGA Tour on CBS						Local and/or syndicated programming	CBS Weekend News
CBS	Summer	Big3 on CBS						PGA Tour on CBS						Local and/or syndicated programming	CBS Weekend News
Fox	Fall	Fox NFL Sunday		Fox NFL (continued until game completion)											
Fox	Winter	Local, syndicated and/or Fox Sports programming					NASCAR RaceDay		NASCAR on Fox						
Fox	Spring	Local, syndicated and/or Fox Sports programming						UFL on Fox							
Fox	Summer	Local, syndicated and/or Fox Sports programming								NHRA on Fox					
NBC	Fall	Local and/or syndicated programming		NASCAR America		NASCAR on NBC								Local and/or syndicated programming	NBC Nightly News
NBC	Winter	NBC Sports programming					Golf Channel on NBC							Local and/or syndicated programming	NBC Nightly News
NBC	Spring	NBC Sports programming												Local and/or syndicated programming	NBC Nightly News

Notes:

- To comply with FCC educational programming regulations, stations may defer certain programs featured in their respective network's E/I program blocks to determined weekend late morning or afternoon time periods if a sporting event is not scheduled in the timeslot or in place of paid programming that would otherwise be scheduled.
- Airtimes of sporting events may vary depending on the offerings scheduled for that weekend.
- When CBS and/or Fox offer an early singleheader NFL game, a post-game show airs after the game from 4:30–5:00 p.m. ET (the length of which may vary depending on the timing of the early game's conclusion) with local, syndicated or non-NFL sports programming airing after from 5:00–7:00 p.m. ET. Meanwhile, when CBS and/or Fox offer a late singleheader NFL game, local, syndicated or non-NFL sports programming airs from 1:00–4:00 p.m. ET/10:00 a.m.–1:00 p.m. PT.
- ABC, CBS and/or NBC stations may air their corresponding network's early evening newscast at 6:00 or 6:30 p.m. ET and PT/5:00 or 5:30 p.m. CT/MT, depending on the station's choice of feed.
- NBC Nightly News airs live in all time zones during Fall to avoid pre-emption due to the live airing of NBC Sunday Night Football.
- CBS Weekend News airs on the Eastern and Central time zones at 6:30 p.m. ET/5:30 p.m. CT when NFL on CBS does not air late NFL games. All other time zones air the program regardless of receiving or not a late game.

== By network ==
=== ABC ===
Returning series:

- ABC News
  - ABC World News Tonight
  - GMA3: What You Need To Know
- ESPN on ABC
  - College Football Scoreboard
  - ESPN College Basketball on ABC
  - ESPN College Football on ABC
  - NBA Countdown
  - NBA Sunday Showcase
  - ABC Hockey Saturday (Note: Third revival on ABC and second contractually shared with ESPN; previously aired on ABC from 1992–94 under a time-buy agreement, and from 1999–2004.)
  - WNBA on ABC
  - UFL on ABC (was XFL in 2023)
- General Hospital
- The View

=== CBS ===
Returning series:

- The Bold and the Beautiful
- CBS Evening News
- CBS Sports
  - College Basketball on CBS
  - The NFL Today
  - NFL on CBS
  - PGA Tour on CBS
  - SEC on CBS/College Football on CBS
- The Talk
- The Young and the Restless

=== Fox ===
Returning series:

- Fox Sports
  - Fox College Football
  - Fox College Hoops
  - Fox NFL Sunday
  - NASCAR on Fox
  - NASCAR RaceDay

=== NBC ===
Returning series:

- NBC News
  - NBC News Daily
  - NBC Nightly News
- NBC Sports
  - Golf Channel on NBC
  - IndyCar on NBC
  - NASCAR America
  - NASCAR on NBC
  - Notre Dame Football on NBC
  - Premier League on NBC

== Renewals and cancellations ==
=== Series renewals ===
==== ABC ====
- ABC Hockey Saturday—Renewed for an eleventh season on March 10, 2021; deal will into a fourteenth season in 2027.
- United Football League—Renewed for a fourth season on May 17, 2022; deal will into a sixth season in 2027.

==== CBS ====
- NFL on CBS/The NFL Today—Renewed through the 2032–33 season on March 18, 2021.
- The Talk—Renewed for a fifteenth and final season on April 12, 2024.
- The Young and the Restless—Renewed through the 2027–28 season on February 27, 2024.

==== Fox ====
- Fox NFL Sunday/Fox NFL—Renewed through the 2032–33 season on March 18, 2021.

=== Cancellations ===
==== CBS ====
- SEC on CBS—On December 20, 2019, CBS announced that it would not renew its agreement with the Southeastern Conference beyond the 2023 season. The Big Ten Conference will replace the SEC in the time slot beginning in the 2024 season.

==== NBC ====
- USFL on NBC—On December 5, 2023, NBC announced it would opt out of the final year of its contract with the USFL, which ultimately merged with the XFL to form the United Football League later that month.

== See also ==
- 2023–24 United States network television schedule (prime-time)
- 2023–24 United States network television schedule (morning)
- 2023–24 United States network television schedule (late night)
- 2023–24 United States network television schedule (overnight)

== Sources ==
- Curt Alliaume. "ABC Daytime Schedule". Curt Alliaume’s Utterly Irrelevant Web Site. Archived from the original on October 15, 2007.
- Curt Alliaume. "CBS Daytime Schedule". Curt Alliaume’s Utterly Irrelevant Web Site. Archived from the original on October 15, 2007.
- Curt Alliaume. "NBC Daytime Schedule". Curt Alliaume’s Utterly Irrelevant Web Site. Archived from the original on October 12, 2007.
