= 2024–25 United States network television schedule (late night) =

The 2024–25 network late night television schedule for the four major English-language commercial broadcast networks in the United States covers the late night hours from September 2024 to August 2025. The schedule is followed by a list per network of returning series, new series, and series canceled after the 2023–24 television season.

PBS is not included at all, as its member television stations have local flexibility over most of their schedules and broadcast times for network shows may vary. (PBS does offer its member stations packages of Amanpour & Company and BBC World News to air in late night timeslots Monday–Friday, and optional overnight access to its satellite feed, which rebroadcasts prime time programs shown either the previous evening or earlier in the week). MyNetworkTV and The CW are not included as neither programming service offer late night programs of any kind except for overflow of primetime CW Sports programming.

Fox is not included in the weekday and Sunday schedule, as it only airs late night network programming on Saturdays, and ABC and CBS are not included in the weekend schedule as both networks only air late night network programming on weekdays (except overruns of primetime programming due to sports). NBC is not included on Sundays as it does not offer any network late night programming on Sundays year-round (outside of overruns of its prime time Sunday Night Football game telecasts into the late night time period during Fall).

== Legend ==
- Light blue indicates local programming.
- Yellow indicates late night talk shows.
- Blue-gray indicates news programming.
- Light green indicates sporting events.
- Gray indicates encore programming.

== Schedule ==
- New series are highlighted in **bold**.
- Repeat airings or same-day rebroadcasts are indicated by **(R)**.
- All times correspond to U.S. Eastern and Pacific Time scheduling (except for some live sports or events). Except where affiliates slot certain programs outside their network-dictated timeslots, subtract one hour for Central, Mountain, Alaska, and Hawaii–Aleutian times.
- Local schedules may differ, as affiliates have the option to pre-empt or delay network programs, and fill timeslots not allocated to network programs with local, syndicated, or paid programming at their discretion. Such scheduling may be limited to preemptions caused by local or national breaking news or weather coverage (which may force stations to tape delay certain programs in overnight timeslots or defer them to a co-operated station or a digital subchannel in their regular timeslot) and any overrunning major sports events scheduled to air in a weekday timeslot (mainly during major holidays). Stations may air shows at other times at their preference.
- All sporting events air live in all time zones in correspondence to U.S. Eastern Time with local and/or network late night programming after game completion.

=== Weeknights ===
Network	11:00 p.m.	11:30 p.m.	12:00 a.m.	12:30 a.m.	1:00 a.m.	1:30 a.m.
ABC	Local programming	Jimmy Kimmel Live! (11:35 p.m.)		Nightline (12:37 a.m.)	Local programming (1:07 a.m.)	
CBS	Local programming	The Late Show with Stephen Colbert (11:35 p.m.)		After Midnight (12:37 a.m.)		Local programming (1:37 a.m.)
NBC	Local programming	The Tonight Show Starring Jimmy Fallon (11:35 p.m.)		Late Night with Seth Meyers (12:37 a.m.)		Local programming (1:37 a.m.)

Note:

- ABC, CBS and NBC affiliates offer their rebroadcasts of the network evening newscasts to accommodate local scheduling in selecting markets that do not offer encores of the local late news; some stations that air encores of their local late newscasts will air the rebroadcast alongside the network evening news rebroadcasts (either acting as a lead-in to the networks' overnight newscasts), or with syndicated and time-lease programs.
- In the Eastern and Central time zones only, on weeks when ABC airs a Monday Night Football game on Monday evenings during fall, its late night programming will begin 15 minutes later, all other time zones air late night programming as normal on these weeks.

=== Saturday ===
Network		11:00 p.m.	11:30 p.m.	12:00 a.m.	12:30 a.m.	1:00 a.m.	1:30 a.m.
Fox	Fall	Fox College Football (8:00 p.m.)	The Quiz with Balls (R)		Local programming		
Fox	Mid-fall	Fox College Football (8:00 p.m.)	The Floor (R)		Local programming		
Fox	Winter	Special Forces: World's Toughest Test (R)		Local programming			
Fox	Late winter	**Extracted** (R)		Local programming			
Fox	Spring	Next Level Chef (R)		Local programming			
Fox	Summer	The Quiz with Balls (R)		Local programming			
NBC		Local programming	Saturday Night Live			Local programming	

Notes:

- NBC affiliates offer their rebroadcasts of the network evening newscasts to accommodate local scheduling in selecting markets that do not offer encores of the local late news; some stations that air encores of their local late newscasts will air the rebroadcast alongside the network evening news rebroadcasts (either acting as a lead-in to the networks' overnight newscasts), or with syndicated and time-lease programs.
- Fox's late night lineup begins at 11 p.m. PT/10 p.m. MT on weeks when Fox Sports programming goes beyond 11 p.m. ET/10 p.m. CT and at the sporting event's conclusion in the Eastern and Central time zones.

== By network ==
=== ABC ===
Returning series:

- Jimmy Kimmel Live!
- Nightline

=== CBS ===
Returning series:

- After Midnight
- The Late Show with Stephen Colbert

Not returning from 2023–24:

- Comics Unleashed with Byron Allen (returning in 2025–26)

=== Fox ===
Returning series:

- Fox College Football
- The Quiz with Balls (reruns)
- The Floor (reruns)
- Special Forces: World's Toughest Test (reruns)
- Next Level Chef (reruns)

New series:

- Extracted (reruns)

=== NBC ===
Returning series:

- Late Night with Seth Meyers
- Saturday Night Live
- The Tonight Show Starring Jimmy Fallon

== See also ==
- 2024–25 United States network television schedule (prime-time)
- 2024–25 United States network television schedule (morning)
- 2024–25 United States network television schedule (daytime)
- 2024–25 United States network television schedule (overnight)
