= Jack Hanna's Animal Adventures =

American wildlife documentary series for children

- Genre: Nature documentary
- Written by: Tom Horn; Renne Leatto
- Presented by: Jack Hanna
- Country of origin: United States
- Original language: English

Production
- Production locations: Busch Gardens Tampa; Tampa, Florida, United States
- Running time: 30 minutes
- Production companies: VideoTours; Litton Entertainment

Original release
- Network: Syndication
- Release: October 2, 1993 – May 24, 2008

Related
- Jack Hanna's Into the Wild; Jack Hanna's Wild Countdown

Jack Hanna's Animal Adventures was a nature documentary video/television series that was run by Jack Hanna, Director Emeritus of the Columbus Zoo and Aquarium. The program ran from 1993 to 2008. It was shown daily and weekly in syndication worldwide on numerous stations and networks, especially in the United States.

It was particularly popular in part because of Hanna's mainstream name recognition as an animal expert, but also because the show meets programming criteria for the U.S.'s federally mandated educational and informational requirements which all stations must follow. Because of this, the program is available for syndication up to five days per week, thus covering all but a half hour of the three-hour E/I mandate.

Jack Hanna's Animal Adventures is owned and distributed by Hearst.
