= Jack Hanna =

American zookeeper and wildlife conservationist

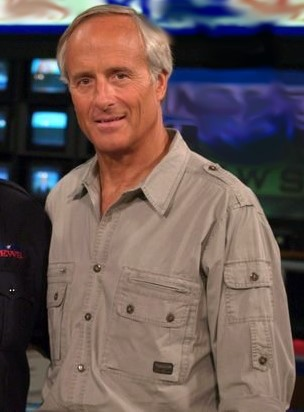
- Hanna in 2006
- Born: Jack Bushnell Hanna; January 2, 1947 (age 79); Knoxville, Tennessee, U.S.
- Other name: Jungle Jack
- Education: The Kiski School
- Alma mater: Muskingum University (BA)
- Occupations: Zoo director; zookeeper; conservationist
- Years active: 1973–2020
- Notable work: Jack Hanna's Animal Adventures; Jack Hanna's Into the Wild; Jack Hanna's Wild Countdown; Jack Hanna's Passport
- Spouse: Suzi Egli (m. 1968)
- Children: 3
- Website: www.jackhanna.com

Jack Bushnell Hanna (born January 2, 1947) is an American retired zookeeper and director emeritus of the Columbus Zoo and Aquarium in Ohio. Commonly nicknamed "Jungle Jack", he was director of the zoo from 1978 to 1992, and is viewed as largely responsible for elevating its quality and reputation. His various television shows and media appearances, particularly with Johnny Carson, David Letterman, James Corden, Good Morning America, and Maury Povich have made him one of the most notable animal experts in the United States.

In 2019, Hanna was diagnosed with Alzheimer's disease, and subsequently stepped away from his official roles to be cared for by his family.

== Early life ==
Hanna was born in Knoxville, Tennessee. He grew up on his family's farm and volunteered for the family veterinarian, Dr. Roberts, when he was 11. He attended The Kiski School, an all-boys boarding school in Saltsburg, Pennsylvania, for high school, graduating in 1965. He majored in business and political science at Muskingum College in New Concord, Ohio, where he kept ducks in his dorm room and a donkey in a shed behind his fraternity house (The M.A.C.E. Club). In his senior year, Hanna married Suzi, a cheerleader at Muskingum, and graduated in 1968.

== Career ==
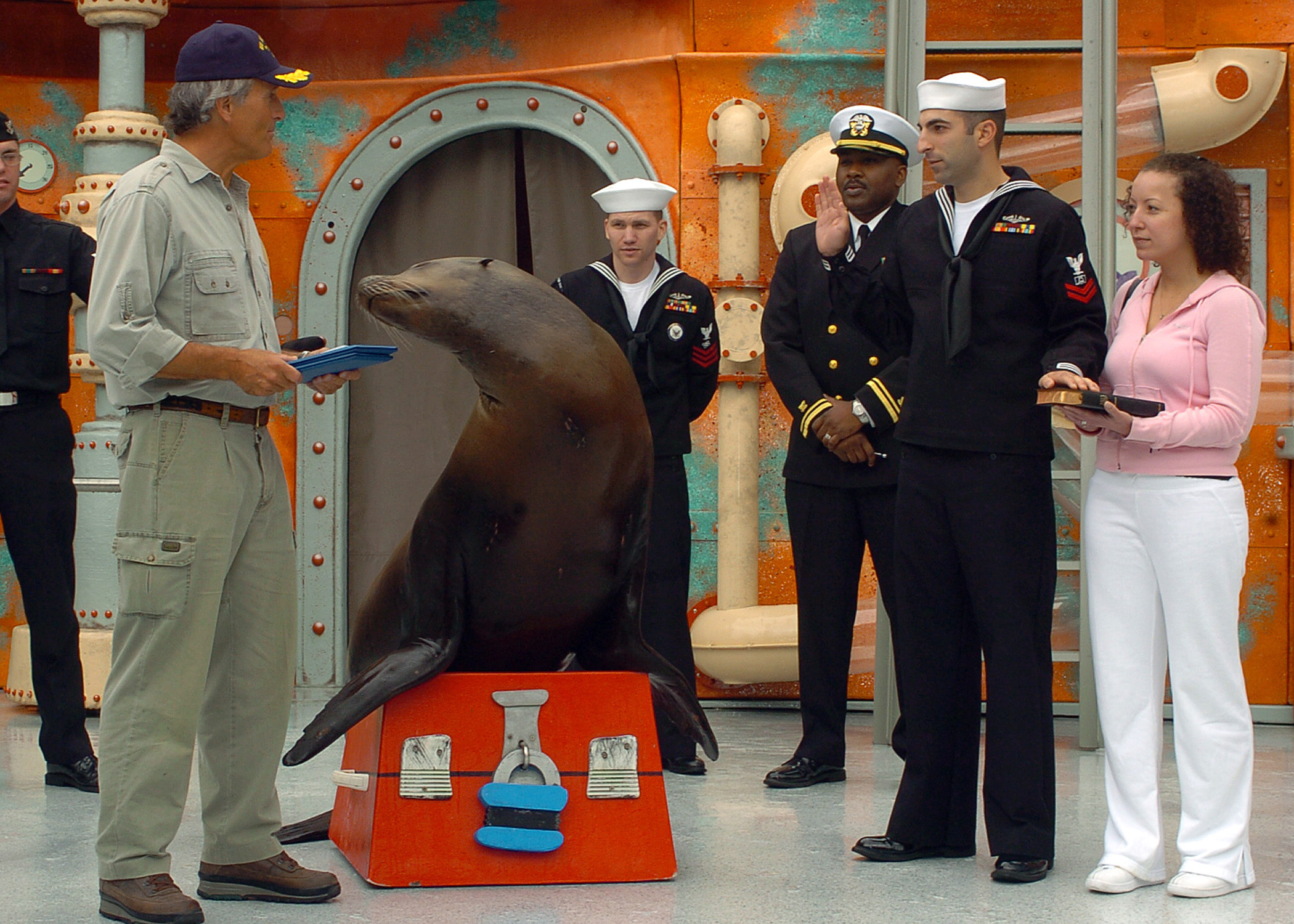
Hanna (left) reenlists Culinary Specialist 2nd Class Richard Youhan with Seamore, the sea lion

Although unable to secure zoning as a zoo for his family's farm, Hanna and Suzi opened a pet shop and petting zoo. In 1972, a three-year-old boy was mauled by a lion at Hanna's farm and lost an arm after slipping past the protective barrier while Hanna was away. Hanna settled a later lawsuit out of court, shut down the petting zoo, and moved his family to Florida. According to a family member, Matthew Ramsbottom, the boy who was attacked, never held any resentment toward Hanna, acknowledging it was an accident.

From 1973 to 1975, Hanna worked for a wildlife adventure company and directed the Central Florida Zoo and Botanical Gardens. When he was offered the position at the Columbus Zoo in 1978, one of the primary reasons he accepted was because he believed Columbus Children's Hospital had the best treatment available for his daughter Julie's leukemia. She recovered by the age of six, although she needed to have a brain tumor removed later in life. At the time he became the zoo's director, the grounds of the zoo were unkempt and the facilities run down. Hanna initially struck many as a "zealous" zoo director, often traveling around the zoo grounds after closing to personally pick up trash. He also realized the importance of increasing the profile of the Columbus Zoo in central Ohio to get more public support and funding, and the "everyman"-seeming Hanna proved to be very well-suited to public relations for the zoo. From 1981 to 1983, Hanna hosted a local television program, "Hanna's Ark", which aired on the local CBS affiliate in Columbus, WBNS. Hanna's live animal demonstrations on Good Morning America and David Letterman's talk show incarnations brought national attention to the Columbus Zoo as well as Hanna, himself. Over the course of Hanna's tenure as director, the zoo made the transition from cage-like enclosures to habitat environments, and the grounds were significantly expanded. The annual attendance of the Columbus Zoo increased by over 400% during this time. Hanna was named Director Emeritus of the Columbus Zoo and Aquarium in 1992.

Hanna published his autobiography, Monkeys on the Interstate, in 1989. He has published many books for children as well. He hosted the syndicated television shows Jack Hanna's Animal Adventures, Jack Hanna's Into the Wild, and Jack Hanna's Wild Countdown, all produced and distributed by Litton Entertainment, which has since become Hearst Media Production Group. Hanna's family sold their full interest in the Hanna television library to HMPG's parent company, Hearst Corporation in late 2023. Hanna also occasionally contributed commentary as an animal expert on various local and national news programs, and has done guest spots on other shows such as Larry King Live, Nancy Grace, Maury, The Hollywood Squares, Blue's Clues and Are You Smarter Than a 5th Grader?. He was also named one of the "50 Most Beautiful People" by People magazine in 1996. Hanna also appeared in Neal McCoy's 2005 music video for "Billy's Got His Beer Goggles On" with a hyacinth macaw, a sloth and an albino burmese python. Hanna, along with Emmy Award-winning musician Mark Frye, released an album through Virgin Records in 1996 entitled Jack Hanna's World.

He was granted honorary doctorates from Muskingum University, Otterbein College, Capital University, and Ohio University.

On October 19, 2011, Hanna assisted Ohio police in tracking down several escaped exotic animals near Zanesville, Ohio. He provided police assistance with expertise in tracking down the animals, which included lions, leopards, wolves, primates, bears, and eighteen tigers.

In May 2018 at the Los Angeles Zoo's annual Beastly Ball, Hanna received the Tom Mankiewicz Leadership Award for his work in conservation.

In June 2020, Hanna announced his retirement from the Columbus Zoo, effective at the end of the year.

== Controversies ==
=== Criticism of Copenhagen Zoo giraffe culling ===
Hanna criticized the killing of the healthy eighteen-month-old giraffe Marius in Copenhagen Zoo, which was killed rather than offered for adoption after being classified as genetically over-represented in zoo breeding programs. Hanna said this would not happen in an American zoo. Soon after, he raised money to prevent a separate male giraffe culling at the Jyllands Park Zoo, also in Denmark, where zookeepers had said they might kill the giraffe if they brought in some females for breeding. Hanna said he was willing to provide refuge including transport for the second giraffe, also named Marius. The Jyllands Park Zoo later stated that they did not plan to bring in a new female or kill the second Marius at the facility.

=== Alleged improper animal trading practices ===
On April 6, 2021, the filmmakers of an independent documentary, The Conservation Game, alleged that Columbus Zoo had misrepresented where some ambassador animals had been acquired from or transferred to, and that the zoo had been dealing with unaccredited private facilities that, in some cases, may not have provided the most appropriate animal care. The documentary alleged some animals disappearing from record, despite assurances that they were healthy and safe, though allegations were later proven not related to zoo officials but rather to vendor facilities.

Zoo officials responded to the documentary by cutting ties with most of the unaccredited private institutions named in the documentary. Former zoo official Suzi Rapp defended one of the private institutions, saying that the lack of certification of the facility does not necessarily indicate a sub-standard facility. Columbus Zoo senior vice president of animal care and conservation doctor Jan Ramler says the zoo no longer has relationships with those vendors or any vendors. “The film advocates for the passage of the Big Cat Public Safety Act now being considered in Congress,” a Zoo statement read. “The Columbus Zoo and Aquarium shares and applauds this goal.” Hanna's family released a statement saying they had not seen the documentary, could not speak for him, and could not consult him on the matter due to the effects of his dementia.

== Health ==
In 2019, Hanna was diagnosed with Alzheimer's disease. He officially retired from public life in 2021, and he and his wife, Suzi, moved to Montana. In April 2021, Hanna's family publicly announced his diagnosis, and further stated that he would make no further public appearances. His daughters stated that "his condition has progressed much faster in the last few months than any of us could have anticipated". By 2023, Hanna's Alzheimer's disease had progressed to the point where he no longer recognized most of his family members.
