= Jack Hanna's Into the Wild =

- Genre: Documentary
- Presented by: Jack Hanna
- Country of origin: United States
- Original language: English

Production
- Production locations: Columbus Zoo and Aquarium Powell, Ohio, U.S.A.

Original release
- Network: Syndication
- Release: October 1, 2007 – September 11, 2020

Related
- Jack Hanna's Animal Adventures; Jack Hanna's Wild Countdown

Jack Hanna's Into the Wild is an American television series about all different kinds of wildlife in their natural habitats. The series, which ran for 13 years from 2007 to 2020, was hosted by zoologist Jack Hanna.

It began airing as part of The CW's One Magnificent Morning block on October 5, 2019.
