= 2020–21 United States network television schedule (overnight) =

The 2020-21 network overnight television schedule for the three major English-language commercial broadcast networks in the United States covers the overnight hours from September 2020 to August 2021. The schedule is followed by a list per network of returning series, new series, and series canceled after the 2019–20 television season.

Weekend schedules are not included as none of the major networks uniformly offered any network late night programming on Friday and Saturday overnights year-round; NBC, ABC and CBS only aired overnight programming on weekdays (although NBC offered its affiliates the option of carrying same-day rebroadcasts of NBC News-produced programs Sunday–Friday, and LXTV-produced lifestyle programs on Friday and Saturday overnights; see notes below).

PBS is not included at all, as its member television stations have local flexibility over most of their schedules and broadcast times for network shows may vary. (Member stations may additionally opt to utilize the PBS Satellite Service to fill overnight airtime.) Fox, The CW and MyNetworkTV are not included because neither network/programming service offers overnight programs of any kind.

This is the last season that Ion Television existed solely as an OTA network before it converted to an internet-only FAST channel the following year after its acquisition by the E. W. Scripps Company in 2021.

== Legend ==
- Light blue indicates local programming.
- Gold indicates network news programming.
- Light teal indicates programs not applicable to the above categorizations.

== Schedule ==
- New series are highlighted in **bold**.
- All times correspond to U.S. Eastern and Pacific Time scheduling (except for some live events). Except where affiliates slot certain programs outside their network-dictated timeslots, subtract one hour for Central, Mountain, Alaska, and Hawaii–Aleutian times.
- Local schedules may differ, as affiliates have the option to pre-empt or delay network programs, and fill timeslots not allocated to network programs with local, syndicated, or paid programming at their discretion. Such scheduling may be limited to preemptions caused by local or national breaking news or weather coverage (which may force stations to tape delay certain programs in overnight timeslots or defer them to a co-operated station or a digital subchannel in their regular timeslot) and any overrunning major sports events scheduled to air in a weekday timeslot (mainly during major holidays). Stations may air shows at other times at their preference.
- NBC's overnight programming is scheduled to be pre-empted from February 4–20, 2022 due to the network's live coverage of the 2022 Winter Olympics from Beijing, China.

=== Weeknights ===
| Network | 2:00 a.m. | 2:30 a.m. | 3:00 a.m. | 3:30 a.m. | 4:00 a.m. | 4:30 a.m. | 5:00 a.m. | 5:30 a.m. | 6:00 a.m. | 6:30 a.m. |
|---|---|---|---|---|---|---|---|---|---|---|
| ABC | ABC World News Now | | | America This Morning | Local programming | | | | | |
| CBS | CBS Overnight News | | Local programming | | CBS Morning News | Local programming | | | | |
| NBC | Local programming | | Early Today | | | Local programming | | | | Early Today |

Notes:

- ABC, NBC and CBS offer their overnight and early morning newscasts via a looping feed (usually running as late as 10:00 a.m. Pacific Time) to accommodate local scheduling in the westernmost contiguous time zones or for use a filler programming for stations that do not offer a local morning newscast; some stations without a morning newscast may air syndicated or time-lease programs instead of the full newscast loop.
- NBC provides a rebroadcast of Today with Hoda & Jenna on select stations (excluding the network’s O&Os) on weekday overnights, with scheduling and local clearance varying by affiliate.
- NBC provides a 90-minute block of LXTV-produced programs (Open House, Open House NYC and 1st Look) on select NBC Stations, on Friday and Saturday overnights, scheduling varies by affiliate.
- NBC provides a rebroadcast of Meet the Press on select stations (excluding the network’s O&Os) on Sunday overnights, with scheduling and local clearance varying by affiliate.

== By network ==
=== ABC ===
Returning series:

- ABC World News Now
- America This Morning

=== CBS ===
Returning series:

- CBS Morning News
- CBS Overnight News

=== NBC ===
Returning series:

- Early Today

== See also ==
- 2020–21 United States network television schedule (prime-time)
- 2020–21 United States network television schedule (daytime)
- 2020–21 United States network television schedule (late night)
