= 2020–21 United States network television schedule (late night) =

The 2020–21 network late night television schedule for the four major English-language commercial broadcast networks in the United States covers the late night hours from September 2020 to August 2021. The schedule is followed by a list per network of returning series, new series, and series canceled after the 2019–20 television season.

PBS is not included at all, as its member television stations have local flexibility over most of their schedules and broadcast times for network shows may vary. (PBS does offer its member stations packages of Amanpour & Company and BBC World News to air in late night timeslots Monday–Friday, and optional overnight access to its satellite feed, which rebroadcasts prime time programs shown either the previous evening or earlier in the week.) MyNetworkTV and The CW are not included as neither programming service offer late night programs of any kind.

Fox is not included in the weekday schedule, as it only airs late night network programming on Saturdays, and ABC and CBS are not included in the weekend schedule as both networks only air late night network programming on weekdays. On Sundays, NBC does not offer any network late night programming year-round, outside of overruns of its prime time Sunday Night Football game telecasts into the time period during Fall.

This is the last season that Ion Television existed solely as an OTA network before it converted to an internet-only FAST channel the following year after its acquisition by the E. W. Scripps Company in 2021.

== Legend ==
- Light blue indicates local programming.
- Gray indicates encore programming.
- Yellow indicates late night talk or variety shows.
- Gold indicates network news programming.
- Light green indicates sporting events.

== Schedule ==
- New series are highlighted in **bold**.
- Repeat airings or same-day rebroadcasts are indicated by **(R)**.
- All times correspond to U.S. Eastern and Pacific Time scheduling (except for some live sports or events). Except where affiliates slot certain programs outside their network-dictated timeslots, subtract one hour for Central, Mountain, Alaska, and Hawaii–Aleutian times.
- Local schedules may differ, as affiliates have the option to pre-empt or delay network programs, and fill timeslots not allocated to network programs with local, syndicated, or paid programming at their discretion. Such scheduling may be limited to preemptions caused by local or national breaking news or weather coverage (which may force stations to tape delay certain programs in overnight timeslots or defer them to a co-operated station or a digital subchannel in their regular timeslot) and any overrunning major sports events scheduled to air in a weekday timeslot (mainly during major holidays). Stations may air shows at other times at their preference.
- All sporting events air live in all time zones in correspondence to U.S. Eastern Time scheduling; in situations in which a scheduled sporting event overruns into the late night time period (as with telecasts of ABC's Saturday Night Football during Fall and NBA Saturday Primetime during Spring, and Fox's Thursday Night Football during Fall, all of which typically ran into the 11:00 p.m. ET hour), local late-night programming started or were joined in progress on owned and affiliated stations (particularly in the Mountain, Central and Eastern Time Zones) after the game's completion.

=== Weekday late nights ===
Network		11:00 p.m.	11:30 p.m.	12:00 a.m.	12:30 a.m.	1:00 a.m.	1:37 a.m.
ABC		Local programming	Jimmy Kimmel Live! (11:35)		Nightline (12:35)	Local programming (1:06)	
CBS	Fall	Local programming	A Late Show with Stephen Colbert (11:35)		The Late Late Show with James Corden (12:37)		Local programming (1:37)
CBS	Summer	Local programming	The Late Show with Stephen Colbert (11:35)		The Late Late Show with James Corden (12:37)		Local programming (1:37)
NBC	Fall	Local programming	The Tonight Show Starring Jimmy Fallon (11:34)		Late Night with Seth Meyers (12:37)		A Little Late with Lilly Singh (1:37)†
NBC	Summer	Local programming	The Tonight Show Starring Jimmy Fallon (11:34)		Late Night with Seth Meyers (12:37)		Local programming (1:37)

Notes:

- ABC, CBS and NBC affiliates offer their rebroadcasts of the network evening newscasts to accommodate local scheduling in selecting markets that do not offer encores of the local late news; some stations that air encores of their local late newscasts will air the rebroadcast alongside the network evening news rebroadcasts (either acting as a lead-in to the networks' overnight newscasts), or with syndicated and time-lease programs.
- A Little Late with Lilly Singh ended its two-season run on June 3, with reruns continuing to air until August 13. NBC returned the weeknight 1:37 a.m. ET timeslot over to its owned-and-operated and affiliated stations on August 16, in order for them to accommodate either a rebroadcast of their late local newscasts, syndicated programming, or a network-provided rebroadcast of NBC Nightly News.

=== Saturday late nights ===
Network		11:00 p.m.	11:30 p.m.	12:00 a.m.	12:30 a.m.	1:00 a.m.	1:30 a.m.
Fox	Fall	Fox College Football	**Cosmos: Possible Worlds** (R)		Local Programming		
Fox	Late Fall	Cosmos: Possible Worlds (R)		Local Programming			
Fox	Winter	**I Can See Your Voice** (R)		Local Programming			
Fox	Spring	Name That Tune (R)		Local Programming			
Fox	Summer	**Game of Talents** (R)		Local Programming			
NBC		Local programming	Saturday Night Live			Local programming (1:02)	

Notes:

- The Fox lineup began at 11:00 p.m. Pacific /10:00 p.m. Mountain on weeks when the Fox College Football does not carry primetime games through fall and early winter.

== By network ==
=== ABC ===
Returning series:

- Jimmy Kimmel Live!
- Nightline

=== CBS ===
Returning series:

- The Late Show with Stephen Colbert
- The Late Late Show with James Corden

=== Fox ===
Returning series:

- Fox College Football
- Name That Tune (reruns)

New series:

- Cosmos: Possible Worlds (reruns)
- Game of Talents (reruns)
- I Can See Your Voice (reruns)

Not returning from 2019–20:

- Beat Shazam (reruns)
- Gordon Ramsay's 24 Hours to Hell and Back (reruns)
- Labor of Love (reruns)
- PBC on Fox
- Ultimate Tag (reruns)

=== NBC ===
Returning series:

- Late Night with Seth Meyers
- A Little Late with Lilly Singh
- Saturday Night Live
- The Tonight Show Starring Jimmy Fallon

== Renewals and cancellations ==
=== Renewals ===
==== NBC ====
- 1st Look Presents: Celebrity Sleepover—Renewed for a second season on April 28, 2021.

=== Cancellations/series endings ===
==== NBC ====
- A Little Late with Lilly Singh—Canceled on May 6, 2021, after two seasons. The series concluded on June 3, 2021.

== See also ==
- 2020–21 United States network television schedule (prime-time)
- 2020–21 United States network television schedule (daytime)
- 2020–21 United States network television schedule (overnight)
