= 2021–22 United States network television schedule (afternoon) =

American television schedule

The 2021–22 afternoon network television schedule for the four major English-language commercial broadcast networks in the United States covers the weekday and weekend afternoon hours from September 2021 to August 2022. The schedule is followed by a list per network of returning and cancelled shows from the 2020–21 season.

Affiliates fill time periods not occupied by network programs with local or syndicated programming. PBS – which offers daytime programming through a children's program block, PBS Kids – is not included, as its member television stations have local flexibility over most of their schedules and broadcast times for network shows may vary. Also not included are MyNetworkTV and The CW (as the programming services also don't offer daytime programs of any kind), and The CW Plus (as its schedule is composed mainly of syndicated reruns). Fox is not included on the weekday schedule: Fox only airs daytime programming (in the form of sports on weekend afternoons)

Effective this season, The CW turned over its weekday daytime hour to its affiliated stations on September 6, 2021; as such, The CW will not be listed in any afternoon network schedule articles from this season onward until additional national programming is added.

Beginning this season, Ion Television is completely excluded; following its acquisition by the E. W. Scripps Company in 2021, it converted to an internet-only FAST channel the following year.

== Legend ==
- Light blue indicates local programming.
- Yellow indicates talk shows.
- Chartreuse indicates soap operas.
- Blue-gray indicates news programming.
- Light green indicates sporting events.
- Light teal indicates programs not applicable to the above categorizations.
- Light yellow indicates the current schedule.

== Schedule ==
- New series are highlighted in **bold**.
- All times correspond to U.S. Eastern and Pacific Time (select shows) scheduling (except for some live sports or events). Except where affiliates slot certain programs outside their network-dictated timeslots, subtract one hour for Central, Mountain, Pacific (for selected shows), Alaska, and Hawaii-Aleutian times.
- Local schedules may differ, as affiliates have the option to pre-empt or delay network programs. Such scheduling may be limited to preemptions caused by local or national breaking news or weather coverage (which may force stations to tape delay certain programs in overnight timeslots or defer them to a co-operated station or digital subchannel in their regular timeslot) and any major sports events scheduled to air in a weekday timeslot (mainly during major holidays). Stations may air shows at other times at their preference.
- All sporting events air live in all time zones in U.S. Eastern time, with local and/or primetime programming after game completion.

=== Weekdays ===
Network	Noon	12:30 p.m.	1:00 p.m.	1:30 p.m.	2:00 p.m.	2:30 p.m.	3:00 p.m.	3:30 p.m.	4:00 p.m.	4:30 p.m.	5:00 p.m.	5:30 p.m.	6:00 p.m.	6:30 p.m.	7:00 p.m.	7:30 p.m.
ABC	Local and/or syndicated programming		GMA3: What You Need To Know		General Hospital*		Local and/or syndicated programming							ABC World News Tonight with David Muir	Local and/or syndicated programming	
CBS	Local and/or syndicated programming	The Young and the Restless		The Bold and the Beautiful	The Talk		Local and/or syndicated programming							CBS Evening News with Norah O'Donnell	Local and/or syndicated programming	
NBC	Local and/or syndicated programming		Days of Our Lives		Local and/or syndicated programming									NBC Nightly News with Lester Holt	Local and/or syndicated programming	

Notes:

- ABC stations have the option of airing General Hospital at 2:00 or 3:00 p.m. Eastern Time, depending on the station's choice of feed.
- Depending on their choice of feed, CBS stations have the option of airing Let's Make a Deal at either 10:00 a.m. or 3:00 p.m. Eastern (airtime adjusted by time zone), and/or The Young and the Restless at 11:00 or 11:30 a.m. local time (in the Central, Mountain, and Pacific time zones).
- NBC stations have the option of airing Days of Our Lives at varying airtimes (usually between Noon and 2:00 p.m. local time), depending on the station's preference and choice of feed.
- Fox aired Fox NFL Thursday on Thursdays at 7:30 p.m. ET live in all time zones during the fall.
- ABC, CBS and/or NBC stations may air their corresponding network's early evening newscast anytime between 6:00- 8:00 p.m. ET and PT/5:00-7:00 p.m. CT/MT, depending on the station's choice of feed.

=== Saturday ===
Network		Noon	12:30 p.m.	1:00 p.m.	1:30 p.m.	2:00 p.m.	2:30 p.m.	3:00 p.m.	3:30 p.m.	4:00 p.m.	4:30 p.m.	5:00 p.m.	5:30 p.m.	6:00 p.m.	6:30 p.m.	7:00 p.m.	7:30 p.m.
ABC	Fall	ESPN College Football on ABC														College Football Scoreboard	Saturday Night Football (continued to game completion)
ABC	Winter	Local, syndicated and/or ESPN on ABC sports programming				UFC Live		NHL on ABC						Local and/or syndicated programming	ABC World News Tonight with Whit Johnson	Local and/or syndicated programming	
ABC	Spring	Local, syndicated and/or ESPN on ABC sports programming				World of X Games		WNBA on ABC				Local and/or syndicated programming			ABC World News Tonight with Whit Johnson	Local and/or syndicated programming	
ABC	Summer	WNBA on ABC						MLS on ABC					Local and/or syndicated programming		ABC World News Tonight with Whit Johnson	Local and/or syndicated programming	
CBS	Fall	Local, syndicated and/or CBS Sports programming						College Football Today	SEC on CBS					Local and/or syndicated programming	CBS Weekend News	Local and/or syndicated programming	
CBS	Winter	College Basketball on CBS												Local and/or syndicated programming	CBS Weekend News	Local and/or syndicated programming	
CBS	Spring	Local, syndicated and/or CBS Sports programming						PGA Tour on CBS						Local and/or syndicated programming	CBS Weekend News	Local and/or syndicated programming	
CBS	Summer	Local and/or syndicated programming		Big 3 on CBS				PGA Tour on CBS						Local and/or syndicated programming	CBS Weekend News	Local and/or syndicated programming	
Fox	Fall	Fox College Football (continued to game completion)															
Fox	Winter	Fox College Hoops														Local and/or syndicated programming	
Fox	Spring	Local, Syndicated and/or Fox Sports programming						**USFL on Fox**						Local and/or syndicated programming		Fox Major League Baseball (continued to game completion)	
Fox	Summer	Local, syndicated and/or Fox Sports programming														Fox Major League Baseball (continued to game completion)	
NBC	Fall	Local and/or syndicated programming	Premier League on NBC				Notre Dame Football on NBC							Local and/or syndicated programming	NBC Nightly News with Jose-Diaz Balart	Local and/or syndicated programming	
NBC	Winter	Local and/or syndicated programming	Premier League on NBC				Premier League Goal Zone	Golf Channel on NBC						Local and/or syndicated programming	NBC Nightly News with Jose-Diaz Balart	Local and/or syndicated programming	
NBC	Spring	Local and/or syndicated programming	Premier League on NBC				Premier League Goal Zone	Monster Energy Supercross on NBC						Local and/or syndicated programming	NBC Nightly News with Jose-Diaz Balart	Local and/or syndicated programming	
NBC	Summer	Local, Snydicated and/or NBC Sports programming													NBC Nightly News with Jose-Diaz Balart	Local and/or syndicated programming	

Notes:

- To comply with FCC educational programming regulations, stations may defer certain programs featured in their respective network's E/I program blocks to determined weekend late morning or afternoon time periods if a sporting event is not scheduled in the timeslot or in place of paid programming that would otherwise be scheduled.
- NBC Nightly News with Jose-Diaz Balart is preempted in the Eastern and Central Time zones when Notre Dame Football on NBC airs a 3:30 p.m. ET game, all other time zones air the program or sometimes may be preempted for other sporting events scheduled to air in the Afternoon (primetime in the Eastern and Central Time zones).
- CBS Weekend News is preempted in the Eastern and Central time zones when SEC on CBS airs a 3:30 pm ET game, all other time zones air the program.
- ABC, CBS and/or NBC stations may air their corresponding network's early evening newscast anytime between 6:00- 8:00 p.m. ET and PT/5:00-7:00 p.m. CT/MT, depending on the station's choice of feed.

=== Sunday ===
Network		Noon	12:30 p.m.	1:00 p.m.	1:30 p.m.	2:00 p.m.	2:30 p.m.	3:00 p.m.	3:30 p.m.	4:00 p.m.	4:30 p.m.	5:00 p.m.	5:30 p.m.	6:00 p.m.	6:30 p.m.
ABC	Fall	Local, Syndicated And/or ESPN on ABC sports programming						WNBA on ABC				Local and/or syndicated programming			ABC World News Tonight with Linsey Davis
ABC	Winter	Local and/or syndicated programming	NBA Countdown	NBA Sunday Showcase										Local and/or syndicated programming	ABC World News Tonight with Linsey Davis
ABC	Spring	Local and/or syndicated programming	NBA Countdown	NBA Playoffs on ABC										Local and/or syndicated programming	ABC World News Tonight with Linsey Davis
ABC	Summer	Local, Syndicated and/or ESPN on ABC sports programming						MLS on ABC					Local and/or syndicated programming		ABC World News Tonight with Linsey Davis
CBS	Fall	The NFL Today		NFL on CBS (continued until game completion)											
CBS	Winter	College Basketball on CBS												Local and/or syndicated programming	CBS Weekend News
CBS	Spring	Local, Syndicated and/or CBS Sports programming						PGA Tour on CBS						Local and/or syndicated programming	CBS Weekend News
CBS	Summer	Local, Syndicated and/or CBS Sports programming						Big 3 on CBS						Local and/or syndicated programming	CBS Weekend News
Fox	Fall	Fox NFL Sunday		Fox NFL (continued to game completion)											
Fox	Winter	Fox Sports programming						NASCAR on Fox							
Fox	Spring	Local, syndicated and/or Fox Sports programming													
Fox	Summer	Local, Syndicated and/or Fox Sports programming						NHRA on Fox							
NBC	Fall	Local and/or syndicated programming		NASCAR America		NASCAR on NBC								Local and/or syndicated programming	NBC Nightly News with Kate Snow
NBC	Winter	NBC Sports programming						Golf Channel on NBC						Local and/or syndicated programming	NBC Nightly News with Kate Snow
NBC	Spring	IndyCar Series on NBC						**USFL on NBC**						Local and/or syndicated programming	NBC Nightly News with Kate Snow
NBC	Summer	Local, syndicated and/or NBC Sports programming													NBC Nightly News with Kate Snow

Notes:

- To comply with FCC educational programming regulations, stations may defer certain programs featured in their respective network's E/I program blocks to determined weekend late morning or afternoon time periods if a sporting event is not scheduled in the timeslot or in place of paid programming that would otherwise be scheduled.
- Airtimes of sporting events may vary depending on the offerings scheduled for that weekend.
- When CBS and/or Fox offer an early singleheader NFL game, a post-game show airs after the game from 4:30–5:00 p.m. ET (the length of which may vary depending on the timing of the early game's conclusion) with local, syndicated or non-NFL sports programming airing after from 5:00–7:00 p.m. ET. Meanwhile, when CBS and/or Fox offer a late singleheader NFL game, local, syndicated or non-NFL sports programming airs from 1:00–4:00 p.m. ET/10:00 a.m.–1:00 p.m. PT.
- CBS and Fox stations in the Pacific Time Zone receiving an NFL singleheader game must air a late singleheader game, if possible.
- ABC, CBS and/or NBC stations may air their corresponding network's early evening newscast at 6:00 or 6:30 p.m. ET and PT/5:00 or 5:30 p.m. CT/MT, depending on the station's choice of feed.
- NBC Nightly News with Kate Snow airs live in all time zones during Fall to avoid pre-emption due to the live airing of NBC Sunday Night Football.
- ABC World News with Linsey Davis airs live in all time zones during Spring to avoid pre-emption due to the live airing of American Idol.
- CBS Weekend News is preempted on the Eastern and Central time zones when NFL on CBS airs late NFL Games, all other time zones air the program.

== By network ==
=== ABC ===
Returning series:

- ABC News
  - ABC World News Tonight
  - GMA3: What You Need To Know
- ESPN on ABC
  - College Football Scoreboard
  - ESPN College Basketball on ABC
  - ESPN College Football on ABC
  - NBA Countdown
  - NBA Sunday Showcase
  - NHL on ABC (Note: Third revival on ABC and second contractually shared with ESPN; previously aired on ABC from 1992–94 under a time-buy agreement, and from 1999–2004.)
  - WNBA on ABC
- General Hospital
- The View

=== CBS ===
Returning series:

- The Bold and the Beautiful
- CBS Evening News
- CBS Sports
  - College Basketball on CBS
  - The NFL Today
  - NFL on CBS
  - PGA Tour on CBS
  - SEC on CBS/College Football on CBS
- The Talk
- The Young and the Restless

=== The CW ===
New series:

- None, due to The CW's decision to air syndicated programming only

Not returning from 2020–21:

- The Jerry Springer Show (reruns)

=== Fox ===
Returning series:

- Fox Sports
  - Fox College Football
  - Fox College Hoops
  - Fox NFL Sunday
  - NASCAR on Fox
  - NASCAR RaceDay

=== NBC ===
Returning series:

- Days of Our Lives
- NBC Nightly News
- NBC Sports
  - Golf Channel on NBC
  - IndyCar on NBC
  - NASCAR America
  - NASCAR on NBC
  - Notre Dame Football on NBC
  - Premier League on NBC

Not returning from 2020–21:

- NBC Sports
  - NHL on NBC

== Renewals and cancellations ==
=== Series renewals ===
==== ABC ====
- NHL on ABC—Renewed for a ninth season on March 10, 2021; deal will into a fourteenth season in 2027.

==== CBS ====
- The Bold and the Beautiful—Renewed through the 2023–24 season on March 2, 2022.
- College Basketball on CBS—Renewed through the 2022–23 season on July 24, 2017.
- NFL on CBS—Renewed through the 2032–33 season on March 18, 2021.
- SEC on CBS—Renewed for a twenty-seventh season; deal will conclude with its twenty-ninth season in 2023.
- The Talk—Renewed for a thirteenth season on April 18, 2022.
- The Young and the Restless—Renewed through the 2023–24 season on January 30, 2020.

==== Fox ====
- Fox College Football—Renewed through the 2022–23 season on July 24, 2017.
- Fox NFL Sunday—Renewed through the 2032–33 season on March 18, 2021.
- NASCAR on Fox—Renewed through the 2023–24 season on August 2, 2013.

==== NBC ====
- Days of Our Lives—Renewed through the 2022–23 season on May 11, 2021. On August 3, 2022, it was announced that the series would be moving to Peacock.

== See also ==
- 2021–22 United States network television schedule (prime-time)
- 2021–22 United States network television schedule (morning)
- 2021–22 United States network television schedule (late night)
- 2021–22 United States network television schedule (overnight)

== Sources ==
- Curt Alliaume. "ABC Daytime Schedule". Curt Alliaume's Utterly Irrelevant Web Site. Archived from the original on October 15, 2007.
- Curt Alliaume. "CBS Daytime Schedule". Curt Alliaume's Utterly Irrelevant Web Site. Archived from the original on October 15, 2007.
- Curt Alliaume. "NBC Daytime Schedule". Curt Alliaume's Utterly Irrelevant Web Site. Archived from the original on October 12, 2007.
