= 2021–22 United States network television schedule (morning) =

The 2021–22 morning network television schedule for the five major English-language commercial broadcast networks in the United States covers the weekday and weekend morning hours from September 2021 to August 2022. The schedule is followed by a list per network of returning and cancelled shows from the 2020–21 season. The daytime schedules for the five major networks that offer morning programming are expected to remain consistent with the prior television season.

Affiliates fill time periods not occupied by network programs with local or syndicated programming. PBS – which offers daytime programming through a children's program block, PBS Kids – is not included, as its member television stations have local flexibility over most of their schedules and broadcast times for network shows may vary. Also not included are MyNetworkTV (as the programming service also does not offer daytime programs of any kind), and The CW Plus (as its schedule is composed mainly of syndicated reruns).

Fox doesn’t provide network programming on weekday mornings, therefore are not included in the schedule, The CW however doesn’t provide network programming on weekday and Sunday mornings, therefore are not included in the schedule. On Saturday mornings, all of the networks lease the time to outside producers to produce programming to fulfill E/I programming obligations as mandated by the FCC.

Beginning this season, Ion Television is completely excluded; following its acquisition by the E. W. Scripps Company in 2021, it converted to an internet-only FAST channel the following year.

== Legend ==
- Light blue indicates local programming.
- Yellow indicates talk shows.
- Pink indicates game shows.
- Blue-gray indicates news programming.
- Gold indicates public affairs programming.
- Light green indicates sporting events.
- Light purple indicates children's and/or E/I-compliant programming.
- Light teal indicates programs not applicable to the above categorizations.
- Light yellow indicates the current schedule.

== Schedule ==
- New series are highlighted in **bold**.
- All times correspond to U.S. Eastern and Pacific Time (select shows) scheduling (except for some live sports or events). Except where affiliates slot certain programs outside their network-dictated timeslots and The CW which airs its programming block at the same time in all time zones, subtract one hour for Central, Mountain, Pacific (for selected shows), Alaska, and Hawaii-Aleutian times.
- Local schedules may differ, as affiliates have the option to pre-empt or delay network programs. Such scheduling may be limited to preemptions caused by local or national breaking news or weather coverage (which may force stations to tape delay certain programs in overnight timeslots or defer them to a co-operated station or digital subchannel in their regular timeslot) and any major sports events scheduled to air in a weekday timeslot (mainly during major holidays). Stations may air shows at other times at their preference.
- All sporting events air live in all time zones in U.S. Eastern time, with local and/or afternoon programming after game completion.

=== Weekdays ===
Network	7:00 a.m.	7:30 a.m.	8:00 a.m.	8:30 a.m.	9:00 a.m.	9:30 a.m.	10:00 a.m.	10:30 a.m.	11:00 a.m.	11:30 a.m.
ABC	Good Morning America				Local and/or syndicated programming				The View	
CBS	**CBS Mornings**				Local and/or syndicated programming		Let's Make a Deal		The Price Is Right	
NBC	Today				Today Third Hour		Today with Hoda & Jenna		Local and/or syndicated programming	

Notes:

- Depending on their choice of feed, CBS stations have the option of airing Let's Make a Deal at either 10:00 a.m. or 3:00 p.m. Eastern (airtime adjusted by time zone)

=== Saturday ===
Network		7:00 a.m.	7:30 a.m.	8:00 a.m.	8:30 a.m.	9:00 a.m.	9:30 a.m.	10:00 a.m.	10:30 a.m.	11:00 a.m.	11:30 a.m.
ABC		Good Morning America				**Wildlife Nation With Jeff Corwin**	Hearts of Heroes		Free Enterprise	Oh Baby! with Anji Corley	Outback Adventures (R)
CBS		**CBS Saturday Morning**				The Henry Ford's Innovation Nation	Mission Unstoppable	Hope in the Wild	Pet Vet Dream Team	All In with Laila Ali (R)	Lucky Dog
The CW		Local and/or syndicated programming		Jack Hanna's Into the Wild				The Open Road with Dr. Chris (R)	Ready, Set, Pet (R)	Local and/or syndicated programming	
Fox	Fall	Life 2.0	**Sci Q**	Xploration DIY Sci	Xploration Outer Space	Xploration Awesome Planet	**Second Chance Pets**	Big Noon Kickoff			
Fox	Winter	Life 2.0	**Sci Q**	Xploration DIY Sci	Xploration Outer Space	Xploration Awesome Planet	**Second Chance Pets**	Local and/or syndicated programming			Fox College Hoops Tip Off
Fox	Spring	Life 2.0	**Sci Q**	Xploration DIY Sci	Xploration Outer Space	Xploration Awesome Planet	**Second Chance Pets**	Local and/or syndicated programming			
NBC	Fall	Today			Local and/or syndicated programming	Vets Saving Pets	The Voyager with Josh Garcia (R)	Earth Odyssey With Dylan Dreyer	Roots Less Traveled	Wild Child	One Team: The Power of Sports
NBC	Spring	Today			Local and/or syndicated programming	Vets Saving Pets	The Voyager with Josh Garcia (R)	Earth Odyssey With Dylan Dreyer		Wild Child	One Team: The Power of Sports

Notes:

- To comply with FCC educational programming regulations, stations may defer certain programs featured in their respective network's E/I program blocks to determined weekend late morning or afternoon time periods if a sporting event is not scheduled in the timeslot or in place of paid programming that would otherwise be scheduled.
- Airtimes of sporting events and, on NBC, the Saturday edition of Today may vary depending on the offerings scheduled for that weekend. (Fox and/or NBC may air sports programming on Saturday mornings; NBC may preempt or abbreviate the length of Today to accommodate sports programming airing that day, forcing its stations to air some of the network's E/I-compliant programs in other open weekend time slots to fulfill educational content obligations.)

=== Sunday ===
Network		7:00 a.m.	7:30 a.m.	8:00 a.m.	8:30 a.m.	9:00 a.m.	9:30 a.m.	10:00 a.m.	10:30 a.m.	11:00 a.m.	11:30 a.m.
ABC		Good Morning America		Local and/or syndicated programming		This Week with George Stephanopoulos		Local and/or syndicated programming			
CBS		Local and/or syndicated programming				CBS Sunday Morning			Face the Nation		Local and/or syndicated programming
Fox	Fall	Local and/or syndicated programming				Fox News Sunday		Local and/or syndicated programming		Fox NFL Kickoff	
Fox	Winter	Local and/or syndicated programming				Fox News Sunday		Local and/or syndicated programming			
NBC		Sunday Today with Willie Geist		Local and/or syndicated programming		Meet the Press		Local and/or syndicated programming			

Notes:

- Airtimes of sporting events may vary depending on the offerings scheduled for that weekend.

== By network ==
=== ABC ===
Returning series:

- ABC News
  - Good Morning America
  - This Week with George Stephanopoulos
- Litton's Weekend Adventure / Weekend Adventure
  - Free Enterprise
  - Hearts of Heroes (shared with Go Time)
  - Oh Baby! with Anji Corley
  - Outback Adventures (reruns)
- The View

New series:

- Litton's Weekend Adventure / Weekend Adventure
  - Wildlife Nation with Jeff Corwin

Not returning from 2020–21:

- Litton's Weekend Adventure
  - Ocean Treks with Jeff Corwin
  - Rock the Park (moved to Go Time)
  - Sea Rescue

=== CBS ===
Returning series:

- CBS Dream Team
  - All In with Laila Ali (reruns)
  - The Henry Ford's Innovation Nation
  - Hope in the Wild
  - Lucky Dog
  - Mission Unstoppable
  - Pet Vet Dream Team
- CBS News
  - CBS Sunday Morning
  - Face the Nation
- Let's Make a Deal
- The Price Is Right

New series:

- CBS News
  - CBS Mornings
  - CBS Saturday Morning

Not returning from 2020–21:

- CBS News
  - CBS This Morning
  - CBS This Morning Saturday

=== The CW ===
Returning series:

- One Magnificent Morning
  - Jack Hanna's Into the Wild
  - Ready, Set, Pet (reruns) (Note: The series was previously aired on One Magnificent Morning from 2018-19 and aired repeats throughout this season.)

New series:

- One Magnificent Morning
  - The Open Road with Dr. Chris (moved from CBS Dream Team)

Not returning from 2020–21:

- One Magnificent Morning
  - Jewels of the Natural World (moved to Go Time in First-run syndication)
  - Tails of Valor
  - This Old House: Trade School

=== Fox ===
Returning series:

- Fox News Sunday
- Fox Sports
  - Big Noon Kickoff
  - Fox NFL Kickoff
- Xploration Station
  - Xploration DIY Sci
  - Life 2.0 (retitled from Xploration Life 2.0)
  - Xploration Awesome Planet
  - Xploration Outer Space

New series:

- Xploration Station
  - Sci Q
  - Second Chance Pets

Not returning from 2020–21:

- Xploration Station
  - Xploration Nature Knows Best
  - Xploration Weird But True

=== NBC ===
Returning series:

- The More You Know
  - Earth Odyssey With Dylan Dreyer
  - One Team: The Power of Sports
  - Vets Saving Pets
  - The Voyager with Josh Garcia (reruns) (Note: The series was previously aired on The More You Know from 2016–19 and aired repeats throughout this season.)
  - Wild Child
- NBC News
  - Meet the Press
  - Today
    - Today Third Hour
    - Today with Hoda & Jenna
    - Sunday Today with Willie Geist

Not returning from 2020–21:

- The More You Know
  - A New Leaf
  - The Champion Within with Lauren Thompson

== See also ==
- 2021–22 United States network television schedule (prime-time)
- 2021–22 United States network television schedule (afternoon)
- 2021–22 United States network television schedule (late night)
- 2021–22 United States network television schedule (overnight)
