= 2019–20 United States network television schedule (late night) =

The 2019–20 network late night television schedule for the four of the five major English-language commercial broadcast networks in the United States covers the late night hours from September 2019 to August 2020. The schedule is followed by a list per network of returning series, new series, and series canceled after the 2018–19 television season.

PBS is not included, as member television stations have local flexibility over most of their schedules and broadcast times for network shows may vary, Ion Television is not included since the network schedules feature syndicated reruns, also not included are The CW, The CW Plus, and MyNetworkTV (as the networks/programming services do not offer late night programs of any kind).

Fox is not included on the weekday schedule as Fox airs late night network programming only on Saturdays.

== Legend ==
- Light blue indicates Local programming.
- Gray indicates encore programming.
- Light green indicates live sporting events.
- Yellow indicates late night talk or variety shows.
- Gold indicates network news programming.

== Schedule ==
- New series are highlighted in **bold**.
- Repeat airings or same-day rebroadcasts are indicated by **(R)**.
- All times correspond to U.S. Eastern and Pacific Time scheduling (except for some live sports or events). Except where affiliates slot certain programs outside their network-dictated timeslots, subtract one hour for Central, Mountain, Alaska, and Hawaii–Aleutian times.
- Local schedules may differ, as affiliates have the option to pre-empt or delay network programs, and fill timeslots not allocated to network programs with local, syndicated, or paid programming at their discretion. Such scheduling may be limited to preemptions caused by local or national breaking news or weather coverage (which may force stations to tape delay certain programs in overnight timeslots or defer them to a co-operated station or a digital subchannel in their regular timeslot) and any overrunning major sports events scheduled to air in a weekday timeslot (mainly during major holidays). Stations may air shows at other times at their preference.
- All sporting events air live in all time zones in correspondence to U.S. Eastern Time scheduling; in situations in which a scheduled sporting event overruns into the late night time period (as with telecasts of NBC Sunday Night Football during Fall, ABC’s Saturday Night Football during Fall and NBA Saturday Primetime during Spring, and Fox’s Thursday Night Football during Fall, all of which typically ran into the 11:00 p.m. ET hour), local late-night programming will start or be joined in progress on owned and affiliated stations (particularly in the Mountain, Central and Eastern Time Zones) after the game’s completion.

=== Sunday–Friday overnights ===
| Network | | 11:00 pm | 11:30 pm | 12:00 am | 12:30 am | 1:00 am | 1:37/1:38 am | 2:00 am | 2:30 am | 3:00 am | 3:30 am | 4:00 am | 4:30 am | 5:00 am | 5:30 am | 6:00 am | 6:30 am |
|---|---|---|---|---|---|---|---|---|---|---|---|---|---|---|---|---|---|
| ABC | Fall | Local programming | Jimmy Kimmel Live! (Mon.–Fri.; 11:35) | | Nightline (Mon.–Fri.; 12:35) | Local programming | | ABC World News Now | | | | America This Morning | Local programming | | | | |
| ABC | Spring | Local programming | Nightline (Mon.–Fri.; 11:35) | Jimmy Kimmel Live! (R) (Mon.–Fri.; 12:05) | | Local programming | | ABC World News Now | | | | America This Morning | Local programming | | | | |
| ABC | Summer | Local programming | Jimmy Kimmel Live! (Mon.–Fri.; 11:35) | Nightline (Mon.–Fri.; 12:05) | Jimmy Kimmel Live! (R) (Mon.–Fri.; 12:35) | Local programming | | ABC World News Now | | | | America This Morning | Local programming | | | | |
| CBS | Fall | Local programming | The Late Show with Stephen Colbert (Mon.–Fri.; 11:35) | | The Late Late Show with James Corden (Mon.–Fri.; 12:35) | | Local programming | CBS Overnight News | | | | CBS Morning News | Local programming | | | | |
| CBS | Spring | Local programming | A Late Show with Stephen Colbert (Mon.–Fri.; 11:35) | | The Late Late Show with James Corden From His Garage (Mon.–Fri.; 12:35) | | Local programming | CBS Overnight News | | | | CBS Morning News | Local programming | | | | |
| NBC | Fall | Local programming | The Tonight Show Starring Jimmy Fallon (Mon.–Fri.; 11:34) | | Late Night with Seth Meyers (Mon.–Fri.; 12:37) | | Meet the Press (R) (Sun.; 1:37–2:37)† / **A Little Late with Lilly Singh** (Mon.–Fri.; 1:38) | Today with Hoda & Jenna (R) (Mon.–Fri.; 2:07)† | | Early Today | | | Local programming | | | | |
| NBC | Spring | Local programming | The Tonight Show Starring Jimmy Fallon: At Home Edition (Mon.–Fri.; 11:34) | | Late Night with Seth Meyers (Mon.–Fri.; 12:37) | | Meet the Press (R) (Sun.; 1:37–2:37)† / **A Little Late with Lilly Singh** (Mon.–Fri.; 1:38) | Today with Hoda & Jenna (R) (Mon.–Fri.; 2:07)† | | Early Today | | | Local programming | | | | |
| NBC | Summer | Local programming | The Tonight Show Starring Jimmy Fallon (Mon.–Fri.; 11:34) | | Late Night with Seth Meyers (Mon.–Fri.; 12:37) | | Meet the Press (R) (Sun.; 1:37–2:37)† / **A Little Late with Lilly Singh** (Mon.–Fri.; 1:38) | Today with Hoda & Jenna (R) (Mon.–Fri.; 2:07)† | | Early Today | | | Local programming | | | | |

Notes:

- Early morning newscasts air Sunday–Thursday overnights; late night talk shows air Monday–Friday overnights.
- ABC, CBS and NBC affiliates offer their rebroadcasts of the network evening newscasts to accommodate local scheduling in selecting markets that do not offer encores of the local late news; some stations that air encores of their local late newscasts will air the rebroadcast alongside the network evening news rebroadcasts (either acting as a lead-in to the networks' overnight newscasts), or with syndicated and time-lease programs.
- ABC, NBC and CBS offer their early morning newscasts via a looping feed (usually running as late as 10:00 a.m. Pacific Time) to accommodate local scheduling in the westernmost contiguous time zones or for use a filler programming for stations that do not offer a local morning newscast; some stations without a morning newscast may air syndicated or time-lease programs instead of the full newscast loop.
- † The late-night rebroadcasts of Today with Hoda & Jenna (Mon.–Fri.) and Meet the Press (Sun.) are not cleared by NBC’s owned-and-operated stations, which air rebroadcasts of local and syndicated daytime programs, paid or additional syndicated programming in their place; NBC distributes the overnight fourth-hour Today and Meet the Press rebroadcasts to its affiliated stations for clearance at their discretion.

=== Saturday overnights ===
| Network | | 11:00 p.m. | 11:30 p.m. | 12:00 a.m. | 12:30 a.m. | 1:00 a.m. | 1:30 a.m. | 2:00 a.m. | 2:30 a.m. | 3:00 a.m. | 3:30 a.m. | 4:00 a.m. | 4:30 a.m. | 5:00 a.m. | 5:30 a.m. | 6:00 a.m. | 6:30 a.m. |
|---|---|---|---|---|---|---|---|---|---|---|---|---|---|---|---|---|---|
| Fox | Fall | Beat Shazam (R) | | Local programming | | | | | | | | | | | | | |
| Fox | Late fall | PBC on Fox | | Local programming | | | | | | | | | | | | | |
| Fox | Early winter | Gordon Ramsay's 24 Hours to Hell and Back (R) | | Local programming | | | | | | | | | | | | | |
| Fox | Winter | Beat Shazam (R) | | Local programming | | | | | | | | | | | | | |
| Fox | Spring | **Ultimate Tag** (R) | | Local programming | | | | | | | | | | | | | |
| Fox | Summer | **Labor of Love** (R) | | Local programming | | | | | | | | | | | | | |
| NBC | | Local programming | Saturday Night Live | | | Local programming (1:02) | | | | | | | | | | | |

Notes:

- NBC also provides a 90-minute block of LXTV-produced programs (Open House, Open House NYC and 1st Look) on Saturday overnights, following Saturday Night Live; scheduling varies by affiliate.
- The Fox lineup began at 11:30 p.m. Eastern and Pacific / 10:30 p.m. Central and Mountain on weeks when the Fox College Football carries primetime games through fall and early winter.

== By network ==
=== ABC ===
Returning series

- ABC World News Now
- Jimmy Kimmel Live!
- Nightline

=== CBS ===
Returning series

- CBS Overnight News
- The Late Show with Stephen Colbert
- The Late Late Show with James Corden

=== Fox ===
Returning series:

- Beat Shazam (reruns)
- Gordon Ramsay's 24 Hours to Hell and Back (reruns)

New series:

- Labor of Love (reruns)
- PBC on Fox
- Ultimate Tag (reruns)

Not returning from 2018-19

- Hell's Kitchen (reruns)
- MasterChef Junior (reruns)

=== NBC ===
Returning series

- Late Night with Seth Meyers
- Saturday Night Live
- The Tonight Show Starring Jimmy Fallon

New series

- A Little Late with Lilly Singh

Not returning from 2018–19:

- Last Call with Carson Daly
- Today With Kathie Lee and Hoda (reruns)
