= 2018–19 United States network television schedule (late night) =

These are the late night schedules for the four United States broadcast networks that offer programming during this time period, starting September 2018. All times are Eastern or Pacific. Affiliates will fill non-network schedule with local, syndicated, or paid programming. Affiliates also have the option to preempt or delay network programming at their discretion.

Legend
- Light blue indicates Local programming.
- Gray indicates encore programming.
- Yellow indicates late night talk or variety shows.
- Gold indicates network news programming.

== Schedule ==
- New series are highlighted in **bold**.
- All times correspond to U.S. Eastern and Pacific Time scheduling (except for some live sports or events). Except where affiliates slot certain programs outside their network-dictated timeslots, subtract one hour for Central, Mountain, Alaska, and Hawaii–Aleutian times.
- Local schedules may differ, as affiliates have the option to pre-empt or delay network programs, and fill timeslots not allocated to network programs with local, syndicated, or paid programming at their discretion. Such scheduling may be limited to preemptions caused by local or national breaking news or weather coverage (which may force stations to tape delay certain programs in overnight timeslots or defer them to a co-operated station or a digital subchannel in their regular timeslot) and any overrunning major sports events scheduled to air in a weekday timeslot (mainly during major holidays). Stations may air shows at other times at their preference.
- All sporting events air live in all time zones in correspondence to U.S. Eastern Time scheduling; in situations in which a scheduled sporting event overruns into the late night time period (as with telecasts of NBC Sunday Night Football during Fall, ABC’s Saturday Night Football during Fall and NBA Saturday Primetime during Spring, and Fox’s Thursday Night Football during Fall, all of which typically ran into the 11:00 p.m. ET hour), local late-night programming will start or be joined in progress on owned and affiliated stations (particularly in the Mountain, Central and Eastern Time Zones) after the game’s completion.

=== Sunday–Friday overnights ===
Network		11:00 pm	11:30 pm	12:00 am	12:30 am	1:00 am	1:37/1:38 am	2:00 am	2:30 am	3:00 am	3:30 am	4:00 am	4:30 am	5:00 am	5:30 am	6:00 am	6:30 am
ABC		Local programming	Jimmy Kimmel Live! (Mon.–Fri.; 11:35)		Nightline (Mon.–Fri.; 12:35)	Local programming		ABC World News Now				America This Morning	Local programming				
CBS		Local programming	The Late Show with Stephen Colbert (Mon.–Fri.; 11:35)		The Late Late Show with James Corden (Mon.–Fri.; 12:35)		Local programming	CBS Overnight News				CBS Morning News	Local programming				
NBC	Fall	Local programming	The Tonight Show Starring Jimmy Fallon (Mon.–Fri.; 11:34)		Late Night with Seth Meyers (Mon.–Fri.; 12:37)		Meet the Press (R) (Sun.; 1:37–2:37)† / Last Call with Carson Daly (Mon.–Fri.; 1:38)	Today with Kathie Lee & Hoda (R) (Mon.–Fri.; 2:07)		Early Today			Local programming				
NBC	Spring	Local programming	The Tonight Show Starring Jimmy Fallon (Mon.–Fri.; 11:34)		Late Night with Seth Meyers (Mon.–Fri.; 12:37)		Meet the Press (R) (Sun.; 1:37–2:37)† / Last Call with Carson Daly (Mon.–Fri.; 1:38)	Today with Hoda & Jenna (R) (Mon.–Fri.; 2:07)		Early Today			Local programming				

Notes:

- Early morning newscasts air Sunday–Thursday overnights; late night talk shows air Monday–Friday overnights.
- ABC, CBS and NBC affiliates offer their rebroadcasts of the network evening newscasts to accommodate local scheduling in selecting markets that do not offer encores of the local late news; some stations with encores of local late news will air alongside the network evening news rebroadcasts leading in to the networks' overnight newscasts, or with syndicated and time-lease programs.
- ABC, NBC and CBS offer their early morning newscasts via a looping feed (usually running as late as 10:00 a.m. Pacific Time) to accommodate local scheduling in the westernmost contiguous time zones or for use a filler programming for stations that do not offer a local morning newscast; some stations without a morning newscast may air syndicated or time-lease programs instead of the full newscast loop.
- In April 2019, Today with Kathie Lee and Hoda was renamed Today with Hoda and Jenna due to the departure of longtime co-host Kathie Lee Gifford and her subsequent replacement by Jenna Bush Hager. On April 8, 2019, NBC owned-and-operated stations began repurposing the 2:07 a.m. ET slot for local news rebroadcasts and syndicated programs; the network continues to offer a rebroadcast of the fourth hour of Today in that time slot, which is carried at the affiliate's discretion.
- Last Call with Carson Daly aired its last episode on May 24, 2019, with reruns continuing to air on NBC until September 13, 2019.

=== Saturday overnights ===
Network		11:00 p.m.	11:30 p.m.	12:00 a.m.	12:30 a.m.	1:00 a.m.	1:30 a.m.	2:00 a.m.	2:30 a.m.	3:00 a.m.	3:30 a.m.	4:00 a.m.	4:30 a.m.	5:00 a.m.	5:30 a.m.	6:00 a.m.	6:30 a.m.
NBC		Local programming	Saturday Night Live (11:29)			Local programming (1:02)											
Fox	Fall	Hell's Kitchen (R)		Local programming													
Fox	Winter	Gordon Ramsay's 24 Hours to Hell and Back (R)		Local programming													
Fox	Spring	MasterChef Junior (R)		Local programming													

Notes:

- NBC also provides a 90-minute block of LXTV-produced programs (Open House, Open House NYC and 1st Look) on Saturday overnights, following Saturday Night Live; scheduling varies by affiliate.
- The Fox lineup began at 11:30 p.m. Eastern/10:30 p.m. Central on weeks when the Fox College Football carries primetime games through fall and early winter. Mountain and Pacific Time Zone start times will remain as shown on said weeks.

== By network ==
=== ABC ===
Returning series

- ABC World News Now
- Jimmy Kimmel Live!
- Nightline

=== CBS ===
Returning series

- CBS Overnight News
- The Late Show with Stephen Colbert
- The Late Late Show with James Corden

=== Fox ===
Returning series

- Hell's Kitchen (reruns)
- Gordon Ramsay's 24 Hours to Hell and Back (reruns)
- MasterChef Junior (reruns)

Not Returning from 2017-18

- Encore Programming

=== NBC ===
Returning series

- Last Call with Carson Daly
- Late Night with Seth Meyers
- Saturday Night Live
- Today With Kathie Lee and Hoda (reruns)
- The Tonight Show Starring Jimmy Fallon
