= 2021–22 United States network television schedule (late night) =

The 2021–22 network late night television schedule for the four major English-language commercial broadcast networks in the United States covers the late night hours from September 2021 to August 2022. The schedule is followed by a list per network of returning series, new series, and series canceled after the 2020–21 television season.

PBS is not included at all, as its member television stations have local flexibility over most of their schedules and broadcast times for network shows may vary. (PBS does offer its member stations packages of Amanpour & Company and BBC World News to air in late night timeslots Monday–Friday, and optional overnight access to its satellite feed, which rebroadcasts prime time programs shown either the previous evening or earlier in the week.) MyNetworkTV and The CW are not included as neither programming service offer late night programs of any kind.

Fox is not included in the weekday schedule, as it only airs late night network programming on Saturdays, and ABC and CBS are not included in the weekend schedule as both networks only air late night network programming on weekdays. NBC is not included on Sundays as it does not offer any network late night programming on Sundays year-round (outside of overruns of its prime time Sunday Night Football game telecasts into the late night time period during Fall).

Beginning this season, Ion Television is completely excluded; following its acquisition by the E. W. Scripps Company in 2021, it converted to an internet-only FAST channel the following year.

== Legend ==
- Light blue indicates local programming.
- Yellow indicates late night talk shows.
- Blue-gray indicates news programming.
- Light yellow indicates the current schedule.
- Light green indicates sporting events.
- Gray indicates encore programming.

== Schedule ==
- New series are highlighted in **bold**.
- Repeat airings or same-day rebroadcasts are indicated by **(R)**.
- All times correspond to U.S. Eastern and Pacific Time scheduling (except for some live sports or events). Except where affiliates slot certain programs outside their network-dictated timeslots, subtract one hour for Central, Mountain, Alaska, and Hawaii–Aleutian times.
- Local schedules may differ, as affiliates have the option to pre-empt or delay network programs, and fill timeslots not allocated to network programs with local, syndicated, or paid programming at their discretion. Such scheduling may be limited to preemptions caused by local or national breaking news or weather coverage (which may force stations to tape delay certain programs in overnight timeslots or defer them to a co-operated station or a digital subchannel in their regular timeslot) and any overrunning major sports events scheduled to air in a weekday timeslot (mainly during major holidays). Stations may air shows at other times at their preference.
- All sporting events air live in all time zones in correspondence to U.S. Eastern Time with local and/or overnight programming after game completion.

=== Weekday late nights ===
Network	11:00 p.m.	11:30 p.m.	12:00 a.m.	12:37 a.m.	1:00 a.m.	1:30 a.m.
ABC	Local programming	Jimmy Kimmel Live! (11:35)		Nightline	Local programming (1:07)	
CBS	Local programming	The Late Show with Stephen Colbert (11:35)		The Late Late Show with James Corden		Local programming (1:37)
NBC	Local programming	The Tonight Show Starring Jimmy Fallon (11:34)		Late Night with Seth Meyers		Local programming (1:37)

Note:

- ABC, CBS and NBC affiliates offer their rebroadcasts of the network evening newscasts to accommodate local scheduling in selecting markets that do not offer encores of the local late news; some stations that air encores of their local late newscasts will air the rebroadcast alongside the network evening news rebroadcasts (either acting as a lead-in to the networks' overnight newscasts), or with syndicated and time-lease programs.

=== Saturday late night ===
Network		11:00 p.m.	11:30 p.m.	12:00 a.m.	12:30 a.m.	1:00 a.m.	1:30 a.m.
Fox	Fall	Fox College Football	I Can See Your Voice (R)		Local programming		
Fox	Winter	I Can See Your Voice (R)		Local programming			
Fox	Spring	Name That Tune (R)		Local programming			
Fox	Summer	Beat Shazam (R)		Local programming			
NBC		Local programming	Saturday Night Live			Local programming (1:02)	

== By network ==
=== ABC ===
Returning series:

- Jimmy Kimmel Live!
- Nightline

=== CBS ===
Returning series:

- The Late Show with Stephen Colbert
- The Late Late Show with James Corden

=== Fox ===
Returning series:

- Beat Shazam (reruns)
- Fox College Football
- I Can See Your Voice (reruns)
- Name That Tune (reruns)

Not returning from 2020–21:

- Cosmos: Possible Worlds (reruns)
- Game of Talents (reruns)

=== NBC ===
Returning series:

- Late Night with Seth Meyers
- Saturday Night Live
- The Tonight Show Starring Jimmy Fallon

Not returning from 2020–21:

- A Little Late with Lilly Singh

== See also ==
- 2021–22 United States network television schedule (prime-time)
- 2021–22 United States network television schedule (morning)
- 2021–22 United States network television schedule (afternoon)
- 2021–22 United States network television schedule (overnight)
