= Cat Greenleaf =

American television personality

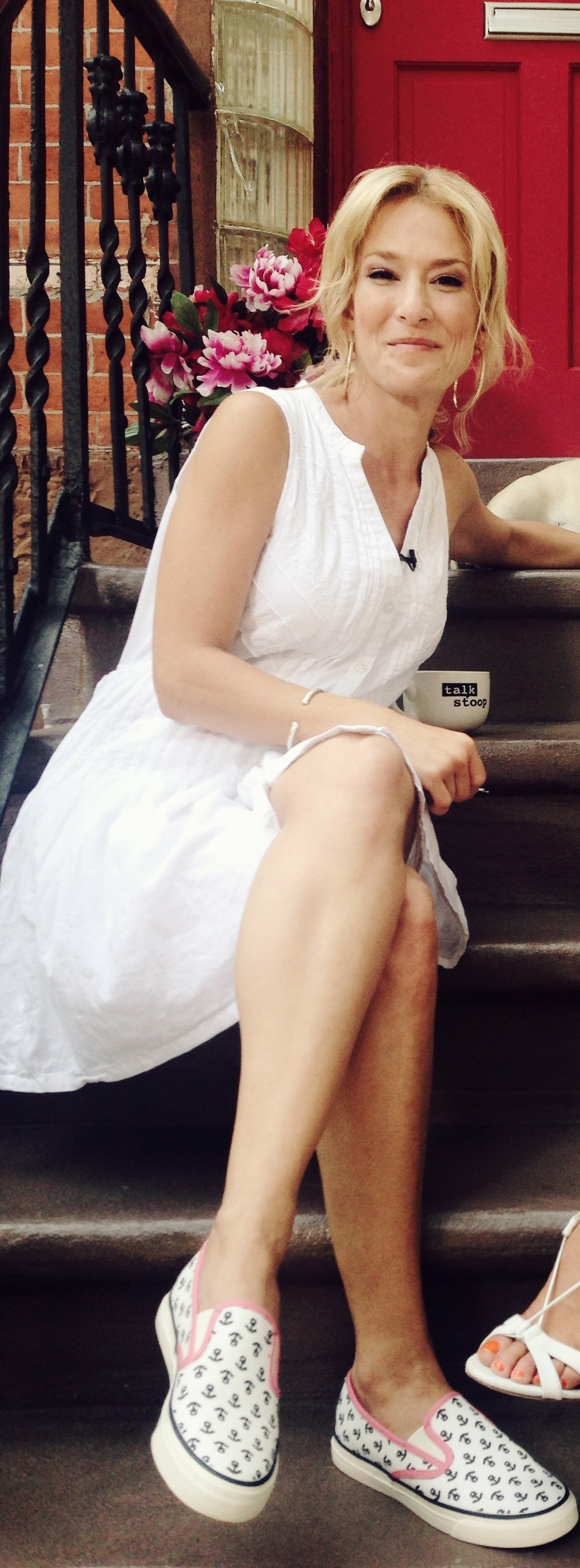
- Born: Catherine Kaye Greenleaf; March 13, 1972 (age 54); White Plains, New York
- Occupation: Television personality
- Years active: 1999–present
- Agent: International Management Group
- Spouse: Michael Rey
- Children: 2

Catherine Kaye Greenleaf (born March 13, 1972) is the former host of Talk Stoop.

== Career ==
Born in White Plains, New York, Greenleaf started her career as an airborne traffic reporter for KGO (AM) radio in San Francisco in 1999. The following year, she moved back to the East Coast and reported traffic on NY1, then moved to news reporting on WRNN-TV in Queens, New York. NYC Media hired Greenleaf to produce her own weekly lifestyle segment, On the Prowl with Cat Greenleaf.

Greenleaf moved to WNBC, working as the station's Features Reporter, primarily on Today in New York, and the 11 O'clock News. Her spots were seen on affiliates around the nation, as well as on the national Weekend Today Show, and the New York Non-Stop channel. Shortly after the birth of her first son, Primo, Greenleaf started hosting Talk Stoop. The show now airs in the top nine markets, and between broadcast, digital, and out-of-home platforms, Talk Stoop is viewed nearly 12 million times a week.

Greenleaf endorses LUST, a small accessories line with the slogan "Look Up Stop Txting" that endorses awareness of the people in the world and living in the moment.

In August 2015, she introduced the animated child incarnation of Nina Flores prior to the September 2015 debut of Nina's World.
