= 1st Look =

- Genre: Travel/Lifestyle
- Created by: Morgan Hertzan; Joseph Varet
- Presented by: Johnny "Bananas" Devenanzio (2018–2023); (for past hosts, see section)
- Country of origin: United States
- Original language: English
- No. of seasons: 13

Production
- Executive producers: Lemeya Al-Jinabi; (2018-present); Beth Gerstenbluth (2011– 2018); Lisa Lucas (2008–2011)
- Camera setup: Multi-camera
- Running time: 30 minutes
- Production company: LXTV

Original release
- Network: NBC
- Release: October 4, 2008 – present

1st Look is a weekly American travel and lifestyle television program broadcast on NBC. Produced by LXTV, it highlights top travel destinations around the country, with a focus on cuisine and nightlife. The program has had 11 different hosts to date, beginning with original hosts Gardner Loulan and Angela Sun. Audrina Patridge hosted 1st Look, joining the program in January 2014. On October 6, 2015, Ashley Roberts was named as Patridge's successor as host, taking over the role beginning with the January 9, 2016, episode. On July 12, 2018, it was announced that MTV personality Johnny "Bananas" Devenanzio would take over from Roberts as host beginning in September of that year.

Originally airing exclusively on NBC's owned-and-operated stations, the half-hour program airs in most markets on Saturday late-nights (usually immediately following Saturday Night Live) as part of NBC's overnight lineup of LXTV-produced programs, with an encore presentation on Friday late-nights; however, its timeslot may vary depending on the market due to commitments by affiliate to air local, syndicated or paid programming, while the program is pre-empted by some NBC affiliates (most notably, those owned by Graham Media Group, as well as WMC-TV in Memphis and WNYT in Albany.)

== Format ==
The program looks at various travel destinations around the United States, with occasional episodes also filmed in international locales. Each episode spotlights trendy and noteworthy restaurants, tourist attractions and nightlife in each location, with some segments featuring the host participating in diverse activities. Illustrations of local cuisine are the most common segments on 1st Look, with certain entire episodes featuring tours of restaurants in one or more regions and accordingly, a look at the making of some of the eatery's signature dishes. The program sometimes deviates from its normal format to feature behind-the-scenes aspects of special events (such as the Golden Globe Awards).

From 2011 to 2012, the program (through a partnership between LXTV and the lifestyle website Daily Candy) showcased special deals for home viewers involving locations featured on that week's episode.

== On-air staff ==
=== Current host ===
- Guests hosts

=== Former hosts ===
- Gardner Loulan (2008–2010)
- Viviana Vigil (2008–2010)
- Angela Sun (2008–2011)
- Pedro Andrade (2009–2011)
- Johanna Botta (2010–2011)
- Charles Divins (2011)
- Stuart Brazell (2011)
- Gerrad Hall (2011)
- Maria Sansone (2011–2012)
- Ali Fedotowsky (2012–2013)
- Audrina Patridge (2014–2015)
- Ashley Roberts (2016–2018)
- Johnny "Bananas" Devenanzio (2018–2023)
