= 2020–21 United States network television schedule (daytime) =

The 2020–21 daytime network television schedule for the five major English-language commercial broadcast networks in the United States covers the weekday and weekend daytime hours from September 2020 to August 2021. The schedule is followed by a list per network of returning series; no new series, but only one series is canceled after the 2019–20 season are included at present, as the daytime schedules of the four major networks that offer morning and/or afternoon programming is expected to remain consistent with the prior television season.

Affiliates fill time periods not occupied by network programs with local or syndicated programming. PBS – which offers daytime programming through a children's program block, PBS Kids – is not included, as its member television stations have local flexibility over most of their schedules and broadcast times for network shows may vary. Also not included are MyNetworkTV (as the programming service also does not offer daytime programs of any kind), and Ion Television and The CW Plus (as their schedules are composed mainly of syndicated reruns). Fox does not air network programming on weekdays. This is the last season in which The CW (which does not carry programming on Sunday mornings or afternoons) would program a daytime hour on weekdays.

== Legend ==
- Light yellow indicates talk shows.
- Green indicates soap operas.
- Pink indicates game shows.
- Gold indicates news and public affairs programming.
- Light teal indicates sporting events.
- Light purple indicates children's and/or E/I-compliant programming.
- Gray indicates encore programming (e.g., reruns of prime-time programming).
- Light blue indicates programs not applicable to the above categorizations.

== Schedule ==
- New series are highlighted in **bold**.
- All times correspond to U.S. Eastern and Pacific Time scheduling (except for some live sports or events). Except where affiliates slot certain programs outside their network-dictated timeslots, subtract one hour for Central, Mountain, Alaska, and Hawaii-Aleutian times.
- Local schedules may differ, as affiliates have the option to pre-empt or delay network programs. Such scheduling may be limited to preemptions caused by local or national breaking news or weather coverage (which may force stations to tape delay certain programs in overnight timeslots or defer them to a co-operated station or digital subchannel in their regular timeslot) and any major sports events scheduled to air in a weekday timeslot (mainly during major holidays). Stations may air shows at other times at their preference.
- All sporting events airs live in all time zones in U.S. Eastern time, with local programming by affiliates in western time zones after game completion.

=== Weekdays ===
Network	7:00 a.m.	7:30 a.m.	8:00 a.m.	8:30 a.m.	9:00 a.m.	9:30 a.m.	10:00 a.m.	10:30 a.m.	11:00 a.m.	11:30 a.m.	Noon	12:30 p.m.	1:00 p.m.	1:30 p.m.	2:00 p.m.	2:30 p.m.	3:00 p.m.	3:30 p.m.	4:00 p.m.	4:30 p.m.	5:00 p.m.	5:30 p.m.	6:00 p.m.	6:30 p.m.	7:00 p.m.	7:30 p.m.
ABC	Good Morning America				Local and/or syndicated programming				The View		Local and/or syndicated programming		GMA3: What You Need To Know		General Hospital*		Local and/or syndicated programming							ABC World News Tonight with David Muir	Local and/or syndicated programming	
CBS	CBS This Morning				Local and/or syndicated programming		Let's Make a Deal*		The Price Is Right		Local and/or syndicated programming	The Young and the Restless		The Bold and the Beautiful	The Talk		Local and/or syndicated programming							CBS Evening News with Norah O'Donnell	Local and/or syndicated programming	
NBC	Today				Today Third Hour		Today with Hoda & Jenna		Local and/or syndicated programming				Days of Our Lives		Local and/or syndicated programming									NBC Nightly News with Lester Holt	Local and/or syndicated programming	
The CW	Local and/or syndicated programming																The Jerry Springer Show (R)		Local and/or syndicated programming							

Notes:

- ABC, CBS and NBC offer their early morning newscasts via a looping feed (usually running as late as 10:00 a.m. Pacific Time) to accommodate local scheduling in the westernmost contiguous time zones or for use a filler programming for stations that do not offer a local morning newscast; some stations without a morning newscast may air syndicated or time-lease programs instead of the full newscast loop.
- ABC stations have the option of airing General Hospital at 2:00 or 3:00 p.m. Eastern Time, depending on the station's choice of feed.
- Depending on their choice of feed, CBS stations have the option of airing Let's Make a Deal at either 10:00 a.m. or 3:00 p.m. Eastern (airtime adjusted by time zone), and/or The Young and the Restless at 11:00 or 11:30 a.m. local time (in the Central, Mountain, and Pacific time zones).
- NBC stations have the option of airing Days of Our Lives at varying airtimes (usually between Noon and 2:00 p.m. local time), depending on the station's preference and choice of feed. Days was pre-empted from July 26–August 6, 2021 due to the network's live coverage of the 2021 Summer Olympics from Tokyo, Japan.
- On May 13, 2021, The CW announced it would return the 3:00 p.m. slot to its affiliates effective September 6, in exchange for allowing the network to occupy the Saturday 8:00-10:00 p.m. ET/PT timeslot.

=== Saturday ===
Network		7:00 a.m.	7:30 a.m.	8:00 a.m.	8:30 a.m.	9:00 a.m.	9:30 a.m.	10:00 a.m.	10:30 a.m.	11:00 a.m.	11:30 a.m.	Noon	12:30 p.m.	1:00 p.m.	1:30 p.m.	2:00 p.m.	2:30 p.m.	3:00 p.m.	3:30 p.m.	4:00 p.m.	4:30 p.m.	5:00 p.m.	5:30 p.m.	6:00 p.m.	6:30 p.m.	7:00 p.m.	7:30 p.m.
ABC‡	Fall	Good Morning America				Sea Rescue (R)	Ocean Treks with Jeff Corwin	Oh Baby! with Anji Corley	Hearts of Heroes	Outback Adventures (R)	Rock the Park	ESPN College Football on ABC														College Football Scoreboard	Saturday Night Football (continued to game completion)
ABC‡	Winter	Good Morning America				Sea Rescue (R)	Ocean Treks with Jeff Corwin	Oh Baby! with Anji Corley	Hearts of Heroes	Outback Adventures (R)	Rock the Park	Local, syndicated or ESPN on ABC sports programming						ESPN College Basketball on ABC				Local and/or syndicated programming		Local news	ABC World News Tonight with Whit Johnson	Local and/or syndicated programming	
ABC‡	Spring	Good Morning America				Sea Rescue (R)	Ocean Treks with Jeff Corwin	Oh Baby! with Anji Corley	Hearts of Heroes	Outback Adventures (R)	**Free Enterprise**	Local, syndicated and/or ESPN on ABC sports programming		WNBA on ESPN								Local and/or syndicated programming		Local news	ABC World News Tonight with Whit Johnson	Local and/or syndicated programming	
ABC‡	Summer	Good Morning America				Sea Rescue (R)	Ocean Treks with Jeff Corwin	Oh Baby! with Anji Corley	Hearts of Heroes	Outback Adventures (R)	**Free Enterprise**	ESPN on ABC sports programming												Local news	ABC World News Tonight with Whit Johnson	Local and/or syndicated programming	
CBS	Fall	CBS This Morning Saturday				Lucky Dog	The Henry Ford's Innovation Nation with Mo Rocca	Mission Unstoppable with Miranda Cosgrove	Hope in the Wild	Pet Vet Dream Team	All In with Laila Ali (R)	Local, syndicated and/or CBS Sports programming						College Football Today	SEC on CBS / College Football on CBS							Local and/or syndicated programming	
CBS	Winter	CBS This Morning Saturday				Lucky Dog	The Henry Ford's Innovation Nation with Mo Rocca	Mission Unstoppable with Miranda Cosgrove	Hope in the Wild	Pet Vet Dream Team	All In with Laila Ali (R)	College Basketball on CBS												Local news	CBS Weekend News	Local and/or syndicated programming	
CBS	Spring	CBS This Morning Saturday				Lucky Dog	The Henry Ford's Innovation Nation with Mo Rocca	Mission Unstoppable with Miranda Cosgrove	Hope in the Wild	Pet Vet Dream Team	All In with Laila Ali (R)	Local, syndicated and/or CBS Sports programming						PGA Tour on CBS						Local news	CBS Weekend News	Local and/or syndicated programming	
CBS	Summer	CBS This Morning Saturday				Lucky Dog	The Henry Ford's Innovation Nation with Mo Rocca	Mission Unstoppable with Miranda Cosgrove	Hope in the Wild	Pet Vet Dream Team	All In with Laila Ali (R)	Big3 on CBS						PGA Tour on CBS						Local news	CBS Weekend News	Local and/or syndicated programming	
The CW		Local and/or syndicated programming		Jack Hanna's Into the Wild			This Old House: Trade School	Jewels of the Natural World	Tails of Valor (R)	Local and/or syndicated programming																	
Fox‡	Fall	Xploration Awesome Planet	Xploration Outer Space	**Xploration Life 2.0**	Xploration Weird But True	Xploration DIY Sci	Xploration Nature Knows Best	Big Noon Kickoff				Fox College Football (continued to game completion)															
Fox‡	Winter	Xploration Awesome Planet	Xploration Outer Space	**Xploration Life 2.0**	Xploration Weird But True	Xploration DIY Sci	Xploration Nature Knows Best	Weekend Marketplace			Fox College Hoops															Local and/or syndicated programming	
Fox‡	Spring	Xploration Awesome Planet	Xploration Outer Space	**Xploration Life 2.0**	Xploration Weird But True	Xploration DIY Sci	Xploration Nature Knows Best	Weekend Marketplace				Local, syndicated and/or Fox Sports programming						**TSL on Fox**						Local and/or syndicated programming		Fox Major League Baseball (continued to game completion)	
Fox‡	Summer	Xploration Awesome Planet	Xploration Outer Space	**Xploration Life 2.0**	Xploration Weird But True	Xploration DIY Sci	Xploration Nature Knows Best	Weekend Marketplace				Local, syndicated and/or Fox Sports programming												MLS on Fox			
NBC	Fall	Today				Vets Saving Pets	The Voyager with Josh Garcia	Earth Odyssey with Dylan Dreyer		A New Leaf (R)	The Champion Within with Lauren Thompson	Premier League on NBC						Notre Dame Football on NBC								Local and/or syndicated programming	
NBC	Winter	Today				Vets Saving Pets	The Voyager with Josh Garcia	Earth Odyssey with Dylan Dreyer	**One Team: The Power of Sports**	**Wild Child**	Roots Less Traveled	Premier League on NBC						Golf Channel on NBC						Local news	NBC Nightly News with Jose Diaz-Balart	Local and/or syndicated programming	
NBC	Spring	Today				Vets Saving Pets	The Voyager with Josh Garcia	Earth Odyssey with Dylan Dreyer	**One Team: The Power of Sports**	**Wild Child**	Roots Less Traveled	Premier League on NBC						NHL on NBC						Local news	NBC Nightly News with Jose Diaz-Balart	Local and/or syndicated programming	
NBC	Summer	Today				Vets Saving Pets	The Voyager with Josh Garcia	Earth Odyssey with Dylan Dreyer	**One Team: The Power of Sports**	**Wild Child**	Roots Less Traveled	IndyCar Series on NBC						**Olympic Channel on NBC**						Local news	NBC Nightly News with Jose Diaz-Balart	Local and/or syndicated programming	

Notes:

- (‡) ABC and Fox do not handle programming responsibilities for their programming blocks, but offers syndicated blocks of E/I-compliant programming that are intended for exclusive distribution to their stations. Litton's Weekend Adventure is offered to ABC stations by arrangement with Litton Entertainment and Xploration Station is offered to Fox stations by arrangement with Steve Rotfeld Productions.
- NBC may occasionally aired NBC Nightly News: Kids Edition on certain Saturdays; depending on the local station's scheduling at their discretion to fulfill the FCC educational programming requirements, and the program is not part of the network's The More You Know block.
- To comply with FCC educational programming regulations, stations may defer certain programs featured in their respective network's E/I program blocks to determined weekend late morning or afternoon time periods if a sporting event is not scheduled in the timeslot or in place of paid programming that would otherwise be scheduled.
- Airtimes of sporting events may vary depending on the offerings scheduled for that weekend (in which Fox or NBC could possibly air in the mornings on select weekends in which preempt E/I programming).

=== Sunday ===
Network		7:00 a.m.	7:30 a.m.	8:00 a.m.	8:30 a.m.	9:00 a.m.	9:30 a.m.	10:00 a.m.	10:30 a.m.	11:00 a.m.	11:30 a.m.	Noon	12:30 p.m.	1:00 p.m.	1:30 p.m.	2:00 p.m.	2:30 p.m.	3:00 p.m.	3:30 p.m.	4:00 p.m.	4:30 p.m.	5:00 p.m.	5:30 p.m.	6:00 p.m.	6:30 p.m.	7:00 p.m.	7:30 p.m.
ABC	Fall	Good Morning America		Local and/or syndicated programming		This Week with George Stephanopoulos		Local, syndicated and/or ESPN on ABC sports programming										WNBA on ESPN				Local and/or syndicated programming		Local news	ABC World News Tonight with Tom Llamas		
ABC	Winter	Good Morning America		Local and/or syndicated programming		This Week with George Stephanopoulos		Local, syndicated and/or ESPN on ABC sports programming										NBA Countdown	NBA Sunday Showcase					Local news	ABC World News Tonight with Tom Llamas		
ABC	Spring	Good Morning America		Local and/or syndicated programming		This Week with George Stephanopoulos		Local, syndicated and/or ESPN on ABC sports programming										ESPN Major League Soccer					Local and/or syndicated programming	Local news	ABC World News Tonight with Tom Llamas		
ABC	Late spring	Good Morning America		Local and/or syndicated programming		This Week with George Stephanopoulos		Local and/or syndicated programming					NBA Countdown	NBA on ABC										Local news	ABC World News Tonight with Tom Llamas		
ABC	Summer	Good Morning America		Local and/or syndicated programming		This Week with George Stephanopoulos		Local and/or syndicated programming				ESPN on ABC sports programming												Local news	ABC World News Tonight with Tom Llamas		
CBS	Fall	Local and/or syndicated programming				CBS News Sunday Morning			Face the Nation		Local and/or syndicated programming	The NFL Today		NFL on CBS													
CBS	Winter	Local and/or syndicated programming				CBS News Sunday Morning			Face the Nation		Local and/or syndicated programming	College Basketball on CBS													CBS Weekend News		
CBS	Spring	Local and/or syndicated programming				CBS News Sunday Morning			Face the Nation		Local, syndicated and/or CBS Sports programming							PGA Tour on CBS						Local news	CBS Weekend News		
Fox	Fall	Local and/or syndicated programming				Fox News Sunday		Local and/or syndicated programming		Fox NFL Kickoff		Fox NFL Sunday		Fox NFL (continued to game completion)													
Fox	Winter	Local and/or syndicated programming				Fox News Sunday		Local and/or syndicated programming				PBA Tour on Fox						NASCAR on Fox									
Fox	Spring	Local and/or syndicated programming				Fox News Sunday		Local, syndicated and/or Fox Sports programming												MLS on Fox				Local and/or syndicated programming			
Fox	Summer	Local and/or syndicated programming				Fox News Sunday		Local, syndicated and/or Fox Sports programming								NHRA on Fox								Local and/or syndicated programming			
NBC	Fall	Sunday Today with Willie Geist		Local and/or syndicated programming		Meet the Press		Local and/or syndicated programming						NASCAR America		NASCAR on NBC								Local news	NBC Nightly News with Kate Snow		
NBC	Winter	Sunday Today with Willie Geist		Local and/or syndicated programming		Meet the Press		Local and/or syndicated programming				NHL on NBC						Golf Channel on NBC						Local news	NBC Nightly News with Kate Snow		
NBC	Spring	Sunday Today with Willie Geist		Local and/or syndicated programming		Meet the Press		Local and/or syndicated programming				NHL on NBC												Local news	NBC Nightly News with Kate Snow		
NBC	Summer	Sunday Today with Willie Geist		Local and/or syndicated programming		Meet the Press		Local and/or syndicated programming				IndyCar Series on NBC						**Olympic Channel on NBC**						Local news	NBC Nightly News with Kate Snow		

Notes:

- To comply with FCC educational programming regulations, stations may defer certain programs featured in their respective network's E/I program blocks to determined weekend late morning or afternoon time periods if a sporting event is not scheduled in the timeslot or in place of paid programming that would otherwise be scheduled.
- Airtimes of sporting events may vary depending on the offerings scheduled for that weekend.

== By network ==
=== ABC ===
Returning series:

- ABC News
  - ABC World News Tonight
  - GMA3: What You Need To Know
  - Good Morning America
  - This Week with George Stephanopoulos
- ESPN on ABC
  - ESPN College Basketball on ABC
  - ESPN College Football on ABC
  - College Football Scoreboard
  - ESPN Major League Soccer
  - NBA Countdown
  - NBA Sunday Showcase
- General Hospital
- Litton's Weekend Adventure‡
  - Hearts of Heroes (shared with Go Time in First-run syndication)
  - Ocean Treks with Jeff Corwin
  - Oh Baby! with Anji Corley
  - Outback Adventures with Tim Faulkner (reruns) (Note: The series was previously aired on Litton's Weekend Adventure from 2014–17 and will air repeats throughout this season.)
  - Rock the Park (shared with Go Time in First-run syndication)
  - Sea Rescue (reruns) (Note: The series was previously aired on Litton's Weekend Adventure from 2012–18 and will air repeats throughout this season.)
- The View

New series:

- Litton's Weekend Adventure‡
  - Free Enterprise

Not returning from 2019–20:

- Litton's Weekend Adventure‡
  - Jack Hanna's Wild Countdown
- XFL returned in 2023

=== CBS ===
Returning series:

- CBS Dream Team
  - All In with Laila Ali (reruns) (Note: The series was previously aired on CBS Dream Team from 2013–15 and will air repeats throughout this season.)
  - Lucky Dog
  - The Henry Ford's Innovation Nation with Mo Rocca
  - Hope in the Wild
  - Mission Unstoppable with Miranda Cosgrove
  - Pet Vet Dream Team
- CBS News
  - CBS Evening News
  - CBS News Sunday Morning
  - Face the Nation
  - CBS This Morning
    - CBS This Morning Saturday
- CBS Sports
  - Big3 on CBS
  - College Basketball on CBS
  - College Football Today
  - College Football on CBS
  - NFL on CBS
  - PGA Tour on CBS
  - The NFL Today
- Let's Make a Deal
- The Bold and the Beautiful
- The Price Is Right
- The Talk
- The Young and the Restless

Not returning from 2019–20:

- CBS Dream Team
  - Best Friends Furever with Kel Mitchell (moved to One Magnificent Morning)

=== Fox ===
Returning series:

- Fox News Sunday
- Fox Sports
  - Fox Big Noon Kickoff
  - Fox Big Noon Saturday
  - Fox College Hoops
  - Fox College Hoops Tipoff
  - Fox NASCAR
  - Fox NFL Kickoff
  - Fox NFL Sunday
  - NASCAR RaceDay
- Weekend Marketplace
- Xploration Station‡
  - Xploration Awesome Planet
  - Xploration DIY Sci
  - Xploration Nature Knows Best
  - Xploration Outer Space
  - Xploration Weird But True

New series:

- Xploration Station‡
  - Xploration Life 2.0
- Fox Sports
  - TSL on Fox

Not returning from 2019–20:

- XFL on Fox

=== The CW ===
Returning series:

- The Jerry Springer Show (reruns)
- One Magnificent Morning
  - Jack Hanna's Into the Wild
  - Jewels of the Natural World
  - This Old House: Trade School

New series:

- One Magnificent Morning
  - Tails of Valor (moved from CBS Dream Team) (reruns) (Note: The series was previously aired on CBS Dream Team in 2019.)

Not returning from 2019–20:

- One Magnificent Morning
  - Chicken Soup for the Soul's Animal Tales
  - Did I Mention Invention? with Alie Ward (moved to Go Time in First-run syndication)

=== NBC ===
Returning series:

- Days of Our Lives
- The More You Know
  - A New Leaf (reruns) (Note: The series was previously aired on The More You Know from last season and will aired repeats throughout this season.)
  - The Champion Within with Lauren Thompson
  - Earth Odyssey with Dylan Dreyer
  - Roots Less Traveled
  - Vets Saving Pets
- NBC News
  - Today
    - Sunday Today with Willie Geist
    - Today Third Hour
    - Today with Hoda & Jenna
  - Meet the Press
  - NBC Nightly News
- NBC Sports
  - NHL Game of the Week
  - Premier League on NBC
  - Golf Channel on NBC
  - NASCAR on NBC
  - NASCAR America

New series:

- The More You Know
  - One Team: The Power of Sports
  - Wild Child

Not returning from 2019–20:

- The More You Know
  - Consumer 101

== Renewals and cancellations ==
=== Series renewals ===
==== ABC ====
- NHL on ESPN—It was announced on March 10, 2021, that its sister network ESPN will regain the rights to the National Hockey League games (including 25 games slated to air on ESPN and ABC) for seven years through the 2027–28 season.

==== Fox ====
- XFL on Fox—Renewed through the 2022 season on May 6, 2019. The league announced it would not play a 2021 season on October 1, 2020, but would return for the 2022 season.

==== NBC ====
- Days of Our Lives—Renewed for a 57th and 58th season (running through September 2023) on May 11, 2021.

=== Cancellations ===
==== The CW ====
- The Jerry Springer Show—The network daytime run was meant to run for three seasons only. It concluded on September 17, 2021.

==== NBC ====
- NHL on NBC—On April 26, 2021, it was announced that NBC had backed out of negotiations for the partial contractual rights of the remainder of the National Hockey League games (including the New Year's Day Winter Classic) and awarded the rights to Turner Sports beginning with the 2021–22 season and lasted through 2027–28 season.

== See also ==
- 2020–21 United States network television schedule (prime-time)
- 2020–21 United States network television schedule (late night)
- 2020-21 United States network television schedule (morning)
- 2020-21 United States network television schedule (overnight)

== Sources ==
- Curt Alliaume. "ABC Daytime Schedule". Curt Alliaume's Utterly Irrelevant Web Site. Archived from the original on October 15, 2007.
- Curt Alliaume. "CBS Daytime Schedule". Curt Alliaume's Utterly Irrelevant Web Site. Archived from the original on October 15, 2007.
- Curt Alliaume. "NBC Daytime Schedule". Curt Alliaume's Utterly Irrelevant Web Site. Archived from the original on October 12, 2007.
