= College Football Scoreboard =

- Starring: Kevin Connors; Joey Galloway; EJ Manuel; Alyssa Lang; Kevin Negandhi; Booger McFarland; Jordan Rodgers
- Country of origin: United States

Production
- Running time: 30–45 minutes

Original release
- Network: ESPN; ESPN2; ABC
- Release: 2001 – present

College Football Scoreboard is a program on ESPN, ESPN2, and ABC that provides up-to-the-minute scores, highlights, pre-game and post-game interviews, and check-ins of games of interest through 'bonus coverage' during the college football season throughout each Saturday. The name of the show was College Gameday Scoreboard until 2006.

Airing several times throughout Saturday, it is often a transition program between the early afternoon and late afternoon games, along with primetime games before Saturday Night Football/ESPN College Football Primetime, then late night Western matchups. In practice, it is subject to being, and often is, pre-empted, due to earlier games running long into the show's timeslot, and often games run into each other without any kind of Scoreboard interlude. Conversely, a week with few ESPN-contracted games and those games being influenced by outside events such as weather delays or game cancellations can rarely cause the show to run the length of an entire game.

- ESPN and ESPN2's version is hosted by Kevin Conners or Alyssa Lang along with analysis from Joey Galloway and EJ Manuel (who also appeared on the late night College Football Final).
- On ABC, it is hosted by their studio team of Kevin Negandhi, Booger McFarland and Jordan Rodgers.

== See also ==
- College GameDay
- College Football Final
- ESPN College Football Primetime
