= Outback Adventures with Tim Faulkner =

- Genre: Educational
- Presented by: Tim Faulkner
- Country of origin: United States
- Original language: English
- No. of seasons: 3
- No. of episodes: 54

Production
- Producer: Colin Penney
- Running time: 21 minutes
- Production company: Litton Entertainment

Original release
- Network: Syndication
- Release: October 4, 2014 – September 30, 2017

Outback Adventures with Tim Faulkner is an educational reality television series airing on ABC on Saturday mornings since October 2014. This series originally aired as part of Weekend Adventure. It shows the work of Tim Faulkner (born March 8, 1982, in Greystanes, New South Wales) and the team of Australian Reptile Park during their daily jobs.

Reruns of this series aired Saturday mornings on Antenna TV until September 5, 2020. It returned to ABC's Weekend Adventure on October 3, 2020, until 2022.
