= Talk Stoop =

US television program

- Genre: Talk show
- Presented by: Cat Greenleaf (2009–17); Nessa (2018–19)
- Country of origin: United States
- Original language: English

Production
- Production company: NBCUniversal

Original release
- Network: NBC
- Release: 2009 – November 9, 2019

Talk Stoop is an American television talk show hosted by Nessa, and formerly by Cat Greenleaf. Talk Stoop is broadcast in the top nine American television markets, and can be seen on out-of-home screens, including cabs and gas stations, across the United States.

== Format ==
Subjects were originally interviewed on Greenleaf’s stoop in Cobble Hill, Brooklyn and sat for a 15–20 minute interview covering career highlights, life story, issues of the day and current projects; musical guests' appearances include performances. Formerly, guests would also enter Greenleaf's home kitchen, for shooting of the web-only segment Kitchen Confessions. Since 2018, host Nessa has conducted the interviews on a prop "stoop", inside a television studio.

The show is known for its intimate style. Because the interviews took place on a stoop (rather than on a set, or in front of an audience), Greenleaf claimed that she was able to ask more personal questions that elicited more honest answers.

== Broadcast ==
Talk Stoop's broadcast reaches approximately 12 million viewers/month. It also plays in taxi cabs and is viewed by 12.4 million viewers in New York City, Chicago, Boston, Washington, D.C., Miami, Atlanta, Dallas and San Francisco. On gas pumps it reaches 1.8 million viewers/month nationwide. In August 2013, the show began to air in daytime on USA Network as an interstitial program.
