= Labor of Love (TV series) =

American dating game show

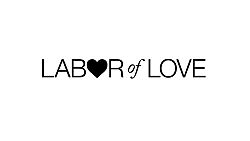
- Genre: Dating game show
- Presented by: Kristin Davis
- Starring: Kristy Katzmann
- Country of origin: United States
- Original language: English
- No. of seasons: 1
- No. of episodes: 8

Production
- Executive producers: Howard Owens; Ben Silverman; Anne Walls; Spike Van Briesen; Laurie Girion
- Production companies: Propagate Content; Full Picture

Original release
- Network: Fox
- Release: May 21 – July 16, 2020

Labor of Love is an American dating game show that aired on Fox from May 21 to July 16, 2020. The show was hosted by Sex and the City actress Kristin Davis and starred former The Bachelor season 11 contestant Kristy Katzmann. Over eight episodes, 15 men participated in challenges and dates that tested their parenting and personal skills. Those whom Katzmann found satisfactory advanced to the following episode, and at the end of the series, she decided – with the help of Davis – whether to choose one of the men to start a family with or not. The show began production in mid-2017.

The show has sparked some backlash online and has been described by some critics as "bizarre" and "dangerous in gamifying and making a competition out of the creation of life."

After filming ended, Katzmann dated the winner, Kyle Klinger, for a few months, but the couple broke up and Katzmann chose to pursue in vitro fertilization on her own.

On September 8, 2021, it was revealed that the series was officially cancelled.

== Contestants ==
The cast consists of 15 eligible men.

Contestant	Age	Hometown	Occupation	Episodes							
Contestant	Age	Hometown	Occupation	1	2	3	4	5	6	7	8
Kyle Klinger	38	Austin, TX	Director of Sales and Marketing								WINNER
Stewart Gill	40	Los Angeles, CA	Wealth Management CEO								OUT
Marcus Lehman	39	Cincinnati, OH	Anesthesiologist							OUT	
Trent Broach	36	Denver, CO	Tennis Instructor						OUT		
Gary Malec	38	San Francisco, CA	Baseball Bat Manufacturer						OUT		
Keith Reams	38	Los Angeles, CA	Gym Owner					OUT			
Alan Santini	39	South Africa	Writer				OUT				
Matt Kaye	44	West Hempstead, NY	Former Professional Wrestler				OUT				
Jason Christopher Smith	38	Huntersville, NC	Flooring Business Owner			OUT					
Angelo Castricone	39	Miami, FL	Firefighter			OUT					
Walker Posey	41	North Augusta, SC	Funeral Director			OUT					
Mario Calderon	40	New York, NY	Optician		OUT						
Budge Collinson	44	Edgewater, MD	Creative Director		OUT						
Phillip Michael Jacques	38	Los Angeles, CA	Medical Technician	OUT							
Tali Raphaely	46	Miami, FL	Attorney	OUT							

== Ratings ==
Viewership and ratings per episode of Labor of Love
No.	Title	Air date	Rating/share (18–49)	Viewers (millions)	DVR (18–49)	DVR viewers (millions)	Total (18–49)	Total viewers (millions)	Ref.
1	"15 First Dates"	May 21, 2020	0.2/1	0.89	0.0	0.23	0.3	1.12	
2	"Crazy, Stupid, Bear"	May 28, 2020	0.3/2	1.10	0.0	0.21	0.3	1.31	
3	"10 Things Kristy Likes About You"	June 4, 2020	0.2/1	0.90	0.0	0.22	0.3	1.12	
4	"Some Like It Extra Hot"	June 11, 2020	0.2/1	0.91	0.1	0.22	0.3	1.14	
5	"40 Year Old... Fathers"	June 18, 2020	0.3/1	1.04	0.1	0.21	0.3	1.25	
6	"You've Got Babies"	June 25, 2020	0.2/1	0.88	0.1	0.22	0.3	1.10	
7	"There's Something about Kristy"	July 9, 2020	0.2/1	0.91	0.1	0.25	0.3	1.16	
8	"Sleepless in Chicago"	July 16, 2020	0.2/1	0.95	0.1	0.24	0.3	1.19	
