= NASCAR America =

- Also known as: NASCAR America Motormouths (2021–present)
- Genre: Auto racing
- Presented by: Rick Allen; Dale Earnhardt Jr.; Steve Letarte; Carolyn Manno; Leigh Diffey; Jeff Burton; Kyle Petty; Dale Jarrett; Marty Snider; Kelli Stavast; Nate Ryan; Danielle Trotta
- Country of origin: United States

Production
- Running time: 60 minutes

Original release
- Network: NBCSN (2014–21); Peacock (2021–present)
- Release: February 24, 2014 – present

NASCAR America is Peacock's biweekly NASCAR news program, broadcast Mondays and Wednesdays at 6:00 p.m. ET. The show made its debut on February 24, 2014, the day after the 2014 Daytona 500.

== History ==
Starting in 2015, the show was hosted on a regular basis by Krista Voda, who joined NBC after previously working for Fox NASCAR.

In 2019, NASCAR America debuted "NASCAR America Presents: Motormouths" on Wednesday nights, an alternative format to the show that would allow fans to call in to the hosts, analysts and guests. In 2020, that show format would be renamed "NASCAR America: Motormouths", and be increased from once to twice a week (on Tuesdays and Thursdays).

On March 22, 2021, NBC announced that "Motormouths" would be moved from NBCSN to their Peacock streaming service. Those episodes would still air biweekly, now on Mondays and Wednesdays at 6PM.

NBCSN shut down at the end of the 2021, leaving the traditionally formatted episodes' future in question. "NASCAR America Motormouths", however, was renewed for 2022, with no changes from 2021.

== See also ==
- NASCAR Race Hub
- NASCAR on NBC
