= NBC Owned Television Stations =

Television station division of NBC

- Formerly: NBC Owned-and-Operated Stations Group; NBC Local Media
- Type: Division
- Industry: Broadcast television
- Founded: July 1, 1941; 85 years ago
- Key people: Valari Staab (Chairman); Frank Comerford (Chief revenue officer, President of commercial operations); Meredith McGinn; EVP of COZI TV & LX.TV)
- Parent: NBC (1941–1992); NBC Broadcasting (1992–2013); NBCUniversal Local (2013–present)
- Divisions: 11 TV stations; New England Cable News (1992-2026); Cozi TV; LXTV; Skycastle Entertainment
- Website: together.nbcuni.com/n/nbc-owned-television-stations

NBC Owned Television Stations (formerly NBC Local Media and NBC Owned-and-Operated Stations Group) is the division of NBCUniversal Local (NBCUniversal), a subsidiary of Comcast that oversees the NBC owned-and-operated television stations, Cozi TV network, LXTV and Skycastle Entertainment, its in-house marketing and promotion company. NBCUniversal's Telemundo owned-and-operated stations are held in the separate Telemundo Station Group.

== History ==
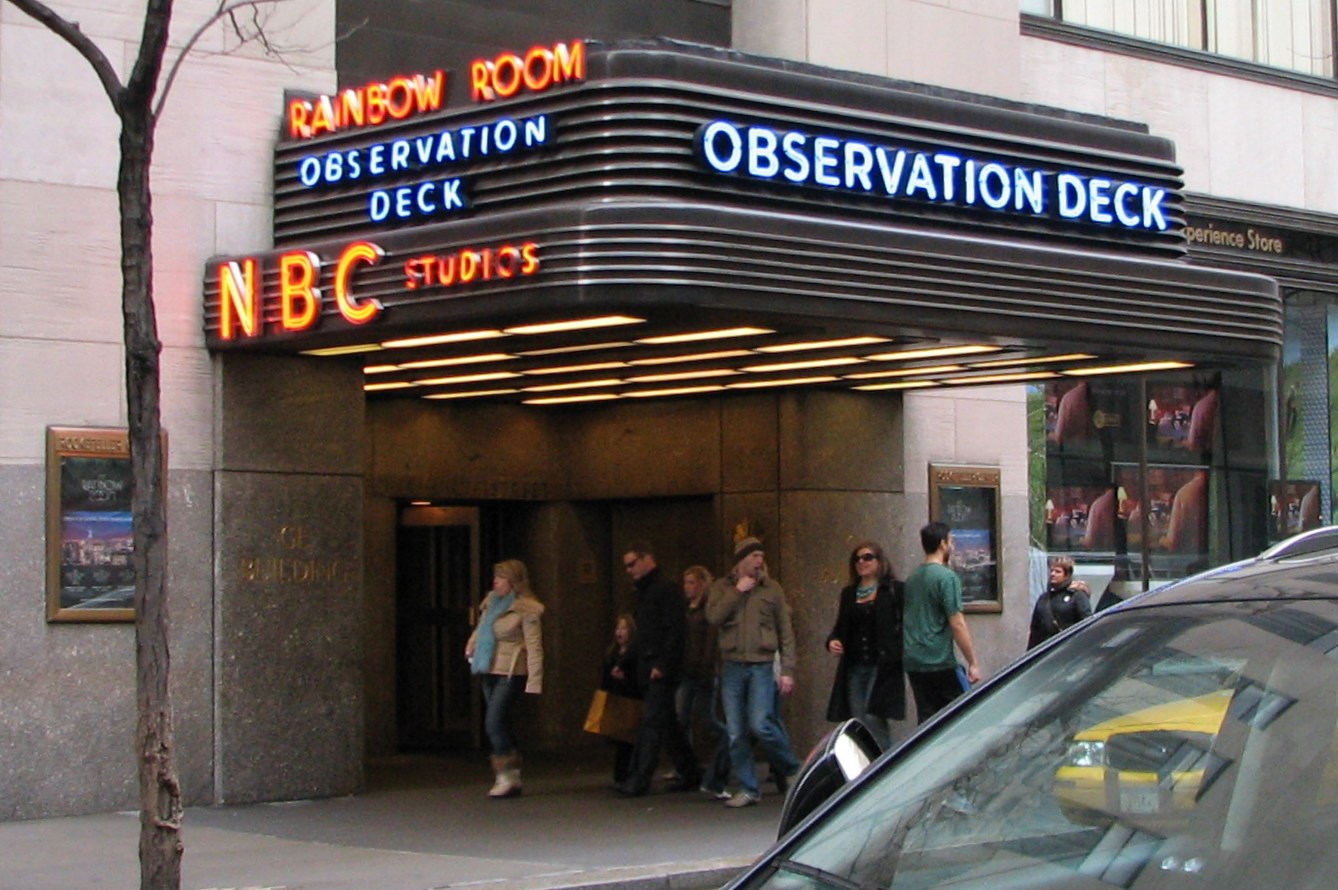
The entrance to NBC Studios at 30 Rockefeller Plaza in New York City, where WNBC operates

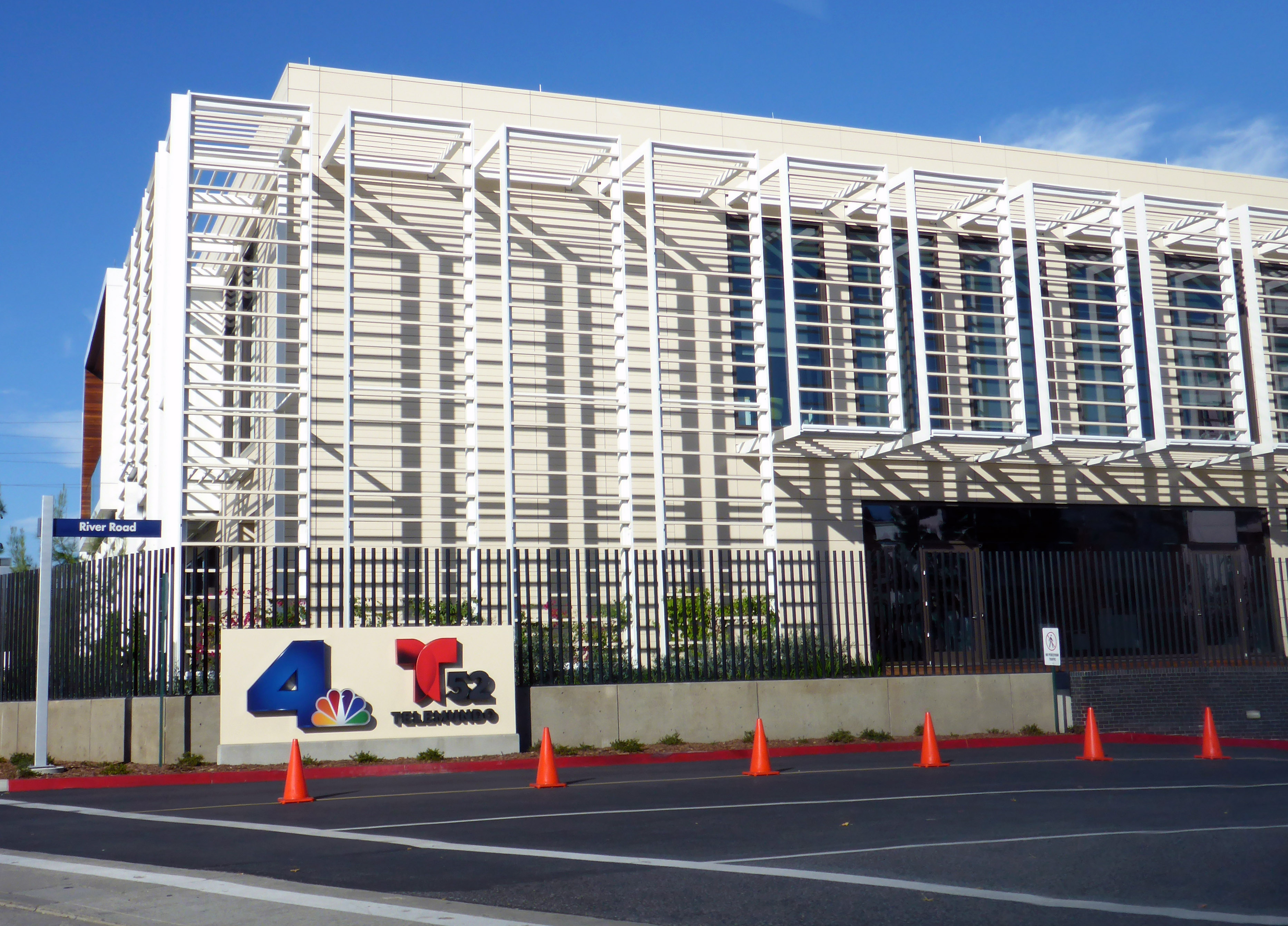
The entrance to Gate 3 of the Universal Studios Hollywood lot, where KNBC has operated from since 2014

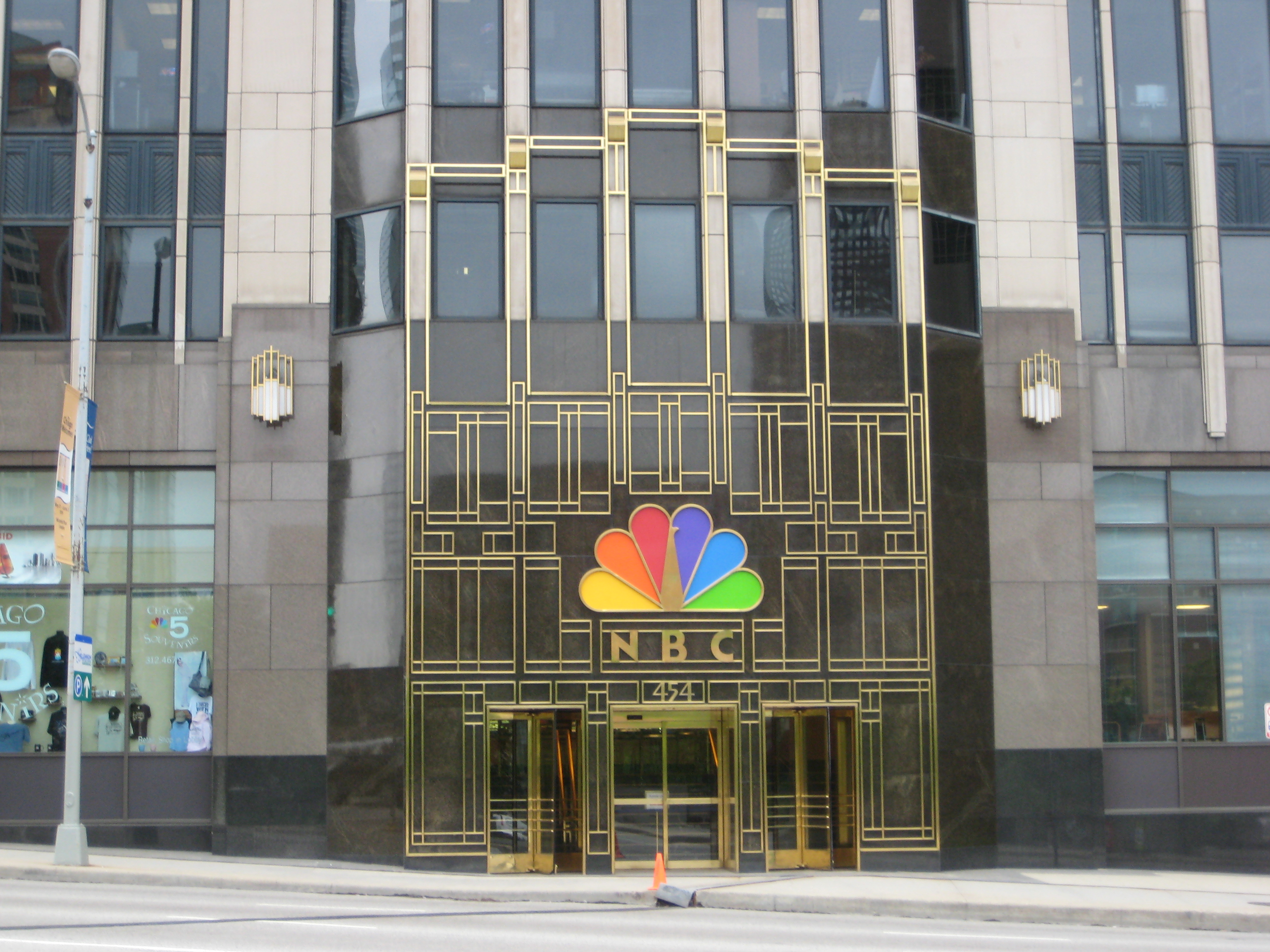
The entrance to the NBC Tower in Chicago, home of WMAQ

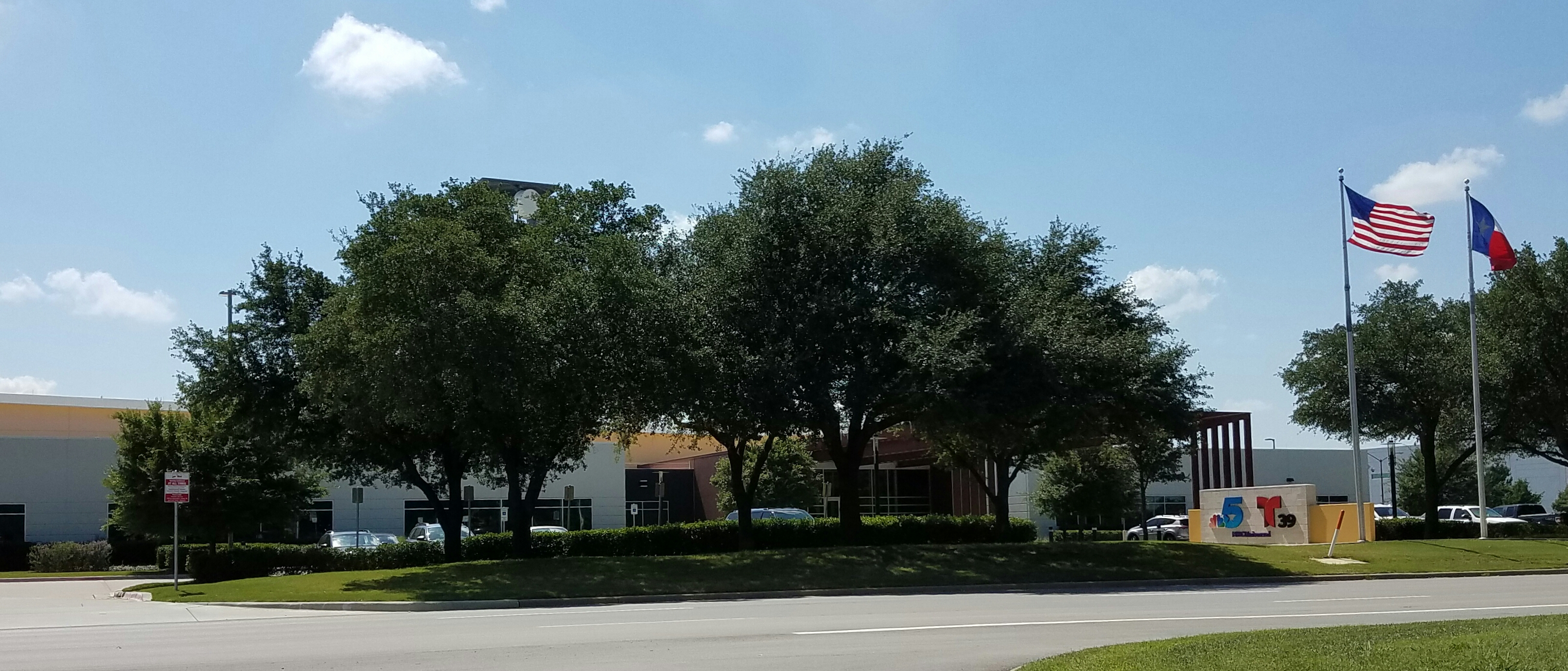
The KXAS studios in Fort Worth, Texas

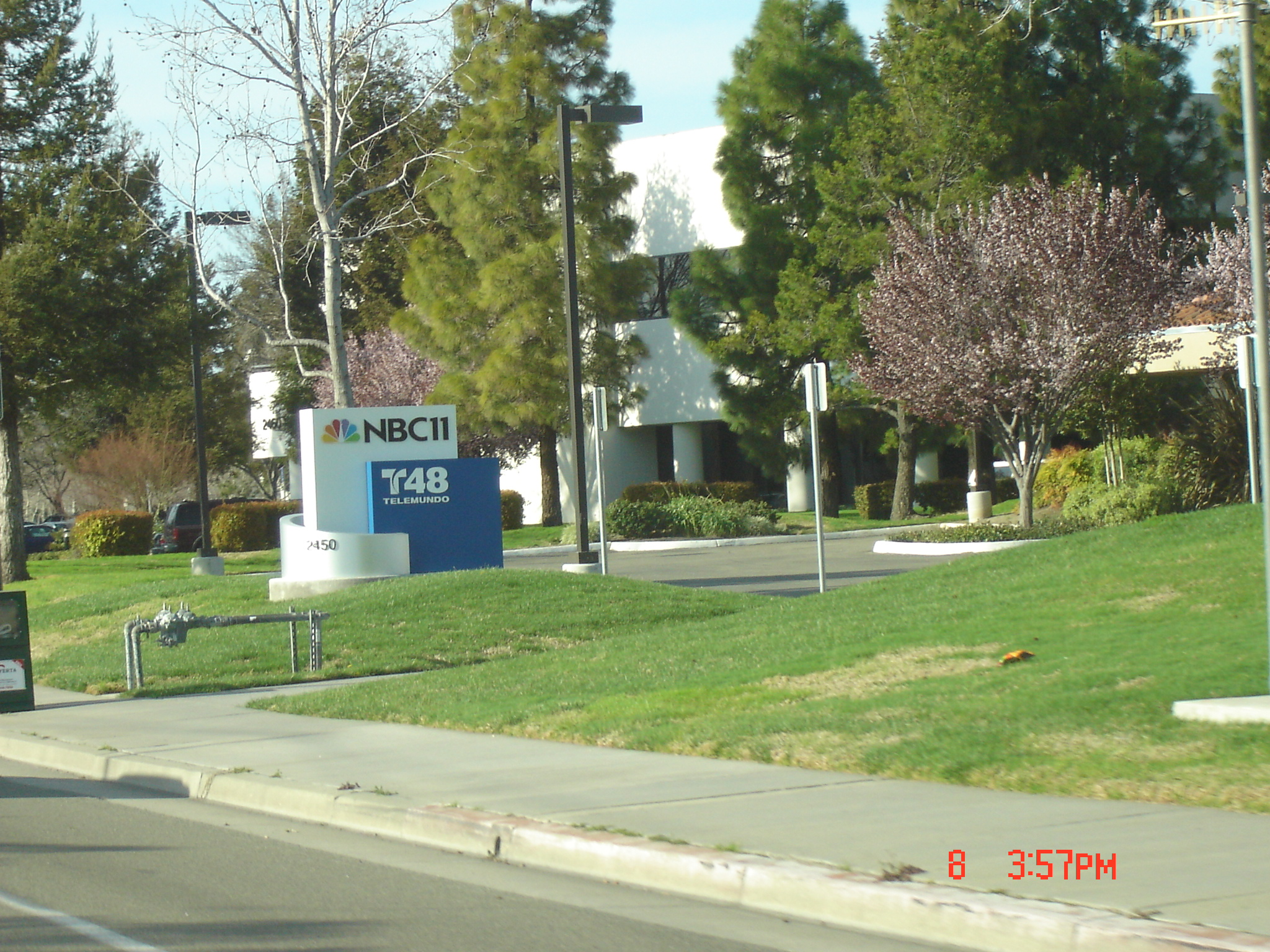
The KNTV studios in San Jose, California

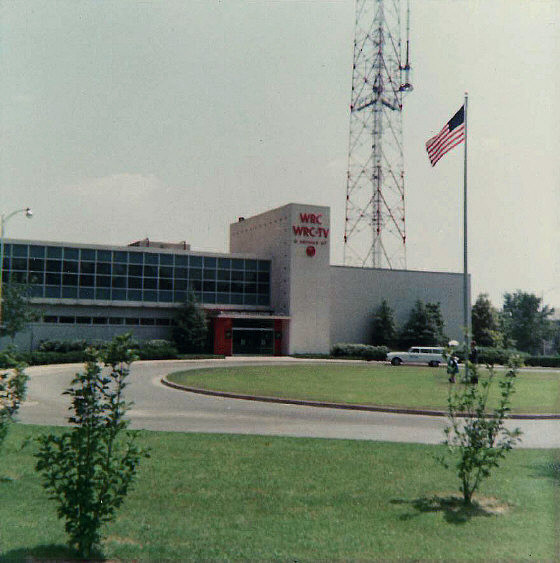
A 1962 photograph of the WRC studios in Washington, D.C.

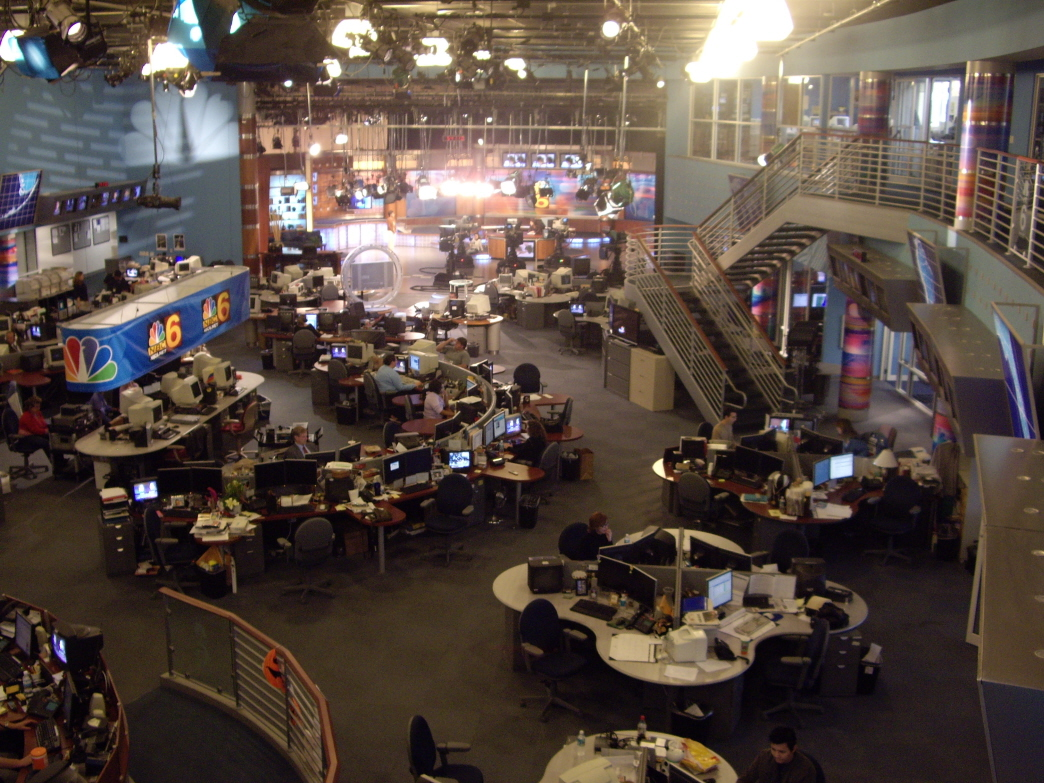
The newsroom of WTVJ in Miami

=== NBC Owned-and-Operated Stations Group ===
The NBC television network's owned-and-operated television stations group was initially formed as "NBC Owned-and-Operated Stations Group".

WNBT (now known as WNBC) in New York City, the oldest continuously operating commercial television station in the United States, first came on the air on July 1, 1941.

NBC then established four other owned-and-operated stations: WNBW (now WRC-TV) in Washington, D.C. in 1947, WNBQ (now WMAQ-TV) in Chicago and WNBK (now WKYC) in Cleveland in 1948, and KNBH (now KNBC) in Los Angeles in 1949. In May 1955, NBC agreed to trade WNBK and WTAM-AM-FM to Westinghouse in return for KYW radio and WPTZ television in Philadelphia. Although Cleveland was a top-10 television and radio market at the time, NBC had long wanted to "trade up" its holdings to a larger market. Also, Philadelphia was the largest market in which it did not own a station. The swap became official on January 22, 1956, as NBC moved its operations (including much of its Cleveland staff) to Philadelphia, with WPTZ becoming WRCV-TV. Westinghouse took over the WNBK/WTAM operation and changed its call letters to KYW-AM-FM-TV on February 13, 1956. NBC re-assumed control of the Cleveland stations on June 19, 1965. Instead of restoring the previous WNBK and WTAM identities, the stations' new call letters became WKYC-AM-FM-TV, mostly as a nod to Westinghouse's stewardship of the stations. NBC would later sell off the WKYC radio stations in 1972, 51 percent of WKYC-TV in 1990, and then the remaining 49 percent in 1999.

With the FCC encouraging the networks to expand their owned-and-operated holdings to include UHF stations, NBC purchased WBUF in Buffalo, New York, in 1955 and WKNB (now WVIT) in New Britain, Connecticut, in 1956. The network then renamed WKNB to WNBC (for New Britain, Connecticut) in 1957. But with UHF being not viable for broadcasting at the time (due to the fact that most television sets of the time were not equipped with UHF tuners), NBC shut down WBUF in 1958 and then sold the New Britain station in 1959. NBC would then re-purchase the station in New Britain, the present-day WVIT, in 1997.

General Electric bought NBC in 1986, resulting in GE's station in Denver, KCNC-TV, becoming part of NBC's owned-and-operated stations group. One year later, NBC won a bidding war to acquire WTVJ, the then-CBS affiliate in Miami. NBC had been unhappy with its longtime affiliate WSVN for heavily preempting the network's daytime lineup. However, both WTVJ's and WSVN's respective affiliation contracts with CBS and NBC did not expire until December 31, 1988. As a result, NBC faced the prospect of having to run WTVJ as a CBS affiliate for over a year. This did not sit well with either NBC or CBS, and both approached WSVN's parent Sunbeam Television about ending the station's NBC affiliation contract early. However, Sunbeam balked because they did not want to lose NBC's strong lineup of sports programming that year, including the 1988 Summer Olympics. In the aftermath, WTVJ became an NBC owned-and-operated television station, CBS took over ownership of WCIX (now WFOR-TV), and WSVN took over the Fox affiliation from WCIX. Also in 1987, General Electric transferred both KCNC-TV and WTVJ from General Electric Property Management to NBC itself, becoming an owned-and-operated TV station.

In 1994, NBC took over majority control of KUTV in Salt Lake City. That same year, the Fox Broadcasting Company agreed to a multi-year, multi-station affiliation deal with New World Communications, resulting in most of New World's stations switching to Fox. This set off the 1994–1996 United States broadcast TV realignment, a chain of affiliation changes across the country and other multi-station affiliation deals for the next couple of years. In Philadelphia, Westinghouse Broadcasting's affiliate deal with CBS resulted in a three-way transaction between Westinghouse, CBS, and NBC in 1995. Westinghouse's Philadelphia station KYW-TV switched from NBC to CBS. CBS traded its previous Philadelphia station, WCAU-TV, to NBC in return for KCNC in Denver and KUTV in Salt Lake City, while KUSA and KSL-TV affiliated with NBC. The swap in Philadelphia was delayed when CBS discovered it would face a massive capital gains tax bill if it sold WCAU to NBC outright.

In 1996, NBC bought the broadcasting holdings of The Outlet Company, bringing WCMH in Columbus, Ohio, WJAR in Providence, Rhode Island, and WNCN in Goldsboro, North Carolina into the fold. NBC also made a 1996 deal with New World to acquire KNSD in San Diego and WVTM-TV in Birmingham, Alabama.

In 1997, NBC and LIN Television Corporation formed Station Venture Holdings with LIN's KXAS in the Dallas–Fort Worth metroplex and NBC's KNSD. As part of the deal, LIN sold a controlling interest in KXAS to NBC, and NBC contributed KNSD to the resulting partnership.

In the San Francisco Bay Area, NBC had long sought to buy its affiliate KRON from the deYoung family, publishers of the San Francisco Chronicle, but the deYoungs turned down NBC's offers each time. In 1999, the deYoung family announced the liquidation of their assets, and thus the network jumped into the bidding war for KRON. NBC was seen as the frontrunner, but it was outbid at the last minute by Young Broadcasting. NBC president and chief executive officer Bob Wright had previously warned that if NBC did not succeed in buying KRON, it would require any prospective buyer to uphold specific terms if it wanted to retain the NBC affiliation. After Young won the bidding, NBC demanded yearly payments of $10 million from Young, a form of reverse compensation, instead of the then-normal mode of networks paying their affiliates. Rather than give in to NBC's demands, Young decided not to renew KRON's affiliation contract, which was set to expire at the beginning of 2002. KNTV then approached NBC with a proposal to pay $37 million annually to become the network's affiliate. NBC would then buy KNTV outright in December 2001 just before KRON's affiliation ended.

In 2004, Vivendi Universal Entertainment (a division of the French company Vivendi Universal, now Vivendi), decided to sell an 80% stake to NBC's parent company, General Electric. The sale and resulting merger formed NBC Universal. The new company was 80% owned by GE, and 20% owned by Vivendi. The television divisions of NBC and Universal Television were combined to form NBC Universal Television.

In 2006, NBC Universal sold four of its smaller-market owned-and-operated stations (WVTM, WNCN, WCMH, and WJAR) to Media General.

=== NBC Local Media ===
In November 2007, the Owned-and-Operated Stations Group changed its name to NBC Local Media.

In March 2008, NBC Local Media decided to focus on growing websites and the top ten market stations, placing WTVJ in Miami and WVIT in Hartford up for sale. Post-Newsweek Stations agreed to buy WTVJ, which would have created a duopoly between WTVJ and Post-Newsweek-owned WPLG. However, FCC ownership rules prohibited the ownership of two of the four highest-rated television stations in a single market in terms of overall audience share. With the lack of FCC approval and the poor economic conditions at the time, the WTVJ sale was canceled. WVIT also remained unsold.

LXTV was acquired in January 2008 by NBC Local Media followed in March by the purchase of Skycastle Entertainment, NBC Local Media's former outside sales and marketing firm. After NBC Weather Plus was shut down in late 2008, WNBC launched a replacement programming of local information, news and lifestyle as NBC New York Nonstop in March 2009 using LXTV programs. In January 2009, NBC Local Media and Fox Television Stations set up a local news sharing service starting with their Philadelphia stations after testing since the summer of 2008. Footage will be made available to other local media. On July 29, 2009, NBC Local Integrated Media replaced the standard station extension websites with city centric websites using nbccity.com web addresses.

In February 2010, the NBC stations launched a new website, theFeast.com, a restaurant news, blog and aggregate critic feature. Additional vertical websites were also launched including The Goods and The 20. Stations are encouraged by NBC Local Media to develop their own specialized websites. The 20 is for the top special interest articles and the Goods is a group buying website launched in May.

In late 2010 and early 2011, eight more NBC O&O stations adopted the Nonstop digital subchannel format including the three California as one network. Each stations' Nonstop subchannel has eight hours of local programming along with core programming from affiliated production companies, LXTV: Talk Stoop, First Look and Open House.

=== NBC Owned Television Stations ===
In Summer 2011, the company started to sell national advertising on behalf of affiliated cable channel, New England Cable News (NECN). In June, Local Media's new president. Valari Staab. renamed the company to NBC Owned Television Stations (NBCOTS).

On November 3, 2011, NBCOTS announced that its seven local Nonstop subchannels would become a single national network, Nonstop Network. The Network will also add its stations that currently do not have a Nonstop subchannel and beyond to other markets. An NBC executive indicated that the independent formatted Nonstop channels were doing well but needed separate 24/7 programming. The Network will have daytime retro reruns and evening lifestyle shows. Local stations will be able to pre-empt the national programming. By July 2012, NBC was also considering renaming the Network to "Bob TV" or some other name.

With Comcast purchasing controlling interest from GE of NBCUniversal in 2011, NBC stations were required by the Federal Communications Commission to develop partnership agreements with nonprofit news organizations. TheFeast website was transferred to NBCU affiliate DailyCandy.com in November. In December, four NBC stations indicated their non-profit news partners with the partnership modeled after KNSD and Voice of San Diego's preexisting one.

With the success of the NECN advertising partnership in April 2012, the division and the Comcast Sports Group extended the partnership nationwide with four additional markets where there are both a Comcast SportsNet channel and an NBC-owned station (New England, Mid-Atlantic, Northwest, and Philadelphia). On October 24, 2012, NBCOTS announced it will relaunch the NBC Nonstop network as Cozi TV, which will feature classic TV shows, movies and, original programming.

In February 2013, LIN Media pulled out of its Station Venture Operations joint venture with NBCUniversal as part of a corporate reorganization, giving NBCUniversal 100% ownership of the venture's two stations, KNSD and KXAS-TV.

In July 2013, NBCOTS and Telemundo's owned-and-operated station group were brought together under a newly formed division called NBCUniversal Owned Television Stations, headed by NBC TV Station president Valari Staab, and NECN was transferred into NBC Stations. In 2014, WKAQ, the Telemundo-owned station in San Juan, Puerto Rico, began airing a simulcast of New York City sister station WNBC on one of its digital sub-channels with the branding of NBC Puerto Rico, making WKAQ also a de facto NBC-owned station (under NBCUniversal's corporate structure, WKAQ remains as part of the Telemundo-owned stations group instead of NBCOTS).

With four NBC-owned stations already airing 4 p.m. newscasts, WNBC, KNBC, WTVJ, and WVIT also added 4 p.m. newscasts in May 2016. As of 2020, KNTV is the only NBC-owned station that does not have its own 4 p.m. news; however, it added a 4:30 p.m. newscast in September 2022.

On January 7, 2016, NBCOTS announced that it would launch an NBC-owned station in Boston, NBC Boston, on January 1, 2017, replacing affiliate WHDH. It was originally rumored that NBC would air primary on a WNEU channel, however on November 1, it was announced that NBC would use Boston-area translator WBTS-LD (acquired from WNEU's former operator ZGS Communications), with WNEU airing NBC Boston on its DT2 channel for the New Hampshire side of the DMA. After the FCC's 2016 spectrum auction, NBCOTS purchased the former WYCN-CD license which now had channel-sharing rights with WGBX yielding strong coverage in the Boston market, then reshuffled programming across NBCOTS and Telemundo Station Group assets in eastern New England, leaving NBC programming on the new WBTS-CD and returning the WNEU and WYCN-LD licenses primarily to Spanish-language programming.

== Stations ==
- Stations are listed in alphabetical order by state and city of license.
- Two boldface asterisks appearing following a station's call letters (**) indicate a station built and signed on by NBC.

=== Current ===
List of stations currently owned by NBC
Media market	State/Dist./Terr.	Station	Channel	Year affiliated	Acquired	Digital subchannels
Los Angeles	California	KNBC **	4	1949	1949	Cozi; True CRMZ; Oxygen
San Diego	California	KNSD	39	1977	1996	Cozi; True CRMZ; Oxygen
San Francisco	California	KNTV	11	2001	2002	Cozi; True CRMZ
Hartford–New Haven	Connecticut	WVIT	30	1953	1997 (Note: Previously owned by NBC from 1956 to 1960.)	Cozi; True CRMZ; Oxygen
Washington, D.C.	District of Columbia	WRC-TV **	4	1947	1947	Cozi; True CRMZ; Oxygen
Miami–Fort Lauderdale	Florida	WTVJ	6 (Note: ATSC 3.0 host station.)	1989	1987 (Note: This station was either purchased, divested or had a license swap as part of a wide-ranging September 10, 1995, trade between NBC and Westinghouse Broadcasting/CBS.)	Cozi; True CRMZ; Oxygen
Chicago	Illinois	WMAQ-TV **	5	1948	1948	Cozi; True CRMZ; Oxygen
Boston	Massachusetts	WBTS-CD **	15	2018	2018	Cozi; True CRMZ; Oxygen
New York City	New York	WNBC **	4	1941	1941	Cozi; True CRMZ; Oxygen
Philadelphia	Pennsylvania	WCAU	10	1995	1995	Cozi; True CRMZ; Oxygen
San Juan	Puerto Rico	WKAQ-DT3 (Note: Satellite of WNBC.)	2.3	2014	2014	Telemundo (main); Punto 2
Fort Worth–Dallas	Texas	KXAS-TV	5	1948	1998	Cozi; True CRMZ; Oxygen

=== Former ===
Media market	State	Station	Channel	Acquired	Sold
Birmingham	Alabama	WVTM-TV	13	1996	2006
Denver	Colorado	KCNC-TV	4	1986	1995
Buffalo	New York	WBUF-TV	17	1956	1958
Raleigh–Durham	North Carolina	WNCN	17	1996	2006
Cleveland	Ohio	WNBK **	3	1948	1956
Cleveland	Ohio	WKYC-TV	3	1965	1990
Columbus	Ohio	WCMH-TV	4	1996	2006
Philadelphia	Pennsylvania	WRCV-TV	3	1956	1965
Providence	Rhode Island	WJAR	10	1996	2006
Salt Lake City	Utah	KUTV	2	1994	1995

== Station Venture Holdings ==
Station Venture Holdings, LLC
- Type: Joint venture
- Industry: Broadcast television
- Founded: 1997; 29 years ago
- Defunct: February 2013; 13 years ago
- Headquarters: San Diego, California
- Owners: NBC (79.62%); LIN Television Corporation (20.38%)
- Divisions: Station Venture Operations, LP; KNSD; KXAS-TV; WYCN-LD (post-joint venture)

Station Venture Holdings, LLC was a joint venture between NBC and LIN Television Corporation that operated two NBC-affiliated television stations, KNSD and KXAS-TV. These stations under the joint venture were still considered owned-and-operated stations, as NBC held a majority stake in the venture. WBTS-LD (now Telemundo station WYCN-LD) was added to this venture in November 2016 as the licensee for that station.

=== History ===
The venture began in 1997 when LIN sold a controlling interest in KXAS to NBC, and NBC contributed KNSD to the resulting partnership. Owing to their controlling stake in the partnership, NBC took operational control of both stations. In February 2013, LIN pulled out of the joint venture with NBCUniversal as part of a corporate reorganization, giving NBC full ownership of KXAS and KNSD. LIN paid NBC around $100 million to allow for the transaction. The stations remain under this name for FCC licensing purposes, along with WYCN-LD.
