= LXTV =

Production unit of NBCUniversal

- Type: Company
- Industry: Television
- Founded: 2006
- Headquarters: 30 Rockefeller Plaza, New York City, New York, United States
- Products: TV shows
- Parent: NBC Owned Television Stations
- Website: www.lxtv.com

LXTV is a production unit of NBCUniversal that creates lifestyle and entertainment content. Started in 2006 by former MTV executives Morgan Hertzan and Joseph Varet as a privately owned broadband TV network and website, LXTV was acquired in January 2008 by NBC Owned Television Stations. LXTV was an early pioneer of original digital web video, which they transitioned into nationally syndicated television shows after the NBC acquisition.

Some of LXTV's programs include 1st Look, Open House, Open House NYC and George to the Rescue, which presents lifestyle programming to a young affluent audience.

LXTV also created and launched New York Live (formerly LX New York), the live, daily lifestyle show on WNBC, broadcast from Studio 3K in 30 Rockefeller Plaza and live from the streets in and around New York.

== History ==
Originally branded as Code.TV, and focused on web distribution, the production company's founders rebranded themselves as "LXTV" Before rebranding, Code.TV launched a one-time Web video following around a 23-year-old analyst named A.J. who worked at an investment bank as he went out on an extravagant night on the town, in which he described as "models and bottles." A.J.'s lavish lifestyle, colorful personality and catchphrase went viral and became instant Web fodder, getting picked up by sites like "Gawker," "New York Times" and the "New York Sun".

LXTV was acquired in January 2008 by Local Media After NBC Weather Plus was shut down in late 2008, WNBC launched a replacement programming of local information, news and livestyle as NBC New York Nonstop in March 2009 using LXTV programs. In late 2010 and early 2011, eight more NBC O&O stations adopted the Nonstop digital subchannel format including the three California as one network. Each stations' Nonstop subchannel has eight hours of local programming along with core programming from affiliated production company's, LXTV: Talk Stoop, George to the Rescue, First Look and Open House. On September 23, 2019, NBCU Owned Television Stations launched its LX digital news brand for original content for which LXTV would provide programming.
