= Silly Songs with Larry =

Regular segment in VeggieTales

Silly Songs with Larry is a regular feature segment in Big Idea's CGI cartoon series, VeggieTales. Often secular, they generally consist of Larry the Cucumber singing a humorous children's novelty song either alone or with some of the other Veggie characters. Occasionally, another character, like Mr. Lunt, Bob the Tomato, Junior Asparagus, Laura Carrot, Archibald Asparagus, Oscar the Polish Caterer, and the French Peas Jean-Claude and Philippe, or an ensemble is featured in Larry's place. The Silly Songs have proven to be a very popular part of the show, prompting the release of several "sing-along" and compilation videos of these segments, some wrapped with new material that threads them into a fresh context. Some of the Silly Songs have been nominated for a GMA Dove Award.

== Segment structure ==
Sometimes, a Silly Song is introduced with a static picture of Larry. Then, an unseen narrator, sometimes Archibald, says the following: "And now it's time for Silly Songs with Larry, the part of the show where Larry comes out and sings a silly song." However, this format is used loosely; sometimes, it is renamed, adapted to the context of the episode, or eschewed altogether.

The Silly Song, if present, always appears in the middle of an episode, usually at a cliffhanger moment or between two separate segments, and usually has nothing to do with the episode storyline. The segment occurs on the familiar countertop, which opens and closes some episodes, or is presented in another setting away from the countertop. In some videos, the background scenery often appears as a stage set, behind which electrical outlets and ceramic tile can be seen.

The song is stopped and replaced on a few occasions before it can even begin. Sometimes, when this occurs, the original song's brief images are intentionally more outlandish than usual, leaving the audience to wonder what it might have been. Examples of this happening include The Ballad of Little Joe, Madame Blueberry, Lyle the Kindly Viking, Moe and the Big Exit, Tomato Sawyer and Huckleberry Larry's Big River Rescue, and MacLarry and the Stinky Cheese Battle.

Unless pre-empted or replaced by another character, the segment typically ends with the same unseen narrator saying, "This has been Silly Songs with Larry. Tune in next time to hear Larry say/sing...."

== History ==
Phil Vischer wrote in his book, Me, Myself, and Bob: A True Story about Dreams, God, and Talking Vegetables, that when he created the Silly Songs section of the first show (Where's God When I'm S-Scared?), he never intended it to be a recurring segment, but after complaints from viewers about the lack of the segment in the second show (God Wants Me to Forgive Them!?!), he suggested that Mike Nawrocki write more Silly Songs for future shows. Since the third show (Are You My Neighbor), the segment permanently returned.

Mike Nawrocki has written and directed a majority of the Silly Songs. Kurt Heinecke has served as producer and composer for nearly all of the songs. Christian songwriter Steve Taylor wrote the 2009 Silly Song entitled "Sippy Cup."

Many of the Silly Songs such as ''The Pirates Who Don’t Do Anything'', ''His Cheeseburger'', ''The Yodeling Veterinarian of the Alps'', and ''Belly Button'' have been nominated for several GMA Dove Award including Best Music Video of the Year.

The segment was briefly discontinued after the original series ended in 2015 and was not featured in the DreamWorks spinoff series VeggieTales in the House (2014–2016) or VeggieTales in the City (2017). On his podcast (entitled The Holy Post) in late spring of 2019, Phil Vischer announced that the Silly Song segment will be returning with new songs in the new series, The VeggieTales Show (which premiered in October 2019). As of July 2025, the segments are featured on the Yippee TV streaming service.

== Songs ==
VeggieTales (1993–2015)

- "The Water Buffalo Song" (Where's God When I'm S-Scared?) Written by Phil Vischer in 1993 – Wearing an oversized cowboy hat that covers his eyes, Larry comes out and sings that "everybody's got a water buffalo," until Archibald Asparagus brings the song to an abrupt end and starts to chastise him over the falseness of his lyrics. Just as Larry starts singing that "everybody's got a baby kangaroo," Archibald is so frustrated and scared that he charges at Larry and tackles him off-screen. Covered by Superchick on the album Veggie Rocks!.
- "The Hairbrush Song" (Are You My Neighbor?) Written by Mike Nawrocki in 1995 – Larry, wearing a towel and having recently emerged from the bathtub, rues the mysterious loss of his hairbrush while hopping and dancing around in the bathroom. Pa Grape and Junior Asparagus try to help him, but it is Bob the Tomato who finally solves the mystery. "The Hairbrush Song" marks the first of many cameo appearances by The Peach, who has become a running gag character for the series. Covered by Audio Adrenaline on the album Veggie Rocks!.
- "Dance of the Cucumber" (Rack, Shack, and Benny) Written by Mike Nawrocki in 1995 – Larry, dressed up in Argentinian garb, sings and dances to a traditional ballad "in its original Spanish," while Bob, in a sheriff's hat, translates. Bob becomes annoyed, however, when Larry begins to taunt him because Bob does not dance and sing. This gets to the point in which Bob eventually snaps and chases Larry off the set with irritation. Larry, meanwhile, hopes Bob does not catch him.
- "I Love My Lips" (Dave and the Giant Pickle) Written by Mike Nawrocki in 1996 – Larry visits his psychiatrist (played by Archibald) worried about losing his lips. Because his focus on his lips is so absolute, he sees everything as a lip when given a Rorschach test. The Rorschach test in the original release featured a picture of Sonny Bono; after Sonny's death, later releases replaced the picture with a photoshopped image of Robert Ellis in 1998 along with a hand-drawn version of the same person in 2000, followed by a caricature of Mike Nawrocki in 2002. It was covered by Stevenson on the album Veggie Rocks!.
- "Oh, Santa!" (The Toy That Saved Christmas) Written by Mike Nawrocki in 1996 – While awaiting the arrival of Santa Claus on Christmas Eve, Larry is visited by a bank robber (Scallion #1), a viking (Pa Grape), and an IRS agent (the Peach), whom Larry shares his cookies with (except the IRS agent). When Santa (Bob) arrives, however, it is revealed that Larry's two guests have stolen parts of his outfit and he is fed up with it, chasing the two off the set. Larry gives the IRS agent the last cookie and says "Merry Christmas!" to both Santa and the IRS agent simultaneously and ends the song by staring at the viewer.
- "The Pirates Who Don't Do Anything" (Very Silly Songs) Written by Mike Nawrocki in 1997 – The three "infamous" pirates (played by Larry, Mr. Lunt, and Pa Grape) sing of their lack of ambition, but Larry does not seem to grasp the concept of the song. This song was covered by Relient K.
- "The Song of the Cebú" (Josh and the Big Wall!) Written by Mike Nawrocki in 1997 – In a "sequential image, stereophonic, multimedia event" (a.k.a. a slide projector and a bed sheet), Larry presents the audience (Junior and the Gourds) with a song and slide show about a boy who owns three Cebús and a hippo, though due to an error by the Photo Booth Larry occasionally dives off-topic, leading Archibald to continually critique the presentation. As Junior and the two Gourds (Jimmy and Jerry) leave, Jimmy and Jerry talk about wanting their money back and how unfulfilling the presentation was.
- "His Cheeseburger" (Madame Blueberry) Written by Mike Nawrocki in 1998 – Larry is about to introduce a new Silly Song when Archibald announces the cancellation of his segment as a result of the disastrous outcome of "The Song of the Cebu". He then gives Mr. Lunt a chance to sing a song in his own segment, Love Songs with Mr. Lunt. During the segment, Mr. Lunt sings of Jerry Gourd's unrequited love for a cheeseburger in this ballad. At Archibald's assumption Mr. Lunt was going to sing about "growing up in Connecticut," Mr. Lunt clarifies he "grew up in New Jersey." It is included on WOW 1999. This song is covered by Tait on the album Veggie Rocks!.
- "The Yodeling Veterinarian of the Alps" (The End of the Silliness) Written by Mike Nawrocki in 1998 – Larry introduces this Silly Song after getting his Silly Songs with Larry segment back following a petition. Narrated in song by a barbershop quartet (consisting of the Scallions and Frankencelery), Larry is portrayed as a doctor who believes he is able to cure sick pets simply by yodeling to them. Meanwhile, his nurse (Pa Grape) is slipping prescriptions to the pets' owners behind his back. After refusing to give the nurse a raise, Larry realizes the painful truth of the inadequacy of his singing when a bear stuck in a trap is entirely unaffected by his treatment and runs amok.
- "Endangered Love" aka Barbara Manatee (King George and the Ducky) Written by Mike Nawrocki in 2000 – While watching the television soap opera, Endangered Love, Larry sings of his love for the main character, a manatee, while dancing with a stuffed manatee doll. Meanwhile, onscreen, the story of lovers Barbara and Bill is told. However, the song is abruptly stopped when Bob interrupts Larry mid-song and suggests he reads a book.
- "Larry's High Silk Hat" (Lyle the Kindly Viking) Written by Marc Vulcano in 2001 – A new Silly Song is about to be introduced when Archibald intervenes and interrupts the segment, calling on the French Peas Philippe and Jean-Claude, who slide the title card for a segment known as Classy Songs with Larry in, before he begins introducing the new segment. During the new segment, Archibald and Larry sing to the tune of Funiculì, Funiculà. At the same time, Larry expresses his joy at having a lovely stovepipe hat and a box of chocolates while sitting at a trolley stop having to contend with nosy people (Art Bigotti, Mr. Nezzer, Miss Achmetha, Apollo Gourd, and Scallion #1) in the hot sun.
- "Do The Moo Shoo" (The Ultimate Silly Song Countdown) Written by Mike Nawrocki in 2001 – As Pirate Pa fixes the Astonishing Contraption of Silliness after it breaks down, Pirate Larry and Pirate Lunt make up a Silly Song on the fly from a Chinese food menu.
- "Belly Button" (The Ballad of Little Joe) Written by Mike Nawrocki in 2003 – In the introduction to this song, the boy band Boyz in the Sink (Mr. Lunt, Larry, Jimmy Gourd, and Junior Asparagus) dramatically state their intent to be "serious" artists. During the song, Mr. Lunt admits that he lacks a bellybutton and he goes to the hospital to see the doctor and the nurse (Khalil the Caterpillar and Miss Achmetha) for help. The song is a direct parody of O-Town, and the band itself is named after Boyz n the Hood. This is the first Silly Song not being shot on the normal countertop stage.
- "Sport Utility Vehicle" (A Snoodle's Tale) Written by Mike Nawrocki in 2004 – Larry and Miss Achmetha sing of their admiration for each other's SUVs, but stuck in their sedentary lifestyles, they can only dream of going off-road and performing daring rescues.
- "Schoolhouse Polka" (Sumo of the Opera) Written by Mike Nawrocki in 2004 – Presented as "Schoolhouse Polka with Larry". In a parody of the Schoolhouse Rock! series, Larry plays the accordion and sings a song about homophones to the tune "Oklahoma", the title song from the play/film Oklahoma! However, he gets exhausted and tries to go off-screen, but the announcer keeps bringing him back to sing more including prepositions, pronouns, and adjectives until the song comes to a close.
- "The Blues With Larry" (Duke and the Great Pie War) Written by Mike Nawrocki in 2005 – Larry enthusiastically tries his hand at singing the blues, but lacks the necessary life experiences as his version of the Blues is filled with sunshine and happiness. A professional blues singer named Blind Lemon Lincoln tries to help by making Larry sad so he will get it right, but there is always something that makes Larry happy again. A dejected Lemon eventually gives up, and the song ends with Larry joining a polka player, Oscar The Polish Caterer. This song is set to the tune of "Santa Claus Is Back In Town".
- "Pizza Angel" (Minnesota Cuke and the Search for Samson's Hairbrush) Written by Tim Hodge in 2005 – Larry is awaiting his pizza delivery, which is hours late, and sings a desperate, 1950s-style, love ballad as he waits. When the pizza finally comes, it turns out that the box is empty. The pizza delivery guy (played by Jimmy Gourd) explains that he was unable to locate Larry's house because the address number on Larry's door broke off, and that because he was starting to get hungry, he also ate Larry's pizza out of gluttony.
- "My Baby Elf" (Lord of the Beans) Written by Mike Nawrocki in 2005 – presented as "Silly Songs with Elves, the part of the show where Ear-a-Corn comes out and sings a Silly Song for Elves". Ear-a-Corn (Larry, dressed as Elvis Presley with elf ears) sings a song about an elvish girl, whose disdain for Ear-a-Corn is mistranslated by him as compliments. Leg-o-Lamb (Jimmy Gourd) interrupts near the end, pulling Ear-a-Corn's fake ears off and accusing Ear-a-Corn of being an "elvish impersonator".
- "Gated Community" (Sheerluck Holmes and the Golden Ruler) Written by Mike Nawrocki in 2006 – Larry's ball bounces over the wall of a gated community. Instead of helping him, the residents of the community sing about how lovely life is there, much to Larry's chagrin. The song ends with the residents finally throwing the ball back.
- "Lance the Turtle" (Gideon Tuba Warrior) Written by Tim Hodge in 2006 – With Larry dressed as a pirate, the French Peas force Bob to stand in with a replacement segment called "Ukulele Karaoke with Bob". Confused and completely unprepared, Bob sings the lyrics to his backup singers, "The Wiggly Turtle Toobies" (a trio of peas perched on turtle-shaped cut-outs). When the song progresses, Bob accidentally shreds his paper of lyrics through a fan, forcing the Peas to hastily tape the lyrics back together – thus creating completely nonsensical lyrics.
- "A Mess Down In Egypt" (Moe and the Big Exit) Written by Mike Nawrocki in 2007 – The Boyz in the Sink' return and interrupt the Silly Songs with Larry narrator to allow them to tell the Moses story in their own way. However, Bob comes in and tells them that the show is sticking with its own Western version of the story.
- "Monkey" (The Wonderful Wizard of Ha's) Written by Andrew Peterson and Randall Goodgame in 2007 – While on a photo safari, Larry continually repeats what he heard from an "expert" about the difference between monkeys and apes ("if it has a tail then it's a monkey, if it doesn't have a tail then it's an ape"), applying such logic to everything he sees. Bob repeatedly tries to correct Larry, but after Larry mistakenly identifies a cow as a monkey, Bob gives up in disappointment by saying that he and Larry do not have tails, but Larry utters some disagreement which Bob does not understand and it is later revealed that Bob does have a tail.
- "The Biscuit of Zazzamarandabo" (Tomato Sawyer and Huckleberry Larry's Big River Rescue) Written by Andrew Peterson and Randall Goodgame in 2008 – When Larry forgets to write a silly song, and a panic attack between him, Bob, and the Narrator ensues, Archibald jumps in with a song of his own. In the song, Larry, Archibald, Pa Grape, Mr. Lunt, and the French Peas go on a journey to see the famed "Biscuit of Zazzamarandabo." However, Larry (the driver) is constantly stopping to get something, frustrating Archibald. After a long journey (in which they first accidentally end up at the "Biscuit of Doug") and with 0.01 miles left to the Biscuit of Zazzamarandabo, they turn around to take a "potty break", with the nearest restroom 57 miles in the opposite direction. In the end, when they cue the title card, Larry comments to Archibald: "I always thought you were the announcer." Archibald relies, "So did I..."
- "Sneeze if You Need To!" (Abe and the Amazing Promise) Written by Andrew Peterson and Randall Goodgame in 2009 – Bob needs to sneeze and visits the Sneeze Doctor (Larry) who tries multiple methods (potpourri, flowers, bright light, a bowling ball, and a toilet plunger) to get Bob to sneeze. Eventually, a cat comes along, which makes Bob sneeze. He is relieved, but then starts sneezing uncontrollably. Meanwhile, the nurse (Mr. Lunt) shares trivia about sneezing.
- "Sippy Cup" (Minnesota Cuke and the Search for Noah's Umbrella) Written by Steve Taylor and Mike Nawrocki in 2009 – Larry goes to a fancy restaurant and asks for a glass of water. The waiter (Mr. Lunt) refuses because Larry has spilled several times in the past and ultimately forces Larry to use a sippy cup. Larry tries to argue his case with the waiter, busboy (Jimmy), and maître d' (Madame Blueberry), but they insist that Larry use the sippy cup. When a courtroom judge (Mr. Nezzer) is about to pass the sippy cup sentence, the governor calls in and says that Larry was granted a "sippy-stay." The waiter then serves Larry grape juice in a glass, which he promptly spills. When the title card appears again, Larry says he will take the sippy cup.
- "Donuts for Benny" (Saint Nicholas: A Story of Joyful Giving) Written by Mike Nawrocki in 2009 – Presented as "Helpful Humanitarian Songs with Mr. Lunt", Mr. Lunt sings about Benny, a poor old mutt who sits outside a donut shop and begs for donuts. At Mr. Lunt's urging, passersby keep giving Benny donuts, but Mr. Lunt learns the hard ways that dogs should not be fed donuts when Benny twice gives a hyperactive rendition of "Waltz Me Around Again, Willie".
- "Where Have All the Staplers Gone?" (Pistachio - The Little Boy That Woodn't) Written by Mike Nawrocki and Kurt Heniecke in 2010 – Presented as "Obscure Broadway Show Tunes with Larry", Larry and Petunia lament the displacement of various office supplies and reminisce about the time when they were plentiful in this parody of the folk song Where Have All the Flowers Gone?. In the end, the narrator promotes Act 2, "Revenge of the Staplers".
- "Pants" (Sweetpea Beauty) Written by Ian Eskelin and Douglas McKelvey in 2010 – Presented as a "Veggie Shopping Network" infomercial. Larry and Pa Grape sell pants to viewers while Jimmy and Jerry Gourd show them off on stilts.
- "Goodnight Junior" (It's a Meaningful Life) Written by Mike Nawrocki in 2010 – Presented as "Bedtime Songs with Junior", Junior is revealed to be a spoiled brat, as he proceeds to continuously and unreasonably nag Lisa Asparagus to get him all the plushes he needed for bedtime.
- "Hopperena" (Twas The Night Before Easter) Written by Mike Nawrocki in 2011 – Presented as "The Latest Dance Craze with Jean-Claude and Philippe", the French Peas invent a new dance craze (a spoof of the Macarena), which Archibald becomes a big fan of.
- "Astonishing Wigs!" (Princess and the Popstar) Written by Mike Nawrocki in 2011 – In an installment of "The History of Fashion with Archibald", Archibald, Madame Blueberry, Jimmy Gourd, Mr. Lunt, and a pack of singing pigs sing about wigs. This song loosely ties to the feature by occurring after a scene where Princess Poppyseed and popstar Vanna Banana exchange clothes, including Vanna's wig, in a vain attempt to switch lives.
- "The Eight Polish Foods Of Christmas" (The Little Drummer Boy) Written by Mike Nawrocki (recorded in 1996, animated in 2011)– At "A VeggieTales Christmas Party", Oscar the Polish Caterer arrives to serve his filling cuisine (sung to "The 12 Days of Christmas"). Originally recorded for the "A Very Veggie Christmas" album, this is its first appearance in video form.
- "Bubble Rap" (Robin Good and The Not-So-Merry Men and If I Sang a Silly Song) Written by Mike Nawrocki in 2012 – The Boyz in the Sink perform a song about the wonders of bubble wrap. Originally, a song called "Tornado Hunters" was going to appear on this episode, but it was scrapped due to a giant tornado striking the southern United States during the episode's production so it was replaced by this Silly Song.
- "Best Friends Forever" (The Penniless Princess) Written by Mike Nawrocki in 2012 – Laura and another girl text each other about being friends forever on the internet talk.
- "Supper Hero" (The League of Incredible Vegetables) Written by Mike Nawrocki in 2012 – Jimmy Gourd (dressed as the Supper Hero) eats the whole league's supper (including their chocolate cake).
- "Happy Tooth Day" – (The Little House That Stood) Written by Mike Nawrocki in 2013 – Larry sings about having his one tooth, and has a celebration for the tooth.
- "Kilts and Stilts" (MacLarry and the Stinky Cheese Battle) Written by Mike Nawrocki in 2013 – Larry and Scooter interrupt the narrator to begin a segment of "Silly Songs with Scottish Larry". The song begins Larry standing on stilts while singing in a Scottish accent, while Scottish food, music, quilting, and kilts are also mentioned. However, the French Peas interrupt the song to change the background, prompting Larry and his friends to sing similar verses about Ireland, England and the United States, much to the dismay of Scooter, who eventually faints.
- "Wrapped Myself Up for Christmas" (Merry Larry and the Light of Christmas) Written by Mike Nawrocki in 2013 – Larry accidentally wraps himself, Bob, Jean-Claude, Phillipe, and Pa Grape in wrapping paper. Junior unwraps them (with the exception of Pa, who remains unseen until the end of the Silly Song).
- "Asteroid Cowboys" (Veggies in Space: The Fennel Frontier) Written by Mike Nawrocki in 2014 – Larry, Junior, and Jimmy sing about their lives as asteroid herders.
- "Perfect Puppy" (Celery Night Fever) Written by Len Uhley, Dave Kinnoin, and Jimmy Hammer in 2014 – Larry wants a puppy, but is having a hard time deciding what breed is perfect for him. He is taken to the kennel by Bob and ends up choosing a puppy which bears a strange resemblance to himself.
- "Macaroni and Cheese" (Beauty and the Beet) Written by Len Uhley, Dave Kinnoin, and Jimmy Hammer in 2014 – A parody of Romeo and Juliet. Larry describes in the operatic form how his Italian ancestors, the rival Cucaroni and Cumbarizzi families, invented Macaroni and Cheese when his great (etc.) grandmother Maria, and great (etc.) grandfather Tony, accidentally crashed their cheese and macaroni carts into each other.
- "My Golden Egg" (Noah's Ark) Written by Len Uhley, Dave Kinnoin, and Jimmy Hammer in 2015 – An Easter egg hunt is enjoyed by Junior, Laura, and Larry. Larry sings about a special golden egg that he wants to find by imagining himself on a jungle adventure. Laura finds the Golden egg first, but she shares her egg with Larry in the end.

The VeggieTales Show (2019–present)

- "The Agitated Song" (A Lifetime Supply of Joy) Written by Guy Vasilovich in 2020 – As the cast takes a brief intermission from the play of Paul and Silas, Larry becomes extremely agitated at Archibald for leaving the story on a cliffhanger. Bob then forces Larry to perform a silly song for the audience during intermission, but Larry becomes extremely agitated at the cast and sings the shortest silly song in VeggieTales history.
- "Amazing Glazed" (It's Cool to be Kind) Written by Mike Nawrocki in 2020 – Larry sings a western ballad about Billy the Doughnut puppet. Billy is in love with Mary-Joe Cruller. However, Mary-Joe literally has a hole where her heart should be.
- "Wanna Wallaby" (Little Things Matter) Written by Phil Vischer in 2020 – Larry sings about his desire to be an Australian Wallaby, but his excessive kicking has Archibald intervene and end the song.
- "Oh Pluto" (Being Gentle Makes You Great) Written by Phil Vischer in 2020 – Larry sings about where the planet Pluto has gone, until Archibald intervenes after the song ends, stating that Pluto is a dwarf planet.
- "Tooth Sweater" (The Giving-est Day) Written by Phil Vischer in 2021 – Larry sings about tooth sweaters, sweaters that cover your teeth. Bob later interrupts the song, stating that other parts of Larry's body aren't covered up, like his eyes. When Larry covers them up with eye sweaters, it causes him to lose his vision and make chaos in the silly song's set.
- "Sleep Singing" (The Good Shepherd) – written by Mike Nawrocki in 2021– Larry, Jimmy, and Mr. Lunt all sing about Bob's activities while he sleepwalks, which include singing, eating from the trash, and dancing. Bob later wakes up from his trance, and wonders what happened in his sleep.
- "Alligator Family" ("The One and Only You") – written by Phil Vischer in 2021– After being attacked by an alligator in the previous sketch of the show, Bob gets the alligator in the crate and is about to take him to a zoo. However, Bob is interrupted by Larry who wants to keep the alligator and make it a part of his family.

Unreleased Silly Songs

- "Tornado Hunters" – written by Mike Nawrocki and Phil Vischer (conceived sometime between 1984 and 1986, animated in 2011) – Larry, Jimmy, and Mr. Nezzer give a public service announcement about being world famous tornado hunters that catch tornados in their butterfly nets while dodging the debris. This song was originally written when VeggieTales creators Vischer and Nawrocki first met in their freshman year of college. During a campus wide tornado warning, the two grabbed safari hats, went outside in the rainstorm, and threw toilet paper rolls in the air to capture the tornado in their garbage bags. This Silly Song was originally animated for the show 'Princess and the Popstar' in 2011 (to fit with the midwest location of that show.) It was pulled from the show and replaced with Astonishing Wigs at the last minute due to the sensitivity of the 2011 tornado storms in the southern region of the United States. The plan was to release it the following year with the show entitled 'Robin Good' (2012). It was pulled again out of respect for those who've suffered the effects of the 2012 tornado season. The song was replaced by fan written song Bubble Rap. A rare short ten-second clip without audio was leaked onto all of the copies of the Robin Good and His Not So Merry Man DVD in 2012. Another seven-second clip of the song was featured in the Huhu Animation Studio's 2013 show reel. It would not be released to the public until October 2024, after a fan of VeggieTales on YouTube received a copy of the full song from anonymous crew members that worked at Big Idea.

== Albums ==
Title	Album details	Peak chart positions	
Title	Album details	US Indie	US Kid
And Now It's Time for Silly Songs with Larry	Released September 18, 2001; Labels: Action Music	13	2
25 Favorite Silly Songs!	Released: July 16, 2011	—	25

== Videos ==
Title	Year
A Very Silly Sing-Along!	1997
Silly Sing-Along 2: The End of Silliness?!?	1998
The Ultimate Silly Song Countdown	2001
If I Sang A Silly Song	2012
Silly Songs With Larry: The Complete Collection	2013
