= Lunt (disambiguation) =

Lunt is a village in Sefton, Merseyside, England.

Lunt may also refer to:

- Lunt (surname)
- The Lunt, a residential area within the city of Wolverhampton, England
- Roman fort at The Lunt, also called the Lunt Roman fort, an ancient Roman fort in Baginton, Warwichshire, England
- Lunt-Fontanne Theatre, a theatre in New York City
- Lunt Silversmiths, an American manufacturer of fine sterling, silver-plate and stainless steel flatware
- Mr. Lunt, a character from the Christian children's series VeggieTales
- Cornelius Van Lunt, a character in Marvel Comics books
- The Lunt, a wooded escapement on the bank of the River Sowe, near to the Roman fort at The Lunt
