= Larryboy =

Larryboy (also known as LarryBoy or Larry-Boy) may refer to:

- Larryboy, an alter ego of Larry the Cucumber in several episodes of VeggieTales and sequels
- Larryboy: The Cartoon Adventures, an animated series based on the Larryboy character
