= Boyz in the Sink =

Fictional band in VeggieTales

- The band as they appear in the music video for "Belly Button"

Background information
- Origin: VeggieTales
- Years active: 2003–2007, 2012
- Labels: Big Idea Entertainment, Bob and Larry Records
- Members: Larry the Cucumber; Junior Asparagus; Jimmy Gourd; Mr. Lunt

Boyz in the Sink is a fictional band of VeggieTales characters who first appeared in the 2003 Silly Songs with Larry segment of The Ballad of Little Joe. The band subsequently appeared in 2007's Moe and the Big Exit and 2012's If I Sang A Silly Song and Robin Good and The Not-So-Merry Men.

The members of the band are Larry the Cucumber, Mr. Lunt, Junior Asparagus, and Jimmy Gourd. The foursome and their name are parodies of boy-bands such as Backstreet Boys and NSYNC.

The band's only album, Boyz in the Sink, was released by EMI and Big Idea Productions on October 3, 2006. It peaked in 2007 at #10 on the Billboard Top Kid Audio chart and features many covers of songs from VeggieTales.

== Other media ==
Big Idea released a jigsaw puzzle featuring Boyz in the Sink. Boyz in the Sink also appear on the 2006 Big Idea release VeggieTales Worship Songs. The band was featured as part of 2005's "VeggieTales Rockin' Tour LIVE", the second traveling stage show featuring VeggieTales music and characters.
