= VeggieTales discography =

The following is a list of albums released with songs from or based on the animated series VeggieTales.

== 1990s ==
=== VeggieTunes (1995) ===
VeggieTunes

Soundtrack album by VeggieTales
- Released: November 21, 1995; July 21, 1998
- Recorded: 1993–1995
- Genre: Children's music
- Length: 24:34
- Producers: Kurt Heinecke, Mike Nawrocki

VeggieTunes is the debut album by Big Idea, originally released in 1995.

==== Track listing ====
1. VeggieTales Theme Song
2. God is Bigger (Than the Boogie Man) (from Where's God when I'm S-Scared?)
3. The Water Buffalo Song (from Where's God when I'm S-Scared?)
4. King Darius Suite (from Where's God when I'm S-Scared?)
5. Oh, No! What We Gonna Do? (from Where's God when I'm S-Scared?)
6. We've Got Some News (from Where's God when I'm S-Scared?)
7. Fear Not, Daniel (from Where's God when I'm S-Scared?)
8. You Were in His Hand (from Where's God when I'm S-Scared?)
9. We Are The Grapes of Wrath (from God Wants Me to Forgive Them!?!)
10. Some Veggies Went to Sea (from God Wants Me to Forgive Them!?!)
11. The Forgiveness Song (from God Wants Me to Forgive Them!?!)
12. Busy, Busy (from Are you my Neighbor?)
13. Love Your Neighbor (from Are you my Neighbor?)
14. The Hairbrush Song (from Are you my Neighbor?)
15. I Can Be Your Friend (from Are you my Neighbor?)
16. What We Have Learned (God Wants Me to Forgive Them!?! version)

=== A Very Veggie Christmas (1996) ===
A Very Veggie Christmas

Soundtrack album by VeggieTales
- Released: October 22, 1996; October 6, 1998
- Recorded: 1995–1996
- Genres: Children's music, Christmas
- Length: 40:49
- Label: Big Idea
- Producers: Kurt Heinecke, Mike Nawrocki, Phil Vischer

A Very Veggie Christmas is the second album by Big Idea, originally released in November 1996.

==== Track listing ====
1. Talking
2. Feliz Navidad
3. More Talking
4. The Boar's Head Carol
5. Still More Talking
6. Ring, Little Bells
7. Vegetables Talking
8. Go Tell It on the Mountain
9. More Vegetables Talking
10. Angels We Have Heard On High
11. Vegetables Talking About Watching A Video
12. Can't Believe It's Christmas (from The Toy That Saved Christmas)
13. Vegetables Talking During A Video
14. Grumpy Kids (from The Toy That Saved Christmas)
15. More Talking
16. Oh Santa! (from The Toy That Saved Christmas)
17. Even More Talking
18. He Is Born, The Holy Child
19. Vegetables Talking To Sheep
20. While by My Sheep
21. Vegetables Talking to a Polish Caterer
22. The 8 Polish Foods Of Christmas
23. Vegetables Tire Of Talking
24. The Big Medley! (Joy to the World/Oh Little Town/O Come Oh Ye Thankful)
25. The End of the Talking!
26. Away in a Manger

=== VeggieTunes 2 (1998) ===
VeggieTunes 2

Soundtrack album by VeggieTales
- Released: May 20, 1998
- Recorded: 1993 (track 20); 1993–1994 (track 1); 1995–1997 (tracks 2–19)
- Genre: Children's music
- Length: 37:51
- Producer: Kurt Heinecke

VeggieTunes 2 is an album released by Big Idea on May 20, 1998.

==== Track listing ====
1. VeggieTales Theme Song
2. Dance of the Cucumber
3. Good Morning George (The Chocolate Factory)
4. Think Of Me
5. The Bunny Song (reprise)
6. The Bunny Song (New & Improved)
7. Stand Up!
8. Stand Up! (Reprise)
9. Love My Lips
10. Big Things Too
11. The Pirates Who Don't Do Anything
12. It's Laura's Fault
13. LarryBoy Theme Song
14. The Promise Land
15. The Lord Has Given
16. Keep Walking
17. The Lord Has Given (Reprise)
18. The Promise Land (Reprise)
19. The Song of the Cebú
20. What Have We Learned

=== Larry-Boy The Soundtrack (1999) ===
Larry-Boy The Soundtrack

Soundtrack album by VeggieTales
- Released: July 27, 1999
- Recorded: 1997–1999
- Genre: Children's music
- Length: 43 minutes
- Label: Big Idea

Larry-Boy The Soundtrack is an album released by Big Idea on July 27, 1999. It features songs and score from Larry-Boy! And The Fib From Outer Space! and Larry-Boy and the Rumor Weed.

==== Track listing ====
1. Cordial Greetings from Alfred
2. A Fib Falls and It's Laura's Fault
3. The Search and It's Lenny's Fault
4. A Fib Grows and The Water Tower
5. Junior Tells The Truth!
6. Look Who's Here To Help
7. Bumblyburg Groove Remix (Larry-Boy Theme Song)
8. Bumblyburg Slim Down Remix (Larry-Boy Theme Song)
9. Thanks But No Thanks
10. Rumor Weed Introduction
11. The Seed Is Planted and the Rumor Spreads
12. The Rumor Weed Song
13. Larry-Boy to the Rescue
14. The Sewer and Town Square
15. The Confession and the Bloom
16. It's The W's
17. The Rumor Weed Song (W's Version)
18. Ta Ta!
19. Larry-Boy Theme Song (Original)

== 2000s ==
=== VeggieTunes: A Queen, A King and A Very Blue Berry (2000) ===
VeggieTunes: A Queen, A King and A Very Blue Berry

Soundtrack album by VeggieTales
- Released: October 31, 2000
- Recorded: 1993 (track 18); 1993–1994 (track 1); 1998–2000 (tracks 2–17)
- Genre: Children's music
- Length: 40:15
- Label: Big Idea
- Producers: Kurt Heinecke, Mike Nawrocki

VeggieTunes: A Queen, A King and A Very Blue Berry is an album released by Big Idea on October 31, 2000.

==== Track listing ====
1. VeggieTales Theme Song
2. I'm So Blue (from Madame Blueberry)
3. Stuff-Mart Suite (from Madame Blueberry)
4. Salesmunz Rap (from Madame Blueberry)
5. Thankfulness Song (from Madame Blueberry)
6. Stuff Stuff, Mart Mart (The Blue Danube)
7. His Cheeseburger (Love Songs with Mr. Lunt) (from Madame Blueberry)
8. The Yodeling Veterinarian of the Alps (from The End of Silliness?)
9. I Love My Duck (from King George and the Ducky)
10. I Must Have It (from King George and the Ducky)
11. There Once Was a Man (from King George and the Ducky)
12. The Selfish Song (from King George and the Ducky)
13. Endangered Love (Barbara Manatee) (from King George and the Ducky)
14. The Battle Prelude (from Esther: The Girl Who Became Queen)
15. Haman's Song (from Esther: The Girl Who Became Queen)
16. The Battle Is Not Ours (from Esther: The Girl Who Became Queen)
17. Lost Puppies (from Esther: The Girl Who Became Queen)
18. What Have We Learned

=== Silly Songs with Larry (2001) ===
Silly Songs with Larry

Soundtrack album by VeggieTales
- Released: September 18, 2001
- Recorded: 1993–2001
- Genre: Children's music
- Length: 43:20
- Label: Big Idea
- Producers: Kurt Heinecke, Mike Nawrocki

Silly Songs with Larry is an album released by Big Idea on September 18, 2001. It features all the silly songs ever made up until Lyle the Kindly Viking.

==== Track listing ====
1. The Water Buffalo Song (from Where's God When I'm S-Scared?)
2. The Hairbrush Song (from Are You my Neighbor?)
3. Dance of the Cucumber (from Rack, Shack, and Benny)
4. I Love My Lips (from Dave and the Giant Pickle)
5. The Pirates Who Don't Do Anything (from Very Silly Songs!/A Very Silly Sing-Along!)
6. The Song of the Cebú (from Josh and the Big Wall)
7. His Cheeseburger (Love Songs with Mr. Lunt) (from Madame Blueberry)
8. The Yodeling Veterinarian of the Alps (from The End of Silliness?)
9. Endangered Love (Barbara Manatee) (from King George and the Ducky)
10. Larry's High Silk Hat (Classy Songs with Larry [Silly Songs with Larry at the Beginning]) (from Lyle the Kindly Viking)
11. Lost Puppies (from Esther: The Girl Who Became Queen)
12. Oh, Santa! (from The Toy that Saved Christmas)
13. Do the Moo Shoo (from The Ultimate Silly Song Countdown)
14. Silly Song Remix Medley

=== Bob and Larry's Sunday Morning Songs (2002) ===
Bob and Larry's Sunday Morning Songs

Soundtrack album by VeggieTales
- Released: May 21, 2002
- Recorded: 2001–2002
- Genre: Children's music
- Length: 67:05
- Label: Big Idea

Bob and Larry's Sunday Morning Songs is an album released by Big Idea on May 21, 2002. This is an album in the Sing-Alongs series.

1. This Little Light of Mine
2. Down in My Heart
3. He's Got the Whole Word in his Hands
4. My God is So Big
5. The B-I-B-L-E
6. Joshua Fought the Battle of Jericho
7. God's Way
8. Over, Over
9. Zacchaeus was a wee little Man
10. This is My Commandment
11. Love Your Neighbor
12. Give Me Oil in My Lamp
13. I Believe God Can
14. Peace Like a River
15. Jesus Loves the Little Children
16. Split-Tracks (tracks 16-30 repeat in karaoke version)

=== Junior's Bedtime Songs (2002) ===
Junior's Bedtime Songs

Soundtrack album by VeggieTales
- Released: May 21, 2002
- Recorded: 2001–2002
- Genre: Children's music
- Length: 71:21
- Label: Big Idea

Junior's Bedtime Songs is an album released by Big Idea on May 21, 2002.

1. Twinkle, Twinkle Little Star
2. Braham's Lullaby
3. A Bushel and a Peck
4. Close to You
5. Are You Sleeping?
6. My Day
7. Thankfulness Song
8. God is So Good
9. God's Love
10. Love Him in the Morning
11. Corner of the World
12. One in a Million
13. Think Of Me (from Rack, Shack & Benny)
14. All Through the Night
15. Angels Will Keep Watch
16. Split-Tracks (tracks 16-30 repeat in karaoke version)

=== Jonah A Veggietales Movie Original Movie Soundtrack (2002) ===
Jonah A Veggietales Movie Original Movie Soundtrack

Soundtrack album by VeggieTales
- Released: August 27, 2002
- Recorded: 2001–2002
- Genre: Children's music
- Length: 46:50
- Labels: Big Idea, ForeFront Records (Track 9)

Jonah A Veggietales Movie Original Movie Soundtrack is an album released by Big Idea on August 27, 2002.

==== Track listing ====
1. Billy Joe McGuffrey
2. Bald Bunny
3. Steak and Shrimp
4. The Pirates Who Don't Do Anything
5. Message From The Lord
6. It Cannot Be
7. Second Chances (Anointed)
8. Jonah Was A Prophet
9. In The Belly of the Whale (Newsboys)
10. Billy Joe McGuffrey (Chris Rice)
11. The Pirates Who Don't Do Anything (Relient K)
12. Opening Titles
13. The Joppa Market
14. Jonah Meets The Pirates
15. The Dream/Cards at Sea
16. Jonah Meets The Whale
17. Nineveh
18. On The Hill
19. Credits Song

=== Pirates' Boat Load of Fun (2002) ===
Pirates' Boat Load of Fun

Soundtrack album by VeggieTales
- Released: October 8, 2002
- Recorded: 2001–2002
- Genre: Children's music
- Length: 70:50
- Label: Big Idea

Pirates' Boat Load of Fun is an album released by Big Idea on October 8, 2002.

==== Track listing ====
1. The Slowest Ship on the Ocean
2. Sailing, Sailing/Row, Row, Row Your Boat
3. Get On Board
4. Deep And Wide
5. Did You Ever See A Lassie/My Ducky Lies Over The Ocean
6. She'll Be Coming' Round The Mountain
7. There's a Hole in the Bottom of the Sea
8. Modern Major General
9. The Ballad Of Jonah
10. Who Did Swallow Jonah!
11. The Wonder Of It All
12. We're Vikings
13. That's Where My Treasure Is
14. Wide As The Ocean
15. Erie Canal
16. Split-Tracks (tracks 16-30 repeat with music and voices split)

=== Bob and Larry's Backyard Party (2002) ===
Bob and Larry's Backyard Party

Soundtrack album by VeggieTales
- Released: October 8, 2002
- Recorded: 2001–2002
- Genre: Children's music
- Length: 73:41
- Label: Big Idea

Bob and Larry's Backyard Party is an album released by Big Idea on October 8, 2002.

==== Track listing ====
1. Take Me Out to the Ballgame (Backyard)
2. B-I-N-G-O (BONGO)
3. Head, Shoulders, Knees, and Toes... Do Your Ears Hang Low?
4. I Can Be Your Friend (from Are you my Neighbor)
5. If You're Happy and You Know It
6. How Many Monkeys?
7. His Banner Over Me Is Love
8. Come Over to My House and Play
9. You Are My Sunshine
10. The Green Grass Grows All Around
11. This Old Man
12. The Hokey Pokey
13. Polly Wolly Doodle
14. A Friend is a Friend
15. Shout! (originally by the Isley Brothers)
16. Split track (voices and music split)

=== O Veggie, Where Art Thou? (2003) ===
O Veggie, Where Art Thou?

Soundtrack album by VeggieTales
- Released: April 1, 2003
- Recorded: 2002–2003
- Genre: Children's music
- Length: 73:05
- Label: Big Idea

O Veggie, Where Art Thou? is an album released by Big Idea on April 1, 2003.

==== Track listing ====
1. Grandpa Bob's Old Time Radio Show
2. Old Time Religion
3. In the Highways
4. Amazing Grace
5. Do Lord/I'll Fly Away
6. Swing Low, Sweet Chariot
7. Standing in the Need of Prayer
8. Ezekiel Saw the Wheel
9. Just a Closer Walk with Thee
10. Have a Little Talk with Jesus
11. One Lord
12. River Medley
13. When the Saints Go Marching In
14. Good Shepherd (Psalm 23)
15. Sweet, Sweet Spirit
16. Grandpa Bob's Old Time Radio Show (Reprise)
17. Split-Tracks (tracks 17-32 repeat in karaoke version)

=== On the Road with Bob and Larry (2003) ===
On the Road with Bob and Larry

Soundtrack album by VeggieTales
- Released: April 1, 2003
- Recorded: 2002–2003
- Genre: Children's music
- Length: 72:22
- Label: Big Idea

On the Road with Bob and Larry is an album released by Big Idea on April 1, 2003.

==== Track listing ====
1. On the Road Again
2. Stop and Go with Mercy
3. The Wheels on the Bus
4. Bicycle Built for Two
5. The Surrey with the Fringe on Top
6. I've Been Working on the Railroad/Down by the Station
7. This Train
8. The Bear Went Over the Mountain
9. Ease on Down the Road
10. Driving Medley
11. I'm Gonna Sing, I'm Gonna Shout
12. Oh, You Can't Get to Heaven
13. Are We There Yet?
14. The Waiting Game
15. Happy Trails
16. Split-Tracks (tracks 16-30 repeat in karaoke version)

=== Veggie Rocks (2004) ===
Veggie Rocks!

Compilation album by Various Artists
- Released: March 9, 2004
- Genres: Christian rock, pop rock
- Length: 37:33
- Label: ForeFront

VeggieTales: Veggie Rocks! is an album released in 2004 of Silly Songs and various other songs from VeggieTales covered by popular Christian rock bands.

==== Track listing ====
1. "VeggieTales Theme Song" - Rebecca St. James (3:41)
2. "I Love My Lips" - Stevenson (4:11)
3. "Promised Land" - Sanctus Real (3:05)
4. "In The Belly of the Whale" - Newsboys (3:15)
5. "The Water Buffalo Song" - Superchick (2:58)
6. "I'm So Blue" - Paul Colman (3:16)
7. "Hairbrush Song" - Audio Adrenaline (5:13)
8. "The Pirates Who Don't Do Anything" - Relient K (2:14)
9. "I Can be Your Friend" - The O.C. Supertones (2:45)
10. "His Cheeseburger" - Tait (2:44)
11. "Stand" - Skillet (4:11)

=== VeggieTunes 4 (2004) ===
VeggieTunes 4

Soundtrack album by VeggieTales
- Released: October 5, 2004
- Recorded: 1993–1994 (track 1); 2003–2004 (tracks 2–19)
- Genre: Children's music
- Length: 31:43
- Label: Big Idea

VeggieTunes 4 is an album released on October 5, 2004.

==== Track listing ====
1. VeggieTales Theme Song
2. Happy Ki-Yi Birthday (from The Ballad of Little Joe)
3. Dream of a Dozen Cactus (from The Ballad of Little Joe)
4. Oh Little Joe I (McPotiphar's Song) (from The Ballad of Little Joe)
5. I'm Blue (from The Ballad of Little Joe)
6. Oh Little Joe II (Jail Cell) (from The Ballad of Little Joe)
7. Mayor's Dream (from The Ballad of Little Joe)
8. Oh Little Joe III (Instrumental) (from The Ballad of Little Joe)
9. Another Easter Day (An Easter Carol)
10. 113 Years Ago (An Easter Carol)
11. You Didn't Listen Ebenezer (An Easter Carol)
12. Boids (An Easter Carol)
13. The Factory (score) (from An Easter Carol)
14. Hope's Song (from An Easter Carol)
15. Another Easter Day (reprise) (from An Easter Carol)
16. Sport Utility Vehicle (from A Snoodle's Tale)
17. I Want to Dance (from A Snoodle's Tale)
18. I Want to Dance (disco version) (from A Snoodle's Tale)
19. What Have We Learned (Western version)

=== Bob and Larry's Campfire Songs (2004) ===
Bob and Larry's Campfire Songs

Soundtrack album by VeggieTales
- Released: August 24, 2004
- Recorded: 2003
- Genre: Children's music
- Length: 45:58
- Label: Big Idea

Bob and Larry's Campfire Songs is an album released in 2004.

==== Track listing ====
1. God Is Bigger
2. Stop, Drop and Roll
3. Buffalo Gals/Light of the Silvery Moon
4. For the Beauty of the Earth
5. King Jesus Is All
6. Kumbaya
7. Going on a Bear Hunt
8. Clementine
9. Oh Shenandoah
10. This Is My Father's World
11. On Top of Old Smokey
12. Pass It On
13. The Marshmallow Song
14. Home on the Range
15. Friends Are Friends Forever

=== Junior's Playtime Songs (2004) ===
Junior's Playtime Songs

Soundtrack album by VeggieTales
- Released: August 24, 2004
- Recorded: 2003
- Genre: Children's music
- Length: 35:53
- Label: Big Idea

Junior's Playtime Songs is an album released in 2004.

==== Track listing ====
1. Come Over to My House and Play
2. Playtime Song
3. Love My Lips (from Dave and the Giant Pickle)
4. Consider Yourself
5. Boom, Boom Ain't It Great to Be Crazy?
6. Rocka My Soul
7. Here We Go Loopty Loo
8. John Jimmy Jingleheimer Schmidt
9. Look Olaf!
10. I Got a Funny Feeling
11. My Aunt Came Back
12. Allelu, Allelu
13. What Do You Do (With a Tired Veggie?)
14. Friends Medley: Make New Friends/The More We Get Together
15. A Friend Is a Friend

=== Bob and Larry's Toddler Songs (2005) ===
Bob and Larry's Toddler Songs

Soundtrack album by VeggieTales
- Released: February 15, 2005
- Recorded: 2002–2004
- Genre: Children's music
- Length: 36:50
- Label: Big Idea

Bob and Larry's Toddler Songs is an album released in 2005.

==== Track listing ====
1. This Is the Day
2. The Wheels on the Bus
3. He's Got the Whole World in His Hands
4. The Hand Song
5. Love Your Neighbor
6. I've Been Working on the Railroad
7. If You're Happy and You Know It
8. Don't Ya Know
9. This Little Light of Mine
10. I've Got Peace Like a River
11. Thankfulness Song
12. The Dinner Time Song
13. Twinkle, Twinkle, Little Star
14. Think of Me
15. God Is So Good

=== More Bob and Larry's Sunday Morning Songs (2005) ===
More Bob and Larry's Sunday Morning Songs

Soundtrack album by VeggieTales
- Released: February 15, 2005
- Recorded: 2002–2004
- Genre: Children's music
- Length: 39:48
- Label: Big Idea

More Bob and Larry's Sunday Morning Songs is an album released in 2005.

==== Track listing ====
1. Open Up the Bible
2. Who Built the Ark?
3. I Am a Promise
4. Jacob's Ladder
5. I Got Shoes
6. Gospel Ship
7. God's Love
8. Father Abraham
9. Promised Land
10. Jonah Was a Prophet
11. Wise Man Built His House Upon the Rock
12. Fishers of Men/Peter, James & John in a Sailboat
13. It's a Miracle
14. Oh, How I Love Jesus
15. I Will Sing of the Mercies of the Lord/Leaning on the Everlasting Arms

=== The Incredible Singing Christmas Tree (2005) ===
The Incredible Singing Christmas Tree

Soundtrack album by VeggieTales
- Released: September 27, 2005
- Recorded: 2005
- Genres: Children's music, Christmas
- Length: 54:55
- Label: EMI
- Producers: Kurt Heinecke, Christopher Davis

==== Track listing ====
1. O Christmas Tree
2. Puppy Love
3. The Friendly Beasts
4. Jingle Ka-Ching
5. Battling Kings
6. Silent Night
7. Christmas Sizzle Boy
8. Candy Cane Blues
9. Was He a Boy Like Me?
10. What My Father Did on Christmas Eve
11. Here We Come a Caroling/Ding Dong Merrily on High
12. What Child is This?/The First Noel
13. Hark! The Herald Angels Sing/Angels We Have Heard on High
14. Joy to the World
15. For Unto Us A Child is Born
16. It's About Love

=== A Very Veggie Easter (2006) ===
A Very Veggie Easter

Soundtrack album by VeggieTales
- Released: March 14, 2006
- Recorded: April 19, 2005
- Genre: Children's music
- Length: 44:39
- Label: EMI
- Producers: Kurt Heinecke, Christopher Davis

A Very Veggie Easter is a 2006 album released by EMI and Big Idea] as a tie-in with the release of the VeggieTales episode "An Easter Carol".

==== Track listing ====
1. "Hosanna Lord Hosanna"
2. "All Around the World"
3. "Christ The Lord Is Risen Today"
4. "The Easter Bunny Hop"
5. "The Easter Song"
6. "How Now Easter Cow"
7. "Count Your Eggs"
8. "An Empty Egg"
9. "Hope's Song (re-recording from An Easter Carol)"
10. "First Things First"
11. "Christ The Lord Is Risen Today"
12. "I Know That My Redeemer Liveth"

All Songs By Mike Nawrocki & Kurt Heinecke (c) 2005–2006 Bob & Larry Publishing

=== Christian Hit Music (2007) ===
Christian Hit Music

Soundtrack album by VeggieTales
- Released: October 9, 2007
- Recorded: October 2006
- Genre: Children's music
- Length: 0:56:29
- Label: EMI

Christian Hit Music features VeggieTales characters singing hits from current Christian music artists.

==== Track listing ====
1. Big House - (originally by Audio Adrenaline)
2. In the Light - (originally by dcTalk)
3. Flood - (originally by Jars of Clay)
4. I Can Only Imagine - (originally by MercyMe)
5. Shine (originally by Newsboys)
6. Dive - (originally by Steven Curtis Chapman)
7. Meant To Live - (originally by Switchfoot)
8. Sadie Hawkins Dance - (originally by Relient K)
9. Baby, Baby - (originally by Amy Grant)
10. I'll Take You There - (originally by The Staple Singers)
11. Blue Skies - (originally by Point of Grace)
12. Made to Love - (originally by tobyMac)
13. Smellin' Coffee - (originally by Chris Rice)
14. Trumpet of Jesus - (originally by The Imperials)
15. Place in this World - (originally by Michael W. Smith)

All Songs by Mike Nawrocki (c) 2007 Bob & Larry Publishing

==== Reviews ====
- Jesus Freak Hideout

=== VeggieTales Greatest Hits (2008) ===
VeggieTales Greatest Hits

Soundtrack album by VeggieTales
- Released: March 11, 2008
- Recorded: 1993–2006
- Genre: Children's music
- Length: 39:22
- Label: Big Idea

VeggieTales Greatest Hits is an album released in 2008.

==== Track listing ====
1. VeggieTales Theme Song
2. God is Bigger (Than the Boogie Man)
3. The Water Buffalo Song
4. The Hairbrush Song
5. I Can Be Your Friend
6. Stand
7. The New and Improved Bunny Song
8. Big Things Too
9. The Pirates Who Don't Do Anything
10. The Song of the Cebú
11. His Cheeseburger (Love Songs with Mr. Lunt)
12. Thankfulness Song Medley
13. My Day
14. Bellybutton
15. What We Have Learned (ukulele)
16. Foreign Exchange Veggies

=== 25 Favorite Very Veggie Tunes (2009) ===
25 Favorite Very Veggie Tunes

Soundtrack album by VeggieTales
- Released: March 17, 2009
- Recorded: 1993–1997
- Genre: Children's music
- Length: 39:22
- Label: Big Idea

==== Track listing ====
1. VeggieTales Theme Song
2. God is Bigger (Than the Boogie Man) (from Where's God When I’m S-Scared?)
3. The Water Buffalo Song (from Where's God When I’m S-Scared?)
4. King Darius Suite (from Where's God When I’m S-Scared?)
5. Oh, No! What We Gonna Do? (from Where's God When I’m S-Scared?)
6. We've Got Some News (from Where's God When I’m S-Scared?)
7. Fear Not, Daniel (from Where's God When I’m S-Scared?)
8. We Are The Grapes of Wrath (from God Wants Me to Forgive Them!?!)
9. The Forgiveness Song (from God Wants Me to Forgive Them!?!)
10. Busy, Busy (from Are You My Neighbor?)
11. Love Your Neighbor (from Are You My Neighbor?)
12. The Hairbrush Song (from Are You My Neighbor?)
13. I Can Be Your Friend (from Are You My Neighbor?)
14. Dance of the Cucumber (from Rack, Shack, & Benny)
15. Good Morning George (The Chocolate Factory) (from Rack, Shack, & Benny)
16. Think Of Me (from Rack, Shack, & Benny)
17. The Bunny Song (New & Improved)
18. Stand Up! (from Rack, Shack, & Benny)
19. Love My Lips (from Dave & the Giant Pickle)
20. Big Things Too (from Dave and the Giant Pickle)
21. The Pirates Who Don't Do Anything (from Very Silly Songs!/A Very Silly Sing-Along!)
22. It's Laura's Fault (from Larry-Boy! and the Fib From Outer Space!)
23. The Promised Land (from Josh and the Big Wall!)
24. Keep Walking (from Josh and the Big Wall!)
25. The Song of the Cebú (from Josh and the Big Wall!)
