= Lunz =

Lunz may refer to:

- Christopher Lunz
- Gerald Lunz, television producer and spouse of Rick Mercer
- Jerry Lunz (1903–?), American football player
- Lunz Formation, a geologic formation in Austria
- Lunz am See, Lower Austria, Austria

== See also ==
- Luntz, a surname
