= Lunt (surname) =

Lunt is a surname. Notable people with the surname include:

- Alfred Lunt (1892–1977), American stage director and actor
- Alphonso M. Lunt (1837–1917), American soldier
- Dolly Lunt Burge, of the historic Burge Plantation, Georgia, United States
- Evered Lunt (1900–1982), English Anglican bishop
- Geoffrey Lunt (1885–1948), English Anglican bishop
- George Lunt (1803–1885), American editor, lawyer, author, and politician
- Horace Lunt (1918–2010), American linguist
- James Lunt (1917–2001), British Army officer and military historian
- Kenny Lunt (born 1979), English retired professional footballer
- Laurel Lunt Prussing (born 1941), American politician
- Michael Lunt (1935–2007), English amateur golfer
- Shaun Lunt (born 1987), English professional rugby league footballer
- Tom Lunt, American music producer
- Wes Lunt (born 1993), American football quarterback
- Wilbur Fisk Lunt (1848–1908), American attorney
- William Edward Lunt (1882–1956), American medievalist

== See also ==
- Lunts
