= Eric Branscum =

American screenwriter

- Born: Eric Branscum; July 8, 1984 (age 41); Dayton, Ohio, United States
- Occupation: Screenwriter
- Years active: 2013-present
- Notable work: VeggieTales in the House, VeggieTales in the City, The American Bystander

Eric Branscum (born July 8, 1984) is an American screenwriter. He is best known for his work on VeggieTales in the House.

== Early life ==
Branscum was born in Dayton, Ohio. He studied Film at the University of Toledo.

== Career ==
Branscum has written 66 episodes of VeggieTales in the House and was a story editor for both seasons of VeggieTales in the City for DreamWorks Animation. He is a member of The Animation Guild, I.A.T.S.E. Local 839.

Branscum is featured in issue #2 of print humor magazine The American Bystander.

He worked as a scripted creator for The Daily Wire from 2023 to 2025.
