= Luntz =

Luntz is a German or Yiddish surname, a variant of Lunz. Notable people with the surname include:

- Édouard Luntz (1931–2009), French film director
- Frank Luntz (born 1962), American political consultant and pollster
- Harold Luntz (1937–2025), Australian law professor

== See also ==
- Lunz (disambiguation)
- Lunts
