= VeggieTales in the City =

2017 American television series

- Series poster
- Genre: Christianity
- Created by: Doug TenNapel
- Based on: Characters created by Phil Vischer and Mike Nawrocki
- Developed by: Doug TenNapel
- Written by: Ethan Nicolle; Eric Branscum
- Directed by: Tim Hodge; Bill Breneisen; Emily Jourdan
- Voices of: Phil Vischer; Mike Nawrocki; Rob Paulsen; Tress MacNeille
- Opening theme: "VeggieTales in the City Theme Song"
- Ending theme: "VeggieTales in the City Theme Song" (instrumental)
- Composers: Terry Scott Taylor; Robert D. Watson; Michael "Smidi" Smith; Scott Krippayne
- Country of origin: United States
- Original language: English
- No. of seasons: 2
- No. of episodes: 26 (52 segments)

Production
- Executive producer: Doug TenNapel
- Running time: 22 minutes (11 minutes per segment)
- Production companies: Big Idea Entertainment; DreamWorks Animation Television (uncredited)

Original release
- Network: Netflix
- Release: February 24 – September 15, 2017

Related
- VeggieTales in the House; The VeggieTales Show

VeggieTales in the City is an American animated comedy Christian television series produced by Big Idea Entertainment. The series is a sequel/continuation to VeggieTales in the House and it premiered on Netflix on February 24, 2017 with the release of 13 episodes. A second season was released on September 15, 2017. The series was removed from Netflix on September 15, 2023.

== Cast ==
=== Main ===
- Bob the Tomato (voiced by Phil Vischer) – One of the main characters of VeggieTales, he is best friends and roommates with Larry the Cucumber. He works part-time at Pa Grape's store doing various jobs and tasks. He enjoys doing things like reading, studying the weather with his weather machine, and helping out his friends in the city.
- Larry the Cucumber (voiced by Mike Nawrocki) – Best friends and roommates with Bob the Tomato, Larry is scatterbrained and has an energetic, childlike personality. He enjoys doing very silly things, like singing silly songs, eating large amounts of sardines, and riding his bicycle on the ceiling. He works driving the town's ice-cream cart and does odd jobs at Pa Grape's store. He secretly protects the city from crime as the superhero LarryBoy, making use of a LarryMobile and a secret lair underneath the apartment he shares with Bob.
- Laura Carrot (voiced by Tress MacNeille) – A young carrot girl who is friends with Bob and Larry and Junior Asparagus, her best friend. She loves playing with her friends, including baseball and jump rope. She eventually gained a superheroine alter-ego dubbed "Night Pony", where she helps fight crime with LarryBoy and the other superheroes of the house.
- Junior Asparagus (voiced by Tress MacNeille) – Best friends with Laura, Junior is a typical child and looks up to Larry. Like Larry, he also has a superhero alter-ego, "Junior Jetpack", using a jetpack given to him by Ichabeezer. Junior is often a superhero duo with LarryBoy.
- Archibald Asparagus (voiced by Phil Vischer) – The Mayor of the town with an upper-crust British accent. He enjoys being the mayor and leader of the city, but more often than not, he can be overwhelmed by the amount of work he does. He often acts as a judge/impartial third party whenever something is wrong.

=== Recurring ===
- Ichabeezer (voiced by Rob Paulsen) – Ichabeezer is a grumpy, gruff and elderly zucchini. He doesn't like or get along very well with the other veggies, especially when they get on his lawn. The only thing Ichabeezer truly likes is his beloved pet olive dog, Rooney. For the Netflix era, he has essentially assumed Mr. Nezzer's role as an outsider/villain foil for Bob and Larry. His home is a large mansion built out of the side of a couch.
- Petunia Rhubarb (voiced by Tress MacNeille) – Good friends with Bob, Larry, and Tina Celerina. She often enjoys hanging out with them and often offers them advice whenever they get into a fight or face personal problems. She worked part-time at Pa Grape's store, but followed her love of plants and has opened a flower shop.
- Madame Blueberry (voiced by Tress MacNeille) – A female blueberry with a slight British accent. She lives in a blue, teapot-shaped house, where she spends most of her time drinking tea and enjoying the "fancier" things in life. She has been known to win various contests and events around town such as karaoke and pie baking. She has an especially lovely singing-voice and has a specialty for singing "the blues."
- Pa Grape (voiced by Phil Vischer) – A wise old grape who runs a convenience store called Pa's Corner Store. He often provides wise and insightful advice to his friends and customers. He now has eyes.
- Jimmy and Jerry Gourd (voiced by Phil Vischer and Mike Nawrocki) - Brothers who live together in an apartment not far from Bob and Larry's house. They don't do much, but they love to eat and spend time with their pet dust bunny Danny, and their other pet guppy named Happy Sunshine Bubbles. Jimmy also gained a superhero alter-ego by the name of JimmyBoy, where LarryBoy has taken Jimmy under his wing and trained him to be a superhero.
- Jean-Claude and Phillipe Pea (voiced by Mike Nawrocki and Phil Vischer) – The brothers, Jean-Claude and Phillipe, are peas with French accents. The brothers appear to be school aged and presumably live together while their father lives in France.
- Mr. Lunt (voiced by Phil Vischer) – A Hispanic gourd who works around the city and sells various items, often joking that his job changes every episode. He eventually set up his own place of business, where he can be seen doing his various odd jobs. Carrying on from the original videos, his lack of eyes is a running gag throughout the show.
- Bacon Bill (voiced by Rob Paulsen) – An eccentric genius who is the son of one of Pa Grape's friends. He looks up to Larry as an older brother figure. He is very wacky, and can often be seen doing various silly things, mostly on Ichabeezer's lawn.
- Tina Celerina (voiced by Tress MacNeille) – Petunia's best friend and employee of her flower shop. She is very scatterbrained and quirky, which can get her into trouble. Despite this, she has a very positive attitude and an outgoing personality.
- Motato (voiced by Rob Paulsen) – An evil Sweet Potato who is LarryBoy's chief nemesis. He is quite insane and enjoys wreaking havoc and chaos on the Veggie citizens of the house. Along with his Radish minions, he carries out various nefarious plots to destroy the city. His evil lair is located in his bathroom. In "Attack of the Marshmallow Laser", he has reformed to a good guy and became part of the League of Veggies.
- Aprilcot (voiced by Tress MacNeille) - An apricot supervillain; Motato's former partner-in-crime.

== Episodes ==
=== Season 1 (2017) ===
Episode No.	Segment No.	Title	Directed by	Written by	Release date
1a	1	"Burgers for Sale"	Tim Hodge	Ethan Nicolle	February 24, 2017
Ichabeezer gets a tough lesson in customer relations at his new burger joint.
1b	2	"Night Phony"	Tim Hodge	Ethan Nicolle	February 24, 2017
Envious of Junior's jetpack, Laura tries out Motato's Helmet of Doom.
2a	3	"Space Pirates!"	Tim Hodge	Ethan Nicolle	February 24, 2017
Larry wants to be the first veggie on the moon, but pirate Motato has other ideas.
2b	4	"Rooney on the Run"	Tim Hodge	Ethan Nicolle	February 24, 2017
Laura's puppy-training plan goes awry after she lets Rooney escape.
3a	5	"Junior Saves the West"	Tim Hodge	Eric Branscum	February 24, 2017
Set in the Wild West, Junior Asparagus challenges Jakeasaurus to an "annoying showdown".
3b	6	"The Treasure Hunt"	Bill Breneisen	Ethan Nicolle	February 24, 2017
Bob and Larry follow a map that leads them all around the house and back yard to buried treasure. But they have different ideas on what to do with the treasure.
4a	7	"Race Ya!"	Emily Jourdan	Eric Branscum	February 24, 2017
Laura and Junior get consumed competing on a family winter vacation.
4b	8	"Larry the Substitute"	Tim Hodge	Steven Marten	February 24, 2017
Larry the substitute teacher teaches Bob's music class but can't concentrate.
5a	9	"Pizza Eclipse"	Bill Breneisen	Ethan Nicolle	February 24, 2017
Bob forgives Larry when he misses the rare solar eclipse, but Larry won't forgive Bob when his pizza is destroyed.
5b	10	"The Robot"	Emily Jourdan	Eric Branscum	February 24, 2017
Bob and Larry pretend to be robots, fooling everyone in the city, but end up attracting the attention of the evil Motato.
6a	11	"Delivery Boys"	Tim Hodge	Ethan Nicolle	February 24, 2017
Larry and Bacon Bill compete as delivery boys.
6b	12	"Dueling Mascots"	Bill Breneisen	Eric Branscum	February 24, 2017
Pa Grape hires Bob and Larry as mascots, so Ichaburger hires Bacon Bill and Tina Celerina to compete.
7a	13	"Bob's Collection"	Emily Jourdan	Ethan Nicolle	February 24, 2017
Bob gets the chance of a lifetime to be a curator of a sock museum.
7b	14	"The Cookie Caper"	Tim Hodge	Eric Branscum	February 24, 2017
When Granny Asparagus gives Bob and Larry fresh cookies, Bob is reluctant to share.
8a	15	"The Rocket Boot"	Bill Breneisen	Eric Branscum	February 24, 2017
When Ichabeezer flaunts his new fancy rocket boot, Larry will do anything to get one too.
8b	16	"The Many Versions of Larry"	Emily Jourdan	Ethan Nicolle	February 24, 2017
Larry thinks he's bland, so he tries acting like other people.
9a	17	"Aprilcot"	Tim Hodge	Ethan Nicolle	February 24, 2017
A new villain named Aprilcot tries to split up LarryBoy & the League of Veggies.
9b	18	"X Marks the Spot"	Bill Breneisen	Bill Breneisen	February 24, 2017
Bob, Larry, Bacon Bill and Tina join Ichabeezer for a game of pirates.
10a	19	"The Priceless Sock"	Emily Jourdan	Ethan Nicolle	February 24, 2017
Larry mistakenly destroys Bob's antique sock and explores all over to try and replace it.
10b	20	"Jimmy Makes a Comic Book"	Tim Hodge	Eric Branscum	February 24, 2017
Jimmy takes credit for the LarryBoy comic book that Bob made.
11a	21	"The Book Club"	Bill Breneisen	Ethan Nicolle	February 24, 2017
Bob excludes Larry when he wants to join an exclusive book club.
11b	22	"The Lost Dust Bunny"	Emily Jourdan	Doug TenNapel	February 24, 2017
Mayor Archibald asks Bob and Larry to watch over a herd of dust bunnies.
12a	23	"The Water Slide"	Tim Hodge	Ethan Nicolle	February 24, 2017
Bob must help Larry be brave when a new intimidating water slide opens in town.
12b	24	"Story Time"	Bill Breneisen	Eric Branscum	February 24, 2017
Bob teaches his class about honesty using three different stories.
13a	25	"Prodigal Junior"	Emily Jourdan	Ethan Nicolle	February 24, 2017
Junior spends the money his mom gave him for milk on comic books instead.
13b	26	"Where's the Mayor"	Tim Hodge	Ethan Nicolle	February 24, 2017
Aprilcot uses a costume of Mayor Archibald in order to gain control of the Veggie House.

=== Season 2 (2017) ===
Episode No.	Segment No.	Title	Directed by	Written by	Release date
14a	27	"Stranded"	Bill Breneisen; Andy Casadonte	Bill Breneisen	September 15, 2017
When the Veggies get stranded, Bob emerges as a leader but gets too comfortable.
14b	28	"Junior Gets a Sister"	Emily Jourdan	Ethan Nicolle	September 15, 2017
When the Asparagus family gets a new baby sister, Junior is no longer the center of attention.
15a	29	"The Movie Star"	Tim Hodge	Eric Branscum	September 15, 2017
Madame Blueberry gets prideful when cast to star with Tom Celeriac.
15b	30	"New in Town"	Andy Casadonte	Eric Branscum	September 15, 2017
Larry makes a new friend, but Jimmy and Tina wanted nothing to do with him.
16a	31	"The Hottest Pepper in the West"	Emily Jourdan	Ethan Nicolle	September 15, 2017
Larry and Jimmy get carried away when trying to out-do each other in an eating contest.
16b	32	"Karate Pirate Space Posse"	Tim Hodge	Ethan Nicolle	September 15, 2017
After the Veggies clash during playtime, they realize compromise and playing together is much more fun.
17a	33	"Plane vs. Train"	Andy Casadonte	Mike Nawrocki	September 15, 2017
Ichabeezer brags about his train being the fastest so Bob and Larry challenge him to a race.
17b	34	"Larry's Baby Birdies"	Emily Jourdan	Ethan Nicolle	September 15, 2017
Larry decides to care for a nest of baby birdies he finds on the ground.
18a	35	"Two of a Kind"	Tim Hodge	Eric Branscum	September 15, 2017
Bob and Larry are the perfect complements to each other until Bob belittles Larry's role in the duo.
18b	36	"Moving to the City"	Andy Casadonte	Ethan Nicolle	September 15, 2017
Bob moves to the city to join Larry after he gets a job but realizes the city is not for him.
19a	37	"An Ichabeezer Christmas"	Emily Jourdan	Ethan Nicolle	September 15, 2017
Ichabeezer is visited by three spirits on Christmas Eve to remind him of what is really important in life.
19b	38	"A Christmas Play"	Tim Hodge	Eric Branscum	September 15, 2017
Bob wants to put on the biggest and flashiest Christmas play ever.
20a	39	"Ichaburgertopia"	Andy Casadonte	Ethan Nicolle	September 15, 2017
Ichabezzer asks Bob and Larry and their friends to build an Ichaburgertopia, but then they fail buildings due to their laziness. Later it rains and Ichaburgertopia falls down. Bob and Larry do manage to save Ichabezzer. After hard work on the building, Bob and Larry are offered free burgers.
20b	40	"The Truth Hurts"	Emily Jourdan	Eric Branscum	September 15, 2017
Larry trains people to make toy robots and learns the importance of being honest in a loving way.
21a	41	"Employee Fun Day"	Tim Hodge	Ethan Nicolle	September 15, 2017
Ichabeezer wants to give his employee a Fun Day, but takes them to do things only he finds fun.
21b	42	"Bringing Home the Bacon"	Andy Casadonte	Mike Nawrocki	September 15, 2017
Bacon Bill and his band practice for a big concert but keep the neighbors up.
22a	43	"Books of the Bible"	Emily Jourdan	Ethan Nicolle	September 15, 2017
Mayor Archibald teams Granny and Larry, Corn and Carrot Men, Bob and Jerry, Mr. Lunt and Laura, and Bill and Madame Blueberry in pairs to study the books of the Bible.
22b	44	"Monster in the Closet"	Tim Hodge	Eric Branscum	September 15, 2017
Bacon Bill believes a monster is in his closet and teams up with Larry to overcome his fear.
23a	45	"Arcade Showdown"	Andy Casadonte	Ethan Nicolle	September 15, 2017
Bob gets a high score in an old video game but must learn the importance of humility.
23b	46	"The Audition"	Emily Jourdan	Mike Nawrocki	September 15, 2017
When Tom Celeriac doesn't get the part in a town play, he takes matters into his own hands.
24a	47	"The Singing, Dancing Lobster"	Tim Hodge	Eric Branscum	September 15, 2017
Larry finds a lobster that sings and dances only when no one else is looking.
24b	48	"It's Skatin' Time"	Andy Casadonte	Bill Breneisen	September 15, 2017
Larry cheats to be the best skateboarder, but when cheating backfires he learns that practice is the only way to go.
25a	49	"The Last Issue"	Emily Jourdan	Ethan Nicolle	September 15, 2017
LarryBoy refuses to leave when waiting for a comic book, but must make a choice when Motato attacks.
25b	50	"Bob's Great Store"	Tim Hodge	Eric Branscum	September 15, 2017
Bob takes over Pa's store and learns that running a store isn't easy.
26a	51	"Attack of the Marshmallow Laser"	Andy Casadonte	Ethan Nicolle	September 15, 2017
Motato makes a laser that shoots marshmallows.
26b	52	"Bye Bye Bacon Bill"	Emily Jourdan	Eric Branscum	September 15, 2017
Bacon Bill is supposed to move away to inherit his grandfather's factory, but Larry has trouble accepting that. While Bob tries to help Larry say goodbye to his friend, the others decide to make it a day for Bill to remember.

== Reception ==
Common Sense Media rated the series 4 out of 5 stars.
