= VeggieTales in the House =

American animated children's television series

- Genre: Christianity
- Created by: Doug TenNapel
- Based on: Characters created by Phil Vischer and Mike Nawrocki
- Developed by: Doug TenNapel
- Written by: Ethan Nicolle; Eric Branscum; Michael J. Nelson; Wes Halula; Kristine Lacey; Doug TenNapel
- Directed by: Tim Hodge; Craig George; Bill Breneisen
- Voices of: Phil Vischer; Mike Nawrocki; Tress MacNeille; Rob Paulsen; Kel Mitchell; China Anne McClain; Maurice LaMarche; Tony Hale; Jon Heder
- Opening theme: "VeggieTales in the House Theme Song"
- Ending theme: "VeggieTales in the House Theme Song"(instrumental)
- Composers: Terry Scott Taylor; Robert D. Watson; Michael "Smidi" Smith; Scott Krippayne
- Country of origin: United States
- Original language: English
- No. of seasons: 4
- No. of episodes: 52 (104 segments) (list of episodes)

Production
- Executive producer: Doug TenNapel
- Running time: 22 minutes (11 minutes per segment)
- Production companies: Big Idea Entertainment; DreamWorks Animation Television

Original release
- Network: Netflix
- Release: November 26, 2014 – September 23, 2016

Related
- VeggieTales; VeggieTales in the City

VeggieTales in the House is an American animated comedy television series developed by Doug TenNapel (of Earthworm Jim and Catscratch fame) and produced by Big Idea Entertainment (owned by DreamWorks Classics), and animated by Bardel Entertainment. It picks up after the VeggieTales original home video series and stars many of the same cast members as in the first series. Additional characters are voiced by Tress MacNeille, Rob Paulsen, Kel Mitchell, China Anne McClain, Maurice LaMarche, Tony Hale, and Jon Heder.

== Characters ==
=== Main ===
- Bob the Tomato (voiced by Phil Vischer) – One of the main characters of VeggieTales, he is best friends and roommates with Larry the Cucumber and acts as the straight man to Larry. He works part-time at Pa Grape's store doing various jobs and tasks.
- Larry the Cucumber (voiced by Mike Nawrocki) – Best friends and roommates with Bob the Tomato, Larry is scatterbrained and has a silly and enthusiastic personality. He works driving the town's ice-cream cart and does odd jobs at Pa Grape's store. He secretly protects the city from crime as the superhero LarryBoy.
- Petunia Rhubarb (voiced by Tress MacNeille) – Good friends with Bob, Larry, and Tina Celerina. She often enjoys hanging out with them and often offers them advice whenever they get into a fight or face personal problems. After working at Pa Grape's store, she opened her own flower shop.
- Laura Carrot (voiced by Tress MacNeille) – A young carrot girl who is friends with Bob and Larry and Junior Asparagus, her best friend. She eventually gained a superheroine alter-ego dubbed "Night Pony" and helps fight crime with LarryBoy and other superheroes.
- Junior Asparagus (voiced by Tress MacNeille) – Best friends with Laura, Junior is a typical child and looks up to Larry. Like Larry, he also has a superhero alter-ego, "Junior Jetpack", using a jetpack given to him by Ichabeezer.
- Madame Blueberry (voiced by Tress MacNeille) – A female blueberry with a British accent. She lives in a blue, teapot-shaped house, where she spends most of her time drinking tea and enjoying the "fancier" things in life.
- Archibald Asparagus (voiced by Phil Vischer) – The Mayor of the town with an upper-crust British accent. He enjoys being the mayor and leader of the town, but more often than not, he can be overwhelmed by the amount of work he does. He often acts as a judge/impartial third party when something goes wrong.

=== Recurring ===
- Ichabeezer (voiced by Rob Paulsen) – Ichabeezer is a grumpy, gruff and elderly zucchini who doesn't get along with the other veggies. For the Netflix era, he has essentially assumed Mr. Nezzer's role as an outsider/villainous foil for Bob and Larry.
- Jimmy and Jerry Gourd (voiced by Phil Vischer and Mike Nawrocki) - Brothers who live together in an apartment not far from Bob and Larry's house. They don't do much, but they love to eat. Jimmy also gained a superhero alter-ego by the name of JimmyBoy and is being trained under the wing of LarryBoy.
- Pa Grape (voiced by Phil Vischer) – A wise old grape who runs a convenience store called Pa's Corner Store. He often provides wise and insightful advice to his friends and customers.
- Madame Blueberry (voiced by Tress MacNeille) – A female blueberry with a British accent. She lives in a blue, teapot-shaped house, where she spends most of her time drinking tea and enjoying the "fancier" things in life.
- Archibald Asparagus (voiced by Phil Vischer) – The Mayor of the town with an upper-crust British accent. He enjoys being the mayor and leader of the town, but more often than not, he can be overwhelmed by the amount of work he does. He often acts as a judge/impartial third party when something goes wrong.
- Jean-Claude and Phillipe Pea (voiced by Mike Nawrocki and Phil Vischer) – The brothers are peas with French accents.
- Mr. Lunt (voiced by Phil Vischer) – A gourd who works around town and sells various items, often joking that his job changes every episode. He eventually sets up his own place of business, where he can be seen doing various odd jobs. Carrying on from the original videos, his lack of eyes is a running gag throughout the show.
- Bacon Bill (voiced by Rob Paulsen) – An eccentric genius who is the son of one of Pa Grape's friends. He looks up to Larry as an older brother figure.
- Lil’ Pea (voiced by Kel Mitchell) - A pea who's the son of Dad Pea.
- Tina Celerina (voiced by Tress MacNeille) – Petunia's best friend and employee of her flower shop.
- Motato (voiced by Rob Paulsen) – An evil, deformed Sweet Potato who is LarryBoy's chief nemesis. Along with his Radish minions, he carries out various nefarious plots to destroy the town. He is the series' main antagonist.
- Radishes (voiced by Phil Vischer and Mike Nawrocki) - Evil minions of Motato.
- Callie Flower (voiced by Tress MacNeille) - A cauliflower who is a classmate of Junior Asparagus.
- Mike Asparagus (voiced by Rob Paulsen) - Junior Asparagus' astronaut dad.
- Lisa Asparagus (voiced by Tress MacNeille) - Junior Asparagus' mom.
- Tom Celeriac (voiced by Rob Paulsen) - A mustachioed celery root movie star.

== Episodes ==
Season	Segments	Episodes		Originally released
1	10	15	5	November 26, 2014
1	10	15	5	January 30, 2015
1	10	15	5	April 17, 2015
2	22	11		September 25, 2015
3	26	13		March 25, 2016
4	26	13		September 23, 2016

== Production ==
Poster for VeggieTales in the House featuring (from left to right:) Laura, Larry, Bob, and Petunia

The series was executive produced by TenNapel, creator of Earthworm Jim, Project G.e.e.K.e.R. and Catscratch. The series was released to Netflix on November 26, 2014. The show lasted for three years before ending in 2016. A follow-up series, titled VeggieTales in the City, was released on February 24, 2017, but ended by September 2017.

The two creators of the traditional VeggieTales series from 1993 reprise their voices of the characters: Phil Vischer reprises the voices of Bob the Tomato, Archibald Asparagus, Jimmy Gourd, Phillipe Pea, Mr. Lunt, and Pa Grape and Mike Nawrocki reprises the voices of Larry the Cucumber, Jerry Gourd, and Jean-Claude Pea. Other characters on the show (including the rest of the original characters brought over from the original VeggieTales series) are voiced by Tress MacNeille as Petunia Rhubarb, Madame Blueberry, Laura Carrot, and Junior Asparagus, Rob Paulsen, who provides the voice of Ichabeezer and two new characters named Bacon Bill and Motato, Maurice LaMarche, and Kel Mitchell, among others. Vischer revealed that he nearly passed on the show due to the fact that they would only pay him the "S.A.G. minimum" for voicing Bob. Upon hearing that he was leaving, DreamWorks insisted that he get a higher salary so that they can keep him on.

The series was removed from Netflix on September 23, 2022, six years after the release of the fourth and final season. Despite this, VeggieTales in the City was available on the service until September 2023.

== Reception ==
Despite receiving positive reviews from critics, the series was criticized by some for the redesigns of the characters and superficial Christian messages. Viewership of both the series and its follow-up on Netflix were significantly lower than the viewership of the original series, and it was eventually cancelled in March 2018, before a revival of the series titled The VeggieTales Show was announced.

== Home media ==
Big Idea Entertainment have released only two DVD volumes of VeggieTales in the House. Each release contained seven episodes from the first season, and one episode from the second season.

Region 1
Title	Season(s)	Episode count	Release date
Puppies and Guppies	1, 2	8	March 25, 2016
Contained "Puppies and Guppies" (1a), "Laura at Bat" (5a), "Larry's Cardboard Thumb (6b)", "Junior Gets a Pet" (11b), "Cool as a Cucumber (12a)", "Popcorntastrophe!" (13a), "Junior Jetpack" (13b) and "The Guppy Whisperer" (16b).
Captain LarryBeard and the Search for the Pirate Ship	1, 2	8	October 18, 2016
Contained "Sorry, We're Closed Today" (1b), "Bob and the Awesome Frosting Mustache" (2a), "Trading Places" (3b), "The Gong Heard 'Round the House" (7a), "The Bucket List" (8a), "The Rich Young Comic Ruler" (12b), "Captain LarryBeard" (15b) and "DUO Day" (20b).
