= Mike Nawrocki =

American animator and filmmaker (born 1966)

- Born: Michael Louis Nawrocki; July 8, 1966 (age 60); Dayton, Ohio, U.S.
- Other name: Michael Nawrocki
- Education: St. Paul Bible College; University of Illinois Chicago
- Occupations: Executive Vice President and co-founder of Big Idea Entertainment; Visiting Professor at Lipscomb University
- Years active: 1989–present
- Notable work: VeggieTales; 3-2-1 Penguins!; The Dead Sea Squirrels
- Spouse: Lisa Klepp (m. 1995)
- Children: 2
- Website: https://www.lipscomb.edu/directory/nawrocki-mike https://www.linkedin.com/in/mike-nawrocki-450b465

Michael Louis Nawrocki (born July 8, 1966) is an American animator, filmmaker, and voice actor best known as the co-creator of the video series, VeggieTales, where he voiced Larry the Cucumber. He voiced many other main characters on the show, including Jerry Gourd, Jean-Claude Pea, and various other characters. He is the co-founder of Big Idea Entertainment alongside Phil Vischer, and has directed several of their productions, including the Silly Songs with Larry segments from VeggieTales.

== Life and career ==
Nawrocki originally wanted a career in the medical field, and studied at St. Paul Bible College (now Crown College) where he met Phil Vischer while serving on a puppet ministry.

In 1993, Nawrocki left Film & Tape Works, a company that had purchased GRAFx Studios, and his future in medicine to join Vischer and founded Big Idea Productions. After Big Idea's liquidation in 2003, Nawrocki reactivated the company in 2004.

In 2014, DreamWorks Classics, the parent company of Big Idea, signed an exclusive deal with Netflix to produce and distribute VeggieTales in the House. Nawrocki was signed on to continue voicing most of his characters.

In 2019, Nawrocki began releasing the Christian children's chapter book series The Dead Sea Squirrels, in which a boy named Michael discovers the petrified remains of Merle and Pearl, a squirrel couple who lived near the Dead Sea during Jesus' time. Michael then smuggles them to America, where they are revived. It was conceptualized in 2016 originally as an animated series. In 2025, an animated series adaptation of the same name was released on the Christian children's streaming service Minno.

=== Revival of VeggieTales ===
In March 2019, Nawrocki's partner Phil Vischer announced on his Twitter that he had re-teamed with Nawrocki at TBN to revive the VeggieTales series. Just like previously, Vischer and Nawrocki would return to voice their characters and also work as writers for the new show.

== Awards ==
Year	Award	Nominated work	Result
1997	Animated Short Film or Video World's Children's Prize Foundation's Children's Jury Award	Very Silly Songs	Won
1997	Children's Music Album of the Year GMA Dove Award	A Very Veggie Christmas	Won
1998	Long Form Music Video of the Year GMA Dove Award	A Very Silly Sing Along	Won
2000	Children's Music Album of the Year GMA Dove Award	Larry-Boy: The Soundtrack	Won
2001	Children's Music Album of the Year GMA Dove Award	A Queen, A King, and A Very Blue Berry - VeggieTunes;	Won
2003	Children's Music Album of the Year GMA Dove Award	Jonah, A Veggie Tales Movie Original Soundtrack	Won
2004	Long Form Music Video of the Year GMA Dove Award	Belly Button	Nominated
2007	Children's Music Album of the Year GMA Dove Award	VeggieTales Worship Songs	Won
2014	Children's Album of the Year GMA Dove Award	25 Favorite Bible Songs - Veggie Tales	Won

== Published works ==
- Bob Lends a Helping . . . Hand? (2003) ISBN 0-310-70538-X (co-author with Cindy Kenney)
- Peas and Thank You! (2003) ISBN 0-310-70540-1 (writing as the voice of Larry the Cucumber)
- The Pirates Who Don't Do Anything and Me! (2004) (co-author with Karen Poth)
- The Dead Sea Squirrels (2019–present) (author)

== Filmography ==
Year	Title	Voice role	Crew role, notes
1993–2015	VeggieTales series	Larry the Cucumber, Jerry Gourd, Jean-Claude Pea, QWERTY, Scallion 2, Oscar, The Peach, Additional Voices	Direct-to-video series Co-creator, director, producer, writer, composer
2000–2003, 2007–2008	3-2-1 Penguins!	Vacuum	TV series Developer, writer, composer
2002	Jonah: A VeggieTales Movie	Larry the Cucumber, Dad Asparagus, Jean-Claude Pea, Jerry Gourd, Self-Help Tape Voice, Cockney Pea 1, Whooping BBQ Pea	Feature film Director, writer, composer
2002–2003	Larryboy: The Cartoon Adventures	Larry-Boy/Larry	TV series
2008	The Pirates Who Don't Do Anything: A VeggieTales Movie	Elliot (Larry the Cucumber), Theater Foe (Jerry Gourd), Pirate Jean-Claude Pea, Pirate with Dummy, Pirate Spy Sidekick, Rock Monster Father	Feature film Director, producer
2014–2016	VeggieTales in the House	Larry the Cucumber, Jerry Gourd, Jean-Claude Pea, Officer Wedge, Additional Voices	Netflix TV series
2017	VeggieTales in the City	Larry the Cucumber, Jerry Gourd, Jean-Claude Pea, Officer Wedge, Additional Voices	Netflix TV series
2019–2022	The VeggieTales Show	Larry the Cucumber, Jerry Gourd, Jean-Claude Pea, Lil' Pea, Qwerty, Mother Nezzer, Scallion 2, Scallion 3, Additional Voices	Writer, Composer
2020–2021	Esme & Roy		Writer (2 episodes)
2025	The Dead Sea Squirrels	Merle, Bob Squirrel	Creator, Director, Producer, Writer, Composer
TBA	The Phil & Mike Show	Mike	
