= Lunts =

Lunts is a Yiddish surname, a variant of Luntz. Notable people with the surname include:

- Boris Lunts (1908–1997), World War II pilot, Jewish Hero of the Soviet Union
- Daniil Lunts (1912–1977), KGB agent who ran the Serbski Institute for Forensic Psychiatry in Moscow
- Lev Lunts (1901–1924), Russian playwright, prose writer and critic
