= Larryboy: The Cartoon Adventures =

Animated series

- Genre: Crime; Action-Adventure; Superhero; Children; Christian; Religious; Comic science fiction Comedy; Fantasy; Animation
- Based on: Characters by Phil Vischer; Mike Nawrocki
- Developed by: Tom Bancroft
- Directed by: Larry Whitaker
- Starring: Mike Nawrocki; Phil Vischer; Lisa Vischer; Larry Whitaker; Shari Belgeau
- Narrated by: Lee Marshall
- Opening theme: "He is That Hero"
- Ending theme: "He is That Hero" (instrumental)
- Composers: Jesse Tewson; Christopher Davis
- Country of origin: United States
- Original language: English
- No. of episodes: 4 (list of episodes)

Production
- Executive producer: Phil Vischer
- Producers: Jeff Holder; Jason VanBorssum
- Running time: 31 minutes
- Production company: Big Idea Entertainment

Original release
- Network: Direct-to-video
- Release: March 16, 2002 – June 10, 2003

Related
- VeggieTales; 3-2-1 Penguins!

Larryboy: The Cartoon Adventures (also known as Larryboy) is an American direct-to-video animated science fiction comedy children's series developed by Tom Bancroft (a former animator for Disney) as a spin-off of the VeggieTales franchise created by Big Idea Entertainment. The first video titled "Larryboy and the Angry Eyebrows", was released on March 16, 2002. The videos came to an end with "The Good, The Bad and the Eggly!", released on June 10, 2003, due to Big Idea's bankruptcy. Unlike its predecessor VeggieTales, which was animated in CGI using Softimage 3D and later Autodesk Maya, LarryBoy was animated in 2D animation using Adobe Flash. From September 2006 to November 2009, NBC aired the content of all four videos on its Qubo block alongside airings of VeggieTales videos. LarryBoy also currently streams on Yippee TV, a Christian-based American children's subscription video on-demand over-the-top streaming service. Each video contains two segments, a twenty-minute long segment and a seven-minute short segment (Larryboy Super Short).

== Premise ==
The video series revolves around the character Larry's superhero alter ego Larryboy as he tries to manage his life as a superhero while working as a janitor for the Daily Bumble newspaper in Bumblyburg.

== Characters ==
Larryboy: The Cartoon Adventures only carries over four characters from VeggieTales: Larry the Cucumber, Bob the Tomato, Junior Asparagus, and Archibald Asparagus, with Mike Nawrocki, Phil Vischer and Lisa Vischer reprising their respective roles.

Voice actor	Role	Description
Mike Nawrocki	Larry the Cucumber	The janitor Larry and his superhero alter ego, Larryboy.
Phil Vischer	Archibald Asparagus	Larryboy's butler. Unlike previous Larryboy videos, this character is named Archie instead of Alfred.
Phil Vischer	Bob the Tomato	Larry's boss, who works as the head of the Daily Bumble newspaper.
Lisa Vischer	Junior Asparagus	A kid editor of the Daily Bumble.
Shari Belgeau	Vicky Cucumber	One of the members of the Daily Bumble. She is the love interest of Larry.
Shari Belgeau	Mother Pearl	The Alchemist's evil sidekick and mother.
Larry Whitaker	The Alchemist	A villain who appeared in the second video.
Larry Whitaker	Officer Olaf	Bumblyburg's resident policemen.
Larry Whitaker	Chief Croswell	Bumblyburg's resident policemen.
Larry Whitaker	Awful Alvin	A villain who first appeared in Larryboy and the Angry Eyebrows.
Larry Whitaker	Herbert and Wally	The eggplant brothers.
Marc Graue	Bok Choy	The wise teacher of the superhero class that Larryboy attends.
Anita Protich	Greta Von Gruesome	A villainess with a German accent who appeared in the final two videos.

== Videos ==
No.	Title	Directed by	Written by	Storyboards by	Original release date	Qubo air date
1	"Larryboy and the Angry Eyebrows"	Larry Whitaker; Supervising director: Tom Bancroft	Kent Redeker	Jeff Holder and Jason VanBorssum	March 16, 2002	September 30, 2006
Larryboy fights a "cheese-breathing cow dragon", but discovers that it is Herbert and Wally in disguise and the duo are arrested. Soon after, Larryboy breaks an inventor's "KnitMaster 3000" (which recycles hair collected in bathtub drains). Despite Larryboy's apology and the promise to repair the device, the inventor, Ma Mushroom, holds a grudge against him. Awful Alvin, planning to take control of Bumblyburg, releases eyebrows that force everyone to hold onto their anger. Soon, the eyebrows are attached to everyone who is angry. Larryboy confronts Alvin and soon an eyebrow attaches to him, which he lets go after remembering that he should let go of his anger. Soon, the citizens also let go of their anger and the eyebrows leave them. Larryboy, using the now-fixed KnitMaster, turns the eyebrows into a night cap. Alvin rues the loss of his eyebrows and his anger causes the eyebrows, now in night cap form, to entrap him. Alvin is arrested, and Ma (seeing the KnitMaster) lets go of her anger and her eyebrow leaves her. Larryboy Super Short: "Fly By Might": Larryboy is enjoying a vacation when a fly begins bothering him. Frustrated, he tries to kill it in every way possible but ends up knocking himself out. The short ends as the fly is enjoying its own drink on the unconscious Larryboy.
2	"Leggo My Ego!"	Larry Whitaker; Supervising director: Tom Bancroft	Brian Roberts, Sean Gaffney and Tod Carter	Dan Haskett, Bob McKnight, Bob Miller, and Trevor Wall	August 27, 2002	October 7, 2006
Larryboy is at the local carnival when the cotton candy machine malfunctions. Following its violent explosion, Archie discovers a bottled substance known as Ultra Sucrose Enhancement Catalyzer, which Officer Olaf suspects was used for "chemical sabotage" of the machine. Larryboy runs into the Alchemist and is about to smell his flower; however, Olaf warns against it just in time and Larryboy supposedly sniffs no trace of the spray from the flower. However, after the Alchemist is thrown in Olaf's van and driven off, Larryboy begins to feel superior to the entire town and puts down the citizens, causing them to be shrunk, captured, and taken to the Alchemist's lab. Larryboy soon realizes what he's done and arrives at the lab, only to be confronted by a much deadlier and more dangerous version of himself - the Alter Ego. After fighting it, Larryboy then remembers he needs help from Archie and his friends, which causes the Alter Ego to shrink and eventually disappear and returning the town residents to normal size. In retaliation, the Alchemist takes Bob hostage. After dropping him at Herbert and Wally's firing of jelly donut juice at him, he inadvertently releases the spray on his mother (Mother Pearl), who flings it back at him and shrinks him. Soon after, Mother Pearl and the Alchemist are apprehended by the cops. Larryboy Super Short: "Cuke of All Trades!": It is Larryboy's birthday, so he decides to go into the city. For a Tuesday, it is unusually quiet, and Larryboy hopes that no one has forgotten about his birthday. He goes into Mahoney's Bakery and decides to watch it while Mahoney himself goes out. Things turn chaotic quickly, resulting in the bakery and a candle shop across from it exploding on their interiors and Larryboy finding himself inside his own birthday cake. Mahoney returns and wishes him a happy birthday along with all of the other residents.
3	"The Yodelnapper!"	Larry Whitaker; Supervising director: Tom Bancroft	Kent Redeker, Bob Miller and Larry Whitaker	Dan Haskett, Bob McKnight, Bob Miller, and Trevor Wall	November 26, 2002	October 14, 2006
At Mr. Snappy's Extremely Gigantic Toy Emporium, Larryboy accidentally knocks down a chemistry set which falls on clay sets creating the monstrous Crazy Clay Monster. The monster attacks Larryboy, but he puts it asleep by playing a toy saxophone. Larryboy then goes to a concert of his favorite yodeler, Einger Warblethroat. However, the performance goes wrong when Greta Von Gruesome kidnaps Einger and takes him to her castle to join other yodelers that she is holding captive. Archie disguises Larryboy, who poses as a yodeler and gets "yodelnapped" and taken to the castle. Larry releases the trapped performers, but the group falls into a pit and is attacked by an army of Greta-controlled Hula Heidi dolls. After defeating the dolls with the help of Einger, Larryboy apprehends Greta. The five rescued yodelers then put on a "Tribute to Larryboy" concert. The Crazy Clay Monster returns to fight Larryboy, but is interrupted and begins dancing to polka music as the performers yodel Larryboy's theme song. Larryboy Super Short: "A Polar Pickle!": At the zoo, Archie and Larry are taking pictures of the polar bears in the exhibit. The little boy visits the penguin exhibit where he loses his toy fish into the exhibit. Two of the penguins think that it's a real fish and begin fighting over it while the boy cries over his lost toy. Larryboy pursues the penguins until one of them unintentionally helps him get the toy back. The boy proceeds to lose his toy again in the polar bear exhibit. Archie tries to summon Larryboy once again, but Larryboy is too exhausted.
4	"The Good, The Bad and the Eggly"	Larry Whitaker	Sean Roche and Larry Whitaker	Dave Bennett, Chris Hamilton, and Dan Haskett	June 10, 2003	November 4, 2006
Awful Alvin and Greta Von Gruesome are out of jail. After three flying pigs with bacon-and-egg guns shoot down the Larry-Plane, Larryboy is saved by the Dark Crow, who is the hero of a neighboring town. The two team up to fight the pair, but Larryboy makes a mistake and the two steal a machine called the Overeasy Egg Ray which turns anything not alive into eggs. Using it, they steal various antiques from a museum and kidnap Vicky. Larryboy and the Dark Crow are stripped of their supersuits and are captured. After getting free, Larryboy destroys the Overeasy Egg Ray but is knocked out. Larryboy is freed by the Dark Crow and the duo capture Alvin and Greta and send them back to jail. Larryboy Super Short: "Merry-Go-Wreck": Electro-Melon and Lemon Twist accidentally destroy The Bumblyburg Amusement Park over disagreements between each other. Larryboy arrives and questions the pair who look around with shame at what they've done. Working together, they repair the damages. The three then walk through the now-repaired amusement park while eating cotton candy and popcorn.

== Reception ==
In a mixed review, Scott Blakey of the Los Angeles Times Syndicate wrote that the series has "sly nods to comic book characters of the 1930s and the so-called golden age of animation" while referring to the series as a "breakthrough in reverse" for its use of 2D animation instead of 3D animation. In a more positive review, Richard LeCornte of the Reno Gazette-Journal writes that the series "succeeds at making its message pleasing to children and adults" and gave the series a B+.

The series was nominated for a Golden Reel Award in 2003 for Best Sound Editing in Direct to Video, but lost to The Adventures of Tom Thumb & Thumbelina. Vischer stated that fans of the original VeggieTales series criticized the series for its cheap-looking animation. Mixed with Big Idea's bankruptcy at the time, the series was cancelled after the release of only four videos.

== Home media ==
All of the videos were released in both VHS and DVD formats. They were also released as a set or included with the other Larryboy videos in: VeggieTales: Bumblyburg Super-Hero Value Pack (2004), VeggieTales: Larryboy Super Hero Power Pack (2012), and VeggieTales: Larryboy Ultimate Super Hero Collection (2019).

== In other media ==
=== Books ===
A series of nine chapter books based on the series was published by Zonderkidz between 2002 and 2004. The first five came out during the show's run, with the remaining four published after it ended, serving as a continuation. The books featured new stories set within the show's continuity, with Larryboy facing a variety of villains and challenges. Seven of the books were original stories, while two were adapted from the episodes "The Yodelnapper!" and "The Good, the Bad and the Eggly." The books were written by authors Sean Gaffney, Bob Katula, Kent Redeker, and Doug Peterson. The first book, LarryBoy and the Emperor of Envy, was later adapted as an episode of The VeggieTales Show in 2021.

==== Titles ====
1. LarryBoy and the Emperor of Envy (Sean Gaffney) (August 2002) ISBN 9780310704676: The city of Bumblyburg's in danger and LarryBoy's the only one who can save the day. Everyone is weak with jealousy after the diabolical Napoleon of Crime and Other Bad Stuff—a.k.a. the Emperor of Envy— tainted the Slushee supply with his envy formula during Mister Slushee's Slushee Slurping Contest. The Emperor has set the ultimate envy trap, and he and his "army" of henchmen are taking over the city of Bumblyburg. The whole town has slurped some of the Slushees, including LarryBoy. What will LarryBoy do? Will he conquer his own envy? If he doesn't stop the evil emperor, Bumblyburg will be destroyed forever.
2. LarryBoy and the Awful Ear Wacks Attacks (Bob Katula) (September 2002) ISBN 9780310704683: Ear wacks have attacked Bumblyburg! LarryBoy's fiendish nemesis, Alvin the Onion, is behind it and has unleashed the awful ear wacks to interfere with being a good listener. When LarryBoy falls into Alvin's awful trap and he can no longer listen, it's up to Junior Asparagus and LarryBoy's faithful butler and mentor, Archie, to foil the evil plot.What will come of Bumblyburg now that their superhero is under Alvin's awful spell? Will Junior and Archie be able to convince LarryBoy to listen to them in time to save Bumblyburg? Will LarryBoy's super-suction ears be saturated with evil for all time? Alvin's out to rule the city and LarryBoy forever!
3. LarryBoy and the Sinister Snow Day (Sean Gaffney) (February 2003) ISBN 9780310705611: The Veggie kids in Bumblyburg don't want to go to school. They're convinced that school is boring and they want a snow day―even in the middle of warm weather. The Veggie kids make friends with the snow peas who assure them that all their snow dreams "can come true"―and now Bumblyburg is in danger of becoming a frozen wasteland. Can LarryBoy fight Iceburg and his notorious band of snow peas―and show everyone that when you stop learning, you stop growing?
4. LarryBoy and the Yodelnapper (Kent Redeker) (February 2003) ISBN 9780310705628: LarryBoy goes undercover as a world-famous yodeler to foil the scheme of Green Greta, the Greedy Zucchini, who is kidnapping yodelers out of greed. Things go from bad to worse when LarryBoy tries to capture Greta and is attacked by an entire collection of Hula dolls. But instead of waging a Hawaiian war, LarryBoy sees this as a chance to complete his own Hula doll set. Does LarryBoy really need all the hula dolls? Will he realize how to be content before it's too late? Or will our hero be overtaken by his own greed? Find out in another exciting LarryBoy adventure!
5. Larryboy in the Good, the Bad, and the Eggly (Kent Redeker) (August 2003) ISBN 0310706505: LarryBoy and fellow superhero, Dark Crow, scramble to learn a lesson in sharing. But it doesn't come over-easy when they discover Greta Von Gruesome and Awful Alvin are the terrible team of trouble that has struck Bumblyburg with their new invention―the Over-Easy-Egg ray! Everything turns into a hard-boiled mess as this deceptive duo zaps everything in sight. LarryBoy has to learn that sharing means working together as he and Dark Crow team up to share the responsibilities of fighting this crime. Will LarryBoy learn that sharing means working together? Will he learn it before he and Dark Crow become the world's biggest superhero omelet?
6. LarryBoy in the Attack of Outback Jack (Doug Peterson) (August 2003) ISBN 0613716531: The Australian supervillain, Outback Jack, and his sidekick, Jackie, are in search of buried treasure in Bumblyburg. No veggie will stand in their way! LarryBoy has to rely on retired superhero, Pruneman, to help him. But before they can capture Outback Jack, they must first battle the Hilaria-Mosquito, which stings victims with a green gag gas that keeps them telling jokes…for hours! Will LarryBoy respect the wisdom that Pruneman has to offer? Or will the Hilaria-Mosquito make him the next super-comic?
7. Larryboy in the Amazing Brain Twister (Doug Peterson) (December 2003) ISBN 0613717260: The citizens of Bumblyburg are no longer showing compassion! They are committing outrageous crimes and giving into peer-pressure amidst some unusually stormy weather. Something is amiss in the city of Bumblyburg, and LarryBoy is out to discover who's behind these evil doings. Little does he know, it's none other than the evil genius, Plum Loco. This cold-hearted plum has created a new device called the Brain-twister which rages through town mixing up brains, causing the citizens of Burblyburg to end up on the receiving end of their own teasing. How will LarryBoy calm this storm and show everyone the importance of being kind?
8. Larryboy and the Abominable Trashman (Doug Peterson) (December 2003) ISBN 0310706521: Something smells very fishy in the city of Bumblyburg. It also smells like moldy gym shoes, rotten eggs, and spoiled milk. What's to blame? The Abominable Trashman, one of the weirdest, wildest creatures to ever leap out of a garbage can!The Abominable Trashman and his evil creator, Awful Alvin, are spreading fear throughout Bumblyburg and turning the citizens into slaves of their own fear. Is Bumblyburg doomed to become a smelly trash heap for all-time? LarryBoy must battle the foul monster to rescue the city, but first, he must battle his own fears.
9. Larryboy Versus the Volcano! (Doug Peterson) (August 2004) ISBN 0310707285: When LarryBoy and his superhero buddies are invited to Superhero Island, they are in for a surprise of volcanic proportions. Trouble erupts when LarryBoy discovers he's a second-class citizen, because he doesn't have "super" powers like his buddies. Bumblyburg's newest supervillain, Chili Pepper and his henchman Coconut, are cooking up a plot for disaster to destroy all superheroes. Will Larryboy help after his vacation is ruined and his friends treat him poorly? Kids will enjoy the adventure of finding out as Larryboy tumbles into a secret hideaway and uncovers Chili Pepper's tourist trap. But is it too late when the volcano explodes? Will LarryBoy save himself or will he save the day before the island is covered in hot, molten chili? How will Larryboy learn that everyone is important in God's eyes, even after being excluded from his friends?
