= Yippee TV =

American subscription video television network and streaming service

- Type: OTT video streaming platform
- Country: United States
- Headquarters: Tustin, California, U.S.

Programming
- Language: English
- Picture format: 4k resolution; 1080i HDTV

Ownership
- Owner: Trinity Broadcasting Network
- Parent: Yippee Entertainment, Inc.

History
- Launched: December 4, 2019; 6 years ago
- Founder: Brandon Piety

Links
- Website: www.yippee.tv

Yippee TV (also known as simply Yippee) is a Christian-based American children’s subscription video on-demand over-the-top streaming service, founded in and launched on December 4, 2019 and is based in Tustin, California. Through a partnership with NBCUniversal and Big Idea Entertainment, Yippee TV became one of the few streaming services offering the Christian computer generated musical children's animation series The VeggieTales Show since 2019. Yippee TV also features several series produced or distributed by The Jim Henson Company, including The Wubbulous World of Dr. Seuss and The Doozers.

== History ==
Yippee TV was founded by Brandon Piety in Los Angeles and is accessible worldwide on Roku (including Roku Premium Subscriptions), AppleTV, Fire TV, Samsung TV, LG Smart TV, Vizio, iOS, and Android apps. Regarding the vision behind the streaming service, Piety explained that Yippee "was built by parents for parents. There are no ads, algorithms, or attitudes, and the shows on our platform are safe and actually fun." Each title is reviewed by a "Yippee Content Committee" and by "real Christian parents." When the service launched in December 2019, Yippee TV had over 1000 hours of streaming content.

Since its inception, Yippee TV has added new content weekly, and as of August 2024 has over 250 different series on the platform totaling thousands of hours of content. In addition to several original productions, Yippee TV has partnered with numerous content creators to provide curated family-friendly content for kids and families since 2019.

In January 2025, Trinity Broadcasting Network (TBN) shut down its Smile children’s channel and migrated all of its content to Yippee TV.

In August 2025, Yippee TV announced that it would be streaming season 3 of the Christian Broadcasting Network (CBN)-produced animated series Superbook.

== Programming ==
Yippee TV's programming consists of a mix of original series, licensed content, and curated YouTube creators, all reviewed by a "Yippee Content Committee" of parents before being added to the platform. When the service launched in December 2019, it had over 1,000 hours of streaming content, and as of August 2024 the platform features over 250 different series totaling thousands of hours.

=== Original programming ===
Yippee TV produces several original series exclusive to the platform. These include Daily Devo Show, a weekday devotional program for children, Life of Riley, a behind-the-scenes series starring Riley Rose from Arts and Crafts by 3 Sisters, and Maggie's Market. The platform also features ten exclusive episodes and songs from Danny Go! that are not available on other services.

=== Licensed and acquired programming ===
Through a partnership with NBCUniversal (via DreamWorks Classics and Big Idea Entertainment), Yippee TV became the exclusive streaming service for The VeggieTales Show in 2019, releasing new episodes monthly through 2022. The platform also carries classic VeggieTales episodes, VeggieTales Remix, LarryBoy: The Cartoon Adventures, and 3-2-1 Penguins!, as well as Jay Jay the Jet Plane, Tutenstein and Adventures from the Book of Virtues under license from Trinity Animation Group through the 2018 acquisition of the animated library of PorchLight Entertainment.
