= List of VeggieTales characters =

Characters from VeggieTales, from left to right: Jerry Gourd, Madame Blueberry, Archibald Asparagus, Laura Carrot, Bob the Tomato, Jimmy Gourd, Larry the Cucumber, Junior Asparagus, a French Pea and Petunia Rhubarb.

This is a list of cast and characters from VeggieTales, an American computer-generated children's series and franchise. The series presents life lessons from a biblical world view featuring various garden-variety vegetable and fruit characters retelling Bible stories and parodying pop culture. Many of the primary characters were established in the early episodes of the direct-to-video series, such as Bob the Tomato, Larry the Cucumber, Junior Asparagus, and Laura Carrot, among other produce.

== Primary characters ==
=== Bob the Tomato ===
- Voiced by Phil Vischer

Bob the Tomato (introduced 1993) is a confident but meticulous tomato and the host of VeggieTales. Very much a well-intentioned teacher at heart, Series' creator Phil Vischer often cites Bob as being his "inner Mr. Rogers...though a frustrated Mr. Rogers, because he couldn't get things to go as smoothly." From a kitchen countertop alongside his best friend and co-host, Larry the Cucumber, Bob does his best to put on a show that will achieve his big dreams of changing the world ... despite getting a tad cranky when his plans inevitably go awry.

Originally, Bob made his first appearance in a 1992 short entitled "VeggieTales Promo: Take 38" where he gives a passionate speech pitching the concept of VeggieTales. Eventually, he made his official public debut a year later hosting the first episode entitled "Where's God When I'm S-Scared?" and became the de facto leader of the VeggieTales gang. Throughout the series, Bob often assumes character roles in the story segments but most often is the narrator or storyteller. He also has a tech-savvy superhero alter-ego Thingamabob, who is a member of the League of Incredible Vegetables and partakes in some of the "Silly Songs with Larry" segments – even performing his own Silly Song, "Lance the Turtle."

In the Netflix original series VeggieTales in the House and VeggieTales in the City, Bob is seen living with Larry as a roommate inside a small Veggie-sized house on their kitchen countertop from the original direct-to-video series. In a slight departure from his usual portrayal, Bob is seen engaging in activities such as sock collecting, weather observation and taking on various odd-jobs. For The VeggieTales Show, Bob returns to his hosting duties as the director and master of ceremonies for the stage shows the Veggies put on in Mr. Nezzer's theater. Here, his role is much more akin to that of Kermit the Frog from The Muppet Show, which was a direct inspiration for this series.

=== Larry the Cucumber ===
- Voiced by Mike Nawrocki

Larry the Cucumber (introduced 1993) is an optimistic and whimsical cucumber, Bob's best friend, and the co-host of VeggieTales. Larry's defining characteristics are his singular toothy grin and his child-like personality. Regarding the basic nature of Bob and Larry's relationship, Phil Vischer has stated that "Bob wants to help kids, Larry wants to help Bob." But because Larry usually gets distracted with his own whimsical ideas, he can add more to Bob's frustration rather than take away from it. Despite it all, Larry remains loyal and always finds a way to help Bob finish a show or teach kids a valuable lesson.

Phil Vischer first conceived Larry as a chocolate bar, but Vischer's wife, Lisa, said that parents would not like videos starring a candy bar because it might encourage poor eating habits. After being turned into a cucumber, Larry was used to make a twenty-second animation test called "Mr. Cuke's Screen Test," which was the genesis of VeggieTales. Larry then appeared in "VeggieTales Promo: Take 38" chasing after his blue wind-up lobster toy while Bob gave his speech. However, Larry's public debut was in the first episode, "Where's God When I'm S-Scared?" featuring him as the titular role in a retelling of Daniel in the Lions' Den. In later story segments, Larry takes on many character roles and develops several recurring alter-egos, such as Minnesota Cuke (a parody of Indiana Jones), a member of the infamous Pirates Who Don't Do Anything, and LarryBoy – a comical plunger-headed superhero. LarryBoy eventually spawned a franchise in its own right, leading to many standalone episodes, a spin-off called Larryboy: The Cartoon Adventures and the character continually features in subsequent VeggieTales spin-offs. Larry also has his own recurring musical segment called "Silly Songs with Larry," which feature humorous musical numbers. This is a very popular staple of the VeggieTales franchise and has been featured in nearly every episode of the original series, including several sing-along and compilation videos.

In VeggieTales in the House and VeggieTales in the City, Larry is Bob's roommate in an Odd Couple scenario where Larry is the Oscar to Bob's Felix. In these series, Larry's interests and hobbies consist of such silly activities as eating sardines, riding his bike on the ceiling, and playing make-believe. Like Bob, he is also seen working part-time jobs. In The VeggieTales Show, Larry acts more like his old self, often presenting wacky ideas backstage before the shows begin and still writing occasional Silly Songs, including writing the series' theme song as seen in the pilot episode "God Wants Us To Make Peace."

=== Junior Asparagus ===
- Voiced by Lisa Vischer (1993–2014; 2019–2022), Tress MacNeille (2014–2017)

Junior Asparagus (introduced 1993) is a little green asparagus who is one of the co-stars of VeggieTales. He is an impressionable and adventurous five-year-old boy usually clad in a yellow ball cap with a red brim. While mild-mannered, Junior's curiosity will sometimes lead him into trouble. But at the end of the day, Junior always finds his way back home to his loving and attentive parents.

Junior has had several starring roles in the series, including his debut in "Where's God When I'm S-Scared?" as well as "Dave and the Giant Pickle", "Lyle the Kindly Viking" and "Pistachio – The Little Boy That Woodn't." He also has a prominent role in most "LarryBoy" episodes, eventually becoming the superhero in training Ricochet in "The League of Incredible Vegetables." In the "Silly Songs," Junior is a band member of Boyz in the Sink, alongside Larry, Mr. Lunt, and Jimmy. He also has his own bedtime-themed Silly Song called "Goodnight Junior." Notably, Junior is one of the few characters to co-host the show with Bob instead of Larry, as seen in the episodes "Josh and the Big Wall!" and "Abe and the Amazing Promise."

In VeggieTales in the House and VeggieTales in the City, Junior is seen living with his family in a house made from a human-sized refrigerator. He is shown doing more common activities, like going to elementary school or playing with his friends or his dad. He also got a new super alter-ego named Junior Jetpack, who sometimes fights alongside LarryBoy. In The VeggieTales Show, Junior has a prominent role helping perform in the shows put on in the theater. Junior is revealed to be homeschooled in this series, allowing him to participate in the shows and rehearsals during the day. He also reprises his roles as Dave from "Dave and the Giant Pickle" in the episode "Little Things Matter" and as Ricochet in some of the "LarryBoy" episodes.

=== Petunia Rhubarb ===
- Voiced by Cydney Trent (2005–2014), Tress MacNeille (2014–2017), Kira Buckland (2019–2022)

Petunia Rhubarb (introduced 2005) is a red-headed rhubarb and one of the lead female protagonists in the series. She has a bubbly personality and is a strong advocate for such values as inner beauty, self-worth and empathy. Petunia does not resemble a typical rhubarb, having solid-green skin and appears more humanoid in her design and features. She often dresses in business-casual clothes outside the stories, and has red hair that is usually braided into a ponytail. Her first appearance was in "Duke and the Great Pie War" playing the part of Princess "Sweet Sweet" Petunia – the scorned "Ruth" figure waiting to be redeemed by Larry's "Boaz". Because of this, Petunia is often paired with Larry as a female co-star. She later appeared as the title character in another princess-themed episode, "Sweetpea Beauty". Petunia also has a reoccurring role in the LarryBoy episodes as a reporter and later her own fashionista super alter-ego Vogue. She also sang alongside Larry in the Silly Song, "Where Have All The Staplers Gone?". She sings the “What Have We Learned” song in many episodes.

In VeggieTales in the House and VeggieTales in the City, she appears as the owner of a flower shop and works alongside her best friend Tina Celerina. She appears with her hair unbraided and wearing a purple flower-print dress. Petunia also worked part-time at Pa Grape's General Store early on in the series, and is seen helping Archibald in various episodes as an assistant. In The VeggieTales Show, she is the leader of the VeggieTales Fan Club and provides the letters from kids to help inspire the theme for each show. She also reprises her role as Vogue in some of the "LarryBoy" episodes.

=== Laura Carrot ===
- Voiced by Kristen Blegen (1995–2005), Jackie Ritz (2002–2005), Megan Murphy Chambers (2009), Keri Pisapia (2010–2013), Gigi Abraham (2014), Tress MacNeille (2014–2017), Kira Buckland (2019–2022)

Laura Carrot (introduced 1995) is a young carrot and Junior's best friend. She has freckles and yellow hair that is tied into two pigtails. She first appeared in "The Story of Flibber-o-loo" as a background character and got her first major speaking role in "Rack, Shack and Benny". Laura doesn't get many starring roles, but often gets a chance in the spotlight when a young female lead is needed. For example, in "Princess and the Popstar" she plays Princess Poppyseed, in "Babysitter in De-Nile" she plays Miriam, and in "Celery Night Fever" she plays herself. Her more notable supporting roles include the first two "LarryBoy" episodes, "Saint Nicholas: A Story of Joyful Giving", and starring in the subplot of the Jonah feature film. Laura also has her own Silly Song titled "B.F.F" where she sings with her friend Lavinia while using texting slang for lyrics.

In VeggieTales in the House and VeggieTales in the City, Laura appears much more overall, starring in many episodes as the lead character. She appears in the first episode, learning a lesson in responsibility alongside Larry while earning money to adopt puppies. Laura is also shown having an affinity for other animals, such as owning a pet guppy, starting an animal-sitting service, and even becoming "The Guppy Whisperer" to help other Veggies take care of their pets. She lives in a carrot-shaped house built into the side of the kitchen island. She goes to school with Junior, where she also befriends a bullied girl named Callie Flower. Laura also gained the superhero persona Night Pony after being mentored by the retired Granny Asparagus. In The VeggieTales Show, Laura returns to help the Veggie gang put on their shows, but appears less often than the others. She has notable roles in the episodes "The Power of Love" and "Naaman Takes A Bath" where she has a crush on a Veggie pop-star named Jimmy Lucky and trains as Bob's assistant stage manager, respectively.

=== Mr. Lunt ===
- Voiced by Phil Vischer

Mr. Lunt (introduced 1995) is a yellow decorative gourd with a Hispanic accent who grew up in New Jersey. He is often the source of off-beat humor but doesn't shy away from being argumentative at times. His notable features include his brown pencil thin mustache and his lack of any eyes, which forces him to use the brim of his panama hat or eyebrow wrinkles for expression. He originally had a gold tooth, but it was removed in later episodes. Mr. Lunt first appears in "Rack, Shack & Benny" as Mr. Nezzer's assistant and sidekick. The pair were typically seen as the series' "bad guys" in early VeggieTales episodes, usually being redeemed by the episode's end. Mr. Lunt has also appeared as an individual antagonist, such as playing Haman in "Esther... the Girl Who Became Queen" and Otis the Elevated in "Duke and the Great Pie War". He also prominently appears as one of the Pirates Who Don't Do Anything and as the leader of the Veggie boy band, Boyz in the Sink. In addition to his Boyz songs, Mr. Lunt has starred in two of his own Silly Songs, "His Cheeseburger" and "Donuts for Benny". He also got a superhero alter-ego in the "LarryBoy" episodes as a quick caped-crusader named S-Cape, who is a member of the League of Incredible Vegetables.

In VeggieTales in the House and VeggieTales in the City, Mr. Lunt appears less often in quick cameo appearances. He was shown to have various jobs, such as a delivery guy and as the owner of his own repair shop. Mr. Lunt's most notable appearance was in the episode "The Missing Jetpack" where he learns a lesson about telling the truth after lying to Junior about losing his jetpack. Mr. Lunt returned with a more prominent role in The VeggieTales Show, often contributing wild ideas and skits that usually end in disaster. Some of his contributions include taking on the role of Wink Gourdindale to host a game show called "Wheel of Bravery", selling a product called "Relationship Glue", and diving into a vat of eggnog. Mr. Lunt also reprises his role as S-Cape in the "LarryBoy" episodes.

=== Madame Blueberry ===
- Voiced by Megan Moore Burns (1998), Gail Freeman-Bock (1999), Jackie Ritz (2002–2009), Megan Murphy Chambers (2006–2014), Tress MacNeille (2014–2017), Stephanie Southerland (2019–2022)

Madame Blueberry (introduced 1998) is a French blueberry with a French accent. She first appeared as the titular character in "Madame Blueberry", where her name and the theme of the episode are both allusions to the tale of Madame Bovary. As such, Madame Blueberry was cast early on as a vain character who struggles to be thankful. She usually wears fancy clothes and accessories, such as brown or yellow wigs, pearls, and heavy makeup. Although a blueberry, she is similar in size to Bob the Tomato and much larger than the similarly sized in-real-life French Peas. Madame Blueberry also has a reoccurring role as the Mayor of Bumblyburg in the "LarryBoy" episodes.

For VeggieTales in the House and VeggieTales in the City, Madame Blueberry appeared as a much more stuffy character, so much so that her voice changed to having a RP accent. Although still hailing from France, she was portrayed liking very stereotypical British things, such as cups of tea and minding her manners. She is even seen living in a blue teapot-shaped house built into the side of the kitchen island. On some occasions, she donned the persona "Madame Clue-berry" to solve mysteries, all the while being rather clueless. She also garnered the nickname "Madame Blue" from her friends. When Madame returned for The VeggieTales Show, she started acting more like she did in the original series and had her French accent once again. She also leans more heavily into her role as a singer, now calling herself a "French opera singer". She also reprises her role as the Mayor for a few "LarryBoy" episodes.

=== Pa Grape ===
- Voiced by Phil Vischer

Pa Grape (introduced 1994) is a wise, elderly green grape. He has a bushy white mustache and eyebrows, wears a black top hat, glasses, and speaks with a slight Yiddish accent. Pa is often seen as a trusted authority figure amongst the VeggieTales cast, though he sometimes comes off as senile when he shares some of his slightly odder anecdotes. According to an interview in the "What's the Big Idea?" magazine, Pa stated he was held back in the second grade for thirteen years and was worried about his lack of any physical eyes. Pa made his first appearance in "God Wants Me to Forgive Them!?!" as the father of the Grapes of Wrath. He is typically cast as a sage or fatherly figure, including such roles as Mordecai in "Esther... The Girl Who Became Queen", and the angel sent to guide Gideon (Larry the Cucumber) in "Gideon: Tuba Warrior". He also has a reoccurring role as the captain of the Pirates Who Don't Do Anything, appearing alongside Larry and Mr. Lunt and starring as the lead of the film. Pa likes to invent and tinker as well, a part of his personality that is influenced by his role as the eccentric Victorian inventor Seymour Schwenk in the holiday specials "The Star of Christmas" and "An Easter Carol".

When Pa appeared in VeggieTales in the House and VeggieTales in the City, he appeared with eyes for the very first time, as well as gaining a tinier hat and a bushier mustache that completely covered his mouth. He is seen owning a general store in the house, built into the side of the kitchen island. His store is used as the setting for many of the episodes. He almost always tries teaching a lesson or giving biblical advice to the other Veggies, but is initially ignored on occasion. For The VeggieTales Show, Pa appears frequently as a narrator for the show's Bible story segments and often helps decide what Bible stories are best to use for the topic of the day's show.

=== Jimmy and Jerry Gourd ===
- Jimmy Gourd: Voiced by Phil Vischer
- Jerry Gourd: Voiced by Mike Nawrocki

Jimmy and Jerry Gourd (introduced 1995) are gourd brothers who appear as a secondary comic duo. Despite being very similar and hard to tell apart, the two have some traits to help them stand out from each other. For example, Jimmy is orange and very talkative with a boisterous personality. Jerry is yellow and more soft-spoken and monotone. The pair debuted together in "Are You My Neighbor?" portraying the "new guys" and establishing their love of eating and singing show tunes. A notable appearance of the duo is the opening of "King George and the Ducky", where they wear cardboard cutout costumes of Bob and Larry in an attempt to impersonate them and take over the show and tell a very short and rushed story called "The Englishman Who Went Up A Hill And Came Down With All The Bananas".

Although inseparable, Jimmy often appears in starring roles without his brother, such as the "Omelet" and "Dr. Jiggle and Mr. Sly" story segments and as a member of Boyz in the Sink. Additionally, during the run of VeggieTales on TV!, Jimmy maintained a presence outside of the main story segments by portraying the mailman who delivered the fan letters to Bob and Larry, while his brother only appeared within the episode stories. Jerry's notable appearances without Jimmy include playing the Swede in "The Englishman Who Went Up a Hill and Came Down with All the Bananas" and alongside Mr. Lunt in "His Cheeseburger" (furthering his and his brother's reputation of loving to eat).

In VeggieTales in the House and VeggieTales in the City, Jimmy and Jerry were shown as Bob and Larry's neighbors, living in the pantry on the other end of the kitchen countertop. The Gourd brothers also own pets in the series – a dust bunny named Danny and a guppy named Happy Sunshine Bubbles. They returned for The VeggieTales Show as well, appearing both backstage and onstage to help put on the shows in the theater.

=== Archibald Asparagus ===
- Voiced by Phil Vischer

Archibald Asparagus (introduced 1993) serves as the stereotypical role of a stuffy, classically educated British "gentleman" in contrast with the rest of his zany co-stars. He typically wears a red bowtie, has a monocle on his right eye, and speaks with an Oxford English accent. Archibald first appeared in the 1992 short "VeggieTales Promo: Take 38" to interrupt and object to the creation of such a show as VeggieTales, claiming it to be utter nonsense. Archibald made his official debut in "Where's God When I'm S-Scared?", playing the regal King Darius role in the story segment of "Daniel and the Lion's Den". This episode also started the continuing theme of his distaste for Larry's Silly Song segments. He often claimed they were "too silly", a sentiment greatly emphasized when he interrupts "The Water Buffalo Song" to chastise Larry (his first appearance in the actual series). Eventually, he learns to loosen up in "The End of Silliness?" after an incident in "Madame Blueberry" where he cancelled "Silly Songs with Larry" and replaced it with "Love Songs with Mr. Lunt" and learned how much the segment meant to Larry and VeggieTales fans. Archibald later appears in other Silly Songs specifically starring him, including "The Biscuit of Zazzamarandabo" and "Astonishing Wigs". Archibald also has a recurring role as LarryBoy's faithful butler Alfred (who is just called "Archibald" in the 2D cartoon spin-off series) and was featured as the title character in Jonah: A VeggieTales Movie. Archibald has also been a narrator for "The Good Egg of Gooseville" and "Lyle the Kindly Viking", where in the latter he got to host the show in the style of Masterpiece Theatre.

For VeggieTales in the House and VeggieTales in the City, Archibald was portrayed as the mayor of the town inside the house. Because of his social status, he was regarded as a bureaucrat and a more authoritative character as a result. He was mostly seen doing mayoral duties such as public speeches. However, his new job didn't keep him from engaging in more fun social activities with the other Veggies, such as camping trips and birthday parties. For The VeggieTales Show, Archibald resumes his regular role from the original series. He appears frequently onstage as a performer, often narrating the Bible story segments. He also reappears as Alfred in the "LarryBoy" episodes.

=== Mr. Nezzer ===
- Voiced by Phil Vischer (1995–2014; 2021–2022), David Mann (2019–2021)

Mr. Nezzer (introduced 1995) is a rich, middle-aged zucchini businessman. Always seen in a formal shirt and a necktie, he is appropriately business-minded, but sometimes is a tad egotistical. Although always included in the VeggieTales gang, he is somewhat aloof compared to the others because of his social status as the owner of many successful companies and businesses. Often cast in antagonistic roles, Mr. Nezzer himself truly isn't a villain. Often he or the characters he plays are just misguided in their actions and are redeemed by an episode's end. A great example is his debut in "Rack, Shack & Benny" as the whimsical yet menacing chocolate factory owner Nebby K. Nezzer. It is also in this episode that Nezzer performs the fan-favorite and controversial song "The Bunny Song". Other notable roles include playing toy factory owner Wally P. Nezzer in "The Toy That Saved Christmas", King Xerxes in "Esther... The Girl Who Became Queen", Olaf in "Lyle the Kindly Viking", and Victorian theater and Easter egg factory owner Ebenezer Nezzer in "The Star of Christmas" and "An Easter Carol".

Mr. Nezzer was absent in VeggieTales in the House and VeggieTales in the City due to DreamWorks (who produced the series) perceiving the character's voice as perpetuating an African-American stereotype being voiced by Phil Vischer (who is a White man and based Nezzer's voice on Ken Page's performance as Oogie Boogie in The Nightmare Before Christmas). In turn, Nezzer was replaced with a similar-looking but different sounding character named Ichabeezer. Mr. Nezzer eventually returned for The VeggieTales Show as the owner of the theater the Veggies use for their new series. He mostly makes short appearances in each episode to announce the curtain call for the beginning of each show, much to Bob's dismay for wanting more time to prepare. However, Nezzer did appear onstage at least once in a character role, portraying King Saul in the episode "Little Things Matter".

=== The French Peas ===
- Jean-Claude Pea: Voiced by Mike Nawrocki
- Phillipe Pea: Voiced by Phil Vischer
- Cristoffe Pea: Voiced by Chris Olsen

The French Peas (introduced 1996) are a vast group of mischievous green peas with French accents. Usually only represented by Jean-Claude and Phillipe, they are sometimes joined by other French Peas, including one named Cristoffe, who appears infrequently. The Peas are often a source of comedy for the series and function as ancillary crew members behind the scenes. Among many other peas, Jean-Claude and Cristoffe debuted portraying the Philistines in "Dave and the Giant Pickle" as an allusion to the French soldiers in Monty Python and the Holy Grail. Phillipe later appeared alongside Jean-Claude in "Josh and the Big Wall!" as the slushie-attacking guards of Jericho, furthering the allusion to the Monty Python characters and directly parodying the behavior of tormenting passersby with strange, nonsensical threats, then ambushing them with unusual weapons. The Peas continue appearing in subsequent episodes, often playing mischievous or supporting characters. The French Peas have also taken over the show in a few instances, including when Jean-Claude narrated in the episode "Madame Blueberry" and when they assisted Archibald in "Lyle the Kindly Viking" to somewhat disastrous results. They also have their own Silly Song, "Hopperena" in the episode "'Twas the Night Before Easter". They only speak French.

When appearing in VeggieTales in the House and VeggieTales in the City, Jean-Claude and Phillipe appeared very infrequently as tertiary characters. The only starring role was Jean-Claude appearing solo in the episode "Pa Grape's Son" going to a father-son day festival with Pa Grape as his "father-for-the-day" while his real dad is in France. Both Jean-Claude and Phillipe returned for The VeggieTales Show, assisting backstage as stagehands and prop makers in addition to appearing onstage in the shows.

== Secondary characters ==
=== Qwerty ===
- Voiced by Mike Nawrocki

Qwerty (introduced 1993) is the desktop computer seen on the kitchen countertop, with which Bob and Larry use to read the Bible verse at the end of each show. Qwerty's name is derived from the first six letters that appear on a standard English keyboard. Though Qwerty is not alive per se, he does have certain anthropomorphic characteristics, including some emoting and voice activation. Qwerty is not always perfect at retrieving the verse, usually sputtering and taking a moment to load it. In the first episode, "Where's God When I'm S-Scared?", Qwerty accidentally posts a meatloaf recipe instead of a Bible verse.

According to Phil Vischer, the original design for Qwerty was based on an IBM 5150 model computer. Qwerty was slightly updated in "Abe and the Amazing Promise", giving two verses instead of one, and got a more life-changing update in the episode "Pistachio - The Little Boy That Woodn't" where he got a voice chip installed. The design of the new update, including a sleeker look and a black screen instead of the original blue, is reminiscent of an Apple iMac. While Qwerty did not appear in VeggieTales in the House or VeggieTales in the City, he was mentioned in the episode "The Lost Dust Bunny" in the latter series. Qwerty did not appear in The VeggieTales Show because Phil Vischer felt that he did not fit in with the theater setting. However, Qwerty is credited for appearing in some of the "LarryBoy" episodes as LarryBoy's computer.

=== Mom and Dad Asparagus ===
- Mom Asparagus: Voiced by Gail Freeman-Bock (1993), Lisa Vischer (1995–2012), Jackie Ritz (2002–2004), Megan Murphy Chambers (2006), Keri Pisapia (2011–2012), Tress MacNeille (2014–2017)
- Dad Asparagus: Voiced by Dan Anderson (1993–2011), Mike Nawrocki (2002), J. Chris Wall (2012), Rob Paulsen (2014–2017)

Mom and Dad Asparagus (introduced 1993) are Junior's caring and supportive parents. They appear in the series to give Junior advice or teach him how to behave properly. They first appeared in "Where's God When I'm S-Scared?" in traditional parental roles as their son deals with facing his fears. Both parents appear more prominently in the early videos, with Dad appearing more often as the series goes on. They are almost always together or alongside Junior. Unlike most other VeggieTales characters, Mom and Dad usually appear as themselves and not in character roles. Probably their biggest roles to date are as Reverend Gilbert and his wife, Mrs. Gilbert, in the holiday specials "The Star of Christmas" and "An Easter Carol". They also can both be seen in the original opening theme song for the series alongside their son with Bob and Larry. Originally, both parents were simply named "Dad" and "Mom" respectively, but they were given the more proper names "Mike and Lisa" (after VeggieTales co-creator Mike Nawrocki and his wife, Lisa) for the VeggieTales in the House series. Mike is also referred to as "Captain Mike" and portrayed having a job as an astronaut.

=== The Scallions ===
- Scallion #1: Voiced by Phil Vischer
- Scallion #2: Voiced by Mike Nawrocki
- Scallion #3: Voiced by Mike Sage (1993–2003), Brian K. Roberts (2006–2012), Mike Nawrocki (2014-2021)

The Scallions (introduced 1993) are a trio of devious scallions who are among the most consistent antagonists in VeggieTales, having appeared as bandits, swindlers, salesmen, and many other rapscallion types. Their debut was as the Wisemen opposite Larry's "Daniel" in the "Daniel and the Lions' Den" segment from "Where's God When I'm S-Scared?". They all have no names, simply referred to as Scallion #1, #2 and #3. Scallion #1 is the tallest and leader of the group, with a long purple nose, and is often seen with his stalks slicked back to mimic a ducktail hairstyle and an Oxford English accent. Scallion #2 is the second tallest with a small greenish yellow nose, while Scallion #3 is the shortest of the trio and has a big blue nose. They also participate with Frankencelery to form a group of quartet singers for the Silly Song "The Yodeling Veterinarian of the Alps" as well as the songs "Listen" and "A Helping Hand". Occasionally, one of the Scallions will make a solo appearance. For example, Scallion #1 appeared as a salesman selling the Forgive-O-Matic device in "God Wants Me to Forgive Them!?!" and as the Englishman and Cedric in "King George and the Ducky". Scallion #3 also appeared as the Milk Money Bandit in "LarryBoy and the Rumor Weed".

=== Scooter ===
- Voiced by Jim Poole (1995–2014), Tim Hodge (2005–2006), Sean Chiplock (2021–2022)

Scooter (introduced 1995) is a feisty and rather eccentric Scottish carrot. He has a Scottish accent and a bushy white mustache and eyebrows. He first appeared as the ship engineer of the U.S.S. Applepies (in a parody of Scotty from the original Star Trek television series) in "The Gourds Must Be Crazy" segment from "Are You My Neighbor?". Scooter has also gone on to have many substantial supporting roles in the videos, such as the slightly savage Moyer in "The Star of Christmas" and its sequel, "An Easter Carol", as well as a recurring role as a police officer in the "LarryBoy" episodes. Another significant starring role is as the eccentric Mr. Butterbun in "Dr. Jiggle and Mr. Sly" from "A Snoodle's Tale". Scooter is also very proud of his Scottish heritage, as seen in the Silly Song "Kilts and Stilts".

=== George ===
- Voiced by Phil Vischer

George (introduced 1995) is an old green onion with a handlebar mustache who often narrates some of the episodes. He first appeared in "Rack, Shack, and Benny" to act as the chocolate factory's security guard and narrated the story. George later narrates in "The Toy That Saved Christmas", where he is portrayed as a postman and revealed to be the grandfather of Annie. After a twelve-year break, George reappeared to narrate again in "Tomato Sawyer and Huckleberry Larry's Big River Rescue" as the storyteller Clark Wayne (a parody of Mark Twain). George made a few small appearances throughout the rest of the original series, often playing elderly or wise characters.

=== Annie ===
- Voiced by Shelby Vischer (1996–2002), Ally Nawrocki (2005–2010), Maggie Roberts (2011–2013), Megan Murphy Chambers (2014)

Annie (introduced 1996) is a little green onion girl who is friends with Junior and Laura. She has short brown hair, wears glasses, and usually has a hair bow with a matching blouse or skirt. She first appeared in "The Toy That Saved Christmas" being told a bedtime story by her grandpa, George. Annie later appeared in "Madame Blueberry", playing a poor girl who shows Madame Blueberry how to be thankful. Annie's parents appeared with her as well, in silent cameo roles. Her father and mother were respectively modeled after Phil and Lisa Vischer as an inside joke by concept artist Joseph Sapulich. Annie has made subsequent appearances, often seen alongside Junior and the other Veggie kids, such as the "Bully Trouble" segment from "Minnesota Cuke and the Search for Samson's Hairbrush" and the Jonah film.

=== Percy and Li'l Pea ===
- Percy Pea: Voiced by Phil Vischer
- Li'l Pea: Voiced by Lesly Benodin (1996–1999), Mike Nawrocki (2005–2020)

Percy and Li'l Pea (introduced 1996) are pea brothers and friends of Junior, Laura and Annie. They first appear in "The Toy That Saved Christmas" alongside their friends and parents. Their largest supporting roles are in "Larry-Boy! And the Fib from Outer Space!", "Larry-Boy and the Rumor Weed", and "Bully Trouble" from "Minnesota Cuke and the Search for Samson's Hairbrush".

=== Oscar the Polish Caterer ===
- Voiced by Mike Nawrocki

Oscar the Polish Caterer (introduced 2005) is a pale yellow gourd with a Polish accent. He has black hair with a mustache and often wears a chef's hat and an apron. Oscar usually appears in culinary roles, such as a food caterer, a chef, and an ice cream man. He was first mentioned in the Silly Song "Love My Lips" by Larry as he recounts meeting him in lip therapy. Although Oscar's first proper appearance in the series was in the Silly Song "The Blues with Larry", he originally debuted on the album A Very Veggie Christmas to cater the Veggie's Christmas party and sing "The Eight Polish Foods of Christmas", which he later reprised as a Silly Song for "The Little Drummer Boy". Oscar continued to make cameo appearances in episodes throughout the late 2000s and into the 2010s.

=== Miss Achmetha ===
- Voiced by Charlotte Jackson (2000–2011), Gail Freeman-Bock (2002), Elise Napier (2020–2021), Stephanie Southerland (2020)

Miss Achmetha (introduced 2000) is a green onion who made her first appearance singing the song "Lost Puppies" in "Esther... The Girl Who Became Queen". Miss Achmetha is known for her constantly twitching eye, her somewhat absentminded or annoyed demeanor, and her accordion playing. She also appears in both speaking and non-speaking parts in the Silly Songs, including "Sport Utility Vehicle" (which she sang alongside Larry), "Larry's High Silk Hat", and "Belly Button". After an eleven-year absence, Miss Achmetha returned for The VeggieTales Show, participating onstage in the shows put on in the theater.

=== Khalil ===
- Voiced by Tim Hodge (2002–2014), Todd Waterman (2021–2022)

Khalil (introduced 2002) is a caterpillar with an Indian accent who first appeared in Jonah: A VeggieTales Movie as a rug salesman and foil/conscience to Jonah (Archibald Asparagus). He corresponds to the caterpillar in the biblical book of Jonah that eats and withers Jonah's shade plant. In the film, Khalil claims that his mother was a caterpillar and that his father was a worm, explaining his peculiar physical appearance. He often claims his skills come from his heritage, such as "Insight runs very deep in my family." He was later heard as the voice of the sock puppet Lutfi, filling in for Larry on the countertop segments and telling the story of Saint Patrick in the style of a fanciful flannelgraph in the episode "Sumo of the Opera". In one of his few later appearances, he played a parody version of the Jiminy Cricket character in the video "Pistachio – The Little Boy That Woodn't". He also has a reoccurring role performing as a guest artist with Boyz in the Sink. Khalil returns in The VeggieTales Show, playing music from the orchestra pit as a one-man band.

=== Dr. Flurry ===
- Voiced by Mark Steele (2012), Joe Zieja (2020–2021)

Dr. Flurry (introduced 2012) is an eccentric gourd scientist who first appeared in "The League of Incredible Vegetables" as a villain trying to freeze others with their fears. He speaks with a German accent, has wild gray hair, a toothbrush mustache, and wears a lab coat. Eight years later, he appeared as a recurring character on The VeggieTales Show, acting much more amiably and providing fun inventions and contributing skits for the shows.

=== Ichabeezer ===
- Voiced by Rob Paulsen

Ichabeezer (introduced 2014) is the grumpy and rich zucchini neighbor of Bob and Larry in VeggieTales in the House. Ichabeezer is used in the spin-off series in essentially the same manner as Mr. Nezzer in the direct-to-video series as either the gruff antagonist or as the vaguely simple-minded authority figure in the stories. In the following series, VeggieTales in the City, Ichabeezer opens a fast-food restaurant called "Ichaburger", which becomes a recurring setting for the stories.

=== Bacon Bill ===
- Voiced by Rob Paulsen

Bacon Bill (introduced 2015) is an eccentric piece of bacon and a rocket scientist. He owns a shark rocket and is the grandson of an old friend of Pa Grape's. Bill sees Larry as "big brother" figure and the two eventually become very good friends. He only appears in VeggieTales in the House and VeggieTales in the City, leaving the house in the latter series to take over his grandfather's giant candy factory.

Bill is notable for being the first non-produce food character in the VeggieTales franchise.

=== Motato ===
- Voiced by Rob Paulsen

Motato (introduced 2015) is a deformed potato supervillain who is LarryBoy's arch-nemesis in VeggieTales in the House. He is quite eccentric and enjoys wreaking havoc and chaos on the Veggie citizens of the house. He is aided by his minions, the Radishes. Motato also owned a pet lobster named Clampy in the episode "Gone Lobster". In VeggieTales in the City, Motato eventually becomes a "good guy" at the end of the series after befriending Night Pony (Laura Carrot).

=== Callie Flower ===
- Voiced by Tress MacNeille (2015–2017), Stephanie Southerland (2020–2022)

Callie Flower (introduced 2015) is a young cauliflower who is friends with Junior and Laura. She first appeared in VeggieTales in the House in the aptly titled episode "Callie Flower". In the episode, Laura befriends Callie and learns how to be accepting of other people differences. Callie also struggles with a bully in the episode, Cornelius, who makes fun of her due to her interest in insects. Callie later appeared as a recurring character in The VeggieTales Show, starting with the episode, "A Lifetime Supply of Joy".

== Minor characters ==
=== Frankencelery ===
- Voiced by Phil Vischer

Frankencelery (introduced 1993) is a celery stalk who first appears in "Where's God When I'm S-Scared?" as the titular character of a Veggie horror TV show that scares Junior. Frankencelery later visits Junior and introduces himself as an actor named Phil Winklestein hailing from Toledo, Ohio. He reassures Junior that he is actually very amiable and only acting. Frankencelery resembles the classic Frankenstein's monster, with purple eyelids, a green nose, cervical bolts, black hair, and a unibrow (even outside his acting career). He has few other appearances throughout the original series, but appears in a barbershop quartet with the Scallions in the Silly Song "The Yodeling Veterinarian of the Alps", as well as new material created for the compilation videos "Larry Learns to Listen" and "Bob Lends a Helping Hand".

=== Art Bigotti ===
- Voiced by Mike Nawrocki

Art Bigotti (introduced 1997) is an asparagus bowling champion first mentioned in "Larry-Boy and the Fib from Outer Space!" where he is depicted on a bowling plate that Junior accidentally breaks. Art Bigotti's only physical appearance is a cameo waiting for the trolley in the Silly Song "Larry's High Silk Hat" from "Lyle the Kindly Viking". His last appearance outside of the series is in the computer game VeggieTales: Creativity City, where he speaks with a midwestern Chicago accent for the first and only time in the franchise.

=== Tom Grape ===
- Voiced by Phil Vischer

Tom Grape (introduced 1994) is Pa and Ma Grape's son and the brother of Rosie. He has a Southern accent, complemented by a large brimmed hat that has a piece of wheat sticking out of the hat. Like his father, Tom has no eyes to speak of. Tom made his first appearance in "God Wants Me to Forgive Them!?!" along with the rest of his family. His only other appearances have been in "Dave and the Giant Pickle" and "Josh and the Big Wall!", both times alongside Pa. Tom also appeared on the A Very Veggie Christmas album singing "Go Tell It on the Mountain" with his family and starred in his own picture book entitled "Time for Tom".

=== Lovey Asparagus ===
- Voiced by Gail Freeman-Bock

Lovey Asparagus (introduced 1994) is a British asparagus who first appeared as Archibald's wife in "Larry's Lagoon" as an allusion to Mr. and Mrs. Howell from Gilligan's Island. She next appeared as the Flibbian doctor in "The Story of Flibber-O-Loo". She later made a non-speaking cameo appearance in the sing-along video "The End of Silliness?". According to an archived version of the Big Idea website, since her role as the doctor in The Story of Flibber-o-Loo appealed to her so much, she enrolled in medical school and stopped appearing after her final appearance.

=== The Peach ===
- Voiced by Mike Nawrocki

The Peach (introduced 1995) is a monotone peach who first appears in the Silly Song "The Hairbrush Song". He appears to have no actual name, as he is only ever referred to as "the peach" by the other Veggie characters. He later appeared in the Silly Song "Oh, Santa!" where he played an IRS agent and continued to cameo in the background of various other episodes. There is a running joke about the Peach that he, unlike most of the other characters, has a full head of hair. Because of this, he is depicted in ancient art as Samson in "Minnesota Cuke and the Search for Samson's Hairbrush". His last appearance in the original series is a small role as a mall employee in "Merry Larry and the True Light of Christmas".

=== Mabel and Penelope ===
- Mabel: Voiced by Pamela Thomas
- Penelope: Voiced by Gail Freeman-Bock (2001–2002), Kay Sowell (2008)

Penelope (introduced 2001) are an asparagus and gourd duo, respectively. They first appeared as the wives to Mr. Nezzer and Jimmy Gourd's Viking characters in "Lyle the Kindly Viking" and later had small cameos in the film Jonah: A VeggieTales Movie. Penelope later appeared solo as Little Jimmy's Mama in "Tomato Sawyer and Huckleberry Larry's Big River Rescue" and went on to appear in the background of many future episodes.

=== Goliath ===
- Voiced by Phil Vischer

Goliath (introduced 1996) is a larger-than-life eight-foot pickle who first appeared as the biblical Goliath figure in "Dave and the Giant Pickle". He talks in a deep and toneless voice, often speaking in short sentences or phrases. Most of the other Veggie characters find him quite intimidating, but outside his acting roles, Goliath is more of a gentle giant in demeanor. He later made cameos in "Josh and the Big Wall!" and "Madame Blueberry". After a fifteen-year absence, Goliath made a special appearance in the compilation video "Little Ones Can Do Big Things Too" in some of the bridging segments on the kitchen countertop. After another seven-year absence, he appeared as a recurring character on The VeggieTales Show.

=== Apollo Gourd ===
- Voiced by Phil Vischer

Apollo Gourd (introduced 2001) is a massive yellow gourd who first appears in a non-speaking part in the Silly Song "Larry's High Silk Hat" in "Lyle the Kindly Viking". In the song, he wears a "Gourd's Gym" tank top, a parody of the then-popular "God's Gym" shirts (which were a parody of Gold's Gym). He later appeared as King Twistomer of Nineveh in Jonah: A VeggieTales Movie, a champion sumo wrestler in "Sumo of the Opera", and as Little Jimmy in "Tomato Sawyer and Huckleberry Larry's Big River Rescue".

=== Gourdon Smithson ===
- Voiced by Brian Roberts

Gourdon Smithson (introduced 2005) is a teenage yellow gourd who first appeared as the antagonist of the short "Bully Trouble" in "Minnesota Cuke and the Search for Samson's Hairbrush". He is characterized by his persistent selfishness and mean-spirited nature. He spends much of his time tormenting younger children and has a notable interest in video games. In his debut, he attempted to seize control of the playground and threatened Junior and his friends to never come back. However, Junior returns the next day to courageously confront him, asserting that physical intimidation will never truly defeat him. Gourdon would later appear as both Bobby Bernard and Chester in "The Wonderful Wizard of Ha's" and continued to appear in the background of later episodes.

=== Charlie Pincher ===
- Voiced by Tim Hodge (2002–2010), Mike Nawrocki (2006–2009; singing only)

Charlie Pincher (introduced 2002) is an old scallion who first appeared in "The Star of Christmas". He is scraggly in appearance, donning a five o'clock shadow with crooked stalks and a nose to match. Charlie often speaks in a cockney accent, but sometimes has a Southern accent, depending on the character he's playing. He is frequently cast as a hermit or an aloof character. His other notable appearances include "Lord of the Beans", "Moe and the Big Exit", "Abe and the Amazing Promise", "Pistachio – The Little Boy That Woodn't", and the short "Bob's Vacation" from the compilation DVD "God Made You Special." He also plays the innkeeper Jolly Joe in The Pirates Who Don't Do Anything feature film.

=== Ermie Asparagus ===
- Voiced by Megan Murphy Chambers

Ermie Asparagus (introduced 2012) is an energetic asparagus girl with her spear styled into pigtails. She debuted as Lenny LaBoe's younger sister in the opening story, "Lenny and the Lost Birthday" on "Robin Good and His Not-So-Merry Men". She is also seen as Ermengarde in "The Penniless Princess" and as Little Bo Peep in "The Good Egg of Gooseville" story of "The Little House That Stood". Despite being credited as Libby in "The Penniless Princess", her name was confirmed to be Ermie in the audio commentary for said episode.

=== Miss Minchin ===
- Voiced by Marin Miller (2012–2014), Stephanie Southerland (2020)

Miss Minchin (introduced 2012) is a middle-aged green onion who first appeared in The Penniless Princess as the strict headmistress of "The Minchin School for Lovely Little Ladies". This appearance established a stuffy and highbrow personality. Minchin would later go on to appear as a judge in "The Little House That Stood" from the episode of the same name and play famed travel critic Madame Chalot in "Beauty and the Beet". She also made a few cameos in The VeggieTales Show.

=== Rooney ===
- Voiced by Phil Vischer

Rooney (introduced 2014) is a Barouni olive dog and the prized pet of Ichabeezer in VeggieTales in the House and VeggieTales in the City. He is sweet but very rambunctious. Quite pampered by Ichabeezer, Rooney is often given lavish and expensive toys and treats.

=== Granny Asparagus ===
- Voiced by Phil Vischer

Granny Asparagus (introduced 2014) is Junior's elderly grandmother in VeggieTales in the House and VeggieTales in the City. She is a very stereotypical granny-type character, sometimes acting senile or being interested in things that are considered "old-fashioned". She also owns a pet "cherry cat" named Mrs. Fuzzyface, of which she used to fight crime with under the alter-ego "Asparajustice" when she was younger.

=== Tina Celerina ===
- Voiced by Tress MacNeille

Tina Celerina (introduced 2015) is an excitable celery stalk who is Petunia Rhubarb's best friend. She helps Petunia run her flower shop and often hangs out with Bob and Larry. To date, she has only appeared in VeggieTales in the House and VeggieTales in the City.

=== Adele Pepper ===
- Voiced by Melissa Mabie

Adele Pepper (introduced 2020) is an orange pepper and the "bad news" reporter for Bumblyburg's Channel 1 News, and later the Bumblyburg Inquisitor in The VeggieTales Show. She is known for reporting things in a negative light and sensationalizing her stories. She is seen on multiple billboards around town and makes two physical appearances in the episodes "LarryBoy and the Cape-Coat Caper" and "LarryBoy and the Menacing Mushroom".

Her character design is based on Mirabelle from the episode "Beauty and the Beet" from the original VeggieTales series.
