= Lists of American children's animated television episodes =

This is a list of lists of American children's animated television episodes.

== 0–9 ==
- List of The 7D episodes

== A ==
- List of Aaahh!!! Real Monsters episodes
- List of Action League Now! episodes
- List of Adventure Time episodes
- List of The Adventures of Jimmy Neutron, Boy Genius episodes
- List of The Adventures of Puss in Boots episodes
- List of Adventures of the Gummi Bears episodes
- List of Aladdin episodes
- List of All Grown Up! episodes
- List of All Hail King Julien episodes
- List of Alma's Way episodes
- List of Alvin and the Chipmunks (1983 TV series) episodes
- List of Alvinnn!!! and the Chipmunks episodes
- List of The Amazing World of Gumball episodes
- List of American Dragon: Jake Long episodes
- List of Amphibia episodes
- List of Angela Anaconda episodes
- List of The Angry Beavers episodes
- List of Animaniacs episodes
- List of Animaniacs (2020 TV series) episodes
- List of Apple & Onion episodes
- List of The Aquabats! Super Show! episodes
- List of Arthur episodes
- List of As Told by Ginger episodes
- List of Avatar: The Last Airbender episodes
- List of Avengers Assemble episodes
- List of The Avengers: Earth's Mightiest Heroes episodes

== B ==
- List of Baby Looney Tunes episodes
- List of Back at the Barnyard episodes
- List of The Backyardigans episodes
- List of Batman: The Animated Series episodes
- List of Batman Beyond episodes
- List of The Batman episodes
- List of Batman: The Brave and the Bold episodes
- List of Battle of the Planets episodes
- List of Beast Wars episodes
- List of Beetlejuice episodes
- List of Ben 10 (2005 TV series) episodes
- List of Ben 10 (2016 TV series) episodes
- List of Ben 10: Alien Force episodes
- List of Ben 10: Omniverse episodes
- List of Ben 10: Ultimate Alien episodes
- List of The Berenstain Bears (1985 TV series) episodes
- List of Between the Lions episodes
- List of Big City Greens episodes
- List of Big Hero 6: The Series episodes
- List of Biker Mice from Mars episodes
- List of Bionic Six episodes
- List of Blaze and the Monster Machines episodes
- List of Blue's Clues episodes
- List of Bobby's World episodes
- List of Bonkers episodes
- List of Boy Girl Dog Cat Mouse Cheese episodes
- List of Brandy & Mr. Whiskers episodes
- List of Breadwinners episodes
- List of Bubble Guppies episodes
- List of Bunnicula episodes
- List of Butterbean's Café episodes

== C ==
- List of Camp Lazlo episodes
- List of Captain N: The Game Master episodes
- List of Captain Planet episodes
- List of Care Bears episodes
- List of Cartoon Planet episodes
- List of The Casagrandes episodes
- List of The Cat in the Hat Knows a Lot About That! episodes
- List of CatDog episodes
- List of ChalkZone episodes
- List of Chaotic episodes
- List of Chip 'n Dale: Rescue Rangers episodes
- List of Chowder episodes
- List of Clarence episodes
- List of Clifford the Big Red Dog episodes
- List of Cloudy with a Chance of Meatballs episodes
- List of Cocomelon Lane episodes
- List of Codename: Kids Next Door episodes
- List of Conan the Adventurer episodes
- List of Courage the Cowardly Dog episodes
- List of Cow and Chicken episodes
- List of Craig of the Creek episodes
- List of The Cramp Twins episodes
- List of The Cuphead Show! episodes
- List of Curious George episodes
- List of Cyberchase episodes

== D ==
- List of Daniel Tiger's Neighborhood episodes
- List of Danny Phantom episodes
- List of Darkwing Duck episodes
- List of Dawn of the Croods episodes
- List of DC Super Hero Girls (TV series) episodes
- List of DC Super Hero Girls (web series) episodes
- List of Descendants: Wicked World episodes
- List of Dexter's Laboratory episodes
- List of Dinosaur Train episodes
- List of Dinotrux episodes
- List of Walt Disney anthology television series episodes (seasons 1–29)
- List of Walt Disney anthology television series episodes (seasons 30–present)
- List of Doc McStuffins episodes
- List of Dora and Friends: Into the City! episodes
- List of Dora the Explorer episodes
- List of Dorothy and the Wizard of Oz episodes
- List of Doug episodes
- List of The Dragon Prince episodes
- List of Dragon Tales episodes
- List of DreamWorks Dragons episodes
- List of DreamWorks Dragons: The Nine Realms episodes
- List of Duck Dodgers episodes
- List of DuckTales (1987 TV series) episodes
- List of DuckTales (2017 TV series) episodes

== E ==
- List of Ed, Edd n Eddy episodes
- List of Eek! The Cat episodes
- List of Elena of Avalor episodes
- List of Elinor Wonders Why episodes
- List of The Emperor's New School episodes
- List of The Epic Tales of Captain Underpants episodes
- List of Esme & Roy episodes
- List of Exosquad episodes

== F ==
- List of The Fairly OddParents episodes
- List of Fanboy & Chum Chum episodes
- List of Fancy Nancy episodes
- List of Fat Albert and the Cosby Kids episodes
- List of Fetch! with Ruff Ruffman episodes
- List of Fish Hooks episodes
- List of The Flintstones episodes
- List of Foster's Home for Imaginary Friends episodes
- List of Freakazoid! episodes

== G ==
- List of G.I. Joe: A Real American Hero episodes
- List of Garfield and Friends episodes
- List of The Garfield Show episodes
- List of Gargoyles episodes
- List of Generator Rex episodes
- List of George of the Jungle (2007 TV series) episodes
- List of Go, Diego, Go! episodes
- List of Goldie & Bear episodes
- List of Goof Troop episodes
- List of Gravity Falls episodes
- List of The Grim Adventures of Billy & Mandy episodes
- List of Guardians of the Galaxy episodes
- List of Gumby episodes

== H ==
- List of Hanazuki: Full of Treasures episodes
- List of Handy Manny episodes
- List of Harvey Beaks episodes
- List of He-Man and the Masters of the Universe (2002 TV series) episodes
- List of He-Man and the Masters of the Universe episodes
- List of Henry Hugglemonster episodes
- List of Hercules (1998 TV series) episodes
- List of Hero: 108 episodes
- List of Hey Arnold! episodes
- List of Hi Hi Puffy AmiYumi episodes
- List of The High Fructose Adventures of Annoying Orange episodes
- List of Home: Adventures with Tip & Oh episodes
- List of Hotel Transylvania: The Series episodes
- List of House of Mouse episodes
- List of The Huckleberry Hound Show episodes
- List of Hulk and the Agents of S.M.A.S.H. episodes

== I ==
- List of I Am Weasel episodes
- List of Infinity Train episodes
- List of Inspector Gadget (1983 TV series) episodes
- List of Invader Zim episodes
- List of Iron Man: Armored Adventures episodes

== J ==
- List of Jackie Chan Adventures episodes
- List of Jake and the Never Land Pirates episodes
- List of James Bond Jr. episodes
- List of Jay Jay the Jet Plane episodes
- List of Jellystone! episodes
- List of Jem episodes
- List of The Jetsons episodes
- List of Johnny Bravo episodes
- List of Johnny Test episodes
- List of Jumanji episodes
- List of Jurassic World Camp Cretaceous episodes
- List of Justice League episodes
- List of Justice League Unlimited episodes

== K ==
- List of KaBlam! episodes
- List of Kaijudo episodes
- List of Kick Buttowski: Suburban Daredevil episodes
- List of Kiff episodes
- List of Kim Possible episodes
- List of King Leonardo and His Short Subjects episodes
- List of Kung Fu Panda: Legends of Awesomeness episodes
- List of Kuu Kuu Harajuku episodes

== L ==
- List of Lalaloopsy episodes
- List of The Legend of Korra episodes
- List of Lilo & Stitch: The Series episodes
- List of The Lion Guard episodes
- List of Little Bear episodes
- List of Little Bill episodes
- List of Little Einsteins episodes
- List of Littlest Pet Shop episodes
- List of Looney Tunes Cartoons episodes
- List of The Looney Tunes Show episodes
- List of The Loud House episodes

== M ==
- List of Mad episodes
- List of The Magic School Bus episodes
- List of Mario television episodes
- List of Martha Speaks episodes
- List of The Marvelous Misadventures of Flapjack episodes
- List of Max Steel (2000 TV series) episodes
- List of Max Steel (2013 TV series) episodes
- List of Men in Black: The Series episodes
- List of Mickey Mouse episodes
- List of Mickey Mouse Clubhouse episodes
- List of Mickey Mouse Funhouse episodes
- List of Mickey Mouse Mixed-Up Adventures episodes
- List of The Mighty B! episodes
- List of Mighty Magiswords episodes
- List of Miles from Tomorrowland episodes
- List of Milo Murphy's Law episodes
- List of Mira, Royal Detective episodes
- List of The Mr. Peabody & Sherman Show episodes
- List of Monsuno episodes
- List of ¡Mucha Lucha! episodes
- List of Muppet Babies (1984 TV series) episodes
- List of Muppet Babies (2018 TV series) episodes
- List of My Friends Tigger & Pooh episodes
- List of My Gym Partner's a Monkey episodes
- List of My Life as a Teenage Robot episodes
- List of My Little Pony: Friendship Is Magic episodes
- List of My Little Pony: Pony Life episodes
- List of Mysticons episodes

== N ==
- List of Nature Cat episodes
- List of Nella the Princess Knight episodes
- List of The New Adventures of Winnie the Pooh episodes
- List of New Looney Tunes episodes
- List of NFL Rush Zone episodes
- List of Ni Hao, Kai-Lan episodes

== O ==
- List of Oh Yeah! Cartoons episodes
- List of OK K.O.! Let's Be Heroes episodes
- List of Olivia episodes
- List of The Owl House episodes

== P ==
- List of Pac-Man and the Ghostly Adventures episodes
- List of The Patrick Star Show episodes
- List of PB&J Otter episodes
- List of The Penguins of Madagascar episodes
- List of Penn Zero: Part-Time Hero episodes
- List of Pepper Ann episodes
- List of Phineas and Ferb episodes
- List of Pickle and Peanut episodes
- List of Pig Goat Banana Cricket episodes
- List of The Pink Panther cartoons
- List of Pinky and the Brain episodes
- List of Pinky Dinky Doo episodes
- List of Police Academy episodes
- List of Polly Pocket episodes
- List of Postcards from Buster episodes
- List of Pound Puppies (2010 TV series) episodes
- List of The Powerpuff Girls episodes
- List of The Powerpuff Girls (2016 TV series) episodes
- List of The Proud Family: Louder and Prouder episodes
- List of The Proud Family episodes
- List of A Pup Named Scooby-Doo episodes
- List of Puppy Dog Pals episodes

== Q ==
- List of The Quick Draw McGraw Show episodes

== R ==
- List of Rabbids Invasion episodes
- List of Randy Cunningham: 9th Grade Ninja episodes
- List of Rapunzel's Tangled Adventure episodes
- List of Ready Jet Go! episodes
- List of The Real Ghostbusters episodes
- List of Recess episodes
- List of Regular Show episodes
- List of The Ren & Stimpy Show episodes
- List of The Replacements episodes
- List of Robotech episodes
- List of Rocket Power episodes
- List of Rocko's Modern Life episodes
- List of Rocky and Bullwinkle episodes
- List of Rolie Polie Olie episodes
- List of The Ruff and Reddy Show episodes
- List of Rugrats episodes

== S ==
- List of Samurai Pizza Cats episodes
- List of Sanjay and Craig episodes
- List of Schoolhouse Rock! episodes
- List of Scooby-Doo! Mystery Incorporated episodes
- List of The Scooby-Doo Show episodes
- List of Scooby-Doo, Where Are You! episodes
- List of The Secret Saturdays episodes
- List of She-Ra and the Princesses of Power episodes
- List of She-Ra: Princess of Power episodes
- List of Sheriff Callie's Wild West episodes
- List of Shimmer and Shine episodes
- List of Sid the Science Kid episodes
- List of The Smurfs (1981 TV series) episodes
- List of The Snoopy Show episodes
- List of Snorks episodes
- List of Sofia the First episodes
- List of Sonic Boom episodes
- List of Space Racers episodes
- List of Special Agent Oso episodes
- List of The Spectacular Spider-Man episodes
- List of Speed Racer: The Next Generation episodes
- List of Spider-Man (1967 TV series) episodes
- List of Spider-Man: The Animated Series episodes
- List of Spider-Man (2017 TV series) episodes
- List of Spidey and His Amazing Friends episodes
- List of Spirit Riding Free episodes
- List of SpongeBob SquarePants episodes
- List of SpongeBob SquarePants episodes (seasons 1–10)
- List of SpongeBob SquarePants episodes (seasons 11–present)
- List of Star vs. the Forces of Evil episodes
- List of Star Wars Rebels episodes
- List of Star Wars: The Clone Wars episodes
- List of Star Wars: Young Jedi Adventures episodes
- List of Static Shock episodes
- List of Steven Universe episodes
- List of Strawberry Shortcake's Berry Bitty Adventures episodes
- List of Strawberry Shortcake (TV series) episodes
- List of Summer Camp Island episodes
- List of Sunny Day episodes
- List of The Super Hero Squad Show episodes
- Lists of Super Friends episodes
- List of Super Robot Monkey Team Hyperforce Go! episodes
- List of Super Why! episodes
- List of Super Wings episodes
- List of SuperKitties episodes
- List of Superman: The Animated Series episodes
- List of SWAT Kats: The Radical Squadron episodes
- List of The Sylvester & Tweety Mysteries episodes

== T ==
- List of T.O.T.S. episodes
- List of T.U.F.F. Puppy episodes
- List of TaleSpin episodes
- List of Talking Tom & Friends episodes
- List of Team Umizoomi episodes
- List of Teen Titans episodes
- List of Teen Titans Go! episodes
- List of Teenage Mutant Ninja Turtles (2003 TV series) episodes
- List of Teenage Mutant Ninja Turtles (2012 TV series) episodes
- List of Teenage Mutant Ninja Turtles (1987 TV series) episodes
- List of ThunderCats (1985 TV series) episodes
- List of Tig n' Seek episodes
- List of Timon & Pumbaa episodes
- List of Tiny Toon Adventures episodes
- List of The Tom and Jerry Show (2014 TV series) episodes
- List of Tom & Jerry Kids episodes
- List of Tom and Jerry Tales episodes
- List of Toon In with Me episodes
- List of Toon In with Me episodes (2021)
- List of Toon In with Me episodes (2022)
- List of Toon In with Me episodes (2023)
- List of Toon In with Me episodes (2024)
- List of Toon In with Me episodes (2025)
- List of Toon In with Me episodes (2026)
- List of Total DramaRama episodes
- List of Transformers: Animated episodes
- List of Transformers: Armada episodes
- List of Transformers: Cyberverse episodes
- List of The Transformers episodes
- List of Transformers: Prime episodes
- List of Transformers: Rescue Bots episodes
- List of Transformers: Robots in Disguise (2015 TV series) episodes
- List of Trolls: The Beat Goes On! episodes

== U ==
- List of Ultimate Spider-Man episodes
- List of Uncle Grandpa episodes

== V ==
- List of Valt the Wonder Deer episodes
- List of Vampirina episodes
- List of VeggieTales videos
- List of VeggieTales in the House episodes
- List of Victor and Valentino episodes
- List of Viva Piñata episodes
- List of Voltron episodes
- List of Voltron: Legendary Defender episodes

== W ==
- List of W.I.T.C.H. episodes
- List of Wacky Races (2017 TV series) episodes
- List of Wallykazam! episodes
- List of Wander Over Yonder episodes
- List of We Bare Bears episodes
- List of Welcome to the Wayne episodes
- List of What's New, Scooby-Doo? episodes
- List of What's with Andy? episodes
- List of Where on Earth Is Carmen Sandiego? episodes
- List of Wild Grinders episodes
- List of The Wild Thornberrys episodes
- List of Winx Club episodes
- List of Wonder Pets! episodes
- List of WordGirl episodes
- List of Wow! Wow! Wubbzy! episodes

== X ==
- List of X-Men: Evolution episodes
- List of X-Men: The Animated Series episodes
- List of Xavier Riddle and the Secret Museum episodes
- List of Xiaolin Showdown episodes

== Y ==
- List of X-Men: Evolution episodes
- List of X-Men: The Animated Series episodes
- List of Xavier Riddle and the Secret Museum episodes
- List of Xiaolin Showdown episodes
