= Xavier Riddle and the Secret Museum =

Animated children's television series on PBS Kids

- Genre: Children's television series; Preschool; Educational
- Created by: Brad Meltzer
- Based on: Ordinary People Change the World by Brad Meltzer
- Voices of: Aidan Vissers; Ian Ho; Zoe Hatz; Wyatt White; Logan Nicholson
- Theme music composer: Joseph Trapanese; Jason Lazarus; Lindsay Pitts
- Opening theme: "Xavier Riddle and the Secret Museum Theme"
- Ending theme: "Xavier Riddle and the Secret Museum Theme" (instrumental)
- Composer: Meiro Stamm
- Countries of origin: Canada; United States
- Original language: English
- No. of seasons: 2
- No. of episodes: 61 (list of episodes)

Production
- Executive producers: Brad Meltzer; Christopher Eliopoulos; Vince Commisso; Blake Tohana; Rob Weisbach; Fonda Snyder
- Producer: Jennifer Bradley
- Editors: Meghan Read; Tom Hastings
- Running time: 22 minutes (two 11-minute segments)
- Production companies: 9 Story Media Group (Note: As XR 1 Productions Inc (season 1) and XR 2 Productions Inc. (season 2)); Brown Bag Films

Original release
- Network: PBS Kids
- Release: November 11, 2019 – January 12, 2026

Xavier Riddle and the Secret Museum is an animated children's television series produced by 9 Story Media Group, based on Ordinary People Change the World, a children's book series written by Brad Meltzer and Chris Eliopoulos. It ran for two seasons from November 11, 2019 to January 12, 2026 on PBS Kids. The series follows young Xavier Riddle, his sister Yadina, their friend Brad, and their robotic companion Berby, who visit the Secret Museum to meet historical figures portrayed as children. Each episode introduces a historical hero, such as Rosa Parks or Leonardo da Vinci, who inspires the characters to overcome their own challenges. The show aims to teach young viewers important values such as courage, kindness, and perseverance through engaging storytelling and real-world role models.

== Premise ==
The series involves a Puerto Rican boy named Xavier Riddle, his sister Yadina Riddle (alongside her stuffed turtle Dr. Zoom) and their best friend Brad. In each episode, a problem or difficulty is encountered. They go to the Secret Museum to time travel to the past to observe, interact, and learn from the historical heroes. They then return to the present and use their experience to solve the problem.

== Characters ==
=== Main ===
- Xavier Riddle (voiced by Aidan Vissers in season 1 and Ian Ho in season 2) is the titular character and the leader of his group with his little sister Yadina and their friend Brad. He appears to be an excitable kid who is eager to go back in time and meet various historical figures.
- Yadina Riddle (voiced by Zoe Hatz) is Xavier's little sister, eager to explore the secret museum and learn about various historical figures.
- Brad Meltzer (voiced by Wyatt White in season 1–early season 2 and Logan Nicholson in late season 2) is a self insert of the writer of the same name, and is Xavier and Yadina's best friend. Throughout the series he shows an interest in superheroes, which is fitting as the real Brad Meltzer has written stories for The Justice League.

=== Supporting ===
- Berby is a small, egg-shaped flying robot who resides at the Secret Museum and functions as part of the time machine by transporting Xavier, Yadina, Dr. Zoom, and Brad back and forth in time.

== Production ==
Brad Meltzer wrote the book Ordinary People Change the World and began a series based on the book named the Ordinary People series in 2014 with I Am Abraham Lincoln, I Am Amelia Earhart, I Am Rosa Parks, and I Am Albert Einstein.

Literary Agent, Rob Weisbach brought the book series to Producer Fonda Snyder who developed the series bible with Brad Meltzer and sold it to Linda Simensky who was heading PBS. She brought it to Vince Commisso and Natalie Osborne at 9 Story Media Group to attach them to the project after it was set up with PBS. The series is produced by 9 Story Media Group's animation division, Brown Bag Films. 9 Story's Chief Creative Officer Angela Santomero states that Xavier Riddle lets kids know they have "the curiosity and adventurous spirit to change the world". Meltzer added to that statement: "When my own kids watch this series, I get to see them realize that there's extraordinary within the ordinary."

== Episodes ==
Season	Episodes	Originally released	
Season	Episodes	First released	Last released
1	37	November 11, 2019	January 31, 2022
2	24	January 15, 2024	January 12, 2026

== Broadcast ==
The series premiered on PBS Kids in the United States on November 12, 2019. It premiered on TVOKids in Canada on December 10, 2019. It airs on Super3, a Catalan-language children's channel in Spain. Season 2 was released on January 15, 2024.

Home Media

Meet Xavier March 17, 2020

1. I Am Johann Sebastian Bach

2. I Am Marie Curie

3. I Am Mary Shelley

4. I am Harry Houdini

5. I Am Helen Keller

6. I am Alexander Graham Bell

7. I am Florence Nightingale

8. I am George Washington Carver

9. I am Leonardo Da Vinci

10. I am Amelia Earhart

11. I Am Zora Neale Hurston

12. I am Charles Dickens

== Reception ==
=== Critical response ===
Joyce Slaton of Common Sense Media gave Xavier Riddle and the Secret Museum a mixed review. She stated that "the show makes many historical inaccuracies, which makes it odd for a TV show that wants to make history come back alive for kids." She also stated that "the show's tendency to play too fast and loose with the historical facts is confusing, and that 'Go for it!' is an unlikely motto for Amelia Earhart, who disappeared in 1937 and didn't complete her solo Atlantic flight as a grade school student, as Xavier depicts." George Washington Carver did have a secret garden as a child, in which he learned important lessons that impacted his career in botany. But, as Slaton states, "it's a real stretch to imagine him having to defend plants from renegade soccer players in 19th century Missouri", and that "the show seems to overlook his importance as an activist for ex-slaves and champion of sustainable agriculture, instead boiling his messages down to 'take care of plants and you'll take care of the earth.'"

=== Awards and nominations ===
Year	Award	Category	Nominee	Result	Ref.
2020	Annie Awards	Best Animated Television/Broadcast Production for Preschool Children	Xavier Riddle and the Secret Museum	Won	
2020	Daytime Emmy Awards	Outstanding Directing for a Preschool Animated Program	Cory Bobiak, Steven Boeckler and Susan Hart	Won	
2020	TCA Awards	Outstanding Achievement in Youth Programming	Xavier Riddle and the Secret Museum	Won	
2021	Annie Awards	Best Animated Television/Broadcast Production for Preschool Children	Xavier Riddle and the Secret Museum	Won	
2021	Daytime Emmy Awards	Outstanding Special Class Daytime Animated Program	Xavier Riddle and the Secret Museum: I Am Madam President	Won	
2021	Daytime Emmy Awards	Outstanding Directing Team for a Preschool Animated Program	Xavier Riddle and the Secret Museum [Won]style="background: #FFE3E3; color: black; vertical-align: middle; text-align: center; " class="no table-no2 notheme"|Nominated		
2021	TCA Awards	Outstanding Achievement in Youth Programming	Xavier Riddle and the Secret Museum	Nominated	
2022	Annie Awards	Best Animated Television/Broadcast Production for Preschool Children	Xavier Riddle and the Secret Museum	Nominated	
2022	Children's and Family Emmy Awards	Outstanding Preschool Animated Series	Xavier Riddle and the Secret Museum	Won	
2026	Annie Awards	Best Animated Television/Broadcast Production for Preschool Children	Xavier Riddle and the Secret Museum	Nominated	
