= List of The Quick Draw McGraw Show episodes =

The following is a list of episodes of The Quick Draw McGraw Show, an animated television series produced by Hanna-Barbera Productions. Each episode consists of a Quick Draw McGraw cartoon, an Augie Doggie and Doggie Daddy cartoon, and a Snooper and Blabber cartoon.

All episodes were written by Michael Maltese. In total, 45 episodes were produced and aired in first-run syndication across three seasons from September 28, 1959 to October 20, 1961.

== Series overview ==
Season	Segments	Episodes	Originally released	
Season	Segments	Episodes	First released	Last released
1	78	26	September 28, 1959	March 21, 1960
2	39	13	September 10, 1960	December 3, 1960
3	18	6	September 15, 1961	October 20, 1961

== Episodes ==
- Cartoons:
  - QDMG = Quick Draw McGraw
  - AD&DD = Augie Doggie and Doggie Daddy
  - S&B = Snooper and Blabber
- No. = Overall episode number
- Ep = Episode number by season

=== Season 1 (1959–60) ===
No. overall	No. in season	Cartoons: QDMG / AD&DD / S&B	Original release date
1	1	"Lamb Chopped / Million Dollar Robbery / Baby Rattled"	September 28, 1959
2	2	"Bad Guys’ Disguise / High and Flighty / Puss n’ Booty"	October 5, 1959
3	3	"Masking for Trouble / Nag-Nag-Nag / Switch Witch"	October 12, 1959
4	4	"Bow-Wow Bandit / Watch Dog Augie / Fee Fi Fo Fumble"	October 19, 1959
5	5	"Scat, Scout, Scat / Big Top Pop / Disappearing, Inc."	October 26, 1959
6	6	"Scary Prairie / In the Picnic of Time / Desperate Diamond Dimwits"	November 2, 1959
7	7	"El Kabong / Talk it Up Pup / Slippery Glass Slipper"	November 9, 1959
8	8	"Choo-Choo Chumps / Good Mouse Keeping / Big Diaper Caper"	November 16, 1959
9	9	"Riverboat Shuffled / Foxhound Hounded Fox / Masquerader Raider"	November 23, 1959
10	10	"Cattle Battle Rattled / Skunk You Very Much / Real Gone Ghosts"	November 30, 1959
11	11	"Double Barrel Double / Tee Vee or Not Tee Vee / The Flea and Me"	December 7, 1959
12	12	"Slick City Slicker / Pop’s Nature Pup / Not So Dummy"	December 14, 1959
13	13	"El Kabong Strikes Again / Whatever Goes Pup / Motor Knows Best"	December 21, 1959
14	14	"Six Gun Spook / Pup Plays Pop / Cloudy Rowdy"	December 28, 1959
15	15	"Sagebrush Brush / Cat Happy Pappy / Adventure is My Hobby"	January 4, 1960
16	16	"Gun Gone Goons / Pipsqueak Pop / Gopher Goofers"	January 11, 1960
17	17	"Dizzy Desperado / Fan Clubbed / Monkey Wrenched"	January 18, 1960
18	18	"Doggone Prairie Dog / Gone to the Ducks / Impossible Imposters"	January 25, 1960
19	19	"Treasure of El Kabong / Ro-Butler / Snap Happy Saps"	February 1, 1960
20	20	"Bronco Bustin’ Boobs / Mars Little Precious / The Case of the Purloined Parrot"	February 8, 1960
21	21	"Locomotive Loco / Crow Cronies / The Lion is Busy"	February 15, 1960
22	22	"Elephant Boy Oh Boy / Swat's the Matter / Doggone Dog Gone"	February 22, 1960
23	23	"The Lyin’ Lion / Fuss an’ Feathers / Laughing Guess"	February 29, 1960
24	24	"Bull Leave Me / Peck o’ Trouble / Poodle-Toodle-oo!"	March 7, 1960
25	25	"Kabong Kabong’s Kabong / Hum Sweet Hum / Hula-Hula Hullabaloo"	March 14, 1960
26	26	"Chopping Spree / Snagglepuss / Wild Man Wild!"	March 21, 1960

=== Season 2 (1960) ===
No. overall	No. in season	Cartoons: QDMG / AD&DD / S&B	Original release date
27	1	"El Kabong Meets El Kazing / Yuk-Yuk Duck / Ala-Kazoop!"	September 10, 1960
28	2	"Bullet Proof Galoot / It's a Mice Day / Hop to It"	September 17, 1960
29	3	"Two Too Much / Bud Brothers / Fleas Be Careful"	September 24, 1960
30	4	"Twin Troubles / Pint Giant / De-Duck-Tives"	October 1, 1960
31	5	"Ali-Baba Looey / It's a Worm Day / Big Shot Blab"	October 8, 1960
32	6	"Shooting Room Only / Patient Pop / Observant Servants"	October 15, 1960
33	7	"Yippee Coyote / The Musket-Tears / Scoop Snoop"	October 22, 1960
34	8	"Gun Shy Gal / Treasure Jest / Flea for All"	October 29, 1960
35	9	"Who Is El Kabong? / Little Wonder / Big Cat Caper"	November 5, 1960
36	10	"Scooter Rabbit / The Party Lion / Bear-ly Able"	November 12, 1960
37	11	"Talky Hawky / Horse Fathers / Surprised Party"	November 19, 1960
38	12	"Extra-Special Extra! / Let's Duck Out / Prince of a Fella"	November 26, 1960
39	13	"El Kabong, Jr. / Playmate Pup / Eenie, Genie, Minie, Mo!"	December 3, 1960

=== Season 3 (1961) ===
No. overall	No. in season	Cartoons: QDMG / AD&DD / S&B	Original release date
40	1	"El Kabong Was Wrong / Dough-Nutty / Gem Jams"	September 15, 1961
41	2	"Dynamite Fright / Growing, Growing, Gone / Outer Space Case"	September 22, 1961
42	3	"Baba Bait / Ape to Z / Zoom-Zoom Blabber"	September 29, 1961
43	4	"Big Town El Kabong / Hand to Mouse / Bronco Bluster"	October 6, 1961
44	5	"Mine Your Manners / Vacation Tripped / Person to Prison"	October 13, 1961
45	6	"The Mark of El Kabong / Party Pooper Pop / Chilly Chiller"	October 20, 1961
