= List of Transformers: Armada episodes =

Cover of the first DVD release of Transformers: Armada by Columbia Music Entertainment in Japan, containing the first four episodes

Transformers: Armada, known in Japan as Super Robot Life-Form Transformers: Legend of the Microns, is a Japanese anime series produced by animation studios Actas, Studio Galapagos, and NAS and consists of 52 episodes. The anime was a co-production between Takara and Hasbro and a reboot of the franchise, featuring new concepts. Despite being a Japanese production, the series premiered first in the United States. The series premiered on Cartoon Network on August 23, 2002, at 4 p.m. with a 90-minute movie special, consisting of the first three episodes. Following its premiere, new episodes started coming out on August 30, airing every Friday at 6:30 p.m. In the December issue of Japanese magazine Animage, it was announced that the anime would start airing in Japan on January 10, 2003, on TV Tokyo, with new episodes coming out every Friday at 6 p.m.

The anime focuses on the war between the Autobots and Decepticons, led by Optimus Prime and Megatron respectively.

Transformers: Armada is the first series in the "Unicron Trilogy", named so due to all three anime featuring Unicron as the main antagonist. Transformers: Energon, the second installment in the trilogy, is a direct sequel to Armada and takes places ten years after its conclusion. Transformers: Cybertron, the final installment, shares a thematic connection to the previous series and takes place in its own continuity. This was changed in the English dub which made explicit references to Armada and Energon.

== Episode list ==
No.	Title	Original release date
1	"First Encounter (Part 1 of 3)"; Transliteration: "Deai" (Japanese: 遭遇(であい))	August 23, 2002
The episode opens with a brief history of the Transformers War. In Lincoln, Nebraska, two teenagers, Rad and Carlos, heading out after school to check out a supposedly haunted cave. After traveling a while they step on a door that opens into a shaft and down they go. At the bottom they discover a glowing green stone. Rad bends down and touches it and the whole cave lights up and they feel an earthquake. The bright coloured rays burst out of the ground straight to the space. The boys' schoolmate, Alexis, feels anxiety for them and rushes in to seek them. Running outside the boys see a warp gate open with Megatron inside. Then Alexis shows up and Rad drops the plate which transforms into Mini-con High Wire who scans Rad's BMX bike and transforms into it. The kids try to escape on High Wire but Megatron blocks their path and demands them to give him back the Mini-con. Just in time Optimus Prime warps in to battle Megatron.
2	"Metamorphosis (Part 2 of 3)"; Transliteration: "Henshin" (Japanese: 擬態(へんしん))	August 23, 2002
The two robots battle it out for the Mini-Cons while the kids and High Wire decide to make their escape. As they try to outrun the two Decepticons, Demolisher and Starscream materialize in front of them, while on their other side the two Autobots, Red Alert and Hot Shot appear. The children are led back to the cave by High Wire and Optimus manages to hit Megatron hard enough to send the Decepticons into retreat. At the Moon base, Cyclonus takes snaps when the other 'Cons return empty-handed. He declares to Megatron that he can find the Mini-Cons and sets off at once to search. Back on Earth the kids find a passage to the Mini-Cons' ancient spaceship, where Carlos and Alexis awaken their own Mini-Cons. Carlos' Grindor turns into a skateboard while Alexis' Sureshock becomes an electric scooter. After a while they decide to take them out for a spin. On the Moon, Megatron finds his own old Mini-Con partner (named Leader-1) and demands why Cyclonus didn't see it. After giving him a lesson, he tells Leader-1 to show his power, and the Decepticons are astonished. Then Megatron demonstrates to his subordinates their new Earth vehicle modes. Starscream now can transform himself from robot to a supersonic jet-fighter, Demolisher can become a self-propelled gun, Cyclonus looks like a military helicopter. Megatron himself transforms into a tank. And now they leave for Earth. As the kids come over a rise they find Megatron and his guys. They try to run away, but the Decepticons encircle them. It seems to be no escape for them. Unexpectedly Optimus Prime drives up to them, knocks Megatron and Demolisher down and takes the children and the Mini-Cons away. He and the other Autobots are disguised as the Earth cars. They are ready to fight the Decepticons.
3	"Base (Part 3 of 3)"; Transliteration: "Tomodachi" (Japanese: 仲間(ともだち))	August 23, 2002
The Autobots and the Decepticons battle while the kids and the Mini-cons run for cover, only to nearly be buried in a landslide. Hot Shot and Red Alert save them. During the battle Alexis notices a strange sparkles in a cave on the mountainside. Everybody runs there. They find Mini-cons for Hot Shot and Red Alert and would've got more if it hadn't been for Cyclonus. Though the Decepticons have to retreat again, he gets a Mini-con panel and brings it to his chief. Megatron gives this Mini-con (whose name is Blackout) to Demolisher and says that every Decepticon must have his own Mini-con in order to defeat the Autobots finally. Later, at the crashed ship, the kids ask Optimus Prime why the Autobots are at war with the Decepticons and why all of them want to capture the Mini-cons. Optimus Prime explains that the Decepticons strive for Universal domination and treat the Mini-cons as their slaves, and the Autobots want the Universe (and the Mini-cons too, of course) to live in peace and freedom. Then Rad, Carlos and Alexis introduce themselves to the Autobots and promise to do whatever they can to help. The episode ends with everyone rushing to the control room and Rad comments on all the Mini-cons coming online.
4	"Comrade"; Transliteration: "Shinka" (Japanese: 合体(しんか))	September 20, 2002
This episode picks up where the last one left off. The Autobots are about to head out to find a Mini-con, when the kids come and beg to go with them. They are given special suits to help protect them, climb into Optimus's cab, and get their first taste of 'warping'. They arrive in the Grand Canyon where they are supposed to find a Mini-con. Here the team splits up into three groups in order to broaden the area of the quest. Carlos goes off with Red Alert, Optimus Prime stays with the Mini-cons, Rad and Alexis become the passengers of Hot Shot. Little flying robot Lazerbeak discovers a Mini-con panel in the rock, but before the 'Bots have time to take it, the 'Cons attack them in their usual way named "divide and conquer". Demolisher pursues Red Alert, Cyclonus chases Hot Shot and succeeds in making him trapped among the stones. Optimus Prime meets face to face with Megatron himself. Thanks to his Mini-con partner Megatron gains the upper hand and wounds Prime. Just as he is about to finish the Autobots' leader, Starscream (who had got an order to stay at the Base) suddenly appears. He declares himself to be mighty enough to destroy Prime. The kids are horrified because Optimus seems to be doomed. But then High Wire, Sureshock and Grindor unite and form a new strong and rapid robot named Perceptor. He strikes Megatron and Starscream and defends Optimus Prime till the new Mini-con awakes. This Mini-con turns out to be Optimus' old partner, Sparkplug (erroneously called Leader-1). He unites with Optimus and gives him the strength to attack both Megatron and Starscream and send them packing. Megatron is forced to retreat to the Decepticon Base. He is in great fury. By his order Starscream gets a severe chastisement for his disobedience.
5	"Soldier"; Transliteration: "Senshi" (Japanese: 武人(せんし))	September 27, 2002
Hot Shot and Red Alert are having a disagreement about their battle techniques as well as about their style of life. Red Alert asks Hot Shot to help him in his never-ending housekeeping job on the Autobots' base, but Hot Shot likes more to play with the kids than to work. Optimus Prime tells him that Red Alert was a brave soldier while on Cybertron and that his cares are quite necessary for every member of the Autobots' team, but Hot Shot seems to be not convinced of this. Soon, however, the conversation ceases because a new Mini-Con signal is detected in Antarctica. All the Autobots and their children partners set off there. But so do the Decepticons, too. Megatron sends his soldiers to seek a Mini-Con. Starscream is the first to see the Mini-Con panel while flying along the rift in the glacier. He wants to take the Mini-Con himself for he has no Mini-Con partner yet. When he notices Hot Shot (with Carlos in his cab) coming nearby, he attacks him. But Hot Shot knockes him off so that Starscream is heavily damaged. Megatron, Demolisher and Cyclonus appear in this moment. They mock at Starscream and attack Hot Shot themselves. Megatron succeeds in catching Hot Shot, but Red Alert saves Hot Shot's life by a power ring which he ejects from his chest. This ring hits Megatron and forces him to release Hot Shot. Meanwhile, Starscream recovers and tries to break the ice wall of the rift and to take the Mini-Con. Red Alert, however, prevents him to do this, so that the Autobots get this Mini-Con too and return to their Base victoriously. Rad is glad that Red Alert and Hot Shot are good friends again and are working as one team now.
6	"Jungle"; Transliteration: "Mamori" (Japanese: 保護(まもり))	October 4, 2002
This episode begins with the firing of the Autobots and the Decepticons. The Decepticons are actually battling a simulation of sheer holograms. Starscream orders Demolisher and Cyclonus to attack the Autobots from the flanks; then he transforms and attacks them from the air. But Optimus Prime shoots him down and prepares to make the final 'control shot' right to his forehead. However, Megatron is very angry with his warriors and especially with Starscream. Starscream promises Megatron to fight more effectively if he gives him a Mini-Con. Just in this time a signal of a Mini-Con is detected. The Autobots receive it too. This Mini-con is somewhere in a large forest. It is hard for the Autobots to drive here, and Hot Shot wants to cut a passage through a wood, but Rad asks him to spare the trees because it is necessary to protect nature. Optimus Prime agrees with Rad. Suddenly the Autobots face with the Decepticons, and a new battle begins. Starscream wants to attack the Autobots from the air, but Cyclonus is on his way, and Starscream's shot misses the target and sets the wood on fire. The Autobots together with the kids and the Mini-cons do their best to put out the fire. Meanwhile, Demolishor finds the Mini-Con on the top of the huge old tree. Starscream begs Megatron to give this Mini-Con to him, but Megatron denies his request (really, he doesn't want Starscream to have any Mini-Con). Starscream doesn't dare to argue further, but he has something in mind. Soon the Autobots return and the battle resumes. Accidentally Starscream has no enemy to fight. He catches the moment to get the Mini-Con. He is extremely happy to have a Mini-Con partner at last and names him Swindle. Now Starscream decides to demonstrate his new extraordinary power to everybody. He almost destroys both the Autobots and Decepticons by a single fire of his plasma gun. None-too-pleased Megatron orders the Decepticons to retreat. Before following his chief Starscream warns the Autobots that since now they must not to take their eyes off him. Optimus Prime considers that he is right. At the end of the episode the Decepticons have a battle practice again. But now Starscream alone destroys all the 'enemies' easily. He begins to wonder if he is stronger than Megatron when it comes to being leader. But Megatron has quite opposite point of view on this question.
7	"Carnival"; Transliteration: "Ōsawagi" (Japanese: 祝祭(おおさわぎ))	October 11, 2002
Rad and Carlos decide to take Highwire and Grindor, (mistakenly identified as Sureshock) to the town carnival. Then the rest of the Mini-cons show up, Sparkplug, Jolt, and Longarm, all in their natural forms, attracting the attention everyone there, particularly that of Fred and Billy. Billy sees Highwire and Grindor transform and hatch a plan to catch the Mini-cons. A chase ensues with the 'Bots wrecking the fair. Hot Shot arrives and saves Billy and Fred when his Mini-con Jolt carries them to the top of a balloon. He uses an air cannon to pop the balloon and catches them. He retreats back to base with all Minicons in tow while Billy and Fred promise never to reveal what they saw.
8	"Palace"; Transliteration: "Takara" (Japanese: 神殿(たから))	October 18, 2002
The new stage of the Mini-con hunting opens when Optimus Prime and his team arrive in the Sahara Desert to search for the next Mini-con location. Demolisher lays an ambush there and shells the Autobots. The children set off to clear the matter up. Unexpectedly a sand slide begins. Both the children and Demolisher fall down a mysterious ancient underground palace. There is a picture of a Mini-con on the wall. Rad, Carlos and Alexis discuss this fact: It was told that a tribe woman found the Mini-con centuries ago knowing it was special. Suddenly they find themselves surrounded by terrible metal spider-like creatures, but Demolisher (unwillingly, of course) saves them. While the ′Con deals with the metal spiders, the kids go farther and get into a splendid and stately throne room with a Mini-con panel lying on the throne. Soon Demolisher goes there, too, and sees the Mini-con. But when he tries to catch it, the palace begins to collapse... They all have a miraculous escape... just to find themselves in the thick of the next battle of the Autobots and the Decepticons. Later, after the battle, Megatron demands Demolisher to give the new Mini-con to him. Demolisher attempts to object to his master, but Megatron forces him to obey very soon. Starscream witnesses the scene; though he is not a friend of Demolisher, he understands that Megatron treats him unjustly.
9	"Confrontation"; Transliteration: "Wana" (Japanese: 廃墟(わな))	October 25, 2002
Billy and Fred are kidnapped by Cyclonus and when the Autobots try to rescue them Megatron captures all the kids and holds them for ransom. Megatron was thinking keeping the children as pets. The Autobots were going to send their Mini-cons to the Decepticons, Megatron needs those humans for the future.
10	"Underground"; Transliteration: "Chika" (Japanese: 迷路(ちか))	November 1, 2002
A new Mini-con appears and the Autobots and Decepticons go after it. The signal comes from a large city. In order to obtain the new Mini-con the two races will have to go underground. The Decepticons send their Minis to investigate the tunnels. The kids together with their Mini-cons do the same. During their quest they get into a derelict subway station. Here they find a Mini-con panel which is walled up in the ceiling (meanwhile somebody watches them). They succeed in pulling the panel out and decide to return to the 'Bots as soon as possible. While going through a tunnel the kids spot somebody (seemingly a 'Con) chasing them. They run away but are faced with the Decepticons' Minis. The kids seek safety in flight again. Now they are in a strange natural tunnel. Rad sends Lazerbeak to Optimus Prime for help. However, the Decepticons find their shelter well before the Autobots have time to get there. Suddenly an unknown Transformer comes to children's aid and fights the Decepticons. Just in this time the tunnel collapses and buries both the kids, the Minis and their defender. When Optimus Prime and his guys come at last it seems to them that it's all over. Cyclonus takes the new Mini-con, and the 'Cons warp out. But it appears very soon that everybody is alive. The mysterious Transformer turns out to be an Autobot warrior named Smokescreen. All the 'Bots are happy to see their old chap again.
11	"Ruin"; Transliteration: "Miyako" (Japanese: 記憶(みやこ))	November 15, 2002
The Autobots receive a new strange signal. It is a picture of a beautiful blonde girl. Carlos is charmed by her. He is sure that she is in danger and demands his friends to leave for rescuing her. But the signal appears to be received from under the Ocean. Red Alert explains that it is a Mini-con signal in reality, but Carlos doesn't believe to him. The Autobots submerge to the Ocean depth (with Rad, Alexis and Carlos in Optimus Prime's cab). There they see the ruins of an ancient town (Rad thinks that it is Atlantis). While they drift under the sea the Decepticons attack them. The Optimus' cab is damaged and the children almost sink. But Optimus Prime, with the aid of his comrades, succeeds in breaking through the gate of a central tower, where he finds a kind of an air bell so that the kids can breathe well again. Optimus then returns to his guys who fight the 'Cons. While the robots face off, the kids find a hologram of the girl. She tells them about the three Mini-cons which her people had uncover at one time. They could form a mighty sword named Star Saber that resulted the ruined country as its people fought to gain possession over it. She begs them never to wake these Mini-cons and use the Star Saber. But at this time Megatron breaks through a wall and gets the Mini-con (it proves to be one of the "Air Defense Team"). Now the tower is completely demolished together with all the remains of the ancient civilization. The Autobots and their children partners return to the Base. But Carlos is upset very much because he knows now that the blonde beauty is only a hologram, and Rad comforts him.
12	"Prehistory"; Transliteration: "Ikisatsu" (Japanese: 理由(いきさつ))	November 22, 2002
At the Autobot base, Rad had figured out how the people who had the Star Saber destroyed themselves. Meanwhile, Megatron is infuriated that the Mini-con panel he caught would not activate. He tried once more but did not succeed. Rad asks Optimus how to end the transformers war. Optimus explains that though both Decepticons and Autobots are the same, the Decepticons desire to rule the universe. They created an army to begin conquest of Cybertron but their progress was halted by the Autobots who sprang into action. After years of fighting, both sides ruled one half of the planet. Then, the Mini-cons came in. No one knew how they were created but they were used as power sources. Eventually, the Mini-cons wanted to leave, something the Autobots agreed on. They protected the ship holding the Mini-cons. As they escaped, the Mini-cons went into stasis in the form of panels. Through use of a diversion, the Mini-cons made it to Earth 4 million years ago. Optimus says it might be luck or destiny that the kids found High Wire in the first place. It is what drew the Autobots and Decepticons to Earth. Suddenly, the base's alarms find another Mini-con using Laserbeak. They travel to the remains of an amusement park on a remote island and began searching. They are then ambushed. While the two sides fought, the kids went searching for the Mini-con. The other Mini-cons fought against the Decepticons while the kids locate the Mini-con. Suddenly, the volcano erupts, burying Optimus. While Hot Shot got the kids to safety, Smokescreen digs a trench to move the lava. Just as Megatron got the panel, Optimus came in. Cyclonus got the panel but is barraged by the Street Action team. With the panel safe in Autobot hands, the Decepticons retreat. Later at headquarters, Red Alert theorizes that the Mini-cons are trying to achieve peace in the universe. At Decepticon headquarters, Megatron succeeds in activating the Mini-con panel and orders the reawakened Mini-con named Sonar to lead him to the others.
13	"Swoop"; Transliteration: "Tsurugi" (Japanese: 聖剣(つるぎ))	November 29, 2002
Cyclonus was sweeping the area for the Autobot base. Megatron is certain of it because of Sonar, the awakened Mini-con has confirmed. Finally, Cyclonus finds the base. At that moment, Rad, Alexis and Carlos are showing Billy and Fred the base. Suddenly, the alarms go off. Unaware of where everyone was, Fred and Billy aimlessly go off. Just then, the Decepticons warp in. They are attacked by the A-Base's defense system. However, the Autobots had to shut off because Fred and Billy are caught in the crossfire. Seeing Sonar, the Autobots formulate a plan. Hot Shot, however, goes off recklessly. The kids go off to save Billy and Fred, disobeying Optimus' orders. Hot Shot faces off against Megatron but gets rescued by Optimus while Smokescreen goes good to his namesake. After closing a blast door, Optimus gives the inactive Mini-cons to Hot Shot. Demolisher is lassoed by Smokescreen while Starscream is played by Red Alert who is just using a decoy panel to trap the Decepticon. The kids find Billy and Fred but are also found by Cyclonus. They lure him to the transportation room where Rad sends Cyclonus to a snowy mountain. Hot Shot lures Megatron into an electrical trap but he breaks free and has Sonar awaken his brethren, forming the Star Saber. Optimus manages to blast it out of Megatron's hands and it lands in Hot Shot's hands. Hot Shot recklessly charged into the fold but is thrown back by a barrage from Megatron. Rad tells Hot Shot to believe in the power of the Mini-cons. Through luck, Hot Shot succeeded in maiming the Decepticon leader, forcing all the Decepticons to retreat. Optimus grants Hot Shot the Star Saber. Megatron, repaired, is furious and vows to get revenge.
14	"Overmatch"; Transliteration: "Tsuwamono" (Japanese: 強敵(つわもの))	December 13, 2002
Demolisher, Starscream and Cyclonus search for a Mini-con panel among the high rocks. While Starscream tries to get it, Hot Shot appears, armed with the Star Saber. He attacks the 'Cons and wounds them all. The Decepticons are forced to warp out. Hot Shot is proud of his victory very much. Optimus Prime warns him that it is no time to relax yet, but Hot Shot declares overconfidently that the Star Saber will soon put an end to the war. In the Decepticon headquarters everyone is in low spirits. Megatron states that it is necessary to warp in to the A-Base again and to seize the Star Saber, but Demolisher objects against this plan because it is mortally dangerous. Starscream says nothing, for he is too busy with the repairing his own hand. Unexpectedly an unknown Transformer makes his appearance. His name is Scavenger, and he is an over-mighty and skilful warrior. Megatron invites Scavenger to join up with his group and promises to reward him handsomely if he helps him to obtain the Star Saber. The other 'Cons are dissatisfied with Megatron's new «happy find». Starscream is especially discontented. He considers himself humiliated by Scavenger who refused to fight him because of his sore hand. But the Decepticons have to obey to their Lord, after all. The next scene takes place on the Earth where the Autobots and Decepticons close for fighting. Scavenger watches the happening. Hot Shot is armed with the Star Saber, as usual. He brings down Cyclonus with one stroke, and Demolisher doesn't dare to attack him at all. Then Starscream challenges Hot Shot to a duel. Scavenger observes that it will be a fine performance. Starscream succeeds in wounding Hot Shot in the face, but the 'Bot cuts his wing-sword in two by the Star Saber. Starscream yells that the duel is not over yet. But Scavenger prevents them to go on with fighting. He says that Hot Shot's victory is that of the Star Saber only. Hot Shot is beside himself with rage. He attacks Scavenger but that one beats off his attack easily, so that the 'Bot drops the Star Saber. Megatron rushes in to seize the weapon but Optimus Prime is on his way. Just in this moment Cyclonus reports to Megatron that he had found a new Mini-con. The Decepticon leader finds it a suitable pretext for the warping out. On the D-Base Scavenger informs the Decepticons that the Mini-con they've just found is part of the Skyboom Shield that can block the Star Saber.
15	"Gale"; Transliteration: "Hayate" (Japanese: 疾風(はやて))	December 20, 2002
Hot Shot is extremely proud of his new victory over the 'Cons. The kids admire him so that he is ready to believe himself to be the most powerful Autobot in the Universe. The new Mini-con is located in a road tunnel. All the Autobots head out to find it. The boys beg Hot Shot to take them along. He agrees and jokes that they will give him a moral support. While the 'Bots drive to the tunnel the Decepticons are on the spot already. Scavenger tries to get the Mini, Megatron and Starscream watch him working. Demolisher and Cyclonus are on duty near the tunnel entrance. When they see the 'Bots coming Cyclonus cripples a track on the highway and makes a jam. The Autobots are forced to stop. At this moment a new character appears on the scene. This is a motorcycle Transformer. He seems to side with the Autobots because he hinders Cyclonus to fire Hot Shot in the back. Then he watches Hot Shot and Scavenger engaging in battle with each other. Hot Shot wins the duel apparently but Scavenger before going away asks him derisively if he is worth something without the Star Saber. Hot Shot wants to blow off at a mysterious motor-cyclist but hears from him that he's on his side. Meanwhile the Autobots force the Decepticons to retreat again and get the Mini-con. Optimus Prime thanks the motor-transformer for his help and asks his name. The new acquaintance tells them that back on Cybertron they call him Sideways and he is a tramp. Then the Autobot emblem appears on his breast. So Sideways becomes a member of the team, but he doesn't have Rad and Alexis convinced that he's for the Autobots only.
16	"Credulous"; Transliteration: "Ogori" (Japanese: 慢心(おごり))	December 27, 2002
Hot Shot and Sideways are the best friends now. Sideways incites Hot Shot to rout the 'Cons on their own Base on the Moon and promises that he will get a chance to do this quite soon. And, unfortunately for Hot Shot, he proves to be right. The Autobots and Decepticons fight for a new Mini-con. Megatron and his soldiers retreat. Hot Shot and Sideways pursue them and overtake them in a canyon. They attack Megatron. By accident, they both are warped back to the D-Base with him. A short time after the Autobots hear about it. The boys are fully confident that Hot Shot will win again easily, but in reality everything is quite not so simple. The 'Cons succeed in entraping the 'Bots, and Sideways is captured by Megatron. The Lord of the Decepticons demands Hot Shot to give him the Star Saber in exchange for Sideways' life. Hot Shot readily sacrifices his formidable weapon to save his friend. But when he understands that Megatron has no intention to spare them, he summons the Air Defense Team to his aid. Starscream, being possessed by the wish to receive the Star Saber, rushes in to fight Hot Shot. He is a grave adversary but Hot Shot succeeds in disarming him. Just in this moment Sideways disarmes Hot Shot himself and reveals his allegiance to the Decepticons. Hot Shot is in despair and curses his own credulity, but it is too late. Megatron orders to his guys to give the 'Bot the "warmest reception". However, Scavenger doesn't allow the 'Cons to kill Hot Shot so that he returns to the A-Base alive at last. But the Star Saber is now in Starscream's hands. The conceited "jet" considers himself the mightiest Decepticon in the Universe now.
17	"Conspiracy"; Transliteration: "Inbō" (Japanese: 策略(いんぼう))	January 10, 2003
The Autobots lose one battle after the other since the Decepticons possess the Star Saber. Hot Shot is very sad because of the treason of Sideways and the loss of the wonderful weapon. The kids try to cheer him up, and they succeed in doing this at last. Also he is bursting with a desire to avenge himself on Sideways and Scavenger whom he considers his worst enemies. The Decepticons have their own problems, too. Megatron strives for obtaining the Star Saber. But even he doesn't dare to take it away from Starscream by force. So he invents a plan how to seize the Star Saber by trickery. One day both the Autobots and Decepticons head out to find a new Mini-con. It is located in a foggy woodland. All the «Mini-Con hunters» wander over the whole forest. Nobody sees each other till runs into him face to face. It plays into Megatron's hand, and he begins to carry out his plan. Starscream stomps through the wood with the Air Defense Team accompanying him and dreams if he becomes a new mighty leader of the Decepticons. Somebody fires on him. He rushes in to destroy the unknown enemy with the Star Saber in his hand and suddenly comes across Demolisher and Megatron. Megatron seems to be seriously wounded. Starscream tries to explain them that he pursued an enemy firing on him but nobody believes him. The 'Cons accuse Starscream of attacking his own comrades and demand him to give the Star Saber to Megatron. Starscream is forced to obey them because there's no alternative for him. So Megatron gets the Star Saber at last. Only Scavenger understands that it was a put-up job of Megatron himself and his Mini-con partner. As for Hot Shot, he comes across Sideways in the forest. While pursuing him the young 'Bot runs into Scavenger and challenges him to fighting. But Scavenger repels his attacks easily and tells that Hot Shot needs to perceive himself before to defeat the enemy. Then he goes away. Hot Shot follows his advice and succeeds in winning a victory over Sideways. Meanwhile, the Decepticons with the aid of Scavenger get the second Mini-Con for the Skyboom Shield. After that Scavenger leaves the D-Base and heads to the Autobot base where Optimus reveals he was spying on the Decepticons and means no harm.
18	"Trust"; Transliteration: "Kizuna" (Japanese: 戦友(きずな))	January 17, 2003
The Autobots, being learned from their recent bitter experience, are not very friendly disposed towards Scavenger. Smokeskreen considers him a traitor and even doesn't disguise his feelings. So do the kids too, especially Carlos. The Decepticons, in their turn, hope that Scavenger will spy on the Autobots. Scavenger is training Hot Shot when the alarm sounds for a new Mini-con which is located somewhere in the snow-covered mountains. All the 'Bots arrive there and see the Decepticons waiting for them. A battle ensues. Megatron and Optimus Prime start a hand-to-hand fight. While battling they are nearing the brink of a precipice. The Autobots call Scavenger for help, but he disappears, and nobody knows where he is. Smokescreen swears he's abandoned them, but Hot Shot refuses to believe in this because Scavenger is his teacher. The children watch the battle on the monitor in the Autobot headquarters. Suddenly they notice Scavenger on the opposite side of the gulf. Carlos expresses his misgivings that this position is the best for a treacherous blow. Meanwhile both Megatron and Optimus Prime fall in the precipice. Then Scavenger shows up to save Optimus Prime, whereas Megatron falls at the bottom of the gulf. He is alive but heavily damaged. Red Alert tells to the kids that Optimus and Scavenger are old friends and that Scavenger is the most reliable of the Autobots. Smokescreen begs Scavenger's pardon for thinking badly about him. Sideways drags Megatron out of the gulf. The Lord of the Decepticons vows to return and to take revenge on Optimus Prime.
19	"Vacation"; Transliteration: "Honeyasume" (Japanese: 休日(ほねやすめ))	January 22, 2003
Rad, Carlos, Billy and Fred take Smokescreen, Red Alert and the Mini-cons to a vacation site. But they forget to invite Alexis to this tour, and she is offended with them very much. The boys and robots have a good time on the bank of a mountain river. They play in a water with their new little friend whose name is Shawn. But soon the river floodes on account of the heavy shower. The landslide begins and buries Red Alert together with Carlos and Shawn. Smokescreen does his best to dig them out. Optimus Prime, Scavenger and Hot Shot rush to his help through the warp gate. They succeed in saving Red Alert and the boys. All the company returns to the A-Base. Well, their vacation turned out to be anything that but restful! But Alexis isn't angry with her friends already. She is very glad to see them all again. Afterward Kelly a reporter and her cameraman try to review footage of the Autobots but got damage thanks to Laserbeak.
20	"Reinforcement"; Transliteration: "Arate" (Japanese: 援軍(あらて))	January 23, 2003
As the two sides fight for the latest Mini-con, Autobot Blurr arrives and claims the Mini-con for his own by shooting it out of Demolisher's hands. He turns out to be a real snob and quickly he and Hot Shot get off to a bad start. The third Mini-con of the Skyboom Shield, being Downshift, activates in a land-crack raceway and searches for his mates. Blurr and Hot Shot are both sent to get it but lose it to the Decepticons due to tension between the two. In the end though they gain a friendship.
21	"Decisive Battle"; Transliteration: "Kizashi" (Japanese: 前兆(きざし))	January 24, 2003
Megatron stops a meteor with the Skyboom Shield, then challenges the Autobots to a battle. Optimus Prime ends up face to face with the Star Saber, but Sparkplug uses the Skyboom shield to save him.
22	"Vow"; Transliteration: "Fureai" (Japanese: 伝心(ふれあい))	January 27, 2003
This episode starts with recap of the previous battle; Optimus Prime and Sparkplug are saved by the Skyboom Shield. Next, Hot Shot and Blurr are denying the kids access to the base, telling them that until they learn about the power of the Skyboom Shield the kids should stay away for their own safety. The Street-Action Mini-con team gets the same response. On their way home, SureShock intercepts a message from the Decepticon Mini-cons, asking for peace. Rad and Fred race back to tell the Autobots while the others head out, only to find that the information is less than welcome. The Decepticons are behind the whole set up, hoping to use a series of warp gates to get Prime on his own. When the team arrives at the meeting spot, they see a brief view of the Mini-cons before they disappear. Fred and Rad rush in only to get warped themselves, along with a few of the 'Bots. Eventually, though, it's only them and Optimus, who in between warps tells them that the Mini-cons look up to Megatron, like a father figure. At the last warp, they meet Megatron who orders his Minis' to attack. The boys manage to convince Optimus that it's only because of Megatron that they attack, so he doesn't return fire. In the end, the Mini-cons defy Megatron to save Optimus, proving that they just want peace.
23	"Rebellion"; Transliteration: "Kakugo" (Japanese: 謀反(かくご))	January 28, 2003
Megatron is in the great fury about the loss of their last battle. He wishes to wreak his anger on somebody, and Starscream runs into a squall. Megatron gives the airborne Decepticon a good thrashing and almost kills him, but Demolisher smashes through the door of the misused storage room and appears just in time to stop Megatron and to stand up for Starscream. Feeling cruelly and undeservedly humiliated, Starscream then challenges his leader to a duel for command over the Decepticons after Sideways had lied to manipulate both of them. Megatron wins, but decides to spare Starscream's life. Sideways views this as a huge weakness to be exploited. This is the first episode not to feature either the Autobots or the kids.
24	"Chase"; Transliteration: "Kage" (Japanese: 幻影(かげ))	January 29, 2003
The episode begins with Carlos and Rad talking to Alexis when her laptop is infected with a virus by Sideways. All three of them try to terminate him and end up getting sucked into cyber-space. While drifting through the holograms of planets they are pulled toward a hologram of Cybertron. Sideways appears and kidnaps Sureshock. Alexis then finds out Sideways didn't create the cyber world they're in and his attacks are rendered useless. Sideways begins apologizing to what appears to be an evil force even stronger than Megatron. They escape while being chased by a jawed planet with two horns and rings.
25	"Tactician"; Transliteration: "Chiemono" (Japanese: 軍師(ちえもの))	January 30, 2003
After the failure of just another attempt to get a Mini-con, the Decepticons quarrel with each other when finding out whose fault it is. Suddenly somebody invisible meddles in their squabble. The 'Cons are surprised very much, but Megatron welcomes the newcomer and calls him his «dear friend». This is a new Transformer. His name is Thrust, and he is the Decepticon's best tactician. He arrives on the scene just in time to help Megatron and company with a cunning plan to ambush the Autobots and get Optimus Prime on his own. Megatron begins to carry out this plan immediately. The Autobots locate a signal of a Mini-con. It comes from the deep and narrow canyon. They move towards this place. But it appears that it is a trap. The Decepticons fire on them from the ground and from the air. Optimus Prime and Megatron fight each other, while the 'Cons draw Smokescreen and Scavenger preventing them from sending the Skyboom Shield to Optimus. Optimus Prime is in the great danger. Things are looking really bad, until a spaceship rushes in to the battlefield. He transforms in a huge robot and attacks the Decepticons in the air. When Starscream asks his name, he answers: 'You can call me Jetfire, second command of the Autobots.' The appearance of Jetfire turns the course of the battle in favour of the Autobots. Thrust's plan is ruined, and the 'Cons warp out to their Base.
26	"Linkup"; Transliteration: "Rinkuappu" (Japanese: 合身(リンクアップ))	January 31, 2003
Optimus Prime is severely wounded during the last battle, and he is in a bad state. Red Alert repairs him. Jetfire is now acting commander of the Autobots. When he says that there is nothing to worry about when he's there, the kids suspect him to be somewhat a boaster. Meanwhile on the D-Base Thrust promises Megatron to work out a new plan of the battle. He is sure that now the Decepticons will defeat the Autobots without fail. The Autobots, too, know Thrust as an extremely skilful tactician whose advice often helped the Decepticons to win. But Jetfire thoughtlessly considers himself to be capable of gaining the upper hand of the 'Cons easily. The Minis inform the 'Bots about a plane circling above the A-Base for some time. This is Thrust himself. Jetfire dashes alone to fight him. But Thrust lures him in an ambush. The Decepticon plane Minis encircle Jetfire and fire on him. Then Starscream attacks him, too. The Autobots understand that their comrade is in danger. Hot Shot, Smokescreen and Blurr warp out to a little island near the battleplace with the purpose of aiding Jetfire. But just after their arriving on the island they are faced with the 'Cons waiting for them. Now only Optimus Prime can help them. And the brave leader of the 'Bots heads out for his soldiers though the kids pray him to stay on the A-Base. Optimus appears on the sky battlefield just in the moment when Starscream prepares to strike a mortal blow to Jetfire. Optimus Prime and Jetfire link up each other and form a new immense over-powerful robot Jet Convoy. Jet Convoy brings Starscream down and throws Megatron and Demolisher into the sea. So that Thrust's plan is a complete flop again. Optimus Prime advises Jetfire to behave more warily in the future, only to hear his answer that there is nothing to worry about while he's here.
27	"Detection"; Transliteration: "Shōtai" (Japanese: 発覚(しょうたい))	March 1, 2003
There is a peaceful day on the A-Base at last, so that Jetfire and Smokescreen can take the liberty of competing in arm-wrestling a little, and all the others watch their tournament. Alexis is a fan of them both, and the boys don't understand her. Meanwhile on the D-Base Thrust explains his recent failure by the fact that the 'Cons, unlike the 'Bots, don't know how to work as one team. He draws up just another battle plan for Megatron and promises him that some new Decepticons will soon enlist in his army. The Autobots repair the ancient spaceship and make preparations for departure to their native planet Cybertron. In that time Jetfire runs through the video tapes of the previous clashes between the Autobots and Decepticons on the Earth. The children are near him. Suddenly Jetfire pays attention to Sideways and notices that the 'tramp' acts rather strangely for a Decepticon. He wonders if Sideways is a Decepticon at all. On the D-Base Sideways incites Demolishor to destroy Thrust. He convinces him that it will be only for the Megatron's benefit. Demolishor believes him and haves a fight with Thrust. In the meantime, Sideways is sending messages to an unknown recipient. But just in this moment he is caught by Starscream. So his double game is revealed at last. Sideways tries to escape but Thrust overtakes him. Megatron cuts the traitor up with the Star Saber. Sideways' body is reduced to the debris but he turns out to be still alive although as a mysterious ghost. At the end of the episode, the Autobots engage in battle with the Decepticons on the seashore. Who will win a victory in this time?
28	"Awakening"; Transliteration: "Shōgeki" (Japanese: 豪腕(しょうげき))	March 8, 2003
This episode picks up where the last one left off. There is a fierce firing between the Autobots and the Decepticons. Unexpectedly an ominous huge battleship arrives. This is just one more Decepticon. His name is Tidal Wave. Thrust had summoned him to help Megatron and his army to defeat the Autobots. He is a real floating fortress with the tremendous firepower. Everybody is staggered. While Jetfire fights Thrust in the air, Hot Shot and Blurr attack Tidal Wave from under the sea and succeed in turning him upside down. He is sinking. It seems that the 'Bots will gain the upper hand any moment. But then Tidal Wave transforms himself into a robot and comes to the surface. He is true giant (even by Transformer standards), and his armour is impenetrable. He fires on the Autobots, and they are in a tight corner. Even Jet Convoy can't manage him. In that time the A-Base detects two Mini-con signals, one's icon being frozen and the other's pointing skyward. Alexis finds out one is already in the Base, while the other is on the Moon and a third right in between the duelling factions. The boys go to seek it. Alexis and Red Alert are on the command post. Suddenly they see Sideways on the monitor. He informs them that there are three Mini-cons which can link up into an all-powerful weapon named the Requiem Blaster and that if they want to save Optimus Prime they must find these Minis as quick as possible. Alexis doesn't believe that Sideways wishes them well, but Red Alert considers that there's no alternative. In the midst of searching for the Mini-con, Fred finds it by falling into a pit. After it is activated it runs off. The episode ends with the Autobots losing.
29	"Desperate"; Transliteration: "Utagoe" (Japanese: 共鳴(うたごえ))	March 15, 2003
On the A-Base the kids find a new Mini-con. He is acting strangely, tries to outrun and, when rounded up by the boys, fires at them. But Rad feels that he does so only with fear. At last the boys bring the Mini-con to the command post. Alexis tells them that this Mini-con is a member of the "Requiem Blaster" command. She asks the Mini-con (whose name is Skyblast) to help Optimus Prime to defeat Megatron, otherwise the Earth will be doomed to destruction. Rad promises him to accompany him if he agrees to go to the Autobots. Now Rad, Carlos and Skyblast together with Red Alert warp out to the battlefield. Meanwhile the fight is going totally bad for the Autobots. Tidal Wave is practically invulnerable for the Autobots' weapon. On one occasion, Hot-Shot tried to block his blows with the Skyboom Shield, only to end up being outmuscled and pushed away before being rescued. What is more, Tidal Wave transforms himself into a kind of flying machine for Megatron. Megatron and Optimus Prime are fighting in the air. Just in this time Red Alert and his passengers arrive to the battleplace. Thrust attacks them. Blurr, Red Alert and Hot Shot do their best to defend the kids and the Mini-con. Then suddenly Skyblast begins to sing an eerie tune to awaken the other two in the set that forms the Requiem Blaster. He does it quite at the right moment to save Optimus Prime's life. Both the Autobots and Decepticons are astonished by the immense power of the new super-weapon. Rad comes to the conclusion that the Mini-cons are not cowards at all. They are simply afraid their power to be used for the evil purposes.
30	"Runaway"; Transliteration: "Kakurega" (Japanese: 逃走(かくれが))	March 22, 2003
The kids decide to take the Mini-cons out of the base, because they don't want them to be used as weapons. Everything's OK until The Decepticons discover their hideout. Thrust is chasing the kids wanting the Mini-cons. He almost gets them, but Optimus Prime arrives right on time to save them. After that the Autobots have more respect in the Mini-cons.
31	"Past (Part 1 of 2)"; Transliteration: "In'nen (Zenpen)" (Japanese: 過去(いんねん) – 前編)	March 29, 2003
It happened on the Cybertron, a long time ago. The Autobot commander charged Hot Shot to train a young soldier named Wheeljack. Hot Shot and his trainee soon became the best friends. But during a battle Wheeljack was weighted down by the stone plate. Hot Shot couldn't release him single-handed and left him to get him help. Wheeljack promised to wait for him. But the commander didn't allow Hot Shot to return to his friend's side. Since then Hot Shot knew nothing of Wheeljack's fate and thought him to be dead. On the Earth a rookie makes his appearance on the A-Base. He is rather ridiculous and awkward youth whose name is Sideswipe. Once Blurr had saved his life, and now Sideswipe wishes at any price to serve under Blurr's command. Blurr, however, is not too much glad to have such a subordinate. So, by Optimus Prime's consent, he charges Hot Shot to take care of Sideswipe. Hot Shot is displeased that he has to fuss over such a misfit, of course. But he does his best to train Sideswipe though it is a very difficult task. One day, when returning to the Base after the drill, Hot Shot and Sideswipe notice a black car pursuing them. This car overtakes them and rams Hot Shot. Sideswipe tries to defend his trainer but the ominous black car throws him off the highway and then transforms itself into a robot. This is Wheeljack. He tells Hot Shot that it was Megatron who had found him and saved his life, and that he had joined up with the Decepticons since then. The episode ends with Wheeljack aiming a gun at Hot Shot.
32	"Past (Part 2 of 2)"; Transliteration: "Ketchaku (Kōhen)" (Japanese: 過去(けっちゃく) – 後編)	April 5, 2003
This episode picks up where the last one left off. Wheeljack explains Hot Shot that he is a Decepticon now, and then shoots at his former friend. Hot Shot is severely wounded. He regains consciousness when keeping his bed in the repair module. That is Sideswipe who delivered him to the A-Base. When Sideswipe calls on him, Hot Shot tells him the story of Wheeljack and reproaches himself in abandoning him. Some time after Hot Shot makes a secret getaway out of the hospital and sets off for meeting Wheeljack. Wheeljack waits for him at an old factory. He challenges Hot Shot to the mortal combat. Hot Shot and Wheeljack are facing off when Sideswipe shows up. Wheeljack takes him prisoner and then sets the factory on fire. He chains Sideswipe up on the top of an oil-tank, while speaking to him derisively that Hot Shot will abandon him exactly as he had once abandoned Wheeljack himself. But Sideswipe doesn't want to believe Wheeljack and summons Hot Shot to his aid. The fire flares up fiercely, and Wheeljack himself is in danger. Megatron rescues him again, as he had done ever so long ago. Meanwhile Hot Shot hastens to the help of his trainee and appears just in time to rescue him before the factory explodes. Thus the story has a happy end. Everybody is alive. And Sideswipe is now the enthusiastic admirer of Hot Shot (but the latter is not greatly delighted with such wild display of friendship, indeed).
33	"Sacrifice"; Transliteration: "Suteishi" (Japanese: 犠牲(すていし))	April 12, 2003
Thrust offers to Megatron his "Master Plan" to get the Requiem Blaster from the Autobots. He considers it necessary to make them fight and use the Requiem Blaster against the enemy, and he means Starscream for being his patsy. The Autobots lie in ambush in a forest and wait for the Decepticons' assault. Soon they see Starscream approaching quite alone, though being armed with the Star Saber. Starscream challenges the Autobots to a battle. His audacity bewilderes them, because they know that he isn't strong enough to manage them all. At last Optimus Prime takes up his challenge. They are facing off, while Megatron watches their duel from the cover waiting his turn to engage in battle. But, much to Megatron's surprise, neither Prime nor the other Autobots employ the Requiem Blaster. At the A-Base, the children are watching the camera, when Sideways makes it go crazy. He informs Thrust that the three Mini-cons are all back at the Autobots' base being guarded by Smokescreen, and the ingenious tactician changes his plan instantly. According to the new plan, the 'Cons warp in to the A-Base at once. As for Starscream, he has to go on with fighting the 'Bots so as not to let them suspect something wrong. Starscream is overpowered when Optimus Prime links up with Jetfire. He can't flee in safety because the warp gate turns out to be closed. Starscream calls for help in despair, but the Decepticons have abandoned him. They invade the A-Base to get the Blaster, while Smokescreen tries to defend it. Optimus hears him calling through the Matrix and orders his comrades to return to the Base immediately, leaving Starscream alone on the battlefield. But they arrive too late. Megatron seizes the Requiem Blaster and shoots Smokescreen before warping out. Smokescreen is fatally wounded, his body being almost melted away. All the Autobots pay the last honor to the dying hero and Rad realizes that even the Autobots feel emotional pain.
34	"Regeneration"; Transliteration: "Supāku" (Japanese: 生命(スパーク))	April 19, 2003
At the A-Base, Red Alert informs the rest of the team that he may be able to rebuild Smookescreen, since his spark (heart) still has a pulse. But that there is also chance that he may die while Red Alert is working on him. Meanwhile, Starscream, dirty, battered, bruised, and outraged finally returns to the D-Base and creams Thrust for closing the Warp-gate on him after which Megatron indifferently tells him to go clean himself up. Whilst Starscream's in the energon-bath-chamber, Demolishor shows up and demands that the Mini-cons be handed over on Megatron's orders. Starscream intimidates Demolishor and goes to Megatron personally. However, Megatron and Thrust plan to use Starscream as their personal dummy as a distraction to hopefully defeat the Autobots, but Starcream overhears their plot to rid of him. Starscream, fed up with being Megatron's punching bag, finally snaps and takes a swing at him with the Star Saber that turns the Decepticons against him. His rebellion leads him to injure most of the Decepticon soldiers and runs away, taking the Star Saber with him. Back at the A-Base, Hot Shot and Sideswipe are training when they hear the signal of the Decepticon's presence. Hot Shot, wanting revenge for Smokescreen, decides to go out and fight the Decepticons along with Sideswipe, but much to their surprise, it is Starscream being chased by Tidal Wave. Starscream is shot down and the two Autobots decide to fight. How Shot takes on Tidal Wave while Sideswipe chases Starscream. Optimus and Jetfire arrive to help and the two link up into Jet Convoy, but are no match for Tidal Wave's impenetrable armor. Starscream wishes to help and tosses Optimus the Star Saber and is able to damage Tidal Wave, forcing him to retreat. Starscream surrenders to the Autobots and asks them to join them. The Autobots are skeptical, however, believing that he will betray them at a certain point, but the kids believe that they can trust Starscream, which convinces Optimus to let Starscream join the Autobots. In turn, Starscream offers his data of the D-Base so that the Autobots can invade the Decepticons and rescue the Mini-Cons. Late that day, Hot Shot, who still doesn't trust Starscream, challenges him to a fight. The rest of the Autobots notice that both of them are missing when they are interrupted by Red Alert, who says that Smokescreen's spark was saved, but his body wasn't. Meanwhile, Hot Shot and Starscream are still fighting when a different Transformer breaks up the fight. The Transformer turns out to be Smokescreen with a new body, who tells Hot Shot that he appreciates Hot Shots actions to avenge him, but that he needs to get along with Starscream to defeat the Decepticons. Now, the Autobots are back in possession of the Star Saber and now have a new team member on their side.
35	"Rescue"; Transliteration: "Kaihō" (Japanese: 救出(かいほう))	April 26, 2003
By himself, Demolishor grumpily cleans up the Decepticon's base after Starscream's rampage. Turning around, Demolishor is surprised to see Starscream standing right behind him, and drops some of the items, and hits his own foot. Starscream asks him if he wants some company and activates the warpgate, allowing the Autobots inside the base. Demolishor sounds the alarm. The Autobots and Decepticons meet in Megatron's throne room. Megatron fires the Requiem Blaster at Starscream, but Smokescreen blocks the shot with the Skyboom Shield. A bright light from the impact fills the room, blinding the Autobots long enough for Megatron to retreat, leaving his troops behind to finish the battle. The Autobots and Decepticons engage in battle with each other (with Sideswipe attempting to take on Tidal Wave on his own). While Starscream is blinded by his vengeance, Laserbeak and Hot Shot are assigned to locate Perceptor. Perceptor runs away from Demolishor. When Demolishor backs Perceptor into a corner, Laserbeak flies into Demolisher's face just long enough to ruin Demolishor's aim. While the Decepticon stumbles about, Hot Shot arrives to punch Demolishor down. Perceptor runs ahead and finds himself in an encounter with Tidal Wave, and again Hot Shot comes to the Mini-Con's rescue. But because of Tidal Wave's power and size, Hot Shot has more difficulty taking the Decepticon down. Perceptor leaves and finds all his captured Mini-Con brothers, hidden in an underground facility where they're being put to work to assemble a gigantic spaceship. Perceptor says some blippy dialogue with the other Mini-Cons, when Megatron attacks. When Perceptor is grasped by the neck, the Mini-Cons begin one of their irregular chants, like the one played when the Requiem Blaster was first formed. The Minis all stop working on the space ship and surround an annoyed Megatron. When Megatron attempts to punish the insolent machines, Hot Shot attacks, covering the Mini-Con's escape. Tidal Wave arrives just in time to watch Megatron and Hot Shot race out, but Smokescreen shows up to keep Tidal Wave company. Sideswipe and Perceptor guide all the emancipated Mini-Cons through the Decepticon's warp gate, to the Autobot base. Megatron and Hot Shot continue to battle. Megatron is about to finally deactivate the Autobot, but Starscream slices Megatron's cannon off. Against both Hot Shot and Starscream, Megatron falls. With the Mini-Cons safe, Optimus calls his forces to return to the Autobot base, but Starscream would rather stay to finish off Megatron. Starscream agrees to return with the Autobots – but is left feeling upset about it.
36	"Mars"; Transliteration: "Shōtotsu" (Japanese: 火星(しょうとつ))	May 3, 2003
Starscream rages, frustrated that the Autobots do not share his priority of destroying Megatron. His Mini-Con partner Swindle and the Air Defense Team try to console him, followed by Alexis, but he is too wrapped up in his own self-doubts to listen to them. While Megatron rages about his own recent setback, Thrust receives some news that might calm him down; Sideways claims that while Megatron's Mini-Con Requiem Blaster is limited in its power, it would be unstoppable in combination with Starscream's Star Saber and the Autobots' Skyboom Shield. The Autobots on Earth detect a new Mini-Con signal, but as it is on Mars only Jetfire and Starscream would be capable of flying there to retrieve it. The kids are upset that they can't go, but ask Jetfire for a souvenir, like maybe a moon rock. Jetfire isn't happy to be bringing Starscream at all, but they head out, with Jetfire wielding the Skyboom and Starscream wielding the Star Saber. Megatron, having been briefed by Thrust on the Mini-Con and on the potential of the three weapons, recognizes that the Autobots' mission to Mars is the perfect opportunity to unite the Mini-Con weapons. On Mars, Starscream is itching for a fight with Megatron, and he seems to get his wish as an ominous shape appears in the stormy skies above. Starscream leaps to attack and is annoyed to find that it's only Tidal Wave, who demands the Star Saber and knocks Starscream to the planet's surface. Jetfire, having also noticed the Decepticon intruder as well, decides to investigate. Starscream is wounded seriously, his plazma gun being broken off, and he has no energy enough to fly. When he pulls himself together, he finds the Air Defense Team trying to cheer him on. He drives them away, screaming that he doesn't need their pity, only to immediately lament that now even the Mini-Cons have abandoned him. He declares that one day he will surely crush Megatron. He notices that while he has been talking to himself, he has been absent-mindedly crushing a Martian rock, which he then looks at with interest. Soon, the Air Defense Team leads Comettor and Jetfire to Starscream's aid. The two bulks argue over Starscream's responsibilities, which culminates in Jetfire arresting Starscream for insubordination. Optimus agrees, and Jetfire heads home with Starscream in tow and the Mini-Con still helpless. On the journey home, Jetfire «educates» Starscream by explaining him all the advantages of the team work. Fortuitously Starscream spots the Mini-Con they have been searching for on a nearby asteroid. Jetfire entrusts Starscream with retrieving the Mini-Con, who has been revealed as Firebot, but a new assault by Tidal Wave interrupts them. With the Autobots pinned down, Megatron and Thrust teleport to the battle. Starscream cries out for Jetfire to release his handcuffs and let him help, but Jetfire can't do so. With no other recourse, Starscream pleads with Firebot to open fire on the Decepticons. He explains that while the Autobots will protect the Mini-Con, the Decepticons will only use him as a tool for war. Firebot seems to understand, as he holds off Tidal Wave long enough for Starscream can get him to safety. Starscream and Jetfire face off against Megatron, but as they do their Mini-Con weapons emit a strange golden glow which grows to envelop all three of them. The power of the three weapons knocks Tidal Wave and Thrust away, and apparently knocks Megatron unconscious, allowing Starscream and Jetfire to escape. Back at the Autobot base, Optimus and Jetfire agree that the mysterious power the Mini-Con weapons have displayed should be kept secret. While the kids chat with Jetfire, who disappoints them when he explains he hasn't brought them a souvenir, Alexis explains to Starscream how proud she is of him for convincing Firebot to join the Autobots. She knows he cares for the Mini-Cons, and that's why she feels he belongs on the Autobot side. Starscream counters that his only mission is to destroy Megatron, and stomps off, but leaves behind the chunk of rock he had found on Mars. Alexis is very excited to see it, and calls the other kids over to look at it as a treasure. Alexis notes that Starscream has shown that he truly cares, and she hopes that soon he will join the Autobots for good.
37	"Crack"; Transliteration: "Puraido" (Japanese: 決意(プライド))	May 10, 2003
In a secret meeting, Sideways and Thrust plot how to get the Mini-Con weapons away from the Autobots. It's all very ominous. On Earth, Starscream finds he doesn't feel very motivated to help the Autobots build their stupid spaceship. He feels it's a waste of time when they could be off killing Megatron instead of worrying about Mini-Cons. Optimus Prime explains to Hot Shot, who is exasperated with Starscream's apathy, that the Autobots should take this opportunity to try and understand what makes Autobots and Decepticons different, and learn how to work together; after all, an inability to make such a rapport is why the two factions have been fighting for so long. Starscream, meanwhile, is quite shocked to find the human kids throwing him a surprise party. It was Alexis's idea, to thank him for the Mars rock he previously gave her. The kids present him with a crudely stitched but brightly colorful chamois, which they have made for him themselves and claim is for cleaning the Star Saber. Starscream explains to them that he has never received a present before, so he doesn't know how to react. When Jetfire arrives to assign Starscream to monitor duty, Starscream figures that if he just slacks off, someone else will do it; Alexis has to explain the notion of teamwork to him. Starscream storms off after her abortive lecture, claiming that he needs some peace and quiet. As with most of what Starscream says and does, this is total bluster, and he does in fact end up doing his monitor duty as assigned. When a bizarre signal appears on the screens, he goes out to investigate its source. He finds Thrust, who tries to talk Starscream into rejoining the Decepticons so that the two of them can work against Megatron from within. Fred and Billy happen by just in time to hear Thrust mention that if Starscream were to bring the Skyboom Shield to Megatron, he might be welcomed back. Back at the Autobot base, Starscream watches the Race Team—the Mini-Cons who combine to form the Skyboom—and broods. Fred and Billy tell the Autobots about Thrust's appearance and how Starscream chased him away. Jetfire makes a crack about how Fred shouldn't consider Starscream a hero, which is, of course, the moment when Starscream walks in on the conversation. An awkward moment is shared by all before the Decepticon-turned-Autobot turns and exits. Smokescreen arrives shortly thereafter, reporting that the Race Team have disappeared. Billy and Fred remember that Thrust wanted them, which leads the Autobots—especially Hot Shot—to accuse Starscream of stealing them. Starscream doesn't bother to defend himself; he decides that trying to get along with the Autobots is a failed experiment. The tense situation is interrupted by a Decepticon attack, which draws the Autobots out to fight. Starscream charges out with his erstwhile comrades, eager to face Thrust, drawing the Star Saber and his chamois. Thrust is still bent on convincing Starscream to work with him against Megatron. Hot Shot, who had been chased into a forest by Tidal Wave, runs into Alexis, Carlos, Rad, and the Mini-Con Race Team. He learns that the kids had simply taken the Mini-Cons for a walk, conveniently without notifying anyone. Hot Shot realizes he was wrong to accuse Starscream, and asks the Mini-Cons to help him. Meanwhile, Starscream is at a loss to explain to himself why he won't just kill Thrust and be done with the whole sorry affair. Thrust opines that working alongside the Autobots has caused him to go soft and forget his heritage. On the ground, Smokescreen tosses the Skyboom Shield to Optimus, but Starscream intercepts it giving everyone a shocking sensation. Wielding both it and the Star Saber, Starscream rushes to meet with Thrust, letting the chamois fall back to Earth behind him. He wonders momentarily if he's doing the right thing, but he knows that he must go to any length to bring Megatron down. He knows that he will never forget the human kids, and in his spark he thanks them.
38	"Threaten"; Transliteration: "Hyudora Kyanon" (Japanese: 脅威(ヒュドラキャノン))	October 3, 2003
After experimenting with their new Hydra cannon on a comet, Megatron tells Starscream to target Earth! Can the confused Transformer carry his order out?
39	"Crisis"; Transliteration: "Kiki" (Japanese: 地球(きき))	October 10, 2003
In this episode, Megatron forms the Hydra Cannon, made up of the Star Saber, Skyboom Shield and the Requiem Blaster. He plans to use it to destroy the Autobot HQ on Earth. Instead, it was used to nearly destroy the Earth's orbit! Optimus Prime and Jetfire both set out to disengage the Hydra Cannon and free the Mini-Cons. Megatron wasn't about to let Optimus and Jetfire destroy his cannon, therefore he sent Demolisher, Cyclonus, Wheeljack, and Tidalwave to destroy them, and to test his loyalty, sent Starscream. Thrust stayed behind to charge up the Hydra Cannon. Optimus appeared to be winning, so, Megatron took him on, while Jetfire was pinned down by demolisher, Wheeljack and Cyclonus. Megatron pushed Optimus' face towards Earth to watch it be destroyed, but Optimus zapped him with the Leaders Matrix. Thrust fired the Hydra cannon, but somehow, Optimus manages to escape and jump in front of the cannon. Optimus uses his Matrix to absorb the blast, but sacrifices himself in the process. All that is left is Optimus' matrix! Jetfire went to look for the remains of his fallen leader, but all that was found was some space dust! Even though he had finally defeated his enemy, Megatron cried. Jetfire swore he would never forget his leader.
40	"Remorse"; Transliteration: "Aseri" (Japanese: 悔恨(あせり))	October 17, 2003
Hot Shot gets a little put out as he looks at the situation facing them and takes off. The others and the kids devise a plan that makes him see there is hope and they have to keep fighting. Hot Shot becomes leader of the Autobots.
41	"Depart"; Transliteration: "Tabidachi" (Japanese: 出立(たびだち))	October 24, 2003
The Autobots are ready to head home and leave the kids behind. Rad has a nightmare in which the Autobot ship is shot down and Highwire collapses on the floor saying "You must help us, Rad." In the end, Perceptor and the other Mini-Cons surround the spaceship and make the Autobots bring the children with them. Before departing, Rad had told his father about the Autobots and lured the humans to the base just as the kids and the Autobots leave for Cybertron.
42	"Miracle"; Transliteration: "Fukkatsu" (Japanese: 奇跡(ふっかつ))	October 31, 2003
As the Decepticons attack the Autobots' ship, the Mini-Cons bring Optimus Prime back to life.
43	"Puppet"; Transliteration: "Nisemono" (Japanese: 怪物(にせもの))	November 7, 2003
Optimus Prime is revived by the Mini-cons but the reunion is short as Red alert and Hotshot are pulled into a portal. A portal also pulls in Megatron on his ship as well as Starscream, Tidal wave and Demolisher. The ones pulled through a portal end up on a strange planet where they find Nemesis Prime. Megatron, Demolisher, Tidal wave, Starscream, Hotshot and Red Alert team up to defeat Nemesis Prime but fail. The Mini-cons revive the fallen soldiers into new colored armor. Megatron becomes Galvatron and kills Nemesis Prime with the help of Optimus Prime; albeit it's then revealed that Nemesis Prime was another hologram of Sideways all along. Thereafter, the rest of both sides arrive and depart the planet.
44	"Uprising"; Transliteration: "Seibātoron" (Japanese: 帰還(セイバートロン))	November 14, 2003
The Decepticons are back on Cybertron with the Autobots hot on their heels; provoking yet another battle between both sides once again. During the battle, Optimus encounters Sideways and soon starts to puzzle the latter's cause behind their frequent battles before finding out that the Mini-Cons are concerned about a black hole called Unicron. Meanwhile at the Decepticon base, Galvatron is unaware that Thrust's loyalty to him has shattered for good.
45	"Dash"; Transliteration: "Uragiri" (Japanese: 確信(うらぎり))	November 21, 2003
Hot Shot makes a daring raid upon the Decepticons' base to try to convince Galvatron that the two sides should combine to face Unicron. The conversation is cut short when Thrust attempts to intervene in order to keep his betrayal a secret, only for Galvatron to question his oddly behaviour as Starscream confronts him over his recent deception. Because of this, Thrust's treachery is exposed and he ends up fleeing with both the Skyboom Shield and Requiem Blaster themselves.
46	"Drift"; Transliteration: "Shinjitsu" (Japanese: 運命(しんじつ))	November 28, 2003
The kids discover the shocking truth about the Mini-Cons and learn the pivotal role they played in how the Mini-Cons came to Earth 4 million years ago: Mini-Cons were created from Unicorn's cells to influence the Transformers War. Rad then meets past High Wire convincing him to go to Earth so that all of this would make sense.
47	"Portent"; Transliteration: "Pendanto" (Japanese: 信頼(ペンダント))	December 5, 2003
The kids, Hot Shot, Wheeljack and Starscream chase Thrust into the bowels of Unicron, but fail after a confrontation with Sideways that leads to him and Thrust delivering 2 out of 3 weapons to the heart. Acid vines and even parasites forced them to retreat.
48	"Cramp"; Transliteration: "Shin'nen" (Japanese: 決死(しんねん))	December 8, 2003
Optimus Prime decides to talk to Galvatron, hoping that the Autobots and Decepticons can join forces to defeat Unicron, but Galvatron suspects that it's all a trap. While the two leaders are fighting, Starscream appears and attacks Galvatron that ends with the latter striking the former. Starscream then manages to show both sides what the important thing is: defeating Unicron. It is then Starscream tries to attack Unicron, but ultimately he is blasted and killed by Unicron. Moments later, Sideways appears and steals the Star Saber from Galvatron and Optimus Prime before fleeing back to Unicron's heart. Alexis succumbs in grief over Starscream's death, nevertheless, his last role finally prompted alliance between the Autobots and Decepticons.
49	"Alliance"; Transliteration: "Yunikuron" (Japanese: 覚醒(ユニクロン))	December 9, 2003
As Unicron fires a wave at Cybertron, the Decepticons debate their leader's decision to join forces with the Autobots just as Galvatron surprisingly mourns Starscream's scarifice by calling him a "true soldier". Meanwhile, deep inside Unicron, Sideways plants the Star Saber near the planet-eater's spark, which is wrapped in organics. Unicron attacks Cybertron, forcing the Autobots and Decepticons to flee to their ships. Though some are destroyed (mainly Decepticons), the Mini-cons provide shielding. Once in safe orbit, Optimus and Galvatron shook hands, declaring that both Autobots and Decepticons fight together for peace and harmony to defeat Unicron. The transformers armada fires at Unicron it has no effect. Two cruisers tried to get closer but were shot. Optimus sends Hot Shot, Demolisher, Cyclonus, Sideswipe and a team of Decepticons in pods to check for Unicron's weak spot. Cyclonus and the team go off, shooting everything in sight; Demolisher and Blackout go solo; and Hot Shot and Sideswipe go do their jobs. Just then, Unicron starts to transform while laser pods start attacking the away team. The armada starts firing away while the team had difficulty getting off. Jet Optimus go to rescue them and gets saved by Galvatron. As they get away, Unicron's transformation into robot mode is complete.
50	"Union"; Transliteration: "Sōryokusen" (Japanese: 連合(そうりょくせん))	December 10, 2003
As Autobot and Decepticon ships fled Unicron, Thrust gleams at victory. The scene flashes back to Sideways planting the Star Saber near Unicron's spark. Meanwhile, Optimus and Galvatron plans an infiltration to enter Unicron. Just then, Unicron heads for Cybertron. Hot Shot and Wheeljack head out in fighters but do little damage. Thrust gloats and demands Unicron attack but is instead ambushed by the transformers fighters. Hoist finds a weak point on Unicron's neck and so an attack is made. Unicron opens his chest and fires his cannon, destroying a portion of Cybertron. Using the Decepticon flagship, they held back the attack. It is then both Optimus and Galvatron powerlinx themselves as they head towards Unicron, but not before Galvatron confronts Thrust for his betrayal. Thrust tried to verbally defend himself and is about to fly away, but fell in Unicron's shoulder joint and pleaded for help. Galvatron dismisses Thrust and instead gives him two choices: Thrust would be blasted and killed then, or he would get out himself and if he did there would be no place to hide. Thrust is then crushed to death as Galvatron walks away. Meanwhile, the Mini-cons joined together and fought back against their creator while Galvatron and Optimus enter the behemoth. The Street Action team proposes to go inside Unicron, which is also accessible through the underground warpgate. The Mini-Cons and the kids went through before the tunnel collapses on Red Alert.
51	"Origin"; Transliteration: "Kessen" (Japanese: 終結(けっせん))	December 11, 2003
Red Alert survives the cave-in he was trapped in while he was dropping off the kids at the underground portal to Unicron. Above the ruined landscape, he can see Unicron battle against the combined forces of Autobots and Decepticons, and the giant Mini-Con duplicate of Unicron. Inside of Unicron, the kids explore, searching for Optimus and Galvatron. The two leaders stand in the same chamber of Unicron's core, where the three Mini-Con weapons are plugged into the behemoth. From the core of the monstrosity, Sideways emerges to welcome the two before exposing himself as Unicron. He then explains that he increased his power by leaching energy from the war between the Autobots and Decepticons that had lasted for so long. When Galvatron complains that Unicron has become long-winded, Unicron suspends the two leaders in black tentacles, absorbing Optimus' very essence. Unicron continues to question Optimus's own motives, suspecting that Optimus loves the smell of battle. Elsewhere, the other Autobots and Deceptions continue to battle Unicron's giant duplicate; Sideswipe manages to blast open a hole in Unicron's throat, letting a team of fliers inside. The small group of jets fly through the tunnels of Unicron's interior, trying to avoid being destroyed by the shifting terrain. But their efforts to combat Unicron actually feed their enemy the kind of energy that powers him. As soon as his attackers escape out his mouth, he astonishes them by healing all the damage they have inflicted against him. Back in Unicron's core, High Wire objects to Unicron's deconstruction of Optimus. A group of Mini-Cons approach the Sideways figure, while outside, the glowing "Mini-Cron" leaks its component Mini-Cons into Unicron, who laughs and reboots the personalities of the Mini-Cons, returning them to their loyal drone-like state. With the Mini-Cons out of the way, Unicron captures the kids and continues trying to convince Optimus to willingly merge his essence into Unicron. Rad awakens in his bed, apparently on Earth. After a second, the location blurs into the desert where the Autobots and the Decepticons first battled, where he meets up with Alexis and the other kids. The background shifts again to the part of Unicron that is Galvatron's fantasy of dominance. Alexis uses her own mind to move the kids to a more pleasant delusion – but the kids are still aware of Unicron's devouring of Cybertron. Rad sets out to locate High Wire, but Unicron takes control of the mindscape. Rad's cries for help reawaken High Wire's true, friendly personality. All the Mini-Cons move against their evil creator, freeing the three Mini-Con weapons. With Unicron disabled, Sideways tries to lash out at High-Wire, but Optimus fatally blasts Sideways with the Requiem Blaster. With Sideways eliminated and Unicron no longer being a threat, Galvatron challenges Optimus.
52	"Mortal Combat"; Transliteration: "Shitō" (Japanese: 死闘)	December 12, 2003
The alliance between the Transformers leaders ends. Hotshot and the other Transformers attack Unicron once more. Optimus Prime and Galvatron fight to the death. It ended only after Galvatron makes a heroic sacrifice to destroy Unicron. After the battle, Rad, Carlos, Alexis, Billy and Fred are returned to Earth. A charred Optimus Prime is seen floating through space. At the very end the remains of Unicron drift through space, showing the war is not over.
