= List of VeggieTales in the House episodes =

VeggieTales in the House premiered on November 26, 2014, when the first five episodes were released. The next five episodes were released on January 30, 2015, with the last five episodes released on April 17, 2015. Season 2 was released on September 25, 2015. Season 3 premiered on March 25, 2016. Season 4 premiered on September 23, 2016. A follow-up series, titled VeggieTales in the City, premiered on February 24, 2017, on Netflix.

== Series overview ==
Season	Segments	Episodes		Originally released
1	10	15	5	November 26, 2014
1	10	15	5	January 30, 2015
1	10	15	5	April 17, 2015
2	22	11		September 25, 2015
3	26	13		March 25, 2016
4	26	13		September 23, 2016

== Episodes ==
=== Season 1 (2014–15) ===
No. overall	Segment No.	Title	Directed by	Written by	Original release date
1a	1	"Puppies and Guppies"	Craig George	Ethan Nicolle	November 26, 2014
Larry and Laura want to adopt puppies but need money for supplies, so Pa Grape gives them jobs at his store. Larry and Laura learn a hard lesson in responsibility.
1b	2	"Sorry, We're Closed Today"	Tim Hodge	Eric Branscum	November 26, 2014
The gang tries to hide from each other in Pa Grape's store and things get heated when they're locked in, making them learn to cooperate.
2a	3	"Bob and the Awesome Frosting Mustache"	Craig George	Ethan Nicolle	November 26, 2014
Bob wants to grow a mustache like the one Tom Celeriac has so he can feel brave, and shows off his newly acquired facial hair during a musical showcase, but ends up learning that it is better to be himself.
2b	4	"Bob and Larry: Gettin' Angry"	Tim Hodge	Eric Branscum	November 26, 2014
When Bob and Larry get into a heated fight, Petunia gives advice to not let the sun go down on their anger, causing the boys to not go to bed until one of them apologizes.
3a	5	"Bob's Bad Breath"	Bill Breneisen	Ethan Nicolle	November 26, 2014
Larry's sloppy behavior and poor hygiene get on Bob's nerves when he doesn't get any sleep for his new job as the greeter at Pa Grape's store.
3b	6	"Trading Places"	Craig George	Eric Branscum	November 26, 2014
Fed up with their roommates' antics, Bob and Jimmy decide to become roommates while Larry and Jerry do the same, but both sides end up with unexpected results.
4a	7	"Jimmy and Jerry Are Rich"	Bill Breneisen	Eric Branscum	November 26, 2014
Believing that Jimmy and Jerry inherited a great fortune, Bob and Larry try to exploit their friendship with the gourd brothers so they can buy them a monster truck.
4b	8	"Feelin' Hot, Hot, Hot!"	Tim Hodge	Eric Branscum	November 26, 2014
During a cold day, Petunia watches Pa Grape's store while he's absent and is forbidden from turning up the temperature and Petunia discovers what happens when you do a bad thing "just a little bit".
5a	9	"Laura at Bat"	Craig George	Ethan Nicolle	November 26, 2014
Laura thinks that just dreaming about being good at baseball will help her achieve her goal, only to learn a lesson about working for your goals.
5b	10	"Pie Fight!"	Bill Breneisen	Eric Branscum	November 26, 2014
Madame Blueberry is jealous of Bob's victory over winning a pie-baking contest to the point where she gossips about his supposed cheating.
6a	11	"Pa Grape's Son"	Tim Hodge	Eric Branscum	January 30, 2015
Pa Grape takes in Jean-Claude as his son for a day so they can partake in the father-son picnic.
6b	12	"Larry's Cardboard Thumb"	Bill Breneisen	Eric Branscum	January 30, 2015
Larry's determination to look after Petunia's flowers ends in a disaster when he accidentally destroys all her plants.
7a	13	"The Gong Heard 'Round the House"	Tim Hodge	Eric Branscum	January 30, 2015
When the Mayor says that the most generous person will get their name put on the new town shelter, Bob borrows a gong and bangs it to get attention for all his good deeds. When the rest of the town follows in his footsteps, everyone learns what true generosity is all about.
7b	14	"When the Dust Bunnies Came to Town"	Bill Breneisen	Eric Branscum	January 30, 2015
Against the advice of elders, Larry, Junior, and Mayor Asparagus open a vent, inadvertently unleashing a plethora of dust bunnies.
8a	15	"The Bucket List"	Craig George	Ethan Nicolle	January 30, 2015
Bob and Larry cause turmoil for Ichabeezer when trying to be nice to him in spite of his rashness.
8b	16	"A Gift for Singing"	Tim Hodge	Ethan Nicolle	January 30, 2015
When Madame Blueberry is asked to sing the new jingle at Pa Grape's store, but thinks Petunia is better suited for the job, she is tempted by Ichabeezer to sabotage the chance of letting Petunia share her talent. Meanwhile, Larry is jealous of Laura's ability to sell more juice pops.
9a	17	"Lie-Monade"	Bill Breneisen	Doug TenNapel	January 30, 2015
Larry cons the townsfolk out of their money so he can purchase a new video game via "magical" lemonade, but his lies cause him to rethink his blunder.
9b	18	"Let's Build a Fort"	Craig George	Eric Branscum	January 30, 2015
Junior's dad chooses to go bowling after he made a deal to help Junior build a fort, but realizes his error after Junior, Laura, and Larry end up in danger after trying to do it on their own.
10a	19	"Bacon and Ice Cream"	Tim Hodge	Ethan Nicolle	January 30, 2015
While Larry is running the ice cream cart, Pa Grape asks Larry to take the zany new guy, Bacon Bill, under his wing, much to Larry's dismay.
10b	20	"For the Honor of LarryBoy"	Bill Breneisen	Ethan Nicolle	January 30, 2015
Ichabeezer's thankless behavior causes LarryBoy to refuse to help him ever again, letting him be taken by the villainous Motato.
11a	21	"The Birthday Thief"	Craig George	Ethan Nicolle	April 17, 2015
Sad at having his own birthday forgotten, Motato creates a machine to steal the birthdays of the towns children. LarryBoy and Junior must save Laura after she is also sucked up by the machine.
11b	22	"Junior Gets a Pet"	Tim Hodge	Ethan Nicolle	April 17, 2015
Despite his dad's warnings, Junior befriends a wild "Bufflorange", and runs away from home to play with him.
12a	23	"Cool as a Cucumber"	Bill Breneisen	Mike Nelson	April 17, 2015
After being shunned by Jimmy and Jerry for not being 'cool enough', Larry begins wearing a pair of shades and develops a selfish personality to fit in.
12b	24	"The Rich Young Comic Ruler"	Craig George	Eric Branscum	April 17, 2015
Larry is reluctant to share the comic books he collected as donations for the town library, but a trick played on him by Ichabeezer helps him learn the value of sharing.
13a	25	"Popcorntastrophe"	Tim Hodge	Ethan Nicolle	April 17, 2015
Bob, Larry, and Madame Blueberry accidentally flood the town with giant, burnt popcorn, but are forgiven and not punished by Mayor Archibald. When Bob later wants Ichabeezer to pay for breaking his TV, he learns that everyone deserves mercy.
13b	26	"Junior Jetpack"	Bill Breneisen	Ethan Nicolle	April 17, 2015
LarryBoy is annoyed by Junior, who is calling himself Junior Jetpack and asking to be LarryBoy's sidekick, but Ichabeezer proves to both of them that even little guys can be heroes.
14a	27	"Monster Manners"	Craig George	Ethan Nicolle	April 17, 2015
When Motato's new "super radish soldier", Randy, is injured, he is found and cared for by Madame Blueberry and Petunia, who teach him manners and civilized behavior.
14b	28	"You, Me and Tiny Pea"	Tim Hodge	Mike Nelson	April 17, 2015
Tired of being treated like a child by his dad, Junior joins his friend Tiny Pea in sailing to the deep end of the koi pond to prove that he is grown up.
15a	29	"Jenna Chive Live"	Bill Breneisen	Doug TenNapel	April 17, 2015
Pop star Jenna Chive arrives in town in disguise, wanting a break from performing, but learns that she should use her talents because they are meant to be shared with others. Guest voice: China Anne McClain as Jenna Chive
15b	30	"Captain LarryBeard"	Craig George	Eric Branscum	April 17, 2015
Larry unintentionally takes Ichabeezer's missing toy pirate ship and refuses to return it, claiming "finders keepers", despite Bob's warnings on taking other people's things.

=== Season 2 (2015) ===
No. overall	Segment No.	Title	Directed by	Written by	Original release date
16a	31	"The Great Ice Cream Chase"	Tim Hodge	Mike Nelson	September 25, 2015
When Bob is sick and will only feel better if he gets his favorite, rare ice cream flavor, Larry needs help to avoid distractions and get it home before it melts.
16b	32	"The Guppy Whisperer"	Bill Breneisen	Eric Branscum	September 25, 2015
Jimmy and Jerry adopt a guppy named Happy Sunshine Bubbles, but have a hard time caring for her properly.
17a	33	"The Silly Ray"	Craig George	Ethan Nicolle	September 25, 2015
When Bob will be fired from his job as the mayor's speech writer if he can't write a silly speech, Larry zaps him with his 'silly ray'. Unfortunately, Silly Bob's carelessness and zany behavior get on everyone's nerves.
17b	34	"The Camp Out"	Tim Hodge	Ethan Nicolle	September 25, 2015
Bob wants to camp by himself so that he won't have to share his s'mores, but this backfires when Motato and his radishes steal them.
18a	35	"Monster Truck Flower Delivery"	Bill Breneisen	Wes Haula	September 25, 2015
During the opening of their flower shop, Petunia and Tina Celerina discover that they have received a monster truck instead of the delivery truck they ordered, and learn about not giving up, even when things don't work out the way they want.
18b	36	"Vote for Archibald"	Craig George	Ethan Nicolle	September 25, 2015
When Tom Celeriac runs for mayor, Mayor Archibald attempts to make himself as famous and cool as his opponent, only to discover that it is better to be himself.
19a	37	"Ready for Action"	Tim Hodge	Eric Branscum	September 25, 2015
Larry, Bob, and Mr. Lunt train as police officers with Officer Wedge for the position as his partner and learn about how important it is to do the right thing, even when no one is looking.
19b	38	"Sickabeezer"	Bill Breneisen	Eric Branscum	September 25, 2015
Bob promises to take care of Ichabeezer, who is sick with the "sniccups", but lets his desire to go fishing get in the way of putting others first.
20a	39	"Plant-demonium"	Craig George	Ethan Nicolle	September 25, 2015
When Petunia becomes obsessed with creating a plant that will impress the writers of the 'Plant Snob Monthly' magazine, her pride creates a giant plant monster.
20b	40	"DUO Day"	Tim Hodge	Wes Halula	September 25, 2015
Larry Boy and Junior Jetpack decide to officially become a superhero duo, but immediately begin fighting, which interferes with their ability to battle Motato and his new army of kitchen appliances.
21a	41	"Mayoral Bike Lessons"	Bill Breneisen	Eric Branscum	September 25, 2015
When Beau Rockly appears in town to find out Mayor Archibald's secret to use on his gossip show, the Mayor tells seeks Larry's because he doesn't know how to ride a bike and Larry struggles to keep his friend's secret.
21b	42	"It"	Tim Hodge	Eric Branscum	September 25, 2015
Larry's obsession with winning every game of tag takes the fun out of the game for the whole town.
22a	43	"Callie Flower"	Craig George	Wes Halula	September 25, 2015
Laura is embarrassed when she is partnered with the weird new girl, Callie Flower, in science class, but learns not to judge others based on gossip and rumors.
22b	44	"World of Whiners"	Bill Breneisen	Ethan Nicolle	September 25, 2015
When Laura Carrot and her friends take Icabeezer's advice to whine to get everything they want, everyone in town is infected with a case of 'the whines' and begins constantly complaining.
23a	45	"Two Birthdays"	Craig George	Wes Halula	September 25, 2015
Despite Bob and Pa's advice, Tina Celerina tries to plan Junior's birthday party and Mayor Archibald's formal dinner party at the same time, and nearly causes a disaster.
23b	46	"Playground Tales"	Tim Hodge	Eric Branscum	September 25, 2015
After hearing his classmates' tales of Gary Garlic, the new kid, being a super-powered bully, Junior is afraid of him, but is reminded by his parents to not judge others by their appearance.
24a	47	"Spacetato"	Bill Breneisen	Ethan Nicolle	September 25, 2015
When Captain Mike opens a children's space camp, Junior is bored by his father's practical lessons, but learns the importance of listening to your "teachers" in life when a disguised Motato attacks.
24b	48	"Starved for Attention"	Craig George	Ethan Nicolle	September 25, 2015
Junior Jetpack becomes jealous when Beau Rockly wants to make a documentary about LarryBoy, but Larry lectures him about doing the right thing because it is right, not because it can earn fame for himself.
25a	49	"The Imposters"	Tim Hodge	Eric Branscum	September 25, 2015
When Motato wants to steal Bob's weather machine, he attempts by wearing masks so he can trick Bob and Larry into giving it to him, all the while he seizes the opportunity to also trick them into saying mean things about others.
25b	50	"Place Trading"	Bill Breneisen	Wes Halula	September 25, 2015
When Ichabeezer gets sick of having people ask him for money and Larry gets sick of having to work and clean up after himself, they decide to replace each other, only to discover that neither one has it as easy as they thought.
26a	51	"Locked Out"	Craig George	Eric Branscum	September 25, 2015
When Larry's panicking gets him and Bob locked out of their apartment, and then the house, they must learn how to remain calm to get back home.
26b	52	"Coach Ichabeezer"	Tim Hodge	Ethan Nicolle	September 25, 2015
When Ichabeezer joins the town Little League team, he fires Larry as coach and leads all the kids to quit by being too bossy. In the end, everyone realizes that it doesn't matter what other people think of you, as long as you try your best.

=== Season 3 (2016) ===
No. overall	Segment No.	Title	Directed by	Written by	Original release date
27a	53	"Scaredy Cat Bootcamp"	Bill Breneisen	Eric Branscum	March 25, 2016
Mr. Pea decides to help Bob, Larry, Mr. Lunt, and Tina Cellerina face their fears in the worst possible way. Meanwhile, Jimmy and Jerry try to make their pet dust bunny take a bath.
27b	54	"Ichabeezer Moves Out"	Craig George	Wes Halula	March 25, 2016
Annoyed by the other veggies, Ichabeezer tries to relocate, but soon learns about being thankful for what he has.
28a	55	"The Missing Jetpack"	Tim Hodge	Ethan Nicolle	March 25, 2016
Junior's Jetpack is missing from Mr. Lunt's store, so to have more time to find it, Lunt lies and claims that Motato stole it.
28b	56	"Bacon vs. Tomato"	Bill Breneisen	Doug TenNapel	March 25, 2016
Bob is worried that Larry considers Bacon Bill his new best friend, so he pulls out all the stops to impress Larry.
29a	57	"Motato Gets a Job"	Craig George	Eric Branscum	March 25, 2016
Motato is sentenced to work at Pa Grape's store, which leads to Larry learning a lesson in working hard.
29b	58	"Pet Day"	Tim Hodge	Ethan Nicolle	March 25, 2016
Junior and Tiny Pea's dads take ridiculous measures to find the perfect pets for their sons.
30a	59	"Blueberry's Tickets"	Bill Breneisen	Eric Branscum	March 25, 2016
Madame Blueberry wins tickets to a concert, which makes everybody go head over heels trying to impress her so they can have the extra ticket.
30b	60	"A Club Divided"	Craig George	Eric Branscum	March 25, 2016
Junior, Laura, Gary and Callie get into conflict when they are assigned to build a clubhouse. Meanwhile, Larry and Bob try to deliver a priceless vase to Pa Grape's store.
31a	61	"Laura's Animal Babysitting Service"	Tim Hodge	Eric Branscum	March 25, 2016
Laura tries to single-handedly take care of various animals but loses them in the process, making her learn the value of having assistance. Meanwhile, Ichabeezer misses spending time with his dog Rooney.
31b	62	"Rise of Night Pony"	Bill Breneisen	Ethan Nicolle	March 25, 2016
Laura learns that Granny Asparagus is moonlighting as a ninja and must save her when Motato forces her to bake cookies.
32a	63	"Takeasaurus"	Craig George	Kristine Lacey	March 25, 2016
Motato unleashes a creature dubbed "The Takeasaurus" to steal items from the townsfolk.
32b	64	"The Painting"	Tim Hodge	Ethan Nicolle	March 25, 2016
Bob is jealous when Laura's painting gets more attention than his.
33a	65	"Ichabeezer's Granddaughter"	Bill Breneisen	Eric Branscum	March 25, 2016
Ichabeezer panics as to what to do when his granddaughter is coming to visit, so he asks Laura Carrot for help. Meanwhile, Larry pretends to be a grandpa for a day, much to the dismay of Bob.
33b	66	"Gone Lobster"	Craig George	Ethan Nicolle	March 25, 2016
Motato gets a pet lobster and it distracts him from his latest diabolical plan, so his radish minions try to take away the new pet while he isn't looking.
34a	67	"Bob Gets Glasses"	Tim Hodge	Eric Branscum	March 25, 2016
Bob tries to wear glasses to look smarter, but learns that glasses aren't what gives intelligence.
34b	68	"Crossing Guard"	Bill Breneisen	Ethan Nicolle	March 25, 2016
Larry gets bossy when he becomes the new crossing guard while Jimmy and Jerry take drastic measures to get an empty bottle unstuck from Bob's nose.
35a	69	"Glued at the Hip"	Craig George	Eric Branscum	March 25, 2016
Misinterpeting a Bible verse, Larry glues himself and Bob together, causing hilarity and chaos to ensue on their venture to get unstuck.
35b	70	"The Action Figure"	Tim Hodge	Eric Branscum	March 25, 2016
Bob, Larry, Jimmy, and Jerry must learn to share when they all want to play with a new action figure.
36a	71	"The Lost Tooth"	Bill Breneisen	Ethan Nicolle	March 25, 2016
When Larry loses his prized one and only tooth, he seeks Madame Blueberry's somewhat unorthodox detective skills to solve the case.
36b	72	"The Companion Ship"	Craig George	Eric Branscum	March 25, 2016
Larry's laziness causes himself and Bob to almost sink in their new boat, and then things go from bad to worse when they're both kidnapped by pirates!
37a	73	"JimmyBoy"	Tim Hodge	Ethan Nicolle	March 25, 2016
When Jimmy steals LarryBoy's identity, LarryBoy tries to claim it back.
37b	74	"The Larry Express"	Bill Breneisen	Eric Branscum	March 25, 2016
Larry uses his imagination to have a western train ride adventure.
38a	75	"Larry Lives It Up!"	Craig George	Ethan Nicolle	March 25, 2016
Mayor Archibald dubs Larry Mayor for a day and Larry lets the new power go to his head, causing many problems. Meanwhile, Mayor Archibald tries to enjoy his time off by golfing.
38b	76	"Petunia’s Not Funny"	Tim Hodge	Eric Branscum	March 25, 2016
Bob, Larry, and the group try to gently break the news to Petunia that she isn't funny.
39a	77	"The Big Secret"	Bill Breneisen	Ethan Nicolle	March 25, 2016
LarryBoy becomes suspicious when his fellow superheroes are keeping something from him.
39b	78	"Madame’s Soccer Skills"	Craig George	Eric Branscum	March 25, 2016
Madame Blueberry inadvertently tries out for soccer and learns a lesson about putting in good effort.

=== Season 4 (2016) ===
No. overall	Segment No.	Title	Directed by	Written by	Original release date
40a	79	"Chef Larry"	Tim Hodge	Ethan Nicolle	September 23, 2016
Larry tries his invisible hands at becoming a chef for dinner parties, despite the fact that he can't cook. He gets Bob to do all the cooking instead, and then takes all the credit.
40b	80	"Lost in the Woods"	Bill Breneisen	Eric Branscum	September 23, 2016
Bob and Larry take Mayor Archibald on a camping trip, but things go sour fast as they all forget the way home.
41a	81	"Shrink-abeezer"	Craig George	Ethan Nicolle	September 23, 2016
Motato creates a shrink ray, and inadvertently fires it at Ichabeezer.
41b	82	"Motato is My Neighbor"	Tim Hodge	Eric Branscum	September 23, 2016
When his radish minions kick him out, Motato finds a new home living next to Ichabeezer.
42a	83	"Invisible Arm Wrestling"	Bill Breneisen	Eric Branscum	September 23, 2016
Larry tells lies about being the greatest arm wrestler in the universe, which gets him into a lot of mischief. Meanwhile, Pa Grape trains Tina to become a great arm wrestler.
42b	84	"Silly No More"	Craig George	Eric Branscum	September 23, 2016
Madame Blueberry dubs Larry as "too silly" for tea and crumpets, so he goes out of his way to become a very serious cucumber.
43a	85	"Stunt Driving School"	Tim Hodge	Eric Branscum	September 23, 2016
When a new stunt ramp is installed in the town, all the veggies rush to get their stunt drivers' licenses.
43b	86	"Off the Rails"	Bill Breneisen	Eric Branscum	September 23, 2016
Bob wants a vacation from being the town train conductor, so he has to assign a temporary conductor while he's gone.
44a	87	"Jimmy and Jerry's Big Mess"	Craig George	Ethan Nicolle	September 23, 2016
Jimmy and Jerry's house becomes too cluttered and messy to live in, so they go around town trying to move into other veggies' homes.
44b	88	"Beatbox Bill"	Tim Hodge	Ethan Nicolle	September 23, 2016
Bacon Bill becomes a musical sensation, but accidentally leaves Larry in the dust of his popularity.
45a	89	"Larry the Sleepwalker"	Bill Breneisen	Eric Branscum	September 23, 2016
When Bob is tired of Larry squeaking a rubber ducky in his sleep, he throws it away, causing Larry to sleepwalk after the toy.
45b	90	"The Case of the Missing Monocle"	Craig George	Ethan Nicolle	September 23, 2016
Mayor Archibald hires detective Madame Blueberry and her detective-in-training, Larry, to help him find his lost monocle. All the while, Madame learns a lesson from Larry.
46a	91	"Larry Gets a Bulldozer"	Tim Hodge	Greg Castle	September 23, 2016
When Larry is given a big bulldozer, he uses it to try and impress his friends to extreme measures.
46b	92	"Bird on the Loose"	Bill Breneisen	Eric Branscum	September 23, 2016
Larry steals a wild bird from its natural habitat, despite stern warnings from Bob.
47a	93	"Leader of the Team"	Craig George	Eric Branscum	September 23, 2016
Bob wants to join the town's league of superheroes, but LarryBoy isn't so sure Bob has what it takes.
47b	94	"Tina's the Boss"	Tim Hodge	Eric Branscum	September 23, 2016
Tina starts her own volunteer fire department, but doesn't take the job seriously.
48a	95	"The Puppy"	Bill Breneisen	Eric Branscum	September 23, 2016
When Ichabeezer and Rooney find a stray olive dog puppy, Rooney becomes jealous of all the attention the newcomer is getting.
48b	96	"Larry's Cousin Comes to Town"	Craig George	Ethan Nicolle	September 23, 2016
Larry's cousin George comes for a visit, but all the attention being focused on his cousin makes him feel insecure.
49a	97	"The Bob and Larry Show"	Tim Hodge	Eric Branscum	September 23, 2016
Bob and Larry start making a TV show together, but things start to put a damper on their friendship.
49b	98	"Save the Cherry Cat"	Bill Breneisen	Ethan Nicolle	September 23, 2016
Larry agrees to watch Granny's cat while she's away, but doesn't listen to the directions given to him.
50a	99	"VeggieCards!"	Craig George	Greg Castle	September 23, 2016
Larry starts making collectible cards of all his friends, but Bob becomes self-conscious when his cards don't appear very popular.
50b	100	"Grow-tato"	Tim Hodge	Eric Branscum	September 23, 2016
Motato gets his shrink ray reworked into a grow ray and grows himself to a massive size, wreaking havoc on the town. Meanwhile, Bob and Larry have to learn to work together to stop the overgrown veggie.
51a	101	"The Good Samaricumber"	Bill Breneisen	Ethan Nicolle	September 23, 2016
When LarryBoy rejects the cries of help from Takeasaurus, Pa Grape sits LarryBoy down and tells him the story of the Good Samaritan. Meanwhile, Ichabeezer gets a flat tire but no one will help him.
51b	102	"Destination: SPACE STATION!"	Craig George	Eric Branscum	September 23, 2016
Bob and Larry are building a rocket ship to go to space, but Larry grows impatient and buys one online with disastrous results.
52a	103	"The Big Race"	Tim Hodge	Eric Branscum	September 23, 2016
When Bob holds a Bible lesson entitled "The Big Race", the veggies confuse it for an actual race and go racing instead of listening to Bob's lesson.
52b	104	"Yambot"	Bill Breneisen	Greg Castle	September 23, 2016
When Motato takes a vacation on Ichabeezer's lawn and refuses to move, Ichabeezer fights fire with fire by hiring a Yambot to get rid of Motato.
