= List of Xavier Riddle and the Secret Museum episodes =

Xavier Riddle and the Secret Museum is an animated children's television series that premiered on November 11, 2019, on PBS Kids. The series is produced by 9 Story Media Group. It is based on the children's book series written by Brad Meltzer and Chris Eliopoulos, named Ordinary People Change the World. The series involves Xavier Riddle with his sister Yadina, and their friends Brad and Berby, at the Secret Museum, and help from historical heroes, who are depicted in the series as children.

== Series overview ==
Season	Episodes	Originally released	
Season	Episodes	First released	Last released
1	37	November 11, 2019	January 31, 2022
2	24	January 15, 2024	January 12, 2026

Each episode of Xavier Riddle and the Secret Museum runs for half an hour. They consist of two 11-minute stories based on famous historical heroes around the world in the past. However, airings on streaming services such as Globoplay in Brazil split the episodes into segments, with each 11-minute story isolated. There may be an interstitial segment between the two main stories, in which Berby, and either Xavier, Yadina, Brad, or Dr. Zoom, are shown doing something fun together.

== Episodes ==
=== Season 1 (2019–22) ===
No. overall	No. in season	Title	Directed by	Written by	Original release date	Prod. code
1	1	"I Am Johann Sebastian Bach"	Cory Bobiak	Written by : Jennifer Daley; Storyboarded by : Cory Bobiak Written by : Amy Brown; Storyboarded by : Firas Momani	November 11, 2019	101
1	1	"I Am Marie Curie"	Cory Bobiak	Written by : Jennifer Daley; Storyboarded by : Cory Bobiak Written by : Amy Brown; Storyboarded by : Firas Momani	November 11, 2019	101
2	2	"I Am Mary Shelley"	Cory Bobiak	Written by : Meghan Read; Storyboarded by : Craig Taillefer Written by : Desmond Sargeant; Storyboarded by : Hong Qi	November 12, 2019	118
2	2	"I Am Harry Houdini"	Cory Bobiak	Written by : Meghan Read; Storyboarded by : Craig Taillefer Written by : Desmond Sargeant; Storyboarded by : Hong Qi	November 12, 2019	118
3	3	"I Am George Washington"	Cory Bobiak	Written by : Jennifer Daley; Storyboarded by : Cory Bobiak Written by : Jennifer Daley; Storyboarded by : Firas Momani	November 13, 2019	116
3	3	"I Am Susan B. Anthony"	Cory Bobiak	Written by : Jennifer Daley; Storyboarded by : Cory Bobiak Written by : Jennifer Daley; Storyboarded by : Firas Momani	November 13, 2019	116
4	4	"I Am Isaac Newton"	Cory Bobiak	Written by : Amy Brown; Storyboarded by : Alex Greychuck Written by : Amy Brown; Storyboarded by : Lisa Kathofer	November 18, 2019	103
4	4	"I Am Golda Meir"	Cory Bobiak	Written by : Amy Brown; Storyboarded by : Alex Greychuck Written by : Amy Brown; Storyboarded by : Lisa Kathofer	November 18, 2019	103
5	5	"I Am Winston Churchill"	Cory Bobiak	Written by : Jiro C. Okada; Storyboarded by : Alex Greychuck Written by : Lakna Edilima; Storyboarded by : Firas Momani	November 19, 2019	107
5	5	"I Am Cleopatra"	Cory Bobiak	Written by : Jiro C. Okada; Storyboarded by : Alex Greychuck Written by : Lakna Edilima; Storyboarded by : Firas Momani	November 19, 2019	107
6	6	"I Am Catherine the Great"	Cory Bobiak	Written by : Jiro C. Okada; Storyboarded by : Sean Janisse Written by : Meghan Read; Storyboarded by : Stephanie Ramone	November 20, 2019	108
6	6	"I Am Tomioka Tessai"	Cory Bobiak	Written by : Jiro C. Okada; Storyboarded by : Sean Janisse Written by : Meghan Read; Storyboarded by : Stephanie Ramone	November 20, 2019	108
7	7	"We Are The Wright Brothers"	Cory Bobiak	Written by : Desmond Sargeant; Storyboarded by : Lisa Kathofer Written by : Jennifer Daley; Storyboarded by : Sean Janisse	November 27, 2019	111
7	7	"We Are The Brontë Sisters"	Cory Bobiak	Written by : Desmond Sargeant; Storyboarded by : Lisa Kathofer Written by : Jennifer Daley; Storyboarded by : Sean Janisse	November 27, 2019	111
8	8	"I Am Mark Twain"	Cory Bobiak	Written by : Charles Johnston; Storyboarded by : Stephanie Ramone Written by : Charles Johnston; Storyboarded by : Tom Cho	November 27, 2019	112
8	8	"I Am Abigail Adams"	Cory Bobiak	Written by : Charles Johnston; Storyboarded by : Stephanie Ramone Written by : Charles Johnston; Storyboarded by : Tom Cho	November 27, 2019	112
9	9	"I Am Julia Child"	Cory Bobiak	Written by : Jennifer Daley; Storyboarded by : Lisa Kathofer Written by : Jiro C. Okada; Storyboarded by : Sean Janisse	November 27, 2019	113
9	9	"I Am Neil Armstrong"	Cory Bobiak	Written by : Jennifer Daley; Storyboarded by : Lisa Kathofer Written by : Jiro C. Okada; Storyboarded by : Sean Janisse	November 27, 2019	113
10	10	"I Am Helen Keller"	Cory Bobiak	Written by : Meghan Read; Storyboarded by : Alex Greychuck Written by : Lakna Edilima; Storyboarded by : Firas Momani	December 2, 2019	103
10	10	"I Am Alexander Graham Bell"	Cory Bobiak	Written by : Meghan Read; Storyboarded by : Alex Greychuck Written by : Lakna Edilima; Storyboarded by : Firas Momani	December 2, 2019	103
11	11	"I Am Florence Nightingale"	Cory Bobiak	Written by : Charles Johnston; Storyboarded by : Sean Janisse Written by : Jiro C. Okada; Storyboarded by : Craig Taillefer	December 9, 2019	102
11	11	"I Am George Washington Carver"	Cory Bobiak	Written by : Charles Johnston; Storyboarded by : Sean Janisse Written by : Jiro C. Okada; Storyboarded by : Craig Taillefer	December 9, 2019	102
12	12	"I Am Leonardo da Vinci"	Cory Bobiak	Written by : Charles Johnston; Storyboarded by : Alex Greychuck Written by : Jennifer Daley; Storyboarded by : Firas Momani	December 16, 2019	105
12	12	"I Am Amelia Earhart"	Cory Bobiak	Written by : Charles Johnston; Storyboarded by : Alex Greychuck Written by : Jennifer Daley; Storyboarded by : Firas Momani	December 16, 2019	105
13	13	"I Am Zora Neale Hurston"	Cory Bobiak	Written by : Charles Johnston; Storyboarded by : Sean Janisse Written by : Jennifer Daley; Storyboarded by : Stephanie Ramone	December 23, 2019	116
13	13	"I Am Charles Dickens"	Cory Bobiak	Written by : Charles Johnston; Storyboarded by : Sean Janisse Written by : Jennifer Daley; Storyboarded by : Stephanie Ramone	December 23, 2019	116
14	14	"I Am Jackie Robinson"	Cory Bobiak	Written by : Desmond Sargeant Written by : Amy Brown	January 20, 2020	114
14	14	"I Am Anna Pavlova"	Cory Bobiak	Written by : Desmond Sargeant Written by : Amy Brown	January 20, 2020	114
15	15	"I Am Mary Leakey"	Cory Bobiak	Written by : Lakna Edilima Written by : Lakna Edilima	January 21, 2020	115
15	15	"I Am Alexander Hamilton"	Cory Bobiak	Written by : Lakna Edilima Written by : Lakna Edilima	January 21, 2020	115
16	16	"I Am Theodore Roosevelt"	Cory Bobiak	Written by : Amy Brown Written by : Jennifer Daley	January 22, 2020	116
16	16	"I Am Eleanor Roosevelt"	Cory Bobiak	Written by : Amy Brown Written by : Jennifer Daley	January 22, 2020	116
17	17	"I Am Lou Gehrig"	Cory Bobiak	Written By : Lakna Edilima Written By : Jennifer Daley	January 23, 2020	117
17	17	"I Am Marie Owens"	Cory Bobiak	Written By : Lakna Edilima Written By : Jennifer Daley	January 23, 2020	117
18	18	"I Am Nikola Tesla"	Cory Bobiak	Written by : Meghan Read	August 3, 2020	119
18	18	"I Am Nellie Bly"	Cory Bobiak	Written by : Meghan Read	August 3, 2020	119
19	19	"I Am Maya Angelou"	Cory Bobiak	Written by : Desmond Sargeant Written by : Lakna Edilima	August 4, 2020	120
19	19	"I Am Frederick Douglass"	Cory Bobiak	Written by : Desmond Sargeant Written by : Lakna Edilima	August 4, 2020	120
20	20	"I Am Louis Pasteur"	Cory Bobiak	Written by : Charles Johnston Written by : Amy Brown	August 5, 2020	121
20	20	"I Am Rachel Carson"	Cory Bobiak	Written by : Charles Johnston Written by : Amy Brown	August 5, 2020	121
21	21	"I Am Kate Warne"	Cory Bobiak	Written by : Meghan Read + Jen Daley Written by : Jen Daley	August 6, 2020	122
21	21	"I Am Sir Arthur Conan Doyle"	Cory Bobiak	Written by : Meghan Read + Jen Daley Written by : Jen Daley	August 6, 2020	122
22	22	"I Am Cesar Chavez (Note: Episode pulled off the air due to the Cesar Chavez allegations coming to light on March 2026)"	Cory Bobiak	Written by : M.R Horhager Lakna Edilima; Storyboarded by : Meghan Read	October 5, 2020	121
22	22	"I Am Dolores Huerta (Note: Pulled off the air due to being paired with "I Am Cesar Chavez")"	Cory Bobiak	Written by : M.R Horhager Lakna Edilima; Storyboarded by : Meghan Read	October 5, 2020	121
23	23	"I Am Confucius"	Cory Bobiak	Written by : Charles Johnston Lakna Edilima	October 6, 2020	125
23	23	"I Am Sacagawea"	Cory Bobiak	Written by : Charles Johnston Lakna Edilima	October 6, 2020	125
24	24	"I Am Mary Anning"	Cory Bobiak	Written by : Amy Brown Written by : Charles Johnston	October 7, 2020	124
24	24	"I Am Charlie Chaplin"	Cory Bobiak	Written by : Amy Brown Written by : Charles Johnston	October 7, 2020	124
25	25	"I Am Billie Jean King"	Logan McNeil	Written by : Jennifer Daley Written by : Deamond Sargeant	October 8, 2020	128
25	25	"I Am Arthur Ashe"	Logan McNeil	Written by : Jennifer Daley Written by : Deamond Sargeant	October 8, 2020	128
26	26	"I Am Rosa Parks"	Cory Bobiak	Written by : Desmond Sargeant Written By : Charles Johnston	October 9, 2020	126
26	26	"I Am Thurgood Marshall"	Cory Bobiak	Written by : Desmond Sargeant Written By : Charles Johnston	October 9, 2020	126
27	27	"I Am Harriet Tubman"	Cory Bobiak	Written By : Meghan Read and Desmond Sargeant	October 12, 2020	127
28	28	"I Am Wilma Rudolph"	Cory Bobiak	Written By : Amy Brown Written By : Meghan Read	February 1, 2021	124
28	28	"I Am Jonas Salk"	Cory Bobiak	Written By : Amy Brown Written By : Meghan Read	February 1, 2021	124
29	29	"I Am Jesse Owens"	Logan McNeil	Written By : Desmond Sargeant Written By : Charles Johnston	February 2, 2021	135
29	29	"I Am Ella Fitzgerald"	Logan McNeil	Written By : Desmond Sargeant Written By : Charles Johnston	February 2, 2021	135
30	30	"I Am James Naismith"	Logan McNeil	Written By : Desmond Sargeant Written By : Charles Johnston	April 5, 2021	129
30	30	"I Am Temple Grandin"	Logan McNeil	Written By : Desmond Sargeant Written By : Charles Johnston	April 5, 2021	129
31	31	"I Am Albert Einstein"	Logan McNeil	Written By : Meghan Read Written By : Jennifer Daley	April 6, 2021	130
31	31	"I Am Carol Burnett"	Logan McNeil	Written By : Meghan Read Written By : Jennifer Daley	April 6, 2021	130
32	32	"I Am Abraham Lincoln"	Logan McNeil	Written By : Meghan Read Written By : Amy Brown	April 7, 2021	131
32	32	"I Am Jane Jacobs"	Logan McNeil	Written By : Meghan Read Written By : Amy Brown	April 7, 2021	131
33	33	"I Am Edmund Hillary"	Logan McNeil	Written By : Charles Johnston Written By : Lakna Edilima	April 8, 2021	132
33	33	"I Am Celia Cruz"	Logan McNeil	Written By : Charles Johnston Written By : Lakna Edilima	April 8, 2021	132
34	34	"I Am Jigonsaseh"	Logan McNeil	Written By : Millie Knapp Written By : Lakna Edilima	November 1, 2021	136
34	34	"I Am Sacagawea"	Logan McNeil	Written By : Millie Knapp Written By : Lakna Edilima	November 1, 2021	136
35	35	"I Am Ibn Battuta"	Logan McNeil	Written By : Gillian Muller Written By : Amy Brown	November 2, 2021	134
35	35	"I Am Beulah Louise Henry"	Logan McNeil	Written By : Gillian Muller Written By : Amy Brown	November 2, 2021	134
36	36	"I Am Rukmini Devi"	Logan McNeil	Written By : Lakna Edilima Written By : Meghan Read	January 14, 2022	133
36	36	"I Am Bob Ross"	Logan McNeil	Written By : Lakna Edilima Written By : Meghan Read	January 14, 2022	133
37	37	"I Am Fred Rogers"	Logan McNeil	Written By : Meghan Read	January 31, 2022	137

=== Season 2 (2024–26) ===
No. overall	No. in season	Title	Directed by	Written by	Original release date	Prod. code
38	1	"I Am Michelangelo"	Hong Qi	Written By : Charles Johnston Written By : Gillian Muller	January 15, 2024	201
38	1	"I Am Dorothy Levitt"	Hong Qi	Written By : Charles Johnston Written By : Gillian Muller	January 15, 2024	201
39	2	"I Am Bessie Coleman"	Hong Qi	Written By : Lindsey Addawoo Written By : Jiro C. Okada	January 16, 2024	202
39	2	"I Am King Sejong the Great"	Hong Qi	Written By : Lindsey Addawoo Written By : Jiro C. Okada	January 16, 2024	202
40	3	"I Am Eugenie Clark"	Hong Qi	Written By : Meaghan Read Written By : Ashley Hafal & Amy Brown	January 17, 2024	203
40	3	"I Am Benjamin Banneker"	Hong Qi	Written By : Meaghan Read Written By : Ashley Hafal & Amy Brown	January 17, 2024	203
41	4	"I Am Ruth Bader Ginsburg"	Hong Qi	Written By : Amy Brown	January 18, 2024	204
42	5	"I Am Grandmaster Flash"	Hong Qi	Written By : Desmond Sargeant Written By : Ashley Hafal & Amy Brown	January 19, 2024	205
42	5	"I Am Mary Seacole"	Hong Qi	Written By : Desmond Sargeant Written By : Ashley Hafal & Amy Brown	January 19, 2024	205
43	6	"I Am Hedy Lamarr"	Hong Qi	Written By : Charles Johnston Written By : M.R. Horhager	January 22, 2024	206
43	6	"I Am Archimedes"	Hong Qi	Written By : Charles Johnston Written By : M.R. Horhager	January 22, 2024	206
44	7	"I Am James Braidwood"	Hong Qi	Written By : Desmond Sargeant Written By : Jiro C. Okada	January 23, 2024	207
44	7	"I Am Queen Liliʻuokalani"	Hong Qi	Written By : Desmond Sargeant Written By : Jiro C. Okada	January 23, 2024	207
45	8	"I Am Alvin Ailey"	Hong Qi	Written By : Lindsey Addawoo Written By : Jennifer Daley	January 24, 2024	208
45	8	"I Am Lucy Maud Montgomery"	Hong Qi	Written By : Lindsey Addawoo Written By : Jennifer Daley	January 24, 2024	208
46	9	"I Am Zelia Nuttall"	Hong Qi	Written By : Jennifer Daley & Alex Cabrera-Aragon Written By : Jennifer Daley	January 25, 2024	209
46	9	"I Am Jules Léotard"	Hong Qi	Written By : Jennifer Daley & Alex Cabrera-Aragon Written By : Jennifer Daley	January 25, 2024	209
47	10	"I Am Louis Braille"	Hong Qi	Written By : Amy Brown Written By : Desmond Sargeant	January 26, 2024	210
47	10	"I Am Zaha Hadid"	Hong Qi	Written By : Amy Brown Written By : Desmond Sargeant	January 26, 2024	210
48	11	"I Am Jim Thorpe"	Hong Qi	Written By : T'áncháy Redvers Written By : T'áncháy Redvers	July 15, 2024	211
48	11	"I Am Norval Morrisseau"	Hong Qi	Written By : T'áncháy Redvers Written By : T'áncháy Redvers	July 15, 2024	211
49	12	"I Am Roberto Clemente"	Hong Qi	Written By : Mike Kiss Written By : Jiro C. Okada	July 16, 2024	212
49	12	"I Am Kristi Yamaguchi"	Hong Qi	Written By : Mike Kiss Written By : Jiro C. Okada	July 16, 2024	212
50	13	"I Am Madam C.J. Walker"	Hong Qi	Written By : Lindsey Addawoo Written By : Jiro C. Okada	July 17, 2024	213
50	13	"I Am Edwin Binney"	Hong Qi	Written By : Lindsey Addawoo Written By : Jiro C. Okada	July 17, 2024	213
51	14	"I Am William Shakespeare"	Hong Qi	Written By : Jennifer Daley Written By : Jennifer Daley	September 9, 2024	214
51	14	"I Am Katherine Johnson"	Hong Qi	Written By : Jennifer Daley Written By : Jennifer Daley	September 9, 2024	214
52	15	"I Am Bruce Lee"	Hong Qi	Written By : Jenny Lee Written By : Alex Cabrera-Aragon	September 10, 2024	217
52	15	"I Am Sonia Manzano"	Hong Qi	Written By : Jenny Lee Written By : Alex Cabrera-Aragon	September 10, 2024	217
53	16	"We Are Siegel and Shuster"	Hong Qi	Written By : Lindsey Addawoo Written By : Jiro C. Okada	October 14, 2024	216
53	16	"I Am Edmonia Lewis"	Hong Qi	Written By : Lindsey Addawoo Written By : Jiro C. Okada	October 14, 2024	216
54	17	"I Am David Suzuki"	Hong Qi	Written By : Charles Johnston Written By : T'áncháy Redvers	October 15, 2024	218
54	17	"I Am Esther Martinez"	Hong Qi	Written By : Charles Johnston Written By : T'áncháy Redvers	October 15, 2024	218
55	18	"I Am Gwen Ifill"	Hong Qi	Written By : Amy Brown Written By : Desmond Sargeant	December 9, 2024	215
55	18	"I Am Matthew Henson"	Hong Qi	Written By : Amy Brown Written By : Desmond Sargeant	December 9, 2024	215
56	19	"I Am Kofi Annan"	Hong Qi	Written By : Desmond Sargeant Written By : Mike Kiss	December 10, 2024	219
56	19	"We Are William and Caroline Herschel"	Hong Qi	Written By : Desmond Sargeant Written By : Mike Kiss	December 10, 2024	219
57	20	"I Am Willard Wigan"	Hong Qi	Written By : Meghan Read & Aaron Rubinoff Written By : Jennifer Daley	February 17, 2025	221
57	20	"I Am Maria Sibylla Merian"	Hong Qi	Written By : Meghan Read & Aaron Rubinoff Written By : Jennifer Daley	February 17, 2025	221
58	21	"I Am Jackie Robinson"	Hong Qi	Written By : Meghan Read & Desmond Sargeant	February 18, 2025	223
59	22	"I Am Grace Hopper"	Hong Qi	Written By : Meghan Read Written By : Aaron Rubinoff	August 25, 2025	220
59	22	"I Am Itzhak Perlman"	Hong Qi	Written By : Meghan Read Written By : Aaron Rubinoff	August 25, 2025	220
60	23	"I Am Ravi Shankar"	Hong Qi	Written By : Charles Johnston & Mathew Jacob Written By : Amy Brown	August 26, 2025	222
60	23	"I Am Babe Didrikson Zaharias"	Hong Qi	Written By : Charles Johnston & Mathew Jacob Written By : Amy Brown	August 26, 2025	222
61	24	"I Am Full of Possibilities"	Hong Qi	Written By : Meghan Read	January 12, 2026	224

=== Shorts (2022) ===
No.	Title	Directed by	Original release date
1	"Puzzled"	Unknown	July 11, 2022
Brad revisits Marie Curie. Virtue: Perseverance
2	"Happy Birthday"	Unknown	July 11, 2022
Yadina revisits Confucius. Virtue: Compassion
3	"Fair and Square"	Unknown	July 11, 2022
Xavier revisits Abraham Lincoln. Virtue: Honesty
4	"Stand Up"	Unknown	July 11, 2022
Yadina and Brad revisit Harriet Tubman. Virtue: Courage
5	"Shell Shocked"	Unknown	July 11, 2022
Xavier revisits George Washington Carver. Virtue: Responsibility
6	"The Duet"	Unknown	July 11, 2022
Yadina revisits Abigail Adams. Virtue: Grateful
7	"Dreidel"	Unknown	July 11, 2022
Xavier and Yadina revisit Frederick Douglass. Virtue: Curiosity
8	"Play Ball"	Unknown	July 11, 2022
Xavier, Yadina, and Brad revisit Sacagawea. Virtue: Creativity

== Special (2020) ==
No.	Title	Directed by	Written by	Original release date	Prod. code
1	"Xavier Riddle and the Secret Movie: I Am Madam President"	Unknown	Unknown	March 16, 2020	TBA
In the special, Yadina, who dreams of becoming president of the United States one day, realizes all the presidents were men. She questions if she can still be president, even though it is something no girl has done yet. The trio visit the Secret Museum, where a five-part star is shown to them. They travel to different periods in time, where they meet women who are attempting to do something that has never been done before. Yadina learns from them on what is needed to do something that has never been done before, as she attempts to complete the star. She meets Jackie Joyner-Kersee, Amelia Earhart, Junko Tabei, Sally Ride and herself as an adult. As an adult, she is shown as president. Amelia Earhart is the only historical figure to be featured in both the special and an episode.
