= A VeggieTales Movie =

A VeggieTales Movie may refer to:

- Jonah: A VeggieTales Movie (2002)
- The Pirates Who Don't Do Anything: A VeggieTales Movie (2008)
