= The Star of Christmas =

- 2002 DVD Cover
- Directed by: Tim Hodge
- Written by: Phil Vischer
- Produced by: David Pitts
- Starring: Phil Vischer; Mike Nawrocki; Jacquelyn Ritz; Lisa Vischer; Dan Anderson; Jim Poole; Tim Hodge; Mike Sage
- Music by: Kurt Heinecke; Christopher Davis
- Production company: Big Idea Productions
- Distributed by: Warner Home Video (US); Word Entertainment
- Release date: October 26, 2002
- Running time: 48 minutes
- Language: English

The Star of Christmas is the 2002 American animated eighteenth episode of the VeggieTales series and its second holiday special. It was released on October 26, 2002 and re-released on October 5, 2004, in Holiday Double Feature with its earlier episode The Toy that Saved Christmas. Like the other holiday episodes, it has no usual ”A Lesson in...” subtitle and the countertops. The film's message is that the true Star of Christmas is Jesus Christ. The movie emphasizes that the tale of Jesus Christ's birth is the epitome of real love and should, therefore, serve as society's model for how to love others.

The Star of Christmas centers on two would-be operatic composers who are based on W. S. Gilbert and Arthur Sullivan. VeggieTales has spoofed Gilbert and Sullivan's work in Lyle the Kindly Viking and (specifically The Mikado) in Sumo of the Opera. In this episode however they spoof the people, Gilbert, Sullivan and themselves.

The episode was nominated for an Annie Award in 2002 in the category of Outstanding Achievement in an Animated Home Video Production, but lost to Rolie Polie Olie: The Great Defender of Fun.

== Plot ==
The episode is set in London. Cavis Appythart (Bob the Tomato) and Millward Phelps (Larry the Cucumber) are jingle writers who decide to take their big break into the musical theatre. While Millward is content to see their work featured on billboards and in newspapers, Cavis believes they can make a difference in crime-ridden London by staging a grand musical that will move the citizens to greater expressions of love. Their opportunity arises when Millward's Uncle Ebenezer Nezzer grants them the use of his theater on Christmas Eve. They plan the huge production of a new musical called "The Princess and the Plumber". However, with only three days left until Christmas Eve, they still need a script. Seymour Schwenk (Pa Grape), their friend and an inventor, shows up in an experimental rocket car and delivers a box of light bulbs to them. Cavis maintains that if their production is glitzy and bright (electric lights are still a novelty at this time and were first introduced at the Savoy Theatre for Gilbert and Sullivan's Patience) then their show will be a bigger hit and reach more people. He plans to integrate the lights directly into the scenery itself.

Cavis and Millward also need to convince the city's premiere talent, Constance Effie Pickering (Madame Blueberry), to star in the lead role, and they need to get a commitment from Prince Calvin Fredrick (Mr. Lunt) to attend the premiere. While Cavis and his assistant Bob Winston (Jean-Claude Pea) work on Pickering and the Prince, Millward works to complete the script. Everything eventually starts coming together, and Cavis starts feeling confident that their production will be a huge success. After noticing a flyer for a Christmas pageant planned to occur on the same night at a local church, Cavis goes to investigate. He observes Edmund Gilbert (Junior Asparagus) preparing a low-budget children's play, and concludes that it poses no threat to their production. However, the pageant intends to feature an object called the Star of Christmas. Wondering aloud about this as he leaves the church, Cavis is overheard by Arthur Hollingshead (Archibald Asparagus), a historian who reveals that the Star of Christmas is an ancient relic that has not been publicly displayed for 79 years. He rushes off with great excitement to report the news, which promptly makes the front-page headlines the next morning.

Faced with the prospect of losing their audience, and in particular the Prince, to the church pageant, Cavis and Millward wish to make their own production greater and flashier, and in desperation sneak into the church to steal the star. They are caught, however, and narrowly escape from the aged Moyer the Destroyer (Scooter) who was left to guard the relic. With the star and the flashy lights, Cavis is certain that "The Princess and the Plumber" is now a guaranteed success. But during dress rehearsal, the excessive number of lights, which Seymour had warned were a fire hazard, ignite the curtains. The theater goes up in flames, taking with it the Star of Christmas. As Cavis and Millward mope over this terrible turn of events, Constable Dwiglight Howarde (Jerry Gourd) arrives with Moyer to arrest them for stealing the star. In the jail, they meet a prisoner, Charles Pincher, who laughs at their efforts to spread love by means of an elaborate stage production. He claims that real love makes sacrifices to help others without expecting anything in return and is extremely rare.

As if on cue, Edmund and his father, Reverend Gilbert (Dad Asparagus), arrive at the jail to release Cavis and Millward, having chosen out of love not to press charges for the theft of the star. Cavis is moved, and he expresses his desire to attend the pageant. However, the pageant is scheduled to start in ten minutes and there is not enough time to walk there. Just then, Seymour arrives in his rocket car. He entrusts Millward to drive the vehicle and try to get them all to the church on time. After a harrowing ride fraught with collisions and near-misses, Cavis, Millward, Edmund, and Reverend Gilbert arrive at the church just as the pageant is about to start.

The pageant is a success, with Prince Calvin and Miss Pickering in attendance. Cavis finally learns that Christmas is not about glitz and grand productions, but about a baby in a manger, Jesus, who is the Star of Christmas. After the pageant, Ebenezer chews out Cavis and Millward in regards to the theater and suggests they work in his factory to pay it off (setting the stage for the events of An Easter Carol), after which Moyer shows them that the Star of Christmas is safe and that the duo stole the Turtle of Damascus, which he claims most experts consider to be a hoax. The episode ends with Cavis and Millward performing a selfless act at last: they bring cookies and a gift to Charles Pincher in his jail cell, and Cavis says, smiling warmly, "Merry Christmas, Mr. Pincher."

== Production ==
The studio was on a tight schedule in early Christmas 2001 to get the film done. Most people slept in their offices trying to get The Star of Christmas finished. Towards the end/before it wrapped, Mike Nawrocki was said he would be on his Sunday drive around the time of New Year's Eve. They were at a café, the same café they used for the premiere of "Larryboy and the Rumor Weed". There was Lisa Vischer singing "O Come, O Come Emmanuel" during the "Star of Christmas" premiere.

== Cast of characters ==
- Phil Vischer as Cavis Appythart (Bob the Tomato), Seymour Schwenk (Pa Grape), Geoffrey (Jimmy Gourd), Ebenezer Nezzer, Arthur Hollingshead (Archibald Asparagus), Prince Calvin Fredrick (Mr. Lunt), Percy Pea, Phillipe Pea, Frairie Peas and Cast Members
- Mike Nawrocki as Millward Phelps (Larry the Cucumber), Winston (Jean-Claude Pea), Constable Howarde (Jerry Gourd), Frairie Peas, Stranger Pea and Cast Members
- Jacquelyn Ritz as Effie Pickering (Madame Blueberry) and Laura Carrot
- Lisa Vischer as Edmund Gilbert (Junior Asparagus)
- Dan Anderson as Reverend Gilbert (Dad Asparagus)
- Jim Poole as Moyer McGonnigal (Scooter Carrot)
- Tim Hodge as Charlie Pincher
- Shelby Vischer as Abigail (Annie)
- Matthew Hodge as Wiseman Pea
- Josh Vulcano as Angel Pea
- Mike Sage as the Tradesman (Scallion #3)

Walla Group: Ian Anderson, Adam Frick, Tim Hodge, Laura Richy, Aimee Dupriest, Peggy Heinrichsen, Julea Love and Jesse Tewson

== Songs ==
Due to the format of the show, this episode does not contain the usual "What We Have Learned" or "VeggieTales Theme". It does contain five original (short) compositions and one Christmas traditional:

- "First Big Break", sung by Cavis Appythart
- "We Are the Frarie Peas", sung by the Frarie Peas
- "Plumber, You Dropped Your Possum", sung by Millward Phelps
- "Flushing in Vain", sung by Miss Constance Effie Pickering and the Plumber
- "Plugged Up Love", sung by Miss Constance Effie Pickering, the Plumber, and the Frarie Peas
- "O Come, O Come, Emmanuel", sung by Lisa Vischer over the closing credits

== Broadcast ==
This episode of VeggieTales was distributed by American Public Television and aired on select PBS stations in 2002, with repeat broadcasts as late as 2006.

== See also ==
- List of Christmas films
