= Tim Hodge =

American animator

- Born: Timothy Hodge; April 2, 1963 (age 63); Boaz, Alabama, U.S.
- Other names: Timothy Hodge; Timm Hodge
- Occupations: Storyboard artist; animator; painter; illustrator; writer; director; voice actor
- Years active: 1993–present
- Known for: VeggieTales

Timothy Hodge (born April 2, 1963) is an American storyboard artist, animator, painter, illustrator, writer, director, and voice actor based in Nashville, Tennessee. He is best known for his work at Big Idea Entertainment, where he was a writer, director, animator, and voice actor on the Christian video series VeggieTales, as well as other animated projects like 3-2-1 Penguins!.

== Biography ==
Hodge became interested in film-making while he was in 7th grade when he stumbled upon his dad's 8 mm camera and spent his summer making short films using clay and other materials. Hodge later went on to attend Oral Roberts University in Tulsa, Oklahoma. He got his first job in animation at the then-current/now-defunct Willming-Reams Animation studio in San Antonio, Texas, where he drew animated television commercials for seven years, at the same time studying at the San Antonio Art Institute.

He later joined the Walt Disney Feature Animation studio located at the Disney/MGM Studios theme park in Orlando, Florida. While at Disney, he also worked as story artist on films like Mulan, John Henry for Disney's American Legends video and Brother Bear.

It was in 2000 that he took his family and moved north to Chicago, Illinois to join the studios of Big Idea Productions at the Yorktown Center mall and started working in computer animation. Hodge's directorial debut at Big Idea, Lyle the Kindly Viking, won the Best Direct To Video Animated Release at the 2001 World Animation Celebration. He was nominated for an Annie Award for Best Vocal Performance in 2003 for his role as Khalil in Jonah: A VeggieTales Movie.

Hodge won 1st Runner-up for his live-action short film Soccer Mom Detective in 2008.

He currently resides in Franklin, Tennessee.

== Filmography ==
- Roger Rabbit: Trail Mix-Up (1993) - in between artist
- The Lion King (1994) - breakdown animator: Young Simba
- Circle of Life: An Environmental Fable (1995) - animator
- Pocahontas (1995) - animation assistant
- Mulan (1998) - story
- John Henry (2000) - story supervisor, voice of MacTavish
- VeggieTales (2000–2014) - director, producer, writer, storyboard artist, additional voices
- 3-2-1 Penguins! (2000–02, 2007–08) - executive producer, director, writer, concept artist
- Jonah: A VeggieTales Movie (2002) - head of story, voice of Khalil; Nominated - Annie Award for Voice Acting in a Feature Production
- Brother Bear (2003) - additional story
- The Pirates Who Don't Do Anything (2008) - lead storyboard artist, voice of Jolly Joe
- Time & Chance (2008) - director, producer, writer, editor
- Soccer Mom Detective (2008) - director, producer, writer
- VeggieTales in the House (2014–2016) - director
- VeggieTales in the City (2017) - director
- The Dead Sea Squirrels (2025) - character design, storyboard artist
