= List of VeggieTales videos =

Episode List for an American Christian animated series

The series' former logo used from 2010 to 2014

This is a list of VHS and DVD releases of the animated children's television series VeggieTales.

== Videos ==
=== Original videos (1993–2015) ===
No.	Title	Original release date
The 1990s
1	"Where's God When I'm S-Scared?"	December 23, 1993 (earliest known release date)
This video features two stories about what to do when you are afraid. In the first segment, Junior Asparagus is watching a Frankencelery movie before being told by his mom that he needs to go to bed and says the movie is too scary for him. Junior denies this as he goes upstairs, but when he imagines his family portrait is full of monsters, he runs to his room scared. However, Bob and Larry drop in and comfort Junior in a song about how he does not need to be afraid because God is watching out for him and He is bigger than anything. Junior is then confronted by Frankencelery, who reveals that he is merely an actor named Phil Winklestein from Toledo. Junior is convinced and sings that "God is bigger". After Bob, Larry, and Frankencelery leave, Junior's dad comes to tuck Junior in. The pair then discuss how God takes care of them, that Junior needs to be more careful about what he watches in the future, and it's okay to tell his parents if he's scared. This segment was written and directed by Phil Vischer. Vischer also serves as the animator of this segment, along with Robert Ellis and Chris Olsen. The second segment is an adaptation of the biblical story of Daniel in the lions' den from the Book of Daniel, King Darius (Archibald Asparagus) is in his court with his Wisemen (The Scallions) when he confides that he has had a dream and wants help with what it means. The Wisemen cannot figure out the answer, but Daniel (Larry the Cucumber) arrives and correctly interprets the dream. Impressed, King Darius then promotes Daniel as his second-in-command. However, the Wisemen become envious and trick King Darius into creating a law that says his subjects can only pray to him. Soon after, the Wisemen catch Daniel praying to God and throw him into the lions' den in accordance with the law. Daniel hears the lions and is afraid, but an angel comforts him reminding him that God is with him. Meanwhile, the Wisemen celebrate their supposed victory. King Darius, however, spends a restless night praying that Daniel's God is protecting him. The next morning, King Darius runs to the lions' den and finds Daniel alive and well. King Darius changes the law so that everybody must pray only to Daniel's God and turns to punish the Wisemen who flee to Egypt. This segment was also written and directed by Phil Vischer, and was also animated by Robert Ellis and Chris Olsen. Silly Song: "The Water Buffalo Song"
2	"God Wants Me to Forgive Them!?!"	August 23, 1994
This video features two short stories about forgiveness. In the first segment, Pa Grape is the father of a family of cranky grapes, the Grapes of Wrath, who regularly name-call and insult others and each other. Upon crashing into a tree stump, the family gets out of their truck and begins to tease Junior Asparagus about his appearance. Junior is then rescued by his dad who explains to the Grapes that it is not nice to pick on people, and Junior forgives them at his dad's urging. But afterwards, the Grapes see Junior flying into the sandbox and laugh. Junior is reluctant to forgive them again, so Bob and Larry try to figure out how many times one should forgive and Qwerty shows the verse, Matthew 18:22 "Jesus answered 'I tell you not seven times, but seventy times seven.' When Rosie figures out that seventy times seven equals 490, the Grapes ask for Junior's forgiveness and the Grapes of Wrath are renamed "The Grapes of Math". The second segment is a loose parody of famous American sitcom Gilligan's Island. In the segment, Larry daydreams, causing a boat filled with passengers (Skipper Bob (Bob the Tomato), the Professor (Dad Asparagus), the millionaire (Archibald Asparagus) and his wife (Lovey Asparagus)) to crash on a remote island. Due to this accident, the passengers hold a grudge against Larry, despite his attempts to apologize, which saddens him into running away. However, Bob realizes the error of their ways and the group forgives Larry for stranding them. A palm tree named Palmy appears and congratulates everyone for their forgiveness, reminding them of how important it is. The shipmates are finally able to escape the island on a helicopter cobbled together by the Professor (Dad Asparagus). Transition Segment: "The Forgive-O-Matic"
3	"Are You My Neighbor?"	March 28, 1995
This video features two short stories about loving those who are different. In the first story, which is an adaptation of the Parable of the Good Samaritan from the Gospel of Luke in the style of Dr. Seuss, Larry the Cucumber lives in Flibber-o-loo, where everybody wears shoes on their heads. Junior Asparagus lives in Jibber-de-Lot where everyone wears pots on their heads. For days, the two cities have flung headgear at each other over a disagreement on whose is best. Upon leaving, Larry is attacked by the bandits (The Scallions), who rob and leave him upside down in a hole. Both the mayor of Flibber-o-loo (Archibald Asparagus) and a Flibbian doctor (Lovey Asparagus) come upon Larry, but claim to be too busy to help. Soon after, Junior comes along and, despite the differences of their people, helps Larry. After seeing the kind act of a supposed enemy, the mayor concludes that everyone should help each other no matter how different they are. The feud ends and the two cities now throw flowers and candy at each other. In the second story, Junior Asparagus tells Dad Asparagus that he is not going to invite a new kid, Fernando, to his birthday party because he thinks that the boy is weird. Bob and Larry arrive in their small spaceship and take Junior to the U.S.S. Applepies, having discovered that the ship is without power and is in the path of a giant meteor. While Scooter, the ship's engineer, frantically works to fix the ship's engines, Junior suggests that two new crew members Jimmy and Jerry Gourd can help save the ship when Scooter tells him that the meteor is made of popcorn. Launched into space, Jimmy and Jerry eat the meteor before it can collide with the ship. Junior celebrates with the crew before being taken home by Bob and Larry, where he tells his dad that he has reconsidered and will invite Fernando to his party despite how different he is. Bob and Larry then come back looking for the freeway, to which Junior gives them directions. Silly Song: "The Hairbrush Song"
4	"Rack, Shack & Benny"	November 28, 1995
This video covers peer pressure and encourages viewers to stand up for their beliefs. This story is an adaptation of the biblical story of Shadrach, Meshach, and Abednego from the Book of Daniel told by George, which takes place at the Nezzer Chocolate Factory where the employees work hard all day making chocolate bunnies on an assembly line. In celebration of the company shipping their two-millionth chocolate bunny, Mr. Nezzer announces that for thirty minutes, all employees may eat all the bunnies they want. While all the other workers ravenously devour the chocolate, Shack (Junior Asparagus) convinces his friends Rack (Bob the Tomato) and Benny (Larry the Cucumber) that they should stop eating them, reminding them that their parents taught them that too much candy is very unhealthy. He emphasizes his stance by singing a lullaby called "Think of Me" that his mother taught him. When thirty minutes have passed, Mr. Nezzer leaves his office to discover that all the workers are sick, with the exception of Rack, Shack, and Benny, who are rewarded and promoted to Junior Executives. The following day, Mr. Nezzer calls the trio into his office, informing them that he has constructed a 90-foot-tall bunny statue and enacted a law that requires all employees to bow down and sing "The Bunny Song." According to the lyrics of the song, nothing in the world (such as God, church, school, healthy food, and family) is more important than the bunny. Those who do not bow down and sing the song will be found guilty of being "bad bunnies," thrown into the factory's furnace, and sentenced to death by incineration. Later, at the statue's dedication ceremony, Mr. Nezzer commands all of his workers to bow and sing "The Bunny Song". However, Mr. Lunt notices that the trio are not bowing nor singing, so Mr. Nezzer confronts the trio. Eventually, the trio respond by instead singing "Think of Me" in protest. Mr. Nezzer is touched by the song, but still orders their death sentence. Meanwhile, Laura Carrot plans their rescue. Mr. Nezzer sentences the trio to death by sending them down the garbage chute to the furnace, but Laura rushes in and catches them in her flying delivery truck. After a failed attempt to flee through the factory's ventilation system, Mr. Lunt operates a pair of mechanical arms which grab the truck and tilt it toward the furnace. Laura stops the arms by pulling the plug, but the truck fails to support the trio's weight and they fall right into the furnace. Mr. Nezzer gloats as the three fall in, but Mr. Lunt sees four people (the trio and a shiny person) inside, none of whom are being incinerated. Shocked, Mr. Nezzer tells the trio to come out. After they emerge from the furnace unscathed, Mr. Nezzer realizes that it was God who saved the trio, and feeling guilty for his actions apologizes to them, and the trio forgive him. They then sing a song about standing up for what they believe in. Silly Song: "Dance of the Cucumber"
5	"Dave and the Giant Pickle"	April 2, 1996
This video's message is that little guys can do big things too. This story is an adaptation of the biblical story of David and Goliath from the First Book of Samuel. In the desert near Jerusalem, Dave (Junior Asparagus) and his three brothers (Jimmy and Jerry Gourd and Tom Grape) are tending a flock of sheep. Jimmy, Jerry, and Tom are constantly picking on Dave and making him do their bidding. Eventually, their father, Jesse (Pa Grape), comes with the news that the Philistines (The French Peas) are attacking and that King Saul (Archibald Asparagus) is gathering an army to face the threat. Jimmy, Jerry, Tom, and Dave run off to volunteer, but Dave is stopped by Jesse who tells him that "big people do big things and little people do little things", forcing him to stay and tend to the sheep alone. At King Saul's camp, the Israelites and the Philistines reach a compromise to end the war quickly: They will have their two greatest fighters face off with the champion determining who shall win the war. Because the Philistines are small, King Saul agrees, but he soon regrets this when the Philistines bring out the 30-foot-tall Goliath. This causes the Israelites to run away and hide. No one is willing to fight Goliath, and the Israelites stall for forty days. One day, Dave is sent to the camp to deliver food to his brothers and is ashamed at the sight of the Israelites hiding from the Philistines. Jimmy and Jerry warn Dave about Goliath, but Dave tells King Saul that he will fight. King Saul is shocked, but Dave says God can help little people make a difference. Dave then goes into battle armed with nothing but stones and a sling, while Goliath dons a pair of boxing gloves. The battle is short as Dave slings one of the stones at Goliath and strikes him between the eyes, knocking him out. The Philistines panic and run away, while Dave celebrates his victory with the Israelites. Silly Song: "I Love My Lips"
6	"The Toy That Saved Christmas"	October 22, 1996
George tells a bedtime story to his granddaughter Annie. In the story, Mr. Nezzer is the owner of a toy company who, via television commercial, is spreading the word of his newest toyline, "Buzz-Saw Louie", with a working buzz saw built into his right arm and a trigger in his nose that makes him tell kids to get more toys (though due to the collapse of a bridge, delivery isn't available in Puggslyville). After seeing the commercial, the kids of Dinkletown begin begging their parents for more toys. As Buzz-Saw Louie dolls roll off the production line, one of them inexplicably comes to life and escapes the factory to search for the true meaning of Christmas. On Christmas Eve, Larry, Bob, and Junior go sledding and crash into a fence. They happen upon the escaped Louie and offer to help him on his quest. They see George, who reads the Nativity of Jesus from Gospel of Luke and explains that the true meaning of Christmas is to give, not get. The Veggies and Louie are heartened by the news and are left wondering how to tell the rest of the people about the true meaning of Christmas before Christmas Day. They sneak into Mr. Nezzer's TV studio in order to broadcast this message live on TV. While they are broadcasting their message, Mr. Nezzer discovers them and they are captured. While threatening to send them away tied up in a sled, Mr. Nezzer is interrupted by the families of Dinkletown, who intervene. Upon receiving a teddy bear as a present, Mr. Nezzer repents. The story concludes with everyone in Dinkletown, including Mr. Nezzer, getting together to celebrate Christmas, while Louie starts a business to make use of his saw. Silly Song: "Oh, Santa!"
7	"A Very Silly Sing-Along!"	February 4, 1997
The episode begins on the countertop as Larry welcomes the viewers to what he thinks is the first "VeggieTales Workout Video". He begins exercising, and then proceeds to the trampoline, gradually jumping higher until he begins hitting the cupboard directly above him. As he begins to yell to Bob for help, Bob comes onscreen and informs the viewers that Larry is confused, and that the video is actually the first "VeggieTales Sing-Along tape". He explains that they will play their favorite VeggieTales songs and place the lyrics on the bottom of the screen. To demonstrate, Bob sings a song while the French Peas type on Qwerty, after which they continue to type even after Bob calls for them to stop and Larry still yells for him to help. Bob immediately asks for the songs to start as chaos ensues in the kitchen. Silly Song: "The Pirates Who Don't Do Anything" Awards: This episode won a Chicago Film Festival Award for Best Animated Home Entertainment and a GMA Dove Award for Best Long Form Music Video of the Year.
8	"Larry-Boy! & the Fib from Outer Space!"	April 22, 1997
This video features a story about honesty and telling the truth. The episode begins with Percy and his brother Li'l Pea leaving a movie theater and seeing what appears to be a comet. Jimmy and Jerry Gourd, who staff an early-warning radar station at the Bumblyburg Science Lab, alert Larry-Boy of the approaching object. Upon landing, the comet turns out to be a small blue alien named Fibrilious Minimus (or Fib, for short). Meanwhile, Junior Asparagus and Laura Carrot are having a tea party at the former's house, where Junior accidentally breaks his father's prized Art Bigotti bowling plate. Soon afterwards, Fib emerges and convinces Junior to lie to his father about the plate claiming, "A little fib couldn't hurt anybody" and Junior tells his father that Laura broke the plate. Junior's dad believes him, but Junior soon discovers that his "little fib" grows larger every time he lies. Larry-Boy begins to search for the alien but to no avail, however he does see Fib with Junior saying "hello boys" to them, unaware that Fib was what he was looking for. Percy later sees Junior and reports how Laura was confronted about the plate and she said it was Junior. When asked which story is true, Junior tells Percy that Laura's brother Lenny fed the plate to a crocodile. As night falls, Laura, Percy, and Lenny confront Junior about his lies. When he tells a lie about aliens coming to Earth and swapping brains with cows and the cows breaking the plate, Percy immediately recognizes this as a lie, having seen a similar event in a movie he had recently seen. Soon enough, Fib grows into a large monster and holds Junior hostage whilst wrecking the town. Larry-Boy is again summoned and is forced to pursue The Fib and Junior in his Larry-Mobile as Fib climbs to the top of the water tower. Larry-Boy transforms the Larry-Mobile into the Larry-Plane and flies into the sky, but ejects after finding out the Larry-Plane is unarmed, which causes him to get caught by The Fib. Larry-Boy is about to be consumed when his butler, Alfred (Archibald Asparagus), tells him that Junior is the only one who can stop The Fib. Junior then confesses the truth about his untruths to his mom and dad who are watching from below and as he tells the truth, The Fib shrinks down to nothing. Junior then apologizes to his father about breaking the plate and promises to start telling the truth right away. Soon after, a red Fib lands in Junior's neighborhood.
9	"Josh and the Big Wall!"	November 18, 1997
This video features a story about listening and obeying God's instructions, even if they don't make sense. This story is an adaptation of the biblical story of Joshua and the Battle of Jericho from the Book of Joshua. The Israelites, having been held as slaves in Egypt, are liberated by Moses (Mr. Nezzer) and led to the Promised Land. However, they flee upon seeing Goliath's family in the land and are banished from the Promised Land for forty years. Upon the completion of their forty-year exile, Moses had died, meaning that Joshua (Larry the Cucumber) has become the leader of the Israelites. Joshua leads them back to the Promised Land, but the city of Jericho prevents them from going further. The Israelites are greeted coldly by the defenders of Jericho (the French Peas), who taunt them from atop the city's great walls. Joshua tries to explain that God has given the land to the Israelites and he gives the defenders the opportunity to leave. The Israelites are instead met by more insults and smug jeering. When Phillipe accidentally drops a slushie off the wall, which hits Jimmy on the head, the Israelites decide to camp out for the night. That night, the Israelites argue about what to do. Pa Grape wants to go back to Egypt, and Jimmy and Jerry are convinced they need firepower to attack the wall, and so begin constructing a giant rocket. Meanwhile, Joshua meets the commander of the Army of the Lord (Archibald Asparagus), who tells him how the Israelites are to take Jericho: they must march around the city once a day for six days and on the seventh day, they are to march around it seven times while the priests blow their horns and the people yell as loud as they can, after which the walls of Jericho will fall. The next morning, Joshua reports the plan to the Israelites, but they are unsure if it will work. Meanwhile, Jimmy and Jerry have finished building their rocket. Eventually, Joshua talks them into trying it God's way and leads them back to Jericho. While marching around the walls, the Israelites' patience is put to the test when they are attacked by the city's defenders with insults and slushies. The end of the day finds the drenched and desperate Israelites on the verge of rebellion, while Joshua refuses to quit. At this point, Junior intervenes and convinces them to continue with the plan, saying that God's way always works out in the end. Inspired by Junior's speech, the Israelites agree to stick with the plan. Despite getting ambushed with more slushies, they remain undeterred and march around Jericho as specified. On the seventh day, they blow their horns and yell, causing the walls to collapse. The Israelites walk into the city, victorious, while the defenders are punished for their defiance by ending up with nothing, and being forced to flee. Silly Song: "The Song of the Cebu"
10	"Madame Blueberry"	July 21, 1998
This video features a story about being thankful with what God gives you. In a takeoff of the story of Madame Bovary, Madame Blueberry is rich and lives in a sparsely-decorated tree house. Though her butlers (Bob the Tomato and Larry the Cucumber) attend to her every whim, they find themselves unable to lift her spirits. The only happiness she seems to have comes from photographs of her neighbor's possessions. One day, a trio of salesmen (The Scallions) arrive at Madame Blueberry's house to promote a new local mega-store, the Stuff-Mart, saying the store has everything she needs to be happy. Though Bob has his doubts, Madame Blueberry eagerly follows the three salesmen to the store. Along the way, she sees Annie happily celebrating her birthday with her parents, though all she has to celebrate with is a piece of apple pie. She wonders why Annie is so happy with so little, but forgets about it upon entering the store. Madame Blueberry goes on a shopping spree and has all of her new possessions delivered to her tree house. During a lunch break, Madame Blueberry sees Junior Asparagus's excitement over a ball his dad bought for him in spite of his disappointment that his dad could not afford the train set he really wanted. Madame Blueberry again wonders how someone can be happy with so little while she is not happy despite having everything she wants. Madame Blueberry realizes that she wants a happy heart, and finally feels thankful for what she has. The weight of the ongoing deliveries render the tree house unstable, which startles Madame Blueberry and her butlers. They take carts (with the exception of Larry, who is in a carrying basket) and attempt to race to the house and stop the deliveries in time. They manage to make it in time to see the tree house still tilted from the weight of the deliveries until it becomes stable. Just then, a butterfly lands on the weather vane of the tree house, which causes the back door to open and dump Madame Blueberry's possessions into the lake below. The house, having lost all of its weight, is flung into the air by the tree, after which it collapses in the parking lot of the Stuff-Mart. Madame Blueberry is comforted by the presence of her butlers, Annie, Junior, and their parents, and trusts that everything will turn out right in the end. Silly Song: Replaced with "Love Songs with Mr. Lunt" ("His Cheeseburger")
11	"Silly Sing-Along 2: The End of Silliness?"	November 24, 1998
In a fit of indignation, Archibald Asparagus has cancelled "Silly Songs with Larry", the part of the show where Larry comes out and sings a silly song. Will Archibald ever forgive Larry? Includes "His Cheeseburger", "The Song of the Cebu" and "Stuff Mart Rap". Silly Song: "The Yodeling Veterinarian of the Alps" Award: This episode was nominated for a GMA Dove Award for Best Long Form Music Video of the Year.
12	"Larry-Boy and the Rumor Weed"	July 27, 1999
The second Larry-Boy tale in the Veggietales series, this video features a story about the consequences of gossip and rumours. Percy Pea and Li'l Pea are leaving a movie theater and are cornered by a shady Scallion, known as the Milk Money Bandit (Scallion #3), who asks them for a nickel. Percy refuses, but the Scallion then demands the money he is carrying as milk money. After stealing the money and escaping to the rooftops with his loot, Larry-Boy confronts him and shakes the stolen money off of him before throwing him into Scooter's police car. Soon after, he begins reviewing his capture technique with his butler, Alfred (Archibald Asparagus), but in the process accidentally knocks a potted plant off the ledge. The plant gets caught on some telephone lines on the way down, where a woman is gossiping on the phone, then falls into a sewer drain where the gossip brings the plant to life. The next morning, Alfred is telling stories at a school and tells the teacher (Dad Asparagus) that he needs to go home and recharge his batteries. Junior Asparagus and Laura Carrot take what he said literally and jump to the false conclusion that Alfred is a robot. As they walk home, discussing what they heard Alfred say, a small talking weed pipes up wanting to hear more, and they talk to it under the impression the information will be kept secret. Soon, similar weeds begin to appear throughout town, spreading the rumor. Larry and Alfred are tending to a garden when Alfred heads inside to answer the phone. Another weed appears and tries to spread the rumor, but Larry does not listen. Alfred then calls Larry in, and Mayor Blueberry (Madame Blueberry) informs him that strange weeds are growing all over Bumblyburg, spreading the rumor about Alfred. She also warns that if they are not eradicated, property values will sink. Suiting up as Larry-Boy, he dives into action. Larry-Boy manages to find a weed and attempts to shred it with a weed whacker, which malfunctions. He then tries to cut it with shears, but that also proves to be in vain. Alfred then has Larry-Boy scan the weed with his plunger ear. Back at the Larry-Cave, Alfred discovers that all the weeds are connected to a mother weed underground. Upon arriving in the sewer, Larry-Boy meets the mother weed and is quickly overpowered. Alfred learns the citizens are afraid of him, saying that he is a robot with laser eyes. Suddenly, the mother weed breaks out of the ground and snatches Alfred, but the citizens refuse to help. When Dad Asparagus arrives and asks what is going on, the mother weed says that she heard the story from very reliable sources. Junior and Laura confess they took what Alfred had said literally and started the rumor. Dad explains to them that it was a figure of speech and when Alfred said he had recharge his batteries, he meant that he was tired and needed to go home and rest. He also explains to them even if it's true, God doesn't want them to tell stories that can hurt; He want them to spread nice words. Dad's words cause flowers to bloom on the mother weed. Junior and Laura decide that the way to save Alfred is to spread nice words about him, and they convince the citizens that Alfred is not a robot. The mother weed continues sprouting flowers until she herself transforms into a flower. Alfred forgives them for the misunderstanding just as a battered Larry-Boy drags himself out of the sewer.
The 2000s
13	"King George and the Ducky"	April 1, 2000
This video features a story about being selfless instead of selfish. In a mini-segment in the style of a play, an Englishman (Scallion #1) traverses a hill and steals all the bananas. Then a Swede (Jerry Gourd) traverses another hill and steals all the strawberries. Both men refuse to eat their own fruit without the other fruit (stating that bananas cannot be eaten without strawberries and vice versa), but are unwilling to share with each other, and as a result, they are stuck. The main story is an adaptation of the biblical story of David and Bathsheba from the Second Book of Samuel. King George (Larry the Cucumber) only cares about bathing and rubber duckies. His servant Louis (Bob the Tomato) tries to tell him that the kingdom is in the middle of the great pie war, but King George does not care. To him, the most important person in the world is himself. As King George proclaims his love for himself and his rubber ducky, he notices one which belongs to Thomas (Junior Asparagus). Jealous, King George tells Louis to get him the duck, but Louis refuses. Cedric (Scallion #1) says that they need more men on the battlefield. Seeing his opportunity, King George announces that Thomas wants to help and tells Cedric to put Thomas on the front line of the battle by his lonesome. With Thomas out of the way, King George tells Louis to meet him at Thomas's house so they can take the duck. King George and Louis manage to steal the duck and the king is happy. Before King George can take a bath with his duck, Cedric and Thomas come. According to Cedric, Thomas ended the war all on his own, but has suffered the trauma of war in the process. King George quickly shoos them away and again tries to get in the bath, but is interrupted by Melvin (Pa Grape). Melvin tells a story of two men, one with many sheep and one with a single sheep. Visited by a guest, the rich man steals the sheep from the poor man to serve for dinner. Furious, King George asks who this rich man is, and Melvin points out that it is King George himself. Melvin tells King George that whether he is a king or just a kid, God wants them all to put others first. Looking to make up for his sins, King George lets Thomas take a bath in his bathtub, which cures his trauma, and then returns his duck as a souvenir. Silly Song: "Endangered Love ('Barbara Manatee')" Note: This is the first episode animated in Maya. Note 2: This is also the first episode of the 2000s.
14	"Esther... The Girl Who Became Queen"	September 30, 2000
This video features a story about courage. The story is an adaptation of the biblical story of Esther from the Book of Esther with settings and undertones inspired by Casablanca and The Godfather franchise. The story opens at the royal palace of Persia where Haman (Mr. Lunt), King Xerxes's (Mr. Nezzer) right-hand-man, is throwing Queen Vashti out for insubordination (when she refused to make King Xerxes a sandwich at 3:00 AM). A search is then initiated to find a new queen. The next morning, Esther and her cousin Mordecai (Pa Grape) are discussing her friend who stole an apple. Esther lacks the courage to confront her, but Mordecai believes she shouldn't be afraid to do what is right. When Haman drives up in a faux-car to collect the eligible maidens, he spots Mordecai and orders him to bow in his presence, but Mordecai refuses as he bows down to no one except his God and his king. Haman then spots Esther and has her taken to the palace with the other maidens (though the relationship between Mordecai and Esther is kept secret). At the palace, King Xerxes and Haman audition the maidens to be the new queen. When Esther takes the stage and sings, King Xerxes is left in awe and the decision is made. However, Esther does not wish to be the queen, but regardless she is crowned and ensconced in her new life against her will. One day in the throne room of the palace, King Xerxes is visited by the Peaoni brothers (The French Peas), who plan to crush him with a grand piano while distracting him with a cake. Mordecai, who is hiding in a corner (presumably to avoid Haman), observes the plot and informs Esther. Esther warns King Xerxes in time and the piano crashes harmlessly onto the cake. King Xerxes thanks her for saving his life, but she indicates Mordecai alerted her, saying that the credit should be his. Haman banishes the Peaoni Brothers to the Island of Perpetual Tickling for their crimes of attempting to crush King Xerxes and for entering the throne room uninvited. Though King Xerxes believes he is safe, Haman convinces him that a greater threat awaits, which is a family that cannot be trusted. Unaware that Haman is talking about Mordecai, King Xerxes unwittingly authorizes an edict to have him and his family banished to the Island of Perpetual Tickling. Mordecai finds the edict posted in the town and visits Esther on her balcony at the palace. He appeals to her to reveal Haman's evil plans to King Xerxes, but she is afraid as she lacks the courage to confront King Xerxes and struggles with what to do. While Mordecai reminds her that she need not fear to do what's right, action does not come easy for Esther. Twice, she attempts to inform King Xerxes, and both times she fails, lamely inviting King Xerxes and Haman to dinner instead. Meanwhile, Haman attempts to get Mordecai to bow to him again and threatens to have his banishment carried out immediately when he refuses. His attempt is foiled when King Xerxes utterly humiliates him by declaring his plan to throw a parade in Mordecai's honor for saving his life. On her third attempt, Esther is finally able to muster up the courage to face King Xerxes, and in the process unveils Haman's scheme, forcing King Xerxes to banish him to the Island of Perpetual Tickling. Mordecai ends up filling Haman's former position as King Xerxes's right-hand-man as Esther, having saved her people, gazes out the side of the palace with a smile.
15	"Lyle the Kindly Viking"	March 24, 2001
This video is a takeover by Archibald Asparagus with a message about sharing. Omelet (Jimmy Gourd) is a prince of a kingdom in Denmark who desires some eggs cooked light and fluffy to eat. A baker named Horatio (Scooter) brings them to him and informs him that they are the last eggs in the kingdom. Regardless, Omelet feels happy about eating the eggs until Ophelia (Mr. Lunt, remarks "I think we're gonna get letters about this") asks him to instead of share the eggs with the kingdom. However, Omelet selfishly refuses. Later, Omelet joins a game of Battleship with Percy Pea and is encouraged by him to share the eggs. As Omelet announces his plan to share, he learns that the town has plenty of eggs (they were being used for ping-pong balls) and has light-and-fluffy eggs, or "omelettes", cooked for everybody. Larry and Junior in the audience are bewildered by the antiquated English. The main story, presented allegedly as a "long lost musical of Gilbert and Sullivan", focuses on Lyle (Junior Asparagus) who quietly lives on an island with his fellow vikings. As the vikings return to the island with loot pillaged from a nearby monastery, Lyle slips out on his own ship and gives the monks (Pa Grape and the Peas) his small share of loot and homemade potholders as a small act of compensation. One day, Lyle's trips are discovered by fellow vikings Otar and Sven (Bob the Tomato and Larry the Cucumber), who confront him, but they promise to keep it secret after Lyle convinces them that sharing is a much nicer alternative to pillaging and plundering. A few days later, Lyle is discovered by the viking leader Olaf (Mr. Nezzer), who does not approve and wants to make an example of him. When a storm capsizes the viking ships, the monks rescue Lyle, who convinces the monks to save the rest of the doomed vikings. This show of kindness convinces the vikings to share what they have. The authors of Lyle turn out to be Gilbert Jones and Sullivan O'Kelly. Silly Song: Replaced with "Classy Songs with Larry" ("Larry's High Silk Hat") Note: This is the first episode released on DVD. Awards: Lyle the Kindly Viking won the best direct-to-home video production award at the 2001 World Animation Celebration Festival. Lyle the Kindly Viking was nominated for an Annie Award for Best Home Entertainment in 2002. This episode also won a Parents' Choice Award.
16	"The Ultimate Silly Song Countdown"	September 15, 2001
On the countertop, the Pirates Who Don't Do Anything, consisting of Larry the Cucumber, Pa Grape, and Mr. Lunt, host a countdown of the top ten silly songs as voted on by the viewers. The list includes: 10: Endangered Love (from "King George and the Ducky"); 9: The Dance of the Cucumber (from "Rack, Shack and Benny"); 8: Larry's High Silk Hat (from "Lyle the Kindly Viking"); 7: The Water Buffalo Song (from "Where's God When I'm S-Scared?"); 6: The Yodeling Veterinarian of the Alps (from "Silly Sing-Along 2: The End of Silliness?"); 5: The Song of the Cebu (from "Josh and the Big Wall!"); 4: His Cheeseburger (from "Madame Blueberry"); 3: Love My Lips (from "Dave and the Giant Pickle"); 2: The Pirates Who Don't Do Anything (from "Very Silly Songs!"); 1: The Hairbrush Song (from "Are You My Neighbor?")
17	"The Star of Christmas"	October 29, 2002
The episode is set in Victorian London. Cavis Appythart (Bob the Tomato) and Millward Phelps (Larry the Cucumber) are jingle writers who decide to make their big break into the musical theatre. While Millward is content to see their work featured on billboards and in newspapers, Cavis believes they can make a difference in crime-ridden London by staging a grand musical that will move the citizens to greater expressions of love. Their opportunity arises when Millward's Uncle Ebenezer Nezzer grants them the use of his theater on Christmas Eve. They plan the huge production of a new musical called "The Princess and the Plumber". However, with only three days left until Christmas Eve, they still need a script. Seymour Schwenk (Pa Grape), their friend and an inventor, shows up in an experimental rocket car and delivers a box of light bulbs to them. Cavis maintains that if their production is glitzy and bright (electric lights are still a novelty at this time and were first introduced at the Savoy Theatre for Gilbert and Sullivan's Patience) then their show will be a bigger hit and reach more people. He plans to integrate the lights directly into the scenery itself. Cavis and Millward also need to convince the city's premiere talent, Constance Effie Pickering (Madame Blueberry), to star in the lead role, and they need to get a commitment from Prince Calvin Fredrick (Mr. Lunt) to attend the premiere. While Cavis and his assistant Bob Winston (Jean-Claude Pea) work on Pickering and the Prince, Millward works to complete the script. Everything eventually starts coming together, and Cavis starts feeling confident that their production will be a huge success. After noticing a flyer for a Christmas pageant planned to occur on the same night at a local church, Cavis goes to investigate. He observes Edmund Gilbert (Junior Asparagus) preparing a low-budget children's play, and concludes that it poses no threat to their production. However, the pageant intends to feature an object called the Star of Christmas. Wondering aloud about this as he leaves the church, Cavis is overheard by Arthur McHollingshead (Archibald Asparagus), a historian who reveals that the Star of Christmas is an ancient relic that has not been publicly displayed for 79 years. He rushes off with great excitement to report the news, which promptly makes the front-page headlines the next morning. Faced with the prospect of losing their audience, and in particular the Prince, to the church pageant, Cavis and Millward wish to make their own production greater and flashier, and in desperation sneak into the church to steal the star. They are caught, however, and narrowly escape from the aged Moyer the Destroyer (Scooter) who was left to guard the relic. With the star and the flashy lights, Cavis is certain that "The Princess and the Plumber" is now a guaranteed success. But during dress rehearsal, the excessive number of lights, which Seymour had warned were a fire hazard, ignite the curtains. The theater goes up in flames, taking with it the Star of Christmas. As Cavis and Millward mope over this terrible turn of events, Dwiglight Howarde (Jerry Gourd) arrives with Moyer to arrest them for stealing the star. In the jail, they meet a prisoner, Charles Pincher, who laughs at their efforts to spread love by means of an elaborate stage production. He claims that real love makes sacrifices to help others without expecting anything in return and is extremely rare. As if on cue, Edmund and his father, Reverend Gilbert (Dad Asparagus), arrive at the jail to release Cavis and Millward, having chosen out of love not to press charges for the theft of the star. Cavis is moved, and he expresses his desire to attend the pageant. However, the pageant is scheduled to start in ten minutes and there is not enough time to walk there. Just then, Seymour arrives in his rocket car. He entrusts Millward to drive the vehicle and try to get them all to the church on time. After a harrowing ride fraught with collisions and near-misses, Cavis, Millward, Edmund, and Reverend Gilbert arrive at the church just as the pageant is about to start. The pageant is a success, with Prince Calvin and Miss Pickering in attendance. Cavis finally learns that Christmas is not about glitz and grand productions, but about a baby in a manger, Jesus, who is the Star of Christmas. After the pageant, Ebenezer chews out Cavis and Millward in regards to the theater and suggests they work in his factory to pay it off (setting the stage for the events of An Easter Carol), after which Moyer shows them that the Star of Christmas is safe and that the duo stole the Turtle of Damascus, which he claims most experts consider to be a hoax. The episode ends with Cavis and Millward performing a selfless act at last: they bring cookies and a gift to Charles Pincher in his jail cell, and Cavis says, smiling warmly, "Merry Christmas, Mr. Pincher." Awards: The episode was nominated for Best Animated Home Entertainment Production in the 30th Annie Awards, but lost to Rolie Polie Olie: The Great Defender of Fun.
18	"The Wonderful World of Auto-Tainment!"	May 20, 2003
After Bob and Larry briefly argue over the theme song, a door opens up and they come out of it. Throughout the beginning, Larry slowly reveals the "Wonderful World of Auto-Tainment" to Bob. Ventril-o-Matic and Rusty play a role in this episode as the adjudicators, as does Mr. Lunt (as the "Techno-Gourd of the future"), who runs the machine, which consists of the Wheel of Veggies, which spins most of the VeggieTales cast as if on a roulette, and the Swarming Balls of Disorder, which determine both the topic and genre of the song. Whoever is randomly selected by the wheel will be kicked off the machine and into a performance room, being forced to sing a song in the process. Jean-Claude and Phillipe, Pa Grape, Archibald Asparagus, and Junior Asparagus are forced to sing songs. The French Pea duo starts off the show by singing the cumulative song "There's a Hole in Bottom of the Sea" with a slide show. Pa Grape is second, singing "Zacchaeus". The show takes a break as animated parable "Lunch" is shown. A blue man named Ed (accompanied by his green dog, Mozart) tries to buy a treat from a vending machine, but the serve button does not work. Frustrated, he tries to smack the button enough so it will work, but the machine falls on him. With barely enough strength, he lifts the machine, trying to get it back in its former position, when his treat slips out of the deposit area. He tries to get it, but is crushed again by the machine. He manages to lift it until it is on its other side. He gets the treat and is just about to eat it when a bird poops on it. Ed mopes over the loss of his treat as the parable cuts off with a text screen "The End". The show resumes with Archibald Asparagus singing Gilbert and Sullivan's "I Am the Very Model of a Modern Major-General". Rusty begins to lash out at Ventril-o-Matic. At the last second, Larry steps into the performance room, and sings "You Are My Sunshine", with Junior Asparagus and a flower chorus. Rusty is in bliss and requests to watch an aardvark sing. After Binky the Opera Singer walks off the stage frustrated no one has clapped for him, Pa Grape is once again selected on the wheel and sings the folk song "Low Bridge". Bob expresses his hatred of the future as Rusty begins experiencing mood swings. Junior closes the show by singing a song about going to bed, praying and telling God about his day, and talking to God about how, according to the Bible, he loves him. He also tells God about making mistakes (not sharing toys, coloring on the wall, making noise). After the song, Bob and Larry announce their departure from the future by saying that they are ready to go home, so they say goodbye and travel back to the present time, with Mr. Lunt catching up to them at the last second claiming to be disturbed by Rusty and Ventril-o-Matic and wanting to go back to the present.
19	"The Ballad of Little Joe"	August 5, 2003
This video's theme is all about facing hardship. The story is a western adaptation of the biblical story of Joseph from the Book of Genesis. As the story begins, we are introduced to the brothers (The French Peas) and Little Joe (Larry the Cucumber) who all live at the Okie-Dokie Corral. Among Joe's unique skills are the abilities to solve problems, organize resources, and interpret dreams. We soon learn that it is Little Joe's birthday, and the brothers' father (Pa Grape) lavishes attention and gifts upon him. When Joe foretells a time when his brothers will bow down before him, their jealousy turns to spite, and they decide to sell him into slavery to the Scallions. He travels on a zig-zag path and ends up in Dodgeball City in the year 1890, where he starts working at a saloon for Mr. McPotipher (Scooter), and his unique skills quickly make him an invaluable employee. Also working at the saloon is Miss Kitty (Madame Blueberry), who entertains the patrons from the stage. She also becomes jealous of Joe when he is named Employee of the Month in her place. She frames him and he is arrested by the town's sheriff (Bob the Tomato) for the theft of gold, a crime he did not commit. Joe keeps a positive attitude in jail and is able to help the Baker (Jimmy Gourd) and the Blacksmith (Jerry Gourd), who have been haunted by dreams. The interpretations come true: the Baker returns to work and the Blacksmith is enslaved. When his reputation comes to the attention of the Mayor (Mr. Nezzer), Joe is summoned to interpret a particularly disturbing dream of the latter, in which seven fat cows are devoured by seven scrawny cows. Joe understands immediately and warns the Mayor: there will be seven years of plenty followed by seven years of famine from 1890 to 1897. He suggests that the mayor fill the storehouses now so they will be prepared. Joe is put in charge of distributing the grain during the years of famine. When he recognizes his own family has come to procure food, he is overcome with emotion. He wants to reveal himself to them, but first needs to know if they have changed. He devises a plan where he frames the youngest brother, Benjamin (Junior Asparagus), for theft to see how they respond. When all the brothers insist on taking the fall in his place and rue the previous loss of another brother, Joe reveals his identity. Jude (Jean-Claude Pea) apologizes to Joe for what he has done to him, who explains that God used the wrong he did to turn it into good, and forgives his brothers. The story concludes with the happy reunion. Silly Song: "Belly Button" with Boyz in the Sink Awards: "Belly Button" won a Chicago Film Festival Award for Best Animated Short and was nominated for an Annie Award for Best Animated Short. "Belly Button" was also nominated for a GMA Dove Award for Best Music Video of the year in 2004.
20	"An Easter Carol"	February 10, 2004
A sequel to The Star of Christmas, as well as an Easter version adaptation of A Christmas Carol. It is the day before Easter and the local church is scheduled to have a new window unveiling service at the next day's morning service. Ebenezer Nezzer, who owns a local factory, used to attend church with his grandma when he was little, but no longer goes. Reverend Gilbert (Dad Asparagus) and his son Edmund (Junior Asparagus) agree to pay Ebenezer a visit and invite him to the Easter service. Cavis Appythart (Bob the Tomato) and Ebenezer's nephew, Millward Phelps (Larry the Cucumber), are working in Ebenezer's factory to repay him after burning down his theater more than a year prior. Cavis and Millward disagree over who should approach Ebenezer and ask for a day off for Easter. When the duo ask, Ebenezer lectures them about the history of how his grandmother started making Easter eggs. Ebenezer recalls that before his grandma died, she told him to tell everyone "Easter means no death." He misunderstands this, thinking that as long as he makes Easter eggs he will keep his grandma alive forever. When Reverend Gilbert and Edmund arrive, Ebenezer explains that he plans to tear down the church on Easter morning and build an Easterland theme park in its place. When the four protest, Ebenezer becomes furious and kicks them out of the factory, firing Cavis and Millward in the process. The townsfolk soon learn about the news and are worried about the demolition of the church, but cannot stop Ebenezer since he owns the property on which the church is located. That night, while Ebenezer is asleep, he sees a vision of his grandma telling him he has missed the point of Easter, and at the stroke of midnight, he will receive a second visitor to help him understand. Meanwhile, Cavis and Millward attempt, but fail, to break into the factory to steal the Easterland plans. Mr. Nezzer then wakes up from his vision and intends to stay awake for the visitor. He falls asleep waiting for the visitor, and at the stroke of midnight, a clockwork egg suddenly opens and an angel named Hope emerges. She wakes Ebenezer and starts showing him Easter Past, beginning with a church service. A young Ebenezer and his grandma are in attendance, and Grandma Nezzer is trying to get Ebenezer to understand the story of Easter, but the young Ebenezer is mainly focused on his basket of eggs and wondering why one egg he received is empty. Next, Hope shows Ebenezer Easter from a year ago, when Ebenezer first started making plastic Easter eggs. He talks to an inventor named Seymour (Pa Grape) and gets Seymour to agree to invent plastic chickens that can make plastic eggs. Seymour is not paid, but Ebenezer does give him an early free pass to Easterland much to Hope's dismay. Hope and Ebenezer return to Easter Present and visit the Reverend's house, where he and Moyer (Scooter) are discussing about the church. It is revealed that Grandma Nezzer paid for all of the church windows herself, and that just before she died she commissioned the new window that they were going to unveil on Easter morning. Ebenezer remains adamant that remaining loyal to his grandma's business and Easterland is the only way to maintain her memory. Hope and Ebenezer then learn that Edmund is sick and will die within a year if nothing changes. Ebenezer is shocked and does not understand why Edmund's parents are so calm with such news. Hope then takes Ebenezer back into the church and teaches him the story of Jesus's life, his Crucifixion, and eventually his Resurrection. With a deeper understanding of Easter's eternal significance, Ebenezer finally accepts his grandmother's passing. Hope then welcomes Ebenezer to Easter Future. The church is being demolished, the orphanage is gone, Edmund has died, and the town's once-brave policeman (Jerry Gourd) has lost the courage to stop criminals. Hope disappears back into the egg and Ebenezer pleads for her to come back because they need her. He rushes back to the church to try to stop the demolition and wakes up. He finds out it is still Easter Present and that he has another chance. Ebenezer arrives at the church and stops the crew (The French Peas) just as demolition is about to start. Millward suddenly rushes in and shouts that the factory is about to explode and that Cavis is trapped inside. Ebenezer rushes back into the factory to save Cavis, and they escape by flinging themselves through one of the factory's windows by use of a machine just as the factory explodes. It starts raining Easter eggs across the town and Ebenezer promises to help fix up the orphanage and help Edmund get the medicine he needs with the money he has left. Guest Star: Rebecca St. James as Hope Featured Song: Hope's Song
21	"A Snoodle's Tale"	May 18, 2004
The video features two short stories about self-worth and embracing who you are. The first story is a loose parody of the Strange Case of Dr Jekyll and Mr Hyde. In the story, an English gentleman named Mr. Butterbun (Scooter) and his butler Poole (Larry the Cucumber) are obsessing about Mr. Sly, a flashy disco dancer who performs on the street at night. The neighbors, including Poole, seem to enjoy his performances, but Butterbun is deeply suspicious. When the dancer disappears into the home of Dr. Jiggle (Jimmy Gourd), he insists that they warn the doctor. Dr. Jiggle also admits to being impressed by the Mr. Sly's fantastic moves, and confesses a desire to be a dancer himself. Unfortunately for him, his portly stature makes this impossible with his jiggly belly being a target for ridicule. When Butterbun requests an audience with Mr. Sly, Dr. Jiggle becomes frantic and quickly shows his guests the doorstep. Butterbun is determined to find out who Mr. Sly really is and why he keeps disappearing into Dr. Jiggle's house. He enlists Poole to set a trap for him, to detain him while he dances and remove his disguise, but this plan fails when Poole instead gets caught up in the dance. The following night, Jiggle faints, and Sly appears again. Butterbun discovers that Jiggle and Sly are the same gourd, and Jiggle confesses to take dance class. Butterbun tells Jiggle that's great and he did not need to hide in a disguise because he's special just the way God made him. Dr. Jiggle finds out that he can dance in his own way. In "A Snoodle's Tale" (the second story that serves as a Dr. Seuss homage), Bob narrates the story of a whimsical little creature known as a Snoodle. The Snoodles live in Snoodleburg, a town which features prominently a large clock tower in the center. Every fourth Tuesday, it spits out a new Snoodle which slides down a chute to join the Snoodle society. The viewers then witness the birth of one such creature named Snoodle Doo. He is born without any knowledge of his talents or abilities, but has on his back a backpack which contains paints, a paintbrush, and a kazoo. He also discovers he has wings. Attempting to figure out his purpose in life, he tries to utilize these gifts: first flying and then painting. However, his attempts are met with ridicule by the older more experienced Snoodles. Making matters worse, they paint him pictures of his failures and stuff them into his backpack. The weight of these pictures (and figuratively their ridicule) drag him down, making him feel worthless. He decides to leave Snoodleburg and, observing the finches flying freely over Mt. Ginches, decides that he too will go there. After an arduous climb he eventually reaches the peak. There he meets a stranger, the creator of the Snoodles (which is a representation of God himself), who lives in a cave high above the clouds. The stranger asks the Snoodle why he is so dejected, and the Snoodle explains that it is because he is no good at anything. The stranger invites him in for tea and throws the hurtful pictures into the fire, assuring him that they look nothing like him. The creator then draws him a new picture, one that shows him confident and proud, which encourages Snoodle Doo to not just fly, but to soar. Snoodle Doo's own picture, the one ridiculed by his elders, is then hung by the stranger on his fridge. The story ends as the young Snoodle flies back to Snoodleburg and tells of his journey to the others. Silly Song: "Sport Utility Vehicle"
22	"Sumo of the Opera"	August 28, 2004
The video features three segments all about perseverance. The first segment is a silent short film. The three veggie stooges (Larry the Cucumber, Mr. Lunt, and Jerry Gourd) are assigned by Mr. Nezzer to deliver a piano to Madame Blueberry, who lives in a mansion at the top of a very high hill. While Mr. Lunt and Jerry give up on the seemingly impossible task, Larry perseveres and is rewarded for his eventual success. In the second segment, Lutfi presents a story about the origin of St. Patrick's Day. The story tells about Maewyn Succat, a young English boy who is kidnapped by the pirates and sold as a slave in Ireland. His new life is miserable and he spends his days in constant prayer, even as those around him celebrate paganism. When God tells him that it is time to leave, Succat runs away and returns to England by way of France. Back at home, Maewyn continues his scholarship and dreams that the people of Ireland are begging him to come back and teach them about Christianity. Succat grows up to become a bishop, is rechristened Saint Patrick, and fulfills his destiny to return to Ireland. In the third segment, the titular story parodies the Karate Kid and Rocky film series, mainly the third Rocky film, as well as Gilbert and Sullivan's comic opera The Mikado. Scallion (Larry the Cucumber) is a sumo wrestler who has difficulty taking anything seriously. He succeeds in injuring his sparring partner Po-Ta-To as a result of his clowning around when Po-Ta-To slips on a banana peel and falls from the ring, injuring his back. He is admonished for his joking by Mikey (Pa Grape), who accuses him of being weak, lacking ambition, and never completing what he starts when Hadrian (Junior Asparagus) reminds him that he has not yet fixed his bike. Meanwhile, the Champion, Apollo Gourd, is looking for an opponent now that Po has been injured. The prize is a tiger bike. Wanting the bike for Hadrian, Scallion accepts the challenge. Mikey agrees to become his trainer on the condition that Scallion does everything he says. Scallion starts out well and trains hard, but when things get difficult, he quits. However, when Scallion sees Hadrian emulating him he realizes that he must set a good example and persevere. He returns to his training with relish and eventually is ready for his match with Apollo Gourd, though naturally no one gives him a chance. However, Scallion does surprisingly well in the match. He lasts longer in the ring than anyone ever has against Apollo. When they both tumble out of the ring at the same moment, the match is called a tie. Unfortunately, this means that Apollo remains the champion. In spite of this, Scallion is victorious for having persevered and even completes the repairs to Hadrian's bike. Silly Song: Replaced with "Schoolhouse Polka with Larry"
23	"Duke and the Great Pie War"	March 5, 2005
The video features two stories all about loving your family. The first story is an adaptation of the biblical story of Miriam and Moses from the Book of Exodus. It takes place in Egypt. Miriam (Laura Carrot) wonders why people in the village refuse to acknowledge that her new baby brother Moses is a boy. She is forced to look after the baby because her parents and elder brother Aaron are working in the brickyards. She finds babysitting tougher than she thought and complains about her plight. But when Aaron is almost run down by a chariot, she learns the value of family. Once she learns that the Egyptians (The French Peas) are taking away all the Hebrew baby boys, Miriam decides to hide Moses in the Nile River. After he is plucked out of the river by Pharaoh's daughter (Miss Achmetha), Miriam offers to have her family care for the new prince. The main story is an adaptation of the biblical story of Ruth and Naomi from the Book of Ruth, set in the Middle ages. Duke (Larry the Cucumber) is a knight from the kingdom of Scone. However, he is terrible at jousting and enrolls in "Ye Old Knight School" for training. When he fails a jousting test, he receives a disapproving look from the arrogant Otis the Elevated (Mr. Lunt). While walking with his friend Lucas (Bob the Tomato) one day, he comes across the sweet Princess Petunia (Petunia Rhubarb). Petunia is a rhubarbarian who has been exiled from her own land and has taken refuge with her poor mother-in-law, Nona (Madame Blueberry) who is Duke's cousin. Duke is smitten with the exiled princess, despite her being a foreigner who is hated by the people of Scone, due to her relatives fighting against them in the great pie war. Nona reveals the history of the family to Duke, how Petunia was the wife of the prince of Scone, how Duke is related to both Petunia and Otis, and how Otis caused the great pie war after refusing to take care of his family. Nona then gives Duke half of a key to the vault of the family castle and says that Otis was given the other half of it. In order to have the key made whole and Petunia restored, Duke must challenge Otis to a joust. The next day, the joust is set up and the audience arrives to watch. The contest involves multiple challenges, among them an obstacle course and a riddle from the Abbott of Costello (Scallion #1). The obstacle course is won by Otis and Duke solves the riddle. With the contest tied, Duke and Otis are required to joust each other using pies to determine the winner. Otis has superior skill, but when the crowd hears Otis's boasting of his selfishness and ruthlessness, the audience starts cheering for Duke which helps him find the motivation he needs to succeed. In the end, Duke marries Petunia and they live happily ever after. This sets up the events as the great pie war is still ongoing when the story happens. Silly Song: Replaced with "The Blues with Larry" Awards: This episode won a Parents' Choice Award.
24	"Minnesota Cuke and the Search for Samson's Hairbrush"	June 25, 2005
The video features two stories about handling bullying. In the first story, Junior Asparagus is discouraged when a big bully named Gourdon claims the playground as his own and threatens to pound anyone who trespasses. Back in his tree house, Junior starts daydreaming about being very heroic with Gourdon always being the antagonist of his dreams. When he declares that he is not afraid, his dad comes and gives him advice on how to overcome his fears. Later, the kids return to the playground. Gourdon appears and threatens to pound Junior every day, but the other kids soon gain courage to stand up to Gourdon as well, Gourdon leaves and everyone cheers. The main story begins with Minnesota (Larry the Cucumber) searching for the Golden Carrot Nose of the Indomitable Snowman in the Himalayas. However, after a chain of events, his archenemy, Professor Rattan (Mr. Lunt), ends up swiping the Golden Carrot Nose and saying, "Finders keepers!". At the children's museum, Minnesota complains about Rattan to his assistant, Martin (Bob the Tomato). Then, a Parkman from New York City (Scallion #1) arrives to inform Minnesota about a plot to steal the biblical Samson's (The Peach) hairbrush, which is believed to possess the great powers of Samson. Apparently, Canadians want to use the power of the hairbrush to take over both halves of Niagara Falls. Assuming that Samson's strength came from his long hair, Minnesota decides he wants to use the power of the hairbrush to get revenge on Rattan. Martin tries to tell him that the trip won't be about getting even with Rattan, but Cuke rejects Martin's idea in favor of his own. The first stop in his search, is an ice cream shop in Malta. He seeks advice from an old friend, a former archaeologist named Julia (Petunia Rhubarb). She gives him an address where he can find out more. Shortly after he leaves, Rattan arrives seeking the same information. When Julia refuses, Rattan sets the freezer to melt causing strawberry ice cream to flood the entire shop. Minnesota returns to save Julia, and she informs Minnesota they need to go to Seville. In the Barbershop of Seville, they are welcomed by the barbers Figaro and Leo, who tell Minnesota of the Catacombs where the hairbrush is secluded. They offer him a map, which Rattan immediately steals. However, they also inform Minnesota of a shortcut to the Catacombs. Minnesota finds the hairbrush, but is confronted by Rattan (who thinks that the reason the hairbrush doesn't work for Cuke is because he has no hair), and the Parkman (who was working for Rattan the entire time) who has captured Julia. Minnesota offers him the hairbrush for Julia's freedom. Martin calls and claims that the hairbrush has no power, and that Samson's power came from God rather than the artifact. Minnesota and Julia escape the Catacombs, but again run into Rattan and the Parkman. Figaro and Leo arrive with two Canadian Mounties (Jimmy and Jerry Gourd) who attempt to arrest Rattan, but Minnesota shows compassion by convincing them to let him go. This redeems Rattan, who offers the hairbrush in return for friendship and Minnesota keeps it in the children's museum. Silly Song: "Pizza Angel" Featured Music Video: "Minnesota Cuke Theme Song" performed by Charlie Daniels
25	"Lord of the Beans"	October 29, 2005
The video is a tale all about using your gifts for good. In a comical parody of The Lord of the Rings trilogy, Randalf (Mr. Nezzer) arrives in the Shire for Billboy Baggypants' (Archibald Asparagus) 122nd birthday party. Billboy talks about retiring and leaving the shire and uses a strange bean to produce a birthday cake. Returning to his home, he finds Randalf waiting in his living room. Randalf remarks on Billboy's impressive height, his fine clothing, and his luxuriously appointed home, knowing they have come from the bean, and warns his friend of using such things lightly. Billboy concedes that the bean has given him almost everything he could want. He then announces that he is leaving the shire due to dissatisfaction and bequeathing everything he owns, including the bean, to his nephew, Toto (Junior Asparagus). Waiting for Toto, Randalf relates that Billboy has departed and draws his attention to the bean. Toto is curious as to why he would want a bean and Randalf describes the origin of a magical bean that could produce clothing, consumables, and small kitchen appliances, and also change your appearance. After verifying the bean's authenticity from an inscription left after warming it in the fire, Toto is unsure about accepting such a gift and tries to pass it off to Randalf. However, Randalf explains that one cannot choose his gifts and must determine for himself how they should best be used. He then suggests that Toto travel to the Elders of the Razzberry Forest for insight with some friends that he has already gathered to assist with the journey: the ranger, Ear-a-Corn (Larry the Cucumber), the elf, Leg-O-Lamb (Jimmy Gourd), the dwarf, Grumpy (Pa Grape), and Leg-O-Lamb's brother (Jerry Gourd) who had nothing better to do. They trek through the Mountains of Much Snowia and eventually reach the Razzberry Forest. There, Randalf warns the others not to laugh because the elders have lost their sense of humor. The elders welcome them and inform Randalf that they must travel to the Land of Woe. The others burst into laughter upon hearing the greetings and native tongue of the Elders, which involves blowing raspberries. This gets them sentenced to detention on a platform forever until an eagle saves them and they escape. Leaving the forest, they emerge near the entrance to the Land of Woe. After opening the door, they realize that Toto is the only one small enough to fit through and he proceeds alone. However, the remainder of the group soon learns that a group of sporks, minions of the evil Scaryman (Scallion #1), are after Toto in order to seize the bean for their master. The fellowship then goes in pursuit. In the Land of Woe, Toto encounters a strange creature named Ahem (Mr. Lunt), who reveals that he was once a normal flobbit like Toto and the former owner of the bean. Ahem then agrees to accompany Toto into Woe as a guide. Meanwhile, the others charge through the Red Gate, only to be trapped by the Sporks. The other elf (who resembles the Keebler elf) then bakes cookies in a tree and gives them to the Sporks who have not eaten anything for days and the fellowship journeys on. Toto and Ahem arrive in Woe to find a desperate people lacking the most basic necessities, such as food and water. Ahem wants Toto to leave them, to use the bean for his own creature comforts, but Toto recognizes that he can use it to help the people of Woe. The fellowship arrives just ahead of Scaryman, who steals the bean. However, Billboy suddenly reappears, recovering the bean and returning it to Toto. Toto throws the bean into the well, bringing water back to the Land of Woe and restoring it to its fertile and beautiful state. Silly Song: "Silly Songs with Elves" ("My Baby Elf") Featured Music Video: "It's About Love" performed by Wynonna Judd
26	"Sheerluck Holmes and the Golden Ruler"	March 11, 2006
The video features two stories all about friendship. In the first story, Don Quixote (Archibald Asparagus) dreams he is facing three Peas in a world made of cooking utensils and foods. He and his best friend, Poncho (Mr. Lunt), work in a Mexican restaurant of Cafe LaMancha. However, Jean-Claude Pea comes in to inform the duo of a new restaurant opening across the street called the Food Factory, the most successful restaurant in the world. Don is sure they will go out of business. Don assumes his latest dream has informed him to try different themes to win back their customers. This fails, and shortly after, the Food Factory manager (Mr. Nezzer) offers Poncho a job at the Food Factory, but Poncho refuses. Don's next dream convinces him to attack the Food Factory, only to end up in jail. While visiting Don in prison, Poncho learns that salsa is causing Don's bad dreams, so he weans Don off the salsa. The next morning, Don claims he slept well. Bob claims that he will let Don go if he quits the salsa. Poncho has an idea to open their restaurant for breakfast, as the Food Factory does not open until lunchtime. The second story opens up to Sheerluck (Larry the Cucumber) and Watson (Bob the Tomato) arriving at Doylie's Cafe to great applause. Both of them claim they have their latest case wrapped up. However, Sheerluck takes all the credit, upsetting Watson. After leaving, Scooter informs the duo of a plot to steal the Golden Ruler. At the palace, they meet up with the prime minister (Archibald Asparagus) and find clues. The police, Fish and Chips (Mr. Lunt and Mr. Nezzer), want to solve the case themselves. Back at Doylie's, when Sheerluck takes the credit again for finding the clues, Watson leaves, saying to Sheerluck, "When you want to start treating me like a friend, come talk to me." The next morning, at Sheerluck's apartment, Scooter informs him that the Golden Ruler has been stolen. He arrives at Watson's apartment, only to be battered by Watson's maids. Back at the palace, Sheerluck is clueless without Watson. He finally realizes his mistake and Watson appears, he has been disguised as one of the palace guards. He explains the clues and says the thief is disguised as a guard. The prime minister cannot match any of them to the crime. Sheerluck trips and accidentally reveals the culprit (Phillipe Pea), who is then arrested. Back at Doylie's, Sheerluck gives Watson full credit for solving the case. Silly Song: "Gated Community" performed by Matthew West and Matthew Ward Awards: This episode won a Parents' Choice Award. NOTE: This is the last episode released on VHS.
27	"LarryBoy and the Bad Apple"	July 29, 2006
The third Larry-Boy tale in the Veggietales series, this video features a story about temptation and resisting it. Bumblyburg is preparing to celebrate its 300th birthday. However, there is one concern about a mysterious web that has appeared around the statue of Obadiah Bumbly in the town square. While the townspeople fret and prepare for the celebration, LarryBoy is in the Larry-Mobile on his way back to the Larry-Cave, snacking on chocolate truffles. His butler, Alfred (Archibald Asparagus), reminds him that eating too much chocolate will make him sick and compromise his abilities as a superhero. Back at the cave, LarryBoy becomes sick and admits that he can't control his chocolate addiction. With help from Alfred, he begins a new diet-and-exercise routine. Meanwhile, a mysterious villain apple named the Bad Apple is formulating a plan to derail the city's celebration. Her strategy is to enslave everyone by their own personal temptations, allowing her to take over the city of Bumblyburg while everybody is incapacitated. She tasks her sidekick, Curly the Worm, with identifying the weaknesses of each of the city's most important citizens: Mayor Blueberry, Reporter Petunia, and LarryBoy, for she believes that eliminating these three will cripple the city's leadership, communication, and law enforcement. She begins by paying a visit to Mayor Blueberry, whose weakness is vanity. Bad Apple preys on this weakness by convincing her that as a representative of Bumblyburg, it is her duty to look her best and spins a web in which she claims there are countless beautiful things to improve the mayor's appearance. Her vanity validated, the Mayor steps into the trap. Next, she pays a visit to Petunia, whose weakness is playing video games. Petunia realizes her important role in keeping the city informed, but admits that she could use a break. Bad Apple spins another trap, this one containing a test version of the latest, unreleased video game system. Unable to resist the temptation, Petunia steps into the trap to play. Meanwhile, back at the Larry-Cave, Alfred has discovered that the mysterious webs have plagued Bumblyburg before. On an old scratchy film reel, he learns that an apple named Ephraim Apply tried to ensnare the settlers of the new town with diversions at an establishment called Apply's Funhouse. The people succumbed and the town suffered until Obadiah Bumbly arrived in time to liberate the people and banish Ephraim Apply forever. The Bad Apple pays a visit to LarryBoy, and, having learned of his weakness for chocolate, uses it to gain entrance to the Larry-Cave. Little by little, she dampens his resolve until he too falls into a trap designed specifically for him. With Larry indisposed in the "Chocolate Room", she easily breaks Alfred upon his return, ensnaring him by the television in front of his favorite cartoon. With Bumblyburg's leaders and heroes out of the way, the Bad Apple proceeds to the town square to fulfill her great-uncle Ephraim's destiny: opening up the new and improved "Apply's Funhouse II". She and Curly begin to lure the helpless citizens into the funhouse. At the Larry-Cave, Alfred and LarryBoy realize that they need each other's help to fight the temptation. Working together, they dissolve the webs of their traps, then quickly set out to rescue Mayor Blueberry and Petunia. They then all rush to the town square to fight temptation together. As LarryBoy fights the Bad Apple, the funhouse topples and nearly crushes a mother and her baby. LarryBoy saves them and all of Bumblyburg by flinging the funhouse, along with the Bad Apple and Curly, out of the square and out of the city. Silly Song: Replaced with a music video "Rock On, LarryBoy". Award: This episode also won a Parents' Choice Award. NOTE: This is the first episode released on Blu-Ray.
28	"Gideon: Tuba Warrior"	November 4, 2006
The video features two stories about trusting God, even in the toughest times. The first story is narrated by the captain of the Pirates Who Don't Do Anything (Pa Grape), as he tells it through the eyes of his ancestor Great-Grandfather Simon, a reporter for the Bristol Snoop, a tabloid-like newspaper. He goes to George Müller's (Archibald Asparagus) orphanage and asks him nonsense questions ("Is it true you are running a school for alien dolphins?", "This is a turkey with the head of a cat") until he comes in with Muller to find that the orphanage is out of food and the orphans cannot eat breakfast the next day. The next day when Simon visits, they pray to God for food. When Simon offers to go out and buy them food, the baker and the milkman (Jimmy and Jerry Gourd) miraculously come in and offers the children milk and bread. The second story, an adaptation of the biblical story of Gideon from the Book of Judges, is played featuring Larry the Cucumber in the title role. Beginning with a montage of floats, as a victory parade for conquering the Midianites, Gideon stops the parade to explain that the large amount of praise lavished on him was not his to take. He then tells the "true" account, in which he reluctantly chooses to defend his country against an undefeated army of the Midianites after an angel (Pa Grape) appears to him. Initially, he doesn't want to, and says that he's not a warrior, that he's afraid of the dark and screams like a girl, to which the angel says, "He the Almighty chose you", "to say the truth I'm afraid of the dark too", and "Put me in the dark and I scream like a girl too." Gideon then asks for the miracle of a wet fleece and dry ground. When the sign is complete, asks for another sign that the fleece be dry and the ground around drenched. This sign is completed too and Gideon accepts his job. When Gideon's sizable army is reduced to six carrots and six peas, he is able to defeat the Midianites with horns and flashlights. Silly Song: Replaced with "Ukulele Karaoke with Bob" ("Lance the Turtle") Note: Big Idea had the Pirates Who Don't Do Anything host the episode to announce the second VeggieTales film The Pirates Who Don't Do Anything: A VeggieTales Movie.
29	"Moe and the Big Exit"	March 3, 2007
A sequel to The Ballad of Little Joe all about following directions. The story is an adaptation of the biblical story of Moses from the Book of Exodus. Since the events, the brothers' descendants have "multiplied like prairie dogs" in Dodgeball City. Moe (Larry the Cucumber), as one of those descendants, is a cowboy living a privileged life while his relatives are enslaved and forced to dig the Grand Canyon. After Moe stands up to a foreman who is over his family, he ends up accidentally causing the official to be sent up the river. Feeling guilt and fearing for his safety, Moe escapes to the Rockies. Later, he runs from a bear and jumps into a well only to be pulled out by a Native American girl named Sally (Petunia Rhubarb) and her buffalo Zippy. Moe soon meets Sally's parents (Pa and Ma Grape) and eventually the two marry. Some years later, a "burning tumbleweed" appears before Moe, telling him to return to Dodgeball City, where his people will be saved. Talking to the tumbleweed and finding that his walking stick Sliver turns into a rattlesnake, Moe explains that he cannot speak in public. The tumbleweed then tells him that someone will be sent to speak for him. Moe then sets off for Dodgeball City wearing a masked costume so as to not be recognized. While going through the desert, he finds his brother Aaron (Archibald Asparagus) who works as a souvenir salesman. Arriving in Dodgeball City with Aaron, Moe, under the alias "the Lone Stranger", tells the mayor (Mr. Nezzer) to "let my people go". However, the mayor rejects his demands, but trouble for the town and mayor soon ensues (such as rivers turning into tomato juice, a plague of prairie dogs, grasshoppers eating the mayor's lunch, and other plagues that follow the biblical account of Moses). Finally, the mayor lets Moe's relatives leave after the firstborn boys of Dodgeball City are taken away by the river. However, after discovering that the Lone Stranger was Moe, he has second thoughts and he and his gang chase after them. Using his stick, Moe makes it snow momentarily, but the snow soon melts leaving the mayor and his gang on the hot ground in the frying sun. Sally and her family run to Moe and the two are reunited. Moe then leads everyone to start their new lives after having led them out of Dodgeball City. Silly Song: "A Mess Down in Egypt" with Boyz in the Sink
30	"The Wonderful Wizard of Ha's"	October 6, 2007
This story about forgiveness is an adaptation of the Parable of the Prodigal Son from the Gospel of Luke, with the story’s elements parodying the L. Frank Baums book The Wonderful Wizard of Oz. Darby (Junior Asparagus) resides at the O'Gill farm and is the son of a Kansas floss farmer (Dad Asparagus), who just wants to have fun. When he learns about the Wonderful Land Of Ha's, a fancy amusement park, and its mysterious wizard (Archibald Asparagus) who promises to make his dreams come true, Darby is determined to go with the money his dad had saved for college. With his pet pig, Tutu, by his side, Darby flees the cornfields and sets for the Land Of Ha's as a tornado sweeps them away. Along the way he meets a scarecrow (Mr. Lunt), a tin man (Larry the Cucumber), and a lion (Pa Grape), each with their own dreams. He also meets a mean boy (Gourdon) with a munchie-eating truck. The group soon runs out of money and are forced to leave the Land of Ha's. The wizard tells Darby that he is just a businessman who used his wizard identity to make money. Disappointed, Darby is unsure what to do as he is afraid that his father will hate him for wasting his college money. When Darby threatens to tell the world the truth about the Land of Ha's, the wizard dumps him in a wastehole. Darby's friends eventually rescue him and publicly humiliate the fake wizard once they soak the mean boy and his parents take him home. Darby sadly leaves his friends and goes back home. Seeing his dad, Darby apologizes and offers to become his slave if he will only take him back, but his father refuses his offer and accepts him back as his son. Silly Song: "Monkey"
31	"Tomato Sawyer and Huckleberry Larry's Big River Rescue"	July 12, 2008
A loose adaptation of the popular Mark Twain books that tells a story about helping others. Bob the Tomato is Tomato Sawyer (Tom Sawyer) and Larry the Cucumber is Huckleberry Larry (Huckleberry Finn), with George making an appearance as the narrator "Clark Wayne". Award: This episode won a Parents' Choice Award. Silly Song: "The Biscuit of Zazzamarandabo"
32	"Abe and the Amazing Promise"	February 7, 2009
The main story is an adaptation of the biblical story of Abraham from the Book of Genesis. Junior Asparagus is eager for the new show production to be finished. Bob the Tomato reads a letter about waiting by directing a Bible-times interview with Abraham (Pa Grape), Sarah and their son, Isaac. Bob and Junior use imagination to travel. Their patience is tested by spitting camels, a confused nurse (Miss Achmetha), an easily distracted film crew (The French Peas), and others. This episode's second segment is "Blunders in Boo-Boo-Ville". It is nearing the time of the great Boo-Boo-Bird Festival, but there have not been any Boo-Boo Birds spotted in the town for a long time. The festival is in danger of being cancelled if the town's residents cannot come up with a way to attract the birds back to their city. Jacques (Larry the Cucumber) learns a lesson about taking his time to make sure things are done correctly when an attempt to bring back the boo-boo birds does not go smoothly. One of his inventions goes awry, creating a rift in his friendship with Maurice (Bob the Tomato). He must embark on his next task alone. He learns his lesson from a scientist and inventor (Charlie Pincher). Guest Star: Delilah Rene as Sarah Silly Song: "Sneeze If You Need To"
33	"Minnesota Cuke and the Search for Noah's Umbrella"	August 4, 2009
This story’s lesson is about displaying confidence, even during ridicule. The story opens with a child, Minnesota Cuke, chasing after the three Scallions who have stolen the Muskie of '47. Minn manages to retrieve the Muskie before the Scallions steal it back. The scene then shifts to an adult Minnesota, who is still trying to retrieve the Muskie but continues to fail. Later, Mr. Humphry Muffet sends Minn on a quest around the world in search for Noah's Ark to keep in his backyard as a tourist attraction. Minnesota learns of the mysterious and powerful relic, "Noah's Umbrella". He teams up with his girlfriend, Julia (Petunia Rhubarb), to find his former arch-enemy, Professor Rattan, who was originally sent on the quest by Muffet, but has been missing for several days. Minn goes to find the ark before Rattan's twin brother, Wicker, uses the umbrella for his own schemes. Wicker wants the umbrella to control weather and force people to pay him for heat, rain, and cold weather, and eventually rule the world, believing that rain came from the umbrella. Minnesota is afraid that people will still laugh at him and fails to carry out some of the steps. Minn has the help of a few friends, but he will need to overcome his fear of what others think if he is going to unlock the mystery of the umbrella. Minnesota rescues Rattan who has been kidnapped by Wicker and they escape to a tavern on a large snowy mountain and perform a song "Arise and Shine" for a clue. They are once again captured by Wicker who locks them up. They escape when Minnesota does the right thing. They catch up with Wicker and his men in a tunnel from the tavern, but are again caught when they reach a dead end inside the mountain. Wicker ties up Rattan and Julia to force Minnesota to choose between helping him get the umbrella or a deadly avalanche over Julia and Rattan. Minnesota reluctantly agrees to help Wicker and passes three tests about doing the right thing as Wicker and his men follow but laugh at him. After passing the tests, Minnesota finds a series of umbrellas on a shelf inside the mountain. Minnesota recognizes that a colorful checkered umbrella is the artifact and Wicker tries to use it to control the weather but learns that the umbrella does not have the power, causing his own army to mock him. Wicker's whining about not getting his way causes an avalanche forcing them to retreat with the umbrella, as Julia and Rattan barely escape being squashed by the falling ice and snow before the entire group flees back to the tavern where Mr. Muffet and two Mountie agents arrest Wicker and his army. The umbrella is then made a protected artifact. Muffet wonders where the ark is and they conclude it has rotted away after thousands of years. It is revealed that the tavern is the ark. Silly Song: "Sippy Cup" Note: This is the last video to use the original VeggieTales opening and the original countertop.
34	"Saint Nicholas: A Story of Joyful Giving"	October 6, 2009
The story starts off with Laura's dad's truck breaking down. The mechanic, Gustav, will only fix it for double the normal price. Everyone sings about Christmas presents and Bob asks Junior Asparagus what Christmas is about, and Larry points to the nativity set. Junior Asparagus asks Bob what Santa has to do with Jesus, and Bob starts telling the story of Saint Nicholas. Nick is at church and afterwards, he and his dad go fishing. While they are there, they see a historical counterpart Gustav firing a man who has no food, and Nick's dad gives him the fish they caught. That night, Nick's parents go to help a sick person, but because of a plague affecting the village, they too get sick and die. Distraught and helpless to assist his neighbors, Nick sails to Bethlehem, where he hears about Jesus, and goes back to Greece to live out his parents' legacy. While there, he disguises himself and gives coins to three girls to pay the fine, because Gustav had become the mayor and made a rule against giving people free gifts, and they had broken this rule. Then Bob ends the story when the girls get the coins, and the entire town gives money to help fix Laura's dad's truck, and Gustav even has a change of heart, finishing the deliveries himself, so Laura and her family can have a merry Christmas. The town surprises them in secret with a Christmas tree at their house, and leaves content that they have spread Christmas cheer. Silly Song: Replaced with "Helpful Humanitarian Songs with Mr. Lunt" ("Donuts for Benny") Music Video "Give this Christmas Away" performed by Matthew West and Amy Grant Note: Big Idea produced this video to announce VeggieTales partnership with Operation Christmas Child and to inform families of the charity's mission.
The 2010s
35	"Pistachio: The Little Boy That Woodn't"	February 20, 2010
The story is an adaptation of the biblical story of the Good Shepherd from the Gospel of John, and the fairy tale Pinocchio. Gelato (Larry the Cucumber) is a lonely toy maker who has three ducklings and a caterpillar named Cricket (Khalil), but wants a child of his own. Gelato then gets pistachio wood from his neighbor Parcheesi (Pa Grape) and uses it to carve a boy. After a night of work, Pistachio (Junior Asparagus) comes to life with the help of the blue fairy (Madame Blueberry). Bristling under Gelato's guidance, Pistachio leaves home and goes on amazing, but troublemaking adventures before realizing his folly and coming home to Gelato. Guest Stars: Trevor Devall as Espresso and Lee Tockar as Milano and Dorito Silly Song: "Obscure Broadway Show Tunes with Larry" ("Where Have All the Staplers Gone?") Note: This is the very first video to feature the new Qwerty and kitchen design as well as the new VeggieTales theme song. Note 2: This is the last VeggieTales episode to have Phil Vischer as a writer.
36	"Sweetpea Beauty: A Girl After God's Own Heart"	July 31, 2010
In the first story, Bob narrates the story of Snooderella (the third Dr. Seuss homage). The titular character is clumsy and awkward, unlike her valley girl-esque sisters, who are snobbish and aloof. She is pushed around by her "stepsnoodle" and believes that if she were pretty, she would be happy and loved. For the grand ball, her "step-snoodle" hires a godmother to give Snooderella a magical makeover, warning her that the magic will wear off at midnight. Everyone at the ball is enchanted by her beauty, but Snooderella still feels ugly and unloved. At midnight, the magic wears off, back to herself and all alone, she turns to go home. The king, who asks to dance with her, tells her that he delights in her beauty and good heart, and reassures her that she is loved. From that day on Snoodlerella is more confident. The second story is "Sweetpea Beauty". An old law says that only the most beautiful person in the kingdom can rule. At the yearly "Most Fair Faire", the most beautiful person is to be named. This year the minstrels mock Queen Blueberry (Madame Blueberry), saying that she is no longer fit to be the queen. The queen is determined to remain the queen and against the recommendation of her advisers, the Scallions, and she activates her magic mirror. The mirror comes to life and tells the queen that Sweetpea Beauty (Petunia Rhubarb), a kind girl who sees the beauty and worth in everything, is the only obstacle keeping her from remaining the queen. Silly Song: Replaced with "Veggie Shopping Network" ("Pants") Featured Music Video: "Beautiful for Me" performed by Nichole Nordeman
37	"It's a Meaningful Life"	October 2, 2010
In a plot taken from It's A Wonderful Life, Stewart Green (Larry the Cucumber) is the star of the football team in his hometown. Morty Bumble (Mr. Lunt), Stewart's teammate, is always used as a decoy during plays. Stewart is about to make the winning touchdown when he trips over Bumble. Bumble accidentally catches the football, causing his teammates to see him as the town hero. Bumble leaves to play major league football. Fifteen years later, Stewart has inherited his father's toy train company and coaches the town's youth football team. He is married to Donna (Petunia Rhubarb), and has three kids. The toy factory he owns is threatened with closure by Bumble, now a famous football star. Stewart wonders "What if things were different?" and a train magically appears in front of Stewart. The conductor whisks him away to see what would have happened if Stewart had caught the football. Stewart discovers life is not what he had imagined. Since he went off to football stardom, the town has become practically deserted, his wife never married, his twins were never born, and his daughter was never adopted and spent the rest of her childhood in an orphanage. The conductor gives Stewart one last choice: he can either stay in the world of "What if" or go back home to face his problems. Stewart chooses to go home. Returning home, Stewart finds the entire town working in his factory making toys in order to save it. Overjoyed, he declares his life is meaningful. Silly Song: Replaced with "Bedtime Songs with Junior" ("Goodnight Junior") Featured Music Video: "Meant To Be" performed by Steven Curtis Chapman
38	"'Twas The Night Before Easter"	March 8, 2011
It's Easter time in Crisper County and cable news reporter Marlee Meade (Petunia Rhubarb) is hunting for a way to help others. She cooks up a plan to save the old theater with a cast of costume-clad townies, massive props and a 20-foot robot rabbit to perform "Up With Bunnies". Now there's only one thing missing - the star of the show! When word spreads that singing sensation Cassie Cassava (Melinda Doolittle) is arriving to perform in her hometown church's Easter service, Marlee schemes to steal the starlet for her own pageant! But when things go haywire, will it be curtains for Marlee's dreams - or will she discover the true meaning of Easter and what helping others is really all about? Guest Star: Melinda Doolittle as Cassie Cassava Silly Song: Replaced with "The Latest Craze Dance with Jean Claude and Phillipe" ("Hopperena")
39	"Princess and the Popstar"	August 16, 2011
Princess Poppyseed (Laura Carrot) is a farm girl who yearns for the life of the famous popstar, Vanna Banana (also played by Laura). One day, the two meet and notice how they look very much alike and decide to switch lives in an attempt to live their dreams. The lesson is being who God made you to be. Silly Song: Replaced with "The History of Fashion with Archibald" ("Astonishing Wigs") Featured Music Video: "You Never Are" performed by Francesca Battistelli
40	"The Little Drummer Boy"	October 4, 2011
The plot and action are taken directly from the Rankin/Bass stop motion animated Christmas special of the same name, with some elements from the biblical Nativity of Jesus. Silly Song: Replaced with "VeggieTales Christmas Party" ("The Eight Polish Foods of Christmas") Featured Music Video: The Little Drummer Boy performed by BeBe & CeCe Winans
41	"Robin Good and His Not-So-Merry Men"	March 6, 2012
In "Lenny and the Lost Birthday" (the fourth Dr. Seuss homage), Lenny Laboe (Junior Asparagus) is having a bad birthday. His friends forgot his birthday, his dog ate his breakfast, he's been humiliated in the cafeteria, he got two hours of detention, his sister gets a prize in her Corn Flakes, and he had to watch his sister's television show on the way to school. Going to bed feeling sad and crying, his mother reassures him that things will get better. Lenny then tells his mom that he thought it was his birthday, but she tells him that since it was a leap year, his birthday isn't until tomorrow. The second story is about Robin Good and His Not-So-Merry Men. In the faraway town of Bethlingham in 1250 AD England, a band of merry men, led by Robin Good (Larry the Cucumber) helps people by fundraising from the rich and giving to the poor. The prince starts stealing the townspeople's hams and keeping them for himself, donations go down and Robin's friends decide that robbing from the rich is good. The prince invites Robin to dinner but starts to eat everything himself. Robin's friends arrive and steal the hams. The prince accuses Robin of the crime and threatens to put him in jail with the sheriff. Robin decides to save the sheriff and bring his friends back to the side of good. Silly Song: "Bubble Rap" with Boyz in the Sink and Khalil
42	"The Penniless Princess"	August 14, 2012
The main story is an adaptation of the A Little Princess. Sara Crewe moves from Africa to London with her father. He goes off to war, so he sends her to a prestigious boarding school where she is under the strict direction of the headmistress. She is bullied by her classmates and becomes friends with an eccentric girl and one of the young servants. Sara is notified of the death of her father and as the loss of his fortune, but is allowed to stay at the boarding school but as a servant. She shares the food she receives with others and reads the Bible to her friends. One of her father's friends searches for her unsuccessfully. Later, he befriends a poor servant girl that lives next door, only to find out that it is Sara and adopts her. Guest Star: Anna Grace Stewart as Sara Crewe Silly Song: Replaced with "Silly Songs with Best Friends Forever" ("Best Friends Forever") Note: This is the first episode to be released after DreamWorks bought Big Idea Entertainment.
43	"The League of Incredible Vegetables"	October 16, 2012
Thingamabob (Bob the Tomato), Vogue (Petunia Rhubarb), S-Cape (Mr. Lunt) and Ricochet (Junior Asparagus) all reveal their superhero personas to LarryBoy and Alfred (Archibald Asparagus), and team up to take on Dr. Flurry, who is determined to freeze the town in fear. Silly Song: "Silly Songs with LarryBoy" ("Supper Hero") Featured Music Video: "The League of Incredible Vegetables" performed by Newsboys
44	"The Little House That Stood"	March 5, 2013
The main story is an adaptation of the Parable of the Wise and the Foolish Builders. The three pigs are looking for a building contractor. Larry the Cucumber builds with hay and Mr. Lunt builds with bricks. Only Bob the Tomato follows plans from the Master Builder's Handbook. Silly Song: "Happy Tooth Day"
45	"MacLarry and the Stinky Cheese Battle"	July 30, 2013
One of two feuding clans plans a big prank. When it goes wrong, MacLarry (Larry the Cucumber) helps them resolve their differences. Its theme is getting along with others. Silly Song: "Silly Songs with Scottish Larry" ("Stilts and Kilts")
46	"Merry Larry and the True Light of Christmas"	October 22, 2013
As Head Elf at the mall, Larry the Cucumber discovers that Mrs. Crespie's house burned down, and he's determined to get her a new one by creating a light show that will attract the people from the town. Meanwhile, Phillip Fleagle (Bob the Tomato) and his employee Mr. Lunt only care about creating a spectacular holiday display for the Mall King's (Archibald Asparagus) mall. Its theme is the true light of Christmas. The video is narrated by Si Robertson of Duck Dynasty fame who appears as the mall janitor in the tradition of the early 1970s Rankin/Bass Christmas specials and their use of celebrity narrators. Guest Star: Si Robertson as Silas Okra Silly Song: "Wrapped Myself Up for Christmas" Featured Music Video: Light of Christmas performed by Owl City and Toby Mac
47	"Veggies in Space: The Fennel Frontier"	March 11, 2014
Captain Cuke (Larry the Cucumber), Mr. Spork (Bob the Tomato), and the rest of the crew of the USS Applepies are sent to stop the evil space pirate, Luntar the Looter (Mr. Lunt). Its theme is the power of sharing. Silly Song: "Asteroid Cowboys" Featured Music Video: "Enough to Share" performed by Jamie Grace
48	"Celery Night Fever"	August 5, 2014
In the video, a determined young girl (Laura Carrot) sets out to save the city park from being turned into a parking lot by getting her grandfather Lanny Wilson (Larry the Cucumber) to stage a reunion concert with the Groovy Brothers, the disco band he headlined forty years ago. The problem? None of those guys are talking to each other as they all hold a grudge from when the band fell apart. Its theme is forgiveness. Guest Star: Terry Crews as Bruce Onion and Terry Turnip Silly Song: "Perfect Puppy"
49	"Beauty and the Beet"	October 14, 2014
Mirabelle (voiced by Kellie Pickler) and her traveling family band, the Veggie Tones, are on their way to a career-making gig at Vegetable Square Garden. However, their car breaks down in a snowstorm and ends up in a ditch, so the family is stranded at a ski resort for the winter, which stalls their plans. Worse, Mirabelle's father angers the hotel's cranky manager, Mr. Beet (voiced by Rob Paulsen), and they are forced to cook, clean and sing to pay for their room and board. Mirabelle tries to keep her family's spirits up while also trying to cheer up Mr. Beet and his staff. The video is a twist on the classic Beauty and the Beast story and its theme is unconditional love. Guest Stars: Kellie Pickler as Mirabelle and Rob Paulsen as Mr. Beet Silly Song: "Mac and Cheese" Featured Music Video: "Deck the Halls"
50	"Noah's Ark"	March 3, 2015
Noah (Pa Grape) and his family along with a zoo full of animals take an adventure aboard an orange slice ark. After forty days and nights of rain, everyone's faith has been tested, and Noah's son, Shem ready to jump ship. Will he chart a new course, or will he remember to trust God's promises along with his family? Guest Stars: Wayne Brady as Shem, Jaci Velasquez as Sadie, and Tress MacNeille as Petunia Rubarb, Madame Blueberry, Junior Asparagus and Laura Carrot Silly Song: "My Golden Egg" Note: This is the last video of the series, but the only episode to use the new character designs from the Netflix series VeggieTales in the House and its sequel series, VeggieTales in the City. The characters would later revert to their classic designs in post-Netflix media.

== Theatrical films ==
Title	Directed by	Written by	Co-production	Distributor	Release date (U.S.)
Jonah: A VeggieTales Movie	Phil Vischer and Mike Nawrocki	Phil Vischer and Mike Nawrocki	F·Ĥ·E Pictures	Artisan Entertainment	October 4, 2002
Bob the Tomato and Dad Asparagus are driving Veggie children to see the popular singer "Twippo" in concert. During the drive, Laura taunts the other children because she won a backstage pass, which particularly annoys Junior. When the singing Veggies encounter some car trouble, they are stranded at an old, rundown seafood joint where nothing is quite as it seems. As Bob the Tomato, Dad Asparagus, and the kids settle in to wait for a tow truck to help get their van back on the road, Bob blames Dad Asparagus for the crash and Junior argues with Laura about losing her pass during the crash. They soon meet "The "Pirates Who Don't Do Anything" share a little story, an adaptation of the biblical story of Jonah and the whale. Jonah was a messenger except his messages came straight from God. Jonah loves his job, until the day comes when he has to deliver a message to the people of Nineveh. Instead of carrying out his mission, Jonah turns and sets sail in the opposite direction onboard a pirate ship. Soon Jonah embarks on an adventure that leads him into the belly of a whale, and to the heart of Nineveh for a lesson in compassion and mercy.
The Pirates Who Don't Do Anything: A VeggieTales Movie	Mike Nawrocki	Phil Vischer	Starz Animation	Universal Pictures	January 11, 2008
Three lazy misfits - very timid Elliot (Larry the Cucumber), lazy Sedgewick (Mr. Lunt) and no self-confident George (Pa Grape) - dream of the day of putting on a show about pirates. With their own problems of might not having this dream come true, they soon find themselves traveling back in time into the 17th century and begin a quest to rescue a royal family from an evil tyrant, and learn about being pirates.

== Compilation videos ==
=== Collections ===
1. Lessons From The Sock Drawer (May 6, 2008): Includes various "Veggie Vault" Silly Songs, shorts, and briefs including Binky the Opera Singer, Dr. Jiggle & Mr. Sly, The Story of St. Patrick, Paco and The Singing Aardvark, Gated Community, Paco and the Chicken, The Englishman Who Went Up The Hill, Larry's High Silk Hat, Larry's Lagoon, Modern Major General, Forgive-O-Matic, Larry's Blues, Going Up, Omelet, and Lunch
2. The Bumblyburg Super-Hero Value Pack: Includes Larry-Boy! And the Fib from Outer Space!, Larry-Boy and the Rumor Weed, Dave and the Giant Pickle (first Larry-Boy Appearance), and all four episodes of Larryboy: The Cartoon Adventures.
3. LarryBoy Superhero Power Pack: Includes Larry-Boy! And the Fib from Outer Space!, Larry-Boy and the Rumor Weed, LarryBoy and the Bad Apple, the 16 Feature Songs of LarryBoy: The New Soundtrack! CD and all four episodes of Larryboy: The Cartoon Adventures.
4. The Ultimate Christmas Collection: Includes The Toy That Saved Christmas, The Star of Christmas, Saint Nicholas: A Story of Joyful Giving, the 25 Favorite Christmas Songs! CD, Christmas Sing-Along Songs!, It's a Meaningful Life, and The Little Drummer Boy.
5. A Very Veggie Easter Collection: Includes An Easter Carol, Twas The Night Before Easter, and the songs from CD collections "A Very Veggie Easter" and "Hosanna!".
6. The Complete Silly Song Collection: Includes Very Silly Songs!, The End of Silliness? and The Ultimate Silly Song Countdown.
7. VeggieTales: 30 Episodes DVD Set: Includes Where's God When I'm S-Scared?, God Wants Me to Forgive Them!?!, Are You My Neighbor?, Larry-Boy! And the Fib from Outer Space!, Larry-Boy and the Rumor Weed, LarryBoy and the Bad Apple, The Toy That Saved Christmas, The Star of Christmas, Saint Nicholas: A Story of Joyful Giving, King George and the Ducky, Esther... The Girl Who Became Queen, Duke and the Great Pie War, Minnesota Cuke and the Search for Samson's Hairbrush, Minnesota Cuke and the Search for Noah's Umbrella, Sheerluck Holmes and the Golden Ruler, Rack, Shack and Benny, Dave and the Giant Pickle, Josh and the Big Wall!, The Ballad of Little Joe, Moe and the Big Exit, Tomato Sawyer and Huckleberry Larry's Big River Rescue, It's a Meaningful Life, Sweetpea Beauty: A Girl After God's Own Heart, The Wonderful Wizard of Ha's, Sumo of the Opera, Gideon: Tuba Warrior, Abe and the Amazing Promise, Lyle the Kindly Viking, A Snoodle's Tale and Pistachio - The Little Boy That Woodn't.
8. All the Shows Volume 1 1993–2000: Includes "Where's God When I'm S-Scared", "God Wants Me to Forgive Them!?!", "Are You My Neighbor?", "Rack, Shack and Benny", "Dave and the Giant Pickle", "The Toy That Saved Christmas", "Larry-Boy! And the Fib from Outer Space!", "Josh and the Big Wall", "Madame Blueberry" and "Larry-Boy and the Rumor Weed".
9. All the Shows Volume 2 2000–2005: Includes "King George and the Ducky", "Esther: The Girl Who Became Queen", "Lyle the Kindly Viking", "The Star of Christmas", "The Ballad of Little Joe", "An Easter Carol", "A Snoodle's Tale", "Sumo of the Opera", "Duke and the Great Pie War" and "Minnesota Cuke and the Search for Samson's Hairbrush".
10. All the Shows Volume 3 2006–2010: Includes "Sheerluck Holmes and the Golden Ruler", "LarryBoy and the Bad Apple", "Gideon: Tuba Warrior", "Moe and the Big Exit", "Tomato Sawyer and Huckleberry Larry's Big River Rescue", "Abe and the Amazing Promise", "Minnesota Cuke and the Search for Noah's Umbrella", "Saint Nicholas", "Pistachio" and "Sweetpea Beauty".
11. 25th Anniversary 10-Movie Collection: Includes Jonah: A VeggieTales Movie, The Pirates Who Don't Do Anything: A VeggieTales Movie, A Snoodle's Tale, Lyle the Kindly Viking, Pistachio - The Little Boy That Woodn't, Sweetpea Beauty, Sumo of the Opera, Sheerluck Holmes and the Golden Ruler, Robin Good and His Not So Merry Men and The Penniless Princess.
12. The VeggieTales Christmas Classics: Includes The Toy That Saved Christmas, The Star of Christmas, Saint Nicholas: A Story of Joyful Giving, Christmas Sing-Along Songs!, It's a Meaningful Life, The Little Drummer Boy and Merry Larry and the True Light of Christmas.
13. LarryBoy Ultimate Superhero Collection: Includes Larry-Boy! And the Fib from Outer Space!, Larry-Boy and the Rumor Weed, LarryBoy and the Bad Apple, The League of Incredible Vegetables, and all four episodes of Larryboy: The Cartoon Adventures.

=== Double features ===
1. Holiday Double Feature: Includes The Toy that Saved Christmas and The Star of Christmas.
2. Lessons in Telling the Truth and The Power of Words Double Feature: Includes Larry-Boy! And the Fib from Outer Space! and Larry-Boy and the Rumor Weed.
3. Lessons in Thankfulness and Courage Double Feature: Includes Madame Blueberry and Esther... The Girl Who Became Queen.
4. Lessons in Obedience and Selfishness Double Feature: Includes Josh and the Big Wall and King George and the Ducky.
5. Halloween Double Feature: Includes Where's God When I'm S-Scared? and Rack, Shack & Benny.
6. Heroic Legends Double Feature: Includes The League of Incredible Vegetables and Esther... The Girl Who Became Queen.
7. Lessons in Friendship and Facing Hardship Double Feature: Includes Sheerluck Holmes and the Golden Ruler and The Ballad of Little Joe.
8. Silly Songs! Double Feature: Includes Very Silly Songs! and The Ultimate Silly Song Countdown.
9. Good Friends! Double Feature: Includes Rack, Shack & Benny and Tomato Sawyer and Huckleberry Larry's Big River Rescue.
10. Growing Generous Kids!: Includes Lyle the Kindly Viking and King George and the Ducky.
11. Growing Patient Kids!: Includes Abe and the Amazing Promise and Sumo of the Opera.
12. Growing Faithful Kids!: Includes "The Grapes Of Wrath" (from God Wants Me to Forgive Them!?!) and Gideon: Tuba Warrior.
13. Growing Kindhearted Kids!: Includes Tomato Sawyer and Huckleberry Larry's Big River Rescue and Babysitter in De Nile" (from Duke and the Great Pie War)
14. Growing Courageous Kids!: Includes The Ballad of Little Joe and "Bully Trouble" (from Minnesota Cuke and the Search for Samson's Hairbrush).
15. Growing Confident Kids!: Includes Rack, Shack and Benny and A Snoodle's Tale.
16. Movie Time!: Includes Jonah: A VeggieTales Movie & The Pirates Who Don't Do Anything.

=== Triple features ===
1. Bob and Larry's Favorite Stories! (March 31, 1998): Includes Where's God When I'm S-Scared?, God Wants Me to Forgive Them!?!, and Are You My Neighbor?.
2. More of Bob and Larry's Favorite Stories (August 25, 1998): Includes Rack, Shack and Benny, Dave and the Giant Pickle, and Larry-Boy! And the Fib from Outer Space!.
3. Junior's Favorite Stories (November 9, 1999): Includes Josh and the Big Wall!, Very Silly Songs!, and Madame Blueberry.
4. Larry's Favorite Stories (May 23, 2000): Includes Larry-Boy and the Rumor Weed, The End of Silliness, and King George and the Ducky.
5. Classics from the Crisper (September 18, 2001): Includes Esther: The Girl Who Became Queen, Lyle the Kindly Viking, and The Ultimate Silly Song Countdown.
6. "Lions, Shepherds and Queens (Oh My!)" Includes "Daniel and the Lions' Den", "Dave and the Giant Pickle" and "Esther... The Girl Who Became Queen".
7. "Stand Up, Stand Tall, Stand Strong!" Includes "The Story of Flibber-o-Loo", "Rack, Shack and Benny" and "Josh and the Big Wall!"
8. Multi-Feature Super Power Pack: Includes Minnesota Cuke and the Search for Samson's Hairbrush, Sumo of the Opera, and Dave and the Giant Pickle.
9. Girl Power! A VeggieTriple Feature: Includes Madame Blueberry, Duke and the Great Pie War, and Esther: The Girl Who Became Queen.
10. Superhero! A VeggieTriple Feature: Includes Larry-Boy! And the Fib from Outer Space!, Larry-Boy and the Rumor Weed, and LarryBoy and the Bad Apple.
11. Lessons for a Lifetime! A VeggieTriple Feature: Includes Jonah: A VeggieTales Movie, Lyle the Kindly Viking, and Gideon: Tuba Warrior.
12. God Made You Special! (August 11, 2007): Includes "Dave and the Giant Pickle", "The Gourds Must Be Crazy", and "A Snoodle's Tale". Also includes a new short, "Bob's Vacation"
13. "A Baby, A Quest and the Wild Wild West!": Includes "The Ballad of Little Joe", "Babysitter in DeNile" and "Moe and the Big Exit".
14. God Loves You Very Much! A VeggieTriple Feature: Includes "The Ballad of Little Joe", "Gideon, Tuba Warrior", and "Rack, Shack and Benny".
15. "A Silly Little Thing Called Love" A VeggieTale Triple Feature : Includes "The Story of Flibber -o-Loo", "Duke and the Great Pie War", and "Madame Blueberry".
16. "Happy Together": Includes "Sherlock Holmes and the Golden Ruler", "The Grapes of Wrath" and "Esther... The Girl Who Became Queen".
17. Veggie Classics! A VeggieTriple Feature: Includes Where's God When I'm S-Scared?, God Wants Me to Forgive Them!?!, and Are You My Neighbor?.
18. Bible Heroes! A VeggieTriple Feature: Includes Josh and the Big Wall!, Esther... The Girl Who Became Queen, and Moe and the Big Exit.
19. Royalty Collection! A Queen, A King and a Very Blue Berry: Includes Madame Blueberry, King George and the Ducky, and Esther: The Girl Who Became Queen.
20. Adventure Pack! The Search and Rescue Edition!: Includes Minnesota Cuke and the Search for Samson's Hairbrush, Sheerluck Holmes and the Golden Ruler, and Tomato Sawyer and Huckleberry Larry's Big River Rescue.
21. Good Guys! Triple Feature: Includes Dave and the Giant Pickle, Josh and the Big Wall!, and Tomato Sawyer and Huckleberry Larry's Big River Rescue.

=== Quadruple features ===
1. Funtastic Four!: Includes Robin Good, Big River Rescue, Minnesota Cuke and the Search for Noah's Umbrella, and Sheerluck Holmes.
2. Bible Story Collection: Includes King George and the Ducky, Dave and the Giant Pickle, Rack, Shack and Benny and Josh and the Big Wall!
3. Princess Story Collection: Includes Sweetpea Beauty, Esther... The Girl Who Became Queen, The Penniless Princess, and Princess and the Popstar.
4. Bible Heroes - 4 Movie Collection: Includes Noah's Ark, Gideon: Tuba Warrior, Josh and the Big Wall! and King George and the Ducky.
5. Bible Heroes - 4 Movie Collection 2: Includes Moe and the Big Exit, The Ballad of Little Joe, Esther... The Girl Who Became Queen and Dave and the Giant Pickle.
6. Superhero! - 4 Movie Collection: Includes Larry-Boy! And the Fib from Outer Space!, Larry-Boy and the Rumor Weed, LarryBoy and the Bad Apple and The League of Incredible Vegetables.
