= Jonah: A VeggieTales Movie =

- Theatrical release poster
- Directed by: Phil Vischer; Mike Nawrocki
- Written by: Phil Vischer; Mike Nawrocki
- Based on: VeggieTales by Phil Vischer Mike Nawrocki; Book of Jonah
- Produced by: Ameake Owens
- Starring: Phil Vischer; Mike Nawrocki; Tim Hodge
- Edited by: John Wahba
- Music by: Kurt Heinecke; Phil Vischer
- Production companies: Big Idea Productions; F·H·E Pictures
- Distributed by: Artisan Entertainment (Note: In 2018, Universal Pictures (who owns Veggietales under DreamWorks Animation and DreamWorks Classics, the latter who owns Big Idea Entertainment) bought the film from Lionsgate (the owner of Artisan Entertainment, the distributor of the film).)
- Release dates: August 14, 2002 (Hollywood Theater); October 4, 2002 (United States)
- Running time: 83 minutes
- Country: United States
- Language: English
- Budget: $14 million
- Box office: $25.6 million

Jonah: A VeggieTales Movie is a 2002 American animated Christian musical comedy adventure film produced by Big Idea Productions and released by Artisan Entertainment. Written and directed by Phil Vischer and Mike Nawrocki in their feature directorial debuts, it is the first of the two theatrical feature films in the VeggieTales series, before The Pirates Who Don't Do Anything: A VeggieTales Movie (2008).

The themes for the film are compassion and mercy, using two stories as illustrations linked by the Pirates Who Don't Do Anything, who were first seen in the Silly Song of the same name in Very Silly Songs!. The first story takes place in the current day and concerns a mishap with Bob the Tomato and Dad Asparagus on the way to a concert; the second, set in ancient times, is based directly on the biblical story of Jonah. Through both stories, compassion and mercy play a role in giving people a second chance.

Jonah: A VeggieTales Movie premiered on August 14, 2002, and came out as a regular release two months later on October 4. It received generally positive reviews from critics, who praised the humor and narrative style, and grossed $25.6 million against a $14 million production budget, making it the highest-grossing film released by Big Idea Productions. The film came out on VHS and DVD on March 4, 2003, as a worldwide home video release in both full-screen and anamorphic widescreen formats with a two-disc collector's edition. A DVD reprint with the feature and bonus features was released on Blu-ray in 2011 by Lionsgate (Artisan's successor).

== Plot ==
Bob the Tomato and Dad Asparagus are driving Veggie children to see the popular singer "Twippo" in concert. During the drive, Laura taunts the other children because she won a backstage pass, which particularly annoys Junior. Bob briefly loses control of the van after being hit in the back of the head by a guitar, and Laura loses her pass in the chaos. To make matters worse, soon afterwards, a porcupine shoots out two of the van's tires in an attempt to protect her babies, causing the van to veer off the road and careen down a hill, stopping short of a river.

At a nearby restaurant, Bob blames Dad Asparagus for the crash and Junior argues with Laura about losing her pass. Junior is met by The Pirates Who Don't Do Anything, who tell Junior he was being rather tough on his friend and encourage him to show some compassion. To illustrate their point, they tell all the Veggies a story about a man of God named Jonah.

Jonah is a Prophet of ancient Israel who goes from town to town delivering God's messages. One night, God asks him to deliver a message to the people of Nineveh; however, Jonah is unwilling to preach a word of repentance to the Ninevites since they are people of corruption and instead tries to flee from the Lord by having the Pirates sail him to Tarshish. After leaving port, a guilt-stricken Jonah goes below deck to rest where he meets a caterpillar named Khalil.

After experiencing a nightmare, Jonah awakens to find the ship beset by a great storm. Captain Pa Grape concludes the storm has been sent because God is angry at someone on the ship. The group decides to play Go Fish to divine who is at fault. Jonah loses the game and is forced to walk the plank, causing the skies to clear. The Pirates attempt to reel Jonah back in, but before they can do so, he is swallowed by a giant whale. The Pirates attack the whale using a cannon with a bowling ball as ammo, but the whale swallows the ball, disgorges Jonah's lifebelt, and swims away.

Inside the belly of the whale, Khalil, who was hiding inside the bowling ball, finds Jonah, who realizes that he disobeyed God in trying to run from Him and is certain that his death is near. The pair are soon visited by a host of God's angels, who explain if Jonah repents, God will grant him a second chance. Jonah gladly repents, and after spending three days and nights in the belly of the whale, he and Khalil are spat up onto the shore, where they ride Jonah's camel, Reginald, to Nineveh.

After Jonah is denied entrance to the city, the Pirates appear, explaining they won the sweepstakes for their favorite snack food, which is produced in Nineveh. The group is soon arrested after Larry accidentally commits theft, and they are sentenced to death. As a last request, they are granted an audience with King Twistomer. After telling the Ninevites of his whale encounter, Jonah delivers the message given to him by God, telling the Ninevites that they have to repent or Nineveh will be destroyed; King Twistomer and the Ninevites listen to Jonah's message and immediately repent.

Still expecting God to destroy Nineveh for their past sins, Jonah waits from a distance in the hot sun. God provides a plant to shade Jonah, only for Khalil to eat a single leaf off the plant, which kills it. Jonah laments the dead plant, and Khalil is disappointed that Jonah shows more compassion for a plant than the Ninevites. Khalil then tries to explain God is compassionate and merciful and that He wants to give everyone, both Israelites and non-Israelites, a second chance. However, Jonah refuses to accept this, causing Khalil and Reginald to abandon him, ending the story.

Back in the present day, the Veggies are disappointed in the anticlimactic ending, but come to understand the point of the story: God wants everybody to show compassion and mercy, even to those that do not seem to deserve it. Twippo then appears in the restaurant unexpectedly and offers to give everybody a lift to the concert, while Bob forgives Dad Asparagus and Junior gives his Twippo ticket to Laura. The film ends with a song and the arrival of a tow truck driver, who is none other than Khalil.

== Cast ==
- Phil Vischer as Jonah/Twippo (Archibald Asparagus), Pa Grape, Mr. Lunt, Bob the Tomato, Percy Pea, Phillipe Pea, Mr. Nezzer, King Twistomer and Cockney Pea #2
- Mike Nawrocki as Larry the Cucumber, Jean Claude Pea, Jerry Gourd, Cockney Pea #1, Self-Help Tape Voice and BBQ Whooping Pea
- Tim Hodge as Khalil
- Lisa Vischer as Junior Asparagus
- Dan Anderson as Mike Asparagus
- Kristin Blegen as Laura Carrot
- Shelby Vischer as Annie Onion
- Jim Poole as Angus (Scooter) and the Townsperson
- Ron Smith as the City Official and the Crazed Jopponian

== Production ==
In 1999, Phil Vischer proposed a film adaptation of VeggieTales based on the story of Jonah. The film's script and songs were completed soon afterwards. In 2000, Big Idea announced that the film will be released sometime in 2002. A teaser trailer for the film was released with the video Lyle, the Kindly Viking in March 2001. The film was the first to be animated entirely in Autodesk Maya. Before the film's release, Vischer predicted that the film would break even if it grossed $25 million, ultimately ending up grossing just barely over that much, at $25.6 million.

== Music ==
All tracks are written by Mike Nawrocki, Phil Vischer, Kurt Heinecke, and David Mullen.

No.	Title	Instrument(s)	Length
1.	"Billy Joe McGuffrey"	Dan Anderson, Lisa Vischer, Kristin Blegen & Shelby Vischer
2.	"Bald Bunny"	Phil Vischer
3.	"Steak and Shrimp"	Phil Vischer & Mike Nawrocki
4.	"The Pirates Who Don't Do Anything"	Phil Vischer & Mike Nawrocki
5.	"Message from the Lord"	Phil Vischer & Chorus
6.	"It Cannot Be"	Phil Vischer
7.	"Second Chances"	Anointed
8.	"Jonah Was a Prophet"	Phil Vischer & Mike Nawrocki
9.	"In the Belly of the Whale"	Newsboys
10.	"The Credits Song"	Phil Vischer & Mike Nawrocki

== Reception ==
=== Box office ===
Jonah was released on October 4, 2002, in 940 theaters, debuting at sixth place with $6.2 million in its first weekend of release. It fell 40.9% in its second weekend, falling to eleventh place with $3.7 million.

At the end of its original theatrical run, the film had grossed over $25.6 million worldwide.

=== Critical response ===
Jonah: A VeggieTales Movie received positive reviews from critics. Based on 53 reviews collected by review aggregator website Rotten Tomatoes, 64% of critics have given the film a positive review, with an average rating of 5.9/10. The site's critics consensus reads, "Jonah teaches wholesome messages to children in a funny, bouncy package." At Metacritic, the film has a weighted average score of 58 out of 100 based on 20 critics, indicating "mixed or average" reviews. Bruce Fretts of Entertainment Weekly argued that despite its cheesy humor, it was saved by its "bouncy animation and catchy songs".

Pete Croatto of the now-defunct Filmcritic.com praised the film as "a blast of educational energy", later citing it as an example of the surprises critics can find in viewing every film they can regardless of expected quality.

== Home media ==
Jonah: A VeggieTales Movie was released on VHS and a two-disc DVD by Artisan Home Entertainment on March 4, 2003. The release includes three different audio commentaries, one by the directors, one by the producer and animation director, and one featuring the directors acting as their respective characters Larry the Cucumber and Mr. Lunt. On the second disc, special features include six featurettes for the "Behind the Scenes" section, five featurettes for the "Music" section, five featurettes for the "Bonus Material" section, five featurettes for young audiences in the "Fun!" section, six trailers, and five Easter eggs. On March 8, 2011, Lionsgate Home Entertainment released the film on Blu-ray, with most of the DVD's special features retained.

The commentary featuring Larry and Mr. Lunt has received special praise from home media reviewers. Jeffrey Kauffman of Blu-ray.com stated that it "verges on the surreal and should be enjoyed by those who love Monty Python". David Blair of DVD Talk stated that it was "without a doubt the craziest, outright pointless, and most enjoyable commentary I've ever had the good fortune to hear", adding that he "found it substantially funnier than the movie itself".

The film was reissued on DVD and Blu-ray for its 20th anniversary by Universal Pictures Home Entertainment.
