= Kurt Heinecke =

American composer

Kurt Henry Heinecke (born January 10, 1963) is an American composer, musician, songwriter, photographer, and voice actor. He was the music director at Big Idea Entertainment, creators of the animated VeggieTales. He is the Assistant Artistic Director at Music City Strings.

== Biography ==
=== Early life ===
Heinecke was born in Wisconsin on January 10, 1963, and raised in Cullman, Alabama. He came from a musical family, his mother played the organ and was a member of the church choir. During his years at junior high he and his friends started a jazz band called Deathstar which later disbanded in high school. After graduation in 1982, Heinecke studied at the music lab at the University of Montevallo. He also went to study at Luther College where he got his B.A. in band and choral conducting.

=== Music career ===
After touring around the country and serving as a teacher in the Bahamas, Kurt finally settled down in Lincoln Park, Chicago, Illinois where he later became Director of Church Music at the Park Community Church. Serving as the choir director, he met Lisa who introduced him to her husband Phil Vischer and his friend Mike Nawrocki who would later co-found Big Idea Entertainment. Heinecke joined Phil and Mike and provided music for their video series VeggieTales. He also provided music for other Big Idea productions, such as 3-2-1 Penguins, Jonah and The Pirates Who Don't Do Anything. He has received six Dove Awards for his production work with Big Idea. He is also a producer, arranger, and performer at Oak Valley Studios and is the composer of the Adam Raccoon video series. Heinecke is currently composing the music for the CGI remake of Superbook. He is the Assistant Artistic Director at Music City Strings. As of 2019, he has rejoined Big Idea as the music composer and producer for the new VeggieTales television series to be broadcast on TBN.

=== Photography career ===
Heinecke took an interest in photography during junior high. He currently owns a photography studio in Franklin, Tennessee, his current residence. His photography includes concerts, events, weddings, and air shows.
