= Ron Smith (television) =

American director, voice actor and animator

- Born: July 8, 1966 (age 59)
- Occupations: Director, voice actor and animator

Ron Smith (born July 8, 1966) is an American director, voice actor and animator. He has been the voice of Kevin in 3-2-1 Penguins and worked as an assistant engineer on RoboCop: Alpha Commando and a character animator on G.I. Joe: Valor vs. Venom.

Currently working on the Angel Studios project, The Wingfeather Saga (based on the book series by Andrew Peterson).

== Personal life ==
He resides in Los Angeles, California with his wife Juile Smith.
