= Big Idea Entertainment =

American Christian animation production company

Big Idea Productions, LLC
- Logo used from 2002 to 2015
- Type: In-name-only unit of DreamWorks Animation
- Founded: February 1989; 37 years ago (GRAFx Studios); August 6, 1993; 33 years ago (Big Idea)
- Founders: Phil Vischer; Mike Nawrocki
- Fate: Currently exists as an in-name-only unit of DreamWorks Animation
- Key people: Phil Vischer; Mike Nawrocki
- Products: Animated direct-to-video programs Animated television series Animated theatrical films
- Parent: DreamWorks Classics (2003–present)

Big Idea Content Group (formerly known as Big Idea Productions, Inc., Big Idea, Inc. and Big Idea Entertainment, LLC; also known simply as Big Idea) is an American Christian animation studio and is currently an in-name only unit, best known for its animated VeggieTales series of Christian-themed home videos.

Founded in February 1989 as GRAFx Studios by Phil Vischer, the company was renamed as Big Idea Productions in August 1993 and it released its first direct-to-video VeggieTales program in December. In 2002, Big Idea adapted the Biblical story of Jonah for its first theatrical feature film, Jonah: A VeggieTales Movie, which was co-produced with FHE Pictures. Its second theatrical film, The Pirates Who Don't Do Anything: A VeggieTales Movie, was co-produced with Starz Animation for Universal Pictures and released in 2008.

From 1999 to 2004, headquarters of Big Idea Entertainment was in Lombard, Illinois, a suburb outside of Chicago. After Big Idea Entertainment declared bankruptcy in 2003 and the company was sold to Classic Media, headquarters was moved in 2004 to Franklin, Tennessee, a suburb outside of Nashville. In 2012, DreamWorks Animation purchased Classic Media. In 2013, DreamWorks began to oversee productions of Big Idea Entertainment and launched the Netflix series VeggieTales in the House. After production of VeggieTales in the House's sequel series entitled VeggieTales in the City wrapped in 2017, DreamWorks sold the Franklin headquarters to Kingdom Story Company. Big Idea continues to operate as an in-name-only subsidiary of DreamWorks Animation, with Universal Pictures recently giving TBN a license to make The VeggieTales Show.

Bob the Tomato and Larry the Cucumber, from VeggieTales, serve as the company's mascots.

== History ==
Big Idea was founded in February 1989 under the name GRAFx Studios by Phil Vischer to create graphics in television commercials. In 1991, Vischer created a 12-second short film called Mr. Cuke's Screen Test using the recently developed Softimage 3D. This short inspired him and Mike Nawrocki to create VeggieTales, with Nawrocki coming up with the name. Vischer thought the name "GRAFx" no longer suited a company about to create children's videos, so he renamed it as Big Idea Productions, Inc. on August 6, 1993. The company released its first video, Where's God When I'm S-Scared? in December of the same year.

Rapidly running out of office space, Big Idea relocated to the Chicago suburbs in 1997 with the purchase of the DuPage Theater in Lombard, Illinois. However, renovation delays, unforeseen building conditions, and lengthy zoning battles resulted. In the interim, the company was guided by Lombard Village officials to rent space at the Yorktown Center, a local mall.

In a co-production with FHE Pictures, Big Idea released its first theatrical feature film, Jonah: A VeggieTales Movie on October 4, 2002.

On September 2, 2003, Big Idea declared bankruptcy after encountering management and financial issues and a lawsuit by HIT Entertainment in 2001. By the end of the year, it was auctioned off to Classic Media for $19.3 million. After its purchase, the company relocated to Nashville in 2004.

On December 14, 2006, it was announced that Big Idea including its parent company at the time Classic Media would be acquired by UK-based rival Entertainment Rights for $210.0 million. Before the acquisition was completed, both companies announced distribution and production agreements with Genius Products LLC, replacing the Sony Wonder deal.

Big Idea partnered with Toronto-based Starz Animation to produce its second theatrical feature film, The Pirates Who Don't Do Anything: A VeggieTales Movie, which was released on January 11, 2008, by Universal Pictures.

In April 2009, Entertainment Rights fell into voluntary administration and sold its UK- and US-based subsidiaries, including Big Idea and its parent company, Classic Media, to Boomerang Media. As of 2011 Big Idea, Inc. has been repackaged officially as Big Idea Entertainment, LLC. In July 2012, Big Idea's parent company, Classic Media, was acquired by DreamWorks Animation and began trading as DreamWorks Classics.

On April 28, 2016, NBCUniversal announced that it would be acquiring DreamWorks Animation for $3.8 billion. The sale was completed on August 22, 2016.

On July 3, 2018, Vischer confirmed that Big Idea's offices in Franklin were shut down. While marketing employees continued to work for Big Idea during this time, DreamWorks sold the Franklin, Tennessee studio in late 2017.

In 2018, NBCUniversal licensed the properties of the studio to the Trinity Broadcasting Network. They launched the production of a new series entitled The VeggieTales Show in 2019 through a collaboration between NBCUniversal and Trilogy Animation Group. Vischer confirmed on Twitter that he and Nawrocki were both returning to work as head writers for the new series. On June 29, 2021, Vischer announced that he and Nawrocki were no longer working on VeggieTales due to pay disputes and creative differences.

== VeggieTales history ==
VeggieTales is a series of children's animated specials featuring anthropomorphic vegetables and conveying moral themes based on Christianity, spliced with joking references to pop culture and current events. VeggieTales was created by Phil Vischer and Mike Nawrocki, who also provide many of the voices. VeggieTales has also been released as books, games, and many other branded items such as toys and clothing. Additionally, the series has been adapted for television broadcast on Qubo (where it aired from September 9, 2006, to September 5, 2009) and on Netflix where DreamWorks Animation Television produced two series, VeggieTales in the House (which ran from November 26, 2014, to September 23, 2016) and VeggieTales in the City (which ran from February 24 to September 15, 2017).

== Filmography ==
=== Feature films ===
#	Title	Release date	Co-production with	Budget	Gross	Rotten Tomatoes	Metacritic
1	Jonah: A VeggieTales Movie	October 4, 2002	FHE Pictures	$14 million	$25.6 million	65%	58
2	The Pirates Who Don't Do Anything: A VeggieTales Movie	January 11, 2008	Universal Pictures; Starz Animation	$15 million	$13.2 million	43%	49

=== Direct-to-video/television series ===
==== VeggieTales and spin-offs ====
#	Title	Creator(s)/ Developer(s)	Premiere	Finale	Network	Note(s)
1	VeggieTales	Phil Vischer; Mike Nawrocki	December 23, 1993	March 3, 2015	Direct-to-video	
2	Larryboy: The Cartoon Adventures	Tom Bancroft	March 16, 2002	June 10, 2003	Direct-to-video	First spin-off of VeggieTales; Only 2D-animated series by Big Idea Entertainment
3	VeggieTales in the House	Doug TenNapel	November 26, 2014	September 23, 2016	Netflix	Second spin-off of VeggieTales
4	VeggieTales in the City	Doug TenNapel	February 24, 2017	September 15, 2017	Netflix	Third spin-off of VeggieTales; Sequel to VeggieTales in the House
5	The VeggieTales Show	Phil Vischer; Mike Nawrocki	October 15, 2019	April 1, 2022	TBN	Revival and sequel to the 1993 original series VeggieTales

==== Miscellaneous ====
#	Title	Creator(s)/ Developer(s) Animator(s)	Premiere	Finale	Network	Note(s)
1	Fabulicious Day	Bruce W. Stacey; Phil Vischer	April 2, 1996	August 13, 1996	Family Channel	Markus B. segments only.
2	3-2-1 Penguins!	Jeff Parker; Nathan Carlson; Phil Lollar; Mike Nawrocki; Phil Vischer; Ron Smith	November 14, 2000	November 13, 2008	Direct-to-video; Qubo	Season 1 originally released in direct-to-video Seasons 2–3 broadcast on Qubo

=== Television specials ===
#	Title	Release date	Network
1	VeggieTales Christmas Spectacular!	December 19, 1998	PAX
2	VeggieTales: The Star of Christmas	November 24, 2002	PBS
