= The Pirates Who Don't Do Anything: A VeggieTales Movie =

- Theatrical release poster
- Directed by: Mike Nawrocki
- Written by: Phil Vischer
- Based on: VeggieTales by Phil Vischer; Mike Nawrocki
- Produced by: Phil Vischer; Mike Nawrocki; David Pitts; Paula Marcus
- Starring: Phil Vischer; Mike Nawrocki; Laura Gerow; Yuri Lowenthal; Cam Clarke; Alan Lee; Tim Hodge
- Edited by: John Wahba
- Music by: Kurt Heinecke
- Production companies: Universal Pictures; Big Idea Productions; Starz Animation; Entertainment Rights; Veggie Pirates Productions
- Distributed by: Universal Pictures
- Release date: January 11, 2008
- Running time: 82 minutes
- Countries: United States; Canada
- Language: English
- Budget: $15 million
- Box office: $13.2 million

The Pirates Who Don't Do Anything: A VeggieTales Movie is a 2008 animated adventure comedy film directed by Mike Nawrocki and written by Phil Vischer. Produced by Big Idea Productions, Veggie Pirates Productions, and animated by Starz Animation, it is the second of the two theatrical films to feature characters from the VeggieTales video series, following Jonah: A VeggieTales Movie (2002). The film stars the voices of Vischer, Nawrocki, Laura Gerow, Yuri Lowenthal, Cam Clarke, Alan Lee, and Tim Hodge.

The film follows three misfit busboys—Elliot, Sedgewick, and George—who all dream of stardom despite being slackers. One day, they are sent to the 17th century via a magical "Helpseeker" to rescue a royal family from an evil pirate named Robert the Terrible.

The Pirates Who Don't Do Anything: A VeggieTales Movie was released in the United States on January 11, 2008 by Universal Pictures. The film received mixed reviews from critics, and was a box-office bomb, grossing $13 million on a $15 million budget.

== Plot ==
In the 17th century, an evil pirate named Robert the Terrible attacks and boards one of the Kingdom of Monterria's ships, capturing his teenage nephew Prince Alexander. Eluding the pirates, Alexander's younger sister Princess Eloise and her worrisome servant Willory (played by Archibald Asparagus) send a device that the king made, called a "Helpseeker," to find heroes to save Alexander.

In modern times, three misfits: the passive George (played by Pa Grape), the doubtful Sedgewick (played by Mr. Lunt), and the timid Elliot (played by Larry the Cucumber) are employees at a pirate-themed dinner theater. Although they want to be seen as heroes by their loved ones, as lowly cabin boys they believe their dream is unattainable. After accidentally damaging the set while auditioning for the show one night, they are fired and thrown into an alley. The Helpseeker locates them and, after Elliot activates the device, transports the trio back in time to Monterria.

Meeting the Princess and Willory, the group sets off to Jolly Joe's Tavern where they learn that Robert, the younger brother of the king before being banished, has kidnapped Alexander in the hopes of exacting revenge on the king. Setting sail in search of the whereabouts of Robert's hideout, Robert's henchmen capture Eloise and Willory. As George and Elliot continue on their quest, a cowardly Sedgewick decides to stay behind in a cave filled with "cheese curls". After the two leave, Sedgewick discovers the curls are instead living worm-like creatures which chase him out of the cave, forcing him to overcome his fear and self-doubt.

Sedgewick meets up with George and Elliot, having swum the ocean being chased by the living worm-like creatures after the two arrived on an island populated by a family of rock giants, who help them make it to Robert's fortress. Arriving at a hidden bay outside of the fortress, the trio are attacked by a giant serpent. However, Elliot realizes the guardian is actually a mechanical device and saves his friends by shutting the serpent down with a lever in its throat. Once inside, George, Sedgewick, and Elliot rescue Eloise and Alexander but are confronted by Robert, who demands to know when the king is returning. With no other choice, George, Sedgewick, and Elliot confess that they are "only cabin boys," and not heroes. But, suddenly, finding his self-respect, George uses a chandelier to knock the pirate down and the group escapes through the fortress's cistern with Robert and his men in hot pursuit. Back in the bay, Robert's ship opens fire on the group's small boat. The king arrives, sinks Robert's ship, and rescues the group.

After receiving medals from the king and being declared heroes, the Helpseeker returns Elliot, George, and Sedgewick to the restaurant. Unbeknownst to them, Robert has stowed away on their trip back to get revenge on them for defeating him and attacks the dinner theater set and mistakes Sir Frederick (played by Jimmy Gourd), one of the stage performers, for George. In a final showdown, the trio defeat Robert and send him back to the 17th century. The audience cheer wildly as the gang earn the respect they had desired. Offered a second chance to be in the show, the three turn down the second chance and leave to pursue adventure elsewhere one more time as the Helpseeker blinks once again. The film ends with the entire cast singing "Rock Monster", a parody of The B-52's' hit "Rock Lobster". Once they are done singing, Bob the Tomato finally makes his appearance, as the director. Later, Robert is arrested by the King for his crimes as he is shown dancing to the music during the credits along with his imprisoned henchmen.

== Cast ==
- Phil Vischer as George (Pa Grape), Sedgewick (Mr. Lunt), Willory (Archibald Asparagus), Mr. Hibbing (Mr. Nezzer), Sir Frederick Lewis (Jimmy Gourd), Pirate Spy (Scallion #1), Pirate (Phillipe Pea) and Bob the Tomato
- Mike Nawrocki as Elliot (Larry the Cucumber), Pirate (Jean-Claude Pea), Theater Foe (Jerry Gourd), Pirate Spy Sidekick, Pirate with Dummy and Rock Monster Father
- Laura Gerow as Princess Eloise
- Yuri Lowenthal as Prince Alexander
- Cam Clarke as Robert the Terrible and The King
- Tim Hodge as Jolly Joe (Charlie Pincher) and the Ship Officer
- Megan Murphy as Madame Blueberry
- Alan Lee as a Blind Man and One-Eyed Louie
- Cydney Trent as Bernadette (Petunia Rhubarb)
- Keri Pisapia as Ellen
- John Wahba as The Dungeon Guard
- Sondra Morton Chaffin as Caroline
- Drake Lyle as George Jr.
- Ally Nawrocki as Lucy and Rock Monster Girl
- Jim Poole as Scooter
- Patrick Kramer as Colin
- Joe Spadaford as Jacob Lewis and Stubb Pirate Coward

== Production ==
The VeggieTales characters (left to right) Mr. Lunt, Pa Grape, and Larry the Cucumber on the main stage at the Georgia International Horse Park in Conyers during the Celebrate Freedom 2007 concert on September 1, 2007, dressed in costume for the promotion of the film

During production on their first movie Jonah: A VeggieTales Movie, Big Idea had already started exploring ideas for additional films, such as a prequel about the in-universe origins of VeggieTales and a spinoff of The Pirates Who Don't Do Anything, a group of characters introduced in Very Silly Songs!. The prequel, titled The Bob and Larry Movie, was scheduled to be Big Idea's second feature film, with a planned release in 2005; however, the movie was scrapped in mid-2003 due to Big Idea's bankruptcy and acquisition by Classic Media.

In 2004, Phil Vischer revealed on his website that Classic Media was interested in another feature film and that both the Pirates spin-off and The Bob and Larry Movie were being considered for relaunch. Ultimately, The Pirates Who Don't Do Anything was chosen and entered production in late 2005.

Vischer completed the script for this film in 2002, noting that he wrote it before Pirates of the Caribbean: The Curse of the Black Pearl (2003) was released. The concept, script, and voices were done by Big Idea Entertainment, and animation production was done by Starz Animation.

This is the final film in the franchise to feature any involvement from both Vischer and Nawrocki, as the two would eventually depart from Big Idea over creative differences years after the film's completion.

== Music ==
The Pirates Who Don't Do Anything: A VeggieTales Movie (Original Movie Soundtrack)

Soundtrack album by Various artists
- Released: December 4, 2007
- Studios: Barrandov Studios, Prague
- Genres: Pop; rock; film score
- Length: 47:07
- Label: Decca
- Producers: Kurt Heinecke; Steve Taylor; Mark Lee Townsend; TobyMac; Christopher Stevens; Mike Nawrocki; David Mullen

The Pirates Who Don't Do Anything: A VeggieTales Movie (Original Movie Soundtrack) is the soundtrack album for the film. It was released on December 4, 2007, by Decca Records. The score, composed by veteran VeggieTales composer by Kurt Heinecke, was recorded at Barrandov Studios in Prague.

=== Track listing ===
No.	Title	Writer(s)	Performer(s)	Length
1.	"Opening Title/Spanish Gold"	Kurt Heinecke; Phil Vischer	Cast	1:42
2.	"Jolly Joe's"	Kurt Heinecke; Mike Nawrocki	Jim Poole; Phil Vischer; Mike Nawrocki	1:36
3.	"Yo Ho Hero"	Steve Taylor	Newsboys; Steve Taylor	2:31
4.	"Rock Monster"	Charlie Wilson; Fred Schneider; Kate Pierson; Keith Julian Strickland; Ricky Wilson; Mike Nawrocki	Cast	2:02
5.	"The Pirates Who Don't Do Anything"	Kurt Heinecke; Mike Nawrocki	Relient K	2:31
6.	"What We Gonna Do?"	Christopher Stevens; Randy Crawford; Richard Peña; Toby McKeehan	TobyMac	3:06
7.	"The Right Thing"	Matthew West	Mandisa	3:23
8.	"The Pirates Who Don't Do Anything (Silly Song)"	Kurt Heinecke; Mike Nawrocki	Cast	3:15
9.	"The Sea Medley with Papa's Got A Gumball Nellie"	Mike Nawrocki; Phil Vischer	Cast	3:56
10.	"One-Eyed Louie"	Kurt Heinecke		1:54
11.	"The Cave Medley"	Kurt Heinecke		3:32
12.	"Walking Rocks"	Kurt Heinecke		3:12
13.	"Donkey-Shaped Help/Final Battle"	Kurt Heinecke		4:37
14.	"I Give You Three Heroes"	Kurt Heinecke		2:27
15.	"Spanish Gold Reprise/Celebration"	Kurt Heinecke; Phil Vischer	Cast	3:11
16.	"Second Chances"	David Mullen; Phil Vischer	Anointed	4:02
Total length:				47:07

== Release ==
The Pirates Who Don't Do Anything: A VeggieTales was released in the United States on January 11, 2008, by Universal Pictures. It received a rating of G by the Motion Picture Association of America.

=== Home media ===
The film was released on DVD on October 14, 2008, by Universal Studios Home Entertainment. The DVD release's special features include family activities, behind-the-scenes footage, and DVD-exclusive games. It also features an extended ending of the film.

== Reception ==
=== Critical response ===
The Pirates Who Don't Do Anything: A VeggieTales Movie received mixed reviews. The review aggregation website Rotten Tomatoes reported that out of 35 critic reviews, 43% of them were positive, with an average rating of 4.9/10. The site's consensus states: "This Veggietale should please the youngest crowds, but the silly script will tire the more discerning viewer." Metacritic assigned the film a weighted average score of 49 out of 100, based on 13 critics, indicating "mixed or average" reviews.

=== Box office ===
The Pirates Who Don't Do Anything: A VeggieTales Movie grossed $13 million in North America, and $266,456 in other territories, for a worldwide total of $13.2 million. Produced on a budget of $15 million, the film was a box-office failure.

The film opened on January 11, 2008. It grossed $1.1 million on its first day in 1,337 theaters, with an average of $835 per theater, and made $4.3 million in its opening weekend, ranking in ninth place behind P.S. I Love You; its opening was lower compared to Jonah: A VeggieTales Movie, which made $6.2 million in its opening weekend. It ended its theatrical run in North America on March 6, 2008, with a total of $13 million.
