= Children's programming on Telemundo =

Telemundo logo

Children's programming has played a part in Telemundo's programming since its initial roots in television. This article outlines the history of children's television programming on Telemundo including the various blocks and notable programs that have aired throughout the television network's history.

== History ==
For much of its history, the bulk of NetSpan/Telemundo's children's programming has been derived of mainly live-action and animated programming from American and international producers, including Spanish-language dubs of programs produced in other languages, and Spanish-language programming acquired from other countries.

=== Telemuñequitos (1992–1998) ===
On June 1, 1992, the network's first foray into children's programming, Telemuñequitos, was in partnership with Turner Broadcasting System, and featured Spanish-language dubs of theatrical animated shorts (including Looney Tunes, Merrie Melodies and Popeye the Sailor), and Hanna-Barbera series until 1994. The network converted its children's programming every weekday mornings until 2000.

=== Telemundo Infantil (1995–1998) ===
In September 1995, Telemundo launched a branding for its children's programs, Telemundo Infantil ("Telemundo Kids"), which was developed via input from viewers on what they wanted to be featured in a children's show. The block initially contained existing series Telemuñequitos, Kolitas, Nubeluz and Captain Scarlet and the Mysterons.

=== Nickelodeon en Telemundo (1998–2001) ===
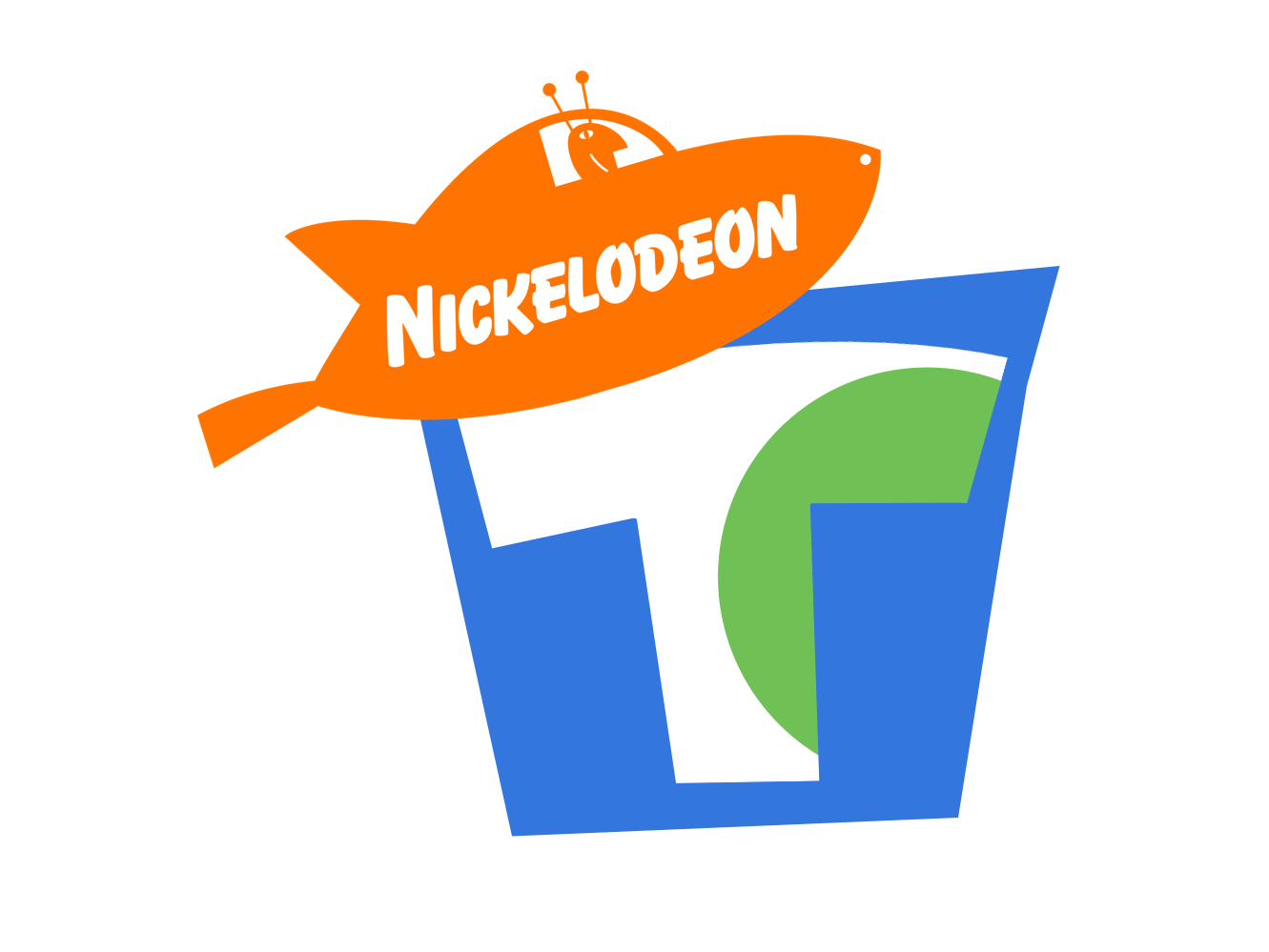
Nickelodeon en Telemundo logo

On November 9, 1998, Telemundo introduced Nickelodeon en Telemundo, featuring Spanish dubs of Nickelodeon programming such as Rugrats, Doug, Aaahh!!! Real Monsters, Hey Arnold!, Rocko's Modern Life, Blue's Clues and Dora the Explorer. The block ran on weekday mornings until September 5, 2000, when it was relegated to weekend mornings in order to accommodate a time slot for Hoy En El Mundo (with Jose Diaz-Balart).

=== Telemundo Kids (2001–2006) ===
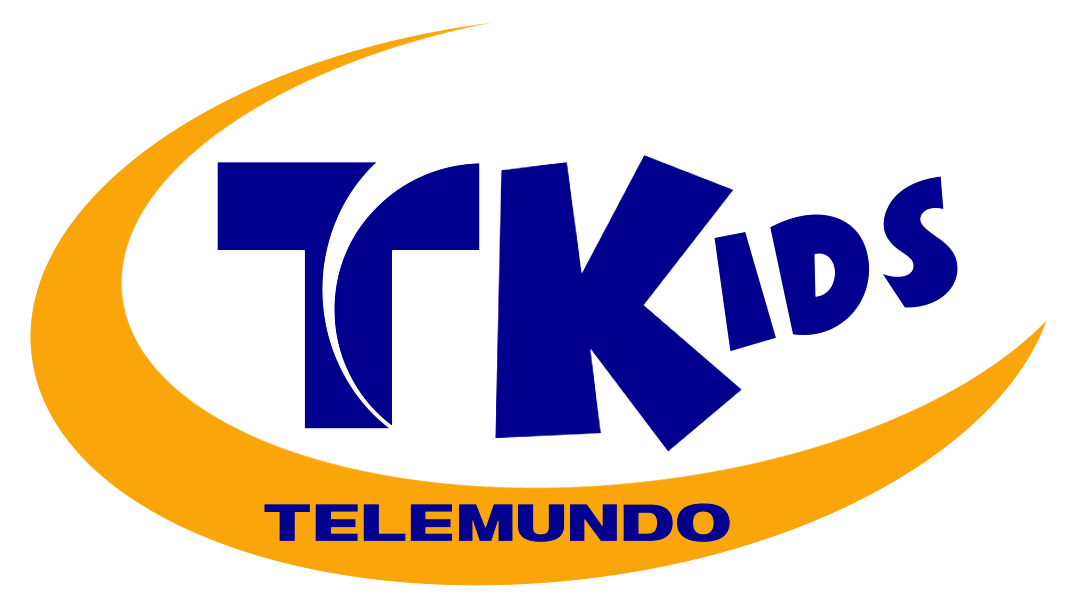
Telemundo Kids logo

Nickelodeon en Telemundo was discontinued after September 30, 2001, ahead of the expiry of Telemundo's program supply deal with the network. It was replaced by Telemundo Kids on October 6, 2001, featuring a mix of acquired programming from both Sony Pictures Television (such as Men in Black: The Series, Dragon Tales, Jackie Chan Adventures and Max Steel) and various other providers. Nickelodeon programming (including Rugrats, Hey Arnold!, Dora the Explorer, and new addition All Grown Up!) returned Telemundo on October 2, 2004, with various Canadian shows (including Wimzie's House from CBC, and both Monster by Mistake and Jacob Two-Two from YTV) also joining.

Following Telemundo's sale to NBC in 2001 and the split of CBS and Viacom, Telemundo Kids was discontinued on September 3, 2006. Jacob Two-Two transitioned the following week to the block's successor Qubo, while Dora the Explorer (joined by its spin-off Go, Diego, Go!) migrated to rival network Univision upon the launch of the Planeta U block on April 5, 2008.

=== Qubo on NBC/Telemundo (2006–2012) ===
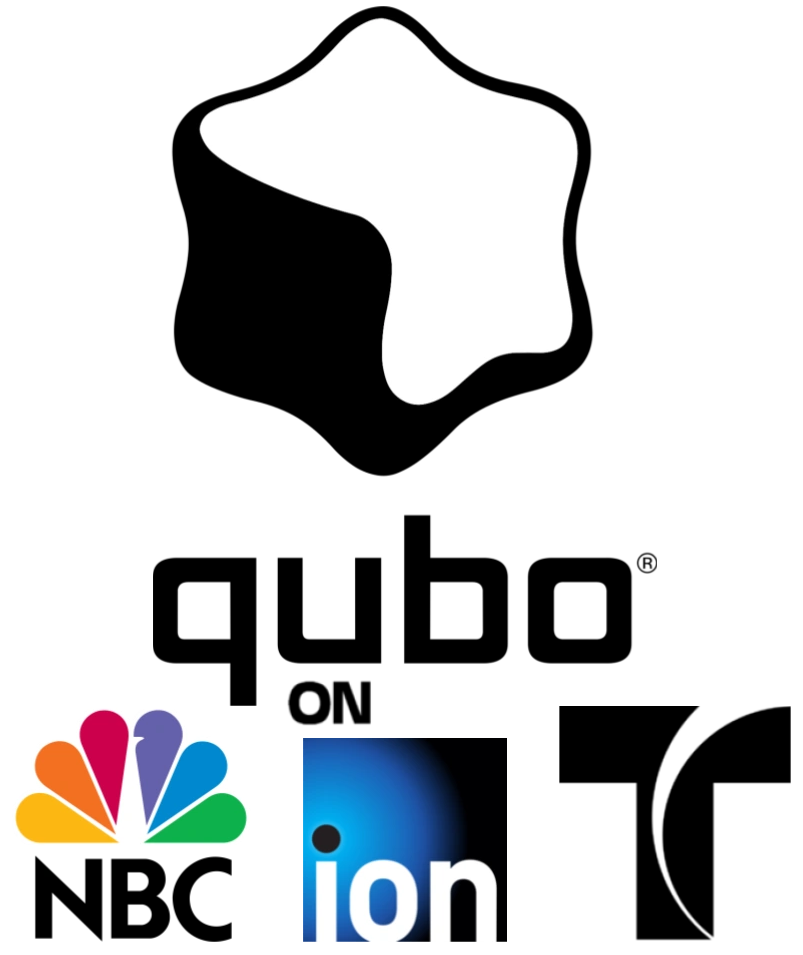
Qubo on NBC, Ion Television, and Telemundo

On September 9, 2006, Telemundo debuted Qubo, a new weekend morning block of educational programming formed as a joint venture between NBCUniversal, Ion Media Networks, Corus Entertainment, Scholastic, and Classic Media subsidiary Big Idea Entertainment. The block carried Spanish-language dubs of programming acquired or produced for Qubo's English-language blocks on both NBC and Ion Television. While the other two networks aired the full three-hour block within a single timeslot, Telemundo divided the programming across two 90-minute blocks airing on both Saturdays and Sundays.

The reasoning why the name "qubo" was chosen for the endeavor, or why its logo is a cube, has not been publicly explained by any of the partners, although general manager Rick Rodriguez stated in an interview with Multichannel News that the name was intended to be something that sounded fun, and be a brand that could easily be uniformally used in English and Spanish.

A companion 24-hour digital multicast network, Qubo Channel, launched on the DT2 subchannel of Ion Media Networks’ terrestrial stations on January 8, 2007. While primarily broadcast in English like the companion Qubo blocks on both NBC and Ion, the standalone Qubo network included a Spanish audio track available for most programming via the second audio program (SAP) feed, utilizing the same Spanish dubs used for the block on Telemundo. Certain programs compatible with SAP also provided Spanish subtitles via the CC3 closed captioning channel, functioning in the opposite manner of Telemundo's strategy in using CC3 to present English subtitles during its weekday prime time lineup.

=== MiTelemundo (NBC Kids) (2012–2017) ===
MiTelemundo logo from 2012 to 2017.

After NBCUniversal dropped out of the Qubo joint venture following its acquisition by Comcast, on March 28, 2012, it was announced that Telemundo would replace its Qubo block with MiTelemundo; programmed by Sprout, it consisted of Spanish dubbed versions of programs seen on its sister broadcast network's Saturday morning block, NBC Kids.

MiTelemundo debuted alongside NBC Kids on July 7, 2012, one week after the Qubo block ended its run on NBC on June 30, followed by Telemundo on July 1. This left Ion Television (and later Ion Plus) as the only network to retain a Qubo-branded children's block, until Qubo Channel ceased operations on February 28, 2021, as the E.W. Scripps Company is now the owner of Ion Media, which they acquired on January 7, 2021.

=== MiTelemundo (Litton Entertainment) (2018–present) ===
MiTelemundo logo from 2019-present.

With NBC Kids being replaced with Litton Entertainment's The More You Know block on NBC by September 25, 2016, MiTelemundo initially retained its existing programming until January 6, 2018, when MiTelemundo moved exclusively to Saturday mornings and became programmed by Litton. The relaunched MiTelemundo carries Spanish dubs of programming from The More You Know.

Named after NBC's series of public service campaigns, the three-hour Saturday morning block is programmed by Litton Entertainment, and features live-action programming aimed at teens, all of which is dubbed in Spanish. Despite the change of programming, it did not change the name of the block, which remains as MiTelemundo.

== Programming ==
=== Schedule issues ===
Due to regulations defined by the Children's Television Act that require stations to carry E/I compliant programming for three hours each week at any time between 7:00 a.m. and 10:00 a.m. local time, some Telemundo stations may defer certain programs aired within its Saturday morning block to Sunday daytime or earlier Saturday morning slots, or (in the case of affiliates in the Western United States) Saturday afternoons as makegoods to comply with the CTA regulations.

=== List of notable programs ===
==== Telemuñequitos ====
Title	Premiere date	End date	Source(s)
Looney Tunes	June 1, 1992	May 17, 1998	
Popeye the Sailor	June 1, 1992	May 17, 1998	
Merrie Melodies	June 1, 1992	May 17, 1998	
The Biskitts	June 8, 1992	January 10, 1994	
Goober and the Ghost Chasers	June 9, 1992	January 13, 1994	
Inch High, Private Eye	June 10, 1992	January 12, 1994	
Buford and the Galloping Ghost	June 12, 1992	January 14, 1994	

==== Telemundo Infantil ====
Title	Premiere date	End date	Source(s)
Mazinger Z	August 22, 1987	March 12, 1989	
Galactic Gale Baxingar	August 22, 1987	March 18, 1989	
Future Boy Conan	October 26, 1987	November 27, 1987	
Kolitas	October 4, 1990	May 9, 1999	
Nubeluz	June 6, 1992	September 14, 1996	
Captain Scarlet and the Mysterons	September 27, 1992	August 24, 1997	
Los Supercampeones	January 17, 1994	December 2, 1994	
Arcandina	August 25, 1997	January 17, 1998	
Lift Off	January 12, 1998	September 29, 2001	
Garfield and Friends	January 12, 1998	May 28, 2000	
Jumanji	November 9, 1998	September 22, 2000	

==== Nickelodeon en Telemundo ====
Title	Premiere date	End date	Source(s)
Rugrats	November 9, 1998; January 9, 2005 ("Telemundo Kids")	September 30, 2001; September 3, 2006 ("Telemundo Kids")	
Doug	November 1, 1999	September 22, 2000	
Rocko's Modern Life	November 9, 1998	September 22, 2000	
Aaahh!!! Real Monsters	November 9, 1998	September 22, 2000	
Blue's Clues	November 9, 1998	September 30, 2001	
Hey Arnold!	November 10, 1998; October 3, 2004 ("Telemundo Kids")	September 30, 2001; January 2, 2005 ("Telemundo Kids")	
Dora the Explorer	August 21, 2000; October 2, 2004 ("Telemundo Kids")	September 30, 2001; September 3, 2006 ("Telemundo Kids")	

==== Telemundo Kids ====
Title	Premiere date	End date	Source(s)
Dragon Ball Z	July 5, 1999	August 24, 2003	
Ni Ni's Treehouse	October 6, 2001	April 26, 2003	
Agua Viva	October 6, 2001	April 26, 2003	
Las Tres Mellizas	October 6, 2001	December 28, 2003	
Bizbirije	October 6, 2001	April 26, 2003	
Nico	October 6, 2001	May 15, 2004	
Toonimals!	October 6, 2001	April 27, 2003	
Men in Black: The Series	October 7, 2001	April 27, 2003	
Juana la Iguana	October 7, 2001	April 3, 2004	
Dragon Tales	October 7, 2001	September 26, 2004	
Jackie Chan Adventures	October 7, 2001	September 26, 2004	
Max Steel	October 7, 2001	October 27, 2002	
Wimzie's House	October 2, 2004	September 3, 2006	
Monster by Mistake	October 2, 2004	September 10, 2005	
All Grown Up!	October 3, 2004	January 2, 2005	
Jacob Two-Two	January 9, 2005	September 2, 2006	

==== Qubo en Telemundo ====
Title	Premiere date	End date	Source(s)
Dragon	September 9, 2006	June 29, 2008	
3-2-1 Penguins!	September 9, 2006	September 13, 2009	
Larryboy: The Cartoon Adventures	September 9, 2006	September 29, 2007	
VeggieTales	September 9, 2006	September 13, 2009	
Babar	September 10, 2006	June 30, 2012	
Jane and the Dragon	September 10, 2006	June 30, 2012	
Jacob Two-Two	September 10, 2006	October 2009	
My Friend Rabbit	October 2007	2009	
Postman Pat	October 2007	June 2008	
Turbo Dogs	October 4, 2008	December 2011	
The Zula Patrol	2008	2009, 2012	
Willa's Wild Life	September 20, 2009	July 1, 2012	
Shelldon	October 17, 2009	July 1, 2012	
The Magic School Bus	October 9, 2010	December 2011	
Pearlie	October 10, 2010	July 1, 2012	

==== MiTelemundo (NBC Kids) ====
Title	Premiere date	End date	Source(s)
LazyTown	July 7, 2012	September 24, 2016	
Jay Jay the Jet Plane	July 7, 2012	December 8, 2013	
Raggs	July 7, 2012	September 24, 2016	
Noodle and Doodle	July 8, 2012	December 31, 2017	
The Chica Show	2013	December 31, 2017	
Nina's World	2015	December 31, 2017	
Maya the Bee	2017	December 31, 2017	

==== MiTelemundo (Litton Entertainment) ====
Title	Premiere date	Source(s)
El viajero con Josh Garcia (The Voyager with Josh Garcia)	2018–present	
Salvando animales (Wilderness Vet with Dr. Oakley)	2018–present	
Aventuras con Dylan Dreyer (Journey with Dylan Dreyer)	2018–present	
Vivir al natural, Danny Seo (Naturally, Danny Seo)	2018–present	
Una mano amiga (Give)	2018–present	
El campeon en ti (The Champion Within with Lauren Thompson)	2018–present	
Taller del Consumidor (Consumer 101)	2019–present	
Exploración Planeta Tierra (Earth Odyssey with Dylan Dreyer)	2020–present	
Historia Familiar (A New Leaf)	2020–present	
Descubriendo Mis Raíces (Roots Less Traveled)	2020–present	
Pequeños En La Naturaleza (Wild Child)	2021–present	
Un Equipo: El Poder Del Deporte (One Team: The Power of Sports)	2022–present	

== See also ==
- Children's Programming on NBC
