= Children's programming on NBC =

Historical summary of children's programming aired by NBC

NBC Peacock logo

Children's programming has played a part in NBC's programming since its initial roots in television. This article outlines the history of children's television programming on NBC including the various blocks and notable programs that have aired throughout the television network's history on weekends.

== History ==
=== 1947–1956 ===
In 1947, NBC's first major children's program was Howdy Doody, one of the era's first breakthrough television programs. The series, which ran for 13 years until it ended in 1960, featured a myriad of characters led by a freckle-faced marionette voiced by the show's host, "Buffalo" Bob Smith. Howdy Doody spent the first nine years of its run airing on weekday afternoons.

=== 1956–1992 ===
In 1956, NBC stopped airing children's programming within its weekday afternoon schedule, relegating the network's children's shows to Saturdays only with Howdy Doody serving as its marquee franchise for the remaining four years of that series' run. From the mid-1960s until 1992, the bulk of the children's programs broadcast by NBC were derived from theatrical shorts like The Pink Panther Show and classic Woody Woodpecker and Looney Tunes shorts; reruns of popular television series such as The Flintstones and The Jetsons; and foreign acquisitions such as Astro Boy and Kimba the White Lion.

During this period, the network also aired original animated series – most notably, the 1980s series The Smurfs and Alvin and the Chipmunks. It also carried animated series adapted from certain live-action NBC series such as It's Punky Brewster (based on the sitcom Punky Brewster), Emergency +4 (based on the medical drama Emergency!) ALF: The Animated Series (based on the sitcom ALF) and Star Trek: The Animated Series (based on the science fiction drama Star Trek), as well as animated series vehicles for certain NBC prime time stars including Gary Coleman (The Gary Coleman Show) and Mr. T (Mister T), and original live-action series including the Sid & Marty Krofft-produced The Banana Splits, The Bugaloos and H.R. Pufnstuf.

The Metric Marvels, a short-form series produced by the creators of rival ABC's Schoolhouse Rock! as part of a failed attempt to encourage metrication in the United States, aired on NBC during the late 1970s.

In September 1985, NBC was the first network to broadcast Saturday morning cartoons in stereo.

One series that made up to the NBC Saturday morning lineup was Fraggle Rock: The Animated Series. NBC aired the program on Saturday mornings at 10:00 AM (later moved to 11:00 AM) for one season during 1987.

==== Final years with animated programming (1989–1992) ====
In September 1989, NBC premiered Saved by the Bell, a sitcom centered on the fictional Bayside High School in Pacific Palisades, California, which originated on The Disney Channel the year prior as Good Morning, Miss Bliss (the predecessor series, set in an Indianapolis, Indiana middle school, served as a starring vehicle for Hayley Mills, who did not return for the retooled series; four cast members from that show – Mark-Paul Gosselaar, Dennis Haskins, Lark Voorhies and Dustin Diamond – were cast in Saved by the Bell as their Miss Bliss characters). Despite receiving harsh reviews from television critics, Saved by the Bell would become one of the most popular teen-oriented series in television history as well as the highest-rated series on Saturday mornings, dethroning ABC's The Bugs Bunny and Tweety Show in its first season. In addition, other teen-oriented programs, including Guys Next Door and Kid 'n Play (series based on the hip-hop duo), joined the lineup in Fall 1990 to bring in more attention to the older targeted audiences for Saturday mornings rather than just children, which this attempt was unsuccessful as Guys Next Door quickly ended the next year.

However, in October 1990, then-President George H. W. Bush signed a deal with the Federal Communications Commission to require educational content under the Children's Television Act for the Fall 1991 season, which mandated these guidelines in animated programs for the network, including Space Cats, Super Mario World, and ProStars. Following the negative reception with this experience, NBC subsequently canceled the animated programming for Saturday mornings as FCC responded that not all cartoons were made to be educational.

=== TNBC (1992–2002) ===
TNBC logo

As results of the continued success of Saved by the Bell and the failed experience of enforcing educational content, NBC restructured its Saturday morning lineup in September 1992 by replacing children's programming with live-action – mostly scripted – series aimed at teenagers as part of a new three-hour block under the brand TNBC (the network also launched an hour-long Saturday edition of Today that debuted simultaneously with the TNBC lineup).

Most of the programs on the TNBC lineup were sitcoms produced by Saved by the Bell executive producer Peter Engel such as City Guys, Hang Time, California Dreams, One World and the Saved by the Bell spinoff, Saved by the Bell: The New Class. Many of the scripted series incorporating social issues such as underage drinking, drug use and sexual harassment. By 2001, the block had begun suffering from declining viewership; in addition, although the block was aimed at adolescents, TNBC's programs ironically registered a median viewer age of 41.

NBA Inside Stuff, an analysis and interview program aimed at teens that was hosted for most of its run by Ahmad Rashad (who also served as a commentator and pre-game host for the network's NBA coverage during much of Inside Stuff's NBC run), also aired alongside the TNBC lineup during the NBA season until 2002, with the program moving to ABC the following season as a result of that network taking the NBA rights from NBC.

=== Discovery Kids on NBC (2002–2006) ===
On January 6, 2002, NBC entered into an agreement with Discovery Communications, in which it would produce a new Saturday morning block for the network featuring original programs from the Discovery Kids cable channel under a time-lease agreement to provide programming compliant with the FCC's educational programming guidelines to NBC's affiliates, rather than having any network input or production. The block, branded "Discovery Kids on NBC", premiered on October 5, 2002. Originally, the lineup consisted of only live-action series featuring a mix of new series and existing Discovery Kids programs including Trading Spaces: Boys vs. Girls (a spin-off of the TLC home renovation reality show Trading Spaces) and the reality game show Endurance (a Survivor-style series created and executive produced by host J. D. Roth, who later produced The Biggest Loser for NBC in 2003).

In November 2003, the block expanded to include animated series under the banner "Real Toons", marking the first time that any animated programming had aired on NBC since 1992. In March 2006, Discovery Communications announced it would not renew its contract with NBC, citing a desire to focus exclusively on the Discovery Kids cable channel. Discovery Kids on NBC ended its run on September 2, 2006.

=== Qubo on NBC/Telemundo (2006–2012) ===
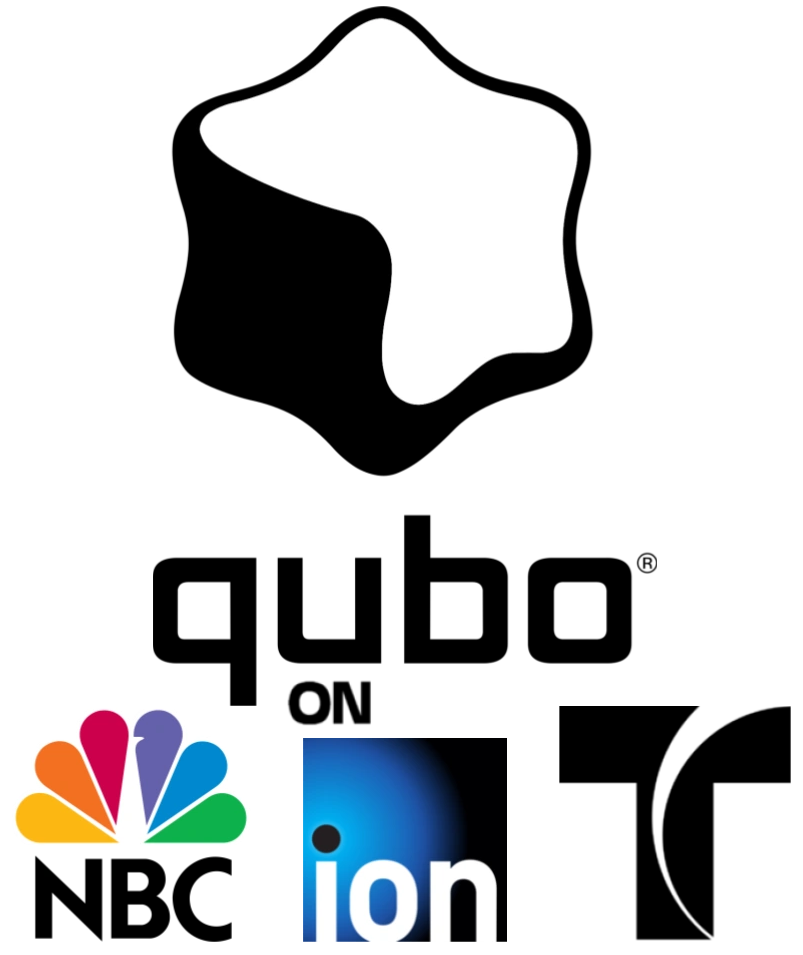
Qubo on NBC, Ion Television, and Telemundo

In May 2006, NBCUniversal and Ion Media Networks announced plans to form Qubo, a joint venture in conjunction with Scholastic Corporation, Classic Media and Canada-based Corus Entertainment's animation subsidiary Nelvana. The multi-platform programming endeavor, aimed at children between 4 and 8 years of age, would comprise children's program blocks airing on NBC, Spanish-language sister network Telemundo and Ion Media's i: Independent Television (now Ion Television), as well as a 24-hour digital multicast channel on i's owned-and-operated stations (alternatively known as Qubo Channel), video on demand services and a branded website. The reasoning why the name "qubo" was chosen for the endeavor, or why its logo is a cube, has never been publicly stated by any of the partners, although general manager Rick Rodriguez stated in an interview with Multichannel News that the name was intended to be something that sounded fun, and be a brand that could easily be used uniformly in English and Spanish.

The new Qubo on NBC block premiered on September 9, 2006, featuring seven programs in its initial season: VeggieTales, 3-2-1 Penguins!, Larryboy: The Cartoon Adventures, Dragon, Babar, Jane and the Dragon, and Jacob Two-Two, the last of which was carried over from Telemundo's previous children's block, Telemundo Kids. Initially, VeggieTales episodes aired on the block excised religious content originally incorporated before and after the main feature in the home media releases. This drew criticism for the block and NBC in particular from the conservative watchdog group Parents Television Council, as well as VeggieTales co-creator Phil Vischer, who claimed that he was unaware of the intent to edit out the religious material when Qubo acquired the programming distribution rights. Additionally, 3-2-1 Penguins! (the original direct-to-video series) and Larryboy: The Cartoon Adventures were initially presented together under the title 3-2-1 Penguins! and Larryboy Stories, with episodes alternating between the two shows until September 29, 2007, when Larryboy was dropped from the lineup and the original direct-to-video episodes of 3-2-1 Penguins! were replaced by a brand new, televised second season of the series the following week.

=== NBC Kids (2012–2016) ===
NBC Kids logo

On March 28, 2012, NBC announced that the three-hour children's programming time period allocated by the network on Weekend mornings would be taken over by Sprout (which had become a sibling television property to NBC following parent company NBCUniversal's 2010 majority purchase by Comcast; NBC later took full ownership of the network, whose owners previously included Sesame Workshop and HIT Entertainment) and launch a new weekend morning block called NBC Kids, which is aimed at preschoolers and grade school-aged children ages 2 to 9. A similarly programmed block would also launch on Telemundo under the name MiTelemundo. This block meets the programming requirements defined by the FCC's Children's Television Act, and is the first to air in high definition.

NBC Kids debuted on July 7, 2012, one week after the Qubo block ended its run on NBC on June 30, followed by Telemundo on July 1. This left Ion Television (and later Ion Plus) as the only network to retain a Qubo-branded children's block, until Qubo Channel ceased operations on February 28, 2021, as the E.W. Scripps Company is now the owner of Ion Media, which they acquired on January 7, 2021.

Between 2014 and 2015, several PBS Kids programs were being removed from both the block and the Sprout channel due to PBS leaving the channel and continuing with its own children's programming separately and after being acquired by NBCUniversal in 2010. Then on both February 24, 2016 and March 1, 2016, NBC announced that NBC Kids would shut down and succeeded on October 8, 2016, by The More You Know, a block produced by Litton Entertainment that would feature live-action documentary and lifestyle programs aimed at preteens and teenagers, similarly to a block also introduced by Litton for NBC's co-owner CW for the past two years. The transfer came as part of a shift by broadcast television networks towards using their weekend morning lineup only to comply with the educational programming requirements and when Sprout changed its name to Universal Kids on September 9, 2017 (closed down eight years later due to Peacock's move). NBC Kids quietly went to the Noodle and Doodle end credits shortly before NBC Sports on September 25, 2016.

=== The More You Know (2016–present) ===
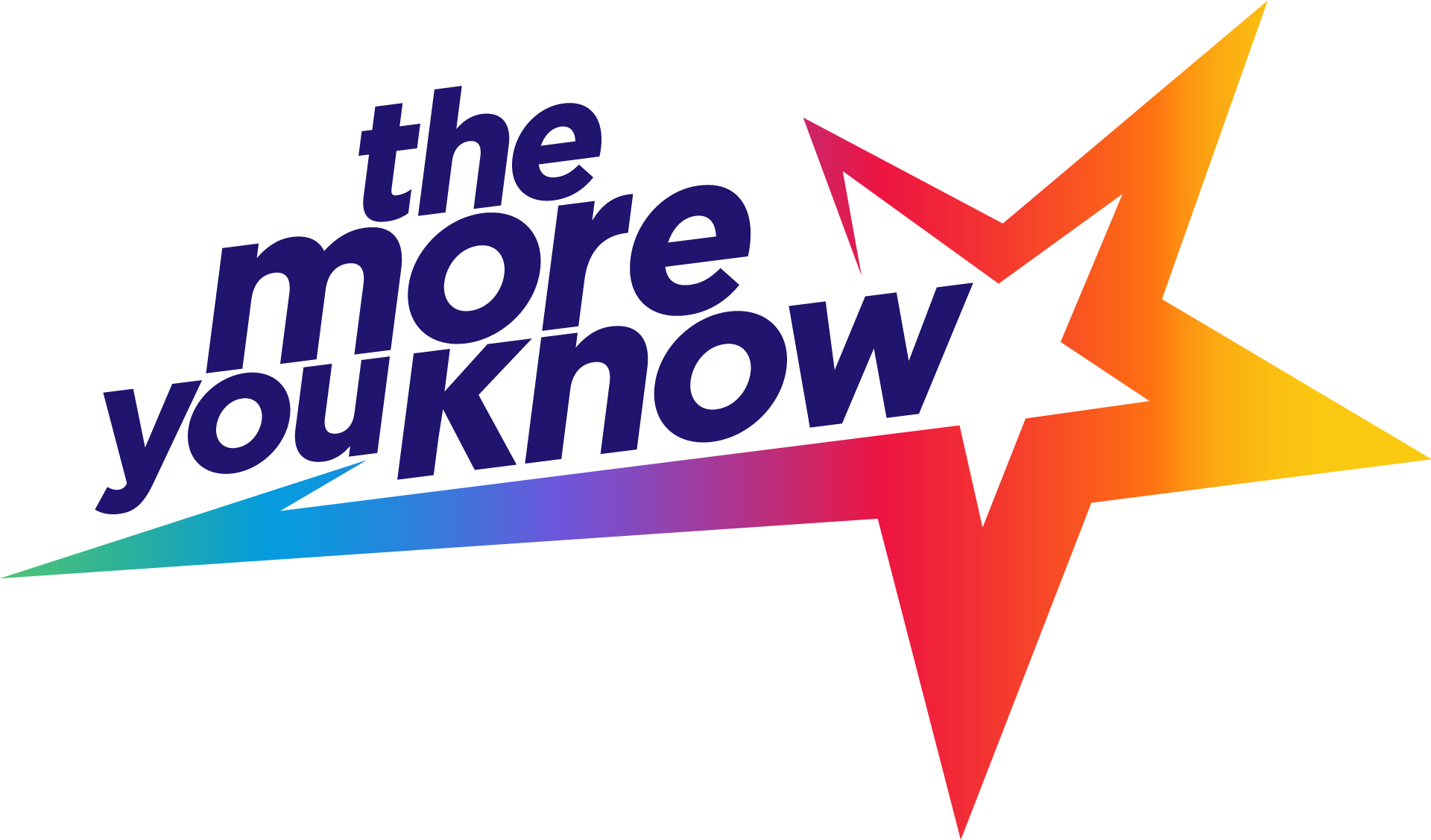
The "More You Know" logo

Between February 24, 2016, and March 1, 2016, NBC announced that it would lease its weekend morning lineup to Litton Entertainment, The More You Know starting October 2016. Named after NBC's series of public service campaigns, the three-hour weekend morning block is programmed by Litton Entertainment, and features live-action programming aimed at teenagers. Just like its predecessor, The More You Know meets the programming requirements defined by the FCC's Children's Television Act.

== Programming ==
=== Scheduling issues ===
Not all shows within NBC's weekend morning block are seen on all of the network's owned-and-operated stations and affiliates. Occasionally, some or all programs featured within the block are subject to delay or pre-emption due to local or syndicated programs scheduled by local NBC stations, or may be delayed by the network due to sporting events such as the Summer Olympic Games, the French Open, the USGA-sanctioned U.S. Open and Presidents Cup tournaments, or English Premier League soccer.

Due to regulations defined by the Children's Television Act that require stations to carry E/I compliant programming for three hours each week at any time between 7:00 a.m. and 10:00 p.m. local time, some NBC stations may defer certain programs aired within its weekend morning block to Sunday daytime or earlier weekend morning slots, or (in the case of affiliates in the Western United States) weekend afternoons as makegoods to comply with the CTA regulations.

=== List of notable programs ===
Note: Shows listed in bold are in-house productions from NBC, most of which now have their distribution rights held by NBCUniversal Syndication Studios.

Title	Run	Production companies	Original network
3-2-1 Penguins!	2006–2010	Big Idea Entertainment	Direct-to-Video
3-2-1 Penguins! and LarryBoy Adventures Stories	2006–2010	Big Idea Entertainment; DKP Effects (2002–2003); UTV Software Communications (2007–2008)	Direct-to-video
Adventure Camp	2003		Discovery Kids
The Adventures of Super Mario Bros. 3	1990–1991	DIC Animation City; Reteitalia; Nintendo of America	
Adventures of the Gummi Bears	1985–1989	Walt Disney Television Animation	
ALF Tales	1988–1990	DIC Animation City; Saban Entertainment; Alien Productions	
ALF: The Animated Series	1987–1989	DIC Animation City; Saban Entertainment; Alien Productions	
**All About Us**	2001	NBC Enterprises	
Alvin and the Chipmunks	1983–1991	Bagdasarian Productions; Ruby-Spears Enterprises (1983–1987) (seasons 1–5); Murakami-Wolf-Swenson (1988, eleven episodes); DIC Enterprises (1988–1990) (seasons 6–8)	
Astroblast!	2014–2016	Scholastic Media; Soup2Nuts	Sprout
Astro Boy	1963–1978	Mushi Production	Fuji TV (Japan)
Babar	2006–2012	Nelvana	CBC Television HBO (US)
Batman and the Super 7	1980–1981		
The Banana Splits Adventure Hour	1968–1970	Hanna-Barbera	
Big John, Little John	1976–1977		
Birdman and The Galaxy Trio	1967–1968		
The Bugaloos	1970–1972		
Brains and Brawn	1993		
Butch Cassidy and the Sundance Kids	1973–1974		
California Dreams	1992–1997		
Camp Candy	1989–1990		
Captain N: The Game Master	1989–1992		
The Champion Within with Lauren Thompson	2016–2020		
The Chica Show	2013–2016		Sprout
Chip and Pepper's Cartoon Madness	1991–1992		
City Guys	1997–2002		
Clangers	2015–2016		CBeebies (UK) Sprout (US)
Consumer 101	2018–2021		
Croc Files	2002–2005		Discovery Kids
Darcy's Wild Life	2004–2006	Temple Street	Discovery Kids
Down and Out with Donald Duck	1987		
Double Up	1992		
Earth to Luna!	2015–2016		
Earth Odyssey with Dylan Dreyer	2019–present		
Endurance	2002–2006		Discovery Kids
Fraggle Rock: The Animated Series	1987–1988	Jim Henson Productions	
Flight 29 Down	2005–2006		
The Flintstones	1966–1970, 1981	Hanna-Barbera	
The Flintstone Comedy Show	1980–1982	Hanna-Barbera	ABC (US)
The Flintstone Funnies	1982–1984 (reruns of The Flintstone Comedy Show)	Hanna-Barbera	
Floogals	2016		Sprout
The Gary Coleman Show	1982–1983		
Give	2016–2018		
The Godzilla/Dynomutt Hour with the Funky Phantom	1980		
Godzilla	1978–1981		
Gravedale High	1990		
**Hang Time**	1995–2001		
Harlem Globetrotters: Play it Forward	2022–present		
Health + Happiness with Mayo Clinic	2018		
Hong Kong Phooey	1978, 1980–1981	Hanna-Barbera	
Hoppity Hooper	1963–1966		
H.R. Pufnstuf	1969–1970	Sid & Marty Kroft Productions	
I'm Telling!	1987–1988		
The Incredible Hulk	1982–1983		
**It's Punky Brewster**	1985–1987, 1988–1989		
Jacob Two-Two	2006–2007, 2009	Nelvana	YTV (Canada)
Jane and the Dragon	2006–2008, 2009–2010, 2012		
Jeff Corwin Unleashed	2003–2005		
The Jetsons	1966–1967, 1971–1975, 1976, 1979, 1980, 1981, 1982	Hanna-Barbera	ABC (US)
Journey with Dylan Dreyer	2016–2018		
Just Deal	2000–2002		
Justin Time	2012–2014		Family (Canada) Sprout (US)
The Karate Kid	1989–1990	Columbia/Coca-Cola Television	
Kenny the Shark	2003–2005, 2006		
The Kid Super Power Hour with Shazam!	1981–1982		
Kid 'n Play	1990–1991		
Kidd Video	1984–1987		
Kimba the White Lion	1965–1980		
**Kissyfur**	1986–1990		
Land of the Lost	1974–1976, 1978		
LarryBoy Adventures	2006-2007		
LazyTown	2012–2016		Nickelodeon (US)
The Magic School Bus	2010–2011	Scholastic Nelvana	PBS/Fox Kids (US)
Make Way for Noddy	2013–2014		Five (UK) PBS (US)
Mister T	1983–1986		
Mutual of Omaha's Wild Kingdom Protecting the Wild	2023–present		
Name Your Adventure	1992–1995		
Naturally, Danny Seo	2016–2019		
NBA Inside Stuff	1990–2002		
The New Adventures of Flash Gordon	1979–1980, 1982–1983		
The New Archie and Sabrina Hour	1977	Filmation Co.	
A New Leaf	2019–2020		
Nina's World	2016		
Noodle and Doodle	2012–2016		
One Team: The Power of Sports	2021–present		
One World	1998–2001		
Operation Junkyard	2002–2003		
The New Fred and Barney Show	1979-1980	Hanna-Barbera	
Pajanimals	2012–2014	The Jim Henson Company 4Kids Entertainment	Sprout
Pearlie	2010–2012		
The Pink Panther Show	1969–1978	MGM/UA Television	
Poppy Cat	2012–2013, 2014–2015		
Prehistoric Planet	2002–2003		
ProStars	1991–1992		
Return to the Planet of the Apes	1975–1976		
The Rocky and Bullwinkle Show	1961–1964, 1981–1982	Jay Ward Productions	ABC (US)
The Roman Holidays	1972		
Roots Less Traveled	2020–present		
The Ruff and Reddy Show	1957–1958		
Ruff-Ruff, Tweet and Dave	2015–2016		
Running the Halls	1993–1994		
**Saved by the Bell**	1989–1993	Engel Productions NBC Productions	
Saved by the Bell: The New Class	1993–2000		
Scout's Safari	2002–2004	Tom Lynch Company	Discovery Kids
Sealab 2020	1972–73	Hanna-Barbera	
Shelldon	2009–2012		
Shirley Temple's Storybook	1958–1961		
Shirt Tales	1982-1984		
Sigmund and the Sea Monsters	1973–1975		
Sk8	2001–2002		
Skunked TV	2004		
The Smurfs	1981–1990	Hanna-Barbera	
Snorks	1984–1986	Hanna-Barbera	
Space Cats	1991–1992		
The Space Kidettes	1966–1967		
Space Sentinels	1977–1978	Filmation Co.	
Speed Buggy	1977	Hanna-Barbera	
Spider-Man and His Amazing Friends	1981–1986		
Star Trek: The Animated Series	1973–1975	Filmation Paramount Television	
Strange Days at Blake Holsey High	2002–2005		
Super Mario World	1991–1992		
Terrific Trucks	2015–2016		
Time Warp Trio	2005–2006		
Trading Spaces: Boys vs. Girls	2003–2006		
Turbo Dogs	2008–2009, 2010–2011		
Tutenstein	2003–2006	PorchLight Entertainment	Discovery Kids
Top Cat	1966, 1967, 1968–1969		
The Gumby Show	1956–1959		
Underdog	1964-1966, 1968–1970, 1972–1973		
VeggieTales	2006–2009		Direct-to-video
Vets Saving Pets	2018–present		
The Voyager with Josh Garcia	2016–present		
Walking with Dinosaurs	2002–2003		
Walking with Prehistoric Beasts	2002–2003		
The Wiggles	2012–2013	Wiggles Pty.	ABC Kids (AU)
Wild Child	2021–present		
Wilderness Vet with Dr. Oakley	2016-2018		
Willa's Wild Life	2009–2012	Nelvana	YTV (Canada)
Wish Kid	1991–1992		
Yo Yogi!	1991–1992		
The Zula Patrol	2008–2009, 2012	Hatchery	PBS (US)
Zou	2014		

=== Saturday morning preview specials ===
- 1973 – Starship Rescue (hosted by Kevin Tighe and Randolph Mantooth from Emergency!)
- 1974 – Preview Revue (hosted by Jimmy Osmond; featuring Johnny Whitaker)
- 1975 – Preview Revue (hosted by The Lockers; featuring Michael Landon, and Billy Barty and Johnny Whitaker from Sigmund and the Sea Monsters)
- 1976 – Smilin' Saturday Morning Parade (hosted by Freddie Prinze)
- 1977 – C'Mon Saturday (hosted by Andrea McArdle from Annie; featuring Arte Johnson, Leonard Nimoy, Muhammad Ali and Ruth Buzzi)
- 1978 – Saturday Superstars (hosted by Bay City Rollers; featuring Erik Estrada, Joe Namath and Scott Baio)
- 1983 – Yummy Awards (hosted by Ricky Schroder; special appearance by a live-action Spider-Man to promote his animated show)
- 1984 – Laugh Busters (featuring Spider-Man and His Amazing Friends, Kidd Video, Alvin and the Chipmunks, Snorks, Pink Panther and Sons, Mr. T and The Smurfs)
- 1985 – Back to Next Saturday (hosted by Keshia Knight Pulliam and Lisa Whelchel)
- 1986 – Alvin Goes Back to School
- 1987 – ALF Loves a Mystery (hosted by Benji Gregory from ALF)
- 1989 – Who Shrunk Saturday Morning? (hosted by cast of Saved by the Bell; featuring ALF, John Candy, John Moschitta Jr., Marsha Warfield and Sherman Hemsley)

== See also ==
- Lists of United States network television schedules – includes articles on Saturday morning children's programming schedules among the major networks
- Children's programming on the American Broadcasting Company
- Children's programming on CBS
- Children's programming on Telemundo
