= Nickelodeon en Telemundo =

American children's programming block (1998–2001)

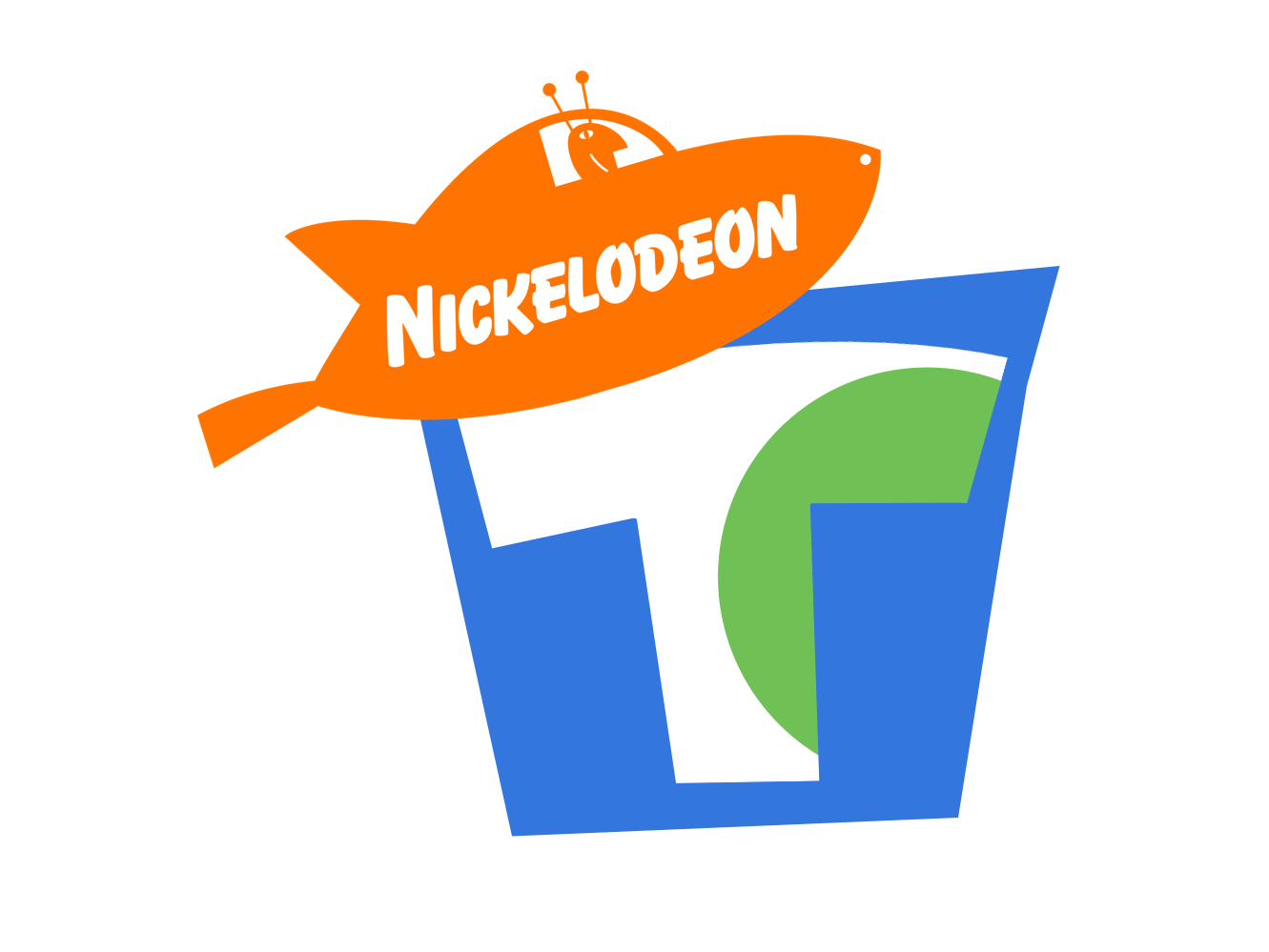
- Network: Telemundo
- Launched: November 9, 1998
- Closed: September 30, 2001
- Country of origin: United States
- Owner: Telemundo Network Group, LLC; Nickelodeon (Viacom)
- Format: Weekday morning, later weekend morning children's block
- Running time: 3 hours
- Original language: Spanish

Nickelodeon en Telemundo (English: "Nickelodeon on Telemundo") was an American children's programming block that aired on the Spanish language television network Telemundo, which debuted on November 9, 1998, replacing Telemundo Infantil on Saturday mornings. The two-hour block (which aired on Monday to Friday mornings, and on Saturday and Sunday mornings from 6:30 a.m. to 9:00 a.m. Eastern Time and Pacific Time) featured live-action and animated series aimed at children between the ages of 2 and 14.

Programs featured on the block consist almost entirely of Spanish-dubbed versions of series that were originally produced and broadcast in English (with the block featuring Spanish dubs of the joint agreement with Nickelodeon programming). All shows featured on Nickelodeon en Telemundo are designed to meet federally mandated educational programming guidelines defined by the Federal Communications Commission (FCC) through the Children's Television Act. Nickelodeon en Telemundo closed on September 30, 2001. The following week, it was replaced by Telemundo Kids.

== History ==
On September 15, 1998, Telemundo entered into a programming agreement with Viacom and Nickelodeon to carry the cable channel's programming as part of a morning children's program block, "Nickelodeon en Telemundo" ("Nickelodeon on Telemundo"). The block, which debuted on November 9, 1998 and was considered a sub-block of Telemundo Infantil, consisted of Spanish dubs of Nickelodeon's animated series aimed at older children and preschool-oriented programs aired by the channel's Nick Jr. block (such as Rugrats, Doug, Rocko's Modern Life, Aaahh!!! Real Monsters, Hey Arnold!, Blue's Clues and Dora the Explorer). Nickelodeon en Telemundo originally aired seven days a week, but it was relegated to Saturday and Sunday mornings from 7:00 a.m. to 10:00 a.m. ET/PT, as the Monday–Friday slots were discontinued in order to accommodate a time slot for Hoy En El Mundo (or Esta Manana) hosted by Jose Diaz-Balart.

On September 30, 2001, Nickelodeon en Telemundo was discontinued as Telemundo's program supply deal with Nickelodeon had expired. It was then replaced with Telemundo Kids the following week on October 6, 2001, which was a joint venture of the animation of Columbia TriStar (such as Men in Black: The Series, Dragon Tales, Jackie Chan Adventures and Max Steel). However, Dragon Ball Z (which aired on the Nickelodeon blocks) remained on Telemundo and aired on the block. Telemundo Kids was branded as Sábados de Fantasía (Fantasy Saturdays) and Domingos de Aventura (Adventure Sundays) and aired between 7:00 a.m. to 10:00 a.m. ET/PT on Saturday and Sunday mornings, some of Telemundo stations/affiliates were including the time schedule. In 2004, Nickelodeon programming returned to Telemundo and the Telemundo Kids block, but was removed by 2006, when Telemundo Kids was replaced by Qubo.

== Programming ==
=== Schedule issues ===
Although the Nickelodeon en Telemundo block regularly aired on Monday to Friday mornings, affiliates in some parts of the country deferred certain programs within the lineup to Saturday and Sunday morning time slots to accommodate locally produced programs (such as weekend morning newscasts) or due to scheduling issues with regional or network sports broadcasts that start in time periods normally occupied by the block.

=== Former programming ===
Title	Premiere date	End date	Source(s)
Nickelodeon
Rugrats	November 9, 1998	September 30, 2001	
Doug	November 1, 1999	September 22, 2000	
Rocko's Modern Life	November 9, 1998	September 22, 2000	
Aaahh!!! Real Monsters	November 9, 1998	September 22, 2000	
Hey Arnold!	November 10, 1998	September 30, 2001	
Blue's Clues	November 9, 1998	September 30, 2001	
Dora the Explorer	August 21, 2000	September 30, 2001	
Other
Dragon Ball Z	July 5, 1999	September 30, 2001	
Jumanji	November 9, 1998	September 22, 2000	
Lift Off	November 14, 1998	September 29, 2001	
Garfield and Friends	November 14, 1998	May 28, 2000	

== See also ==
- Nickelodeon on CBS
- Telemundo Kids – The block consisted of Spanish dubs of various Sony Pictures Television and BRB Internacional series, divided across Sábados de Fantasía ("Fantasy Saturdays") and Domingos de Aventura ("Adventure Sundays") from October 6, 2001 to September 3, 2006.
- Children's programming on Telemundo
