= Telemundo Kids =

American children's programming block

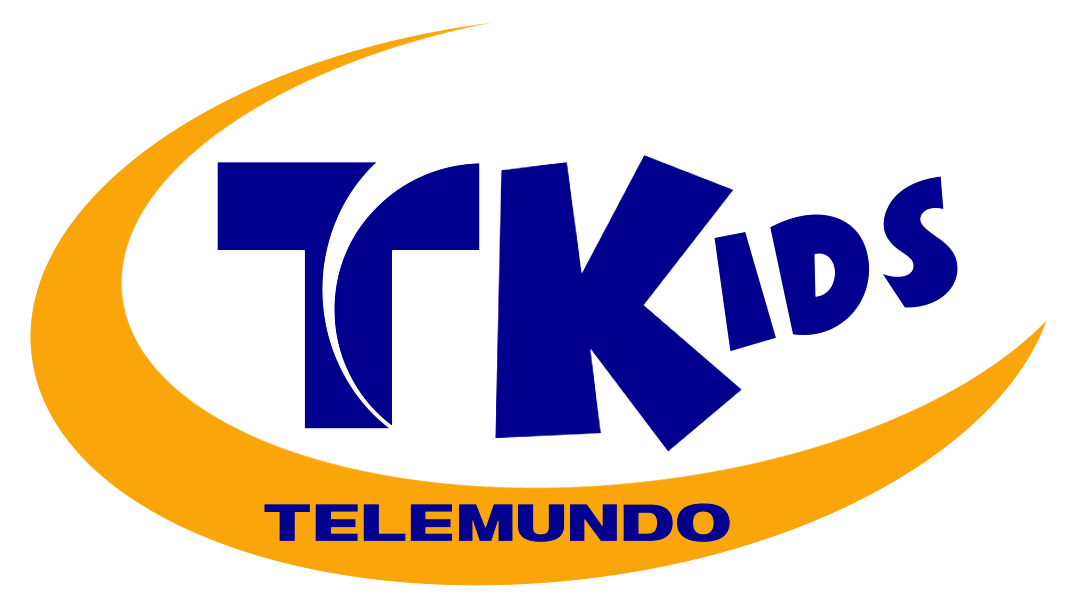
- Network: Telemundo
- Launched: October 6, 2001; 24 years ago
- Closed: September 3, 2006; 20 years ago (later became Qubo)
- Country of origin: United States
- Owner: Telemundo Network Group, LLC (NBCUniversal)
- Formerly known as: Telemundo Infantil (September 16, 1995–November 7, 1998)
- Format: Saturday and Sunday mornings children's block
- Running time: 3 hours
- Original language: Spanish
- Official website: Telemundo Kids

Telemundo Kids (borrowing its name from Telemundo's 1995–1998 Saturday morning block Telemundo Infantil) was an American children's programming block that debuted on October 6, 2001 on the Spanish-language television network Telemundo. The three-hour block, which aired on Saturday and Sunday mornings from 7:00 a.m. to 10:00 a.m. Eastern Time and Pacific Time, featured live action and animated series aimed at children between the ages of 2 and 14.

Programs featured on the block consisted of a mixture of series originally produced in Spanish and dubbed versions of series that were originally produced and broadcast in English. All shows featured on Telemundo Kids were designed to meet federally mandated educational programming guidelines defined by the Federal Communications Commission (FCC) through the Children's Television Act. Telemundo Kids closed on September 3, 2006. The following week, the block's successor Qubo en Telemundo debuted.

== History ==
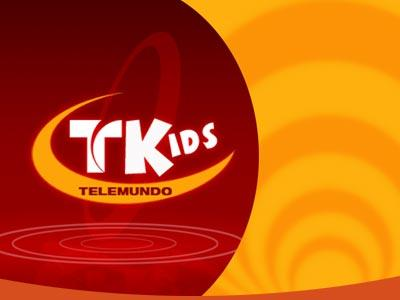
Telemundo Kids bumper used from 2001 to 2006.

=== Launch (2001–2003) ===
In October 2001, Telemundo announced that it would launch Telemundo Kids, which served as a revival to Telemundo Infantil (in English: Telemundo Kids) which aired from 1995 to 1998. The block served as a replacement to Nickelodeon en Telemundo which was discontinued on September 30, 2001, after Telemundo's program supply deal with Nickelodeon had expired. Telemundo Kids featured some programs complaint with Federal Communications Commission and educational programming requirements. The three-hour block typically ran on Saturday and Sunday mornings from 7:00 a.m. to 10:00 a.m. Eastern and Pacific Time. All other time periods were filled with infomercials (although some Telemundo affiliates chose to pre-empt the block of favor of the commercials and bumpers). The introduction a new logo with font text (Boink STD) with the orange line with the original 2000 "Telemundo" font, alongside bumpers and promos and controlled by Telemundo Network Group, LLC. (a unit of NBCUniversal).

The block included a three-hour lineup that consisted mainly of dubbed versions of American, Canadian, European animated series the network opted to fully program was mix of acquired from various programming production companies and distributors, this included partnerships with Sony Pictures Television (via Adelaide Productions) and Sesame Workshop with Dragon Tales, the Japanese-based animation studio Toei Animation, the European-based animation studio BRB International and the Canadian-based animation studio Nelvana. The block was divided across Sábados de Fantasía ("Fantasy Saturdays") and Domingos de Aventura ("Adventure Sundays"). The block's initial lineup consisted mainly of shows originally produced and broadcast in English included Ni Ni's Treehouse, Men in Black: The Series, Dragon Tales, Jackie Chan Adventures and Max Steel, as well as the Japanese anime series such as Dragon Ball Z.

=== Return of Nickelodeon programming (2004–2006) ===
On October 2, 2004, Nickelodeon-produced shows returned to Telemundo three years after Nickelodeon en Telemundo's closure. Programming featured on the block included Rugrats, Hey Arnold!, and Dora the Explorer (all of which aired on both Nickelodeon en Telemundo and Nick on CBS/Nick Jr. on CBS), along with All Grown Up!. Three Canadian shows also joined the lineup, consisting of Wimzie's House from CBC, Monster by Mistake and the Nelvana-produced show, Jacob Two-Two from YTV. At the time, Nelvana began combining production shows of the agreement with Telefutura (a sister channel to competing Spanish network Univision) by acquiring programs for the network’s own children's programming block, Toonturama, featuring seven shows (such as Tales from the Cryptkeeper, Cadillacs and Dinosaurs, Stickin' Around, Anatole, Ned's Newt, Mythic Warriors and The Dumb Bunnies) as part of the growing cross-promotion aired from 2002 to 2005.

=== Discontinuation and transition to Qubo ===
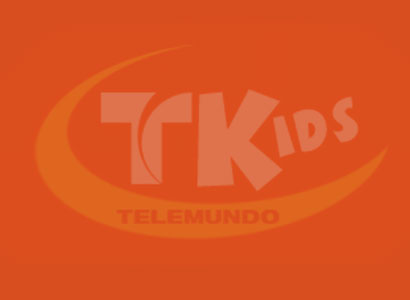
Telemundo Kids screen bug used from 2001 to 2006; including fade orange container in Telemundo website from 2003.

Following the sale of Telemundo to NBC back in 2001 and CBS and Viacom's split in early 2006, in May of that year, NBCUniversal and Ion Media Networks unveiled a joint venture with Corus Entertainment (and its subsidiary Nelvana), Scholastic, Classic Media (and its subsidiary Big Idea Productions) known as Qubo, which would aim to provide educational programming aimed at children between the ages of 4 and 8. This multi-platform programming endeavor would comprise children's programming blocks consisting of two English versions on NBC and Ion Media's i: Independent Television (now Ion Television) respectively, as well as a Spanish version on Telemundo. The endeavor would also include a separate 24-hour digital multicast channel on i’s owned-and-operated stations (alternatively known as Qubo Channel), a video on demand service, and a branded website.

For Telemundo, the Qubo endeavor included a three-hour morning block divided into two 90-minute blocks airing on both Saturdays and Sundays. It would be the network's first and only children's block to offer English subtitles via the CC3 caption channel, which Telemundo normally utilizes for its weeknight prime time lineup. Conversely, the companion blocks on both NBC and i, as well as the standalone Qubo Channel, would all utilize the CC3 track to transmit Spanish subtitles, with Qubo Channel alone further supporting Spanish-speaking audiences with the inclusion of a Spanish audio track accessible via the second audio program (SAP) feed.

Telemundo Kids was officially discontinued on September 3, 2006, and was replaced by Qubo en Telemundo the following week on September 9. While Jacob Two-Two transitioned to the new block the following day on September 10, all other prior programming, including the Nickelodeon shows, was dropped from Telemundo’s lineup. The overall launch of the Qubo brand marked the first time that VeggieTales was broadcast as a television program (although the religious content was edited out at the request of NBC's standards and practices department), with the companion Qubo on NBC block also facilitating the first English-language broadcast of Jacob Two-Two on American television. The Qubo on i block launched less than a week later on September 15, while the standalone Qubo Channel launched nearly four months afterwards on January 8, 2007.

Due to Discovery declining to renew its contract with NBC for its Saturday morning Discovery Kids on NBC block after March 2006, the discontinuation of Telemundo Kids occurred concurrently with the discontinuation of Discovery Kids on NBC, citing a desire to focus its children's programming efforts exclusively on the Discovery Kids cable channel.

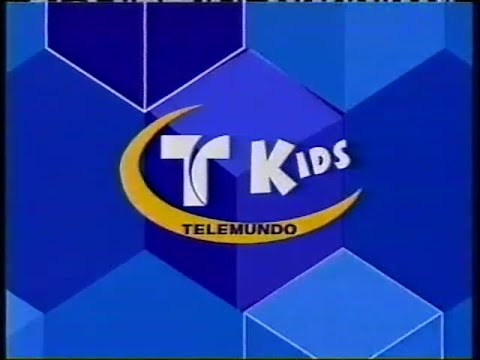
Telemundo Kids ID from 2001 to 2006.

=== Transferring of Nickelodeon programs to other networks ===
Though Telemundo dropped Nickelodeon programming from its lineup following the launch of Qubo en Telemundo, some Nickelodeon programs would move to other children's programming blocks.

When rival network Univision launched its Planeta U block on April 5, 2008, the inaugural lineup included two Nick Jr. shows, Dora the Explorer and its spin-off Go, Diego, Go!, as well as Pinky Dinky Doo from Nickelodeon’s sister network Noggin (now the Nick Jr. Channel). Contrary to Telemundo’s broadcasts of Dora the Explorer, Univision incorporated on-screen captions of the Spanish words spoken in English. Another Nick Jr. show, The Backyardigans would later join the lineup on June 25, 2011. On September 3 of that year, Pinky Dinky Doo was pulled from the lineup, being replaced by PBS Kids' Maya & Miguel the following week. A major programming shift occurred on May 24, 2014, when Dora the Explorer and Go, Diego, Go! were pulled together from the lineup to accommodate the launch of “Disney Junior en Univision” during the first two hours of the block, adding Spanish dubs of both Mickey Mouse Clubhouse and Handy Manny (both of which originally premiered on Playhouse Disney in 2006, with the latter show having premiered the next day after the launch of the Qubo on i block). The final Nick Jr. holdover, The Backyardigans, was eventually pulled on July 25, 2015 replaced by Sesame Amigos the following week, (produced by Sesame Workshop exclusively for the network).

In addition, for a short time between July and October 2010, Tr3s, another sister network to Nickelodeon, aired a daily block of Spanish-dubbed Nick Jr. programs under the name Tr3s Jr. to meet E/I requirements for its broadcast affiliates. Shows like Blue's Clues (previously seen on Nickelodeon en Telemundo) and Wonder Pets! were featured in the block, with SpongeBob SquarePants also being broadcast outside of the Tr3s Jr. schedule.

Despite these program migrations, Telemundo would eventually air reruns of LazyTown from July 7, 2012 to March 26, 2016 as part of MiTelemundo, a block programmed by PBS Kids Sprout that replaced Qubo en Telemundo. After the Nick Jr. Channel lost the broadcast rights to LazyTown on July 19, 2010, the show moved to Sprout from April 18, 2011 to September 26, 2016.

== Programming ==
=== Schedule issues ===
Due to regulations defined by the Children's Television Act that require stations to carry E/I compliant programming for three hours each week at any time between 7:00 a.m. and 10:00 p.m. local time, some Telemundo stations defered certain programs aired within its Saturday morning block to Sunday daytime or earlier Saturday morning slots, or (in the case of affiliates in the Western United States) Saturday afternoons as makegoods to comply with the CTA regulations.

Although the Telemundo Kids block regularly aired on Saturday and Sunday mornings, affiliates in some parts of the country deferred certain programs within the lineup to Sunday morning time slots to accommodate locally produced programs (such as weekend morning newscasts) or due to scheduling issues with regional or network sports broadcasts that start in time periods normally occupied by the block.

Telemundo Kids had concerns about commercial limits during its programming to its affiliates, including KTEL-TV in Albuquerque, New Mexico.

The six Telemundo Kids animated and live-action Spanish-dubbed shows including Jackie Chan Adventures, Dragon Tales, Juana la Iguana, Las Tres Mellizas, Nico and Dragon Ball Z were having a changed schedule for a weekend as the Sábados de Fantasía (Fantasy Saturdays) block aired on every Saturday, but the six shows were still included with Domingos de Aventura (Adventure Sundays) in scheduled and changing the time at 6:00 a.m. to 12:00 p.m. ET/PT on Telemundo since October 25, 2003 with the paid programming continued with Telemundo Kids in the next schedule time clock area on weekends.

However, other shows (including Men in Black: The Series, Max Steel, Ni Ni's Treehouse, Auga Viva, Bizbirije and Toonimals!) were removed or changed in the schedule on October 19, 2003, while the schedule was changed again when Nickelodeon programming return to air four shows and some Canadian shows with Spanish-dubbed in Telemundo Kids premiered on October 2, 2004.

Not only were changing schedules and commercial limits had concerns on the children programming block, they were also delays on programming premieres. Men in Black: The Series was originally scheduled to premiere on the block on November 11, 2001. However, it was delayed for one week due to scheduling issues with Dragon Tales on Telemundo at 7:30 a.m. Men in Black: The Series was rescheduled to November 18, 2001.

=== Former Telemundo Kids shows programming ===
Title	Premiere date	End date	Source(s)
Sábados de Fantasía
Ni Ni's Treehouse^{E/I}	October 6, 2001	April 26, 2003	
Agua Viva^{E/I}	October 6, 2001	April 26, 2003	
Las Tres Mellizas^{E/I}	October 6, 2001	December 28, 2003	
Bizbirije^{E/I}	October 6, 2001	April 26, 2003	
Nico^{E/I}	October 6, 2001	May 15, 2004	
Toonimals!^{E/I}	October 6, 2001	April 27, 2003	
Domingos de Aventura
Dragon Ball Z	October 7, 2001	August 24, 2003	
Men in Black: The Series	October 7, 2001	April 27, 2003	
Juana la Iguana^{E/I}	October 7, 2001	April 3, 2004	
Dragon Tales^{E/I}	October 7, 2001	September 26, 2004	
Jackie Chan Adventures	October 7, 2001	September 26, 2004	
Max Steel	October 7, 2001	October 27, 2002	
Telemundo re-acquired Nickelodeon programming
Wimzie's House^{E/I}	October 2, 2004	September 2, 2006	
Monster by Mistake^{E/I}	October 2, 2004	September 10, 2005	
Dora the Explorer^{E/I}	October 2, 2004	September 3, 2006	
Hey Arnold!	October 3, 2004	January 2, 2005	
All Grown Up!	October 3, 2004	January 2, 2005	
Rugrats	January 9, 2005	September 3, 2006	
Jacob Two-Two^{E/I}	January 9, 2005	September 2, 2006	
Telemuñequitos/Telemundo Infantil
Mazinger Z	August 22, 1987	March 12, 1989	
Galactic Gale Baxingar	August 22, 1987	March 18, 1989	
Future Boy Conan	October 26, 1987	November 27, 1987	
Cartoon All-Stars to the Rescue	April 21, 1990		
Kolitas	October 4, 1990	May 9, 1999	
Looney Tunes	June 1, 1992	May 17, 1998	
Popeye the Sailor	June 1, 1992	May 17, 1998	
Merrie Melodies	June 1, 1992	May 17, 1998	
Nubeluz	June 6, 1992	September 14, 1996	
The Biskitts	June 8, 1992	January 10, 1994	
Goober and the Ghost Chasers	June 9, 1992	January 13, 1994	
Inch High, Private Eye	June 10, 1992	January 12, 1994	
Buford and the Galloping Ghost	June 12, 1992	January 14, 1994	
Captain Scarlet and the Mysterons	September 27, 1992	August 24, 1997	
Captain Tsubasa	January 17, 1994	December 2, 1994	
Oakie Doke	September 16, 1995	November 7, 1998	
Button Moon	September 16, 1995	November 7, 1998	
La Isla de Jordán	June 7, 1997	April 10, 1999	
Lift Off	January 12, 1998	September 29, 2001	
Garfield and Friends	January 12, 1998	May 28, 2000	
Jumanji	November 9, 1998	September 22, 2000	

== See also ==
- Children's programming on Telemundo
  - Nickelodeon en Telemundo - Telemundo entered into a programming agreement with Nickelodeon to carry the cable channel's programming as part of a morning children's program block.
  - Qubo - Successor block to Telemundo Kids, which then became exclusive to both a programming block on Ion Television and a standalone 24-hour digital multicast network until its closure in 2021.
  - NBC Kids/MiTelemundo - Telemundo also aired a version of the block under "MiTelemundo" brand, which was aired same as the main program, featuring a separate lineup of Spanish-dubbed programs from July 7, 2012, until December 31, 2017.
- Planeta U - A programming block on Univision that launched on April 5, 2008. Several Nick Jr. shows were once included within the lineup. The block has been unbranded since 2025.
- Discovery Kids on NBC - The block was produced under a time-lease agreement with Discovery Kids.
- TNBC - An American teen-oriented programming block that aired on NBC from September 12, 1992, to September 28, 2002.
