= Tod Carter =

Animation director, writer and storyboard artist

- Born: November 18; Chicago, Illinois
- Occupations: Animation director, writer, storyboard artist

Tod Carter (born November 18 in Chicago, Illinois) is an American animation director, writer and storyboard artist who contributed to feature films and many direct-to-video productions.

Carter's contributions can be seen in Space Jam and Disney sequels for Hunchback of Notre Dame, Little Mermaid, Tarzan, and The Fox and the Hound. He has also contributed as the head of writing and story development for many films and projects for Big Idea Productions, producers of the highly successful VeggieTales, 3-2-1 Penguins and Larryboy series. He currently directs animated projects for Brain Freeze Entertainment, a company which he founded in 2008.

Carter's animation work also includes Quest for Camelot, which was nominated for an Annie Award for "Outstanding Achievement in an Animated Theatrical Feature."

== Filmography ==
=== TV Series ===
- Britannica's Tales Around the World (1991)
  - Beauty and the Beast/The Chinese Parrot/Sedna (1991): animation staff (segment "Sedna")
- McGee and Me! (1992)
  - Beauty in the Least (1992): animator:StarToons
- Tiny Toon Adventures (1992):
  - It's a Wonderful Tiny Toons Christmas Special (1992): assistant animator
- Animaniacs (1993-1994):
  - The Warner's Lot Song/The Big Candy Store/Bumbie's Mom (1993): animation services:StarToons
  - Guardin' the Garden/Plane Pals (1993): animation services:StarToons
  - Mary Tyler Dot Song/Windsor Hassle/…And Justice for Slappy (1993): animation services:StarToons
  - Branimaniacs/The Warners and the Beanstalk/Frontier Slappy (1994): animation services:StarToons
  - Ragamuffins/Woodstock Slappy (1994): animation services:StarToons
- VeggieTales (2000-2015):
  - King George and the Ducky (2000): storyboard artist
  - Esther… The Girl Who Became Queen (2000): additional storyboard artist, additional concept artist
  - Lyle the Kindly Viking (2001): storyboard artist
  - The Star of Christmas (2002): storyboard artist
  - The Ballad of Little Joe (2003): additional storyboard artist
  - An Easter Carol (2004): storyboard artist
  - Sumo of the Opera (2004): writer, storyboard artist
  - Duke and the Great Pie War (2005): storyboard artist
  - Minnesota Cuke and the Search for Samson's Hairbrush (2006): storyboard artist
  - Lord of the Beans (2006): storyboard artist
  - Sheerluck Holmes and the Golden Ruler (2006): storyboard artist
  - Larry-Boy and the Bad Apple (2006): storyboard artist
  - Gideon Tuba Warrior (2006): storyboard artist
  - Moe and the Big Exit (2007): storyboard artist
  - The Wonderful Wizard of Ha's (2007): storyboard artist
  - Tomato Sawyer and Huckleberry Larry's Big River Rescue (2008): story development, story supervisor, concept artist
  - Abe and the Amazing Promise (2009): story development, story supervisor, concept artist
  - Minnesota Cuke and the Search for Noah's Umbrella (2009): story supervisor
  - Saint Nicholas: A Story of Joyful Giving (2009): story supervisor
  - Pistachio: The Little Boy That Woodn't (2010): story supervisor
  - Sweetpea Beauty (2010): story supervisor
  - It's a Meaningful Life (2010): story supervisor
  - {'}Twas the Night Before Easter (2011): storyboard artist
  - Princess and the Popstar (2011): storyboard artist
  - The Little Drummer Boy (2011): storyboard artist
  - Robin Good and His Not-So-Merry Men (2012): storyboard artist
  - The Penniless Princess (2012): storyboard artist
  - The League of Incredible Vegetables (2012): storyboard artist
  - The Little House That Stood (2013): storyboard artist
  - MacLarry & The Stinky Cheese Battle (2013): storyboard artist
  - Merry Larry and the True Light of Christmas (2013): storyboard artist
  - Veggies in Space: The Fennel Frontier (2014): storyboard artist
  - Celery Night Fever (2014): storyboard artist
  - Beauty and the Beet (2014): storyboard artist
  - Noah's Ark (2015): storyboard artist
- 3-2-1 Penguins! (2000-2008)
  - Trouble on Planet Wait-Your-Turn (2000): story artist, concept artist
  - The Cheating Scales of Bullamanka (2001): story artist, concept artist
  - The Amazing Carnival of Complaining (2001): story artist, concept artist
  - I Scream, You Scream! (2007): story artist, concept artist
  - The Green-Eyed Monster (2007): director, story artist, concept artist
  - Lazy Daze (2007): story artist, concept artist
  - More is More (2007): story artist, concept artist
  - Give & Let Give (2007): story artist, concept artist
  - Practical Hoax (2008): story artist, concept artist
  - Comedy of Errors (2008): director, story artist, concept artist
  - Compassion Crashin' (2008): story artist, concept artist
  - Wiki Tiki (2008): story artist, concept artist
  - Invasion of the Body Swappers! (2008): story artist, concept artist
  - Git Along Little Doggies! (2008): director, story artist, concept artist
  - Wise Guys (2008): story artist, concept artist
  - Hogs and Kisses (2008): story artist, concept artist
  - 12 Angry Hens (2008): story artist, concept artist
  - Kennel Club Blues (2008): director, story artist, concept artist
  - Oh Mercy! (2008): story artist, concept artist
  - Promises, Promises (2008): story artist, concept artist
  - Do Unto Brothers (2008): director, story artist, concept artist
  - Between an Asteroid and a Hard Place (2008): story artist, concept artist
  - In the Big House (2008): story artist, concept artist
- Larryboy: The Cartoon Adventures (2002)
  - Larry and the Angry Eyebrows (2002): story development
  - Leggo My Ego (2002): writer (segment "Cuke of All Trades!")
- Superbook (2011-2013):
  - In the Beginning (2011): character designer, story artist
  - The Test! (2011): story artist
  - Jacob and Esau (2011): character designer, story artist
  - The Ten Commandments (2011): story artist
  - A Giant Adventure (2011): character designer
  - Roar! (2011): storyboard artist
  - Miracles of Jesus (2011): story artist
  - The Last Supper (2011): story artist
  - The First Christmas (2011): story artist, character designer
  - He is Risen! (2012): story artist
  - The Road to Damascus (2012): story artist
  - Revelation: The Final Battle! (2012): story artist
  - Joseph and Pharaoh's Dream (2013): revisions
  - The Fiery Furnace (2013): revisions
  - Rahab and the Walls of Jericho (2013): revisions
  - John the Baptist (2013): revisions
  - Paul and the Shipwreck (2013): revisions
  - Noah and the Ark (2013): revisions
