= Qubo =

American children's television brand (2006–2021)

- Type: Television network Programming block
- Country: United States
- Broadcast area: National
- Network: NBC (2006–12); Telemundo (2006–12); Ion Television (2006–21); Ion Plus (2020–21)
- Affiliates: List of Qubo affiliates
- Headquarters: West Palm Beach, Florida

Programming
- Languages: English; Spanish (Note: Telemundo block; also as SAP option on Qubo Channel for select programs)
- Picture format: 480i 16:9 (SDTV)

Ownership
- Owner: Ion Media (2006–21); Scripps (2021)
- Parent: Ion Media (2006–21); NBCUniversal (2006–12); Corus Entertainment (2006–13); Scholastic Corporation (2006–13); Classic Media (2006–13)
- Sister channels: Ion Television; Ion Plus; Ion Shop

History
- Launched: September 9, 2006; 20 years ago (programming blocks on NBC and Telemundo); September 15, 2006; 20 years ago (programming block on Ion Television); January 8, 2007; 19 years ago (network); September 8, 2020; 6 years ago (programming block on Ion Plus)
- Closed: June 30, 2012; 14 years ago (programming block on NBC); July 1, 2012; 14 years ago (programming block on Telemundo); February 22, 2021; 5 years ago (programming block on Ion Plus); February 26, 2021; 5 years ago (network on most stations; also programming block on Ion Television); February 28, 2021; 5 years ago (network on remaining stations)

Links
- Website: qubo.com (archived 2021)

Qubo (/ˈkjuːboʊ/ KYEW-boh; stylized in all lowercase) was an American television brand for children between the ages of 5 and 14. Owned by Ion Media, and previously a joint venture that also included NBCUniversal, Corus Entertainment, Scholastic Corporation, and DreamWorks Classics, the brand consisted of a 24-hour free-to-air television network often referred to as Qubo Channel (available as a digital terrestrial television service on owned-and-operated stations and some affiliates of corporate sister Ion Television, as well as on some pay television providers), an associated website with games and programs available through video on demand, and a series of programming blocks on Ion Television, Ion Plus, NBC and Telemundo.

Following Ion Media's acquisition by the E. W. Scripps Company, the network closed on February 28, 2021.

== History ==
=== Formation ===
On May 8, 2006, Ion Media Networks (formerly known as Paxson Communications until February 2006), NBCUniversal (which owned a 32% interest in Ion Media at the time), Corus Entertainment, Scholastic Corporation and Classic Media announced plans to launch a new, multi-platform children's entertainment brand oriented towards providing "educational, values-oriented programming" targeted towards children between 5 and 14 years of age. Originally announced under the name Smart Place for Kids, the official name Qubo was announced in August 2006. The brand would encompass programming blocks on NBCUniversal and Ion's respective flagship broadcast television networks (NBC, Telemundo and Ion Television), a video on demand service, a website, and a standalone 24-hour network carried as a digital subchannel on terrestrial television stations owned by Ion Media Networks and by pay TV providers.

Qubo president Rick Rodríguez (who formerly served as a programming executive at Discovery Communications) stated in a 2008 interview with Multichannel News that Qubo was designed as a bilingual brand, offering programming in both English and Spanish. While Qubo would initially carry Spanish-language dubs of its programming for its Telemundo block, Rodríguez did not rule out the possibility of developing original children's programming aimed at Hispanic and Latino audiences through Qubo. He felt that the market for Spanish-language children's programming had been underserved by existing outlets (such as Telemundo and Univision), and envisioned the possibility of programming which could "bridge the gap" and educate Spanish-speaking children on the English language, and vice versa.

The Qubo brand was intended to represent a "building block for kids," as reflected by its logo. The name "Qubo" was chosen because it had a "fun" sound, and the root word, "cube", was nearly crosslingual in both English and Spanish (cubo).

=== Launch of programming blocks ===
Qubo launched on September 9, 2006, with the premiere of weekend morning blocks on both NBC (which ran for three hours exclusively on Saturday mornings, replacing Discovery Kids on NBC, a weekly block programmed by the Discovery Kids cable network) and Telemundo (which divided the three-hour lineup into two 90-minute blocks airing on both Saturday and Sunday mornings, replacing Telemundo Kids). This was followed by the September 15 introduction of a three-hour daytime block on Ion Television (then known as i: Independent Television, and previously PAX TV prior to June 2005), which initially aired on Friday afternoons and marked the return of children's programming to the network for the first time since the discontinuation of the Pax Kids block in 2000. At launch, its programming included the first-run animated series Dragon (produced by Scholastic), Jacob Two-Two, Babar, and Jane and the Dragon (all produced by Corus Entertainment subsidiary Nelvana), alongside VeggieTales and its two spin-offs, 3-2-1 Penguins! and Larryboy: The Cartoon Adventures (all produced by Classic Media subsidiary Big Idea), marking the first time that VeggieTales had been broadcast as a television program.

Four of the seven shows listed on Qubo's inaugural schedule (Dragon, Jane and the Dragon, 3-2-1 Penguins!, and Larryboy: The Cartoon Adventures) premiered on American television for the first time. The Babar television series originally aired on HBO in the 1990s, though its brief sixth season revival (which ran from January-March 2001 on TVO in Canada) would only debut on American television via Qubo. Prior to the television series' American run on HBO, NBC also aired two standalone Babar specials narrated by Peter Ustinov and produced by Lee Mendelson and Bill Melendez: The Story of Babar, the Little Elephant on October 21, 1968, and Babar Comes to America on September 7, 1971. In addition, though VeggieTales aired as a television program on Qubo, there were two VeggieTales specials that were previously broadcast on television beforehand: VeggieTales Christmas Spectacular! on Ion's precursor, PAX TV, on December 19, 1998, and VeggieTales: The Star of Christmas on PBS on November 24, 2002, with repeat broadcasts of the latter airing until 2006. Jacob Two-Two originally premiered on American television on January 9, 2005 with its Spanish dub on Telemundo through its predecessor block, Telemundo Kids, making it the only show from that block to immediately transition to Qubo en Telemundo. The companion Qubo blocks on both NBC and Ion did, however, premiere Jacob Two-Two in English for the first time on American television.

==== Edits to Big Idea’s programming ====
VeggieTales and its spin-offs incorporated lessons related to Christian values; initially, this religious content was edited out of the original VeggieTales broadcasts on Qubo at the request of NBC's standards and practices department. The move, however, drew criticism from the conservative watchdog group Parents Television Council, which filed a complaint against NBC. A representative for NBC replied in a statement that the editing conformed to guidelines within the network's broadcast standards "not to advocate any one religious point of view". VeggieTales creator Phil Vischer also expressed discontent with the edits, stating that he was not informed that religious content would be removed from the series, and that he would have refused to sign a contract with Qubo if he had known of the decision beforehand. Vischer said, "I would have declined partly because I knew a lot of fans would feel like it was a sellout or it was done for money." Still, Vischer added that he understood NBC's wish to remain religiously neutral, and said, "VeggieTales is religious, NBC is not. I want to focus people more on 'Isn't it cool that Bob and Larry are on television?'".

When 3-2-1 Penguins! and Larryboy: The Cartoon Adventures were initially aired on Qubo, they were presented together under the title 3-2-1 Penguins! and Larryboy Stories, with episodes alternating between the two shows. This arrangement was made because Larryboy had only four episodes (due to its cancellation following Big Idea’s bankruptcy back in 2003), while 3-2-1 Penguins! had six episodes at the time. Additional material, including “Larryboy and the Bad Apple” from the original VeggieTales series, and a new episode titled “Songs from Cosmic Café” (which incorporated several songs from 3-2-1 Penguins!), brought the total episode count to 13. This lineup continued to be broadcast in reruns until September 29, 2007, when it was replaced by the second season premiere of 3-2-1 Penguins! the following week. Subsequently, the combined series ceased broadcasting, leading to the original six direct-to-video episodes of 3-2-1 Penguins! (including “Songs from Cosmic Café”) and the entire Larryboy series being dropped from Qubo's lineup.

The main VeggieTales series continued to air on all of Qubo’s platforms until 2009, while the second and third seasons of 3-2-1 Penguins! remained on each of the respective Qubo blocks until 2010, and on the standalone Qubo Channel until 2014.

=== Launch of standalone network and expanded carriage agreements ===
Variant of Qubo's logo with the word "channel" beneath. Used for the 24-hour standalone network launched on January 8, 2007.

In December 2006, a Spanish-language version of the Qubo website was launched. The 24-hour standalone Qubo Channel launched on the DT2 subchannel of Ion Media Networks' terrestrial stations on January 8, 2007 (three weeks ahead of its parent network's rebrand to Ion Television on January 29), replacing Ion's timeshift channel. The network initially included a schedule of children's programming in rolling four-hour blocks; Ion intended to attempt carriage of the channel on pay TV providers. In May of that year, NBCUniversal sold its minority stake in Ion Media Networks to Citadel LLC. On December 3, 2007, Qubo expanded its programming offerings to include shows from other producers, as well as some programs that were already airing on each of the Qubo blocks. In addition, the rolling schedule was expanded to a six-hour block, which repeated four times per day. By 2010, the channel adopted a more traditional schedule featuring a larger array of programs.

In January 2008, Ion Media Networks and Comcast reached an agreement to continue carrying Ion's digital terrestrial channels, including Qubo and Ion Life. In August 2008, Qubo introduced guidelines for advertisers in an effort to help fight childhood obesity, committing to only accept advertisements for products which meet nutritional guidelines determined by the network in partnership with childhood obesity expert Goutham Rao. Qubo also began to air a series of public service announcements featuring characters from its programs in association with the Ad Council, the United States Olympic Committee and the Department of Health and Human Services, advocating exercise and healthy living.

In May 2009, Ion Media Networks filed an inquiry with the Federal Communications Commission to attempt must-carry subscription television carriage to expand Qubo's distribution to other providers. Later in May 2010, Ion signed carriage agreements with Advanced Cable Communications and Blue Ridge Communications, as well as a deal with Comcast's Colorado Springs system to add Qubo on the providers' digital tiers.

=== Ion acquisition of partner stakes ===
In 2012, NBCUniversal withdrew from the joint venture following its acquisition by Comcast, resulting in Ion Media Networks acquiring NBCUniversal's interest in the venture. On March 28 of that year, it was announced that NBC and Telemundo would discontinue their Qubo blocks and replace them with NBC Kids and MiTelemundo on July 7. Both blocks would be programmed by Sprout, a preschool-oriented television network that originated from a previous joint venture between Comcast, PBS, HIT Entertainment and Sesame Workshop, and later came under NBCUniversal ownership as part of the Comcast merger. The Qubo block ended its run on NBC on June 30, followed by Telemundo on July 1, leaving Ion Television as the only remaining network with a Qubo-branded programming block. The standalone Qubo Channel also continued to operate.

Ion Media Networks later acquired the remaining stakes in Qubo held by Classic Media (which became DreamWorks Classics in 2012 after its acquisition by DreamWorks Animation), Scholastic Corporation and Corus Entertainment in 2013, with all three companies retaining program distribution partnerships with the network.

The Qubo block on Ion Television has seen numerous schedule changes throughout its run, switching to a one-hour afternoon slot each Wednesday through Friday, and later to a three-hour Friday morning slot. The block was later rebranded as the "Qubo Kids Corner" on January 4, 2015, concurrent with the block's initial move to Sunday mornings. On September 8, 2020, the block also began airing on Ion Plus during Monday mornings due to E/I commitments, since they had eight stations in the network that had DT1 main-channel carriage rather than subchannel carriage.

=== Scripps purchase and shutdown ===
On September 24, 2020, the E. W. Scripps Company announced an agreement to buy Ion Media for $2.65 billion. The transaction, which closed on January 7, 2021, saw Ion's networks integrated into Katz Broadcasting, Scripps's subsidiary for its own multicast networks, later merged into Scripps Networks. For several Ion networks, including Qubo, Ion Plus and Ion Shop, it would be a short-lived period under Katz's management.

On January 14, 2021, Scripps announced that it would discontinue Ion Shop and Qubo on February 28, with Ion Plus transitioning to a FAST service. The spectrum allocated to the three networks would be repurposed to carry Katz-owned networks starting March 1, with the initial slate of Ion Television O&Os adding those networks following the expiration of Scripps/Katz's existing contracts with other broadcasting companies the day prior, and other stations following suit as contracts with existing affiliates expired throughout 2021 and 2022; in markets where major network affiliates operated by Scripps already carried a Katz-owned network, the networks were load balanced and freed up onto Ion stations due to limited spectrum capacity during the ATSC 3.0 transition, along with Ion's existing carriage deals with Qurate's home shopping networks, QVC and HSN, along with their own secondary channels.

Qubo's shutdown was unacknowledged on-air outside occasional ticker announcements and the withdrawal of promotional advertising that no longer applied. Some affiliates abruptly switched the night of February 26 to other Katz networks, while others were switched automatically when Qubo officially closed shortly before midnight on February 28, 2021. For the remaining providers that carried Qubo until the February 28 closure, the channel shut down during an episode of Inspector Gadget, with the episode being "The Coo-Coo Clock Caper".

Following Qubo's closure, Scripps continued to utilize an unbranded outside-sourced three-hour block of programming on Ion Television in order to meet their E/I mandate on Friday mornings. Although programming that aired on Qubo's Ion block was retained, the Qubo branding was removed. The Qubo website redirected to the main Ion website shortly thereafter, then completely shut down.

== Programming ==
Qubo featured archived content from the programming libraries of NBCUniversal, Corus Entertainment (primarily from its Nelvana unit), Scholastic Corporation, DreamWorks Animation, Classic Media (including its Big Idea Entertainment unit), Trilogy Animation Group, WildBrain, 9 Story Media Group and Splash Entertainment, with its programs targeted all ages 5 to 14. Though there was a first agreement of the two companies (NBCUniversal and Ion Media) to produce a new series for the network and program block each year, Qubo only produced three original series: My Friend Rabbit (2007–08), Turbo Dogs (2008–2011), and season 1 of Shelldon (2009–2012). Qubo regularly broadcast series aimed at preschoolers during the morning and afternoon hours, while series aimed at older children were featured as part of the network's evening schedule.

Programming on both Qubo Channel and its companion Qubo blocks on NBC, Telemundo, Ion Television, and Ion Plus accounted for all educational and informative (E/I) programming, relieving Ion Media (both its O&O stations and certain Ion affiliates that carry the 24-hour channel) from the responsibility of carrying programs compliant with guidelines dictated by the Children's Television Act on its other subchannel services. This allowed Ion to carry Ion Shop, HSN and QVC without overlaying any E/I programming on those subchannels.

=== Schedule issues ===
Although the Qubo blocks on both NBC and Telemundo regularly aired on Saturday mornings (with Telemundo’s Qubo block also broadcasting on Sunday mornings), affiliates in some parts of the country deferred certain programs within the lineup to Sunday morning timeslots to accommodate locally produced programs (such as weekend morning newscasts) or due to scheduling issues with regional or network sports broadcasts starting in time periods normally occupied by the block. These scheduling disruptions did not affect the Qubo block on Ion Television, whose programming schedule consisted largely of syndicated reruns and, like the standalone Qubo Channel, was distributed through a national feed.

=== Spanish audio and subtitles ===
Both versions of the respective closed captioning (CC) bugs used on Qubo at the beginning of each program. The "CC 1&3" bug (seen on the right) was specifically used for programs captioned in both English (CC1) and Spanish (CC3).

For much of its history, the majority of Qubo Channel's programming included a Spanish audio track accessible via the second audio program (SAP) feed, utilizing the same Spanish dubs featured on the companion Qubo en Telemundo block. Following the discontinuation of the Telemundo block on July 1, 2012 in favor of MiTelemundo the following week, the standalone network’s SAP track became the exclusive source for all Spanish dubs of Qubo’s programming.

In addition to SAP audio, some programs on Qubo Channel also featured Spanish closed captioning transmitted via the CC3 caption channel. This included nearly all series shared with the NBC and Telemundo blocks (such as VeggieTales, Jane and the Dragon, Jacob Two-Two, The Zula Patrol, Shelldon and Willa's Wild Life), as well as select SAP-compatible shows exclusive to the standalone network (like Sammy’s Story Shop, Pippi Longstocking, Being Ian and Rescue Heroes). Programs featuring Spanish captions were identified by a special digital on-screen graphic labeled CC 1&3 at the start of each episode, denoting the specified caption channels available for both English (CC1) and Spanish (CC3) subtitles. However, Spanish captioning for certain programs (such as Babar, Rupert and Adventures From the Book of Virtues) was inconsistent and only available for specific episodes.

Qubo Channel's inclusion of CC3 Spanish subtitles distinguished itself from other youth-oriented networks like Disney Channel and Boomerang, which typically only offer the Spanish audio via SAP. This captioning model, also utilized by the companion Qubo blocks on both NBC and Ion Television, was essentially the reverse of Telemundo’s approach, which has utilized the CC3 channel to provide English subtitles for its weeknight prime-time lineup since September 8, 2003 (save for a brief hiatus between October 14, 2008 and March 30, 2009). Mirroring the model established by Telemundo, Qubo Channel retained its Spanish subtitles during most reruns of its programming, a feature that stood in contrast to the strategy later implemented by Univision, which introduced English subtitles on January 30, 2012, but only transmits them during a program's first run on the network.

As stated by Qubo president Rick Rodriguez, these features were intended to serve as bilingual tools to educate English-speaking children on the Spanish language and vice versa.

=== Qubo Night Owl ===
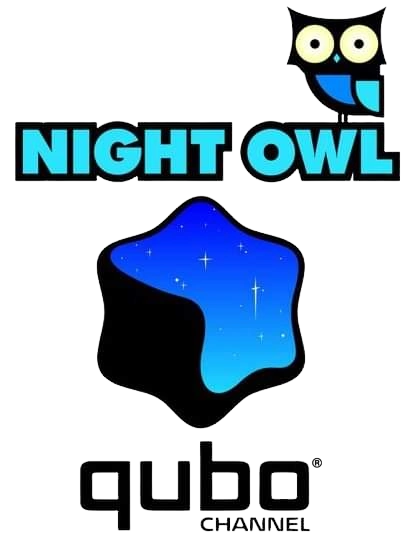
Logo for the Qubo Night Owl block used from September 27, 2010 to January 8, 2019.

On September 27, 2010, Qubo Channel launched "Qubo Night Owl" (running from 12:00 to 6:00 a.m. ET), a late-night block originally featuring classic animated series, many of which came from the Filmation library then owned by Classic Media. The block was initially targeted at both older teenagers and Gen X adults who grew up watching the shows showcased in the 1980s. After Classic Media was acquired by DreamWorks in 2012, the agreement with Qubo for the Filmation library ended in August 2013, leading to the block's restructuring to feature a mixture of animated and live-action series sourced only from the remaining distribution partners.

The restructuring resulted in the block experiencing channel drift for the remainder of its run, incorporating both preschool shows and contemporary programs for older children that were typically broadcast during the daytime lineup as opposed to the undesirable graveyard slot. The block was eventually discontinued on January 8, 2019 as Ion Media decided to reduce the amount of religious and paid programming on both Ion Television and Ion Plus (then known as Ion Life) by shifting those hours to Qubo's overnight schedule between 1:00 to 6:00 a.m. ET, reducing Qubo's main schedule to 19 hours daily from 6:00 to 1:00 a.m. ET. However, the channel returned to its 24-hour schedule for its final week on the air between February 22 to February 28, 2021.

== Affiliates ==
At the time of its closure, Qubo had affiliation agreements with 67 television stations encompassing 34 states and the District of Columbia. The network had an estimated national reach of 58.83% of all households in the United States (or 183,832,858 American families with at least one television set). Like parent network Ion Television, the network's stations almost exclusively consisted of network-owned stations (with the exception of Louisville, Kentucky affiliate WBNA). Qubo's programming was available by default through a national feed that was delivered directly to cable and satellite providers in markets without a local Ion Television station that carried the network.

Qubo did not have any over-the-air stations in several major markets, most notably Toledo, Ohio; San Diego, California; Charlotte, North Carolina; Richmond, Virginia; Green Bay, Wisconsin; and Cincinnati, Ohio, along with limited coverage in Baltimore, which depended on Ion's two Washington, D.C. stations for the network and had no Baltimore station. A key factor in the network's limited national broadcast coverage is the fact that Ion Media Networks did not actively attempt over-the-air distribution for the network on the digital subchannels of other network-affiliated stations (in contrast, its parent network Ion Television, which had similarly limited national coverage following the digital television transition, had begun subchannel-only affiliation arrangements through agreements with NBC Owned Television Stations' Telemundo Station Group subsidiary and Nexstar Media Group during 2014 and 2015), with very few stations that contractually carry the network's programming (with limited exceptions in markets such as Louisville, Kentucky and Anchorage, Alaska). As a result, Ion Media Networks owned most of Qubo's station base.

== See also ==
- Children's Programming on NBC
- Children's Programming on Telemundo
- KidsCo - A former international children’s pay television network that ran from 2007 to 2014, stemming from a separate joint venture that also involved NBCUniversal and Corus Entertainment, while also including DIC Entertainment and Cookie Jar Group.
