= 3-2-1 Penguins! =

American science fiction animated Christian children's television series

- Created by: Jeff Parker; Nathan Carlson; Phil Lollar
- Developed by: Mike Nawrocki; Phil Vischer; Ron Smith; Everett Downing Jr.
- Directed by: Tod Carter; Tom Bancroft; Tim Hodge; Ron Smith
- Voices of: Mark Marten; Melissa Peterson; Annie Walker-Bright; Ron Wells; Greg Mills; Page Hearn; Ron Smith
- Theme music composer: Kurt Heinecke; Mike Nawrocki
- Opening theme: "3-2-1 Penguins! Theme Song" (lyrics by Mike Nawrocki)
- Ending theme: "Fly" (music by Kurt Heinecke)
- Composers: Kurt Heinecke; Adam Frick
- Country of origin: United States
- Original language: English
- No. of seasons: 3
- No. of episodes: 6 (direct-to-video); 21 (TV series); 27 (total)

Production
- Executive producers: Tim Hodge; Terry Pefanis; Phil Vischer
- Producers: Jon Gadsby; J. Chris Wall; Joe Barrouao; Sean Roche; David Pitts; Steven Lynette
- Editor: John Wahba
- Running time: 30 minutes (video); 22 minutes (television)
- Production company: Big Idea Entertainment

Original release
- Network: Direct-to-Video
- Release: November 14, 2000 – July 1, 2003
- Network: Qubo
- Release: October 6, 2007 – November 13, 2008

Related
- VeggieTales; Larryboy: The Cartoon Adventures

3-2-1 Penguins! is an American science fiction animated children's television series, initially launched on November 14, 2000, as a direct-to-video episode by Big Idea Entertainment with videos released between 2000 and 2003. The direct-to-video series held the top spot on the Soundscan kid video sales charts for its first 18 weeks of release, was the #1 seller on Christian Booksellers Association's video list in 2001, and had sold 1.5 million videos as of February 2009.

The television series aired on the Qubo blocks on NBC, Ion Television and Telemundo as well as the Qubo channel, and later on TBN and Smile of A Child. It ran for three seasons, with the first season consisting of television broadcasts of the six original home videos. Following its conclusion in 2008, it continued in reruns until 2014. The series was a top-ranked show on NBC's Qubo Saturday morning kids block in 2008.

== Premise ==
Twin siblings Jason and Michelle are spending the summer with their British grandmother, who they call Grandmum, in Pennsylvania's Poconos region. She has a collection of kitschy ceramic figurines, the most prized of which is four penguins in a rocket ship, a honeymoon gift from her late husband. In the first video, the twins accidentally drop the ship; instead of breaking, it flies into the air and reveals the four penguin figurines are alive and are the crew of the spaceship. One of the twins is then pulled into the ship, using the crew's Galeezle (shrinking) device, and taken on a galactic adventure.

The ensuing adventure ties into the moral dilemma Jason and Michelle had struggled with in the opening scene. For instance in episode Trouble on Planet Wait-Your-Turn, the twins struggle with taking turns playing a new video game and looking through their Granddad's telescope before Jason is transported to a planet of alien vacuums who also have trouble taking turns.

== Cast and characters ==
=== Primary ===
- Zidgel (voiced by Ron Wells (season 1) and John Payne (seasons 2–3)) is the Rockhopper's captain, who resembles both James T. Kirk and Ted Baxter.
- Midgel (voiced by Greg Mills (season 1) and Paul Dobson (seasons 2–3)) is the Rockhopper's engineer and pilot. He sometimes shouts "Bonsai!" and pulls out a bonsai tree to trim a branch before driving the ship.
- Fidgel (voiced by Page H. Hearn (season 1) and Lee Tockar (seasons 2–3)) is the doctor and scientist of the Rockhopper's crew. Many of his inventions are odd, but can also be useful, such as the Galeezle. As shown in photos in the first episode, he physically resembles Grandmum's deceased husband.
- Kevin (voiced by Ron Smith (season 1) and Michael Donovan (seasons 2–3)) Although he does not have a specific job on the ship other than cleaning, he is always ready to help when needed. He also sometimes answers questions or solves problems without realizing.
- Jason T. Conrad (voiced by Mark Marten (season 1) and Quinn Lord (seasons 2–3)) is a seven-year-old boy and Michelle's twin brother, who goes on adventures with the penguins.
- Michelle Frances Conrad (voiced by Melissa Peterson (season 1) and Claire Corlett (seasons 2–3)) is a seven-year-old girl and Jason's twin sister, who also goes on adventures with the penguins and her twin brother. She is five minutes younger than him.
- Grandmum (voiced by Pamela Thomas (2000), Annie Walker-Bright (2001), Kymberly Mellen (2001–2003), and Ellen Kennedy (seasons 2–3)) is Jason and Michelle's British grandmother, who often gives them advice from "The Good Book".

=== Minor ===
- Baron von Cavitus (voiced by Garry Chalk) Originally known as Bert Bertman, he was a classmate of Fidgel when they were students at the academy and is the inventor of the Galeezle. After others made fun of him for being a hamster, he turned very evil and attempted to take over the academy. Some time later, he built himself a robot suit and attempted to take over the whole galaxy.
- Admiral Strap (voiced by Dale Wilson) is the Penguin's commanding officer. Despite seeming very strict and militaristic, he has a soft spot for Michelle. In the original six videos, he is never seen and communicates to the penguins via fax machine. In the series, he interacts via speakerphone with the penguins to give them their missions.
- Sol (voiced by Garry Chalk) is a wise old bartender at the Comet Lounge and a friend of Jason, Michelle, and the penguins, whom he also advises.

== Episodes ==
Season	Episodes	Originally aired		
Season	Episodes	First aired	Last aired	Network
1	6	November 14, 2000	July 1, 2003	Direct-to-video
1	6	September 9, 2006	November 17, 2006	Qubo
Special		December 2, 2006		Qubo
2	13	October 6, 2007	April 12, 2008	Qubo
3	7	October 2, 2008	November 13, 2008	Qubo

=== Season 1 (2000–03) ===
The first season was broadcast on Qubo from September 9, 2006 to December 2, 2006 and consisted of televising the direct-to-video shows that were originally released from November 14, 2000 to July 1, 2003. At the end, each episode, with the exception of the first episode, has the Penguins perform at the Comet Lounge, singing a song related to the moral lesson of the episode.

No. overall	No. in season	Title	Directed by	Written by	Original release date (Direct-to-video)	Qubo air date	Qubo broadcasting order
1	1	"Trouble on Planet Wait-Your-Turn"	Ron Smith	Mike Nawrocki, Phil Vischer, Jeff Parker, Ron Smith, Nathan Carlson and Phil Loller	November 14, 2000	September 9, 2006	S01E01
Michelle and Jason are arguing about taking turns looking out of a telescope. After discovering a toy spaceship, Jason is pulled into the now-flying ship with the penguins, where he learns that he and they are called upon to help an alien planet in danger of burning up in its sun. It turns out that the indigenous people, (who resemble old-fashioned Electrolux canister vacuum cleaners) and even the planet itself, are incapable of waiting their turns.
2	2	"The Cheating Scales of Bullamanka"	Ron Smith	Written by : Mike Nawrocki and Ron Smith; Story by : Phil Vischer	July 20, 2001	September 16, 2006	S01E02
Michelle beats Jason in a game of 'Squid Tac Toad' by cheating. Michelle learns that the penguins are real when she is then taken to the planet of Bullamanka to play against the Lizard King in a LARP version of Squid Tac Toad. After finding out that the Lizard King also wins by cheating, she learns the importance of playing fairly. Music Video: "Fair and Square".
3	3	"The Amazing Carnival of Complaining"	Ron Smith	Written by : Mike Nawrocki, Ron Smith and Tom Owens; Story by : Phil Vischer, Mike Nawrocki and Ron Smith	November 16, 2001	November 17, 2006	S01E06
Jason and the crew go on a leisure trip to a carnival, but are confronted by carnival barker Uncle Blobb and his diabolical interplanetary real estate scheme as he attempts to turn them into "Seeds of Discontent." Its theme is not complaining about the things we don't have. Music Video: "The Shinin' Star Swing".
4	4	"Runaway Pride at Lightstation Kilowatt"	Ron Smith	Written by : Tim Hodge and Ron Smith; Story by : Keith Lango	September 21, 2002	October 21, 2006	S01E04
Michelle joins the Penguins on a mission to restore the signal beacon at Lightstation Kilowatt before the F.S.S Emperor's Pride crashes into a giant cosmic reef. Its theme is overcoming pride. Music Video: "Space Surfin' Superstar".
5	5	"The Doom Funnel Rescue"	Ron Smith	Cydne Clark and Steve Granat	December 21, 2002	October 28, 2006	S01E05
Jason and the penguins, along with Kevin's robot friend, B.I.N.G., are called on to save a peaceful colony in the Doublewide Constellation which is being threatened by a huge space tornado. Its theme is helping others. Music Video: "Spaceship Driving Man".
6	6	"Moon Menace on Planet Tell-a-Lie"	Ron Smith	John Crane and Charles Eston	July 1, 2003	September 23, 2006	S01E03
Jason and the penguins are called on to save the planet of Tell-a-Lie before its giant moon flattens the planet. But with its people telling only lies, figuring out the truth about what is causing their moon to plummet towards the planet isn't easy. Its theme is telling the truth. Music Video: "The Legend of Galaxy Gus". The song is about a village invaded by an outlaw named Hancho Villa and the heroic Galaxy Gus must stop him.

=== Special (2006) ===
No. overall	No. in season	Title	Written by	Original release date	Qubo broadcasting order
7	1	"Songs From Cosmic Cafe"	Cydne Clark and Steve Granat (songs)	December 2, 2006	S01E07
Features three music videos from the remaining three videos which consist of: "The Legend of Galaxy Gus" from "Moon Menace on Planet Tell-A-Lie"; "Spaceship Drivin Man" from "Doom Funnel Rescue"; "Space Surfin' Superstar" from "Runaway Pride at Lightstation Kilowatt"

=== Season 2 (2007–2008) ===
After airing the original videos in Season 1, Big Idea released new stories that were first aired on television for Season 2 and 3.

No. overall	No. in season	Title	Directed by	Written by	Original release date
8	1	"I Scream, You Scream"	Tim Hodge	Kirby Atkins	October 6, 2007
After returning from a mission, the penguins are unable to bring Jason and Michelle back to Grandmum's house as the Galeezel is broken. Until it's fixed the kids have to join the penguins as they battle Cavitus, who's plotting to steal the Space Defreeze ship. Cavitus tries to thwart the penguins by getting them angry at each other and accusing them of things they didn't do. Soon everyone learns the importance of knowing all the facts before jumping to conclusions.
9	2	"The Green-eyed Monster"	Tod Carter	Robert G. Lee	October 20, 2007
The Penguins visit a small planet divided by a picket fence round the equator and populated by two factions of sheep, each of whom wants to conquer the other side. Michelle also has her eyes on Jason's room, which she believes to be bigger than hers. The pervasiveness of Envy causes green-eyed Monsters to appear and eat holes in everything they see. It's only when contentment rules that peace is restored. Note: This episode is included in the DVD compilation Save the Planets.
10	3	"Lazy Daze"	Tim Hodge	Tim Hodge	November 3, 2007
The kids and Penguin Crew decide to take an undeserved break from their work and have a picnic on Rigel-13. Jason only too gladly sets aside his duties for play. By the time they arrive at Rigel-13, Jason is a full-on sluggard. No sooner do they set out their picnic baskets, than they are set upon by giant 20-foot tall ants! Escape seems impossible, but diligence is the way to a rich soul. Note: This episode is included in the DVD compilation Blast in Space.
11	4	"More Is More"	Rob Corley	Broose Johnson	December 1, 2007
The Penguins are sent to Planet Gutt to investigate a problem in their gravitational field. What looks like a simple matter turns out to be an enormous problem. The entire planet has become addicted to the breakfast cereal, Sugar Frosted Black Holes. It causes insatiable appetites for everything. The planet has become lopsided and is in danger of being thrown off course. The Penguins must convince these over-indulgers that moderation is the key, and gluttony only leads to ruin. Note: This episode is included in the DVD compilation Save the Planets.
12	5	"Give and Let Give"	Tod Carter	David Murray	December 15, 2007
Michelle refuses to share cupcakes with her brother, as the crew heads up a mission to a planet of Garden Gnomes and Plastic Flamingos who are feuding over water rights on their drought-stricken world. Michelle sees that stinginess hurts all parties involved, when the dam on the planet is set to burst and destroy everything. Will they overcome their squabbling and share so that everyone has enough? Note: This episode is included in the DVD compilation Save the Planets.
13	6	"Practical Hoax"	Tom Bancroft	Kirby Atkins	January 5, 2008
Jason and Midgel set off a series of practical jokes on board the ship, none of which turn out to be very funny to their victims. Then the crew is asked to act as substitute teachers at the Academy. Jason and Midgel help out and see what it's like to be at the wrong end of a practical joke. Cavitus infiltrates the school in an attempt to defeat the Penguins. Naturally everything comes to a head, and Penguins learn a lesson that a joke isn't funny when it hurts somebody.
14	7	"Comedy of Errors"	Tod Carter	Kirby Atkins	January 19, 2008
Jason takes the stage as a stand-up comedian to take the place of the broken Ventril-o-Matic at the Comet Lounge. Trouble is, he gets his material by making fun of his friends. Michelle is especially heartbroken when he reveals a song she sings to calm herself down when she's feeling scared. Jason comes to a crossroad and has to decide whether to continue this new career path or make amends with his friends.
15	8	"Compassion Crashin'"	Rob Corley	David Murray	February 2, 2008
Michelle is feeling down and lonely. Jason and the Penguin Crew try to cheer her up, but only succeed in making her feel worse because nobody listens to her; they simply try and put on a happy face in front of her gloom. When they crash-land on an asteroid, Michelle is made Queen of the strange tribe that lives there. Will she use her power to force all to listen, or will the crew finally learn the importance of compassion on their own? Note: This episode is included in the DVD compilation Blast in Space.
16	9	"Wiki Tiki"	Tim Hodge	Broose Johnson	February 16, 2008
The Penguins are called to the island planet of Wiki Tiki, which is in danger of being engulfed by a large volcano. But they are in a hurry to get back to the Comet Lounge for Sol's Aurora Borealis Punch! They set to work too quickly without doing enough research. All of their patchwork efforts fail. Will the impatient crew finally realize they need to slow down, or will their haste leave the planet doomed? Note: This episode is included in the DVD compilation Blast in Space.
17	10	"Invasion of the Body Swappers"	Tom Bancroft	Kirby Atkins	March 1, 2008
Michelle is troubled, feeling like she isn't pretty. As she wrestles with her outward appearance, she and Jason join the Penguin crew as they head to the MISO GUAPO beauty products convention where Zidgel is supposed to deliver a speech. Through a bizarre Galeezel accident, Zidgel and Kevin switch bodies, and mayhem ensues.
18	11	"Git Along Little Doggies"	Tod Carter	Robert G. Lee	March 15, 2008
Jason and Michelle help the Penguins crew with a cattle drive on Planet Roo-Tin Toot-Tin. Seems most of the herd has come up missing. But the trail boss, Wild Bill Quasar, is one ornery critter. He has nary a kind word for anybody. The crew learns that a kind word turns away wrath while helping to retrieve Wild Bill's cattle.
19	12	"Wise Guys"	John Wahba	Robert G. Lee	March 29, 2008
Jason gets a time machine. But he doesn't want to listen to the advice from his elders on how to make it work. Because of a glitch, they crash-land on a planet populated by three old Penguins, who just like to dole out unsolicited advice. Then they all realize that Jason's time machine did work, and these old penguins are Midgel, Fidgel and Zidgel in future form. Plus, the old guys (because of their experience) are the only ones who know how to repair the ship and the time machine. It's a lesson in listening to your elders.
20	13	"Hogs and Kisses"	Tom Bancroft	David Murray	April 12, 2008
Jason is feeling put down by everyone. It seems he is being criticized at every turn, so he runs away to be confronted by Cavitus and the Lizard King.

=== Season 3 (2008) ===
No. overall	No. in season	Title	Directed by	Written by	Original release date
21	1	"12 Angry Hens"	Joe Barruso	Mitch Schauer	October 2, 2008
The leader of the chickens tells the Rockhopper that the royal egg has been stolen.
22	2	"Kennel Club Blues"	Tod Carter	Broose Johnson	October 9, 2008
When Michelle finds out that the cato'pillow's name is 79, she asks what kind of name is that for a kitty.
23	3	"Oh, Mercy!"	John Wahba	David Murray	October 16, 2008
Zidgel and Jason deliver a crown jewel to the Gator king of Mercy Falls, but Zidgel accidentally breaks it while opening the box. As a result, he gets thrown in prison. Note: This episode is included in the DVD compilation Escape from Planet Hold-A-Grudge!.
24	4	"Promises, Promises"	Rob Corley	Tim Hodge	October 23, 2008
Fuzzy answers that the crack is weakening the wall and the city of Planet Cross-Your-Heart will be destroyed if it breaks.
25	5	"Do Unto Brothers"	Tod Carter	Meredith Jennings-Offen	October 30, 2008
Zidgel, Midgel, and Fidgel are kidnapped by Cavitus and it's up to Jason, Michelle, Kevin and Sol to free them. Note: This episode is included in the DVD compilation Escape from Planet Hold-A-Grudge!.
26	6	"Between an Asteroid and a Hard Place"	Joe Barruso	Robert G. Lee	November 6, 2008
Michelle realizes she's trapped in an asteroid. Note: This episode is included in the DVD compilation Escape from Planet Hold-A-Grudge!.
27	7	"In the Big House"	Broose Johnson	Broose Johnson	November 13, 2008
After Cavitus steals the cow captain's cookies, it's up to the Penguins, Jason and Michelle to get the cookies and defeat Cavitus and his galaxy.

== Release ==
=== Broadcast ===
After originally being released exclusively on direct-to-home videos, 3-2-1 Penguins first aired on the Qubo blocks on NBC, Ion Television, and Telemundo, as well as on the Qubo channel with the airing of the original videos. This was soon followed with new episodes that premiered on television. The show also aired on TBN and its children's block Smile of a Child on Saturdays until 2018. It also airs on DreamWorks Channel in select countries.

As of July 2020, the entire series was made available to watch for free on Peacock following its launch. And 25 episodes on Yippee since June 2022.

=== Home media ===
The first six videos were released in direct-to-video format from November 14, 2000, to July 1, 2003, prior to airing on Qubo.

The first DVD compilation of the TV series Save the Planets! was released on September 1, 2008, including three episodes from the second season: "The Green-eyed Monster", "More is More" and "Give and Let Give". The second DVD compilation Blast in Space! was released on February 1, 2009, including three episodes from the second season: "Wiki Tiki", "Lazy Daze" and "Compassion Crashin'". The third compilation, Escape from Planet Hold-A-Grudge! was released on October 20, 2009, including three episodes from the third and final season: "Do Unto Brothers", "Oh, Mercy!" and "Between an Asteroid and a Hard Place".

The first video, "Trouble on Planet Wait-Your-Turn", was released as a bonus episode in the two VeggieTales DVD re-issues of Lyle the Kindly Viking Special Edition and Where's God When I'm S-Scared? 15th Anniversary Collector's Edition. The fourth video, "Runaway Pride at Lightstation Kilowatt", was also released in the re-issue of King George and the Ducky Special Edition.

On September 18, 2012, a two-disc complete DVD set contained the first three season-one episodes and the first ten season-two episodes, for a total of 13 episodes.

3-2-1 Penguins! home video releases
Season	Title	Episodes	Release date
1	Trouble on Planet Wait-Your-Turn		November 14, 2000
1	The Cheating Scales of Bullamanka		July 20, 2001
1	The Amazing Carnival of Complaining		November 16, 2001
1	Runaway Pride at Lightstation Kilowatt		September 21, 2002
1	The Doom Funnel Rescue		December 21, 2002
1	Moon Menace on Planet Tell-a-Lie		July 1, 2003
2	Save the Planets	3 ("The Green-eyed Monster" • "More Is More" • "Give and Let Give")	September 1, 2008
2	Blast in Space	3 ("Lazy Daze" • "Compassion Crashin'" • "Wiki Tiki")	February 1, 2009
3	Escape from Planet Hold-A-Grudge!	3 ("Oh, Mercy!" • "Do Unto Brothers" • "Between an Asteroid and a Hard Place")	October 20, 2009
Complete series box set		26	August 8, 2016

== Reception ==
KJ Dell Antonia of Common Sense Media gave 3 out of 5 stars; writing "That said, 3-2-1 Penguins is hardly subtle in the way it delivers a lesson at the end of each episode." adding that the "series carries clear moral messages and comes from a Christian perspective (the main characters say their bedtime prayers at the end of each episode). The messages themselves -- such as the virtue of patience -- are hard to argue with no matter what your religious bent."

== Possible revival ==
In 2019, Phil Vischer suggested that there had been early discussions about a potential revival of the series, though no further updates have been reported since.
