= Turbo Dogs =

- Genre: Children's television series Sports
- Created by: Scholastic Corporation (characters)
- Directed by: Denny Silverthorne
- Voices of: Stacey DePass; Joris Jarsky; Dan Petronijevic; Lyon Smith; Hadley Kay; Peter Cugno
- Opening theme: "Let's Go, Turbo Dogs!" performed by Trust
- Ending theme: "Let's Go, Turbo Dogs!" (instrumental)
- Composers: Brian Pickett; David Kelly; James Chapple; Graeme Cornies
- Countries of origin: Canada; United States
- Original language: English
- No. of seasons: 1
- No. of episodes: 26

Production
- Executive producers: Arnie Zipursky; Trevor Yaxley; Deborah Forte; Jef Kaminsky
- Producers: Kristine Klohk; Rodney MacDonald
- Running time: 22 minutes
- Production companies: CCI Entertainment; Scholastic Corporation

Original release
- Network: Kids' CBC (Canada); Qubo (United States)
- Release: October 3, 2008 – May 7, 2011

Turbo Dogs is an animated television series based on the book Racer Dogs by Bob Kolar. The series is produced by CCI Entertainment and Scholastic Corporation. The show premiered in the United States on Qubo on October 3, 2008 and ended on May 7, 2011.

== Premise ==
Canine friends Dash, Mags, Strut, Stinkbert, Clutch, and GT learn lessons in friendship, fair play, and teamwork as they pull together to protect their reputations as the fastest dogs in Racerville in the animated series adapted from Bob Kolar's book.

== Characters ==
The characters of Turbo Dogs (From left to right): Strut, Mags, Dash, Clutch, Stinkbert, and GT.

- Dash (voiced by Lyon Smith) is a selfless, thoughtful beagle with a heart of a gold and a healthy spirit of competition. Dash is the leader of the Turbo Dogs who always plays fair. His colors are red and white and his player number is 1 which is colored blue. His gloves have the same color as his number. He does try hard, but he can be hard on himself sometimes. He is also very tidy and neat. In one episode, it was shown that Dash also has a large collection of racing memorabilia and model cars. Dash may have a crush on Mags.
- Mags (voiced by Stacey DePass) is an American Cocker Spaniel, and the only female Turbo Dog. Never bossy or overbearing, she is one tough girl who isn't afraid to speak her mind. She is responsible and cheerful, and often tends to be the voice of reason when things go awry. She also owns a pet hamster named Lulu. Her colors are purple and orange, her player number is 2. When her helmet is off, she's revealed to have bangs and purple hairbands.
- GT (voiced by Dan Petronijevic) is a bulldog that is a natural born inventor and mechanic. His colors are blue and white and his player number is 3. It is said that GT can fix just about any car, and "could probably make an engine out of a leash and some empty dog food cans".
- Strut (voiced by Joris Jarsky) is a dachshund who is his own worst enemy. Strut makes up for his small size by making big plans, that sometimes backfire. He wants to win so badly that he'll break the rules and take shortcuts to make it happen. His colors are blue and yellow and his player number is 5. His car has six tires unlike all the other cars. He is the only one of the Turbo Dogs who regularly uses his car's special apparatus to give him an unfair advantage during the races, however it usually ends up with him spinning out or crashing. If there's a way to get what he wants without working for it, you can be sure he'll try it.
- Stinkbert (voiced by Hadley Kay) is a terrier with a strong odor who likes garbage. His colors are chartreuse and goldenrod and his player number is 6. He is a Lakeland Terrier. He is shown to have a cheerful and relaxed personality. One of his talents is cooking.
- Clutch (voiced by Peter Cugno) is a Turbo Dog who is just a bit of a klutz. He is a Bernese Mountain Dog. While all the dogs like him, he's closest to Strut and Stinkbert than he is to Dash, Mags, or GT. As a result, he often gets mixed up in Strut's dastardly plans. His colors are green and yellow and his player number is 7.
- Cam (voiced by Terry McGurrin) is a Beagle who is the announcer for every race. He is usually seen on the large display screen on the side of his personal airship that he flies above the racetrack during races.
- Ump (voiced by Ron Pardo) is a German Shepherd. Ump is Racerville Raceway's track official. He is also the flagman for every race, and enforces the track rules.
- Five (voiced by Joseph Motiki) is a pizza delivery dog who is in charge in the Dog-Gone Pizzeria. Five is usually seen travelling on his pizza-delivery scooter. He got his name from his "five minutes or less" delivery policy.
- The Chicken is a chicken who attempts to cross the road/track in every episode, and is usually costumed according to the theme of that particular segment. However, no matter how carefully he looks both ways, he is always narrowly missed by whoever is driving by (such as the Turbo Dogs) and sent spinning to the other side of the road, dizzy, but unharmed.
- Marlene (voiced by Shakura S'Aida) is a spaniel who runs "Marlene's", the shop where the Turbo Dogs get their racing helmets and suits.
- Officer Sarge Gruffer (voiced by Ron Rubin) is a retriever who is a member of the local highway patrol. When the Turbo Dogs got lost in the fog during a race through the countryside, his laugh was able to guide them home.
- Zanner Howler (voiced by Peter Cugno) is a young dog who is one half of "the Howler Brothers", and is Dash's biggest fan. He wears a large, gold dog tag around his neck, blue pants, belt, and brown sandals. He likes playing golf, watching TV with his friend Dash, eating snacks, and hanging out with his best friend Fanner. Zanner is from Kyrgyzstan, Kazakhstan, Australia, and Ukraine.
- Fanner Howler (voiced by Terry McGurrin) is a small terrier who, along with Zanner, is the other half of "the Howler Brothers". He wears racing gloves and sometimes a cape to emulate his idols, the Turbo Dogs.
- Rock Rally (voiced by Dwayne Hill) is a German Shepherd and Dash's idol. Rock is actually a movie-star who makes racing movies. Upon visiting the Turbo Dogs home track to make a new film, Dash is pressed into service to double for him in the driving scenes. Dash soon discovers that the reason for this is driving makes Rock "very nervous", and he doesn't do his own driving in his films.
- Auntie Ratchet (voiced by Catherine Disher) is Dash's aunt. A bright, extremely cheerful little dog who lives in the country, Auntie Ratchet is an inventor and former racer with a surprising number of skills, which she demonstrates.
- Wrenchini (voiced by Bill Colgatte) is the local master mechanic and garage owner, who is idolized by GT, who obtains parts and occasionally works on or modifies the Turbo Dogs racing cars. He speaks with a German accent.
- Pit-Crew Dogs are a crew of small Schnauzer-type dogs who do the tire changing, fueling, and other pit work on the Turbo Dogs racing cars.
- The Alstatian Aces are a sister trio of Cairn Terriers with human hair and eyeglasses. Their names starts with "A".

== Episodes ==
No.	Title	Original release date	Prod. code
1	"Lucky Charm" "Speak Up"	October 3, 2008	101
"Lucky Charm": GT believes that a statue he inherited from his grandfather is a lucky charm, and loses his confidence when the trinket is stolen by Strut and Stinkbert. "Speak Up": Dash, who is terrified of public speaking, is chosen to call the play-by-play for an upcoming race.
2	"Stink Positive" "Mixed Message"	October 10, 2008	102
"Stink Positive": Stinkbert ruins a surprise party when his pungent odor makes his friends exit prematurely, but after he tries to keep clean for their sakes, his friends notice that he isn't exactly happy with it. "Mixed Message": Strut moves in with Dash after destroying his own house. Unfortunately for Dash, this makes him run late for picking up a replacement helmet.
3	"Strut's Trick" "A Star Turn"	October 17, 2008	103
"Strut's Trick": When the Turbo Dogs do what they can to help Strut recuperate from a broken foot, he milks the situation for all it is worth. "A Star Turn": Clutch has a great day at the track, drawing admiration from all sides.
4	"The Cook-Off" "Strut Delivers"	October 24, 2008	104
"The Cook-Off": The Turbo Dogs are enthusiastic when Cam announces a cooking competition. Stinkbert, however, is finding trouble making a dish that others will eat. "Strut Delivers": The Turbo Dogs all pitch in to plan a party for the unveiling of a statue of Racerville's founder, but a procrastinating Strut threatens to derail plans.
5	"Crotchet Surprise" "Star Attraction"	October 31, 2008	105
"Crotchet Surprise": Dash is off to visit his Auntie Ratchet in the countryside, and discovers she is much more fun than anticipated. "Star Attraction": Everyone in Racerville is excited when movie star Rock Rally comes to town. Dash, however, discovers a secret of his.
6	"Marshall Dash" "Dogs in a Fog"	December 5, 2008	106
"Marshall Dash": Dash wins the title of marshal at the race track, but starts to implement rules at the clubhouse that begin to repel his friends. "Dogs in a Fog": Fog envelops the Cross Country Rally, while Officer Gruffer tries to deal with his own laugh.
7	"Five Minutes Flat" "Wrenchini's Wrench"	December 12, 2008	107
"Five Minutes Flat": Strut gets a job at the Dog Gone Pizzeria to prove that five is no better than a Turbo Dog. "Wrenchini's Wrench": GT learns how hurtful and unfair it is to accuse people wrongly when he blames others for stealing a wrench.
8	"Relay Racers" "Bowled Over"	December 19, 2008	108
"Relay Racers": The Turbo Dogs are paired up for the big relay, but when Mags tries to make Stinkbert race like her, she realizes that she forgot the main basics on teamwork. "Bowled Over": GT discovers that he has a passion and talent for bowling, but as he hounds Mags into joining a bowling team, he learns that it is best not to make someone do more than what they wanted.
9	"Race for Treasure" "Everyone's a Winner"	December 26, 2008	109
"Race for Treasure": Stinkbert finds one-half of a map. GT finds the other half. The race is on to be the first to find the treasure. "Everyone's a Winner": Stinkbert is discouraged after a few near-wins, and decides to quit racing. As the others notice, however, he has yet to fully expunge the racer life from his heart.
10	"What a Lulu!" "Can't Do It All"	March 6, 2009	110
"What a Lulu!": Dash learns that he must take responsibility – for his promises and his friendships. "Can't Do It All": When Mags gets overwhelmed while planning a party, she realizes that she DOES need help and all the Turbo Dogs pitch in.
11	"Pinata Party" "What a Card"	March 14, 2009	111
"Pinata Party": Mags throws a party at the clubhouse and gets a specially-made pinata, which Strut fills with water balloons when he feels like he wasn't invited. "What a Card": Strut and Dash race for Stinkbert's rare and collectible racing card, and Strut employs several cheats to try and win.

== Reception ==
Turbo Dogs has won the 2009 US iParenting Media Award for Best Product in the television category.

The Globe and Mail, Canada's national newspaper, says this about Turbo Dogs:

"This new cartoon takes the creativity ingenuity of the movie CARS and uses dogs instead. For many kids, the combination couldn't be better. Turbo Dogs is a glossy, computer animated toon based on the book Racer Dogs, by Bob Kolar. The series is full of verve, humor and parent-friendly messages about helping your friends and being a good sport. Turbo Dogs ends with its fourth season sometime in 2014."

The Hollywood Reporter writes:

"Bottom Line: Going to the dogs is a good thing in this charming new animated series. The best thing about Turbo Dogs is its flawless animation, and the dogs all are charming in a loopy kind of way. It's all stuff kids will love, and the education they might get - how to behave in the world and find what's important - is an extra added canine attraction."
