= Nico (TV series) =

- Genre: Animated
- Country of origin: Spain
- Original language: Spanish
- No. of series: 1
- No. of episodes: 26

Production
- Running time: 26-30 minutes
- Production companies: BRB Internacional; Televisión Española; ONCE

Original release
- Network: Televisión Española
- Release: 22 March – 10 May 2001

Nico (known as Nicholas in most non-Spanish-speaking countries) is a 2001 Spanish animated television series produced by BRB Internacional, Televisión Española and the National Organization of the Spanish Blind. The title character, Nico, is a boy that is blind. Blind people in the cartoon are usually referred to as "visually impaired" (invidente) regardless of how severe, or otherwise, their blindness is.

The series raised awareness of progresses being made in cities as they became more blind-friendly and also educated children about blind people.

== Characters ==
Nico is initially introduced as moving to a new school, where the rest of the main characters, his classmates, are introduced. In the first episode, he states that he progressively lost his sight, and was therefore integrated into a school for visually impaired people for the last few years. This is later retconned to him being blind from birth: this was expressed explicitly in one episode, where a supermodel tells him that she recently lost her sight and that it was best if he could see once, instead of never having seen like he did. He is voiced by Vincent Canales in the English dub.

Other characters include:

- Tom is Nico's guide dog who every now-and-then makes side-comments to the audience. He is voiced by Johnny Yong Bosch in the English dub.
- Patty is Nico's neighbor, classmate, and best friend. She always ties her blonde hair in a pony tail.
- Oscar is a classmate that perpetually chews bubble gum, who always tried to trick Nico or Tom into tripping or getting into trouble. He feels that Nico is stealing his popularity. He is voiced by Jason Griffith in the English dub.
- Flappy (so named because he wiggles his ears too much) is Oscar's dim-witted and good-hearted, yet only, henchman. He is a bit egocentrical, believes he has psychokinetic powers, and has a short stature. He is voiced by Muhammed Cunningham in the English dub.
- Aisha is Nico's classmate of African descent who perpetually is trying to invent something and seems to be allergic to Flappy.
- Tábata/Tabitha is Nico's baby sister. She is voiced by Vibe Jones in the English dub.
- Boris is Nico's family's ever-hungry pet chameleon, who more than changing color, changes his shape. Boris is always seen chasing a bug. He is voiced by Dan Green in the English dub.
- Charlie is Nico's classmate of Japanese descent. He loves small creatures in general and carries a different insect or rodent around in his pocket in each episode hoping to care for it, much to the dislike of the creature in question. The creature always ends up escaping near the end of the episode, usually after interacting with Boris or Tom.
- Caifás is Nico's elderly, ill-humored, and rich neighbor. He hates children in general, but he hates blind ones even more so. On one occasion, for example, he built a robotic bat for the sole purpose of bothering Nico.
- Nico's teachers
  - Victoria: Nico's homeroom teacher.
  - Chef Purée: the cook at Nico's school, he has a heavy French accent.
  - Max: Nico's clumsy gym teacher.

Minor characters:

- Kiko: a partially sighted boy with retinitis pigmentosa.
- Lucy: a female dog, she appeared in episode 2. She is voiced by Evelyn Lanto in the English dub.
- Thunder: a black-colored dog who is mean towards Tom. He is voiced by Michael Sinterniklaas in the English dub.
- Termix: a gold-colored dog who speaks in a Southern accent. He appeared in episode 2. He is also voiced by Michael Sinterniklaas in the English dub.

== Episodes ==
- Episode 1 - The New Kid has Arrived
- Episode 2 - The Test
- Episode 3 - The Asphalt Jungle
- Episode 4 - Your Voice Sounds Familiar
- Episode 5 - Six Dots to Move the World
- Episode 6 - In the Mist
- Episode 7 - Hearts of Gold
- Episode 8 - With Permission
- Episode 9 - Orange at three o'clock
- Episode 10 - The Fountain of Perception
- Episode 11 - White Christmas
- Episode 12 - Do Touch, Please
- Episode 13 - Things I Once Saw
- Episode 14 - Binary Sensations
- Episode 15 - Pirates
- Episode 16 - Blind Date
- Episode 17 - The Ghost Story
- Episode 18 - A Flea-bitten Dog
- Episode 19 - Tomorrow When it Dawns
- Episode 20 - Team Tactics
- Episode 21 - Nice Sense of Smell, Mate
- Episode 22 - You Don't See Me, You Don't Hear Me
- Episode 23 - Historical Guides
- Episode 24 - The Age of Discoveries
- Episode 25 - A Wonderful Cast
- Episode 26 - A Future for All of Us

== Episode structure ==
The episodes usually showed a modern city, but frequently featured improbable plots (one episode, for example, included a time machine that took a handful of characters to the past). Usually, there was a background story involving the animal characters Tom and/or Boris.

Many episodes happening in a believable scenario featured a reduction in visibility (e.g. smoke from a building on fire) where Nico would save the day by quickly telling people how to "see" without using their eyes, enabling them to, in the above case, escape the building before the fire spread.

=== Closure ===
Each episode closed with a "Watch Out!" (¡Cuidado!) segment narrated by Tom. It consisted of stating a little-known fact of what blind people can now do. Each segment typically started out with something along the lines of "You think someone that is visually impaired can't go skiing?" and then proceeded to explain, in the given example, that blind people can ski if a guide skis in front of them with a speaker on his/her backpack to shout warnings at the skier, and the blind person following the sound of his/her guide's skis sliding on the snow. The example would then be followed by some sort of more or less comical note, to which Tom winked at the audience. In the above case, Tom commented that crossing the path between a blind skier's guide and the blind skier can lead to accidents, while the accident depicted on screen isn't particularly that of the blind skier, but of the person who got in the way. Often, these "Watch Out!" notes were a show of a much later episode.

Immediately afterwards, Nico's voice would give an advance of what the next episode would be about, while brief images of that episode appeared on screen.

During the credits, a comical sequence where Boris chased a dragonfly was shown.

== See also ==
- Blindness and education
- Blindness in literature
- BRB Internacional
- ONCE
