= Juana la Iguana =

- Juana la Iguana character
- First appearance: 1996
- Created by: Tania Gilinski, Amanda Quijano, Anita Katz
- Voiced by: Florencia Grillet, Giset Blanco

In-universe information
- Gender: Female

Juana la Iguana is a fictional character, originally from the Spanish-language children's television series of the same name, which debuted in 1996 on home video. The Juana la Iguana TV show later aired on the following networks: Venevisión (Venezuela), Telemicro (Dominican Republic), Televicentro (Puerto Rico), Televisa (Mexico), Televicentro (Honduras) Canal 5, Telemundo (US), Ecuavisa (Ecuador), Red Uno de Bolivia, and Canal 13 (Colombia).

== Origin and development ==
The original concept for Juana la Iguana was created in the 1990s by Colombian creator Tania Gilinski-Seidl. Living in Venezuela, Gilinski-Seidl then brought together her partners Amanda Quijano and Anita Katz and formed Juana Producciones to create a series of home videos for the Venezuelan market. After gaining wide distribution for the original videos in Venezuela, Iguana Producciones would go on to produce the TV series.

== The new Juana la Iguana ==
In 2015, it was announced that Juana la Iguana would be coming back as an animated character in new mobile applications for children. The first such game has been well received in many countries.
