= Fahrenheit 9/11 controversies =

2004 documentary film controversies

The 2004 documentary film Fahrenheit 9/11 generated controversy before, during, and after its release a few months prior to the 2004 U.S. presidential election. The film, directed by Michael Moore, criticizes the Bush administration's attempt to pursue Osama bin Laden in the aftermath of the September 11 attacks, as well as the Iraq War. Although Fahrenheit 9/11 was generally praised by film critics and won various awards including that year's Palme d'Or, the content was criticized by several commentators for accuracy, and lack of context. Additionally, the distributors protested Moore's inaction on unauthorized copying.

== Controversy over the film's content ==
Shailagh Murray described Fahrenheit 9/11 in The Wall Street Journal as a "harshly satirical and controversial portrait of the Bush presidency." Stephen Dalton of The Times wrote that the movie "hits enough of its satirical targets to qualify as an important and timely film." Desson Thomson says "there is more to Fahrenheit 9/11 than partisan ridicule. ... What's remarkable here isn't Moore's political animosity or ticklish wit. It's the well-argued, heartfelt power of his persuasion." Author and blogger Andrew Sullivan expressed the opposite view, writing that Moore's film is "deeply corrosive of the possibility of real debate and reason in our culture." Canadian journalist Linda McQuaig wrote in response to Sullivan: "Hell, the media shut down real debate long ago. It is precisely because the debate has been so thoroughly corroded by the mainstream media ... that Moore's film is being so gratefully received by so many." Denis Hamill considers Fahrenheit 9/11 to be a "corrective to the daily drumbeat of right-wing talk radio.

English-American journalist and literary critic Christopher Hitchens and Democratic politician Ed Koch contended that Fahrenheit 9/11 contains distortions and untruths and is propaganda. Hitchens also compared Michael Moore to Leni Riefenstahl in his critique for Slate magazine, saying, "Here we glimpse a possible fusion between the turgid routines of MoveOn.org and the filmic standards, if not exactly the filmic skills, of Sergei Eisenstein or Leni Riefenstahl." He later labeled Moore "a completely promiscuous opportunist [and] extremely callous person."

Author and political commentator Peter Holding called Hitchens' analogy "hysterical, unfair and offensive," adding that "some of the criticism directed towards Moore's film displays the very same characteristics for which Moore's film has been criticised". Fellow Slate columnist and Iraq war critic David Edelstein, though generally supportive of the film, wrote Fahrenheit 9/11 "is an act of counterpropaganda that has a boorish, bullying force", but called it a "legitimate abuse of power." Prominent French intellectual Bernard-Henri Lévy agreed the war was "a bad idea", but was sympathetic to the neoconservative point of view and disagreed with what he perceived to be the film's "core" argument, that "we have no reason to be interfering" in the Middle East. Joe Scarborough alleged that Moore has ducked criticism and dodged interviews from both him and Hitchens.

Moore has published both a list of facts and sources for Fahrenheit 9/11 and a document establishing agreements between the points made in his film and the findings of the 9/11 Commission, an independent, bipartisan panel charged by Congress and U.S. President George W. Bush with investigating the facts and circumstances surrounding the September 11 attacks.

=== Bush reading to school children ===
Early on in the film, Moore explains that Bush continued reading "The Pet Goat" with a classroom of second graders at Emma E. Booker Elementary School in Sarasota, Florida for an extended period of time after being told of the attacks.

The school's principal, Gwendolyn Tose-Rigell, explained, "I don't think anyone could have handled it better. What would it have served if he had jumped out of his chair and ran out of the room?" Some of the schoolchildren, now grown, have expressed similar views; Mariah Williams, one of the students, stated in 2011 that, "I'm just glad he didn't get up and leave because then I would have been more scared and confused."

A 9/11 Commission staff report, titled Improvising a Homeland Defense, said: "The President felt he should project strength and calm until he could better understand what was happening."

According to senior White House correspondent Bill Sammon and his inside look at the Bush administration's response to 9/11, Fighting Back: The War on Terrorism from Inside the White House, Press Secretary Ari Fleischer was holding up a legal pad upon which he had written a message telling Bush not to say anything yet.

=== Alleged discrepancy on bin Laden's presumed innocence ===
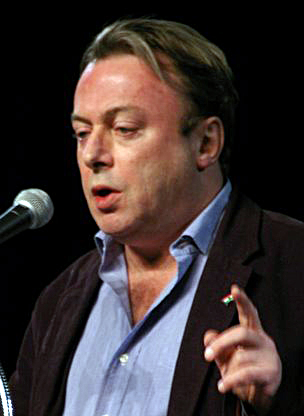
Christopher Hitchens

According to Christopher Hitchens, Moore had argued in a previous public debate that Osama bin Laden was to be presumed innocent until proven guilty, and thus questions the treatment of bin Laden in the film. "Something – I cannot guess what, since we knew as much then as we do now – has since apparently persuaded Moore that Osama Bin Laden is as guilty as hell. Indeed, Osama is suddenly so guilty and so all-powerful that any other discussion of any other topic is a dangerous 'distraction' from the fight against him. I believe that I understand the convenience of this late conversion." Hitchens was subsequently invited to appear on Joe Scarborough's MSNBC talk show, Scarborough Country, at which point a tape recording of his debate with Moore at the Telluride Film Festival in 2002 was replayed.

Moore: It seems as if he and his group were the ones who did this, then they should be tracked down, captured, and brought to justice.

Hitchens: What is the "if" doing in that last sentence of yours?
Moore: Well, all people are innocent until proven guilty in this country. ... Even the worst piece of scum.
Hitchens: I feel I have to press you on that. You regard it as an open question, the responsibility of Osama bin Laden?
Moore: Until anyone is convicted of any crime, no matter how horrific the crime, they are innocent until proven guilty. And as Americans...
Hitchens: No, that's all I asked you.
Moore: Never leave that position.

Hitchens: I'm sorry. So bin Laden's claims of responsibility strike you as the ravings of a clown's, say?

When the video ended, Hitchens proceeded to explain: "Why does someone who thought that Osama was innocent and Afghanistan was no problem suddenly switch in this way? Because unless he says that he was dead wrong all along and Osama Laden was innocent and wronged, he can't say that everything else is a distraction from the hunt for Osama." Host Joe Scarborough, a personal friend of Hitchens, agreed with Hitchens and criticised Moore for inconsistency, accusing him of "hypocrisy" for assuming bin Laden is innocent one minute "and yet, in this movie, at the very beginning, he criticizes George Bush for not assuming the bin Laden family is somehow guilty, then letting them out of the country."

Flak magazine editor Stephen Himes, after watching Scarborough Country and reviewing a transcript of the Telluride debate, wrote that Hitchens had misconstrued Moore's remarks: "Hitchens actually performs some Clintonian semantic gymnastics here. Moore's if is not intending 'I think Osama is innocent and the Afghan war is unjustified;' he's trying to make an argument for American due process: 'If he and his group were the ones who did this, then they should be tracked down, captured and brought to justice'." Film critic Christopher Parry also took issue with Hitchens' interpretation of Moore's remarks, writing "If you've got to build a case against Jeffrey Dahmer, you've got to build a case against Bin Laden."

Allow me to explain Moore's motivation, as if it needed explaining to anyone with a concept of logic, law and due process. Bin Laden is innocent until proven guilty in the eyes of the law. That is the American Way. Indeed, it's the World Way. But in order to prove his guilt, one must build a case, capture him and put him to trial... But in Fahrenheit 9/11, Moore has a different point to make. What he's saying in Fahrenheit 9/11 is, why, exactly, when the pursuit of Osama Bin Laden is completely justified, have only 14,000 troops been sent after him, while ten times that number have been sent into Iraq to take over a country that had nothing to do with 9/11?

CNN news anchor Daryn Kagan asked Moore why, if he is so willing to uphold the law, he could also be critical of the Bush administration for pursuing Osama bin Laden at the same time. Moore replied:

Because if you have a suspect and the suspect gets away, the police, or our military, have a right to go after and get that suspect. In fact, they should go get the suspect. And Richard Clarke's point, and my point is, is that they make a half-hearted effort ... because they didn't want to divert resources from what their main goal was, which was to go in and invade Iraq. And that's what they've been about since Day 1.

=== Saudi flights ===
Moore implicates the White House in allowing relatives of Osama bin Laden to leave the United States without being interviewed at length by the FBI. In his narration in the movie, Moore states that "At least six private jets and nearly two dozen commercial planes carried the Saudis and the Bin Ladens out of the U.S. after September 13." Moore based this statement on the research of Craig Unger, author of House of Bush, House of Saud, whom he interviewed for the film. Passenger lists can be found at the House of Bush website.

==== Approval of the flights ====
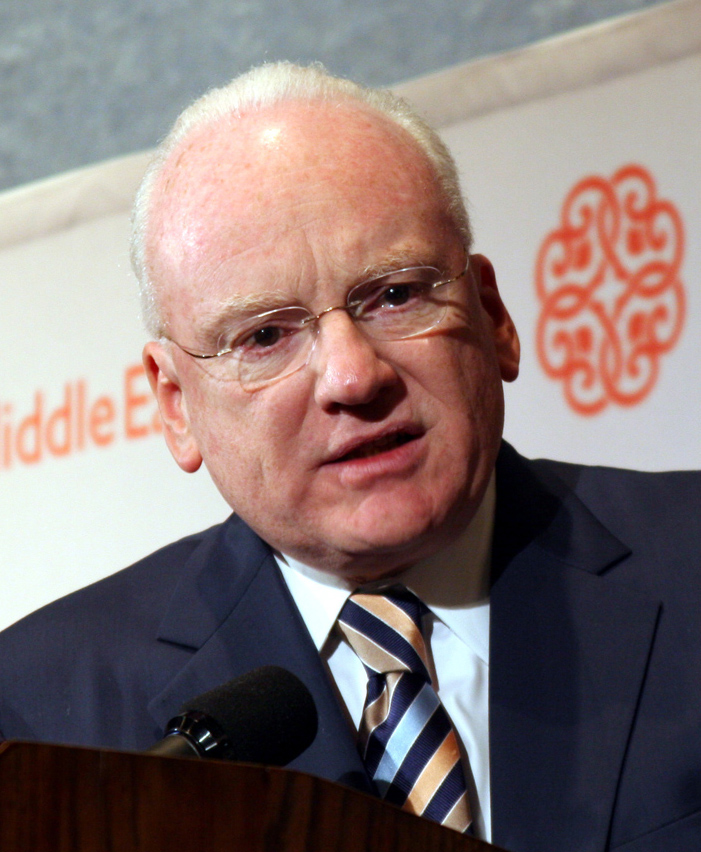
Richard A. Clarke

Christopher Hitchens points to a statement by former counterterrorism chief Richard A. Clarke, when interviewed by The Hill newspaper in May 2004, in which "he, and he alone, took the responsibility for authorizing [the] Saudi departures." Hitchens says that Moore interviewed Clarke and "either he didn't ask Clarke, who authorized those flights, or Clarke told him it was me and only me, and he didn't think it was good enough to use. ... Either way, that's below the level of trash TV, trash journalism." After quitting his White House position, Clarke became a prominent critic of the Bush administration's war on terrorism. Hitchens contends that the film does not mention Clarke's remarks so that it can criticize Bush for not going after Bin Laden's family, while holding up Clarke as a heroic, anti-war figure.

The filmmaker defended himself in an interview with ABC News correspondent Jake Tapper, answering: "Actually I do [display the] article and it's blown up 40 foot on the screen, you can see Richard Clarke's name right there saying that he approved the flights based on the information the FBI gave him. It's right there, right up on the screen. I don't agree with Clarke on this point. Just because I think he's good on a lot of things doesn't mean I agree with him on everything."

Moore, on his website and in The Official Fahrenheit 9/11 Reader, points to additional statements by Richard Clarke, also published in The Hill, which he believes support his contention that the White House approved the flights. The following is a chronological summary:

- September 3, 2003: In his testimony before the Senate Judiciary Committee's Subcommittee on Terrorism, Clarke said: "It is true that members of the bin Laden family were among those who left. We knew that at the time. I can't say much more in open session, but it was a conscious decision with complete review at the highest levels of the State Department and the FBI and the White House."
- March 24, 2004: In testimony to the 9/11 Commission, Clarke indicated that the request was not abnormal, "The Saudi embassy, therefore, asked for these people to be evacuated; the same sort of thing that we do all the time in similar crises, evacuating Americans. The request came to me and I refused to approve it." He goes on to explain that the FBI eventually approved the flights and he describes conversations in which the FBI has said that there was no one who left on those flights who the FBI now wants to interview.
- March 24, 2004: "I would love to be able to tell you who did it, who brought this proposal to me, but I don't know. The two – since you press me, the two possibilities that are most likely are either the Department of State or the White House Chief of Staff's Office. But I don't know."
- May 25, 2004: In an interview with The Hill newspaper, published the following day, Clarke said: "I take responsibility for it. I don't think it was a mistake, and I'd do it again." He went on to say that "It didn't get any higher than me... On 9–11, 9–12 and 9–13, many things didn't get any higher than me. I decided it in consultation with the FBI."

==== The FBI's denial that it had a role in approving the flights ====
On May 18, 2004, The Hill quoted FBI spokesman on counterterrorism John Iannarelli as denying that the FBI had any "role in facilitating these flights one way or another." The FBI's denial of involvement was repeated to The Hill by another spokesperson, Donna Spiser, in a May 26, 2004 article. She is quoted as saying "We haven't had anything to do with arranging and clearing the flights." She states that the FBI's involvement was limited to interviewing those people on the flight it thought were of interest: "We did know who was on the flights and interviewed anyone we thought we needed to."

==== Alleged lack of cooperation from the White House ====
The May 18 article in The Hill, which was published prior to Clarke's May 25 claim of responsibility, quoted 9/11 Commission vice-chair Lee H. Hamilton as saying: "We don't know who authorized [the flights]. We've asked that question 50 times." A May 26 article in The Hill quoted another commission member, Tim Roemer, as being unconvinced by Clarke's claim of sole responsibility for approving the flights: "It doesn't seem that Richard Clarke had enough information to clear it... I just don't think that the questions are resolved, and we need to dig deeper... Clarke sure didn't seem to say that he was the final decisionmaker. I believe we need to continue to look for some more answers."

Allegations concerning the Bush administration's refusal to provide information to the 9/11 Commission about the Saudi flights are disputed. The May 18, 2004 article in The Hill says that commission vice-chairman Lee Hamilton "disclosed the administration's refusal to answer questions on the sensitive subject during a recent closed-door meeting with a group of Democratic senators, according to several Democratic sources." It also says that Republican commission member John Lehman "said... that he told the senators the White House has been fully cooperative." President Bush, who met privately with the Saudi Arabian ambassador on the morning of Sept. 13, 2001, is suspected of personally authorizing the controversial flights while all other air travel had been halted.

==== Interviewing of bin Laden relatives ====
Moore interviews author Craig Unger and retired FBI agent Jack Cloonan, both of whom say bin Laden family members were not questioned in a serious manner at length before being allowed to leave. The 9/11 Commission has found that 22 of the 26 people on the "bin Laden" flight were interviewed before being allowed to leave the country with many being asked "detailed questions". A September 2, 2004 CNN news article reported that "However, in a recent interview with the AP, bin Laden's estranged sister-in-law said she does not believe that family members have cut [Osama] off entirely. Carmen Binladin, who has changed the spelling of her name and lives in Switzerland, said bin Laden is not the only religious brother in the family, and she expects his sisters to support him as well. 'They are very close to Osama,' she said."

==== Declassified FBI documents ====
In June 2007, Judicial Watch published partially declassified FBI documents on the flights obtained under a Freedom of Information Act request. Eric Lichtblau, writing in The New York Times, said the heavily redacted documents "do not appear to contradict directly any of those central findings [of the Sept. 11 commission] but they raise some new questions about the episode." In several cases, "Saudi travelers were not interviewed before departing the country, and F.B.I. officials sought to determine how what seemed to be lapses had occurred." Judicial Watch President Tom Fitton said: "The documents contain numerous errors and inconsistencies which prove the FBI conducted a slapdash investigation of the Saudi flights."

=== War in Iraq ===
The film suggests that the 2003 invasion of Iraq was an illegitimate attack on a sovereign nation, an unnecessary attack against an exaggerated threat. It makes a case against components of the Bush Doctrine; specifically, against the concepts of pre-emptive war combined with American unilateralism. The film also contends that the focus of the United States should have been directed elsewhere.

Christopher Hitchens criticized the film for not mentioning the history of repression, aggression, war crimes and the general state of human rights in Saddam Hussein's Iraq, nor Iraq's noncompliance with numerous United Nations resolutions. Hitchens wrote, "in this peaceable kingdom, according to Moore's flabbergasting choice of film shots, children are flying little kites, shoppers are smiling in the sunshine, and the gentle rhythms of life are undisturbed. Then—wham! From the night sky come the terror weapons of American imperialism. Watching the clips Moore uses, and recalling them well, I can recognize various Saddam palaces and military and police centers getting the treatment. But these sites are not identified as such. In fact, I don't think Al Jazeera would, on a bad day, have transmitted anything so utterly propagandistic." While interviewing Hitchens on his show, Scarborough claimed to be outraged at Moore's portrayal of the Iraqi insurgency, claiming Moore's film suggests "those killing Americans in Iraq aren't the enemy, but rather they are the revolution and the Minutemen, who are sure to win their battle against the occupation" and that "Moore says that the enemy is George Bush and Saddam Hussein and Mr. Zarqawi and Mr. Bin Laden are no problem. ... Indeed, they are the Minutemen. They're the staunch American revolutionaries."

Moore has frequently stated his opinion that Saddam was a brutal tyrant, though this opinion is not mentioned in the film. He said calling attention to Saddam's crimes was unnecessary considering the corporate media had continually pressed that point themselves, making it public knowledge.

Who doesn't know that Saddam was a bad guy? The media did a wonderful job hammering that home every day in order to convince the public that they should support the war. For 20 seconds in this film, I become essentially the only person to say, I want you to take a look at the human beings that were living in Iraq in 2003. [...] Anyone who takes that and says that I'm trying to say that Saddam's Iraq was some utopia is just a crackpot.

Christopher Hitchens criticizes Moore for stating, in his film, that Iraq had not killed or attacked an American: "Moore asserts that Iraq under Saddam had never attacked or killed or even threatened (his words) any American. I never quite know whether Moore is as ignorant as he looks, or even if that would be humanly possible." Hitchens writes that Palestinian terrorists Muhammad Zaidan and Abu Nidal had been free to move in and out of Baghdad, and that Saddam's armed forces had exchanged fire and killed American soldiers during the first Gulf War. When interviewed by Jake Tapper, Moore denied having said Hussein's regime had not ever killed an American, insisting his movie had been misquoted: "That isn't what I said. Quote the movie directly. Murdered. The government of Iraq did not commit a premeditated murder on an American citizen." His narration is reproduced verbatim in The Official Fahrenheit Reader, including a chapter on critiques and supporting evidence.

==== Children of members of Congress serving in Iraq ====
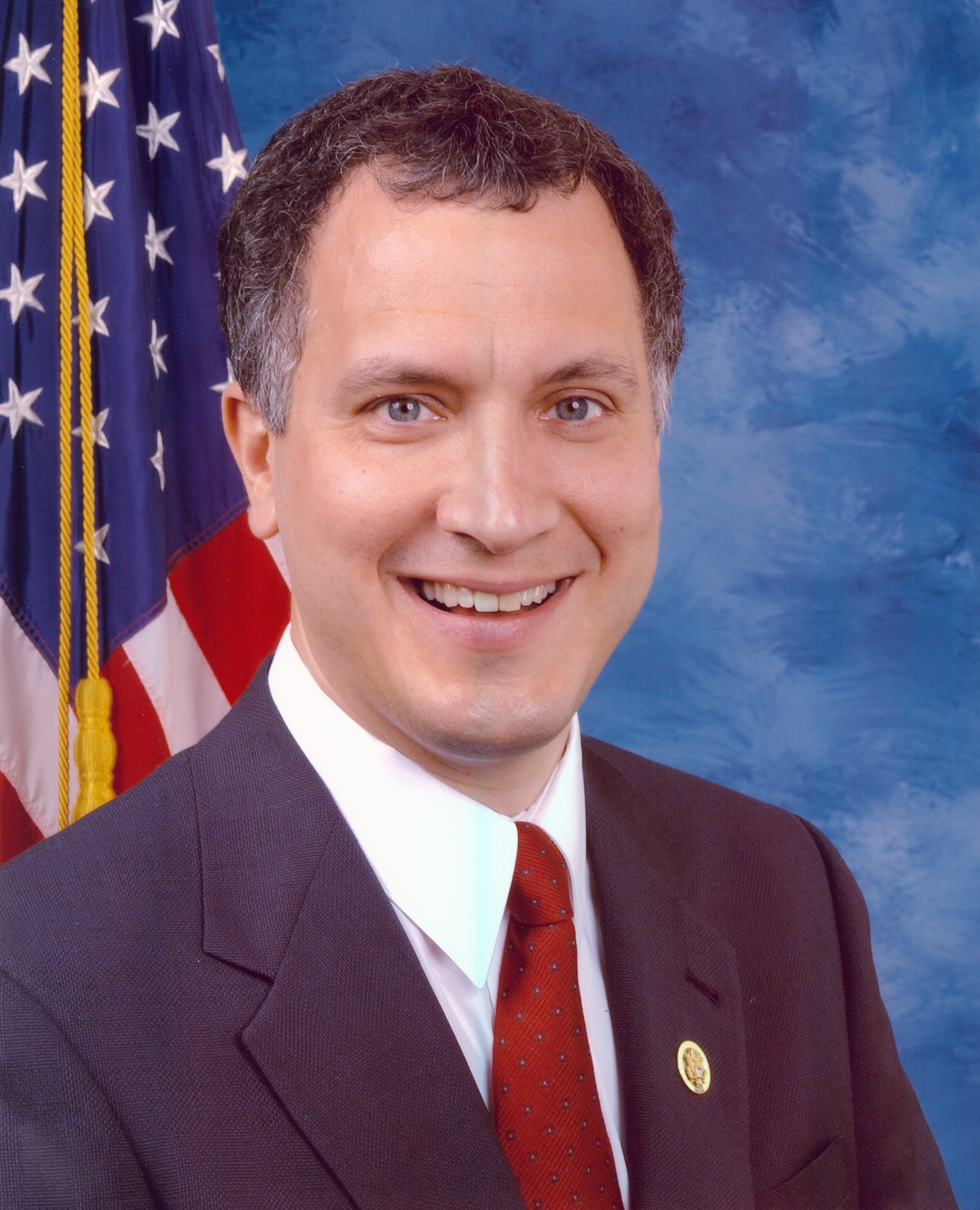
U.S. Congressman Mark Kennedy

Moore says that only one member of Congress had a child serving in Iraq: Army Staff Sergeant Brooks Johnson, the son of Senator Tim Johnson. According to the San Diego Union-Tribune, as of September 2004, at least two other Congressmen had children stationed in Iraq: the son of Congressman Duncan L. Hunter, United States Marine Corps Lieutenant Duncan D. Hunter (who was later elected to Congress himself); and the son of Joe Wilson, Army National Guard Captain Alan Wilson, and at least five other members of Congress had children serving in the military.

Fahrenheit 9/11 also used footage of Moore confronting various members of Congress, encouraging them to enlist their own children to fight in Iraq. Moore approached Congressman Mark Kennedy and showed Kennedy giving Moore a quizzical, confused look. Kennedy expressed displeasure about his portrayal, saying he offered to help Moore and also indicated he had a nephew serving in Afghanistan, but this was edited out of the film.

==== Raymond Plouhar ====
Raymond Plouhar (May 26, 1976 – June 26, 2006) was a United States Marine Corps staff sergeant killed by a roadside bomb in Anbar Province, Iraq, during the Iraq War. His death raised media attention because he had been filmed in Fahrenheit 9/11. Plouhar was acting as a recruiter for the U.S. Marine Corps at the time he was filmed by Moore, whose film portrayed Plouhar attempting to enlist recruits in Moore's hometown of Flint, Michigan. At the time, Plouhar was then taking time off from active duty in the wake of his having donated a kidney to an uncle. Plouhar's father reported that his son willingly allowed himself to be filmed, and was unaware that Moore was making a film critical of the Iraq War. Other Marines filmed in the segment claimed they were deceived, saying they were not told that the filming was associated with Moore, or would be used to criticize their activities. They did not make explicit whether they had asked the purpose of the film; however, the Marines indicated that Moore's crew represented themselves as a New York-based television production company, Westside Productions, interested in making a small documentary on high school career choices. A ten-year veteran of the U.S. Marine Corps, Plouhar was an infantry unit leader assigned to the 3rd Battalion, 5th Marines, 1st Marine Division, I Marine Expeditionary Force out of Marine Corps Base Camp Pendleton, California. He had been part of a unit engaged in projects to rebuild and revitalize schools in Iraq. He reportedly had 38 days left on his tour of duty at the time of his death. He was survived by his wife and two children.

=== Peter Damon lawsuit ===
Moore's inclusion of a 10-second clip with amputee Peter Damon was criticized. Damon said the filmmaker "should be ashamed of himself" for claiming that soldiers were deceived into supporting the Iraq War and for using his injuries as reason to oppose the conflict. Damon "agree[s] with the President 100%. A lot of the guys down at Walter Reed feel the same way." According to Damon's doctor, Lt. Col. Chester Buckenmaier, Moore took "a very positive thing we're doing for soldiers" who lost limbs and "used it to tell a lie." Responding to the criticism, associate producer Joanne Doroshow said, "Anybody who has seen the film knows we have nothing but the deepest respect for the soldiers who were wounded. One of the purposes of the movie was to examine the impossible situation they were put into and to raise questions about why they were sent there."

Peter Damon sued Moore in federal court for $85 million, alleging that the film gave a false impression and was defamatory. Moore's attorney argued in response that the film quoted Damon verbatim and did not take his statements out of context nor give a false impression. The judge agreed and dismissed Damon's suit. In March 2008, the First Circuit Court of Appeals unanimously affirmed the ruling in Moore's favor.

== Ray Bradbury's title dispute ==
The title of the film refers to Ray Bradbury's novel Fahrenheit 451 and the September 11 attacks of 2001. The Fahrenheit 451 reference is emphasized by the film's tagline "The temperature where freedom burns" (compared with Fahrenheit 451's tagline, "The temperature at which books burn"). Moore has stated that the title came from the subject of an e-mail he received from a fan shortly after September 11.

Bradbury was upset by what he considered the appropriation of his title, and wanted the film renamed. In response, Dan Gillmor wrote that titles cannot be copyrighted and that some of Bradbury's own titles had been copied.

== Move America Forward's letter-writing campaign ==
The conservative political action group Move America Forward mounted a letter-writing campaign pressuring theater chains not to screen the film, which it compared to "an al-Qaeda training video." "We've been causing them [the cinemas] an enormous amount of aggravation", said group member and talk radio host Melanie Morgan.

== Citizens United's FEC challenge ==
Citizens United, a conservative group run by David Bossie, filed a complaint before the Federal Election Commission charging that ads for the film constitute political advertising and thus may not be aired 60 days before an election or 30 days before a party convention. On August 5, the FEC unanimously dismissed the complaint, finding no evidence that the movie's ads had broken the law. A further complaint filed in 2005 was also rejected.

== Rebuttal documentaries ==
Documentary films made in response to Fahrenheit 9/11 include: Celsius 41.11 and Fahrenhype 9/11 (narrated by Ron Silver).

== Unauthorized copying ==
Unauthorized copying of the film was widespread. An early version taped at a cinema was distributed using the peer-to-peer file sharing protocol BitTorrent. The distributors expressed unhappiness and suggested potential legal action, but according to the Sunday Herald, Moore responded, "I don't have a problem with people downloading the movie and sharing it with people as long as they're not trying to make a profit off of my labor". A "mint copy" of the film possibly appeared on the Lionsgate website itself, reported The Inquirer. Unlicensed screenings were also held in Cuba.
