= Celsius 41.11 =

- Directed by: Kevin Knoblock
- Written by: Lionel Chetwynd; Ted Steinberg
- Produced by: Lionel Chetwynd
- Starring: Dan Rather; Fred Dalton Thompson; George W. Bush; John Kerry; Michael Moore; Fred Barnes; Michael Medved
- Distributed by: Citizens United
- Release dates: September 28, 2004 (Georgetown (Washington, D.C.)); September 30, 2004 (Liberty Film Festival); October 22, 2004 (United States)
- Running time: 72 minutes
- Country: United States
- Language: English
- Budget: $1 million
- Box office: $93,000 (estimated)

Celsius 41.11 is a 2004 political documentary film inspired by, and partially in response to Michael Moore's film Fahrenheit 9/11. The title was chosen because, according to the makers of the movie, 41.11 °C is "The Temperature at Which the Brain Begins to Die", which is the film's tag-line.

The film addresses five charges made against George W. Bush in Moore's film and criticizes 2004 Democratic Presidential candidate John Kerry. It was released during the run-up to the 2004 United States Presidential general election.

It took six weeks to make Celsius 41.11. The production was funded and the film distributed to a limited number of movie theaters by Citizens United, a conservative political organization. Celsius 41.11 performed less well at the box office than comparable left-leaning documentaries and significantly poorer than Fahrenheit 9/11. The producer attributed this to voter fatigue and to a timetabling clash with the World Series.

The critics' response was described as "irk[ed]" by the BBC. A number of critics described the film as a campaign advertisement for George W. Bush. Several believed that the movie would appeal primarily to convinced supporters of George W. Bush and was unlikely to sway undecided voters or change the opinion of Kerry supporters. The critics felt the film shared the flaws of Fahrenheit 9/11 without sharing all of its virtues; in particular, it was criticised for a comparative lack of emotion. The reliability of some of the individuals interviewed was questioned by The New York Times and The Boston Globe. Critics frequently compared the style to that of a PowerPoint presentation with some adding that the speed with which the film had been produced was evident in the quality of the finished product. Opinions as to the quality of the arguments advanced varied.

== Conception and production ==
The production of Celsius 41.11 was funded by the conservative political organization Citizens United. The organization's president, David Bossie, was surprised at the success of Fahrenheit 9/11 both at the box office and in rallying support for the Democratic political position. "After seeing Moore's impact, I wanted to counterpunch", he said to the Los Angeles Times in 2004, adding that, "Documentaries have become a weapon of the left". Celsius 41.11 took six weeks to make and includes a song, "John Boy", specially written and performed by the country music singer Larry Gatlin.

Celsius 41.11 was rated R by the Motion Picture Association of America because it contains a graphic image of an Iraqi torture victim and includes swearing on two occasions. The film's producers disagreed with the rating, stating that it wasn't "consistent with other films in theaters." They chose to appeal the rating but were ultimately unsuccessful.

== Synopsis ==
Celsius 41.11 defends Bush against five of the arguments advanced by Fahrenheit 9/11 and additionally criticizes John Kerry, arguing that his opposition to the Vietnam War and his military service in that same war are contradictory positions. The opening images of the film are of the second plane hitting the World Trade Center on September 11. The film then moves to clips of the demonstrations against the war in Iraq, including an interview with an unnamed protester who says she would be happy to live under a dictatorship if the ruler provided universal health care. The next segment shows images of dead children.

The film alleges that a feud between the White House and the CIA resulted in Bill Clinton refusing to broker the surrender of Osama bin Laden in 1997. It also contains a list of the terrorist attacks that have occurred since the Iran hostage crisis that one reviewer described as "chilling". Speeches made by John Kerry and running mate John Edwards on the danger posed by the weapons of mass destruction Iraq was accused of possessing are also included.

== Participants ==
- Fred Thompson – politician, former senator
- Charles Krauthammer – neo-conservative columnist, political commentator
- Michael Ledeen – foreign policy specialist
- Mansoor Ijaz – media commentator on terrorism
- Michael Barone – political analyst, pundit, journalist
- Michael Medved – neo-conservative political commentator
- Fred Barnes – neo-conservative political commentator
- Joshua Muravchik – scholar specialising in Middle East politics, democracy and the history of socialism
- Barbara Comstock – politician
- Victoria Toensing – lawyer, legal commentator
- Bill Sammon – Vice-president of Fox News
- John O'Neill – Vietnam War veteran, lawyer and spokesman for Swift Vets and POWs for Truth
- Alice S. Fisher - lawyer

== Theatrical release ==
Citizens United were prohibited by the Federal Election Commission from advertising the movie on television or funding the broadcast of the movie on television during the 60 days before the election when restrictions apply to political broadcasts by outside organizations. The premiere of Celsius 41.11 took place at the Loews theatre in Georgetown (Washington, D.C.) on September 28, 2004 and was attended by the author Jerome Corsi and the sister of the pilot whose plane crashed into the Pentagon on September 11, Debra Burlingame. Celsius 41.11 was also shown at the first Liberty Film Festival. Both Lions Gate Entertainment (the distributors of Fahrenheit 9/11) and Fox Searchlight (which specialises in the distribution of independent films) declined the opportunity to distribute the film to cinemas. David Bossie, the film's executive producer, believed that the distributors rejected the film on ideological grounds, while Lionel Chetwynd and Ted Steinberg felt that the close proximity of the election which gave the film an abnormally short shelf-life put the distributors off. Celsius 41.11 was eventually self-distributed by Citizens United. It was screened in 116 cinemas on its opening weekend and had a three-week theatrical run. Although the film was popular in conservative areas, on average box office takings were below those for comparable left-leaning political documentaries such as Going Upriver: The Long War of John Kerry and Outfoxed: Rupert Murdoch's War on Journalism. Lionel Chetwynd suggested that the low audiences were due to the film's late release date with respect to the 2004 United States Presidential campaign adding that opening on the same weekend as the World Series may have compounded the problem. Citizens United subsequently printed 200,000 DVDs of the film, many of which were given to its supporters.

== Response ==
In common with Fahrenheit 9/11, Celsius 41.11 proved to be a contentious film. It received 42 out of 100 on Metacritic based on 11 reviews and an 11% rotten rating on Rotten Tomatoes based on 18 reviews. The BBC described the newspaper critics response as "irk[ed]" commenting that "many newspapers, while not disagreeing with the facts of the documentary, have not been impressed with it as a piece of entertainment."

Reviewers generally agreed that the film would appeal most to those who were already convinced supporters of George W. Bush and was unlikely to change the views of those who opposed him. Kerry Lengel of The Arizona Republic said, "Celsius 41.11 isn't going to change many minds." Michael Graham of the National Review said, "I just don’t think there are a lot of people left willing to be persuaded. Some conservatives will watch and say “See, I told you so!” Liberals will watch and dismiss the arguments as partisan. Undecideds…well, they won’t watch it." Desson Thompson of The Washington Post and Robert Koehler of Variety said that the film preached to the choir. Some reviewers said that Celsius 41.11 felt like a campaign ad for Bush or, possibly, an attack ad against Kerry.

=== Comparisons to Fahrenheit 9/11 ===
Michael Graham of the National Review praised Celsius 41.11 saying that "unlike Michael Moore’s film, Celsius 41.11 is an actual documentary" and that the film was "far more logical" than Fahrenheit 9/11. However, Graham also added that "41.11 isn't nearly as emotionally powerful as Moore’s film", a view with which Duane Dudek of the Milwaukee Journal Sentinel concurred. Philip Kennicott of The Washington Post described Moore's film, Fahrenheit 9/11, as "well crafted" believing that, while Moore had angered the targets of his film he "went the extra mile, creatively, to do so". In contrast Kennicott described Celsius 41.11 as "dull, lazy and inconsistent". Celsius 41.11 was criticised for sharing some of what reviewers perceived to be the flaws of Fahrenheit 9/11. For example, Desson Thomson of The Washington Post (although generally positive about Celsius 41.11) said that in the case of both films "the spleen factor could poison small children". Writing in the Milwaukee Journal Sentinel Duane Dudek said, "as with Fahrenheit 9/11, it's impossible to separate the facts and analysis presented in Celsius from the filmmakers' intent." However, Celsius 41.11 was additionally criticised for failing to share what the reviewers perceived to be virtues of Moore's film. Robert Koelher of Variety said that "..."Celsius" shares Moore's blatant agit-prop but none of his humor or entertainment sense". Similarly, Michael Atikinson of The Village Voice regarded the film as "deliberately ap[ing] Michael Moore's modus operandi, minus the humor or any sense of sympathy for real people." Wesley Morris of The Boston Globe concluded that "..."Celsius 41.11" doesn't have anything on anyone as pointedly damning or funny as some of what Moore shows of the current Bush administration."

=== Comparison to FahrenHYPE 9/11 ===
Manohla Dargis of The New York Times compared Celsius 41.11 unfavorably to FahrenHYPE 9/11, another documentary film aimed at rebutting the arguments made by Michael Moore. While Dargis felt that the purpose of FahrenHYPE 9/11 was the detailed rebutting of the arguments put forward by Moore's film, she felt that the purpose of Celsius 41.11 was to "make you afraid — very, very afraid". She stated that Celsius 41.11 "presents a vision of the world verging on the apocalyptic". Dargis concluded "finally [the film is] interesting only because it represents another unconvincing effort on the part of conservatives to mount a viable critique of Mr. Moore."

=== Criticisms of the production ===
The Boston Globe and The New York Times both questioned the reliability of some of the individuals interviewed. The Globe called the experts "occasionally dubious" saying that they "offer[ed] drive-by disses and plain untruths". Manohla Dargis of The New York Times was particularly critical of the film for not detailing the extent of Mansoor Ijaz's investments in the Middle East or "just how intimately familiar he was with the nonsense of the Clinton White House". Both publications, however, spoke well of the contributions of Fred Thompson with The New York Times calling him "thoughtful" and the Globe adding that "with his level head and reflective words, [he] makes partisanship seem dignified."

Several critics felt that insufficient time had been spent on the film. Maitland McDonagh of TV Guide said that it "bears all the hallmarks of having been thrown together in a heated rush", a criticism echoed by Robert Koehler of Variety who called the editing "choppy". Wesley Morris of The Boston Globe described the film as "a seemingly last-minute series of talking heads and montages". A number of critics compared the style of the film to that of a PowerPoint presentation.

=== Overall response to the film ===
Opinions of the arguments advanced by the film varied widely. Michael Graham of the National Review said that the movie "does a solid job of logically confronting the (for lack of a better word) arguments Moore makes against Bush". Desson Thomson of The Washington Post concluded that "there are some very thought-provoking points, and the movie deserves a balanced listening-to." Tom Keogh of the Seattle Times felt that the arguments presented were "lightly persuasive" but that "there is nothing new here or usefully evenhanded." He eventually concluded, "It's not that Moore's film doesn't deserve an argument. But it does deserve a more thoughtful one." Duane Dudek said that "some of the film's charges are troubling", although he went on to note that "the film's arguments are the echo chamber opposite of Mr. Moore's". Wesley Morris of The Boston Globe called the film "a crude polemical mush". Maitland McDonagh of TV Guide called it a "shrill, repetitive screed" Stephanie Zacharek of Salon.com said it is "so bad it's almost like performance art". Michael Atkinson of The Village Voice wrote a particularly stinging review calling the movie a "desperate four-waller" and "a cut-rate vision of flabby white men defending their own bloodthirsty opportunism". Selecting it as one of the five worst films of 2004, Matthew Lucas of The Dispatch (Lexington) said of the film, "Displaying nowhere near the artistic flair that Michael Moore possesses, this film shows you that no matter what your political affiliations are, Moore makes a much more entertaining case."
