= 2026–27 United States network television schedule (morning) =

The 2026–27 morning network television schedule for the five major English-language commercial broadcast networks in the United States covers the weekday and weekend morning hours from September 2026 to August 2027. The schedule is followed by a list per network of returning and cancelled shows from the 2025–26 season. The daytime schedules for the five major networks that offer morning programming are expected to remain consistent with the prior television season.

Affiliates fill time periods not occupied by network programs with local or syndicated programming. PBS – which offers daytime programming through a children's program block, PBS Kids – is not included, as its member television stations have local flexibility over most of their schedules and broadcast times for network shows may vary. Also not included are MyNetworkTV (as the programming service also does not offer daytime programs of any kind), and Ion Television (as its schedule is composed mainly of syndicated reruns).

Fox and The CW has no network programming on weekday mornings, therefore is not included in the schedule.

On Saturday mornings, all of the networks lease the time to outside producers to produce programming to fulfill E/I programming obligations as mandated by the FCC.

== Legend ==
- Light blue indicates local programming.
- Yellow indicates talk shows.
- Pink indicates game shows.
- Blue-gray indicates news programming.
- Gold indicates public affairs programming.
- Light green indicates sporting events.
- Light purple indicates children's and/or E/I-compliant programming.
- Light teal indicates programs not applicable to the above categorizations.
- Light yellow indicates the current schedule.

== Schedule ==
- New series are highlighted in **bold**.
- All times correspond to U.S. Eastern and Pacific Time (select shows) scheduling (except for some live sports or events). Except where affiliates slot certain programs outside their network-dictated timeslots and The CW which airs its programming block at the same time in all time zones, subtract one hour for Central, Mountain, Pacific (for selected shows), Alaska, and Hawaii-Aleutian times.
- Local schedules may differ, as affiliates have the option to pre-empt or delay network programs. Such scheduling may be limited to preemptions caused by local or national breaking news or weather coverage (which may force stations to tape delay certain programs in overnight timeslots or defer them to a co-operated station or digital subchannel in their regular timeslot) and any major sports events scheduled to air in a weekday timeslot (mainly during major holidays). Stations may air shows at other times at their preference.
- All sporting events air live in all time zones in U.S. Eastern time, with local programming by affiliates in western time zones after game completion.

=== Weekdays ===
Network	6:00 a.m.	6:30 a.m.	7:00 a.m.	7:30 a.m.	8:00 a.m.	8:30 a.m.	9:00 a.m.	9:30 a.m.	10:00 a.m.	10:30 a.m.	11:00 a.m.	11:30 a.m.
ABC	Local and/or syndicated programming		Good Morning America				Local and/or syndicated programming				The View	
CBS	Local and/or syndicated programming		CBS Mornings				Local and/or syndicated programming		Let's Make a Deal		The Price Is Right	
NBC	Local and/or syndicated programming		Today				Today Third Hour		Today with Jenna & Sheinelle		Local and/or syndicated programming	

Notes:

- Depending on their choice of feed, CBS stations have the option of airing Let's Make a Deal at either 10:00 a.m. or 3:00 p.m. Eastern (airtime adjusted by time zone)

=== Saturday ===
Network		6:00 a.m.	6:30 a.m.	7:00 a.m.	7:30 a.m.	8:00 a.m.	8:30 a.m.	9:00 a.m.	9:30 a.m.	10:00 a.m.	10:30 a.m.	11:00 a.m.	11:30 a.m.
ABC		Local and/or syndicated programming		Good Morning America Weekend				**Jeff Corwin's Southern Wild**	The Champion's Edge with Bonnie Bernstein	Hearts of Heroes	Home for Good	Outback Adventures with Tim Faulkner (R)	Hearts of Heroes
CBS		Local and/or syndicated programming		CBS Saturday Morning				**Lucky Dog: Paws with Purpose**	Lucky Dog: Down Under	Hope in the Wild (R)	The Visioneers with Zay Harding	Dr. Chris: Pet Vet (R)	The Open Road with Dr. Chris (R)
The CW		Local and/or syndicated programming				Jack Hanna's Into the Wild						Local and/or syndicated programming	
Fox	Fall	Local and/or syndicated programming		Xploration Super Animals	Xploration Nature Knows Best	Xploration DIY Sci	Xploration Outer Space	Xploration Awesome Planet	Xploration Second Chance Pets	Big Noon Kickoff			
Fox	Winter	Local and/or syndicated programming		Xploration Super Animals	Xploration Nature Knows Best	Xploration DIY Sci	Xploration Outer Space	Xploration Awesome Planet	Xploration Second Chance Pets	Local and/or syndicated programming			Fox College Hoops Tip Off
Fox	Spring	Local and/or syndicated programming		Xploration Super Animals	Xploration Nature Knows Best	Xploration DIY Sci	Xploration Outer Space	Xploration Awesome Planet	Xploration Second Chance Pets	Local and/or syndicated programming			
NBC		Local and/or syndicated programming		Saturday Today			Local and/or syndicated programming	Mutual of Omaha's Wild Kingdom Protecting the Wild	Earth Odyssey with Dylan Dreyer	The Great American Journey	Wild Child	Earth Odyssey with Dylan Dreyer	Wild Child

Notes:

- To comply with FCC educational programming regulations, stations may defer certain programs featured in their respective network's E/I program blocks to determined weekend late morning or afternoon time periods if a sporting event is not scheduled in the timeslot or in place of paid programming that would otherwise be scheduled.
- Airtimes of sporting events and, on NBC, the Saturday edition of Today may vary depending on the offerings scheduled for that weekend. (Fox and/or NBC may air sports programming on Saturday mornings; NBC may preempt or abbreviate the length of Today to accommodate sports programming airing that day, forcing its stations to air some of the network's E/I-compliant programs in other open weekend time slots to fulfill educational content obligations.)

=== Sunday ===
Network		6:00 a.m.	6:30 a.m.	7:00 a.m.	7:30 a.m.	8:00 a.m.	8:30 a.m.	9:00 a.m.	9:30 a.m.	10:00 a.m.	10:30 a.m.	11:00 a.m.	11:30 a.m.
ABC		Local and/or syndicated programming		Good Morning America Weekend		Local and/or syndicated programming		This Week		Local and/or syndicated programming			
CBS		Local and/or syndicated programming						CBS Sunday Morning			Face the Nation		Local and/or syndicated programming
The CW		Local and/or syndicated programming								**The Hill Sunday with Chris Stirewalt**		Local and/or syndicated programming	
Fox	Fall	Local and/or syndicated programming						Fox News Sunday		Local and/or syndicated programming		Fox NFL Kickoff	
Fox	Winter	Local and/or syndicated programming						Fox News Sunday		Local and/or syndicated programming			
NBC		Local and/or syndicated programming		Sunday Today		Local and/or syndicated programming		Meet the Press		Local and/or syndicated programming			

Notes:

- To comply with FCC educational programming regulations, stations may defer certain programs featured in their respective network's E/I program blocks to determined weekend late morning or afternoon time periods if a sporting event is not scheduled in the timeslot or in place of paid programming that would otherwise be scheduled.
- Airtimes of sporting events may vary depending on the offerings scheduled for that weekend.

== By network ==
=== ABC ===
Returning series:

- ABC News
  - Good Morning America
  - This Week with George Stephanopoulos
- Weekend Adventure
  - The Champion's Edge with Bonnie Bernstein
  - Hearts of Heroes (shared with Go Time)
  - Home for Good (shared with Go Time)
  - Outback Adventures with Tim Faulkner (reruns)
- The View

New series:

- Weekend Adventure
  - Jeff Corwin's Southern Wild

Not returning from 2025–26:

- Weekend Adventure
  - Donkey King (moved to Go Time)
  - Jack Hanna's Passport
  - Oh Baby! with Anji Corley (moved to Go Time)
  - Wildlife Nation with Jeff Corwin

=== CBS ===
Returning series:

- CBS WKND
  - Dr. Chris: Pet Vet (reruns)
  - Hope in the Wild (R)
  - Lucky Dog: Down Under
  - The Open Road with Dr. Chris (reruns)
  - The Visioneers with Zay Harding
- CBS News
  - CBS Mornings
  - CBS Saturday Morning
  - CBS Sunday Morning
  - Face the Nation
- Let's Make a Deal
- The Price Is Right

New series:

- CBS WKND
  - Lucky Dog: Paws with Purpose

Not returning from 2025–26:

- CBS WKND
  - The Henry Ford's Innovation Nation (reruns)
  - Lucky Dog: Reunions
  - Mission Unstoppable
  - Tails of Valor (reruns)

=== The CW ===
Returning series:

- One Magnificent Morning
  - Jack Hanna's Into the Wild

New series:

- The Hill Sunday with Chris Stirewalt

Not returning from 2025–26:

- One Magnificent Morning
  - Ocean Mysteries with Jeff Corwin

=== Fox ===
Returning series:

- Fox News Sunday
- Fox Sports
  - Big Noon Kickoff
  - Fox NFL Kickoff
- Xploration Station
  - Xploration Awesome Planet
  - Xploration DIY Sci
  - Xploration Nature Knows Best
  - Xploration Outer Space
  - Xploration Second Chance Pets
  - Xploration Super Animals

=== NBC ===
Returning series:

- The More You Know
  - Earth Odyssey with Dylan Dreyer
  - The Great American Journey
  - Mutual of Omaha's Wild Kingdom Protecting the Wild
  - Wild Child
- NBC News
  - Meet the Press
  - Today
    - Today Third Hour
    - Saturday Today
    - Today with Jenna & Sheinelle
    - Sunday Today with Willie Geist

Not returning from 2025–26:

- The More You Know
  - Forever Young with Dr. Pablo Prichard
  - Tails of Valor (reruns)

== See also ==
- 2026–27 United States network television schedule (prime-time)
- 2026–27 United States network television schedule (daytime)
- 2026–27 United States network television schedule (late night)
- 2026–27 United States network television schedule (overnight)
