= Corey Lewandowski =

American political operative and commentator (born 1973)

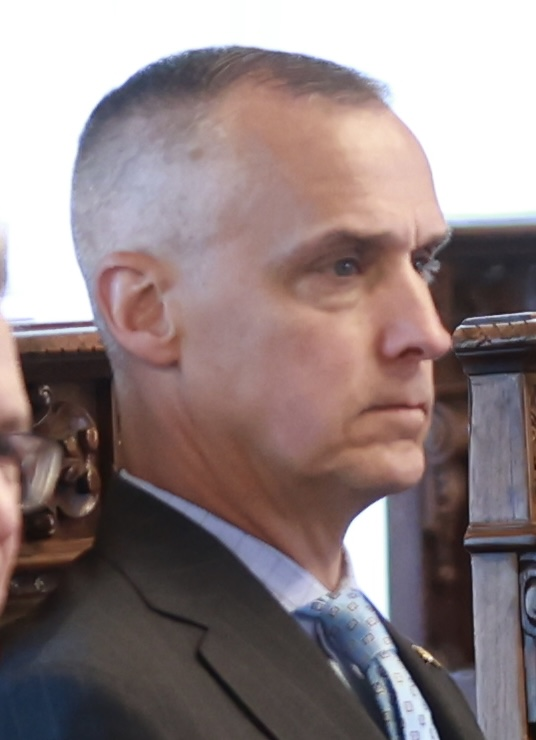
- Lewandowski in 2025

Senior Advisor to the Secretary of Homeland Security
- In office April 8, 2025 – March 24, 2026
- President: Donald Trump
- Secretary: Kristi Noem
- Preceded by: Position established

Personal details
- Born: Corey Ryan Lewandoski; September 18, 1973 (age 53) Lowell, Massachusetts, U.S.
- Party: Republican
- Spouse: Alison Hardy (m. 2005)
- Children: 4
- Education: University of Massachusetts, Lowell (BA); American University (MA)

Corey Ryan Lewandowski (/ˌluːənˈdaʊski/; born September 18, 1973) is an American political operative, lobbyist, and pundit politically aligned with Donald Trump. He served as the first campaign manager for Trump's 2016 presidential campaign. He has also worked as a political commentator for CNN, One America News Network (OANN), and Fox News, and as acting chief of staff to Secretary of Homeland Security Kristi Noem.

Prior to his appointment by Trump, Lewandowski had managed other Republican election campaigns, worked in various clerical roles for members of congress, the Republican National Committee and conservative advocacy group Americans for Prosperity, and as a lobbyist. He was also employed as a Marine Patrol Officer for the New Hampshire State Police and ran unsuccessfully for office in both Massachusetts and New Hampshire. Lewandowski also "very seriously" considered running for Republican nomination in the 2020 US Senate election in New Hampshire to oppose incumbent Democrat, Jeanne Shaheen. Ultimately, he decided not to run.

As of March 2026, Lewandowski served under Secretary of Homeland Security Kristi Noem as her acting chief of staff in an unpaid special government employee (SGE) position, until Noem was given another position. He was reportedly in an extramarital relationship with Noem.

== Early career ==
=== 1994 Massachusetts State House campaign ===
In 1994, while an undergraduate student, Lewandowski ran for a seat in the Massachusetts House of Representatives as a write-in candidate in the Republican primary. He received 143 votes, falling short of the 150 votes needed to win the party's nomination for the ballot. In the November general election, the seat was won by Thomas A. Golden Jr., a Democrat. Golden received 7,157 votes, while Lewandowski received 7 votes.

=== Early work ===
After graduating from college, Lewandowski worked as an aide for Republican Massachusetts Congressman Peter G. Torkildsen from January 1996 to January 1997, while a graduate student at American University. Also while a student in 1997, Lewandowski interned for Massachusetts State Senator Steven C. Panagiotakos, a Democrat.

From December 1997 to February 2001, Lewandowski worked as an administrative assistant for Ohio Republican Bob Ney, a U.S. Congressman. In 2007, before Ney was sentenced on federal corruption charges arising from the Abramoff lobbying scandal, Lewandowski wrote a letter to the presiding judge, saying that Ney was a mentor and "surrogate father" to him and asking for leniency in sentencing.

In 1999, while working for Ney, Lewandowski brought a loaded handgun in a laundry bag into the Longworth House Office Building. He was arrested and charged with a misdemeanor. Lewandowski said it was an accident, that he forgot the gun was in the bag when he put the laundry in it. The charges eventually were dismissed; Lewandowski then unsuccessfully fought for four years to get the gun back, filing lawsuits in multiple District of Columbia and federal courts.

After leaving Ney's office, Lewandowski worked most of 2001 for the Republican National Committee as the Northeast legislative political director.

=== Smith campaign ===
Lewandowski was the campaign manager for the 2002 re-election campaign of U.S. Senator Robert C. Smith of New Hampshire. Smith was challenged in the Republican primary by John E. Sununu.

Speaking about Sununu, Lewandowski said, "The people of New Hampshire want someone in the U.S. Senate with clear, concise views on terrorism. They'll judge a congressman based on the people he associates with, his voting record and his campaign contributions." Lewandowski told a reporter he would be interested to know whether anyone associated with Hamas had attended a fundraising event for Sununu. (Lewandowski cited contributions made by Washington lawyer George Salem to Sununu; Salem, who chaired Arab Americans for Bush-Cheney during the 2000 Bush/Cheney campaign, was the attorney for the Holy Land Foundation for Relief and Development, which had its assets frozen by the U.S. government in 2001 on suspicion of ties to Hamas.) Lewandowski's comments were interpreted as publicly suggesting that Sununu, who is of Lebanese descent, had divided loyalties in fighting terrorism.

Former New Hampshire Governor Steve Merrill said, "The politics of ethnic slurs and bigotry have no place in any campaign." Former New Hampshire Senator Warren Rudman said, "Bob Smith is a better human being than that, and he ought to tell his people to watch themselves." President George W. Bush's spokesperson said, "The White House called Senator Smith's office ... Remarks that paint Arab Americans with a broad brush aren't helpful. We need to reassure Arab Americans that this war is about al-Qaida, not Islam. Mr. Salem is a good friend of the president's and an honorable man."

Smith's press secretary said Lewandowski was "merely responding to media inquiries" about Salem's fund raising and that "Senator Smith has repeatedly said this campaign is about records—Congressman Sununu's record and Senator Smith's record. Someone's ethnic background has absolutely nothing to do with this election."

Sununu defeated Smith in the Republican primary, winning 53% of the vote to Smith's 45%. Smith was the first sitting U.S. senator in ten years to lose a primary campaign.

=== Schwartz MSL, Americans for Prosperity, and other work ===
From 2003 to 2004, Lewandowski was executive director of the New England Seafood Producers Association.

From 2004 to 2012, Lewandowski worked for Schwartz MSL, a strategic communication and engagement firm where, according to his LinkedIn profile, he served as director of public affairs from September 2004 until July 2012. Lewandowski was registered as a lobbyist for Schwartz MSL on behalf of Passport Systems in 2011, lobbying on homeland security issues. Schwartz represented Passport Systems for six years, and the firm paid Schwartz more than $350,000 (~$493,474 in 2025) over that period. Between 2008 and 2011, Passport Systems secured more than $23.9 million in federal funds. Lewandowski represented two other clients: health care software company Logical Images and solar-power company Borrego Solar.

Lewandowski graduated from the New Hampshire police academy in 2006 and worked from 2006 to 2010 as a seasonal marine patrol officer with the New Hampshire State Police.

In 2008, Lewandowski began working for Americans for Prosperity, a Koch brothers-backed advocacy group. Lewandowski's period working for Americans for Prosperity overlapped with his tenure as a marine patrol officer and registered federal lobbyist. Lewandowski was Americans for Prosperity's New Hampshire director, and East Coast regional director before becoming the national director of voter registration, a position he held until January 2015. Lewandowski's term at Americans for Prosperity was described by Politico as "tumultuous" and marked by "fiery confrontations" with other AFP employees.

While working for Americans for Prosperity, Lewandowski criticized the Regional Greenhouse Gas Initiative, a cap-and-trade system for state utilities, saying "it does nothing to reduce greenhouse gases because jobs and businesses just move to other states." At the same time, Lewandowski lobbied for Borrego Solar, helping to secure a $500,000 (~$719,514 in 2025) earmark in the 2010 Energy and Water Appropriations Act that benefited a solar electricity project in Lancaster, Massachusetts, that Borrego was involved in. Newsweek noted, "though he had succeeded as a pro-solar lobbyist looking for government assistance, at AFP he waged a campaign against government programs that supported green energy."

In 2012, while still working for Americans for Prosperity, Lewandowski unsuccessfully ran for town treasurer of Windham, New Hampshire. NPR reported that during the campaign, Lewandowski "upended the town's politics, using public records laws to probe local government and launching robocalls targeted at voters to stoke outrage over a visit to the town by President Obama." Robert Skinner defeated Lewandowski, receiving 1,941 votes to Lewandowski's 714.

== Trump 2016 presidential campaign ==
Lewandowski first met Trump in April 2014 at a political event in New Hampshire. In January 2015, six months before Trump announced his campaign, Lewandowski was invited to Trump Tower, where he accepted an offer from Trump to become campaign manager. His salary was $20,000 (~$26,506 in 2025) per month.

When Lewandowski was hired, Trump's political staff consisted of three people: his lawyer Michael D. Cohen, veteran operative Roger Stone, and aide Sam Nunberg. In April 2016, another veteran GOP operative, Paul Manafort, was hired; the following month Manafort was named "campaign chairman." Nunberg was dismissed in August 2015; he believes that it was Lewandowski and campaign press secretary Hope Hicks who asked Trump for his ouster. Stone left the campaign a week later.

Lewandowski's motto as Trump's campaign manager was "Let Trump be Trump"; those words appeared on his office white board. Trump said of Lewandowski, "He leaves me alone, but he knows when to make his presence felt."

After a win in New Hampshire on February 9, 2016, Trump acknowledged Lewandowski's role in the win by praising his ground game.

=== Departure ===
In April 2016, Lewandowski's influence within the Trump campaign was reported to be waning. On the morning of June 20, 2016, the Trump campaign was served with a legal complaint from its North Carolina Digital Director, Vincent Bordini. The complaint alleged that the North Carolina State Director Earl Phillip, who was accused of stolen valor, pointed a firearm at more than one staffer and the story was suppressed by Stuart Jolly, the National Field Director for the Trump Campaign. Corey Lewandowski had tasked Stuart Jolly and Michael Glassner with handling the issue. Later that morning on June 20, 2016, Trump's campaign announced that it was parting ways with Lewandowski; according to reports, Lewandowski was dismissed, although Donald Trump Jr., Trump's son, described the split as "amicable." The move occurred after Lewandowski clashed with Trump chief strategist and campaign chairman Paul Manafort in an internal "power struggle." After Lewandowski's departure, Manafort (who had been brought on the campaign in March 2016) became the de facto campaign manager.

== First Trump term, political commentary, and lobbying activities ==
=== CNN ===
Days after Lewandowski left the Trump campaign, he was hired by the cable news network CNN as a political commentator. Lewandowski remains subject to a non-disclosure agreement that he signed with Trump, forbidding him "from making disparaging or revealing remarks about the candidate." Lewandowski received severance pay from the Trump campaign while working for CNN. In July 2016, after the group Media Matters for America noted that CNN had not disclosed this to viewers, CNN hosts began making on-air disclosures of the severance payments before Lewandowski's appearances.

In July 2016, Lewandowski defended Trump who had been criticized after tweeting a graphic that labeled Hillary Clinton the "most corrupt candidate" alongside a pile of cash and a six-pointed star evoking the Star of David. (The image originated on an Internet message board featuring antisemitic conspiracy theories). During an appearance on CNN's State of the Union with Brianna Keilar, Lewandowski denied allegations of antisemitism and said that criticism of the tweet was "political correctness run amok."

In an August 2016 appearance on CNN, Lewandowski espoused the "birther" conspiracy theory, suggesting that President Barack Obama was not a natural-born-citizen of the United States. Lewandowski's statement was criticized by the fellow panelist, Bakari Sellers.

On November 11, 2016, Lewandowski resigned as a CNN commentator amid speculations that he would play a role in the Trump administration.

=== Involvement with Donald Trump ===
According to the Mueller Report, Lewandowski had a "close" relationship with President Donald Trump, of whom Lewandowski was a "devotee".

On June 19, 2017, Lewandowski (a private citizen) joined President Trump in the Oval Office for a one-on-one meeting. Trump told Lewandowski that he would not have appointed Attorney General Jeff Sessions if he had known that Sessions would recuse himself from the investigation into Russia and the Trump campaign. Trump dictated to Lewandowski a statement that Sessions should make, which would have stated that Trump did nothing wrong, and limited the special counsel investigation into future election interference only. Lewandowski arranged for Sessions to visit him because he did not want to be publicly recorded visiting the Department of Justice. Sessions canceled the meeting due to a last-minute conflict. After Lewandowski left Washington D.C., he asked White House official Rick Dearborn if he could pass a message to Sessions, without stating the contents of the message. Dearborn agreed. Lewandowski did so as he felt Dearborn was working in the government and had a better relationship with Sessions than he had.

On June 19, 2017, Lewandowski again met Trump one-on-one in the Oval Office. Trump inquired if Lewandowski passed the message to Sessions. Lewandowski replied that it would be done soon. Trump declared that if Sessions would not meet Lewandowski, Lewandowski should tell Sessions that Sessions was fired. Right after the meeting, Lewandowski gave Trump's message to Dearborn to pass to Sessions. Dearborn told Lewandowski he had 'handled the situation', but he actually deliberately did not deliver the message. Lewandowski was interviewed as part of the special counsel investigation with regard to whether Trump had committed obstruction of justice, where he recounted the events above. In an MSNBC interview on the matter he said: "I don't ever remember the president ever asking me to get involved with Jeff Sessions or the Department of Justice in any way, shape or form ever."

In September 2019, Lewandowski was called to testify in front of the House Judiciary Committee. Asked to explain his discrepancy in what he told Mueller and what he told the media above, Lewandowski stated: "I have no obligation to be honest with the media because they're just as dishonest as anyone else."

Acting Secretary of Defense Christopher Miller appointed Lewandowski to the Defense Business Board in December 2020. The Pentagon later prevented Lewandowski from being seated and then Defense Secretary Lloyd Austin fired Lewandowski as part of a purge of the Pentagon's advisory boards to derail Trump's last-minute installation of political loyalists.

=== OANN ===
After leaving CNN, Lewandowski worked as a political commentator for the cable news television channel One America News Network (OANN). While he mainly worked for OANN, he made sporadic appearances on Fox News. Lewandowski was fired from OANN on July 31, 2017, for appearing on news networks outside of OANN.

=== Avenue Strategies ===
On December 21, 2016, Lewandowski and Barry Bennett, a "former Trump senior adviser", whom Lewandowski had known for ten years, co-founded as equal partners a political consulting firm called Avenue Strategies. They were joined by other Trump presidential campaign veterans. Bennett, Mike Rubino, Jason Osborne, and most of Lewandowski's associates at Avenue Strategies filed lobbying registrations. Mainly because of Lewandowski, Avenue Strategies soon became one of "the highest-profile government-affairs outfits in Washington". Avenue Strategies' office "overlooks the White House", and Lewandowski has "relatively unimpeded access" to President Trump either by phone or in person at the White House. Access to President Trump can be "highly lucrative" — "relatively few established K Street powerhouses have ties to the new president".

Clients of Avenue included Citgo Petroleum Corporation (Citgo), Puerto Rico, a Florida sanctuary for big cats, and Community Choice Financial, a large payday lender.

Lewandowski did not formally register as a lobbyist as he did not consider himself to be a lobbyist. However, he was criticized by "competing lobbyists and ethics watchdogs" for "flouting the spirit of the lobbying rules, and abusing his access to the Trump White House". On May 3, 2017, Public Citizen, a "government-ethics group, asked the U.S. Department of Justice to investigate whether Lewandowski should have registered as a foreign or domestic lobbyist". Lewandowski left Avenue Strategies the next day.

==== Washington East West Political Strategies ====
In an article published on April 28, 2017 POLITICO revealed that they had obtained documents about Washington East West Political Strategies — an "affiliate of Avenue Strategies". It was one of "several international recruitment vehicles" through which business partners globally — including those in the Middle East, Canada, and Central America — could "earn commissions by enlisting international clients" for Avenue Strategies. East West solicited "business in Eastern Europe and elsewhere by offering access to Trump, Vice President Mike Pence and other top administration officials". The documents described "numerous proposed activities that would seem to trigger Foreign Agents Registration Act (FARA) registration". East West was created by Lewandowski, Bennett, and associates. Avenue Strategies stated that no business had been conducted under the affiliate, and on May 3, 2017, Avenue Strategies dissolved East West.

=== Lewandowski Strategic Advisors ===
On May 12, 2017, eight days after leaving Avenue Strategies, Lewandowski incorporated Lewandowski Strategic Advisors in Delaware, which, as an advisory firm, does not register as a lobbyist or disclose its clients. He then sought to recruit David Bossie and George Gigicos.

In July 2017, Community Choice Financial, a payday lender, offered Lewandowski a $20,000-a-month retainer. On the July 30, 2017 episode of Meet the Press, Lewandowski told President Trump to fire Richard Cordray, the Director of the Consumer Financial Protection Bureau; Cordray had led efforts to enact new payday lending regulations. When Chuck Todd then asked Lewandowski if he was advocating for a client, Lewandowski replied "No, no. I have no clients whatsoever".

=== Turnberry Solutions LLC ===
In 2017, Lewandowski was reported to be working as a lobbyist for Turnberry Solutions LLC, though he denied having any involvement with the firm.

=== U.S. military base in Poland ===
In 2018, Lewandowski and Jill Kelley, a former U.S. diplomatic and national security advisor, had a meeting with the Polish government to set up a U.S. military base in Poland, called "Fort Trump," with Poland paying for all the costs, to improve their national security and gain better relations with the U.S. military and Trump administration.

=== Memoir ===
In December 2017, the memoir Let Trump Be Trump, co-authored by Lewandowski and David Bossie, was published by Center Street. The memoir chronicles Lewandowski's and Bossie's experiences working for Donald Trump's 2016 presidential campaign.

=== Mocking of an immigrant child with Down syndrome ===
On June 19, 2018, Lewandowski appeared on Fox News alongside Democratic strategist Zac Petkanas. When Petkanas mentioned a case of a 10-year-old immigrant girl with Down syndrome who had been forcibly taken away from her mother under the Trump administration family separation policy and allegedly put in a cage, Lewandowski responded "womp, womp" (an onomatopoeia for the "sad trombone" sound effect that often accompanies a comedic failure), which angered Petkanas and received widespread criticism from various sources. Former Fox News contributor Meghan McCain commented: "This is so horrible, even by Lewandowski standards." Appearing on Fox News on June 20, Lewandowski declined to apologize for the remark and instead reiterated his belief that undocumented immigrants are criminals who should be held accountable. The next day, Lewandowski was dropped by Leading Authorities, Inc., a speakers bureau based in Washington D.C.

Lewandowski later revisited the topic of the 10-year-old immigrant on CNN, asserting, contrary to the available evidence, that the "10-year-old that was separated at the border was separated because her mother was a member—or a potential member—of a child-smuggling ring.” However, U.S. Customs and Border Protection said she was a "material witness", not being charged with illegal entry.

=== Visit to Israel ===
In December 2019, Lewandowski and David Bossie visited Israel to meet with Prime Minister Benjamin Netanyahu. The visit was aimed at offering strategic advice for Netanyahu's upcoming election campaign.

=== Potential 2020 United States Senate campaign ===
On August 1, 2019, Lewandowski announced in a statement to New Hampshire ABC-affiliate WMUR that he was "very seriously" considering seeking the Republican nomination to oppose incumbent Democratic Senator Jeanne Shaheen in the 2020 U.S. Senate election in New Hampshire. This announcement closely followed a report of ongoing attempts by the Republican National Committee to draft Lewandowski to seek the seat. At a Donald Trump 2020 presidential campaign rally in Manchester, New Hampshire on August 15, Trump praised Lewandowski and encouraged him to enter the race. Lewandowski, in the audience, declined to make a statement about his candidacy.

On August 18, Lewandowski said in an interview on WNYM, a New York-based conservative talk radio station, that he was still considering a run and added that "if I get into this race, I’m going to win.

On December 31, 2019, Lewandowski announced he would not run for Senate in New Hampshire saying, "After much consideration I have decided to forgo a campaign for the US Senate," in a tweet. He also said in the tweet, "I am certain I would have won".

== Trump 2024 presidential campaign and second Trump term ==
On August 15, 2024, Lewandowski and four others were named as senior advisers to the Trump campaign, after his influence increased following his work earlier in the year at the Republican National Convention in Milwaukee, Wisconsin. In advance of Lewandowski returning to the campaign, it was reported that he had suggested he would be taking over the campaign, but days later, Trump described his role as a "personal envoy". On October 7, 2024, The Guardian reported that Lewandowski had been told to focus on being a surrogate in New Hampshire after effectively losing an internal power struggle for control of the campaign.

While DHS Secretary Kristi Noem was participating in an immigration raid on April 8, 2025, she was accompanied by Lewandowski, who introduced himself to the federal agents as "chief of staff". DHS later clarified that he is an adviser to DHS and a Special government employee (SGE). The Wall Street Journal subsequently described Lewandowski as Noem's "de facto chief of staff," adding that there were "White House concerns about their relationship". The Atlantic further reported that Lewandowski was making staffing decisions at the DHS, and deciding which information gets relayed to Noem, and which contractors get hired. When then-FEMA administrator Cameron Hamilton testified before Congress on May 7, 2025, stating, "I do not believe it is in the best interest of the American people to eliminate the Federal Emergency Management Agency", a position which differed from the Trump administration, he was summoned to Noem's office the following day, and was fired by Lewandowski, sitting at Noem's desk.

CBP officer Gregory Bovino stated in a September 2025 email exchange that in matters of interior immigration enforcement he reported directly to Lewandowski, rather than to Todd Lyons of ICE, writing "Mr. Lyons said he was in charge, and I corrected him saying I report to Corey Lewandowski."

According to The Wall Street Journal, Lewandowski fired a pilot for leaving one of Noem's blankets on a plane, then immediately rehired the pilot when it was discovered that no other pilot could fly them home.

After Noem left DHS in March 2026 it was reported that Lewandowski would also lose his special government employee position. In mid-March, NBC News reported that DHS contractors, including GEO Group and Salus Worldwide Solutions, told White House officials they had been asked to make "pay to play" payments to Lewandowski, in order to receive government contracts. The allegations were denied by spokespeople for Lewandowski. Democratic ranking members of three US House of Representatives oversight committees wrote DHS on March 18 to demand it preserve all records regarding Lewandowski's role in the department.

== Personal life ==
Lewandowski was raised in Lowell, Massachusetts. One of his grandfathers was a printer. He is of Polish and French-Canadian descent. Lewandowski graduated in 1991 from Lowell Catholic High School, a private, not-for-profit, college-preparatory school in Lowell. In 1995, he graduated from the University of Massachusetts Lowell with a B.A. in political science. He received a master's degree in political science from American University in Washington, D.C., in 1997.

Lewandowski met his future wife Alison Hardy when he was in ninth grade and she was in eighth grade. Together they have four children. Lewandowski identifies himself as Catholic.

In September 2021, conservative media outlet American Greatness reported that Lewandowski was having an extramarital affair with the married South Dakota governor Kristi Noem, for whom he had long been a political advisor. Noem called the report a "disgusting lie", saying, "these old, tired attacks on conservative women are based on a falsehood that we can't achieve anything without a man's help."

According to New York Magazine, despite denials, they were widely understood by those who work with them to be romantically attached. In February 2026, The Wall Street Journal reported that sources "said they do little to hide their relationship inside the department," that Lewandowski "spends time" at Noem's government housing, and that the pair have been traveling in a leased luxury jet "with a private cabin in the back".

== Legal issues ==
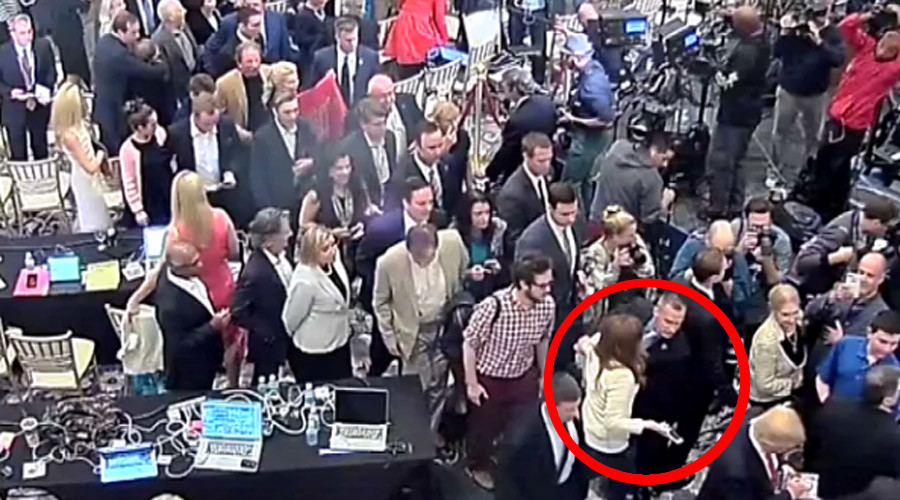
Capture from a police video showing Lewandowski, while working as Donald Trump's campaign manager, grabbing the arm of Michelle Fields, a former Breitbart reporter

=== Altercation with Michelle Fields ===
On March 10, 2016, Michelle Fields, a reporter for Breitbart News, wrote that, after she asked Donald Trump a question when she approached him after a March 8, 2016, press conference in Jupiter, Florida, she was forcefully moved out of the way of the Trump entourage by Lewandowski as Lewandowski attempted to exit next to Trump. It was reported that Lewandowski was acting in response to a Secret Service pathway to ensure it remained open and clear. On March 29, Lewandowski was charged with one count of simple battery by the Jupiter Police Department and surrendered himself to the authorities, after releasing a statement maintaining his innocence.

Two weeks later, Palm Beach County State Attorney Dave Aronberg said that his office would not prosecute Lewandowski. Although they believed that "there was probable cause to make an arrest" and "the facts support the allegation that Mr. Lewandowski did grab Ms. Fields' arm against her will .... the evidence cannot prove all legally required elements of the crime alleged and is insufficient to support a criminal prosecution".

That same year on March 19, 2016, during a campaign event in Tucson, Arizona, Lewandowski drew criticism for his handling of a protester. Although a video showed Lewandowski grabbing the protester by the collar, the campaign and Lewandowski denied doing so.

=== Sexual harassment allegations and charges ===
On November 28, 2017, a pro-Trump performer, Joy Villa, filed a police complaint against Lewandowski for allegedly slapping her buttocks at a holiday party at the Trump Hotel in Washington, D.C. Villa alleged that after she told him that she could report him for sexual harassment, Lewandowski said, "I work in the private sector" and slapped her again. Lewandowski responded to the allegations by saying that "There is a due process and there is a process which they will go through to determine a person's innocence."

In September 2021, Lewandowski attended a charity dinner at the Westgate Las Vegas hotel. Another attendee at the dinner, Trashelle Odom, the wife of Trump donor John Odom, accused Lewandowski of making unwanted sexual advances to her during the dinner, including "repeatedly touching her, including on her leg and buttocks, and speaking to her in sexually graphic terms." Odom alleged that Lewandowski "stalked" her throughout the hotel that hosted the event; witnesses said that Lewandowski appeared intoxicated.

In September 2022, Lewandowski was charged with misdemeanor battery in Clark County, Nevada court in connection with the incident. The same month, Lewandowski made a plea agreement in which he did not admit wrongdoing, but agreed to pay a $1,000 fine, serve 50 hours of community service, and take eight hours of "impulse control counseling"; if he fulfills the agreement and avoids legal trouble for a year, the charge against him will be dismissed. He was also removed from his role as chairman of a super PAC called Make America Great Again Action following the incident.

== Electoral history ==
=== 1994 ===
Massachusetts House of Representatives, 17th Middlesex, general election, 1994
| Party | Candidate | Votes | % |
|---|---|---|---|
| Democratic | Thomas Golden Jr. | 7,157 | 99.9 |
| Republican | Corey Lewandowski (write-in) | 7 | 0.1 |

=== 2012 ===
Town Treasurer, Windham, election, 2012
| Party | Candidate | Votes | % |
|---|---|---|---|
| Nonpartisan | Robert Skinner | 1,941 | 73 |
| Nonpartisan | Corey Lewandowski | 714 | 27 |
