= David Bossie =

American political activist (born 1965)

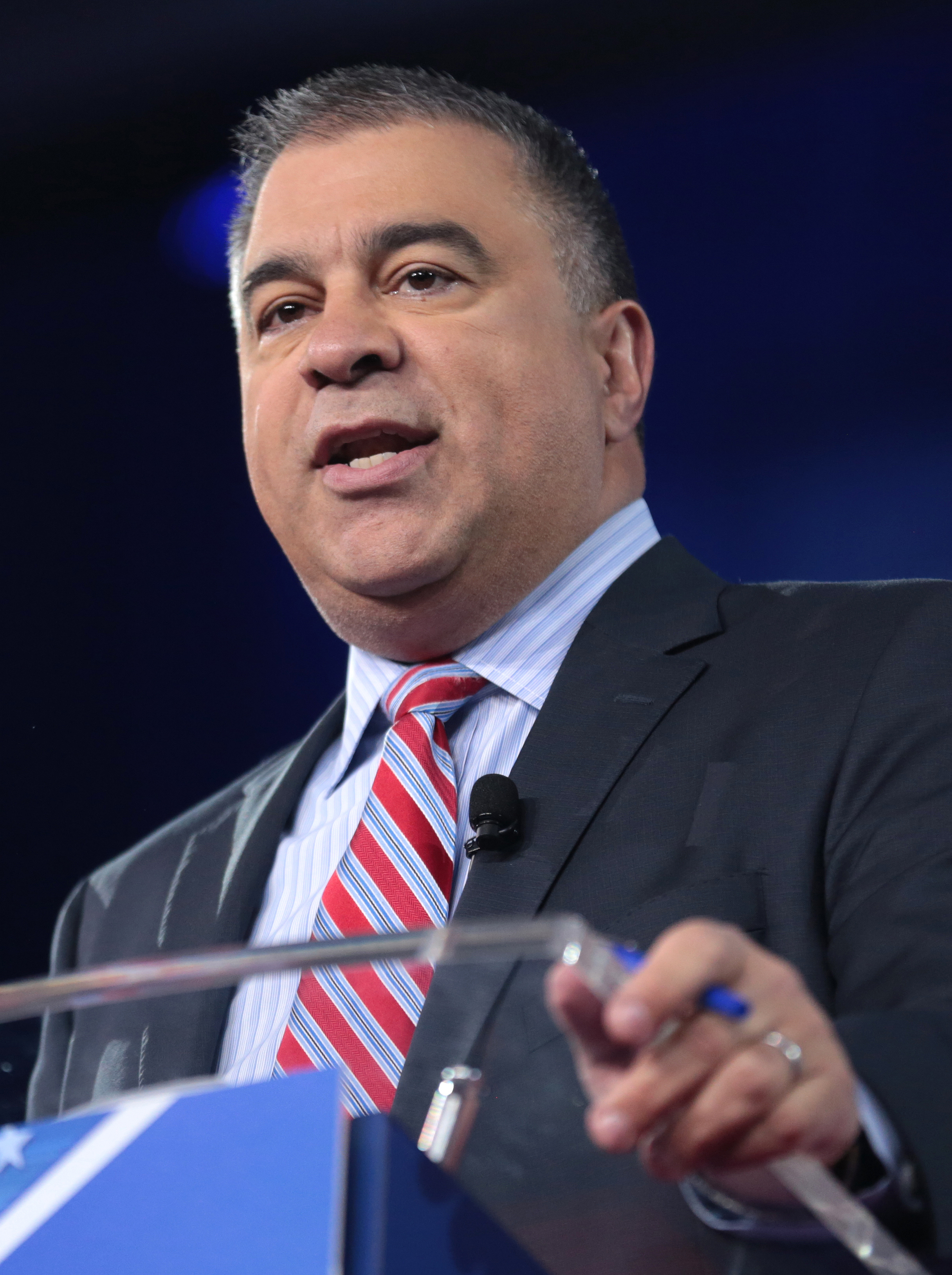
- Bossie at CPAC 2017

Republican National Committeeman from Maryland
- Incumbent
- Assumed office May 14, 2016
- Preceded by: Louis Pope

Personal details
- Born: David Norman Bossie; November 1, 1965 (age 61) Boston, Massachusetts, U.S.
- Party: Republican
- Spouse: Susan
- Children: 4

David Norman Bossie (born November 1, 1965) is an American political activist. Since 2000, he has been president and chairman of conservative advocacy group Citizens United and in 2016, Bossie was the deputy campaign manager to the Donald Trump presidential campaign.

Subsequently, Bossie had a falling-out with the Trump campaign and administration in May 2019 after Axios reported that Bossie had been accused by the Internal Revenue Service of defrauding political donors by funneling their donations to himself through consultants and book sales. In January 2020 he returned to prominent association with the Trump administration as a strategic ally to help contest the impeachment of Donald Trump based on his past familiarity with impeachment battles.

In 1992, Bossie joined Citizens United as a researcher, during which time Citizens United produced many films promoting Republican perspectives and talking points. Later in the 1990s, Bossie had a troubled turn as congressional investigator. Bossie was hired by the chairman of the House Committee on Government Reform and new Oversight in 1997 as chief investigator to look into possible campaign finance abuses by U.S. President Bill Clinton. In May 1998, bipartisan concern mounted over inappropriate redaction of tapes and transcripts of former U.S. Associate AG Webster Hubbell's prison telephone calls omitting some exculpatory passages. Newt Gingrich pressed for Bossie's resignation, which followed shortly thereafter.

In 2010, Bossie produced the American documentary film Generation Zero for Citizens United Productions, written and directed by Steve Bannon, which attributes in some measure the origins of the 2008 financial crisis to moral failings of the Baby Boom generation, in particular their turning away from parental values during the countercultural 1960s. Bossie has written several books attacking Democratic rivals, including John Kerry, Bill Clinton, and Hillary Clinton, as well as a political memoir co-authored with Corey Lewandowski concerning Donald Trump's successful 2016 presidential campaign.

In June 2018, Bossie, a regular guest on Fox News programs, made a statement to a fellow guest which was an insult to African-Americans; he later apologized. Fox News suspended him for two weeks, calling the remarks "deeply offensive and wholly inappropriate".

== Early life ==
Bossie grew up in Massachusetts. He attended Towson State University and the University of Maryland, but dropped out before graduation. When he was 18 years old, he volunteered in Ronald Reagan's reelection campaign.

== Career ==
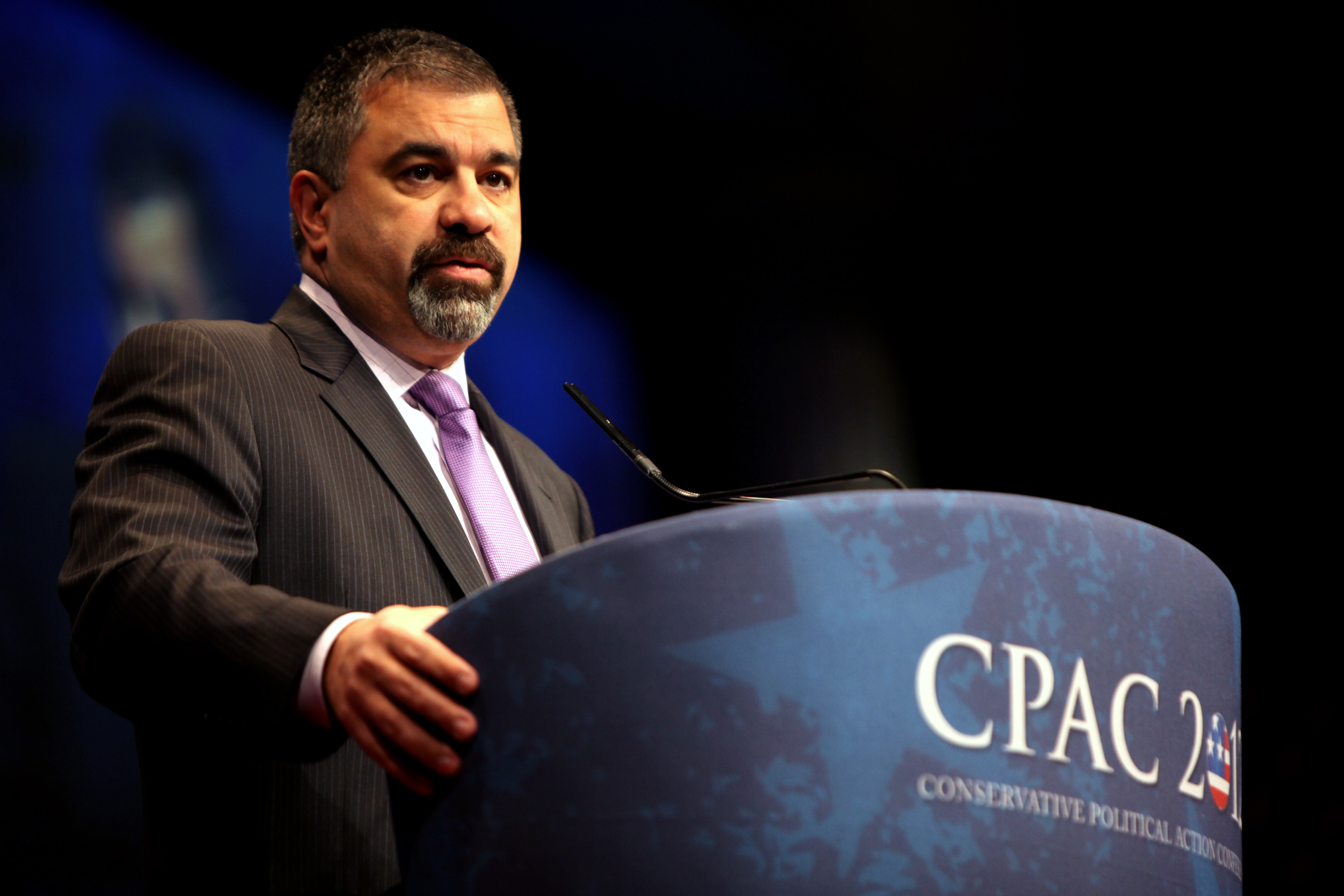
Bossie addressing the 2012 Conservative Political Action Conference (CPAC) in Washington, D.C.

A volunteer firefighter in his youth, Bossie dropped out of university to pursue politics. Bossie was the youth director of Senator Bob Dole's 1988 presidential campaign.

=== Congressional investigator ===
After the Republicans won control of the United States House of Representatives in the 1994 elections, Dan Burton (R-IN) became chairman of the House Committee on Government Reform and new Oversight. In 1997, he hired Bossie as chief investigator to look into possible campaign finance abuses by U.S. President Bill Clinton.

By May 1998, Burton came under intense partisan pressure; even fellow Republicans complained that committee staff had published redacted tapes and transcripts of former United States Associate Attorney General Webster Hubbell's prison telephone calls omitting some exculpatory passages. Speaker of the House Newt Gingrich pressed Burton to seek Bossie's resignation. Shortly thereafter, Burton accepted Bossie's resignation.

=== Citizens United ===
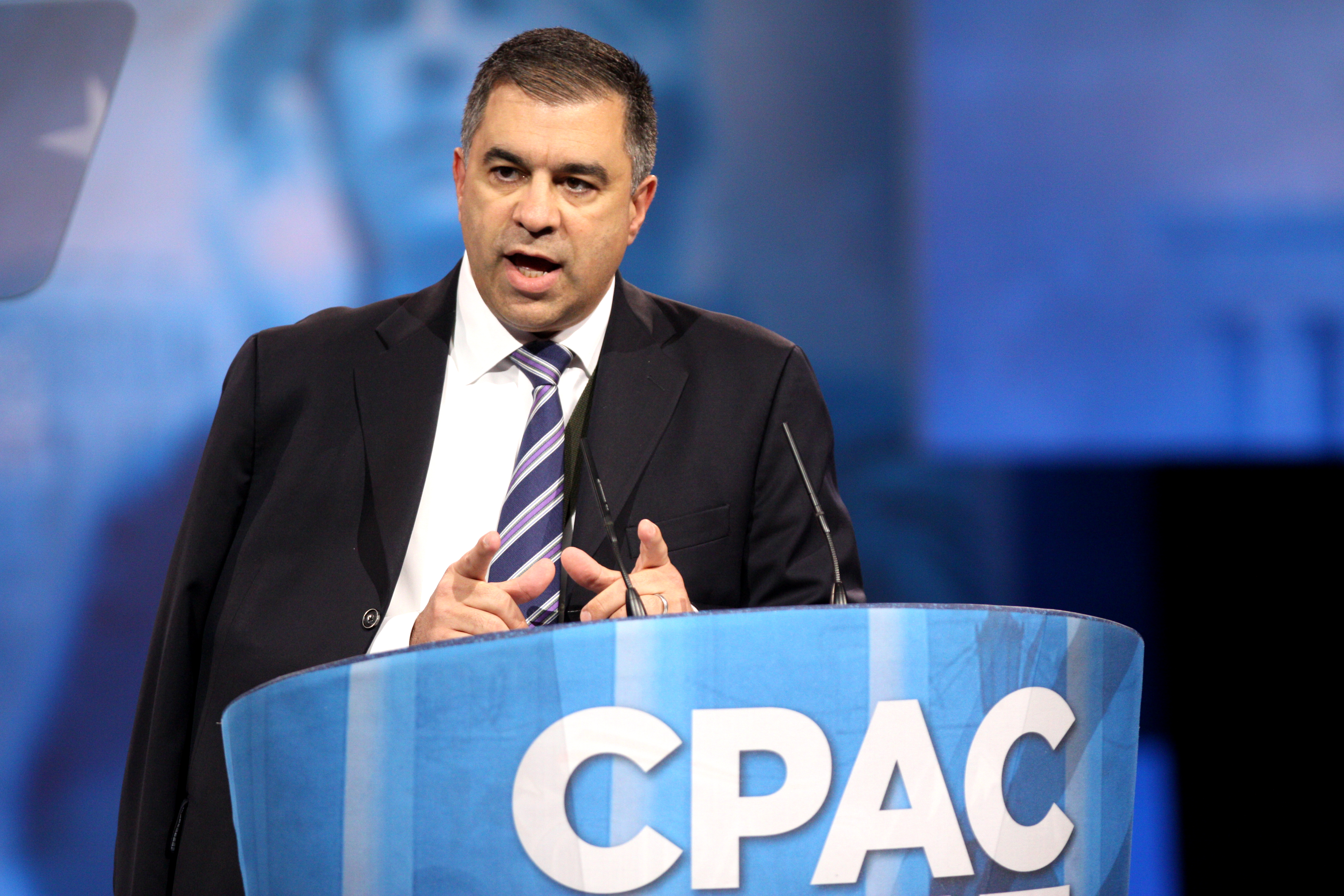
Bossie speaking about Citizens United at the 2013 CPAC in National Harbor, Maryland.

During his tenure at Citizens United, which he had joined as a researcher after Bill Clinton was elected in 1992, the organization focused increasingly on producing film documentaries through its Citizens United Productions division. Their films have included:

- Border War: The Battle Over Illegal Immigration
- Celsius 41.11
- Rediscovering God in America, hosted by Newt and Callista Gingrich
- Hillary: The Movie
- Occupy Unmasked

Citizens United hoped to begin distribution of the feature film Hillary: The Movie in January or February 2008. The Bipartisan Campaign Reform Act of 2002 made that an unlawful electioneering communication. They sued, unsuccessfully, for an injunction to prohibit the Federal Election Commission from enforcement of those provisions of BCRA on First Amendment grounds.

In a 2010 landmark decision, the Supreme Court decided Citizens United v. Federal Election Commission for Citizens United. For-profit corporations and not-for-profit corporations may now advertise and broadcast messages of a political nature without limits on how much they can spend and with few limits on the timing and nature of the messages.

=== Trump presidential campaigns ===
In September 2016, presidential candidate Donald Trump hired Bossie to be his new deputy campaign manager. In November 2020, following the conclusion of the 2020 presidential election, Trump recruited Bossie again to challenge ballot counting in states with tight margins. On November 9, it was reported that Bossie had tested positive for COVID-19. He had attended Trump's Election Night party, as had others who tested positive around the same time, such as Secretary of Housing and Urban Development Ben Carson and White House Chief of Staff Mark Meadows. At this point, Bossie dropped out of the recount effort. In February 2022, Bossie "spearheaded" a Republican National Committee resolution to formally censure Liz Cheney and Adam Kinzinger for their perceived disloyalty to Trump.

== Publications ==
Bossie is the author of The Many Faces of John Kerry (Thomas Nelson, 2004), a hostile look at the Democratic nominee in the 2004 United States presidential election, then-Senator John Kerry. He also wrote Intelligence Failure (Thomas Nelson, 2004), a book alleging that failings on the part of the national security apparatus during the Clinton administration led to the September 11, 2001, terrorist attacks.

Bossie authored the "highly partisan" 2008 publication Hillary: the Politics of Personal Destruction, which is credited with delivering, in 2016, an insistent, long-term campaign theme to Trump of "LOCK HER UP!"

At the 2010 Tea Party movement Convention, Bossie debuted the documentary Generation Zero, focusing on the 2008 financial crisis and insinuating that it was caused by the supposed selfishness of the entire Baby Boomer generation. The documentary, produced by Bossie for Citizens United Productions, had been written and directed by Steve Bannon, and was poorly reviewed by historians as "conceit", "fiction" and "pseudoscience".

In December 2017, Let Trump Be Trump, a memoir co-authored by Bossie and Corey Lewandowski, was published by Center Street. The book chronicles their experiences working on Donald Trump's successful 2016 presidential campaign.

== Personal ==
David and his wife Susan reside in Montgomery County, Maryland with their four children. He has been a volunteer firefighter there since 1998.

Bossie received the Ronald Reagan Award from the Conservative Political Action Conference in 1999. He also was ranked number two in Politico's top 50 most influential people in American politics in 2015, tied with Charlie Spies.

== See also ==
- Timeline of Russian interference in the 2016 United States elections
- Timeline of Russian interference in the 2016 United States elections (July 2016 – election day)
