= Let Trump Be Trump =

2017 memoir about the 2016 Trump presidential campaign

Let Trump Be Trump: The Inside Story of His Rise to the Presidency
- First edition
- Author: Corey Lewandowski, David Bossie
- Language: English
- Subject: Donald Trump's presidential campaign
- Publisher: Center Street
- Publication date: December 5, 2017
- Media type: Print
- Pages: 296
- ISBN: 978-1-5460-8330-6 (Hardcover)

Let Trump Be Trump: The Inside Story of His Rise to the Presidency is a memoir about the successful 2016 presidential campaign of Donald Trump. It was originally published on December 5, 2017, by Center Street, an imprint of Hachette Book Group. It was co-authored by Corey Lewandowski, Trump's first campaign manager, and David Bossie, the head of Citizens United and Trump's final deputy campaign manager. It is the first book about the Trump campaign to be published by the campaign's insiders.

== Content ==
Let Trump Be Trump contains numerous anecdotes from the Trump campaign, including accounts that Trump regularly ate fast food and angrily swore at his aides. Some of these anecdotes, including that Trump preferred to eat two Big Macs, two Filet-o-Fish, and a chocolate milkshake from McDonald's, were revealed on December 2, 2017, when the Washington Post published excerpts of an advance copy of the book. In the book, the authors also wrote that "Sooner or later, everybody who works for Donald Trump will see a side of him that makes you wonder why you took a job with him in the first place". The book also states that Chris Vlasto, the then-executive producer of Good Morning America, called Bossie at 5:01 PM on the night of the 2016 election with early exit polling data. In December 2017, ABC News said that once they learned about the alleged sharing of this data, they asked Vlasto about whether he had done it. The network also said that Vlasto admitted that he had done it, and that they reprimanded him as a result.

== Reviews ==
Maggie Haberman, writing in the New York Times, described Let Trump Be Trump as "...a combination of over-the-top praise for [Lewandowski's and Bossie's] candidate, nostalgic remembrances of glory days and rewarding aides they liked and score-settling with their enemies, particularly Paul Manafort, whose arrival in the campaign started the countdown clock on Mr. Lewandowski's dismissal." She also described the book as "a fairly typical campaign memoir". David Frum, reviewing the book in the Washington Post, described it as "...by turns gullible, dishonest and weirdly careless." The New Republic's Alex Shephard wrote in his review that, "There's nothing really in here of interest to Trump's detractors or his supporters—there's nothing here for readers, in general."

More favorable reviews included one from Jeffrey Lord in the American Spectator. Lord described the book as "A serious 'we were there' history of a candidate and campaign that astonished many and, if one were to listen to the mainstream media, infuriated many more", adding that "a political book can't get much better than this."
