= 2026–27 United States network television schedule (daytime) =

The 2026–27 afternoon network television schedule for the five major English-language commercial broadcast networks in the United States covers the weekday and weekend afternoon hours from September 2026 to August 2027. The schedule is followed by a list per network of returning and cancelled shows from the 2025–26 season.

Affiliates fill time periods not occupied by network programs with local or syndicated programming. PBS, which offers daytime programming through a children's program block (PBS Kids) is not included, as its member television stations have local flexibility over most of their schedules and broadcast times for network shows may vary. Also not included are MyNetworkTV (as the programming service does not offer daytime programs of any kind) and Ion Television (as its schedules is composed mainly of syndicated reruns).

The CW and Fox are not included on the weekday schedule as they only air afternoon programming (in the form of sports content) during weekends.

== Legend ==
- Light blue indicates local programming.
- Chartreuse indicates soap operas.
- Blue-gray indicates news programming.
- Light green indicates sporting events.
- Light teal indicates programs not applicable to the above categorizations.

== Schedule ==
- New series are highlighted in **bold**.
- All times correspond to U.S. Eastern and Pacific Time scheduling (except for some live sports or events). Except where affiliates slot certain programs outside their network-dictated timeslots, subtract one hour for Central, Mountain, Alaska, and Hawaii-Aleutian times.
- Local schedules may differ, as affiliates have the option to pre-empt or delay network programs. Such scheduling may be limited to preemptions caused by local or national breaking news or weather coverage (which may force stations to tape delay certain programs in overnight timeslots or defer them to a co-operated station or digital subchannel in their regular timeslot) and any major sports events scheduled to air in a weekday timeslot (mainly during major holidays). Stations may air shows at other times at their preference.
- All sporting events air live in all time zones in U.S. Eastern time, with local programming by affiliates in western time zones after game completion.

=== Weekdays ===
Network	Noon	12:30 p.m.	1:00 p.m.	1:30 p.m.	2:00 p.m.	2:30 p.m.	3:00 p.m.	3:30 p.m.	4:00 p.m.	4:30 p.m.	5:00 p.m.	5:30 p.m.	6:00 p.m.	6:30 p.m.	7:00 p.m.	7:30 p.m.
ABC	Local and/or syndicated programming		GMA3		General Hospital		Local and/or syndicated programming							ABC World News Tonight	Local and/or syndicated programming	
CBS	Local and/or syndicated programming	The Young and the Restless		The Bold and the Beautiful	Beyond the Gates		Local and/or syndicated programming							CBS Evening News	Local and/or syndicated programming	
NBC	NBC News Daily		Local and/or syndicated programming											NBC Nightly News	Local and/or syndicated programming	

Notes:

- ABC stations have the option of airing General Hospital at 2:00 or 3:00 p.m. Eastern Time, depending on the station's choice of feed.
- ABC stations have the option of airing GMA: The Third Hour anytime between Noon and 2 p.m. Eastern Time, depending on the station's choice of feed.
- Depending on their choice of feed, CBS stations have the option of airing Let's Make a Deal at either 10:00 a.m. or 3:00 p.m. Eastern (airtime adjusted by time zone), and/or The Young and the Restless at 11:00 or 11:30 a.m. local time (in the Central, Mountain, and Pacific time zones).
- Depending on their choice of feed, on Tuesdays, NBC stations have the option of airing primetime NBA on NBC games at 8 p.m. ET/5 p.m. PT and/or 11 p.m. ET/8 p.m. PT. (Therefore, affiliates in the Mountain time zone westward that opt to air the early 8 p.m. ET/5 p.m. PT game may air NBC Nightly News live with the rest of the country, delay it to 7:30 p.m. ET/4:30 p.m. PT or air it after the game, except on, Opening Night, MLK Day and Presidents Day , in which all NBC affiliates will air a tripleheader that day/ night (at 3, 7 and 9:30 p.m. ET/12, 4 and 6:30 p.m. PT on Opening Night, at 8 and 10:30 p.m. ET/5 and 7:30 p.m PT on any week that the network creates a primetime doubleheader during the season, and on MLK Day and Presidents Day 12, 2:30, and 5 p.m. ET/9, 11:30 a.m.,and 2 p.m. PT) which will preempt NBC Nightly News due to game telecasts on Opening Night, MLK Day, Presidents Day, and any night that the network schedules a game an national primetime doubleheader)
- NBC News Daily airs live every hour from noon until 4:00 p.m. Eastern Time, and NBC stations have the option to choose which hour they would like to air.
- NBC Nightly News airs live in all time zones on Monday and Tuesday nights to avoid preemption due to live airings of 2027 NBA playoffs games.

=== Saturday ===
Network		Noon	12:30 p.m.	1:00 p.m.	1:30 p.m.	2:00 p.m.	2:30 p.m.	3:00 p.m.	3:30 p.m.	4:00 p.m.	4:30 p.m.	5:00 p.m.	5:30 p.m.	6:00 p.m.	6:30 p.m.	7:00 p.m.	7:30 p.m.
ABC	Fall	College Football on ABC														College Football Scoreboard	Saturday Night Football (continued to game completion)
ABC	Winter	ABC Hockey Saturday Pregame	ABC Hockey Saturday											Local and/or syndicated programming	ABC World News Tonight	Local and/or syndicated programming	
ABC	Spring	Local and/or syndicated programming	WNBA Countdown	WNBA on ABC								Local and/or syndicated programming			ABC World News Tonight	Local and/or syndicated programming	
ABC	Summer	ESPN on ABC sports programming										Local and/or syndicated programming			ABC World News Tonight	Local and/or syndicated programming	
CBS	Fall	Local, syndicated and/or CBS Sports programming					CBS College Football Kickoff	College Football Today	College Football on CBS							CBS College Football Postgame	Local and/or syndicated programming
CBS	Winter	College Basketball on CBS												Local and/or syndicated programming	CBS Weekend News	Local and/or syndicated programming	
CBS	Spring	Local, syndicated and/or CBS Sports programming						PGA Tour on CBS						Local and/or syndicated programming	CBS Weekend News	Local and/or syndicated programming	
CBS	Summer	Big3 on CBS						PGA Tour on CBS						Local and/or syndicated programming	CBS Weekend News	Local and/or syndicated programming	WNBA Tip off show
The CW	Fall	CW Football Saturday															
The CW	Winter	CW Courtside Saturday									NASCAR Countdown Live	NASCAR on The CW					
The CW	Spring	Local, Syndicated and/or CW Sports programming								NASCAR Countdown Live	NASCAR on The CW					Local and/or syndicated programming	
Fox	Fall	Fox College Football (continued to game completion)															
Fox	Winter	Fox College Hoops (continued to game completion)															
Fox	Spring	Local, syndicated and/or Fox Sports programming														Baseball Night in America (continued until game completion)	
Fox	Summer	Local, syndicated and/or Fox Sports programming						Fox Saratoga Saturday						Local and/or syndicated programming		Baseball Night in America (continued until game completion)	
NBC	Fall	Local and/or syndicated programming	Premier League on NBC				NBC Sports programming									College Countdown	College Football on NBC (continued to game completion)
NBC	Winter	Local and/or syndicated programming	Premier League on NBC				Golf Channel on NBC							Local and/or syndicated programming	NBC Nightly News	Local and/or syndicated programming	
NBC	Spring	Local and/or syndicated programming	Premier League on NBC				Premier League Goal Zone	NBC Sports programming						Local and/or syndicated programming	NBC Nightly News	Local and/or syndicated programming	
NBC	Summer	NBC Sports programming												Local and/or syndicated programming	NBC Nightly News	Local and/or syndicated programming	

Notes:

- To comply with FCC educational programming regulations, stations may defer certain programs featured in their respective network's E/I program blocks to determined weekend late morning or afternoon time periods if a sporting event is not scheduled in the timeslot or in place of paid programming that would otherwise be scheduled.
- Airtimes of sporting events may vary depending on the offerings scheduled for that weekend.
- NBC Nightly News will only air in the Eastern and Central time zones during fall if Notre Dame Football on NBC airs a 3:30 p.m. ET game. All other time zones will either air the program live (if available) or otherwise preempted due to College Football on NBC.
- CBS Weekend News is preempted in the Eastern and Central time zones when College Football on CBS airs a 3:30 p.m. ET game. All other time zones air the program.

=== Sunday ===
Network		Noon	12:30 p.m.	1:00 p.m.	1:30 p.m.	2:00 p.m.	2:30 p.m.	3:00 p.m.	3:30 p.m.	4:00 p.m.	4:30 p.m.	5:00 p.m.	5:30 p.m.	6:00 p.m.	6:30 p.m.
ABC	Fall	Local, syndicated and/or ESPN on ABC sports programming						WNBA on ABC				Local and/or syndicated programming			ABC World News Tonight
ABC	Winter	Local and/or syndicated programming	NBA Countdown	NBA Sunday Showcase										Local and/or syndicated programming	ABC World News Tonight
ABC	Spring	ESPN on ABC sports programming										Local and/or syndicated programming			ABC World News Tonight
ABC	Summer	Local, syndicated and/or ESPN on ABC sports programming					WNBA Countdown	WNBA on ABC				Local and/or syndicated programming			ABC World News Tonight
CBS	Fall	The NFL Today		NFL on CBS (continued until game completion)											
CBS	Winter	College Basketball on CBS												Local and/or syndicated programming	CBS Weekend News
CBS	Spring	Local, CBS Sports and/or syndicated programming						PGA Tour on CBS						Local and/or syndicated programming	CBS Weekend News
CBS	Summer	Big3 on CBS						PGA Tour on CBS						Local and/or syndicated programming	CBS Weekend News
The CW	Fall	Local, syndicated and/or CW Sports programming						PBR Team Series on The CW					Local and/or syndicated programming		
The CW	Winter	Local, syndicated and/or CW Sports programming				CW Courtside Saturday				PBA Tour on The CW				Local and/or syndicated programming	
The CW	Spring	Local, syndicated and/or CW Sports programming								AVP Volleyball on The CW				Local and/or syndicated programming	
Fox	Fall	Fox NFL Sunday		Fox NFL (continued to game completion)											
Fox	Winter	Local, syndicated and/or Fox Sports programming						Fox Sports programming							
Fox	Spring	Local, syndicated and/or Fox Sports programming								UFL on Fox					
Fox	Summer	Local, syndicated and/or Fox Sports programming													
NBC	Fall	Local and/or syndicated programming		NASCAR America		NASCAR on NBC								Local and/or syndicated programming	NBC Nightly News
NBC	Winter	NBC Sports programming					Golf Channel on NBC							Local and/or syndicated programming	NBC Nightly News
NBC	Spring	NBC Sports programming												Local and/or syndicated programming	NBC Nightly News
NBC	Summer	NBC Sports programming						WNBA on NBC						Local and/or syndicated programming	NBC Nightly News

Notes:

- To comply with FCC educational programming regulations, stations may defer certain programs featured in their respective network's E/I program blocks to determined weekend late morning or afternoon time periods if a sporting event is not scheduled in the timeslot or in place of paid programming that would otherwise be scheduled.
- Airtimes of sporting events may vary depending on the offerings scheduled for that weekend.
- When CBS and/or Fox offer an early single NFL game, a post-game show airs after the game from 4:30–5:00 p.m. ET (the length of which may vary depending on the timing of the early game's conclusion) with local, syndicated or non-NFL sports programming airing after from 5:00–7:00 p.m. ET. Meanwhile, when CBS and/or Fox offer a late single NFL game, local, syndicated or non-NFL sports programming airs from 1:00–4:00 p.m. ET/10:00 a.m.–1:00 p.m. PT.
- CBS and Fox stations in the Pacific Time Zone receiving an NFL single game, must air a late single game, if possible.
- ABC, CBS and/or NBC stations may air their corresponding network's early evening newscast at 6:00 or 6:30 p.m. ET and PT/5:00 or 5:30 p.m. CT/MT, depending on the station's choice of feed.
- NBC Nightly News airs live in all time zones year-round to avoid pre-emption due to the live airings of NBC Sunday Night Football, NBC Sunday Night Basketball and NBC Sunday Night Baseball, respectively.
- CBS Weekend News is preempted on the Eastern and Central time zones when NFL on CBS airs late NFL games. All other time zones air the program.

== By network ==
=== ABC ===
Returning series:

- ABC News
  - ABC World News Tonight
  - GMA3: What You Need To Know
- ESPN on ABC
  - College Football on ABC
  - College Football Scoreboard
  - Saturday Night Football
  - WNBA on ABC
  - ABC Hockey Saturday
  - NBA Countdown
  - NBA Sunday Showcase
- General Hospital

=== CBS ===
Returning series:

- Beyond the Gates
- The Bold and the Beautiful
- CBS Evening News
- CBS Sports
  - College Football on CBS
  - College Football Today
  - NFL on CBS
  - The NFL Today
  - PGA Tour on CBS
  - College Basketball on CBS
- The Young and the Restless

=== The CW ===
Returning series:

- CW Sports
  - ACC on The CW
  - CW Football Saturday
  - Pac-12 College Football on The CW
  - NASCAR Countdown Live
  - NASCAR on The CW
  - CW Courtside Saturday
  - Grand Slam Track

=== Fox ===
Returning series:

- Fox Sports
  - Fox College Football
  - Fox NFL
  - Fox NFL Sunday
  - Fox College Hoops
  - Baseball Night in America
  - UFL on Fox

=== NBC ===
Returning series:

- NBC News
  - NBC News Daily
  - NBC Nightly News
- NBC Sports
  - College Football on NBC
  - College Countdown
  - NASCAR America
  - NASCAR on NBC
  - Premier League on NBC

== See also ==
- 2026–27 United States network television schedule (prime-time)
- 2026–27 United States network television schedule (morning)
- 2026–27 United States network television schedule (late night)
- 2026–27 United States network television schedule (overnight)
