= Lee Stranahan =

American journalist and broadcaster

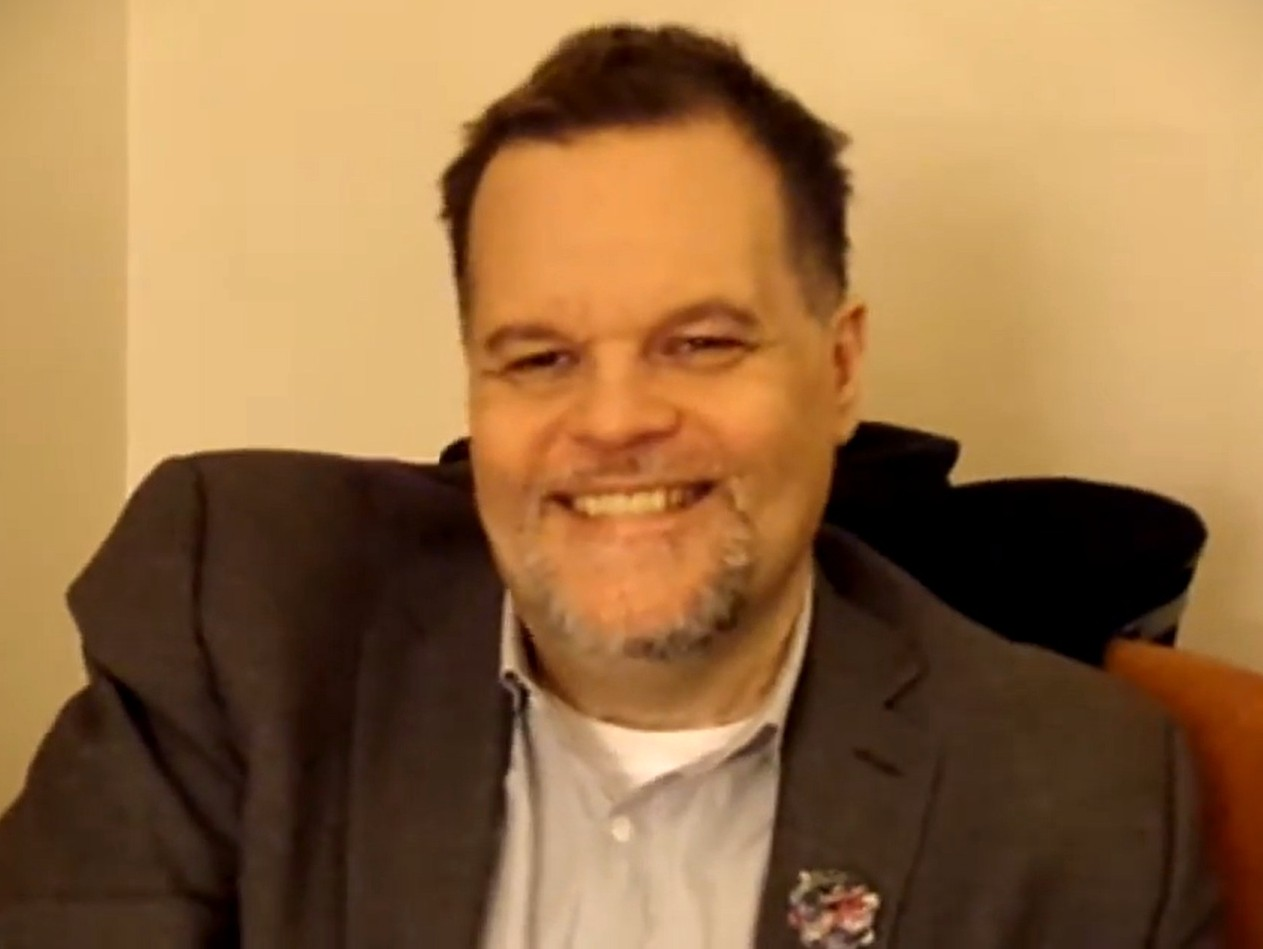
Stranahan in 2018

Lee Stranahan is an American writer who worked for Sputnik, a Russian government-controlled news agency. He previously worked for Breitbart News, and has written for The Huffington Post and Daily Kos. He has worked as a television producer, illustrator, and erotic photographer.

== Media career ==
For some years, Stranahan worked as a television producer and graphic illustrator in Los Angeles, California. He had a sideline in erotic photography.

Stranahan's career change originated during the 2007–08 Writers Guild of America strike. During that time, he posted parody political advertisements on YouTube, including one that poked fun at Rudy Giuliani and Mitt Romney. Stranahan later said the videos led to a job writing political comedy for The Huffington Post. In March 2008, Stranahan was banned from making posts on Daily Kos after his comments about the John Edwards extramarital affair.

=== Breitbart News ===
Stranahan met Andrew Breitbart while working on assignment in 2010. The two men soon became friends, and Breitbart converted Stranahan to conservatism, became his mentor, and hired him to work at Breitbart News. Stranahan has also described Steve Bannon, the former executive chairman of Breitbart News, as being his mentor.

In 2012, Stranahan received threats of physical violence after a screening of Occupy Unmasked. In 2013, he was an active critic of Deric Lostutter's "KYAnonymous campaign". He left Breitbart News in 2013 and was re-hired. In 2014, he was fired from Breitbart News on what he disputed as false allegations. In July 2016, Stranahan was arrested while covering a protest over the death of Alton Sterling in Baton Rouge, Louisiana.

During the 2016 US presidential election, while working for Breitbart News, Stranahan communicated with Russian hackers via Guccifer 2.0 to leak illicitly obtained material about the Democratic Party. Stranahan claimed on Twitter in March 2017 that he had introduced Guccifer 2.0 to Roger Stone. Stranahan, managed to obtain material from Guccifer 2.0 about Black Lives Matter. Stone and Stranahan, who was then assisting him, disputed that Guccifer 2.0 was a front for Russia during the 2016 election. An article by Stone on this issue appeared on Breitbart News; Stranahan has said he was the piece's ghost writer. In July 2018, Special Counsel Robert Mueller indicted 12 Russian agents and described Guccifer 2.0 as a Russian government front. Mueller's indictment referred to an unnamed reporter who had conferred with the Russians about the timing of a leak; Stranahan has confirmed that he was the journalist concerned. He has said he was the reporter mentioned over the theft of material concerning Black Lives Matter.

In April 2017, Stranahan announced he had resigned from his position at Breitbart News, the third time he had either left or been fired from the organization. He said he quit in protest after the site's Washington editor prevented him from covering the White House. Stranahan had been attending the briefings for several weeks while identifying himself as a Breitbart reporter and trying to ask White House Press Secretary Sean Spicer a question about CrowdStrike, the cybersecurity technology company that handled the Democratic National Committee's servers during the 2016 election. A few months later, Stranahan was highly critical of the Breitbart editor-in-chief, Alex Marlow, in part for perceived treachery in accepting the Russian hack happened during the 2016 presidential election.

=== Sputnik News ===
After accepting an approach from Radio Sputnik, Stranahan announced in April 2017 that he was the co-host of a new radio show for the radio station called Fault Lines with Nixon and Stranahan co-hosted with Garland Nixon. Stranahan, the station's only contributor to identify himself as a supporter of President Donald Trump, told The Washington Post that he wanted to work for Sputnik because so many Americans inaccurately believe Russia is their country's enemy. He said he "doesn't have any qualms" with being "on the Russian payroll" and that the content of his show was not restricted in any way. Caroline Lester in The New Republic in 2018 speculated that "Russian authorities may not need to exercise direct editorial control to achieve their ends" referring to the contributors it hires, such as Stranahan and John Kiriakou.

During the 2022 Russian invasion of Ukraine, Stranahan shared a video suggesting Ukraine was faking war deaths with "crisis actors". CNN said it was "fake" and Twitter removed it as a violation of its platform's rules.

He left Sputnik in February 2024.

== Filmography ==
- 2012 — Occupy Unmasked, as Journalist
