= 2026–27 United States network television schedule (overnight) =

The 2026–27 network overnight television schedule for the three major English-language commercial broadcast networks in the United States covers the overnight hours from September 2026 to August 2027. The schedule is followed by a list per network of returning series, new series, and series canceled after the 2025–26 television season.

Weekend schedules are not included as none of the major networks uniformly offer any network late night programming on Friday and Saturday overnights year-round; NBC, ABC and CBS only air overnight programming on weekdays (although NBC does offer its affiliates the option of carrying same-day rebroadcasts of NBC News-produced programs Sunday–Friday, and LXTV-produced lifestyle programs on Friday and Saturday overnights; see notes below).

PBS is not included at all, as its member television stations have local flexibility over most of their schedules and broadcast times for network shows may vary. (Member stations may additionally opt to utilize the PBS Satellite Service to fill overnight airtime.) Fox, The CW, and MyNetworkTV are not included because none of the networks/programming services offers overnight programs of any kind outside of sports overruns.

== Legend ==
- Light blue indicates local programming.
- Blue-gray indicates news programming.
- Light teal indicates programs not applicable to the above categorizations.
- Light yellow indicates the current schedule.

== Schedule ==
- New series are highlighted in **bold**.
- All times correspond to U.S. Eastern and Pacific Time scheduling (except for some live events). Except where affiliates slot certain programs outside their network-dictated timeslots, subtract one hour for Central, Mountain, Alaska, and Hawaii–Aleutian times.
- Local schedules may differ, as affiliates have the option to pre-empt or delay network programs, and fill timeslots not allocated to network programs with local, syndicated, or paid programming at their discretion. Such scheduling may be limited to preemptions caused by local or national breaking news or weather coverage (which may force stations to tape delay certain programs in overnight timeslots or defer them to a co-operated station or a digital subchannel in their regular timeslot). Stations may air shows at other times at their preference.

=== Weeknights ===
Network	2:00 a.m.	2:30 a.m.	3:00 a.m.	3:30 a.m.	4:00 a.m.	4:30 a.m.	5:00 a.m.	5:30 a.m.
ABC	World News Now		Local programming	Good Morning America First Look	Local programming			
CBS	CBS News Roundup		Local programming		CBS News Mornings	Local programming		
NBC	Local programming			Early Today	Local programming			

=== Notes ===
- ABC, NBC and CBS offer their overnight and early morning newscasts via a looping feed (usually running as late as 10:00 a.m. Pacific Time) to accommodate local scheduling in the westernmost contiguous time zones or for use a filler programming for stations that do not offer a local morning newscast; some stations without a morning newscast may air syndicated or time-lease programs instead of the full newscast loop.
- NBC provides a rebroadcast of NBC News Now's Top Story with Tom Llamas (on weeknights), Meet the Press (on Sunday overnights) and/or a 90-minute block of LXTV-produced programs (1st Look, Open House and Open House NYC) (on Friday and Saturday overnights) on select stations (excluding the network's O&Os), with scheduling and local clearance varying by affiliate.

== By network ==
=== ABC ===
Returning series:

- ABC World News Now
- Good Morning America First Look

=== CBS ===
Returning series:

- CBS News Mornings
- CBS News Roundup

=== NBC ===
Returning series:

- Early Today

== See also ==
- 2026–27 United States network television schedule (prime-time)
- 2026–27 United States network television schedule (morning)
- 2026–27 United States network television schedule (daytime)
- 2026–27 United States network television schedule (late night)
