= Occupy Unmasked =

- Directed by: Steve Bannon
- Written by: Steve Bannon
- Produced by: David Bossie
- Starring: Andrew Breitbart; Brandon Darby; David Horowitz; Lee Stranahan
- Cinematography: Kasey Kirby
- Edited by: Kasey Kirby
- Music by: David Cebert
- Production company: Citizens United Productions
- Distributed by: Magnolia Pictures
- Release date: September 21, 2012
- Country: United States
- Language: English
- Box office: $40,952

Occupy Unmasked is a 2012 American documentary film directed by Steve Bannon and produced by David Bossie, which is critical of the Occupy movement and was produced by Citizens United Productions.

The documentary was released in limited theaters on September 21, 2012, distributed by Mark Cuban's Magnolia Pictures. Cuban stated "I don't have any politics" and that his company released the documentary solely "because we believe there is an audience for it" before the 2012 U.S. Presidential election.

== Synopsis ==
The film takes a critical look at the Occupy movement. Andrew Breitbart and producer Stephen Bannon contend that the Occupy movement is sinister, violent, and organized with the purpose of destroying American capitalism and tarnishing the image of New York entrepreneurs. The film also discusses allegations of rape, drug use, and property destruction at the Occupy encampments.

== Reception ==
Writing in The Nation, Michael Tracey allows that it would be possible to sensibly criticize some aspects of the Occupy Movement, but nonetheless characterizes Occupy Unmasked as "total fantasy" and "a deranged hodge-podge of bizarre memes, wild dot-connecting and unadulterated fury." Reviews from right-leaning outlets were more positive, with Perry Chiaramonte of Fox News declaring that the "explosive" documentary raises many important questions about the roots and motivations of the Occupy movement, but fails to conclusively link the protests to the Obama administration.
