= George Gigicos =

American campaign consultant

White House Director of Scheduling and Advance
- In office January 20, 2017 – July 31, 2017
- President: Donald Trump

Personal details
- Party: Republican
- Education: Birmingham–Southern College

George Dean Gigicos is an American campaign consultant who specializes in advance representation for Republican politicians. He served as White House Scheduling and Advance Director from the inauguration of Donald Trump until July 31, 2017.

== Early life and education ==
Gigicos is of Greek descent and has ancestry from Corinth. He studied at Birmingham–Southern College in Alabama, graduating in 1990.

== Career ==
Gigicos worked in advance planning for the United States Department of the Treasury under President George H. W. Bush and later worked as an event planner at the Orange County Convention Center in Florida. He founded a communications firm known as the Telion Corporation in 1999, and also worked for the Republican campaigns of George W. Bush, John McCain, and Mitt Romney.

=== Trump Administration ===
In December 2016, Politico reported that Gigicos was one of Trump's campaign staffers being considered for a staff role in the Trump administration. The site reported that Gigicos was likely to be appointed as the director of White House advance. Trump appointed him as Deputy Assistant to the President and Director of Advance on January 5, 2017. He served in the Trump Administration until July 31, 2017.
