= Chris Stirewalt =

American political news commentator

- Born: Wheeling, West Virginia, U.S.
- Education: Hampden-Sydney College
- Occupation: Political news commentator

Christopher W. Stirewalt is an American political analyst who is the politics editor for NewsNation and is a contributing editor for The Dispatch. Previously he had worked for the Fox News Channel, which he joined in July 2010. He authored and hosted Fox News Halftime Report newsletter and co-hosted the podcast Perino & Stirewalt: I'll Tell You What with Dana Perino.

== Life and career ==
Chris Stirewalt, a Wheeling, West Virginia, native, was a 1993 graduate of the Linsly School. He began his journalism career at age 17 writing baseball box scores for The Wheeling Intelligencer. A 1997 graduate of Hampden-Sydney College in Virginia, he later served as politics editor at the Charleston Daily Mail and West Virginia Media.

He co-hosted the podcast "Perino & Stirewalt: I'll Tell You What" from 2016 to 2020. Stirewalt frequently appeared on Fox News programs. His role involved serving as the network's "main on-air analyst of polls and voting trends." Stirewalt hosted the weekly Power Play show on Fox.

Fox News fired Stirewalt in January 2021. In February 2021, Stirewalt joined The Dispatch as a contributing editor.

On May 24, 2022, Stirewalt joined NewsNation as its political editor. On January 18, 2024, NewsNation announced that Stirewalt would host a new Sunday public affairs program The Hill Sunday which debuted on March 3, 2024.

== 2020 presidential election ==
Arnon Mishkin, Fox News decision desk chief for the 2020 presidential election, called the state of Arizona and its 11 electoral votes to Democratic presidential candidate Joe Biden at 11:20 p.m. Eastern time on election night, November 3, 2020. The Associated Press, who collaborated with Fox on a voter analysis survey that was used to determine the election results, seconded the call of Arizona for Biden.

Bill Hemmer, standing at the Fox News election map, was caught by surprise when Arizona "flipped to blue". "What is happening here? Why is Arizona blue?" he asked. "Did we just call it? Did we just make a call in Arizona?" "OK, time out. This is a big development," commented co-anchor Bret Baier, adding "Biden picking up Arizona changes the . . math."

Stirewalt quickly came onscreen to defend the network's decision. "How can you call Arizona, but we can't call Ohio?" Baier asked him. "Because the races are very different," he replied, explaining that vote margins were too great in Arizona for the Republican candidate to overcome. As for Ohio, Stirewalt said, "There is just too much vote out, and there's too much potentially heavily Democratic mail vote that may flop in at the end to get too froggy right now with Ohio." He assured viewers that "We're going to be careful, cautious, and earnest."

"Arizona is doing just what we expected it to do and we remain serene and pristine," Stirewalt later said. He dismissed voter fraud claims from Republicans, saying, "Lawsuits, schmawsuits — we haven't seen any evidence yet that there's anything wrong." Expressing pride in "being first to project that Joe Biden would win Arizona, and very happy to defend that call in the face of a public backlash egged on by former President Trump," in a Los Angeles Times op-ed, Stirewalt stated that: "Being right and beating the competition is no act of heroism; it's just meeting the job description of the work I love." He emphasized in a Vanity Fair interview that he was "not responsible" personally for the call; instead he credited "an awesome team of fabulous nerds" at the Fox's Decision Desk HQ and Fox News editor at the time, Bill Sammon. Stirewalt saw nothing "out of the ordinary" when his team made the Arizona announcement on election night. In hindsight, he realized the impact as "effective in defeating Trump's attempt to disrupt the election––to steal an election, because yes, the narrative was broken."

"We were kind of out there by ourselves, and through that process, we became a focus of all of this rage, all of this anger," Stirewalt adds of the impact of the early call.

"Chris Stirewalt's leaving had nothing to do with the correct Arizona call by the Fox decision desk," Rupert Murdoch stated in an email to The Washington Post, rather Murdoch was concerned about "Stirewalt's on-air manner, which he perceived as overly casual for a discussion of the election results." Though respected in the Fox newsroom, analysis of "ratings on a minute-by-minute basis" indicated viewership flattening or falling during Stirewalt's frequent appearances.

== Books ==
Stirewalt's first book, Every Man a King: A Short, Colorful History of American Populists, was published in September 2018 by Twelve. In it he writes about Andrew Jackson, William Jennings Bryan, Theodore Roosevelt, Huey Long, George Wallace, Pat Buchanan, and H. Ross Perot.

He is the author of the book, Broken News: Why the Media Rage Machine Divides America and How to Fight Back, published by Hachette imprint Center Street in August 2022.
