= Fahrenhype 9/11 =

FahrenHYPE 9/11
- A promotional poster.
- Directed by: Alan Peterson
- Written by: Eileen McGann; Dick Morris; Lee Troxler
- Produced by: Michael R. Fox; Steve Haugen; Jeff Hays; Dave Sapp; Lee Troxler
- Starring: Ron Silver; Dick Morris
- Narrated by: Ron Silver
- Cinematography: Doug Monroe; Dave Sapp
- Edited by: Michael R. Fox; Lee Troxler
- Distributed by: Trinity Home Entertainment; Overstock.com
- Release date: October 5, 2004
- Running time: 80 minutes
- Country: United States
- Language: English

Fahrenhype 9/11 (stylized FahrenHYPE 9/11) is a 2004 documentary video made in response to Michael Moore's documentary Fahrenheit 9/11. Part of a large group of documentaries that began appearing in the mid-2000s as improved technology allowed anyone to quickly and affordably create movies, the video was created in 28 days and was narrated by Ron Silver. Dick Morris (who also receives a co-writing credit), appears frequently, and features interviews with various political figures, including David Frum, Georgia Democratic Senator Zell Miller, social and political commentator Ann Coulter, and former Democratic New York City mayor Ed Koch.

The movie was released with a companion book, on October 5, 2004, the same day that Fahrenheit 9/11 was released on home video.

== Reviews and response ==
The documentary received four reviews at Rotten Tomatoes. Film reviewer Robert Koehler described the film in Variety as "a broadside," and noted that "it's vastly inferior in content and style to its Moore produced counterpart." Jim Emerson reviewed the video as well, saying that the documentary "isn't exactly a thorough or level-headed piece of reasoning or investigative journalism; it's every bit the hot-headed political advertisement that Moore's film was, just a lot less funny."

After receiving complaints about fairness, a library in San Diego postponed and moved a free showing of Moore's Fahrenheit 9/11 film to a location where it could be shown along with this video. Controversy was generated in Chicago when a student from the Northwestern University Young Republicans had publicized an election night party and showing of the documentary in the bar area of a theater, after the offer was rescinded by theater management. An after school showing of Moore's Fahrenheit 9/11 requested by North Sutton, New Hampshire high school students was cancelled after several conservative parents complained. The high school superintendent told the teachers to, "in the interests of balance", not show Fahrenheit 9/11 without also showing Fahrenhype.

== See also ==
- Fahrenheit 9/11 controversies
