= Liberty Film Festival =

Film festival

- Location: Los Angeles, USA
- Language: International
- Website: Liberty Film Festival, hosted at LFM

The Liberty Film Festival was an American film festival founded by independent filmmakers Jason Apuzzo and Govindini Murty in July 2004 and was active until 2008, but the efforts of the organization continue via Libertas Film Magazine.

== History ==
Founded in July 2004 by American independent filmmakers Jason Apuzzo and Govindini Murty, the Liberty Film Festival took place primarily in West Hollywood, CA and was active between 2004 and 2008. The LFF screened over 80 films, of which approximately fifty were premieres and thirty achieved distribution, with events attracting over 12,000 attendees. During its active years the LFF also hosted tributes to directors Cecil B. DeMille, Raoul Walsh, John Ford, and Fritz Lang, actors John Wayne, Ronald Reagan, and Charlton Heston. Festival speakers included Frank Price, former President of Columbia Pictures and Universal Studios, Joel Surnow, Creator and Executive Producer of the Emmy Award-winning TV series 24, actors Robert Davi (License to Kill) and Morgan Brittany (Melrose Place), writer/director David Zucker (Airplane!), writer/director Cyrus Nowrasteh (ABC's The Path to 9/11), film critics Richard Schickel and Michael Medved, screenwriter Paul Guay (Liar Liar), Kurdish-Iraqi director and human rights activist Jano Rosebiani (Jiyan), and a number of other film and media professionals.

The Liberty Film Festival received extensive media coverage in: the LA Times, The New York Times, Washington Post, USA Today, Variety, and Hollywood Reporter; the LFF was also featured numerous times on ABC, CNN, Fox News, Fox Business, MSNBC, AMC, C-SPAN, NPR, and also on the UK’s BBC, France's Canal Plus, Japan's NHK, Italy's RAI, and Dutch national TV.

== Libertas Film Magazine ==
The Liberty Film Festival has continued on in the form of its on-line film magazine Libertas, founded in January 2005 by Jason Apuzzo and Govindini Murty. LA Times film columnist Patrick Goldstein has called Libertas "a must read", and New York Times film critic A.O. Scott has called Libertas “insightful as well as provocative.” In 2007, the site was voted one of the top three culture blogs on the internet. Libertas went on hiatus in the summer of 2008, returning in 2010 as Libertas Film Magazine (LFM). In recent years, Libertas has focused its coverage increasingly on independent film festivals, and such progressive themes as women's rights, human rights, science, and technology.
