= Citizens United (organization) =

American conservative advocacy group

- Formation: November 1988; 38 years ago
- Type: 501(c)(4) non-profit organization
- Tax ID no.: 91-1433368
- Headquarters: Washington, D.C.
- President, Chairman: David Bossie
- Website: citizensunited.org

Citizens United is an American conservative nonprofit organization founded in 1988. In 2010, the organization won a U.S. Supreme Court case known as Citizens United v. FEC. The Court ruled that corporations and unions could not be prohibited from making independent expenditures in federal elections, citing First Amendment protections of free speech. As of 2025, the organization's president and chairman is David Bossie.

== Overview ==
Citizens United's stated mission is to restore the United States government to "citizens' control, through a combination of education, advocacy, and grass-roots organization" seeking to "reassert the traditional American values of limited government, freedom of enterprise, strong families, and national sovereignty and security." Citizens United is a conservative political advocacy group organized under Section 501(c)4 of the federal tax code, meaning that donations are not tax deductible. To fulfill this mission, Citizens United produces television commercials, web advertisements, and documentary films. CU film Perfect Valor was named Best Documentary at the GI Film Festival, and Ronald Reagan: Rendezvous with Destiny also received a Remi Award at the WorldFest-Houston International Film Festival.

David Bossie has been its president since 2000. In 2016, he took a leave of absence to be deputy campaign manager of Donald Trump's campaign for President of the United States. The offices of the organization are on Pennsylvania Avenue in the Capitol Hill area of Washington, D.C.

== Leadership ==
The current president, David Bossie, has been president since he served as the chief investigator into then President Bill Clinton's possible abuse of finances in 1997, and was later the deputy campaign manager for Donald Trump's presidential campaign in 2016. In 2020, he served in executive positions for President Donald Trump's and Israeli Prime Minister Benjamin Netanyahu's reelection campaigns.

== History ==
The political action committee, Citizens United, was founded in 1988 by Floyd Brown, a longtime Washington political consultant. The group promotes free enterprise, socially conservative causes and candidates who advance their mission.

== Positions and advocacy ==
Citizens United is known for its support of conservatives in politics. The group produced a television advertisement that reveals several legislative actions taken by John McCain, which aired on Fox News Channel. On October 2, 2006, in reaction to revelations of a cover-up of inappropriate communications between Republican Congressman Mark Foley and House pages, Citizens United president David Bossie called on Dennis Hastert to resign over his role in covering up the scandal.

The group sued and lost a case against New York Attorney General Eric Schneiderman over Schneiderman's demand that it disclose all its donors.

In 1999, Citizens United wrote and funded a VHS tape produced by The Strategy Group on the Clinton administration's relationship with Chinese businessmen called "The Truth Revealed... Confidential Report: Bill Clinton, Al Gore and the Communist Chinese Connection". It is written and hosted by then company president, Floyd G. Brown.

Citizens United campaigned against Michael Moore's 2004 film Fahrenheit 9/11, advocating for government limits on how much advertising the film received. It also made advertisements attacking the film, and when the Federal Election Commission held that Moore's film was not a violation of the Federal Election Campaign Act, Citizens United produced its own rebuttal film called Celsius 41.11. However, the FEC held that paying to air Celsius 41.11 would constitute an illegal corporate campaign expenditure.

In 2008, Citizens United produced a documentary film highly critical of Hillary Clinton called Hillary: The Movie. Fearing prosecution from the FEC, the organization sought a declaratory judgment in federal court to assure their right to show the movie, leading ultimately to the Supreme Court decision in Citizens United v. Federal Election Commission. It previously produced and screened advertisements attacking other Democrats, including Bill Clinton, John Kerry, and Al Gore. In the 1988 US presidential election, Citizens United ran an ad that used Willie Horton to attack Democratic nominee Michael Dukakis.

The group has produced a film criticizing the United Nations.

== Trump administration ==
In 2016, the Donald Trump presidential campaign enlisted Citizens United President David Bossie as deputy campaign manager. During the campaign, Bossie made regular television appearances on behalf of the Trump campaign. Bossie is a close friend and longtime acquaintance of Trump administration officials Steve Bannon and Kellyanne Conway, having introduced Bannon to Trump in 2011.

== Documentaries ==
Citizens United has released 25 documentaries. These include:

- The Truth Revealed... Confidential Report: Bill Clinton, Al Gore and the Communist Chinese Connection (1999)
- Celsius 41.11 (2004)
- Border War: The Battle Over Illegal Immigration (2006)
- Hillary: The Movie (2008)
- Rediscovering God in America (2008)
- Fire From the Heartland: The Awakening of the Conservative Woman (2010)
- Generation Zero (2010)
- Nine Days that Changed the World (2010)
- Occupy Unmasked (2012)

== Citizens United v. Federal Election Commission ==
Citizens United was the plaintiff in a Supreme Court case that began as a challenge to various statutory provisions of the Bipartisan Campaign Reform Act of 2002 (BCRA), known as the "McCain-Feingold" law. The case revolved around the documentary Hillary: The Movie, which was produced by Citizens United. Under the McCain-Feingold law, a federal court in Washington, D.C., ruled that Citizens United would be barred from advertising its film. The case (08-205, 558 U.S. 50 (2010)) was heard in the United States Supreme Court on March 24, 2009. During oral argument, the government argued that under existing precedents, it had the power under the Constitution to prohibit the publication of books and movies if they were made or sold by corporations. After that hearing, the Court requested re-argument specifically to address whether deciding the case required the Court to reconsider those earlier decisions in Austin v. Michigan Chamber of Commerce and McConnell v. FEC. The case was re-argued on September 9. On January 21, 2010, the Supreme Court overturned the provision of McCain-Feingold barring corporations and unions from paying for political ads made independently of candidate campaigns. A dissenting opinion by Justice Stevens was joined by Justice Ginsburg, Justice Breyer, and Justice Sotomayor.

== Funding ==
Citizens United has accepted funding from The Presidential Coalition, LLC (which according to their website is "An Affiliate Of Citizens United") and the Koch brothers.
