= Hillary: The Movie =

- Theatrical release poster
- Directed by: Alan Peterson
- Written by: Alan Peterson; Lee Troxler; Michael Wright
- Produced by: Alan Peterson
- Release date: 2008
- Running time: 90 minutes
- Country: United States
- Language: English

Hillary: The Movie is a 2008 political documentary about United States Senator and presidential candidate Hillary Clinton. It was described by The New York Times as "a relentlessly negative look at Hillary Clinton’s career and character". It was produced by the conservative non-profit organization Citizens United. The film was scheduled to be offered as video-on-demand on cable TV right before the Democratic primaries in January 2008. However, its airing would have been classified as "electioneering communication", which was made illegal under the Bipartisan Campaign Reform Act, by the Federal Election Commission. The producers went to U.S. District Court for the District of Columbia to get a declaration that they could show their movie and promotional ads for it despite BCRA. This case was titled Citizens United v. Federal Election Commission and its final decision at the U.S. Supreme Court resulted in a major change in campaign finance law.

The documentary interviewed various conservative figures such as Dick Morris and Ann Coulter and reviewed various scandals in which Hillary Clinton purportedly participated, such as the White House travel office controversy, White House FBI files controversy, Whitewater controversy, and cattle futures controversy. The factual finding of the three-judge district court was that there was "no reasonable interpretation [of the movie] other than as an appeal to vote against Senator Clinton", thus making it "electioneering communication". The Supreme Court did not change that decision, but applied the strict scrutiny test for the First Amendment of the Constitution and said corporations could not be banned from making electioneering communications.

== Legal case ==
In December 2007, Citizens United v. Federal Election Commission. was filed at the United States District Court for the District of Columbia. A special three-judge panel (as specified in BCRA) sided with the Federal Election Commission (FEC) that under the McCain-Feingold Bipartisan Campaign Reform Act, Hillary: The Movie could not be shown on television right before the 2008 Democratic primaries.

Another provision in BCRA specified that constitutional appeals from the District Court must be immediately filed directly with the U.S. Supreme Court. Citizens United did so on August 18, 2008. Oral arguments were heard on March 24, 2009; a decision was expected sometime in the early summer months of 2009.

In 2010 the Supreme Court ruled 5–4 that the spending limits in the McCain-Feingold Act were unconstitutional under the First Amendment, which allowed essentially unlimited independent expenditures by non-profit organizations.

== See also ==
- Clinton Cash – a 2015 book and film critical of the Clintons
- Super-PAC
