= Border War: The Battle Over Illegal Immigration =

- Directed by: Kevin Knoblock
- Written by: Kevin Knoblock
- Produced by: Kevin Knoblock; David N. Bossie
- Release date: 2006
- Running time: 95 minutes
- Country: United States
- Language: English

Border War: The Battle Over Illegal Immigration is a 2006 documentary film, written, produced and directed by Kevin Knoblock. The film tells the stories of five people whose lives have been affected by illegal immigration along the U.S.-Mexico border. They are J.D. Hayworth, a Republican congressman from Arizona, Teri March, widow of Los Angeles County Sheriff's Deputy David March, who was murdered by an illegal immigrant in 2002, U.S. Border Patrol agent Jose Maheda, Border Angels founder and activist for undocumented migrants Enrique Morones, and Lupe Moreno, a female Hispanic member of the Minuteman Project.

The documentary film was released theatrically on approximately 20 screens in the United States in September and October 2006. The DVD is distributed by Genius Products, a video and DVD distributor majority owned by The Weinstein Company.
