= Bill Sammon =

American journalist

Bill Sammon is a former managing editor and vice president for Fox News, as well as an author and newspaper columnist. He had previously worked as White House correspondent for The Washington Times and the Washington Examiner before joining Fox News in August 2008.

== Personal life ==
A graduate of Saint Ignatius High School, in Cleveland, Ohio, and Miami University in Oxford, Ohio, Sammon lives in Maryland with his wife, Becky, and their five children. He is 6 feet 7 inches tall and was reportedly nicknamed "Big Stretch" or "Superstretch" by President George W. Bush.

== Career ==
Sammon authored four New York Times bestsellers: At Any Cost: How Al Gore Tried to Steal the Election; Fighting Back: The War on Terrorism From Inside the White House; Misunderestimated: The President Battles Terrorism, Media Bias and the Bush Haters; and Strategery: How George W. Bush Is Defeating Terrorists, Outwitting Democrats, and Confounding the Mainstream Media. These books have been largely derided as overtly favorable to President George W. Bush and his administration. Vanity Fair critic James Wolcott listed Strategery among other related books on Bush written by "faithful holdouts in Bush's pep squad [who] are happy to have endowed him with superpowers" as "hagiography mash notes whose toothy gleam of triumphalism was almost blinding". Reporter David Weigel sarcastically referred to these books as "scathing critiques of presidential power". The American Prospect wrote that Sammon "wrote an astonishing four books on the topic of Bush's super-awesomeness".

He is a frequent guest on Fox News programs like Special Report with Brit Hume, Fox News Sunday, and Hannity & Colmes. On September 13, 2007, Sammon appeared on Special Report and argued that Theodore Olson should be confirmed as Attorney General.

On February 27, 2009, Sammon was promoted to vice president of Fox News and Washington managing editor.

In January 2021, Sammon announced he was retiring at the end of the month, with his position to be assumed by editorial staff members. On the night of the 2020 United States presidential election, Sammon had supervised the network's Decision Desk HQ, which had controversially declared Arizona for then-Democratic presidential candidate Joe Biden. Sammon's departure, along with that of Chris Stirewalt, was seen as retaliatory in light of President Donald Trump's criticism of the network and subsequent decline in viewership. It was subsequently reported that Murdoch suggested that it was "maybe best to let Bill go right away" as a "big message with Trump people".

== Controversy ==
=== Fox News memos ===
Media watchdog group Media Matters for America published memos allegedly written by Sammon while he was Washington managing editor at Fox News where he reminded recipients not to refer to the public option proposal in the Patient Protection and Affordable Care Act by name, but instead use terms like "government-run health insurance" or to use various qualifiers. The publication of the memos received attention from media observers.

Another leaked memo showed Sammon had given orders for Fox News to characterize then-Senator Barack Obama as a socialist. Sammon said Obama's remarks were "tantamount to socialism", on-air and in a FoxNews.com column, while sending around a memo noting Obama's "references to socialism, liberalism, Marxism and Marxists" in his 1995 memoir Dreams From My Father. Some questions that were asked by Fox journalists were allegedly scripted by Sammon. Sammon later explained the incident as a product of his "rather mischievous speculation about whether Barack Obama really advocated socialism, a premise that privately I found rather far-fetched".

In 2009, during the Copenhagen Summit, Sammon instructed Fox News reporters to "refrain from asserting that the planet has warmed (or cooled) in any given period without IMMEDIATELY pointing out that such theories are based upon data that critics have called into question."
