= The Greatest Generation (book) =

1998 book by Tom Brokaw

- Author: Tom Brokaw
- Language: English
- Genre: Non-fiction
- Publisher: Random House
- Publication date: 1998
- Publication place: United States

The Greatest Generation is a 1998 book by American journalist Tom Brokaw that profiles those who grew up in the United States during the deprivation of the Great Depression and then went on to fight in World War II as well as those whose productivity within the home front during World War II made a decisive material contribution to the war effort. The book popularized the term Greatest Generation for the name of the cultural generation before the Silent Generation.

== Summary ==
Brokaw profiles those who came of age during World War II in the United States, stemming from his attendance at the D-Day 40th anniversary celebrations. In the book, Brokaw wrote that "it is, I believe, the greatest generation any society has ever produced." He argued that these men and women fought not for fame and recognition, but because it was the "right thing to do."

== See also ==
- Military history of the United States during World War II
- United States home front during World War II

== Sources ==
- The Greatest Generation by Tom Brokaw (1998) ISBN 0-375-50202-5 (hardback) ISBN 0-385-33462-1 (paperback), depicts the Americans who came of age during the Great Depression and fought World War II.
- The Greatest Generation Speaks by Tom Brokaw (1999) ISBN 0-375-50394-3 (hardback) ISBN 0-385-33538-5 (paperback)
- The Great Boom 1950–2000: How a Generation of Americans Created the World's Most Prosperous Society by Robert Sobel (2000) ISBN 0-312-20890-1
- Generations: The History of America's Future, 1584 to 2069 by Strauss and Howe (1991) ISBN 0-688-11912-3
