= Greatest Generation =

Cohort born from 1901 to 1927

The Greatest Generation, also known as the G.I. Generation and the World War II Generation, is the demographic cohort following the Lost Generation and preceding the Silent Generation. The generation is generally defined as people born from 1901 to 1927. They were shaped by the Great Depression and were the primary generation composing the enlisted forces in World War II.

== Terminology ==
An early usage of the term The Greatest Generation was in 1953 by U.S. Army General James Van Fleet, who had recently retired after his service in World War II and leading the Eighth Army in the Korean War. He spoke to Congress, saying, "The men of the Eighth Army are a magnificent lot, and I have always said the greatest generation of Americans we have ever produced." The term was popularized by the title of a 1998 book by American journalist Tom Brokaw. In the book, Brokaw profiles American members of this generation who came of age during the Great Depression and went on to fight in World War II, as well as those who contributed to the war effort on the home front. Brokaw wrote that these men and women fought not for fame or recognition, but because it was the "right thing to do".

This cohort is also referred to as the "World War II Generation" and the "G.I. Generation". The "G.I. Generation" term was first used in 1971 by Alberto M. Camarillo, in the academic journal Aztlán: A Journal of Chicano Studies. The term became more popular after authors William Strauss and Neil Howe used it in their 1991 book Generations: The History of America's Future.

== Date and age range definitions ==
Pew Research Center defines this cohort as being born from 1901 to 1927. Strauss and Howe use the birth years 1901–1924. The first half of this generation, born between 1901 and 1912, is sometimes referred to as the Interbellum Generation. The majority of veterans who served in World War II were born during the second half of this generation, from 1913 to 1924. While the oldest members of the Interbellum Generation came of age at the close of the 1910s in 1919, the majority reached maturity in the 1920s and the minority had grown up in the initial years of the Great Depression from 1929 to 1932. The "WWII Generation" proper came of age in either the second half of the 1930s or the early years of the 1940s.

== Characteristics ==
=== United States ===
==== Adolescence ====
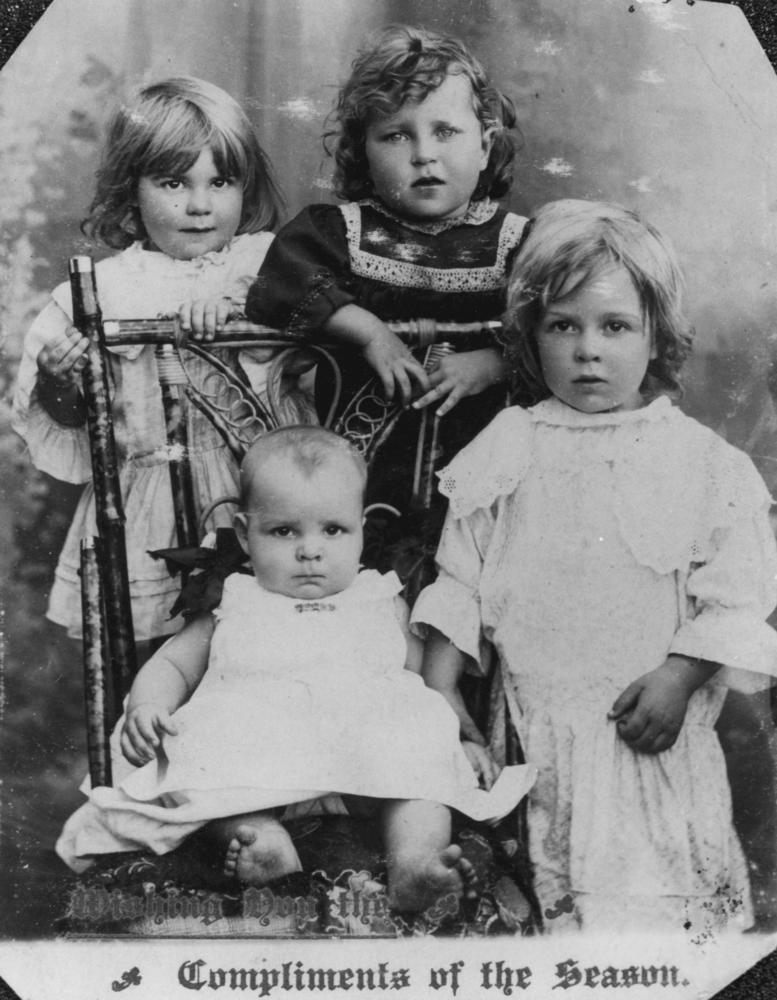
Portrait of Australian girls, c. between 1910 and 1920

US members of this generation came of age as early as 1919 and as late as 1945. They were children or were born during the Progressive Era, World War I, and the Roaring Twenties, a time of economic prosperity with distinctive cultural transformations. Additionally, many of those alive from 1918 through 1920 experienced the deadly Spanish flu pandemic; and, incredibly, a few rare individuals, such as Anna Del Priore, managed to survive infection from both the Spanish flu and the COVID-19 pandemic approximately 100 years later. They also experienced much of their youth with rapid technological innovation (e.g., radio, telephone, automobile) amidst growing levels of worldwide income inequality and a soaring economy. After the Stock Market crashed, when many had matured in the 1930s, this generation experienced profound economic and social turmoil.

Despite the hardships, historians note that the literature, arts, music, and cinema of the period flourished. This generation experienced what is commonly referred to as the "Golden Age of Hollywood". A number of popular film genres, including gangster films, musical films, comedy films, and monster films attracted mass audiences. The Great Depression also greatly influenced literature and witnessed the advent of comic books, which were popular with members of this generation with such characters as Doc Savage, the Shadow, Superman and Batman. Next to jazz, blues, gospel music, and folk music, swing jazz became immensely popular with members of this generation. The term "Swing Generation" has also been used to describe the cohort due to the popularity of the era's music. The popularity of the radio also became a major influence in the lives of this generation, as millions tuned in to listen to President Franklin D. Roosevelt's "fireside chats" and absorbed the news in a way like never before.

==== Great Depression and World War II ====
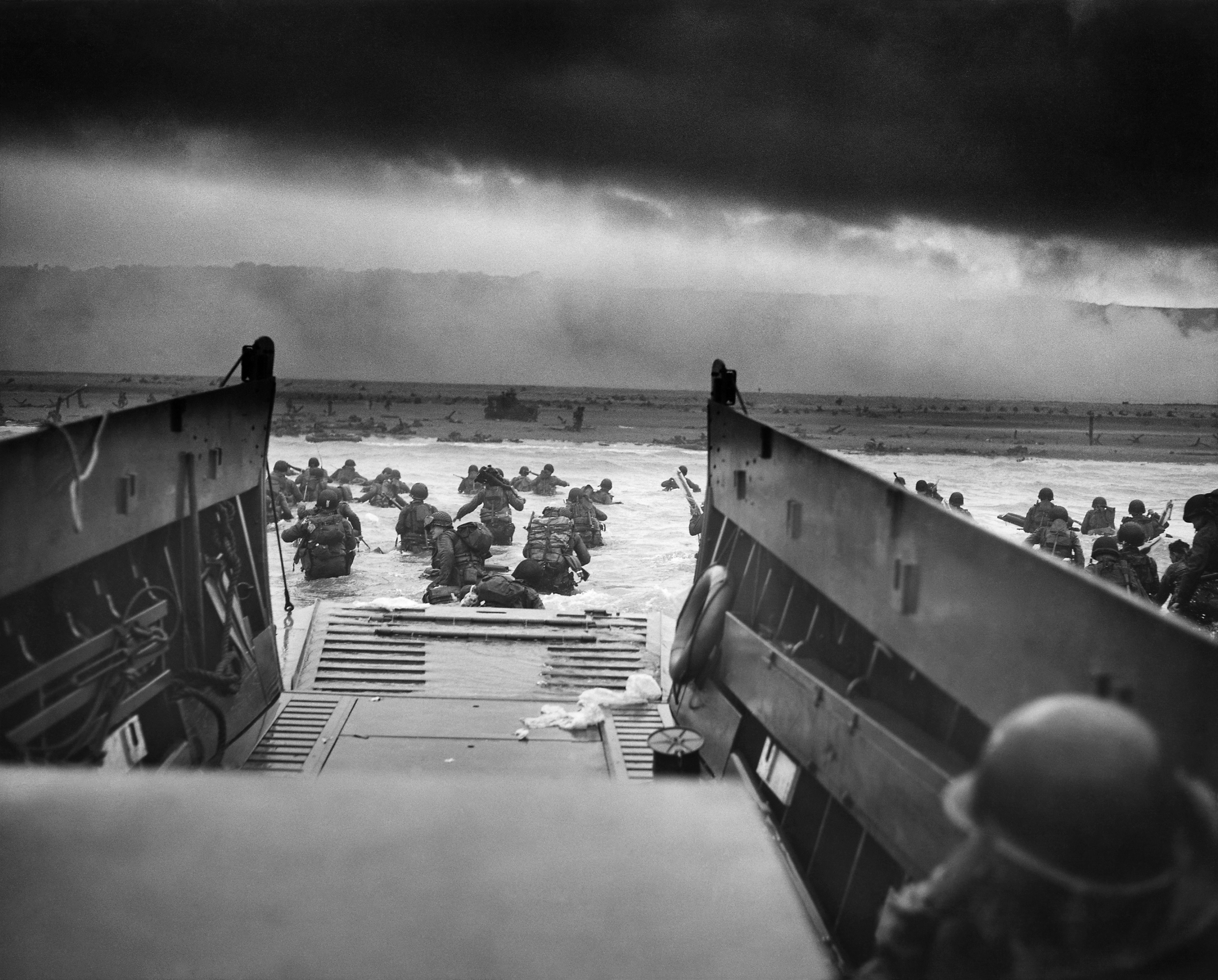
American G.I.s land on Omaha Beach on June 6, 1944.

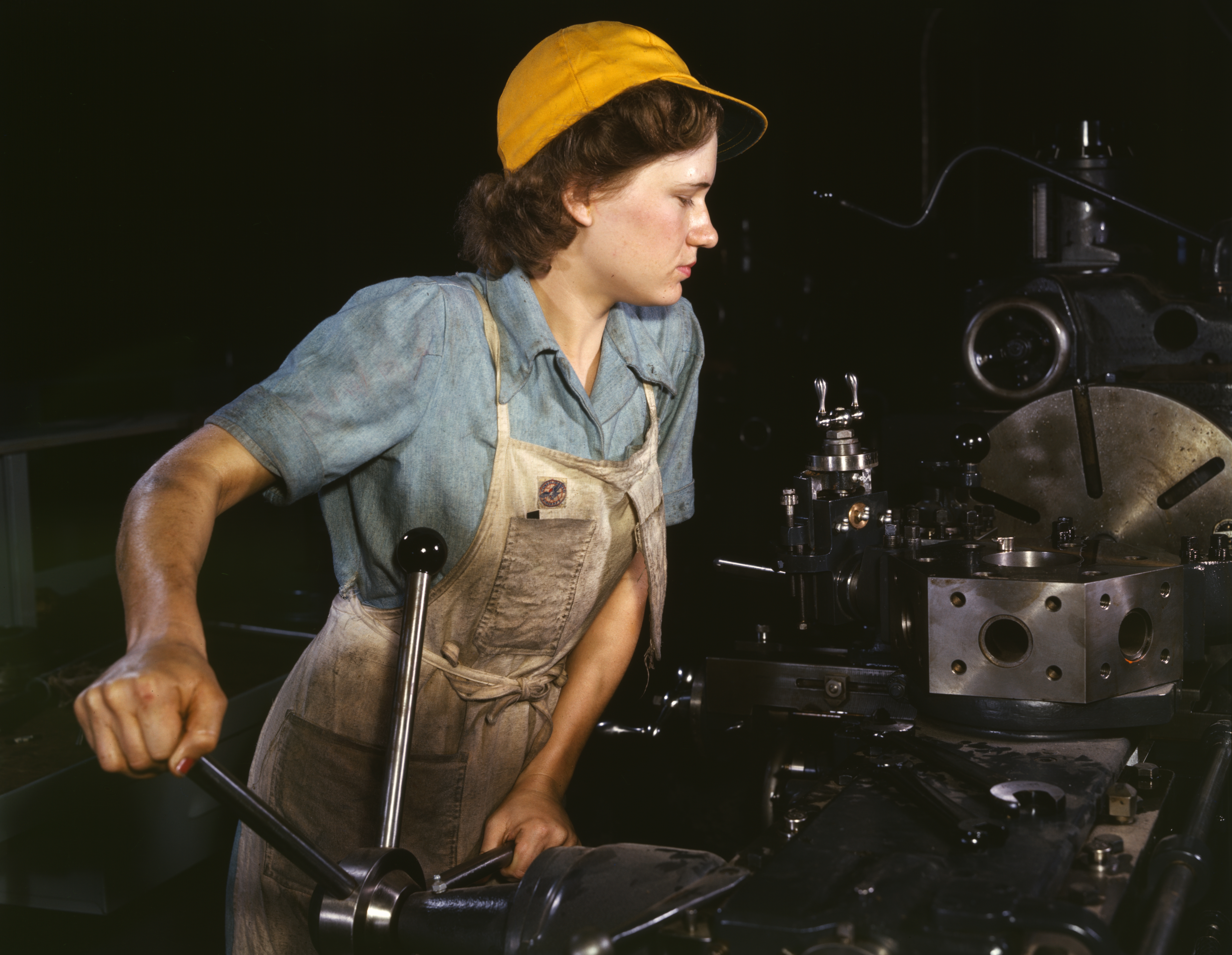
A woman working in a military aircraft factory in Fort Worth, Texas, in 1942. Millions of American women found work in the defense industry during the war.

Over 16 million Americans served in World War II, the majority being members of this generation. 38.8% were volunteers, 61.2% were draftees, the average length of their service was 33 months, and total approximate casualties were 671,278 (killed and wounded). American journalist Tom Brokaw and others extol this generation for supporting and fighting World War II.

==== Post-war ====
Following the war, this generation produced children at an unprecedented level. Over 76 million babies were born between 1946 and 1964. Subsidized by the G.I. Bill, this generation moved their families into the suburbs and largely promoted a more conservative mindset as the country faced the challenge of the Cold War, as some were again called to service in the Korean War alongside the Silent Generation. The first member of their generation to be elected US president, John F. Kennedy, began a Space Race against the Soviet Union, and his successor, Lyndon B. Johnson, further promoted a controversial "Great Society" policy. All US presidents between 1961 and 1993 (John F. Kennedy, Lyndon B. Johnson, Richard Nixon, Gerald Ford, Jimmy Carter, Ronald Reagan, George H. W. Bush) were members of the Greatest Generation.

Research professor of sociology Glen Holl Elder, Jr., a prominent figure in the development of life course theory, wrote Children of the Great Depression (1974), "the first longitudinal study of a Great Depression cohort." Elder followed 167 individuals born in California between 1920 and 1921 and "traced the impact of Depression and wartime experiences from the early years to middle age. Most of these 'children of the Great Depression' fared unusually well in their adult years". They came out of the hardships of the Great Depression "with an ability to know how to survive and make do and solve problems."

==== Relationship with later generations ====
A culture clash occurred between the Greatest Generation and their baby boomer children/grandchildren in the 1960s and 1970s, in the form of the Vietnam War, civil rights movement, Watergate scandal, and the counterculture movement. Attitudes shaped during World War II clashed with those of the Vietnam era, as many G.I.s struggled to understand the general distrust of government by the younger generation, though some Greatest Generation members supported anti-war protests. The same generation gap applied to a lesser extent in the 1950s, between the Interbellum Generation and their Silent Generation children.

==== Later years and legacy ====
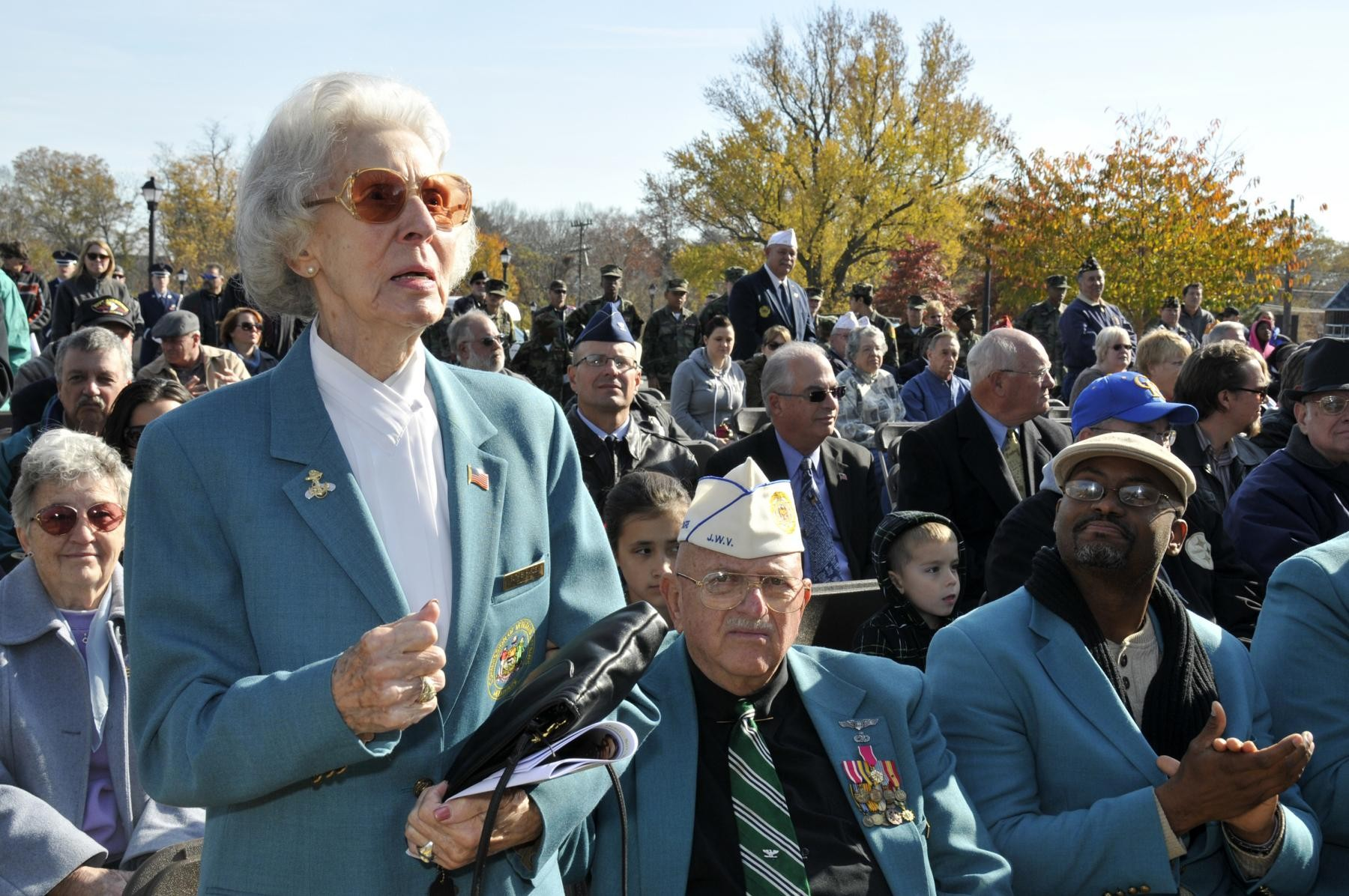
US Navy veteran Ruth Harden sings as "Anchors Aweigh" is played during the dedication ceremony of the World War II memorial at Legislative Hall in Dover, Delaware, November 9, 2013.

According to a 2004 study done by AARP, "There are 26 million people aged 77 or older in the United States. These people are largely conservative on economic (59%) and social (49%) issues, and about one-third of them say they have become more conservative on economic, social, foreign policy, moral, and legal issues as they have aged. Over 9 in 10 (91%) of this age group are registered to vote and 90% voted in the 2000 presidential election. The last member of this generation to be elected president was George H. W. Bush (1989–1993), and the last surviving president from this generation was Jimmy Carter (1977–1981). In its latter years, this generation was introduced to continued technological advancements such as mobile phones and the Internet.

As of 2026 some 30,000 (under 0.2%) of the 16 million Americans who served in World War II remain alive. Living members of this generation are either in their late 90s or are centenarians.

The lives of this generation are a common element of popular culture in the western world, and media related to this generation's experiences continues to be produced. The romanticizing of this generation has faced criticism by some. However, some also praise the traits and actions of this generation and cite their sacrifices as a lesson for current generations.

=== Britain ===
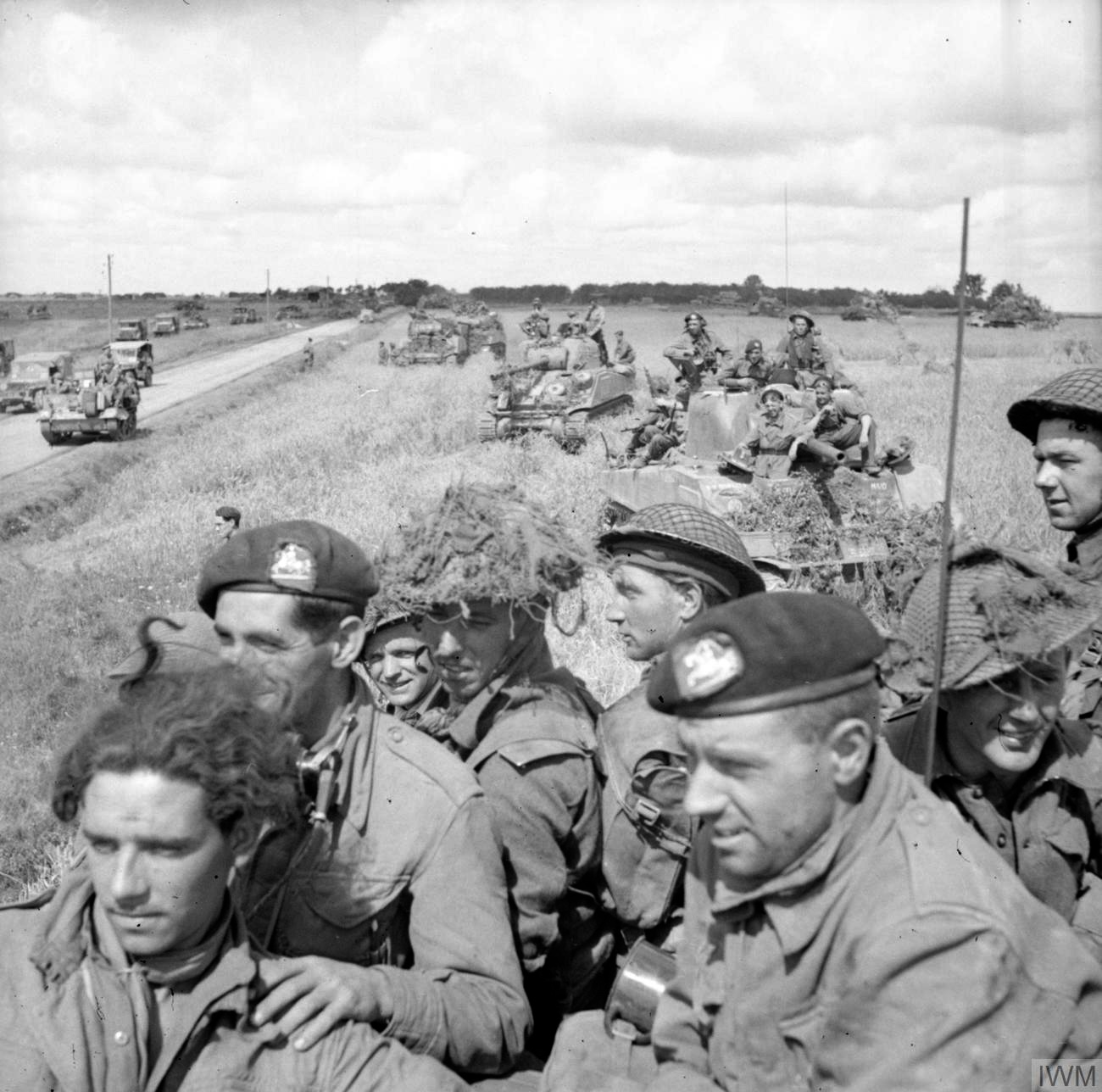
British infantry aboard Sherman tanks, near Argentan, August 21, 1944.

In Britain, this generation came of age, like most of the western world, during a period of economic hardship as a result of the Great Depression. When the war in Europe began, millions of British citizens joined the war effort at home and abroad. Over 6 million members of this generation served in the war, and there were 384,000 casualties. At home, the Blitz claimed the lives of tens of thousands and British cities suffered heavy destruction. The men and women of this generation continue to be honored in the U.K., particularly on V-E Day. In 2020, British Prime Minister Boris Johnson compared this generation to current generations and indicated his desire for them to show the "same spirit of national endeavour", in relation to the COVID-19 pandemic.

=== Germany ===
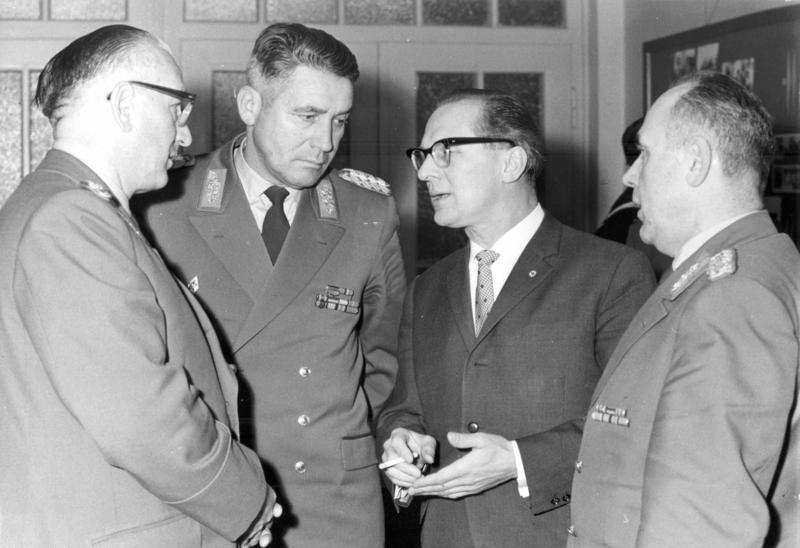
East German leader Erich Honecker, a communist of the German resistance during World War II, with NVA generals Walter Allenstein, Heinz Hoffmann and Kurt Wagner – the first a former Roter Frontkämpferbund militant, the second an International Brigades veteran of the Spanish Civil War, the third a former political prisoner of Waldheim Prison

Members of the World War II generation in Germany came of age following World War I and the German Revolution of 1918–1919. They faced economic hardships related to the Great Depression and Treaty of Versailles as unemployment rose to nearly 40%. Adolf Hitler then rose to power, and many of this generation joined organizations such as the Hitler Youth. In 1935, Hitler instituted military conscription. During the war, nearly 12.5 million members of this generation served in the war and 4.3 million were killed or wounded. By the end of the war, 5 million Germans were dead, including civilians. German cities and towns were devastated by Allied bombing campaigns. 12 million Germans were refugees and many were forced to settle in the Soviet Union. In addition, the Holocaust claimed the lives of millions of German Jews and others. Following the war, the Allies began the denazification and demilitarization of a post-war Germany. Returning German veterans found their country carved up into four zones of occupation; later becoming West Germany and East Germany. In the west, the Marshall Plan resulted in the "Wirtschaftswunder", an economic boom that caused 185% growth between 1950 and 1963. Surviving members of the German World War II generation would go on to experience the fall of the Berlin Wall and the creation of the European Union. Unlike the Western allies and the Soviet Union, Germany did not honor its veterans, as the association with Nazism continues in contemporary Germany today.

=== Soviet Union ===
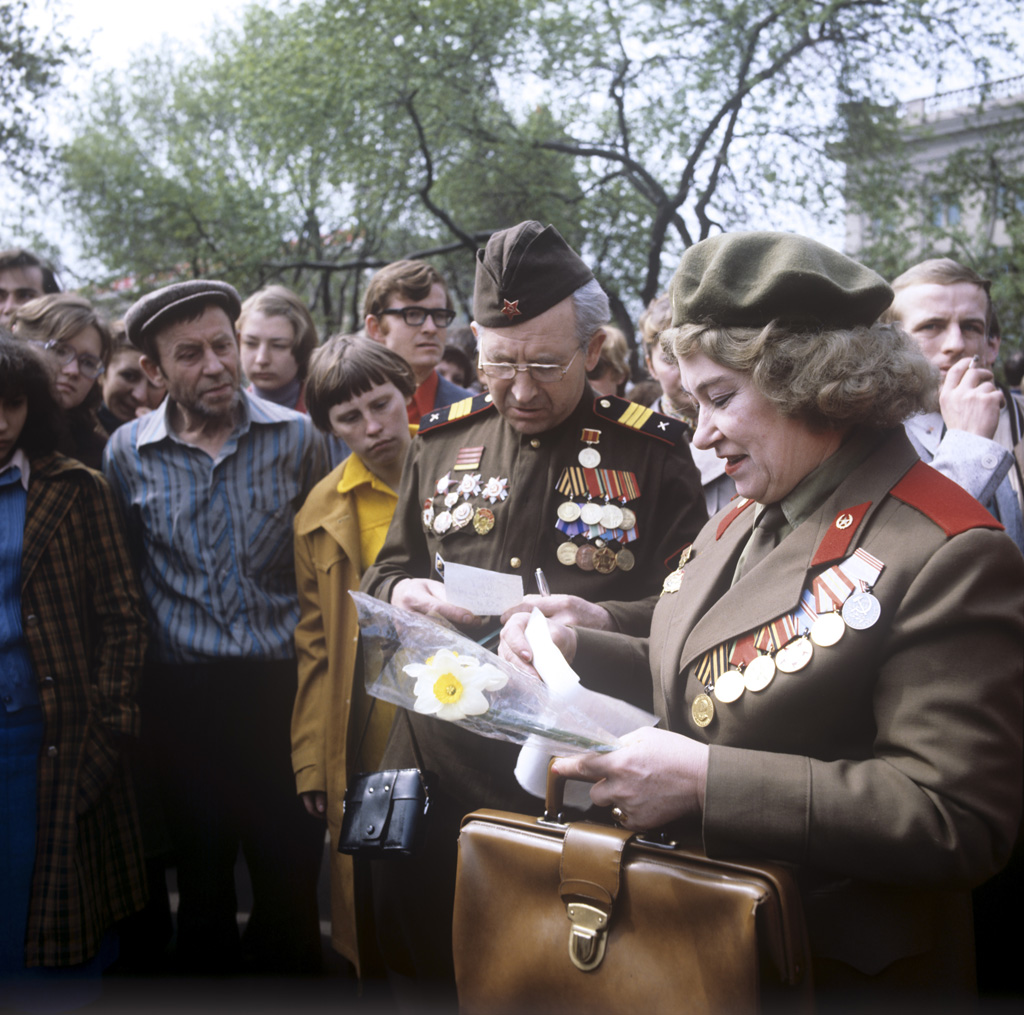
Red Army veterans of the Great Patriotic War Umar Burkhanov and Tatyana Didenko exchanging addresses in Moscow on Victory Day, 1979

As children, members of this generation came of age during Joseph Stalin's rise to power. They endured the Holodomor famine, which killed millions. The World War II generation of the Soviet Union was further decimated by the war. Stalin's scorched earth policy left its western regions in a state of devastation worsened by the advancing German Army. The USSR lost 14% of its pre-war population during WWII, a demographic collapse that would have immense long-term consequences.

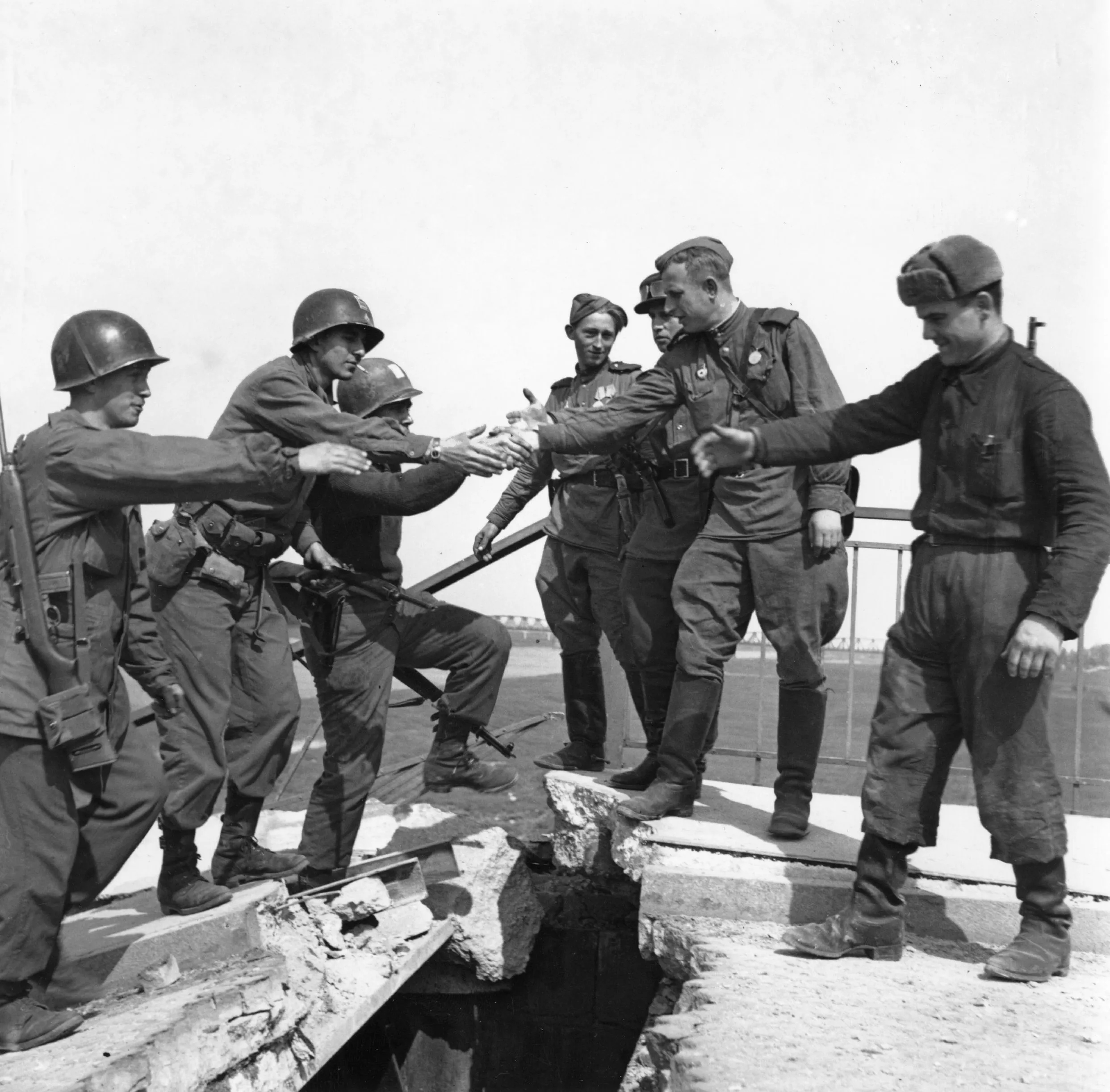
Staged re-enactment of the April 25, 1945 American and Soviet link-up at the Elbe River; Soviet lieutenant Charles Thau is identified at center, behind handshake facing camera. Photograph was taken after initial contact between the patrols.

Mass forced labor was often used and there were between 10 and 11 million Soviet men returning to help rebuild along with 2 million Soviet dissidents held prisoner in Stalin's Gulags. Then came the Cold War and the Space Race. Even in the mid-1980s, around 70% of Soviet industrial output was directed towards the military, one of the factors in its eventual economic collapse. Members of this generation are known as "Great Patriotic War" veterans, such as poet Yuri Levitansky who wrote about the horrors of the war and Vasily Zaitsev, a war hero who would later be detained for two years as a victim of the post-war atmosphere of paranoia. Today, former Soviet states celebrate an annual Victory Day. The latest survey conducted by Russia's Levada Center suggests Victory Day is still one of the most important public holidays for Russian citizens, with 65% of those surveyed planning to celebrate it. But for nearly one third of people (31%) it is a "state public event" while for another 31% it is a "memorial day for all former Soviet people". Only 16% of those asked recognize it in its original context as a "veterans' memorial day". The predominant emotion the holiday provokes among Russians (59% of respondents) is national pride, while 18% said "sorrow" and 21% said "both". For modern Russians, the conflict continues to provide the population with a nationalistic rallying call.

=== Japan ===
The World War II generation of Japan came of age during a time of rapid imperialism. One member of this generation, Hirohito, would become Emperor in 1926, when Japan was already one of the great powers. Nearly 18 million members of this generation would fight in World War II and approximately 3 million, including civilians, would be killed or wounded. Japanese cities, towns, and villages were devastated by Allied bombing campaigns. In an effort to prepare for the assumed Allied invasion, the Japanese government prepared to submit this generation to "Operation Ketsugo", in which the Japanese population would fight a war of attrition. Returning veterans found their country occupied and received little support or respect. Surviving members of this generation would see Japan emerge as the world's second-largest economy by 1989. Surviving veterans visit the Yasukuni Shrine to pay tribute to their fallen comrades.

== See also ==
- G.I. Bill, in USA
- List of last surviving veterans of World War II

Preceded by Lost Generation; 1883 – 1900	Greatest Generation; 1901 – 1927	Succeeded by Silent Generation; 1928 – 1945
