= The Fourth Turning =

1997 book by Neil Howe and William Strauss

The Fourth Turning: An American Prophecy
- Author: Neil Howe and William Strauss
- Subject: Strauss–Howe generational theory
- Publisher: Broadway Books
- Publication date: January 27, 1997
- Followed by: The Fourth Turning Is Here

The Fourth Turning: An American Prophecy is a 1997 book by Neil Howe and William Strauss. It is based on the Strauss–Howe generational theory, which posits that American history is driven by political and economic crisis cycles, followed by periods of prosperity. A sequel, The Fourth Turning Is Here, was published in 2023.

== Reception ==
The book received mostly positive reviews. Kirkus Reviews wrote that "Strauss and Howe use an amazing knowledge of popular culture to remain entertaining throughout, despite the heavy subject matter, and produce a metahistory to ponder as we approach the new millennium." LeGrande Fletcher, in Trends in Law Library Management and Technology, called it "an unusual approach to evaluating societal trends that law librarians might want to consider, even if they disagree with the authors' historical predictions." The book has also influenced policymakers such as Steve Bannon.

In his review for the Boston Globe, historian David Kaiser called The Fourth Turning "a provocative and immensely entertaining outline of American history, Strauss and Howe have taken a gamble". "If the United States calmly makes it to 2015, their work will end up in the ashcan of history, but if they are right, they will take their place among the great American prophets." Kaiser has since argued that the crises which Strauss and Howe predicted seem to have occurred, citing events such as 9/11, the 2008 financial crisis, and the recent political gridlock. Kaiser has incorporated Strauss and Howe's theory in two historical works of his own, American Tragedy: Kennedy, Johnson, and the Origins of the Vietnam War (2000), and No End Save Victory: How FDR Led the Nation into War (2014).

Michael Lind, a historian and co-founder of the New America Foundation, wrote that The Fourth Turning was vague and verged into the realm of "pseudoscience"; "most of the authors' predictions about the American future turn out to be as vague as those of fortune cookies". Lind said that the theory is essential "non-falsifiable" and "mystifying." For The New York Times in 2017, Pulitzer-winning journalist Jeremy Peters wrote that "many academic historians dismiss the book as about as scientific as astrology or a Nostradamus text."
