= The Fourth Turning Is Here =

2023 book by Neil Howe

- Author: Neil Howe
- Subject: Strauss–Howe generational theory
- Genre: Non-fiction
- Publisher: Simon & Schuster
- Publication date: July 18, 2023
- Preceded by: The Fourth Turning

The Fourth Turning Is Here is a 2023 book by Neil Howe. It is a sequel to The Fourth Turning (1997), which was co-written with William Strauss.

== Summary ==
The book elaborates on the Strauss–Howe generational theory, positing that the United States is in a political and economic crisis that began with the 2008 Great Recession and will end in the early 2030s. It examines the role that different generational cohorts, namely baby boomers, Generation X, Millennials, and Generation Z (referred to by Howe as the Homeland Generation), play in shaping the modern United States.

== Reception ==
Francis Fukuyama, in The New York Times, criticized the book's thesis for being too neat and arbitrary, calling it "an updated version of Whig history." N.S. Lyons of City Journal described the book as "Filled with fascinating historical data and incisive observations, it succeeds in making a convincing case that the crisis we can all feel coming has indeed reached our doorstep" but criticized its linear view of history.

Kirkus Reviews wrote "That history runs in cycles has always preoccupied a scattering of historians and attracted a fervent following. Skeptics may roll their eyes, but all readers should enjoy this wild ride by an entertaining writer who seems to have read every relevant source."
