= Lost Generation =

Cohort born from 1883 to 1900

The Lost Generation was the demographic cohort that preceded the Greatest Generation. The generation is generally defined as people born from 1883 to 1900, those who came of age in the 1900s and 1910s and fought in World War I. The term is also particularly used to refer to a group of American expatriate writers living in Paris during the 1920s. Gertrude Stein is credited with coining the term, and it was subsequently popularised by Ernest Hemingway, who used it in the epigraph for his 1926 novel The Sun Also Rises: "You are all a lost generation." "Lost" in this context refers to the "disoriented, wandering, directionless" spirit of many of the war's survivors in the early interwar period.

In the wake of the Industrial Revolution, Western members of the Lost Generation grew up in societies that were more literate, consumerist, and media-saturated than ever before, but which also tended to maintain strictly conservative social values. Young men of the cohort were mobilised on a mass scale for World War I, a conflict that was often seen as the defining moment of their age group's lifespan. Young women also contributed to and were affected by the war, and in its aftermath gained greater freedoms politically and in other areas of life. The Lost Generation was also heavily vulnerable to the Spanish flu pandemic, and became the driving force behind many cultural changes, particularly in major cities during what became known as the Roaring Twenties.

Later in their midlife, they experienced the economic effects of the Great Depression and often saw their own children leave for the battlefields of World War II. In the developed world, they tended to reach retirement and average life expectancy during the decades after the conflict, but some significantly outlived the norm. The last known member of the Lost Generation, Nabi Tajima, died in 2018 at the age of 117.

== Terminology ==
The first named generation, the term "Lost Generation" is used for the young people who came of age around the time of World War I. In Europe, they are mostly known as the "Generation of 1914", for the year World War I began. In France, they were sometimes called the Génération du feu, the "[gun]fire generation". In the United Kingdom, the term was originally used for those who died in the war, and often implicitly referred to upper-class casualties who were perceived to have died disproportionately, robbing the country of a future elite. Many felt that "the flower of youth and the best manhood of the peoples [had] been mowed down", for example, such notable casualties as the poets Isaac Rosenberg, Rupert Brooke, Edward Thomas, and Wilfred Owen, composer George Butterworth, and physicist Henry Moseley.

== Date and age range definitions ==
Authors William Strauss and Neil Howe define the Lost Generation as the cohort born from 1883 to 1900, who came of age during World War I and the Roaring Twenties.

== Characteristics ==
=== As children and adolescents ===
==== Family life and upbringing ====
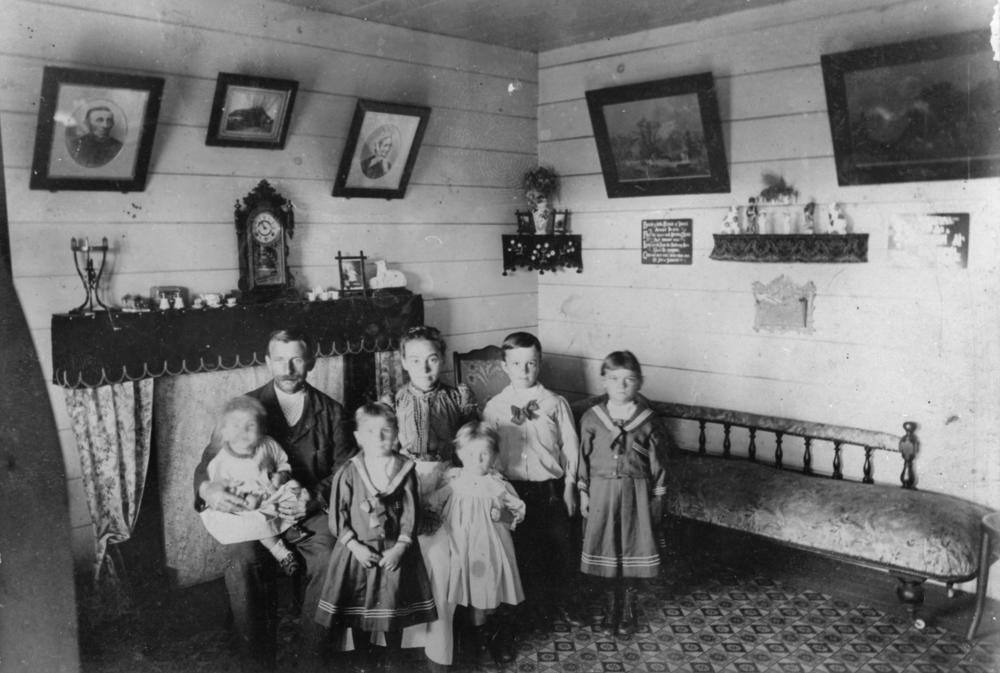
Family in Queensland pictured at home (c. 1900)

When the Lost Generation was growing up, the ideal family arrangement was generally seen as the man of the house being the breadwinner and primary authority figure while his wife dedicated herself to caring for the home and children. Most, even less well-off, married couples attempted to conform to this ideal. It was common for family members of three different generations to share a home. Wealthier households also tended to include domestic servants, though their numbers would have varied from a single maid to a large team depending on how well-off the family was.

Public concern for the welfare of children was intensifying by the later 19th century with laws being passed and societies formed to prevent their abuse. The state increasingly gained the legal right to intervene in private homes and family life to protect minors from harm. However, beating children for misbehaviour was not only common but viewed as the duty of a responsible caregiver.

==== Health and living conditions ====
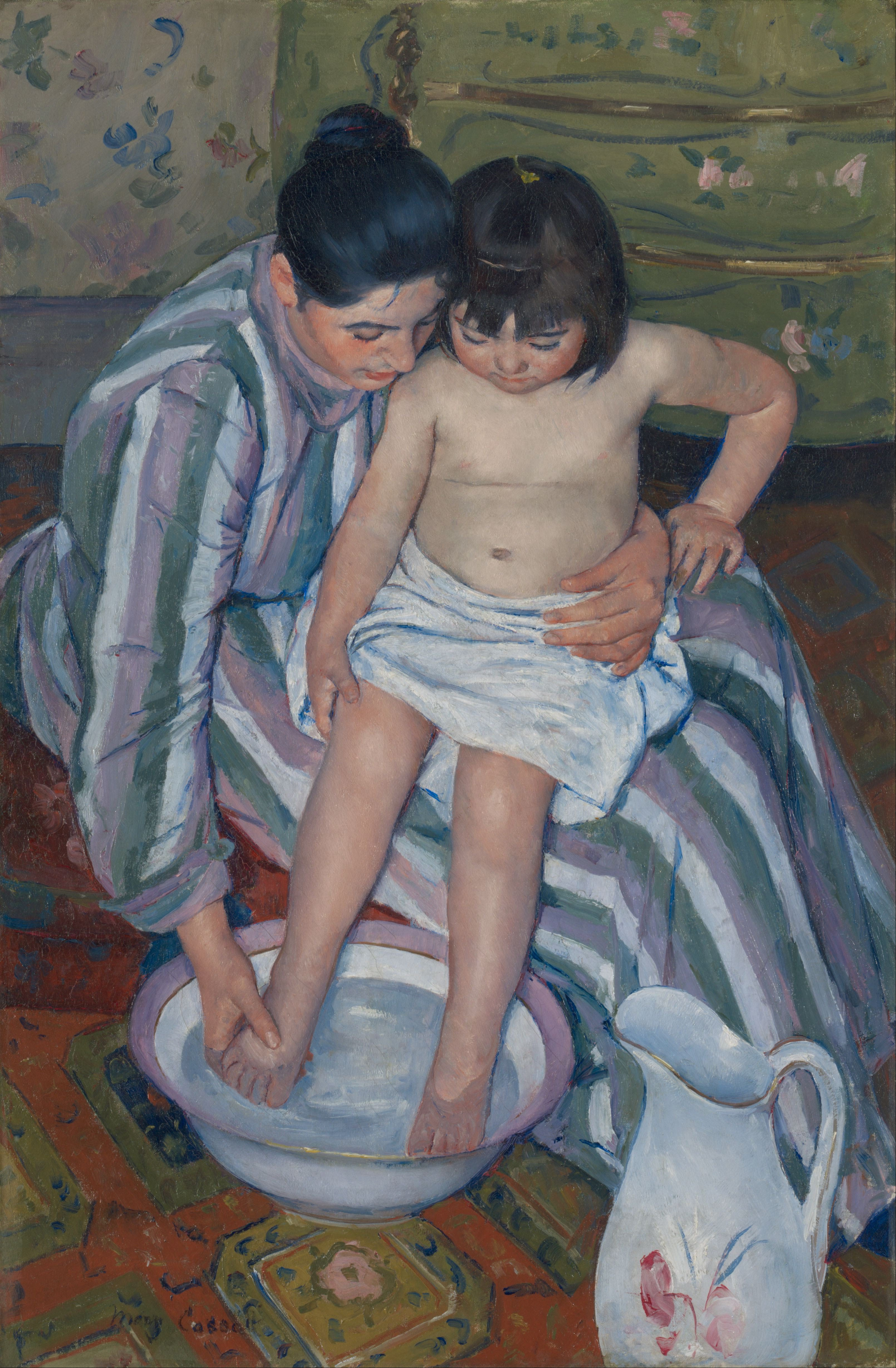
The Child's Bath by Mary Cassatt from 1893 of a woman giving a child a wash. The link between hygiene and good health was becoming better understood in Western society by the end of the 19th century and frequent bathing had become common.

Sewer systems designed to remove human waste from urban areas had become widespread in industrial cities by the late 19th century, helping to reduce the spread of diseases such as cholera. Legal standards for the quality of drinking water also began to be introduced. However, the introduction of electricity was slower, and during the formative years of the Lost Generation gas lights and candles were still the most common form of lighting.

Though statistics on child mortality dating back to the beginning of the Lost Generation's lifespan are limited, the Centers for Disease Control and Prevention report that in 1900 one in ten American infants died before their first birthday. Figures for the United Kingdom state that during the final years of the 19th century, mortality in the first five years of childhood was plateauing at a little under one in every four births. At around one in three in 1800, the early childhood mortality rate had declined overall throughout the next hundred years but would fall most sharply during the first half of the 20th century, reaching less than one in twenty by 1950. This meant that members of the Lost Generation were somewhat less likely to die at a very early age than their parents and grandparents, but were significantly more likely to do so than children born even a few decades later.

==== Literacy and education ====
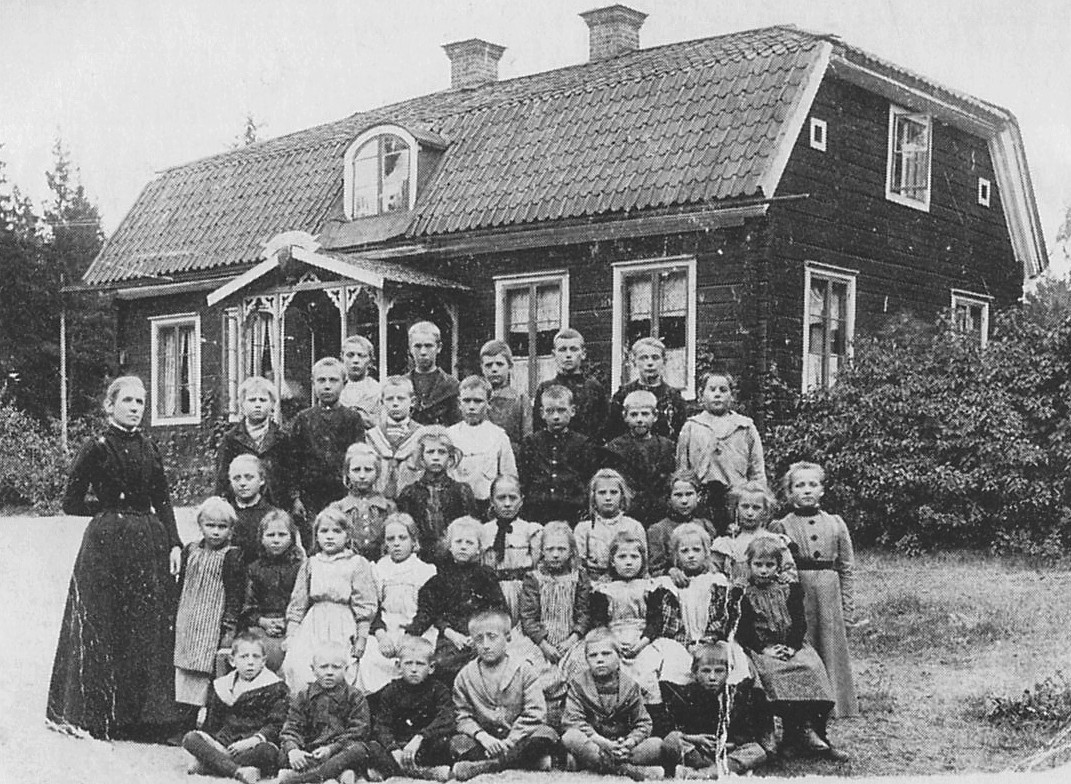
Class photo taken at a school in Sweden (1900)

By the end of the 19th century, compulsory education had been introduced throughout much of the Western world for at least a few years of childhood. By 1900, levels of illiteracy had fallen to less than 11% in the United States, around 3% in Great Britain, and only 1% in Germany. However, the problems of illiteracy and lack of school provision or attendance were felt more acutely in parts of Eastern and Southern Europe.

Schools of this time period tended to emphasise strict discipline, expecting pupils to memorise information by rote. To help deal with teacher shortages, older students were often used to help supervise and educate their younger peers. Dividing children into classes based on age became more common as schools grew.

However, while elementary schooling was becoming increasingly accessible for Western children going into the 20th century, secondary education was still much more of a luxury. Only 11% of American fourteen to seventeen-year-olds were enrolled in high school in 1900, a figure which had only marginally increased by 1910. Though the school leaving age was officially meant to be 14 by 1900, until the First World War, most British children could leave school through rules put in place by local authorities at 12 or 13 years old. It was not uncommon at the end of the 19th century for Canadian children to leave school at nine or ten years old.

==== Leisure and play ====
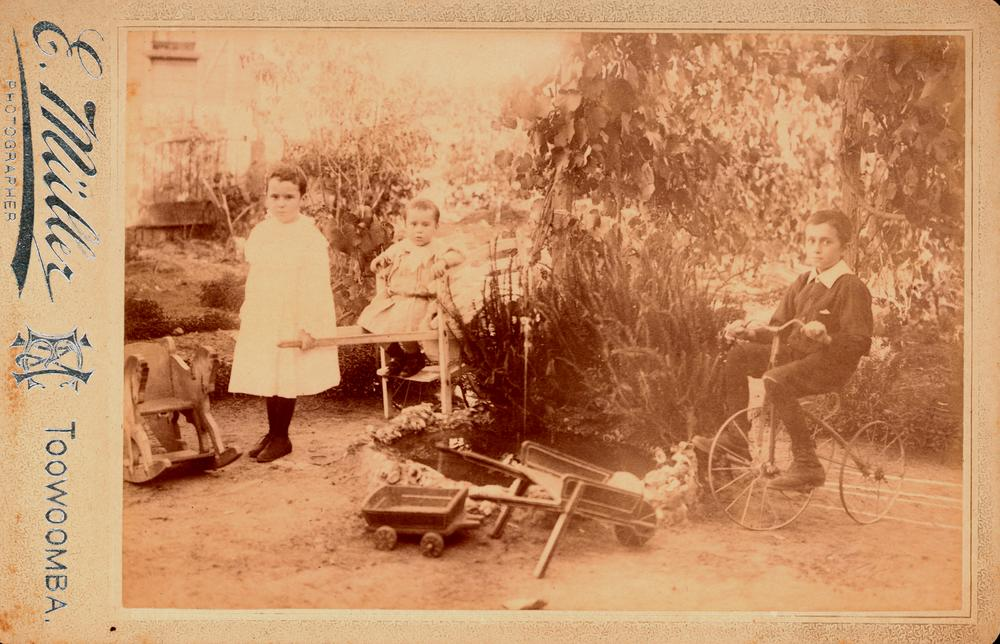
Children playing with toys (c. 1890s)

By the 1890s, children's toys entered into mass production. In 1893, the British toy company William Britain revolutionised the production of toy soldiers by devising the method of hollow casting, making soldiers that were cheaper and lighter than their competitors. This led to metal toy soldiers, which had previously been the preserve of boys from wealthier families, gaining mass appeal during the late Victorian and Edwardian periods. Dolls often sold by street vendors at a low price were popular with girls. Teddy bears appeared for the first time in the early 1900s. Tin plated penny toys were also sold by street sellers for a single penny.

The turn of the 20th century saw a surge in public park building in parts of the west to provide public space in rapidly growing industrial towns. They provided a means for children from different backgrounds to play and interact together, sometimes in specially designed facilities. They held frequent concerts and performances.

==== Popular culture and mass media ====
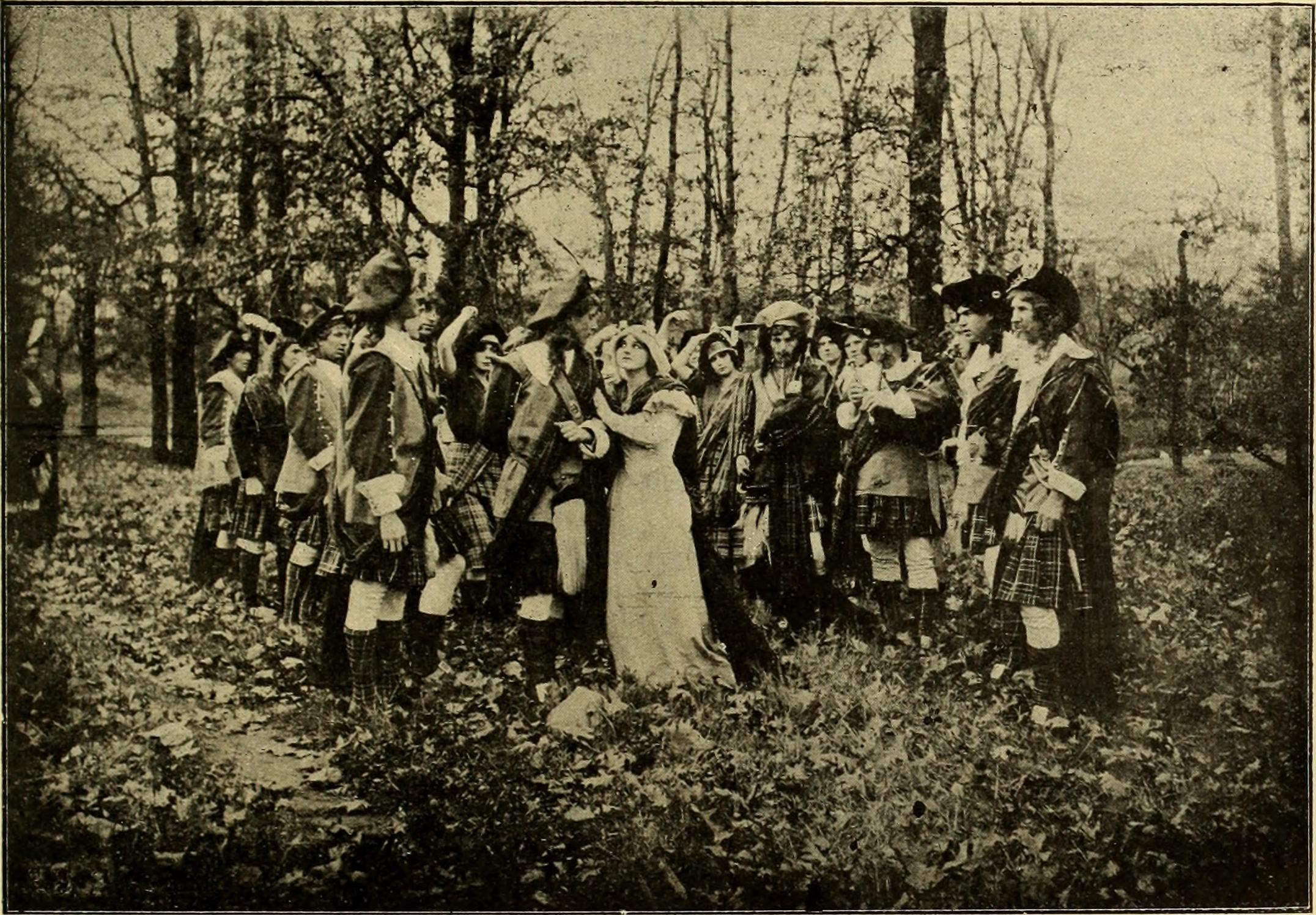
Scene from Lady of the Lake (Vitagraph film, 1912)

Beginning around the middle of the 19th century, magazines of various types which had previously mainly targeted the few that could afford them found rising popularity among the general public. The latter part of the century not only saw rising popularity for magazines targeted specifically at young boys but the development of a relatively new genre aimed at girls.

A significant milestone was reached in the development of cinema when, in 1895, projected moving images were first shown to a paying audience in Paris. Early films were very short (generally taking the form of newsreels, comedic sketches, and short documentaries). They lacked sound but were accompanied by music, lectures, and a lot of audience participation. A notable film industry had developed by the start of the First World War.

=== As young adults ===
==== Military service in the First World War ====
The Lost Generation is best known as being the cohort that primarily fought in World War I. More than 70 million people were mobilised during the First World War, around 8.5 million of whom were killed and 21 million wounded in the conflict. About 2 million soldiers are believed to have been killed by disease, while individual battles sometimes caused hundreds of thousands of deaths.

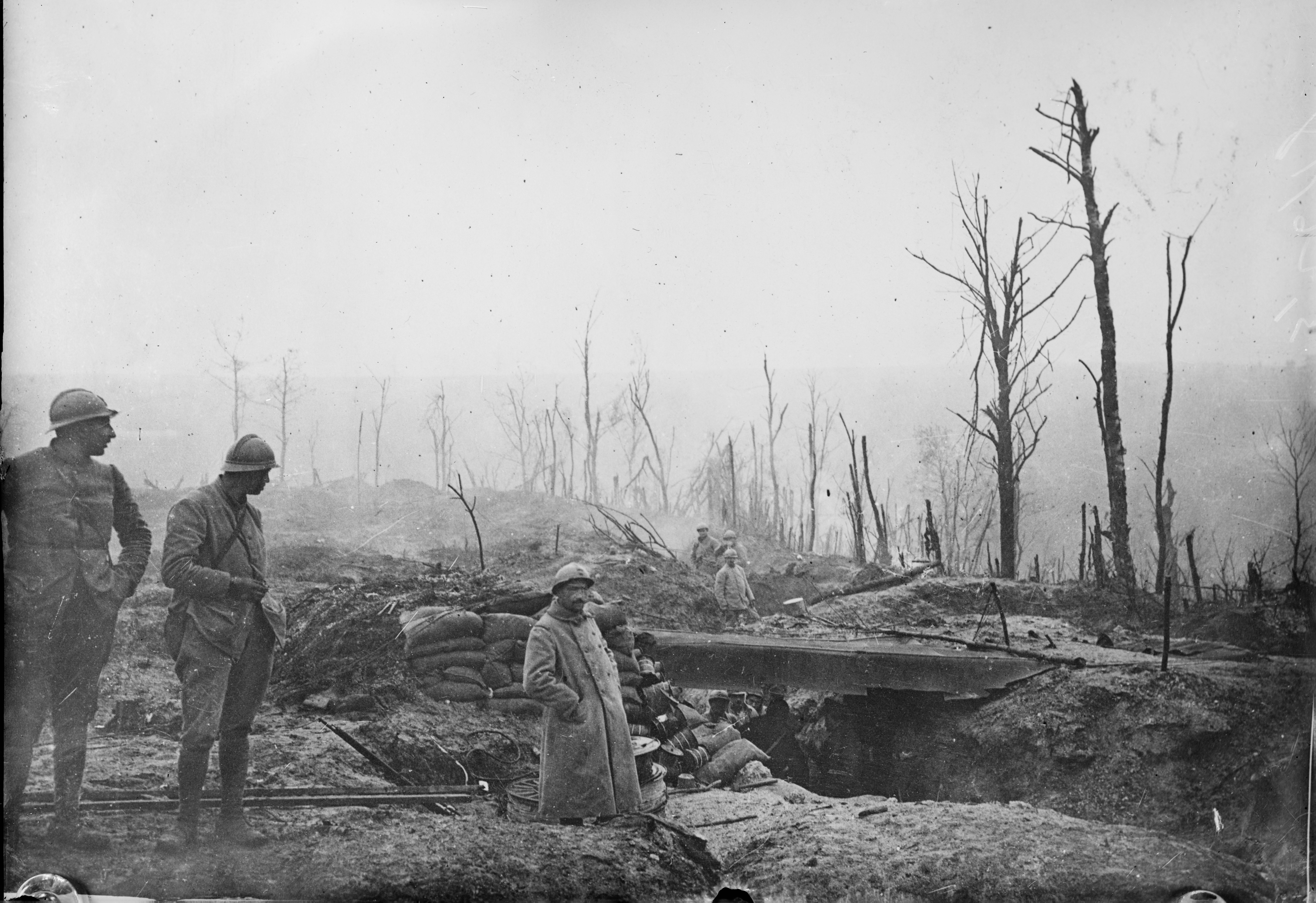
French poilus on a battlefield during the First World War

Around 60 million of the enlisted originated from the European continent, which saw its younger men mobilised on a mass scale. Most of Europe's great powers operated peacetime conscription systems where men were expected to do a brief period of military training in their youth before spending the rest of their lives in the army reserve. Nations with this system saw a huge portion of their manpower directly invested in the conflict: 55% of male Italians and Bulgarians aged 18 to 50 were called to military service. Elsewhere the proportions were even higher: 63% of military-aged men in Serbia, 78% in Austro-Hungary, and 81% of military-aged men in France and Germany served. Britain, which traditionally relied primarily on the Royal Navy for its security, was a notable exception to this rule and did not introduce conscription until 1916. Around 5 million British men fought in the First World War out of a total United Kingdom population of 46 million including women, children, and men too old to bear arms.

Additionally, nations recruited heavily from their colonial empires. Three million men from around the British Empire outside the United Kingdom served in the British Army as soldiers and labourers, while France recruited 475,000 soldiers from its colonies. Other nations involved include the United States which enlisted 4 million men during the conflict and the Ottoman Empire which mobilised 2,850,000 soldiers.

Beyond the extent of the deaths, the war had a profound effect on many of its survivors, giving many young men severe mental health problems and crippling physical disabilities. The war also unsettled many soldiers' sense of reality, who had gone into the conflict with a belief that battle and hardship was a path to redemption and greatness. When years of pain, suffering, and loss seemed to bring about little in the way of a better future, many were left with a profound sense of disillusionment.

==== Young women in the 1910s and 1920s ====
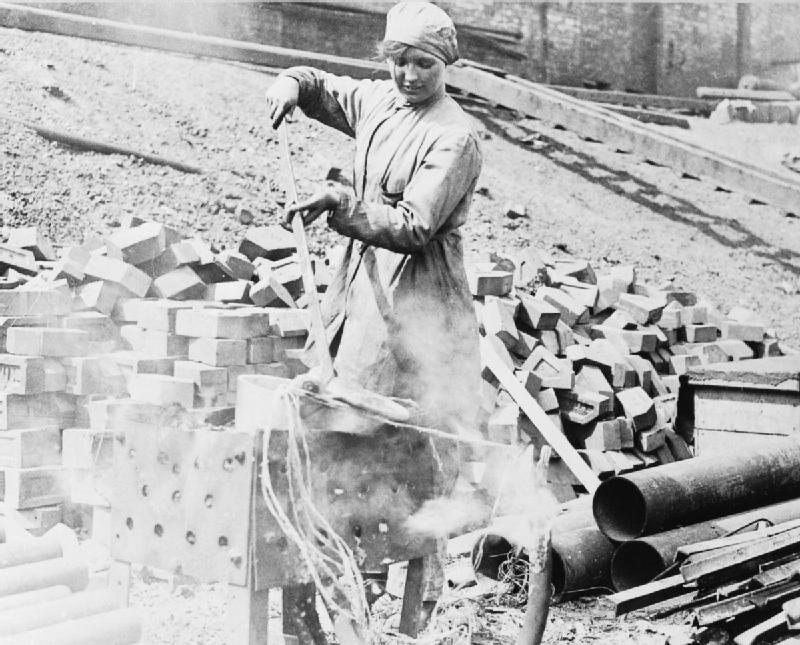
A young woman burning a cable for scrap at a shipbuilding yard in Glasgow during World War I

Though soldiers on the frontlines of the First World War were exclusively men, women contributed to the war effort in other ways. Many took the jobs men had left in previously male-dominated sectors such as heavy industry, while some even took on non-combat military roles. Many, particularly wealthier women, took part in voluntary work to contribute to the war effort or to help those suffering due to it, such as the wounded or refugees. Often they were experiencing manual labour for the first time. However, this reshaping of the female role led to fears that the sexes having the same responsibilities would disrupt the fabric of society and that more competition for work would leave men unemployed and erode their pay. Most women had to exit the employment they had taken during the war as soon as it concluded.

The war also had a personal impact on the lives of female members of the Lost Generation. Many women lost their husbands in the conflict, which frequently meant losing the main breadwinner of the household. However, war widows often received a pension and financial assistance to support their children. Even with some economic support, raising a family alone was often financially difficult and emotionally draining, and women faced losing their pensions if they remarried or were accused of engaging in frowned-upon behaviour. In some cases, grief and other pressures drove widows to alcoholism, depression, or suicide. Additionally, the large number of men killed in the First World War made it harder for many young women who were still single at the start of conflict to get married; this accelerated a trend towards them gaining greater independence and embarking on careers.

Women's gaining of political rights sped up in the Western world after the First World War, while employment opportunities for unmarried women widened. This time period saw the development of a new type of young woman in popular culture known as a flapper, who was known for her rebellion against previous social norms. They had a physically distinctive appearance compared to their predecessors only a few years earlier, cutting their hair into bobs, wearing shorter dresses and more makeup, while taking on a new code of behaviour filled with more recklessness, party-going, and overt sexuality.

==== Aftermath of the First World War ====
The aftermath of the First World War saw substantive changes in the political situation, including a trend towards republicanism, the founding of many new relatively small nation-states which had previously been part of larger empires, and greater suffrage for groups such as the working class and women. France and the United Kingdom both gained territory from their enemies, while the war and the damage it did to the European empires are generally considered major stepping stones in the United States' path to becoming the world's dominant superpower. The German and Italian populations' resentment against what they generally saw as a peace settlement that took too much away from the former or did not give enough to the latter fed into the fascist movements, which would eventually turn those countries into totalitarian dictatorships. For Russia, the years after its revolution in 1917 were plagued by disease, famine, terror, and civil war eventually concluded in the establishment of the Soviet Union.

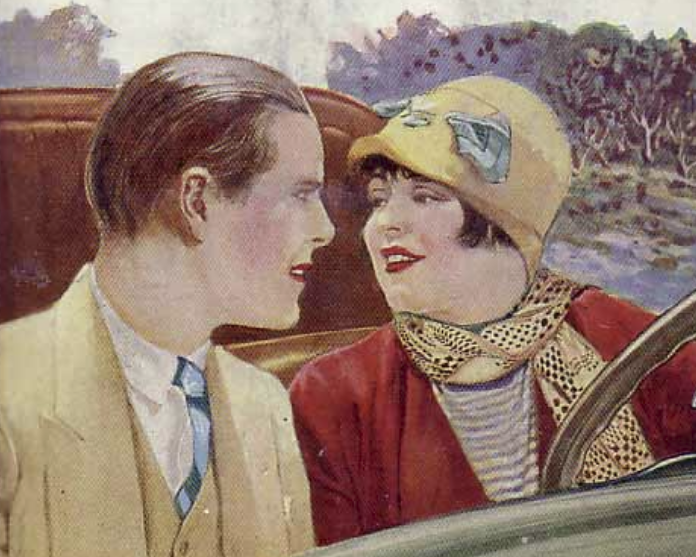
Image taken from a magazine cover (published 1924) of a couple dressed in fashionable clothing of the period

The immediate post-World War One period was characterised by continued political violence and economic instability. The late 1910s saw the Spanish flu pandemic, which was unusual in the sense that it killed many younger adults of the same Lost Generation age group that had mainly died in the war. Later, especially in major cities, much of the 1920s is considered to have been a more prosperous period when the Lost Generation, in particular, escaped the suffering and turmoil they had lived through by rebelling against the social and cultural norms of their elders.

=== In midlife ===
==== 1930s ====
===== Politics and economics =====
This more optimistic period was short-lived, however, as 1929 saw the beginning of the Great Depression, which would continue throughout the 1930s and become the longest and most severe financial downturn ever experienced in Western industrialised history. Though it had begun in the United States, the crises led to sharp increases in worldwide unemployment, reductions in economic output and deflation. The depression was also a major catalyst for the rise of Nazism in Germany and the beginnings of its quest to establish dominance over the European continent, which would eventually lead to World War II in Europe. Additionally, the 1930s saw the less badly damaged Imperial Japan engage in its own empire-building, contributing to conflict in the Far East, where some scholars have argued the Second World War began as early as 1931.

===== Popular media =====
The 1930s saw rising popularity for radio, with the vast majority of Western households having access to the medium by the end of the decade. Instant communication, first made possible by the short messages provided using the telegraph, became more detailed since radio signals could be translated to sound. Programming included soap operas, music, and sport. Educational broadcasts were frequently available. The airwaves also provided a source of news and, particularly for the era's autocratic regimes, an outlet for political propaganda.

==== Second World War ====
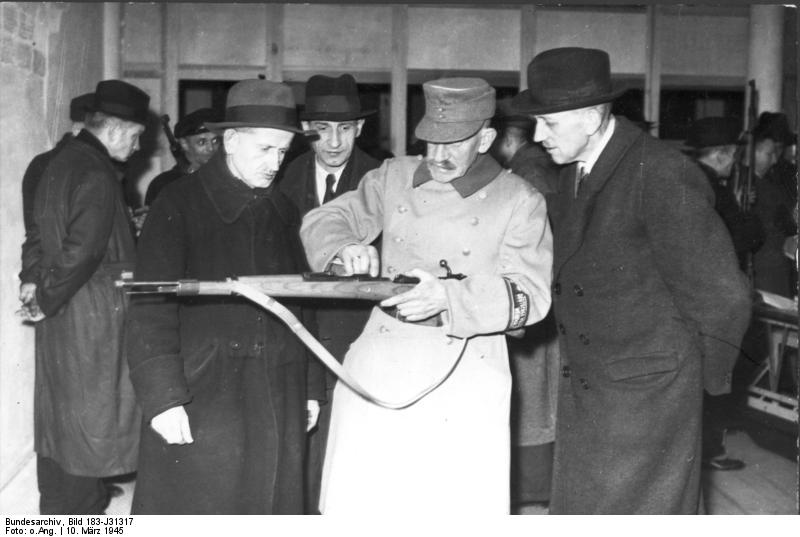
Weapons training for members of the Volkssturm, a militia formed of German men not already sworn into military service. Men up to the age of sixty were obliged to join in the final months of World War II.

When World War II broke out in 1939, the Lost Generation faced a major global conflict for the second time in their lifetime, and now often had to watch their sons go to the battlefield. The place of the older generation who had been young adults during World War I in the new conflict was a theme in popular media of the time period, with examples including Waterloo Bridge and Old Bill and Son. Civil defence organisations designed to provide a final line of resistance against invasion and assist in home defence more broadly recruited heavily from the older male population. As in the First World War, women helped to make up for labour shortages caused by mass military recruitment by entering more traditionally masculine employment and entering the conflict more directly in female military branches and underground resistance movements. However, those in middle age were generally less likely to become involved in this kind of work than the young. This was particularly true of any kind of military involvement.

=== In later life ===
In the West, the Lost Generation tended to reach the end of their working lives around the 1950s and 1960s. For those members of the cohort who had fought in World War I, their military service frequently was viewed as a defining moment in their lives even many years later. Retirement notices of this era often included information on a man's service in the First World War.

Though there were slight differences between individual countries and from one year to the next, the average life expectancy in the developed world during the 1950s, 1960s and early 1970s was typically around seventy years old. However, some members of the Lost Generation outlived the norm by several decades. Nabi Tajima, the last surviving person known to have been born in the 19th century, died in 2018. The final remaining veteran to have served in World War I in any capacity was Florence Green, who died in 2012, while Claude Choules, the last veteran to have been involved in combat, had died the previous year. However, these individuals were born in 1902 and 1901 respectively, putting them outside the usual birth years for the Lost Generation.

== In literature ==
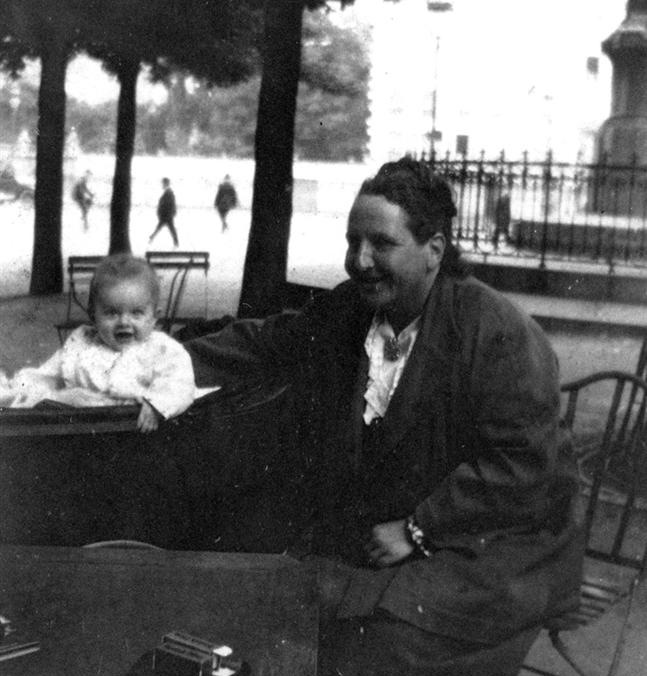
Gertrude Stein with Ernest Hemingway's son Jack in 1924. Stein is credited with bringing the term "Lost Generation" into use.

In his memoir A Moveable Feast (1964), published after Hemingway's and Stein's deaths, Ernest Hemingway writes that Gertrude Stein heard the phrase from a French garage owner who serviced Stein's car. When a young mechanic failed to repair the car quickly enough, the garage owner shouted at the young man, "You are all a 'génération perdue'." While telling Hemingway the story, Stein added: "That is what you are. That's what you all are ... all of you young people who served in the war. You are a lost generation." Hemingway thus credits the phrase to Stein, who was then his mentor and patron.

The 1926 publication of Hemingway's The Sun Also Rises popularised the term; that novel serves to epitomise the post-war expatriate generation. However, Hemingway later wrote to his editor Max Perkins that the "point of the book" was not so much about a generation being lost, but that "the earth abideth forever". Hemingway believed the characters in The Sun Also Rises may have been "battered" but were not lost.

Consistent with this ambivalence, Hemingway employs "Lost Generation" as one of two contrasting epigraphs for his novel. In A Moveable Feast, Hemingway writes, "I tried to balance Miss Stein's quotation from the garage owner with one from Ecclesiastes." A few lines later, recalling the risks and losses of the war, he adds: "I thought of Miss Stein and Sherwood Anderson and egotism and mental laziness versus discipline and I thought 'who is calling who a lost generation?'"

=== Themes ===
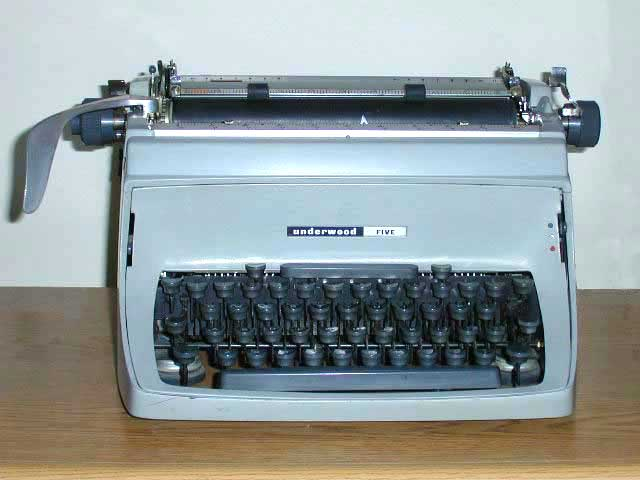
Typewriters entered common use as a writing tool for the Lost Generation.

The writings of the Lost Generation literary figures often pertained to the writers' experiences in World War I and the years following it. It is said that the work of these writers was autobiographical based on their use of mythologised versions of their lives. One of the themes that commonly appear in the authors' works is decadence and the frivolous lifestyle of the wealthy. Both Hemingway and F. Scott Fitzgerald touched on this theme throughout the novels The Sun Also Rises and The Great Gatsby. Another theme commonly found in the works of these authors was the death of the American Dream, which is exhibited throughout many of their novels. It is particularly prominent in The Great Gatsby, in which the character Nick Carraway comes to realise the corruption that surrounds him.

=== Notable figures ===
Notable writers of the Lost Generation include American novelist F. Scott Fitzgerald, American novelist Thomas Wolfe, American novelist and art collector Gertrude Stein, American novelist Ernest Hemingway, American poet Dorothy Parker, American-British poet and playwright T. S. Eliot, American poet and critic Ezra Pound, British novelist Jean Rhys, American painter and illustrator Henry Strater, and American bookseller and publisher Sylvia Beach.

== See also ==
- Aftermath of World War I
- Belle Époque
- Edwardian era
- Fin de siècle
- Gay Nineties
- List of named generations
- Roaring Twenties
- World War I

Preceded by Missionary Generation; Prior to 1883	Lost Generation; 1883 – 1900	Succeeded by Greatest Generation; 1901 – 1927
