= Strauss–Howe generational theory =

Theory of generational cycles

The Strauss–Howe generational theory, devised by William Strauss and Neil Howe, describes a theorized recurring generation cycle in American and Western history in which historical events are associated with recurring generational personas called archetypes. Each generational persona unleashes a new era (called a "turning") lasting around 21 years, in which a new social, political, and economic climate ("mood") exists. They are part of a larger cyclical "saeculum", a long human life, which usually spans around 85 years, although some saecula have lasted longer.

The theory states that a crisis recurs in American history after every saeculum, which is followed by a recovery ("high"). During this recovery, institutions and communitarian values are strong. Ultimately, succeeding generational archetypes attack and weaken institutions in the name of autonomy and individualism, which eventually creates a tumultuous political environment that ripens conditions for another crisis.

Academic response to the theory has been mixed, with some applauding Strauss and Howe for their "bold and imaginative thesis", while others have criticized the theory as being overly deterministic, unfalsifiable, and unsupported by rigorous evidence. The theory has also been described by some historians and journalists as pseudoscientific, "kooky", and "an elaborate historical horoscope that will never withstand scholarly scrutiny". Academic criticism has focused on the lack of rigorous empirical evidence for their claims, as well as the authors' view that generational groupings are more powerful than other social groupings, such as economic class, race/ethnicity, sex, religion, culture, and political affiliation.

== History ==
William Strauss and Neil Howe's partnership began in the late 1980s when they began writing their first book Generations, which discusses the history of the United States as a succession of generational biographies. Each had written on generational topics previously. The authors' interest in generations as a broader topic emerged after they met in Washington, D.C.; they began discussing the connections between each of their previous works.

External videos
- Booknotes interview with Howe and Strauss on Generations, April 14, 1991, C-SPAN
- Discussion with Howe and Strauss on The Fourth Turning, April 17, 1998, C-SPAN

They attempted to find the reason why the Baby boomers and the G.I. Generation had developed such different ways of looking at the world, and what it was about these generations' experiences growing up that prompted their different outlooks. They also wanted to find patterns in previous generations, and their research discussed historical analogs to the current generations. They ultimately described a recurring pattern in the Anglo-American history of four generational types, each with a distinct collective persona, and a corresponding cycle of four different types of eras, each with a distinct "mood".

Strauss and Howe laid the groundwork for their theory in their book Generations: The History of America's Future, 1584 to 2069 (1991), which discusses the history of the United States as a series of generational biographies going back to 1584. The theory was expanded in The Fourth Turning (1997), to focus on a fourfold cycle of generational types and recurring mood eras to describe the history of the United States, including the Thirteen Colonies and their British antecedents. However, the authors have also examined generational trends elsewhere in the world and described similar cycles in several developed countries. The terminology for generational archetypes was updated (e.g. "Civics" became "Heroes", which they applied to the Millennial Generation, "Adaptives" became "Artists"), and the terms "Turning" and "Saeculum" were introduced. In July 2023, Howe released a follow-up book, titled The Fourth Turning Is Here.

In 1993, Strauss and Howe released their second book 13th Gen: Abort, Retry, Ignore, Fail?, examining Generation X (who the authors called "13ers", describing them as the thirteenth generation since the US became a nation) who were then teenagers and young adults. The book asserts that 13ers' location in history as under-protected children during the Sexual Revolution explains their pragmatic attitude. They describe Gen Xers as growing up during a time when society was less focused on children and more focused on adults and their self-actualization.

Strauss and Howe's theory made various predictions regarding Millennials, a generation consisting of young children at the time. In Generations (1991) and The Fourth Turning (1997), the two authors discussed the generation gap between Baby boomers and their parents and predicted there would be no such gap between Millennials and their elders. In 2000, they published Millennials Rising: The Next Great Generation, asserting that Millennial teens were recasting the image of youth from "downbeat and alienated to upbeat and engaged", crediting increased parental attention and protection for these positive changes. The authors predicted that over the following decade, Millennials could emerge as the next "Great Generation".

In the mid-1990s, Strauss and Howe began receiving inquiries about how their research could be applied to strategic problems in organizations. They started speaking frequently about their work at events and conferences.

== Defining a generation ==
Strauss and Howe describe the history of the U.S. as a succession of Anglo-American generational biographies from 1433 to the present, and theorized a recurring generational cycle in American history. The authors posit a pattern of four repeating phases, generational types, and a recurring cycle of spiritual awakenings and secular crises, from the founding colonials of America through the present day.

Strauss and Howe define a social generation as the aggregate of all people born over a span of roughly 21 years or about the length of one phase of life: childhood, young adulthood, midlife, and old age. Generations are identified (from the first birthyear to last) by looking for cohort groups of this length that share three criteria. First, members of a generation share what the authors call an age location in history: they encounter key historical events and social trends while occupying the same phase of life. In this view, members of a generation are shaped in lasting ways by the eras they encounter as children and young adults and they share certain common beliefs and behaviors. Aware of the experiences and traits that they share with their peers, members of a generation would also share a sense of common perceived membership in that generation.

They based their definition of a generation on the work of various writers and social thinkers, from ancient writers such as Polybius and Ibn Khaldun to modern social theorists such as José Ortega y Gasset, Karl Mannheim, John Stuart Mill, Émile Littré, Auguste Comte, and François Mentré.

=== Turnings ===
While writing Generations, Strauss and Howe described a theorized pattern in the historical generations they examined, which they say revolved around generational events which they call turnings. In Generations, and in greater detail in The Fourth Turning, they describe a four-stage cycle of social or mood eras which they call "turnings". The turnings include: "the high", "the awakening", "the unraveling", and "the crisis".

==== High ====
According to Strauss and Howe, the first turning is a high, which occurs after a crisis. During the high, institutions are strong and individualism is weak. Society is confident about where it wants to go collectively, though those outside the majoritarian center often feel stifled by conformity.

According to the authors, the most recent first turning in the US was the post–World War II American high, beginning in 1946 and ending with the assassination of John F. Kennedy on November 22, 1963.

==== Awakening ====
According to the theory, the second turning is an awakening. This is an era when institutions are attacked in the name of personal and spiritual autonomy. Just when society is reaching its high tide of public progress, people suddenly tire of social discipline and want to recapture a sense of "self-awareness", "spirituality" and "personal authenticity". Young activists look back at the previous High as an era of cultural and spiritual poverty.

Strauss and Howe say the U.S.'s most recent awakening was the "consciousness revolution", which spanned from the campus and inner-city revolts of the mid-1960s to the tax revolts of the early 1980s.

==== Unraveling ====
According to Strauss and Howe, the third turning is an unraveling. The mood of this era they say is in many ways the opposite of a high: Institutions are weak and distrusted, while individualism is strong and flourishing. The authors say highs come after crises when society wants to coalesce and build and avoid the death and destruction of the previous crisis. Unravelings come after awakenings when society wants to atomize and enjoy. They say the most recent unraveling in the US began in the 1980s and includes the long boom and the culture war.

==== Crisis ====
According to the authors, the fourth turning is a crisis. This is an era of destruction, often involving war or revolution, in which institutional life is destroyed and rebuilt in response to a perceived threat to the nation's survival. After the crisis, civic authority revives, cultural expression redirects toward community purpose, and people begin to locate themselves as members of a larger group.

The authors say the previous fourth turning in the US began with the Wall Street Crash of 1929 and climaxed with the end of World War II. The G.I. Generation (which they call a hero archetype, born 1901 to 1924) came of age during this era. They say their confidence, optimism, and collective outlook epitomized the mood of that era. The authors assert the millennial generation, which they also describe as a hero archetype, born 1982 to 2005, shows many similar traits to those of the G.I. youth, which they describe as including rising civic engagement, improving behavior, and collective confidence.

=== Cycle ===
The authors describe each turning as lasting circa 21 years. Four turnings make up a full cycle of circa 85 years, which the authors term a saeculum, after the Latin word meaning both "a long human life" and "a natural century".

Generational change drives the cycle of turnings and determines its periodicity. As each generation ages into the next life phase (and a new social role) society's mood and behavior fundamentally change, giving rise to a new turning. Historical events shape generations in childhood and young adulthood; then, as parents and leaders in midlife and old age, generations in turn shape history.

Each of the four turnings has a distinct "mood" that recurs every saeculum. Strauss and Howe describe these turnings as the "seasons of history". At one extreme is the Awakening, which is analogous to summer, and at the other extreme is the Crisis, which is analogous to winter. The High and the Unraveling are similar to spring and autumn, respectively. Strauss and Howe have discussed 26 theorized turnings over 7 saecula in Anglo-American history, from the year 1433 to today.

The core of Strauss and Howe's ideas is a basic alternation between two different types of eras, Crises and Awakenings. Both of these are defining eras in which people observe that historic events are radically altering their social environment. Crises are periods marked by major secular upheaval, when society focuses on reorganizing the outer world of institutions and public behavior. They say the last American Crisis was the period spanning the Great Depression and World War II. Awakenings are periods marked by cultural or religious renewal when society focuses on changing the inner world of values and private behavior. The last American Awakening was the "Consciousness Revolution" of the 1960s and 1970s.

During Crises, an ethic of collectivism emerges. During Awakenings, an ethic of individualism emerges, and the institutional order is attacked by new social ideals and spiritual agendas. According to the authors, about every 85 years—the length of a long human life—a national Crisis occurs in American society. Roughly halfway to the next Crisis, a cultural Awakening occurs. Historically, these have often been called Great Awakenings.

In describing this cycle of Crises and Awakenings, they draw from the work of other historians and social scientists who have also discussed long cycles in American and European history, which have grown to show a trend of economic downturns the more a society has industrialised. The cycle of Crises corresponds with long cycles of war identified by such scholars as Arnold J. Toynbee, Quincy Wright, and L. L. Ferrar Jr., and with geopolitical cycles identified by William R. Thompson and George Modelski. Strauss and Howe say their cycle of Awakenings corresponds with Anthony Wallace's work on revitalization movements. They also say recurring Crises and Awakenings correspond with two-stroke cycles in politics (Walter Dean Burnham, Arthur Schlesinger Sr. and Jr.), foreign affairs (Frank L. Klingberg), and the economy (Nikolai Kondratieff) and long-term oscillations in crime and substance abuse.

=== Archetypes ===
The authors say two different types of eras and two formative age locations associated with them (childhood and young adulthood) produce four generational archetypes that repeat sequentially, in rhythm with the cycle of Crises and Awakenings. In Generations, they refer to these four archetypes as Idealist, Reactive, Civic, and Adaptive. In The Fourth Turning (1997) they change this terminology to Prophet, Nomad, Hero, and Artist.

They say the generations in each archetype share a similar age-location in history, and share some basic attitudes towards family, risk, culture and values, and civic engagement. In essence, generations shaped by similar early-life experiences develop similar collective personas and follow similar life trajectories. To date, Strauss and Howe have described 25 generations in Anglo-American history, each with a corresponding archetype. The authors describe the archetypes as follows:

==== Prophet ====
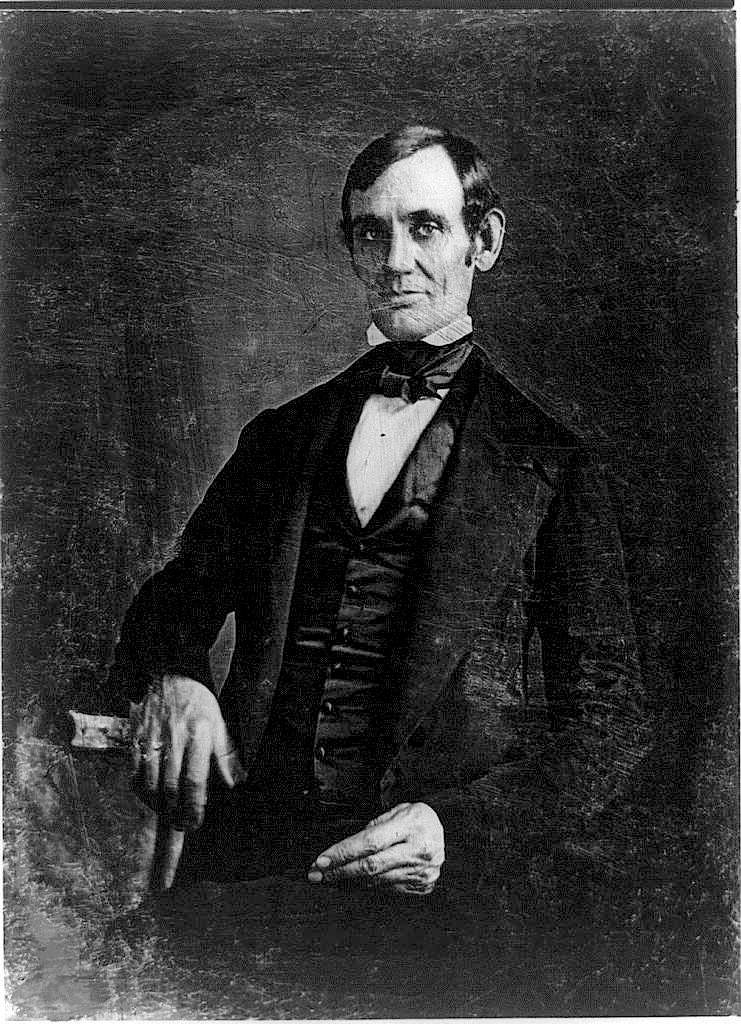
Abraham Lincoln, born in 1809. Strauss and Howe identified him as a member of the Transcendental generation.

Prophet (Idealist) generations enter childhood during a High, a time of rejuvenated community life and consensus around a new societal order. Examples: Transcendental Generation, Missionary Generation, Baby Boomers.

==== Nomad ====
Nomad (Reactive) generations enter childhood during an Awakening, a time of social ideals and spiritual agendas when young adults are passionately attacking the established institutional order. Examples: Gilded Generation, Lost Generation, Generation X.

==== Hero ====
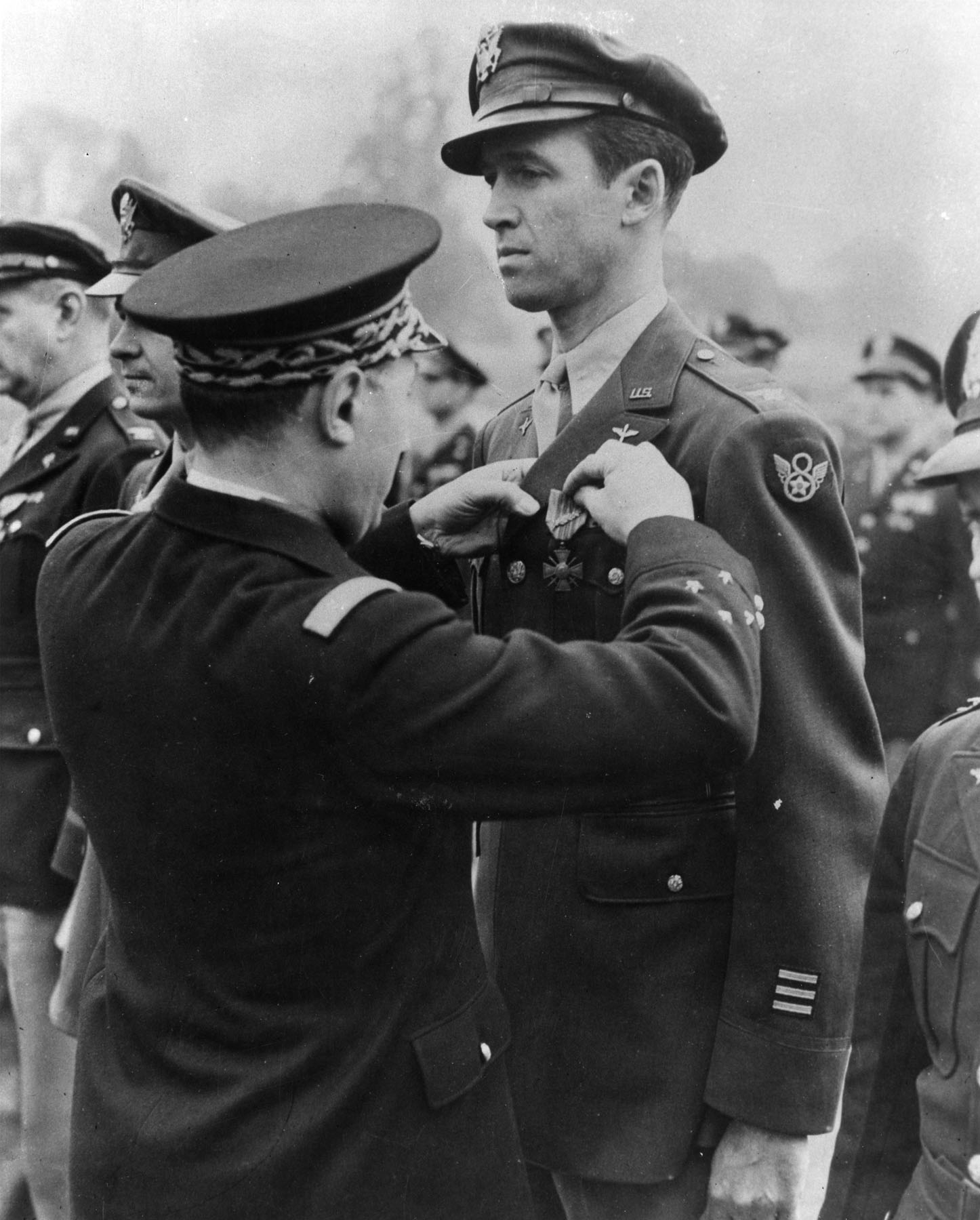
Young adults fighting in World War II were born in the early part of the 20th century, like actor Colonel James Stewart (b. 1908). They are part of the G.I. Generation, which follows the Hero archetype.

Hero (Civic) generations enter childhood during an Unraveling, a time of individual pragmatism, self-reliance, and unrestrained individualism. Examples: Republican Generation, G.I. Generation, Millennials.

==== Artist ====
Artist (Adaptive) generations enter childhood during a Crisis, a time when public consensus, aggressive institutions, and an ethic of personal sacrifice were favored. Examples: Progressive Generation, Silent Generation, Homeland Generation.

=== Summary ===
- An average modern life is around 85 years and consists of four periods of ~21 years
  - Childhood → Young adult → Midlife → Elderhood
- A generation is an aggregate of people born every ~21 years
  - Baby Boomers → Gen X → Millennials → Homelanders
- Each generation experiences "four turnings" every ~85 years
  - High → Awakening → Unraveling → Crisis
- A generation is considered "dominant" or "recessive" according to the turning experienced as young adults. But as a youth generation comes of age and defines its collective persona an opposing generational archetype is in its midlife peak of power.
  - Dominant: independent behavior + attitudes in defining an era
  - Recessive: dependent role in defining an era
- Dominant generations
  - Prophet (idealist): Awakening as young adults. Awakening, defined: Institutions are attacked in the name of personal and spiritual autonomy
  - Hero (civic): Crisis as young adults. Crisis, defined: Institutional life is destroyed and rebuilt in response to a perceived threat to the nation's survival
- Recessive generations
  - Nomad (reactive): Unravelling as young adults. Unravelling, defined: Institutions are weak and distrusted, individualism is strong and flourishing
  - Artist (adaptive): High as young adults. High, defined: Institutions are strong, and individualism is weak

The Life Stages of the Generations
| Turning | Childhood | YA-hood | Midlife | Elderhood |
|---|---|---|---|---|
| High | Prophet | Artist | Hero | Nomad |
| Awakening | Nomad | Prophet | Artist | Hero |
| Unraveling | Hero | Nomad | Prophet | Artist |
| Crisis | Artist | Hero | Nomad | Prophet |

What's in each Turning
| Turning | Institutions | Individualism |
|---|---|---|
| High | Strong | Low |
| Awakening | Torn down | Increasing |
| Unraveling | Weak | High |
| Crisis | Built up | Decreasing |

== Generations ==
=== Late Medieval Saeculum ===
==== Arthurian Generation ====
The arthurian generation was born between 1433 and 1460 and is of the hero archetype. Members of the generation grew up during England's retreat from the Hundred Years' War in France, during an era of rising civil unrest.

==== Humanist Generation ====
The humanist generation was born between 1461 and 1482 and is of the artist/adaptive archetype.

This generation grew up at the height of the Middle Ages, just prior to the Reformation and Renaissance. The educated middle classes are influenced by Renaissance Humanist teaching and presented with a clear career path through the church or State bureaucracy. Humanist influences took hold across Europe, and in a number of ways prepared the intellectual landscape for the coming reformation. Their youth coincided with the development of the European Printing press allowing greater dissemination of knowledge.

According to Strauss and Howe, they became Greek language tutors, international scholars, poets, prelates, and literate merchants and yeomen. They described their education produced by the humanist generation as being focused on the qualitative and the subjective, rather than the quantitative and the objective.

Some of the notable people who influenced this generation include Thomas More, Erasmus, Thomas Linacre, John Colet, Cardinal Wolsey, Michelangelo, Copernicus, Francisco Pizarro and Cesare Borgia. King Edward V was also born into this generation, but as he died at only 15 years old, it is difficult to properly place him in this archetype. However, according to the historian Dominic Mancini Edward was fascinated with science and philosophy, and was well learned beyond his years.

=== Reformation Saeculum ===
==== Reformation Generation ====
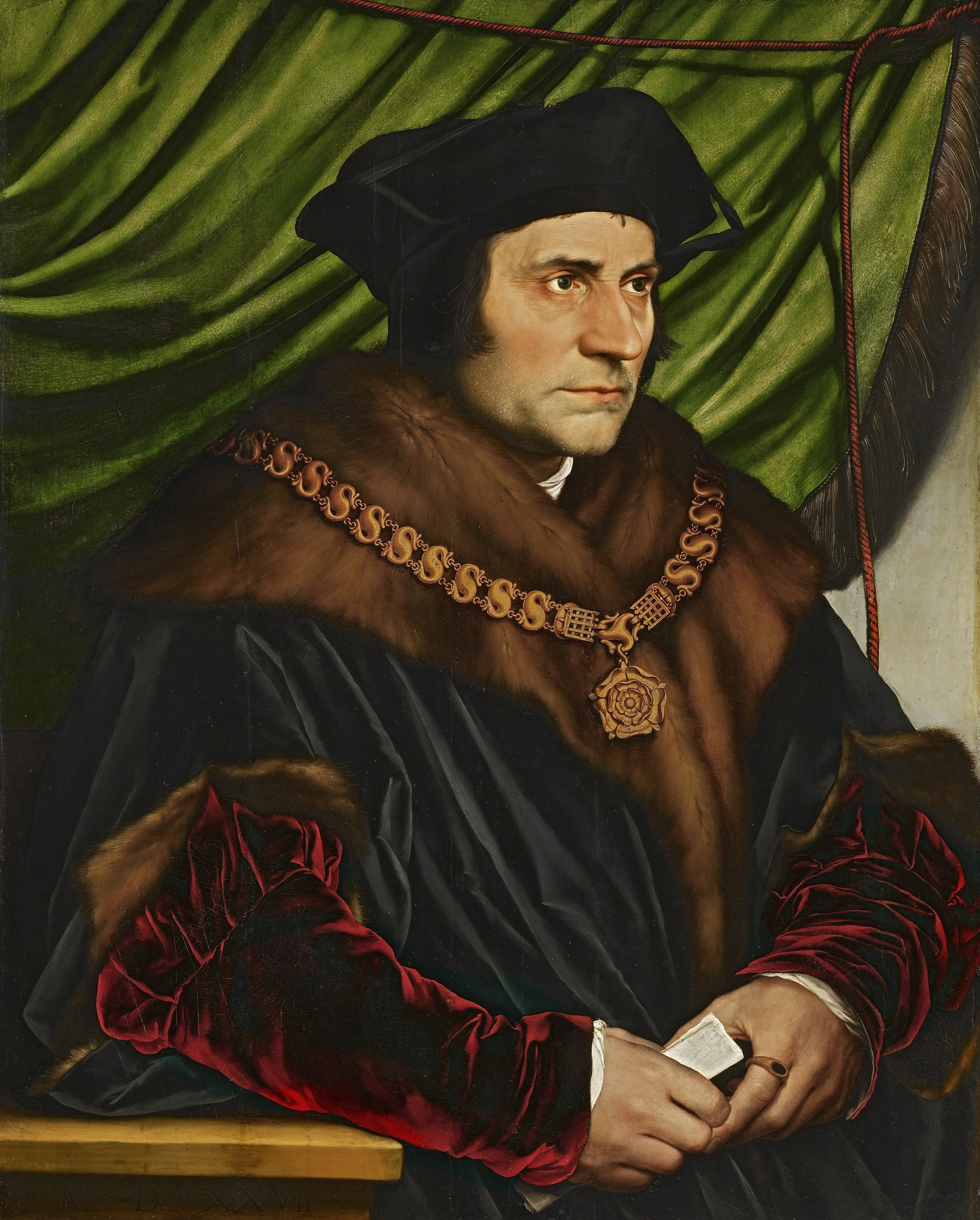
Sir Thomas More (1527) by Hans Holbein the Younger

The reformation generation was born between 1483 and 1511 and is of the prophet archetype. This generation rebelled as youths, prompting the first colleges in the 1520s.

==== Reprisal Generation ====
The reprisal generation was born between 1512 and 1540 and is of the nomad/reactive archetype. They grew up during the wars of the Spanish Armada and saw the expansion of British territories and colonization in the New World overseas.

==== Elizabethan Generation ====
The Elizabethan generation was born between 1541 and 1565 and is of the hero archetype. They benefited as children from growth in academies. They grew up during the Anglo-Spanish War (1585–1604). They regulated commerce, explored overseas empires, built English country houses, pursued science, and wrote poetry that celebrated an orderly universe.

==== Parliamentary Generation ====
The parliamentary generation was born between 1566 and 1587 and is of the artist archetype. They grew up during an era of foreign threats and war. They built credentials in law, scholarship, religion, and arts and crafts guilds.

=== New World Saeculum ===
==== Puritan Generation ====
The puritan generation was born between 1588 and 1617 and is of the prophet archetype. Members of the generation were led through the Wars of the Three Kingdoms (1639–1651) by King Charles I and others led a large migration to the Americas. The generation was very religious.

==== Cavalier Generation ====
The cavalier generation was born from 1618 to 1647 and was of the nomad archetype. Members of this generation grew up in an era of religious upheaval and family collapse. Their generation was notoriously violent and uneducated, causing men to take great risks, and resulting in many young deaths.

Their generation acted in some ways in reaction against the harsh piety and frugality of the puritans, with a more laissez-faire social attitude. This was the time of Merry Old England and the zeitgeist of this generation was possibly best displayed by king Charles II.

==== Glorious Generation ====
The glorious generation was born from 1648 to 1673 and was of the hero archetype. They had a protected childhood with tax-supported schools and new laws discouraging the kidnapping of young people. After participating in the Indian Wars and the Glorious Revolution, they became involved in the electoral office at a young age. As young adults, they took pride in the growing political, commercial, and scientific achievements of England. They designed insurance, paper money, and public works.

==== Enlightenment Generation ====
The enlightenment generation' was born between 1674 and 1700 and was of the artist archetype. They grew up as protected children when families were close, youth risk discouraged, and good educations and well-connected marriages highly prized. As adults, they provided America's first large cadre of credentialed professionals, political managers, and plantation administrators. Examples in Europe include George II of Great Britain, Voltaire, George Frederic Handel, Nicholas Amhurst, Antonio Vivaldi, Domenico Scarlatti, and Johann Sebastian Bach.

=== Revolutionary Saeculum ===
==== Awakening Generation ====
The awakening generation was born between 1701 and 1723 and was of the prophet archetype. They were the first colonial generation to consist mostly of the offspring of native-born parents. As adults, they attacked their elders' moral complacency. Benjamin Franklin was born in this generation.

==== Liberty Generation ====
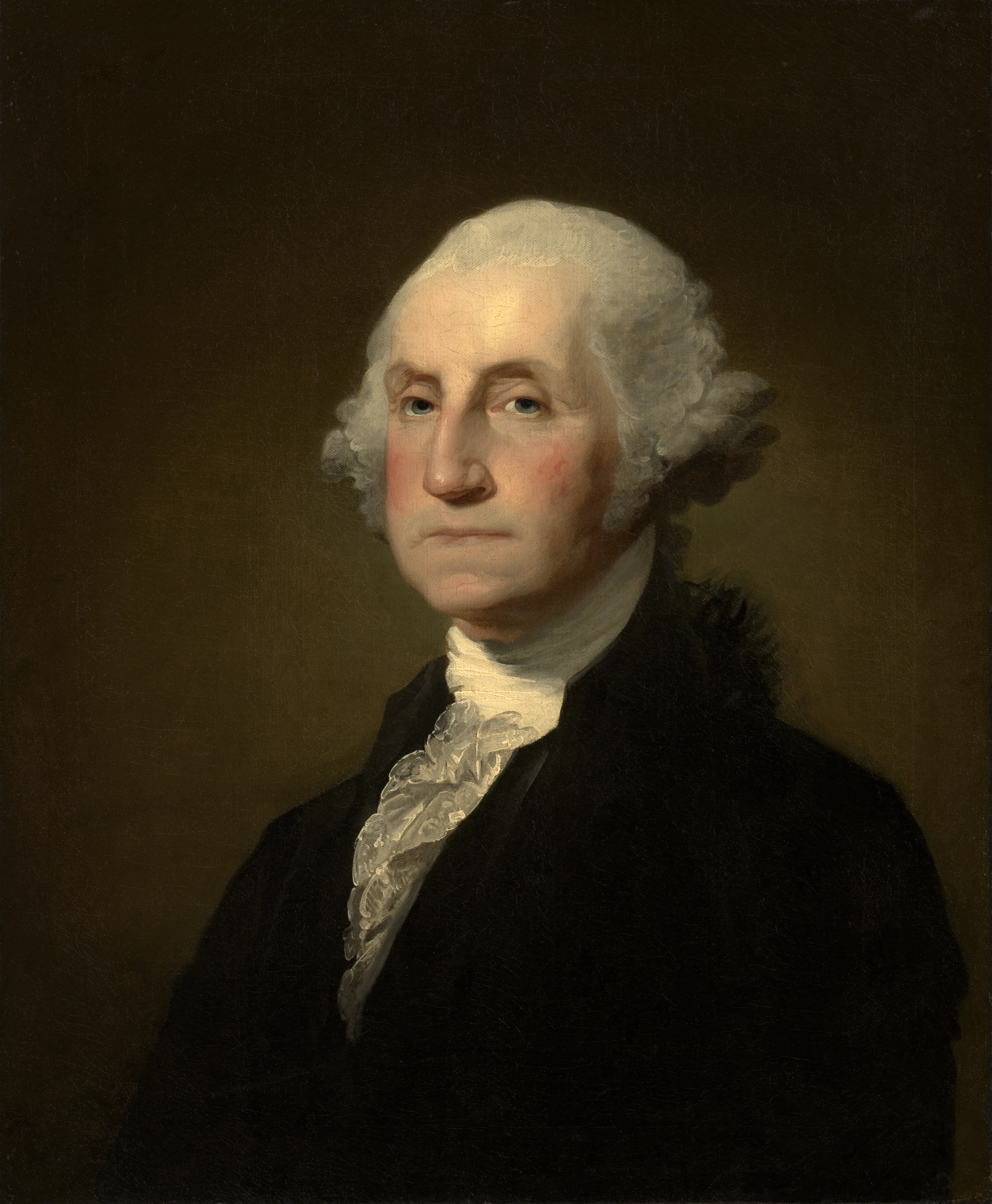
A portrait of George Washington

Strauss and Howe define the liberty generation (nomad archetype) as those born between 1724 and 1741. The first two U.S. Presidents, George Washington and John Adams, were born during this period. Also born in this era were 35 out of the 56 signatories of the United States Declaration of Independence.

==== Republican Generation ====
The republican generation (hero archetype) was born between 1742 and 1766. This generation is known for participating in several global revolutionary movements during the Age of Revolution. This generation witnessed political turmoil in response to the widespread expansion of European imperialism and the vast social inequalities exacerbated by ruthless competition between rival empires in Europe, the Americas and Asia.

They came of age during a time when the viability of mercantilism and imperialism was being questioned both in Europe and the Americas. Relying on Enlightenment philosophy, they unleashed violent episodes of revolution, vilified Monarchy, and promoted Republicanism. In colonial America, they participated in the American Revolutionary War, secured America's independence from British rule, and established the American government.

Many Founding Fathers and leading figures in the early years of the independent United States belong to this generation, including U.S. presidents Thomas Jefferson, James Madison, and James Monroe, as well as the leading figures of the French Revolution such as Maximilien Robespierre, Georges Danton, and Camille Desmoulins.

==== Compromise Generation ====
The compromise generation was born between 1767 and 1791 and was of the artist archetype. They "rocked in the cradle of the Revolution" as they watched brave adults struggle and triumph. Notable persons affiliated with this generation include Andrew Jackson, Napoleon Bonaparte, Simón Bolívar, and Jane Austen.

=== Civil War Saeculum ===
==== Transcendental Generation ====
The transcendental generation (prophet archetype) was born between 1792 and 1821. They started the Second Great Awakening across the United States. Notable people belonging to this generation include Abraham Lincoln and Edgar Allan Poe.

==== Gilded Generation ====
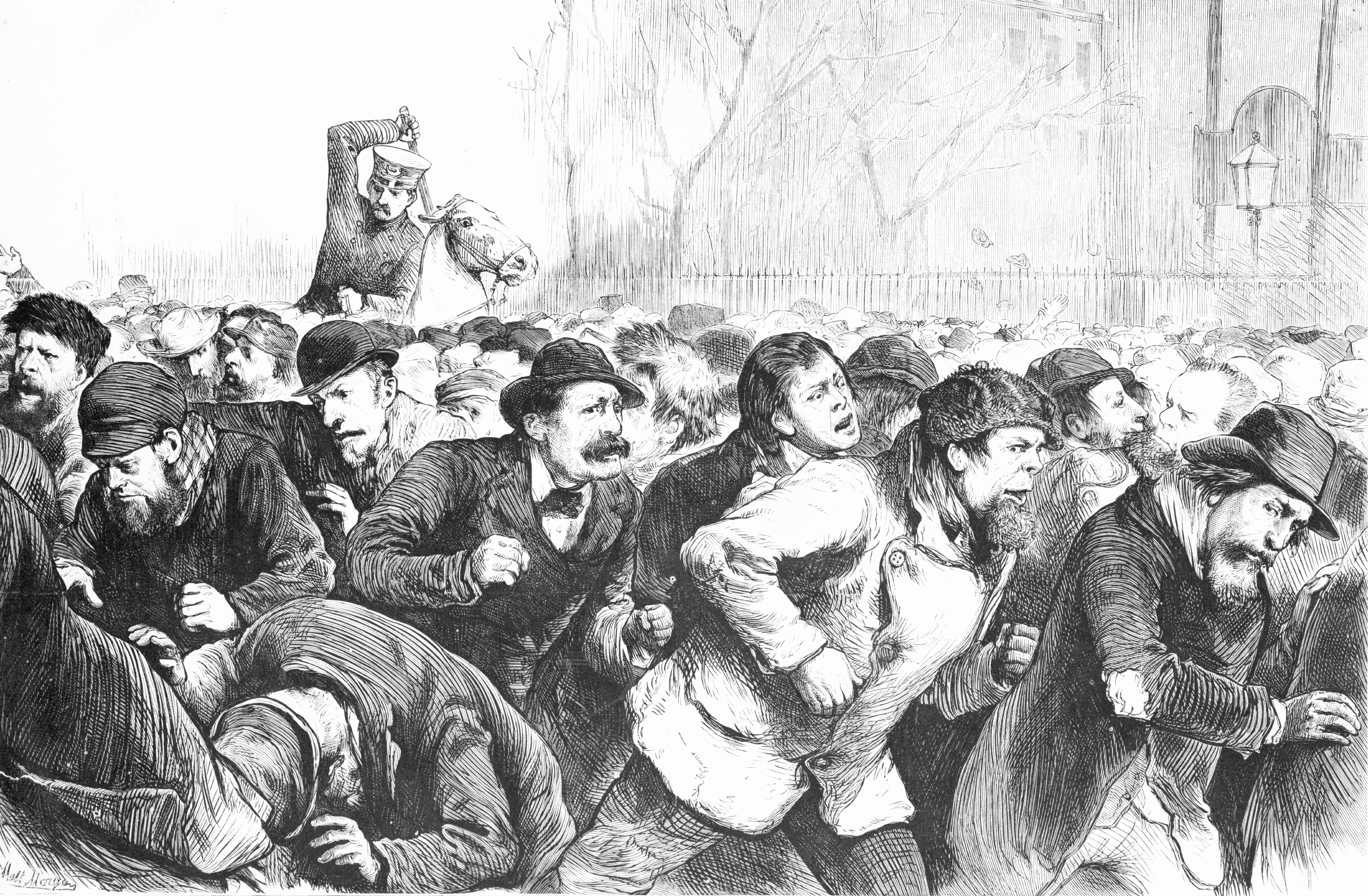
New York police violently attacking unemployed workers in Tompkins Square Park, 1874

Strauss and Howe define the gilded generation (nomad archetype) as those born from 1822 to 1842. They came of age during rising national tempers, torrential immigration, rampant commercialism and consumerism, declining college enrollment, and economic disputes. This led to a distrust of zealotry and institutional involvement, shifting focus to a life of materialism.. Most of the American Civil War soldiers were born during this period (the average age was 26).

==== Progressive Generation ====
The progressive generation (hero and artist archetypes) was born from 1843 to 1859 and grew up during or fought in the American Civil War. This generation is fully ancestral, with the last known member of the progressive generation, the British Ada Roe, having died on January 11, 1970, at 111 years of age.

=== Great Power Saeculum ===
==== Missionary Generation ====
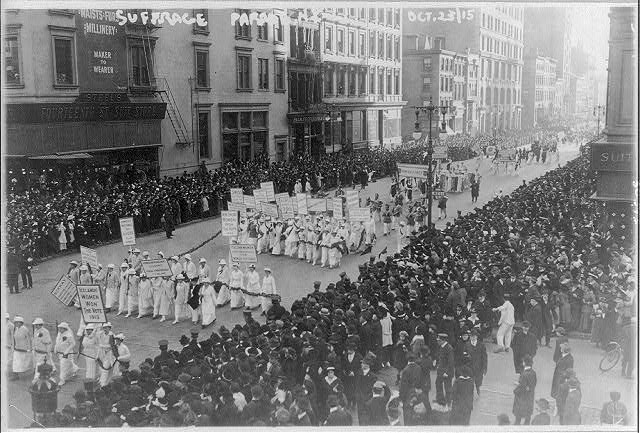
Suffragists marching in New York, 1915. Social Crusades were a defining feature.

The missionary generation was born from 1860 to 1882 and is of the prophet/idealist archetype. Members of the missionary generation have been described as the "home-and-hearth children of the post-Civil War era". They were an idealist generation and as young adults; their leaders were famous preachers. Some were graduates of newly formed black and women's colleges. Their defining characteristics were missionary and social crusades: "muckraker" journalism, prohibitionism, workers' rights, trade unionism and women's suffrage. In midlife, they developed prohibition in the United States, immigration control, and organized vice squads.

Because the Lost Generation were severely impacted by World War I, the leadership of the missionary generation lasted longer than previous generations, giving the US Presidency four members of this generation from Harding to FDR. Leading the country through the Roaring Twenties, Great Depression and World War II alike, and in the 1930s and 1940s, their elite became the "wise old men" who enacted a "New Deal" and Social Security, led during World War II, and reaffirmed America's highest ideals during this period. This generation is fully ancestral, with the last known member of the missionary generation, the American Sarah Knauss, having died on December 30, 1999, at 119 years of age.

==== Lost Generation ====
The Lost Generation (nomad archetype) is the generation that came of age during World War I. "Lost" in this context also means "disoriented, wandering, directionless"—a recognition that there was great confusion and aimlessness among the war's survivors in the early post-war years. Strauss and Howe define the cohort as individuals born between 1883 and 1900. Like the previous generation, the Lost Generation is fully ancestral, with the last known member of the Lost Generation, the Japanese Nabi Tajima, having died on April 21, 2018, at 117 years of age.

==== G.I. Generation ====
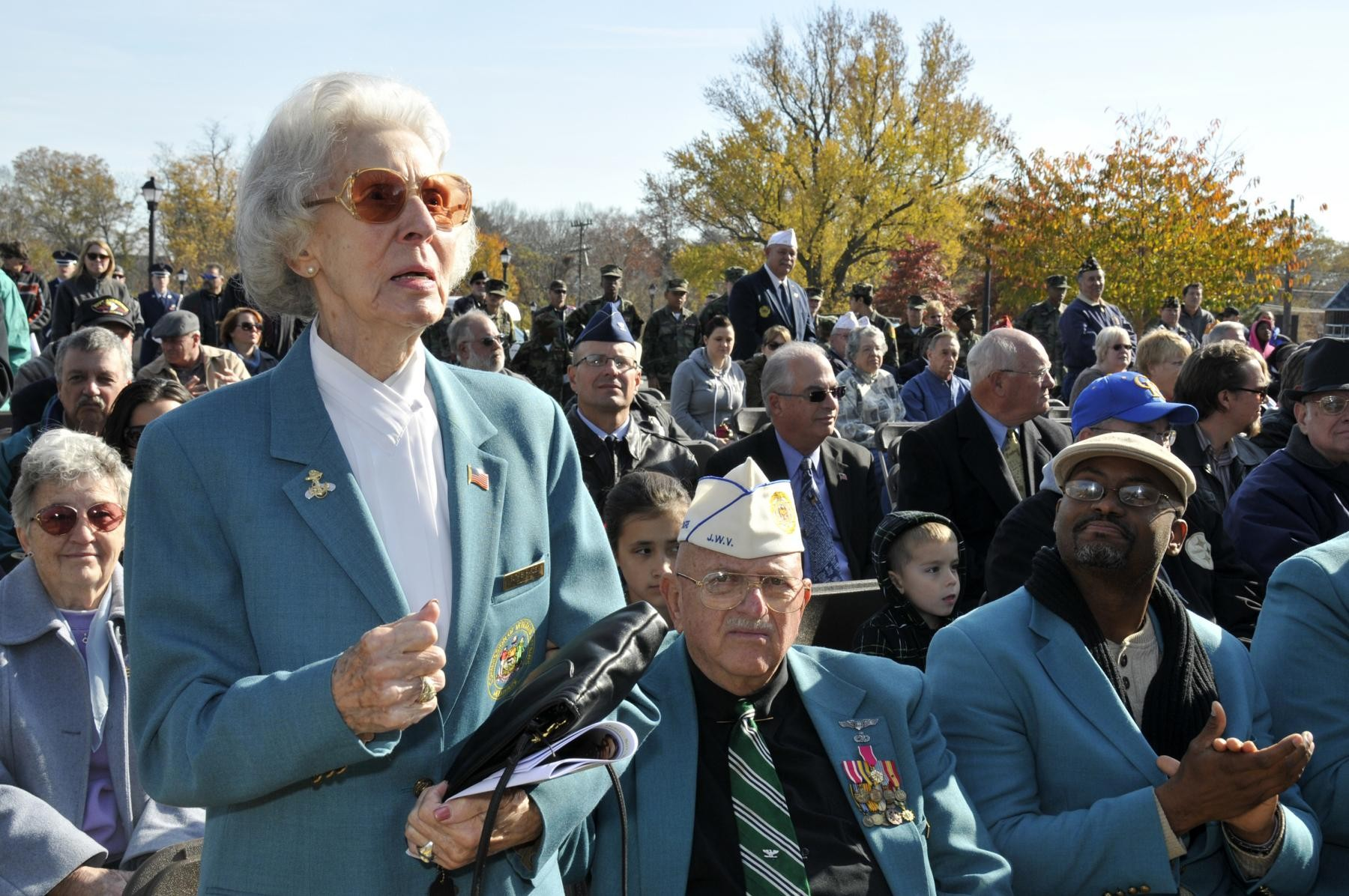
U.S. Navy veteran Ruth Harden sings as "Anchors Aweigh" is played during the dedication ceremony of the World War II memorial at Legislative Hall in Dover, Delaware, November 2013.

The Greatest Generation (hero archetype), also known as the G.I. Generation and the World War II generation, is the demographic cohort following the Lost Generation and preceding the Silent Generation. Strauss and Howe define the cohort as individuals born between 1901 and 1924. They were shaped by the Great Depression and were the primary participants in World War II.

==== Silent Generation ====
The Silent Generation (artist archetype) is the demographic cohort following the Greatest Generation and preceding the baby boomers. Strauss and Howe define the cohort as individuals born between 1925 and 1942.

=== Millennial Saeculum ===
==== Baby Boom Generation ====
Strauss and Howe define the baby boom generation (prophet archetype) as those born from 1943 to 1960.

==== 13th Generation/Generation X ====
Strauss and Howe define the 13th generation (nomad archetype) as those born from 1961 to 1981.

==== Millennial Generation ====
Neil Howe defines the millennial generation (hero archetype) as those born from 1982 to 2005.

==== Homeland Generation ====
Neil Howe defines the homeland generation (artist archetype) as those born from 2006 to 2029.

== Timing of generations and turnings ==
Strauss and Howe argue that the basic length of both generations and turnings—approximately 21 years—derives from longstanding socially and biologically determined phases of life. This is the reason it has remained relatively constant over centuries. Some have argued that rapid advances in technology in recent decades are shortening the length of a generation, but Strauss and Howe believe this is not the case. As long as the transition to adulthood occurs around age 21, the transition to midlife around age 43, and the transition to old age around age 65, they say the basic length of both generations and turnings will remain the same.

In their book, The Fourth Turning, Strauss and Howe say that the precise boundaries of generations and turnings are erratic. Strauss and Howe compare the saecular rhythm to the four seasons, which they say similarly occur in the same order, but with slightly varying timing. They claimed that the same is true for a Fourth Turning in any given saeculum.

| Generation | Archetype | Generation birth year span | Entered childhood in a | Turning year span |
Late Medieval Saeculum (1435–1487)
| Arthurian Generation | Hero (civic) | 1433–1460 (28) | 3rd Turning: Unraveling: Retreat from France | 1435–1459 (24) (Note: Strauss and Howe base the turning start and end dates not on the generational birth year span, but when the prior generation is entering adulthood. A generation "coming of age" is signaled by a "triggering event" that marks the turning point and the ending of one turning and the beginning of the new. For example, the "triggering event" that marked the coming of age for the baby boom generation was the assassination of John F. Kennedy. This marked the end of a first turning and the beginning of a second turning. This is why turning start and end dates don't match up exactly with the generational birth years, but they tend to start and end a few years after the generational year spans. This also explains why a generation is described to have "entered childhood" during a particular turning, rather than "born during" a particular turning.) |
| Humanist Generation | Artist (adaptive) | 1461–1482 (22) | 4th Turning: Crisis: War of the Roses | 1459–1487 (28) |
Reformation Saeculum (1487–1594)
| Reformation Generation | Prophet (Idealist) | 1483–1511 (29) | 1st Turning: High: Tudor Renaissance | 1487–1517 (30) |
| Reprisal Generation | Nomad (reactive) | 1512–1540 (29) | 2nd Turning: Awakening: Protestant Reformation | 1517–1542 (25) |
| Elizabethan Generation | Hero (civic) | 1541–1565 (25) | 3rd Turning: Unraveling: Counter-Reformation reaction and Marian Restoration | 1542–1569 (27) |
| Parliamentary Generation | Artist (adaptive) | 1566–1587 (22) | 4th Turning: Crisis: Armada crisis | 1569–1594 (25) |
New World Saeculum (1594–1704)
| Puritan Generation | Prophet (Idealist) | 1588–1617 (30) | 1st Turning: high: Merrie England | 1594–1621 (27) |
| Cavalier Generation | Nomad (reactive) | 1618–1647 (30) | 2nd Turning: Awakening: Puritan awakening, Antinomian Controversy | 1621–1649 (26) |
| Glorious Generation | Hero (civic) | 1648–1673 (26) | 3rd Turning: Unraveling: Restoration | 1649–1675 (26) |
| Enlightenment Generation | Artist (adaptive) | 1674–1700 (27) | 4th Turning: crisis: Glorious Revolution, King William's War, Queen Anne's War, Salem Witch Trials, Golden Age of Piracy | 1675–1704 (29) |
Revolutionary Saeculum (1704–1794)
| Awakening Generation | Prophet (Idealist) | 1701–1723 (23) | 1st Turning: High: Augustan Age of Empire | 1704–1727 (23) |
| Liberty Generation | Nomad (reactive) | 1724–1741 (18) | 2nd Turning: Awakening: Great awakening | 1727–1746 (19) |
| Republican Generation | Hero (civic) | 1742–1766 (25) | 3rd Turning: Unraveling: Seven Years' War (French and Indian War) | 1746–1773 (27) |
| Compromise Generation | Artist (adaptive) | 1767–1791 (23) | 4th Turning: Crisis: Age of Revolution | 1773–1794 (21) |
Civil War Saeculum (1794–1865)
| Transcendental Generation | Prophet (Idealist) | 1792–1821 (30) | 1st Turning: High: Era of Good Feelings | 1794–1822 (28) |
| Gilded Generation | Nomad (reactive) | 1822–1842 (21) | 2nd Turning: Awakening: Transcendental awakening, Abolitionist movement | 1822–1844 (22) |
| None (Note: According to Strauss and Howe their generational types have appeared in Anglo-American history in a fixed order for more than 500 years with one hitch, occurring in the Civil War saeculum. They say the reason for this is because the Civil War came about ten years too early; the adult generations allowed the worst aspects of their generational personalities to come through; and the Progressives grew up scarred rather than ennobled. As a result, there is no hero generation in this Cycle.) | Hero (civic) | | 3rd Turning: Unraveling: Mexican–American War, sectionalism, Antebellum South, California gold rush | 1844–1860 (16) |
| Progressive Generation | Artist (adaptive) | 1843–1859 (17) | 4th Turning: Crisis: Civil War | 1860–1865 (5) |
Great Power Saeculum (1865–1946)
| Missionary Generation | Prophet (Idealist) | 1860–1882 (23) | 1st Turning: High: Reconstruction, Gilded Age | 1865–1886 (21) |
| Lost Generation | Nomad (reactive) | 1883–1900 (18) | 2nd Turning: Awakening: Missionary awakening/Progressive era | 1886–1908 (22) |
| G.I. Generation | Hero (civic) | 1901–1924 (24) | 3rd Turning: Unraveling: World War I, Roaring Twenties, prohibition | 1908–1929 (21) |
| Silent Generation | Artist (adaptive) | 1925–1942 (18) | 4th Turning: Crisis: Great Depression, World War II | 1929–1946 (17) |
Millennial Saeculum (1946–2033?)
| Baby Boom Generation | Prophet (Idealist) | 1943–1960 (18) | 1st Turning: High: Post–World War II economic expansion, Korean War | 1946–1964 (18) |
| Generation X (Note: Strauss and Howe initially used the name "13th Generation" in their 1991 book Generations, which was published mere weeks before Douglas Coupland's Generation X: Tales for an Accelerated Culture, but later adopted "Generation X" when it became the more widely accepted term for the cohort. The generation is so numbered because it is the thirteenth generation alive since American independence (counting back until Benjamin Franklin's awakening generation).) | Nomad (reactive) | 1961–1981 (21) | 2nd Turning: Awakening: Consciousness revolution, Vietnam War, Fourth Great Awakening | 1964–1984 (20) |
| Millennial Generation (Note: "Millennials", a term Strauss and Howe first used in their 1991 book Generations, has become the most widely-accepted name for this generation. Another named used in reference to it is Generation Y (as it is the generation following Generation X).) | Hero (civic) | 1982–2005 (24) | 3rd Turning: Unraveling: Neoliberalism/culture wars, tech bubble, 9/11, war on terror | 1984–2008 (24) |
| Homeland Generation (Note: "New Silent Generation" was a proposed holding name used by Howe and Strauss in their 1991 book Generations. Howe has since referred to them as the "Homeland Generation" (or "New Adaptive Generation") as they are the first generation born entirely after protective surveillance state measures, like the Department of Homeland Security, were put into effect following the September 11 attacks. This generation is now more widely referred to as "Generation Z" or "Zoomers".) | Artist (adaptive) | 2006–2029 (24) | 4th Turning: Crisis: Great Recession, COVID-19 pandemic/recession, Russo-Ukrainian War, Middle Eastern Crisis | 2008–2033? (25) |

== Reception and impact ==
The Strauss and Howe interpretation of history through a generational lens has received mixed reviews and been described as a form of pseudoscience. Some reviewers have praised the authors for their ambition, erudition, and accessibility. For example, former U.S. Vice President Al Gore called Generations: The History of America's Future, 1584 to 2069 the most stimulating book on American history he'd ever read, and sent a copy to each member of Congress. The theory has been influential in the fields of generational studies, marketing, and business management literature. However, it has also been criticized by historians, political scientists, and journalists, as being overly deterministic, non-falsifiable, and unsupported by rigorous evidence.

In response to criticism that they stereotype or generalize all members of a generation, or do not take into account factors such as class, race, and sex, the authors have said, "We've never tried to say that any individual generation is going to be monochromatic. It'll obviously include all kinds of people. But as you look at generations as social units, we consider it to be at least as powerful and, in our view, far more powerful than other social groupings such as economic class, race, sex, religion, and political parties." Neil Howe said that most historians "prefer to tell history as a seamless row of 55-year-old leaders who always tend to think and behave the same way," but argued "they don't and they never have." Howe contrasted the confidence of G.I. Generation leaders such as John F. Kennedy and Lyndon B. Johnson with "the indecision" and "lack of sure-footedness" among Congress's Boomer leaders as an indicator that "you're dealing with powerful generational forces at work that explain why one generation of war veterans, war heroes, and another generation which came of age in very different circumstances tend to have very different instincts about acting in the world."

Responding to criticisms in 1991, William Strauss acknowledged that some historians might not like their theory, "because we are presenting something that is so new -- but the kinds who are drawn to it are the ones who themselves have focused on the human life cycle rather than just the sequential series of events. Some good examples of that are Morton Keller up at Brandeis and David Hackett Fischer. These are people who have noticed the power in not just generations, but the shifts that have happened over time in the way Americans have treated children and older people and have tried to link that to the broader currents of history."

In 2016 an article was published that explains the differences in generations, observed with the employer's position, through the development of working conditions, initiated by the employer. This development is due to the competition of firms on the job market for receiving more highly skilled workers. New working conditions as a product on the market have a classic product life-cycle and when they become widespread standard expectations of employees change accordingly.

One criticism of Strauss and Howe's theory and generational studies is that conclusions are overly broad and do not reflect the reality of every person in each generation regardless of their race, color, national origin, religion, sex, age, disability, or genetic information. For example, in 2009 Eric Hoover cited the case of Millennials, noting that "... commentators have tended to label white, affluent teenagers who accomplish great things as they grow up in the suburbs, who confront anxiety when applying to super-selective colleges, and who multitask with ease as their helicopter parents hover reassuringly above them as Millennials. The label tends not to appear in renderings of teenagers who happen to be minorities, poor, or who have never won a spelling bee. Nor does the term often refer to students from big cities and small towns that are nothing like Fairfax County, Virginia, or who lack technological know-how. Or who struggle to complete high school. Or who never even consider college. Or who commit crimes. Or who suffer from too little parental support. Or who drop out of college. Aren't they Millennials too?" In their 2000 book Millennials Rising Strauss and Howe attempt to address this criticism by mentioning that the Millennial children of immigrants in the United States, "who face daunting challenges." They wrote "one-third have no health insurance, live below the poverty line and live in overcrowded housing", but they do not engage with this criticism in any substantial way.

Steve Bannon, former Chief Strategist and Senior Counselor to president Donald Trump during his first term, is a prominent proponent of the theory. As a documentary filmmaker, Bannon discussed the details of Strauss–Howe generational theory in Generation Zero. According to historian David Kaiser, who was consulted for the film, Generation Zero "focused on the key aspect of their theory, the idea that every 80 years of American history has been marked by a crisis, or 'fourth turning', that destroyed an old order and created a new one". Kaiser said Bannon is "very familiar with Strauss and Howe's theory of crisis, and has been thinking about how to use it to achieve particular goals for quite a while." A February 2017 article from Business Insider titled: "Steve Bannon's obsession with a dark theory of history should be worrisome", commented: "Bannon seems to be trying to bring about the 'Fourth Turning'."

In 2006, Frank Giancola wrote an article in Human Resource Planning that stated "the emphasis on generational differences is not generally borne out by empirical research, despite its popularity". In a February 2017 article from Quartz two journalists commented on the theory saying: "it is too vague to be proven wrong, and has not been taken seriously by most professional historians. But it is superficially compelling, and plots out to some degree how America's history has unfolded since its founding". A May 2017 article from Quartz described the Strauss–Howe generational theory as "pseudoscience".

In an April 2017 article from Politico, David Greenberg, a professor of history and media studies at Rutgers University, described Strauss–Howe generational theory as "crackpot theories". Peter Turchin, a scientist and specialist in the fields of cultural evolution, cliodynamics and structural-demographic theory, has criticized the theory, stating that it is not a scientific theory and that it is more akin to a prophecy since it "forces the historical record to fit a postulated cycle by stretching in some places and cutting off a bit here and there in others".

== In popular culture ==
American electronic musician Oneohtrix Point Never was inspired by The Fourth Turning for the concept of his 2018 album Age Of and its accompanying performance installation MYRIAD.

Will Arbery's play Heroes of the Fourth Turning, first produced at New York's Playwrights Horizons in 2019, is inspired by the theories of Strauss and Howe, and the character Teresa is a vocal proponent of them.

The 2022 Netflix series The Watcher features a scene citing postulations from The Fourth Turning.

== See also ==
- Anacyclosis
- Cyclical theory
- Dependency ratio
- Dialectic
- Historic recurrence
- Kondratiev wave
- Malthusian crisis
- Population cycle
- Social cycle theory
- Social generation
- List of social generations
- Tytler cycle
- War economy
- Yuga

== Bibliography ==
- Strauss, William; Howe, Neil (1991). Generations: The History of America's Future, 1584 to 2069 (1 ed.). New York: William Morrow and Company Inc. ISBN 978-0-688-08133-1. OCLC 22306142.
- Howe, Neil; Strauss, William (1993). 13th Gen: Abort, Retry, Ignore, Fail? (1 ed.). New York: Vintage Books. ISBN 978-0-679-74365-1. OCLC 26632626.
- Strauss, William; Howe, Neil (1997). The Fourth Turning: An American Prophecy (1 ed.). New York: Broadway Books. ISBN 978-0-553-06682-1. OCLC 35008291.
- Howe, Neil; Strauss, William (2000). Millennials Rising: The Next Great Generation. William Strauss. New York: Vintage Books. ISBN 978-0-375-70719-3. OCLC 44118080.
- Howe, Neil; Strauss, William (2007). Millennials Go to College: Strategies for a New Generation on Campus: Recruiting and Admissions, Campus Life, and the Classroom (2 ed.). Great Falls, Va.: LifeCourse Associates. ISBN 978-0-9712606-1-0. OCLC 123907203.
- Howe, Neil; Strauss, William; Nadler, Reena (2008). Millennials & K-12 Schools: Educational Strategies for a New Generation. Great Falls, Va.: LifeCourse Associates. ISBN 978-0-9712606-5-8. OCLC 311800406.
