= Supercentenarian =

Person who turned 110 years old

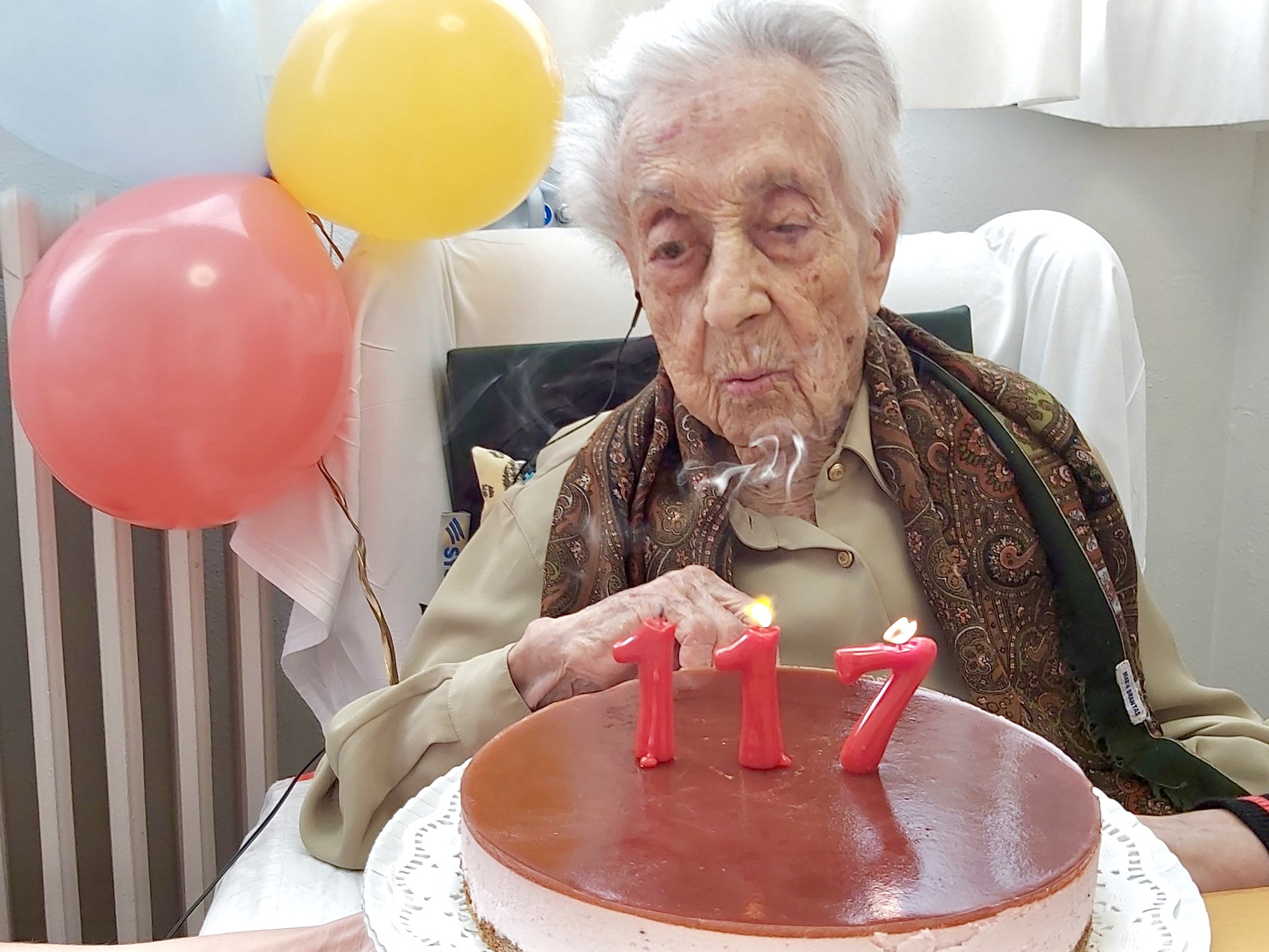
Supercentenarian Maria Branyas Morera (1907–2024) celebrating her 117th birthday

A supercentenarian, sometimes hyphenated as super-centenarian, is a person who has reached the age of 110 or older. This age is achieved by approximately one in 1,000 centenarians. Supercentenarians typically live a life free of significant age-related diseases until shortly before the maximum human lifespan is reached.

== Etymology ==
The term supercentenarian has been used since 1832 or earlier. Norris McWhirter, editor of The Guinness Book of Records, used the term in association with age claims researcher A. Ross Eckler Jr. in 1976, and the term was further popularised in 1991 by William Strauss and Neil Howe in their book Generations.

The term semi-supercentenarian has been used to describe someone aged 105–109. Originally, the term supercentenarian was used to mean someone well over the age of 100, but 110 years and over became the cutoff point of accepted criteria for demographers.

== Incidence ==
Researchers estimate, based on a 0.15% to 0.25% survival rate of centenarians until the age of 110, that there should be between 300 and 450 living supercentenarians in the world. A study conducted in 2010 by the Max Planck Institute for Demographic Research found 663 validated supercentenarians, living and dead, and showed that the countries with the highest total number (not frequency) of supercentenarians (in decreasing order) were the United States, Japan, England plus Wales, France, and Italy. The first verified supercentenarian in human history was Dutchman Geert Adriaans Boomgaard (1788–1899), and it was not until the 1980s that the oldest verified age surpassed 115.

It has been suggested that data of supercentenarians, even if "verified", tend to be unreliable. A study argues that document validation, the only method that demographers use to verify old age, is susceptible to errors that have often been ignored due to confirmation bias and other factors, causing inflated number of valid cases. This suggests that many figures of supercentenarian population, and studies that rely on those populations especially in the so-called Blue zones, may contain substantial errors that have yet to reassessed critically. In one blue zone example, 82% of the supercentenarian population were discovered to be missing, imaginary, clerical errors, or dead upon verification. In another example, 72% of the centenarian population were misreported as still living so that family members could collect pension benefits. The study was awarded with the Ig Nobel Prize in 2024.

== History ==
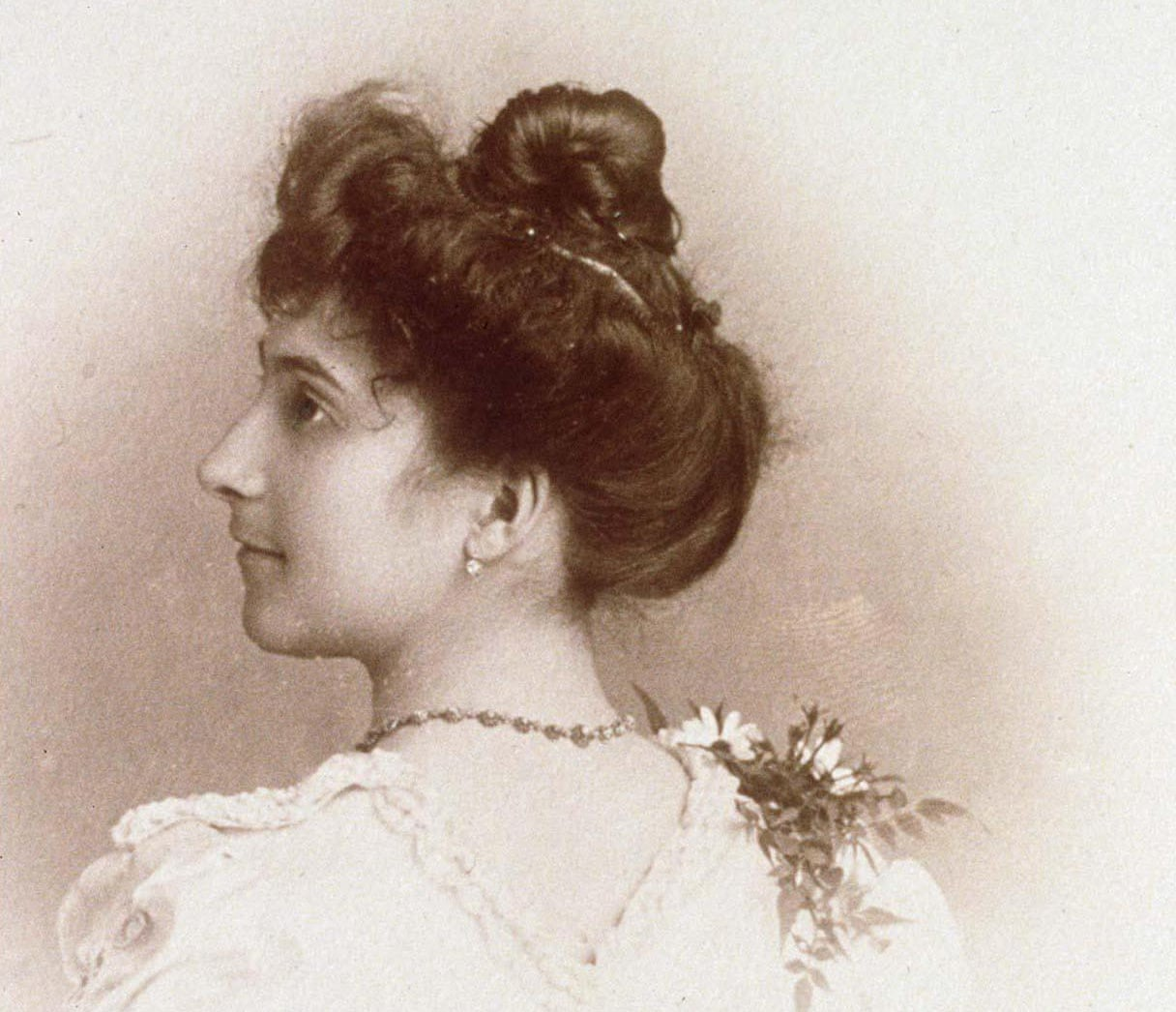
Jeanne Calment, the oldest verified supercentenarian and only verified person to reach the age of 122

While claims of extreme age have persisted from the earliest times in history, the earliest supercentenarian accepted by Guinness World Records is Thomas Peters of the Netherlands (c. 1745–1857). However, Peters's age cannot be reliably verified due to an absence of any documents recording his early life. Other scholars, such as French demographer Jean-Marie Robine, consider Geert Adriaans Boomgaard, also of the Netherlands, who turned 110 in 1898, to be the first verifiable case, as the alleged evidence for Peters has apparently been lost. The evidence for the 112 years of Englishman William Hiseland (c. 1620–1732) does not meet the standards required by Guinness World Records.

In 1902, Margaret Ann Neve, born in 1792, became the first verified female supercentenarian.

Jeanne Calment of France, who died in 1997 aged 122 years, 164 days, had the longest human lifespan documented. The oldest man ever verified is Jiroemon Kimura of Japan, who died in 2013 aged 116 years and 54 days.

The world's oldest living person and oldest living woman is Ethel Caterham, of England, born 21 August 1909, aged 117 years, 79 days. The current oldest living man is João Marinho Neto, of Brazil, born 5 October 1912, aged 114 years, 34 days.

== Research into centenarians ==
Research into centenarians helps scientists understand how an ordinary person might live longer.

Organisations that research centenarians and supercentenarians include the GRG, LongeviQuest, and the Supercentenarian Research Foundation.

In May 2021, whole genome sequencing analysis of 81 Italian semi-supercentenarians and supercentenarians were published, along with 36 control group people from the same region who were simply of advanced age.

== Morbidity ==
Research on the morbidity of supercentenarians has found that they remain free of major age-related diseases (e.g., stroke, cardiovascular disease, dementia, cancer, Parkinson's disease and diabetes) until the very end of life, when they die of exhaustion of organ reserve, which is the ability to return organ function to homeostasis. About 10% of supercentenarians survive until the last three months of life without major age-related diseases, as compared to only 4% of semi-supercentenarians and 3% of centenarians.

By measuring the biological age of various tissues from supercentenarians, researchers may be able to identify the nature of those that are protected from aging effects. According to a study of 30 different body parts from a 112-year-old female supercentenarian, along with younger controls, the cerebellum is protected from ageing, according to an epigenetic biomarker of tissue age known as the epigenetic clock—the reading is about 15 years younger than expected in a centenarian. These findings could explain why the cerebellum exhibits fewer neuropathological hallmarks of age-related dementia as compared to other brain regions.

A 2021 genomic study identified genetic characteristics that protect against age-related diseases, particularly variants that improve DNA repair. Five variants were found to be significant, affecting STK17A (increased expression) and COA1 (reduced expression) genes. Supercentenarians also had an unexpectedly low level of somatic mutations.

== See also ==
- Active ageing
- List of supercentenarians
- Superager
- Longevity escape velocity
