= 13th Gen (book) =

1993 book by Neil Howe and William Strauss

13th Gen: Abort, Retry, Ignore, Fail?
- Author: Neil Howe and William Strauss
- Subject: Strauss–Howe generational theory
- Publisher: Vintage Books
- Publication date: March 23, 1993

13th Gen: Abort, Retry, Ignore, Fail? is a 1993 book by Neil Howe and William Strauss. It is based on the Strauss–Howe generational theory, and examines Generation X (described as the "Nomad" generation in the theory), who were teenagers and young adults at the time.

== Reception ==
In 1993, Andrew Leonard reviewed the book for The New York Times. He wrote "as the authors (Strauss and Howe) relentlessly attack the iniquitous 'child-abusive culture' of the 1960s and '70s and exult in heaping insult after insult on their own generation -- they caricature Baby Boomers as countercultural, long-haired, sex-obsessed hedonists -- their real agenda begins to surface. That agenda becomes clear in part of their wish list for how the 13th generation may influence the future: "13ers will reverse the frenzied and centrifugal cultural directions of their younger years. They will clean up entertainment, de-diversify the culture, reinvent core symbols of national unity, reaffirm rituals of family and neighborhood bonding, and re-erect barriers to cushion communities from unwanted upheaval."

Again in 1993, writing for The Globe and Mail, Jim Cormier reviewed the same book: "self-described boomers Howe and Strauss add no profound layer of analysis to previous pop press observations. But in cobbling together a more extensive overview of the problems and concerns of the group they call the 13ers, they've created a valuable primer for other fogeys who are feeling seriously out of touch." Cormier wrote that the authors "raised as many new questions as answers about the generation that doesn't want to be a generation. But at least they've made an honest, empathetic, and good-humoured effort to bridge the bitter gap between the twentysomethings and fortysomethings."

In 1993, Charles Laurence at the London Daily Telegraph wrote that, in 13th Gen, Strauss and Howe offered this youth generation "a relatively neutral definition as the 13th American generation from the Founding Fathers,". According to Alexander Ferron's review in Eye Magazine, "13th Gen is best read as the work of two top-level historians. While its agenda is the 13th generation, it can also be seen as an incredibly well-written and exhaustive history of America from 1960 to 1981--examining the era through everything except the traditional historical subjects (war, politics, famine, etc)."

== See also ==
- Generation X: Tales for an Accelerated Culture
