= Millennials Rising =

2000 book by Neil Howe and William Strauss

Millennials Rising: The Next Great Generation
- Author: Neil Howe and William Strauss
- Subject: Strauss–Howe generational theory
- Publisher: Vintage Books
- Publication date: September 5, 2000

Millennials Rising: The Next Great Generation is a 2000 book by Neil Howe and William Strauss. It is based on the Strauss–Howe generational theory, and examines Millennials (described as the "Hero" generation in the theory), who were children and teenagers at the time.

== Reception ==
David Brooks reviewed the book for The New York Times, in an article titled "What's the Matter With Kids Today? Not a Thing". Brooks wrote: "This is not a good book, if by good you mean the kind of book in which the authors have rigorously sifted the evidence and carefully supported their assertions with data. But it is a very good bad book. It's stuffed with interesting nuggets. It's brightly written. And if you get away from the generational mumbo jumbo, it illuminates changes that really do seem to be taking place." He described the message of Millennials Rising as "we boomers are raising a cohort of kids who are smarter, more industrious and better behaved than any generation before", saying the book complimented the Baby Boomer cohort by way of their parenting skills. Brooks also said the generations aren't treated equally, however: "Basically, it sounds as if America has two greatest generations at either end of the age scale and two crummiest in the middle."

In 2001, reviewer Dina Gomez wrote in NEA Today that the authors make their case "convincingly," with "intriguing analysis of popular culture" but conceded that it "over-generalizes". Gomez argued that it is "hard to resist its hopeful vision for our children and future." Millennials Rising ascribes seven "core traits" to Millennials: special, sheltered, confident, team-oriented, conventional, pressured, and achieving. A 2009 Chronicle of Higher Education report commented Howe and Strauss based these core traits on a "hodgepodge of anecdotes, statistics, and pop-culture references" and on surveys of approximately 600 high-school seniors from Fairfax County, Virginia, an affluent county with median household income approximately twice the national average. The report described Millennials Rising as a "good-news revolution" making "sweeping predictions" and describing Millennials as "rule followers who were engaged, optimistic, and downright pleasant", commenting the "book gave educators and tens of millions of parents, a warm feeling, saying who wouldn't want to hear that their kids are special?"
