= Generations (book) =

1991 book

Generations: The History of America's Future, 1584–2069
- Title page for Generations: The History of America's Future, 1584–2069 (1991)
- Author: Neil Howe and William Strauss
- Subject: Strauss–Howe generational theory
- Genre: Non-fiction
- Publisher: William Morrow and Company
- Publication date: 1991

Generations: The History of America's Future, 1584–2069 is a 1991 non-fiction book by William Strauss and Neil Howe. It described the Strauss–Howe generational theory, which posits that American history takes place along generational cycles of crisis and resurgence.

== Reception ==
Jay P. Dolan in The New York Times wrote that "As history, 'Generations' does not make the grade. It pretends to offer a new interpretation of the past, but it is too contrived to be taken seriously. And as a guide to the future, it is about as reliable as the neighborhood fortuneteller." Publishers Weekly called it "a trendy, detailed, convoluted chronicle, often as woolly as newspaper horoscope." George N. Heller in The Bulletin of Historical Research in Music Education described its premise as "an approach to history which has considerable promise."

After the publication of their first book Generations, Morton Keller, a professor of history at Brandeis University, said that the authors "had done their homework". He said that their theory could be seen as pop sociology and that it would "come in for a lot more criticism as history. But it's almost always true that the broader you cast your net, the more holes it's going to have. And I admire [the authors'] boldness."

Sociologist David Riesman and political scientist Richard Neustadt offered strong, if qualified, praise. Riesman found in the work an "impressive grasp of a great many theoretical and historical bits and pieces" and Neustadt said Strauss and Howe "are asking damned important questions, and I honor them." The Times Literary Supplement called it "fascinating", but also "about as vague and plausible as astrological predictions". Publishers Weekly called it "as woolly as a newspaper horoscope".

In 1991, Jonathan Alter wrote in Newsweek that Generations was a "provocative, erudite and engaging analysis of the rhythms of American life". However, he believed it was also "an elaborate historical horoscope that will never withstand scholarly scrutiny." He continued, "these sequential 'peer personalities' are often silly, but the book provides reams of fresh evidence that American history is indeed cyclical, as Arthur Schlesinger Jr. and others have long argued." But he complained, "The generational boundaries are plainly arbitrary. The authors lump together everyone born from 1943 through the end of 1960 (Baby Boomers), a group whose two extremes have little in common. And the predictions are facile and reckless." He concluded: "However fun and informative, the truth about generational generalizations is that they're generally unsatisfactory."

Arthur E. Levine, a former president of the Teachers College of Columbia University said "Generational images are stereotypes. There are some differences that stand out, but there are more similarities between students of the past and the present. But if you wrote a book saying that, how interesting would it be?"

Gerald Pershall wrote in 1991: "Generations is guaranteed to attract pop history and pop social science buffs. Among professional historians, it faces a tougher sell. Period specialists will resist the idea that their period is akin to several others. Sweeping theories of history are long out of fashion in the halls of ivy, and the authors' lack of academic standing won't help their cause. Their generational quartet is "just too wooden" and "too neat," says one Yale historian. "Prediction is for prophets," scoffed William McLoughlin, a former history professor at Brown, who said it is wrong to think that "if you put enough data together and have enough charts and graphs, you've made history into a science." He also said the book might get a friendlier reception in the sociology and political science departments than in the science department.
