= William Strauss =

American author (1947–2007)

- Born: December 5, 1947; Chicago, Illinois, U.S.
- Died: December 18, 2007 (aged 60); McLean, Virginia, U.S.
- Education: Harvard University
- Occupations: author; playwright; theatre director; lecturer
- Known for: Strauss–Howe generational theory, Capitol Steps, Cappies

William Strauss (December 5, 1947 – December 18, 2007) was an American author, lawyer, playwright, theater director, and lecturer. As an author, he is known for his work with Neil Howe on social generations. They created the Strauss–Howe generational theory and coined the term Millennials. He is also known as the co-founder and director of the satirical musical theater group the Capitol Steps, and as the co-founder of the Cappies, a critics and awards program for high school theater students.

== Early life and education ==
Strauss was born in Chicago and grew up in Burlingame, California. He graduated from Harvard University in 1969. In 1973, he received a JD from Harvard Law School and a master's in public policy from Harvard Kennedy School, where he was a member of the program's first graduating class.

== Career ==
After receiving his degrees, Strauss worked in Washington, D.C., as a policy aid to the Presidential Clemency Board, directing a research team writing a report on the impact of the Vietnam War on the generation that was drafted.

In 1978, Strauss and Lawrence Baskir co-authored two books on the Vietnam War, Chance and Circumstance, and Reconciliation after Vietnam. Strauss later worked at the U.S. Department of Energy and as a committee staffer for U.S. Senator Charles Percy, and in 1980 he became chief counsel and staff director of the Subcommittee on Energy, Nuclear Proliferation, and Government Processes.

=== Capitol Steps ===
In 1981, Strauss organized a group of senate staffers to perform satirical songs at the annual office Christmas party of his employer, Senator Percy. The group was so successful that Strauss went on to co-found a professional satirical troupe, the Capitol Steps, with Elaina Newport. The Capitol Steps was a $3 million company with more than 40 employees who performed at venues across the country until shutting down in 2021. As director, Strauss wrote many of the songs, performed regularly off Broadway, and recorded 29 albums with the Capitol Steps.

External videos
- Booknotes interview with Strauss and Howe on Generations, April 14, 1991, C-SPAN
- Discussion with Strauss and Howe on The Fourth Turning, April 17, 1998, C-SPAN

During the 1990s, Strauss developed another career as an historian and pop sociologist, examining how generational differences shape attitudes, behaviors, and the course of history. He wrote seven books on social generations with Neil Howe, beginning with Generations in 1991. In 1997, Strauss and Howe founded LifeCourse Associates, a publishing, speaking, and consulting company built on their generational theory. As a partner at LifeCourse, Strauss worked as a corporate, nonprofit, education, and government affairs consultant.

In 1999, Strauss received a diagnosis of pancreatic cancer, which led him to found the Cappies, a program to inspire the next generation of theater performers and writers. Now an international program including hundreds of high schools, Cappies allows students to attend and review each other's plays and musicals, publish reviews in major newspapers, and hold Tonys-style Cappies award Galas, in which Strauss acted as MC for the Fairfax County, Virginia program. Strauss also founded Cappies International Theater, a summer program in which top Cappies winners perform plays and musicals written by teenagers. In 2006 and 2007, Strauss advised creative teams of students who wrote two new musicals, Edit:Undo and Senioritis. Senioritis was made into a movie that was released in 2007.

=== Author ===
Strauss authored multiple books on social generations, as well as a number of plays and musicals.

In 1978, he and Lawrence Baskir co-authored Chance and Circumstance, a book about the Vietnam-era draft. Their second book, Reconciliation After Vietnam (1978) "was said to have influenced" President Jimmy Carter's blanket pardon of Vietnam draft resisters.

Strauss's books with Neil Howe include Generations (1991) and The Fourth Turning (1997), which examine historical generations and describe a theorized cycle of recurring mood eras in American history, now described as the Strauss–Howe generational theory. Generations made a deep impression on former U.S. vice president Al Gore, who called it the most stimulating book on American history he'd ever read. He even sent a copy to each member of Congress. The Fourth Turning made a deep impression on Steve Bannon, who wrote and directed Generation Zero (2010), a Citizens United Productions film on the book's theory, prior to his becoming White House Chief Strategist.

Strauss and Howe also co-authored 13th Gen (1993) about Generation X, and Millennials Rising (2000) about the Millennials.

Eric Hoover has called the authors pioneers in a burgeoning industry of consultants, speakers and researchers focused on generations. He wrote a critical piece about the concept of "generations" and the "Millennials", a term coined by Strauss and Howe, for the Chronicle of Higher Education. Michael Lind offered his critique of Howe's book Generations for The New York Times.

Strauss also wrote a number of application books with Howe about the Millennials' impact on various sectors, including Millennials Go to College (2003, 2007), Millennials in the Pop Culture (2005), and Millennials in K-12 Schools (2008).

Strauss wrote three musicals, MaKiddo, Free-the-Music.com, and Anasazi, and two plays, Gray Champions and The Big Bump, about various themes in the books he has co-authored with Howe. He also co-wrote two books of political satire with Elaina Newport, Fools on the Hill (1992) and Sixteen Scandals (2002).

== Death ==
On December 18, 2007, Strauss died of pancreatic cancer in his home in McLean, Virginia, at age 60.

His wife of 34 years, Janie Strauss, lives in McLean and was a member of the Fairfax County School Board for 26 years. They have four children.

== Selected bibliography ==
=== Books ===
- Chance and Circumstance (1978)
- Reconciliation After Vietnam (1978)
- Generations: The History of America's Future, 1584 to 2069 (1991)
- Fools on the Hill (1992)
- 13th Gen: Abort, Retry, Ignore, Fail? (1993)
- The Fourth Turning (1997)
- Millennials Rising: The Next Great Generation (2000)
- Sixteen Scandals (2002)
- Millennials Go to College (2003, 2007)
- Millennials and the Pop Culture (2006)
- Millennials and K-12 Schools (2008)

=== Plays and musicals ===
- MaKiddo (2000)
- Free-the-Music.com (2001)
- The Big Bump (2001)
- Anasazi (2004)
- Gray Champions (2005)
