= Neil Howe =

American author and consultant (born 1951)

- Born: October 21, 1951 (age 74); Santa Monica, California, United States
- Education: UC Berkeley, Yale University
- Occupation: Writer
- Known for: Generational theory in collaboration with William Strauss
- Family: Robert Julius Trumpler (grandfather)

Neil Howe (born October 21, 1951) is an American author and consultant. He is best known for his work with William Strauss on social generations regarding a theorized generational cycle in American history, wherein they notably coined the term Millennials.

Howe is currently the managing director of demography at Hedgeye and he is president of Saeculum Research and LifeCourse Associates, consulting companies he founded with Strauss to apply their generational theory. He is also a senior associate at the Center for Strategic and International Studies' Global Aging Initiative, and a senior advisor to the Concord Coalition.

== Biography ==
Howe was born in Santa Monica, California. His grandfather was the astronomer Robert Julius Trumpler. His father was a physicist and his mother was a professor of occupational therapy. He attended high school in Palo Alto, California, and earned a BA in English Literature at UC Berkeley in 1972. He studied abroad in France and Germany, and later earned graduate degrees in economics (MA, 1978) and history (MPhil, 1979) from Yale University.

After receiving his degrees, Howe worked in Washington, D.C., as a public policy consultant on global aging, long-term fiscal policy, and migration. His positions have included advisor on public policy to the Blackstone Group, policy advisor to the Concord Coalition, and senior associate for the Global Aging Initiative at the Center for Strategic and International Studies (CSIS).

During the 1990s, Howe developed a second career as an author, historian and pop sociologist, examining how generational differences shape attitudes, behaviors, and the course of history. He has since written nine books on social generations, mostly with William Strauss. In 1997 Strauss and Howe founded LifeCourse Associates, a publishing, speaking, and consulting company built on their generational theory. As president of LifeCourse, Howe currently provides marketing, personnel, and government affairs consulting to corporate and nonprofit clients, and writes and speaks about the collective personalities of today's generations.

Howe lives in Great Falls, Virginia, and has two children, Giorgia (born 1992) and Nathaniel (born 1994).

== Work ==
External videos
- Booknotes interview with Howe and Strauss on Generations, April 14, 1991, C-SPAN
- Discussion with Howe and Strauss on The Fourth Turning, April 17, 1998, C-SPAN

Howe has written a number of non-academic books on generational trends. He is best known for his books with William Strauss on generations in American history. These include Generations (1991) and The Fourth Turning (1997) which examine historical generations and describe a theorized cycle of recurring mood eras in American history, now described as the Strauss–Howe generational theory.

Generations made a deep impression on former US Vice President Al Gore, who called it the most stimulating book on American history he'd ever read, and sent a copy to each member of Congress. The Fourth Turning made a deep impression on Steve Bannon, who wrote and directed Generation Zero (2010), a Citizens United Productions film on the book's theory, prior to his becoming White House Chief Strategist.

Howe and Strauss co-authored 13th Gen: Abort, Retry, Ignore, Fail? (1993) about Generation X, and Millennials Rising (2000) about the Millennial Generation. Eric Hoover has called the authors pioneers in a burgeoning industry of consultants, speakers and researchers focused on generations. He wrote a critical piece about the concept of "generations" and the "Millennials", a term coined by Strauss and Howe, for the Chronicle of Higher Education. Michael Lind offered his critique of Howe's book Generations for The New York Times Book Review.

Howe has written a number of books with Strauss about the Millennials’ impact on various sectors, including Millennials Go to College (2003, 2007), Millennials and the Pop Culture (2006), and Millennials and K-12 Schools (2008). After Strauss died in 2007, Howe authored Millennials in the Workplace (2010).

In 1988, he coauthored On Borrowed Time with Peter G. Peterson, one of the early calls for budgetary reform (the book was reissued 2004). Since the late 1990s, Howe has also coauthored a number of academic studies published by CSIS, including the Global Aging Initiative’s "Aging Vulnerability Index" and The Graying of the Middle Kingdom: The Economics and Demographics of Retirement Policy in China. In 2008, he co-authored The Graying of the Great Powers with Richard Jackson.

== Selected bibliography ==
- On Borrowed Time (1988)
- Generations: The History of America's Future, 1584 to 2069 (1991)
- 13th Gen: Abort, Retry, Ignore, Fail? (1993)
- The Fourth Turning (1997)
- Global Aging: The Challenge of the Next Millennium (1999)
- Millennials Rising: The Next Great Generation (2000)
- The 2003 Aging Vulnerability Index (2003)
- Millennials Go to College (2003, 2007)
- The Graying of the Middle Kingdom (2004)
- Millennials and the Pop Culture (2006)
- Long-Term Immigration Projection Methods (2006)
- Millennials and K-12 Schools (2008)
- The Graying of the Great Powers (2008)
- Millennials in the Workplace (2010)
- The Fourth Turning Is Here: What the Seasons of History Tell Us about How and When This Crisis Will End (2023)
