= Fire from the Heartland =

- DVD cover art
- Directed by: Stephen K. Bannon
- Written by: Stephen K. Bannon
- Produced by: David N. Bossie; Stephen K. Bannon
- Starring: Michele Bachmann; Deneen Borelli; Ann Coulter; S. E. Cupp; Dana Loesch; Cynthia Lummis
- Cinematography: Matthew A. Taylor
- Edited by: Matthew A. Taylor
- Music by: David Cebert
- Production companies: Citizens United Productions; Victory Media
- Release date: September 22, 2010
- Running time: 84 minutes
- Country: United States
- Language: English
- Budget: $600,000

Fire from the Heartland: The Awakening of the Conservative Woman is a 2010 American documentary film written and directed by former Breitbart News LLC executive chairman Steve Bannon, and produced by David N. Bossie for Citizens United Productions. The documentary stars Michele Bachmann, Deneen Borelli, and Ann Coulter, and focuses on female participation in conservative politics.

== Background ==
Bannon was inspired to create the documentary after seeing former Alaskan governor Sarah Palin run as John McCain's vice president running mate in the 2008 United States presidential election. In exploring the Tea Party movement, the film interviews only women. The sole male voice heard in the film is from a clip of an on-air rant by CNBC's Rick Santelli from a February 2009 broadcast.

== Synopsis ==
The documentary looks at the idea of the conservative political female in the United States and how they have impacted and been impacted by the Tea Party movement. Bannon interviews women from different socioeconomic backgrounds and how this has had an effect on their outlook on life and in politics; the women also discuss what they believe what the future will bring and their opinions on how conservative politics and the Tea Party is portrayed in the media.

== Cast ==
- Michele Bachmann
- Deneen Borelli
- Ann Coulter
- S. E. Cupp
- Dana Loesch
- Cynthia Lummis
- Jenny Beth Martin
- Michelle Malkin
- Jamie Radtke
- Phyllis Schlafly
- Jean Schmidt
- Janine Turner

== Reception ==
Tina Nguyen, writing in Vanity Fair, referred to the film as propaganda by Bannon.
