= The Undefeated (2011 film) =

2011 American political documentary

- Directed by: Stephen K. Bannon
- Written by: Stephen K. Bannon
- Produced by: Glenn Bracken Evans; Dan Fleuette
- Distributed by: Arc Entertainment
- Release date: July 15, 2011
- Running time: 113 minutes
- Country: United States
- Language: English
- Budget: $1,000,000
- Box office: $116,381

The Undefeated is an American political documentary written and directed by Stephen K. Bannon. It focuses on Sarah Palin, who was Governor of Alaska and later the Republican Party nominee for vice president in the 2008 United States presidential election. The Undefeated was released on July 15, 2011.

== Synopsis ==
The film is constructed in three acts. The film opens with a montage and the first act explores Palin's term as mayor of Wasilla. The second act is about Palin's half term as governor of Alaska. The third act, titled "From here, I can see November," revolves around her candidacy for vice-president and her rise to national prominence. It goes into detail how she became the darling of the Tea Party movement. The film ends with clips of the Madison rally where Palin challenged Republicans to: "Fight like a girl." The last shot is of Palin saying into the camera, "Mr. President, game on!"

== Production ==
Stephen K. Bannon wrote and directed The Undefeated, which was independently financed by Victory Film Group. Sarah Palin was familiar with Bannon because of his Tea Party documentary Generation Zero. After the United States elections in November 2010, when the Republican Party increased their seats in Congress, Palin asked her aide, Rebecca Mansour, to contact Bannon about creating a series of videos to explain Palin's stepping down as Governor of Alaska and to "protect her legacy" to set up for a potential campaign for the 2012 United States presidential election. Bannon instead decided to produce a feature film about Sarah Palin and provided $1 million of his own financing. For the documentary, he interviewed Palin's supporters, including Alaskan residents and conservative bloggers like Andrew Breitbart. While Sarah Palin and her team were not part of the production, they gave Bannon's documentary their blessing. Bannon bought audio rights to Palin's book Going Rogue so he could include clips of Palin's voice in the documentary. While he considered titling the documentary Take a Stand after Palin's campaign slogan during the 2006 Alaska gubernatorial election, he chose The Undefeated as a "more triumphant" title.

== Release ==
Arc Entertainment released The Undefeated on July 15, 2011 in AMC theaters in Dallas, Denver, Oklahoma City, Orlando, Atlanta, Orange County, Phoenix, Houston, Indianapolis, and Kansas City. Before the commercial release, the documentary had one-night screenings at select theaters in the states of Iowa, New Hampshire, and South Carolina. On June 17, the movie premiered to attendees of the RightOnline convention in Minneapolis.

There are two versions of the documentary: one version rated PG-13 by the MPAA, and an unedited version featuring anti-Palin clips from Rosie O'Donnell, Matt Damon, Bill Maher, David Letterman, Howard Stern and Louis C.K.

== Reception ==
Politico reported that professional film critics greeted it with "a chorus of boos", describing the film as 'biased', 'hagiographic', and "propaganda". The film holds a 0% approval rating on the review aggregation website Rotten Tomatoes based on reviews from 15 critics. On Metacritic it has a score of 32 out of 100 based on 8 reviews. John Wilson, creator of the Golden Raspberry Award, said in a pre-screening comment, "Sarah Palin is what the Razzies are all about." New York Post critic Kyle Smith described the film as "massively flawed", and said, "I don't know why Sarah Palin called her movie 'The Undefeated'. She lost the vice presidency, she quit the governorship of Alaska and she cut her bus tour short. The title makes no sense." Time critic Richard Corliss, who panned the film, stated "Bannon applies so much idolatrous airbrushing to his portrait of the divine Sarah that the movie might be called Going Rouge. But he is canny in identifying the 2½-year governor of Alaska as both a faultless heroine and, even better, a victim of the omnipotent American left... in Bannon's version of things, Palin fights the good fight, beats the fat cats and trumpets the pioneer independence of Alaskans from the predatory federal government — a government that, by the way, returns $1.84 in aid to the state for every dollar it sends to Washington..."

The film was given a limited theatrical release in ten AMC theaters located in areas with strong Tea Party support, and was received positively there, Victory Film Group reported that the film averaged $5,000 per screen in the first two days of release. The Undefeated grossed $60,000-75,000, averaging $6,000 to $7,500 per screen. In larger markets, the film surpassed $10,000 per screen, and at least one theater in Phoenix played the film on two screens to meet demand. However, by the second week of release box office revenue declined by 63% despite a 40% increase in theaters showing the film, with a total gross of only $24,000. Palin announced she would not run for president on October 5, 2011, shortly before the film's DVD release.

Conservative political commentators generally praised the film. Tony Lee wrote in Human Events that Undefeated will "reaffirm what Palin supporters like about her while presenting a solid case to those who may be on the fence about Palin that she cannot only be a strong executive but that she can and has had a history of winning over independents." He found the pivotal moment in the movie was when Mark Levin compared Palin to Ronald Reagan noting that Palin and Reagan share the same type of detractors.

Wes Little of CNN described imagery in the film as including "Clockwork Orange"-esque evocative images sprinkled throughout (shark attacks, bodies being buried, warfare both modern and ancient)."
