= Generation Zero (film) =

2010 American documentary film written and directed by Steve Bannon

- DVD cover
- Directed by: Steve Bannon
- Written by: Steve Bannon
- Produced by: David Bossie
- Starring: John Bolton; Lou Dobbs; Newt Gingrich; Neil Howe; David Kaiser; Charles Krauthammer
- Cinematography: Matthew A. Taylor
- Edited by: Matthew A. Taylor
- Music by: Michael Josephs
- Production company: Citizens United
- Release date: February 5, 2010 (Nashville)
- Running time: 90 minutes
- Country: United States
- Language: English

Generation Zero is a 2010 American documentary film written and directed by Steve Bannon, and produced by David N. Bossie for Citizens United Productions. The documentary features historian David Kaiser as well as author and amateur historian Neil Howe.

In the film, Bannon examines the 2008 financial crisis in the context of a generational theory by authors William Strauss and Neil Howe.

== Synopsis ==
The film examines the subprime mortgage crisis and 2008 financial crisis in a generational context. A 2010 review from The Richmond Times-Dispatch described Generation Zero as a horror film about the U.S economy.

While the film focuses on economic topics, including deficit spending and the 2008 financial crisis, the film also heavily focuses on the 1960s. The film interprets the 1960s in the context of Strauss and Howe's generational theory. In the film, Bannon is critical of his own generation. He commented: that the "baby boomers are the most spoiled, most self-centered, most narcissistic generation the country’s ever produced”, blaming the cohort for much of the current economic problems.

The film describes the 1960s as a time in which young adults turned away from their parents' values, saying they turned their backs on history. The film refers to “seasons of history” and concludes that the damage which was initiated in the 1960s, when young baby boomers turned away from their parents' values, will be undone via war or other great crisis. The period of crisis is referred to as a "turning". In Strauss and Howe's theory, the period of crisis or war is referred to as the “fourth turning”. The film concludes with the line "history is seasonal and winter is coming".

Historian David E. Kaiser, who was consulted for the film said that it focused on a key aspect of Strauss and Howe's theory: "the idea that every 80 years American history has been marked by a crisis, or 'fourth turning', that destroyed an old order and created a new one”. Bannon, Kaiser states, was "very familiar with Strauss and Howe’s theory of crisis, and has been thinking about how to use it to achieve particular goals for quite a while.”

== Reception ==
In 2010, Richmond Times-Dispatch commented "Filmmaker Steve Bannon has put together a genuine horror flick. It's about the U.S. economy."

The film was subject to renewed attention in late 2016 and 2017, after Bannon became Chief Strategist in Donald Trump's administration. The film has been described as apocalyptical and polemical, although anger over the bank bailouts and concern over deficit spending, specifically that "Our government is spending money that we don't have. The longer we wait to fix that problem, the tougher the solution" have been described as issues on which liberals and conservatives may agree. The portion of the film which blames the housing crisis on efforts to help African Americans, specifically on the Community Reinvestment Act, was criticized as inaccurate.

A February 2017 Time magazine cover story titled "Is Steve Bannon the Second Most Powerful Man in the World?" interviewed author Neil Howe. The story reported: "Bannon contacted Howe about making a film based on the book (The Fourth Turning). That eventually led to Generation Zero, released in 2010, in which Bannon cast the 2008 financial crisis as a sign that the turning was upon us. Howe agrees with the analysis, in part. In each cycle, the post-crisis generation, in this case the baby boomers, eventually rises to ‘become the senior leaders who have no memory of the last crisis, and they are always the ones who push us into the next one,’ Howe said. But Bannon ... seemed to relish the opportunity to clean out the old order and build a new one in its place, casting the political events of the nation as moments of extreme historical urgency, pivot points for the world.' Howe said he was struck by what he calls Bannon's 'rather severe outlook on what our nation is going through'."

Historian Sean Wilentz described Strauss and Howe's generational theory depicted in the film as conceit and fiction, while historian Michael Lind described it as pseudoscience.

Historian David Kaiser, who was consulted for the film, reported that Bannon discussed with him what Strauss and Howe considers the past crisis wars, specifically the American Revolutionary War, the American Civil War and World War II. Kaiser said of Bannon, “He expected a new and even bigger war as part of the current crisis, and he did not seem at all fazed by the prospect.” A 2017 review in The Washington Post states, "Bannon now seems to be trying to bring about the Fourth Turning."
