= Steve Bannon =

American media executive and political strategist (born 1953)

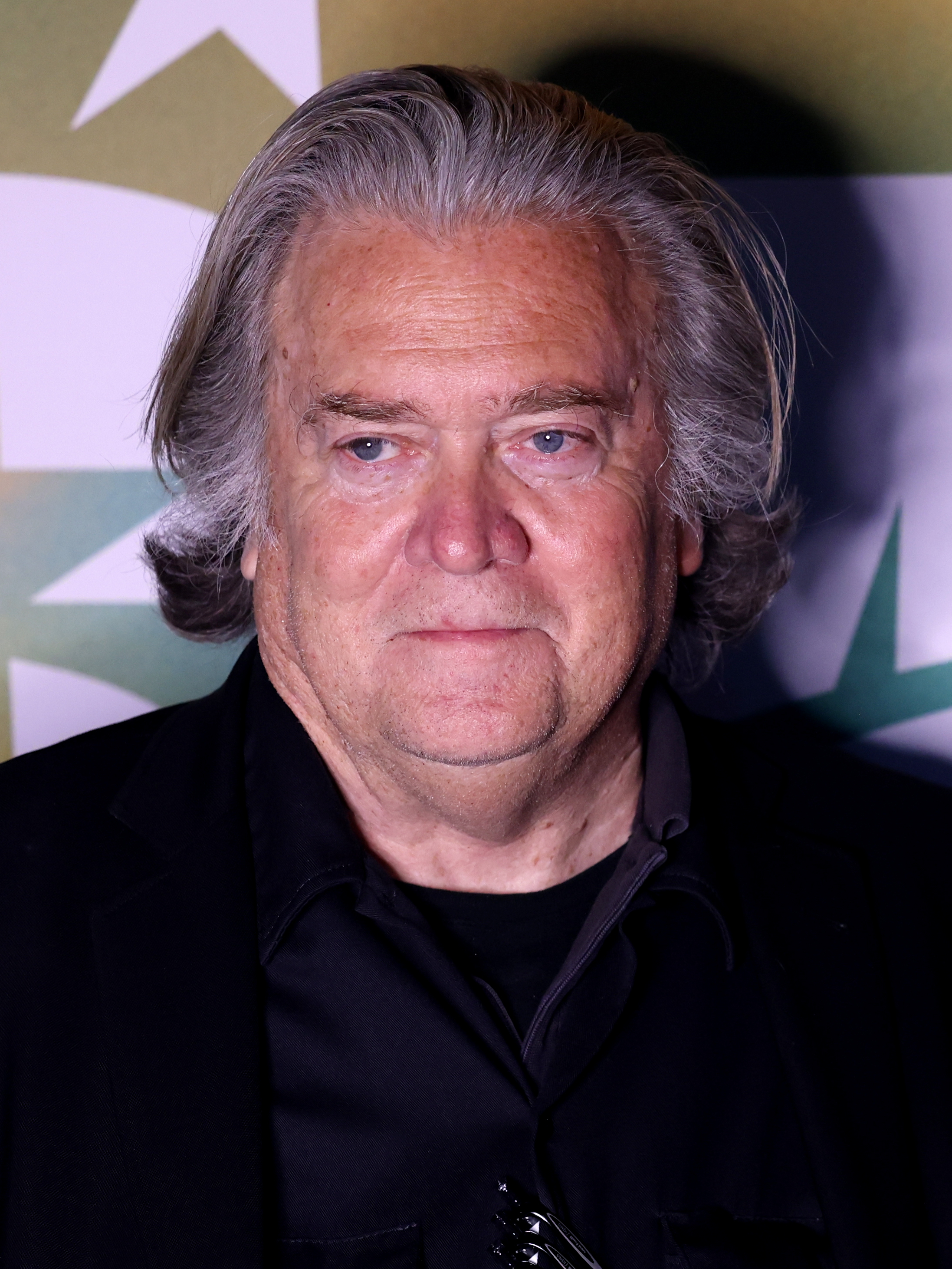
- Bannon in 2025

Senior Counselor to the President
- In office January 20, 2017 – August 18, 2017 Serving with Kellyanne Conway
- President: Donald Trump
- Preceded by: John Podesta (as Counselor, 2015)
- Succeeded by: Kellyanne Conway

White House chief strategist
- In office January 20, 2017 – August 18, 2017
- President: Donald Trump
- Preceded by: Office established
- Succeeded by: Office abolished

Personal details
- Born: Stephen Kevin Bannon; November 27, 1953 (age 72) Norfolk, Virginia, U.S.
- Party: Republican
- Spouses: Cathleen Houff Jordan (div. 1988); Mary Piccard (m. 1995; div. 1997); Diane Clohesy (m. 2006; div. 2009)
- Children: 3
- Education: Virginia Tech (BA); Georgetown University (MA); Harvard University (MBA)

Military service
- Branch/service: United States Navy
- Years of service: 1976–1983
- Rank: Lieutenant (junior grade)
- Criminal information
- Status: Released
- Convictions: July 2022: Contempt of Congress (2 counts); February 2025: scheme to defraud in the first degree (1 count)
- Criminal charges: September 2022: Money laundering; Conspiracy; Scheme to defraud; (New York)
- Penalty: Contempt of Congress: 4 months in prison

Details
- Imprisoned at: Federal Correctional Institution, Danbury, 2024

Stephen Kevin Bannon (born November 27, 1953) is an American media executive, Republican political strategist, pundit and former investment banker. He served as the White House's chief strategist for the first seven months of President Donald Trump's first administration before Trump fired him. He is a former executive chairman of Breitbart News. Since 2019, Bannon has hosted the War Room podcast.

Bannon was an officer in the United States Navy between 1977 and 1983, then worked for two years at Goldman Sachs as an investment banker. In 1993, he became acting director of the research project Biosphere 2. He was an executive producer on 18 Hollywood films from 1991 to 2016. In 2007, he co-founded Breitbart News, a website which he described in 2016 as "the platform for the alt-right". In the mid-2010s, Bannon was a vice president of Cambridge Analytica, a firm that collected data on millions of Facebook users, without their informed consent, for use in Trump's campaign and Brexit, in some cases spreading fake news. Later knowledge of this data breach prompted the Facebook–Cambridge Analytica data scandal.

In 2016, Bannon became the chief executive officer or CEO of Trump's 2016 presidential campaign and was appointed chief strategist and senior counselor to the president following Trump's election. As chief strategist, Bannon urged Trump toward an anti-establishment platform and clashed frequently with other Republicans as well as fellow staff members Reince Priebus and Jared Kushner. He left eight months later and rejoined Breitbart. In 2018, after his criticism of Trump's children was reported in Michael Wolff's book Fire and Fury, he was disavowed by Trump and left Breitbart. After leaving the White House, Bannon opposed the Republican Party establishment and supported insurgent candidates in Republican primary elections. Bannon's reputation as a strategist was questioned when former Alabama Supreme Court chief justice Roy Moore, despite Bannon's support, lost the 2017 United States Senate election in Alabama. Bannon had declared his intention to become "the infrastructure, globally, for the global populist movement". Accordingly, he has supported national populist conservative political movements around the world, including creating a network of far-right groups in Europe. Bannon advised Jeffrey Epstein, the financer and convicted child sex offender, on media relations just prior to his arrest on sex trafficking charges and death in prison in 2019.

In 2020, Bannon and others were arrested on federal charges of conspiracy to commit mail fraud and money laundering connected to the We Build the Wall fundraising campaign. According to the indictment, the defendants promised contributions would go to building a U.S.–Mexico border wall, but instead enriched themselves. Bannon pleaded not guilty. Trump pardoned Bannon, sparing him from a federal trial, but did not pardon his codefendants. Federal pardons do not cover state offenses, and in 2022, Bannon was charged in New York state court with fraud, money laundering, and conspiracy in connection with the campaign. In February 2025, Bannon pleaded guilty to fraud and was sentenced to three years of conditional discharge.

Bannon refused to comply with a subpoena from the January 6 House select committee, so was indicted by a federal grand jury on criminal charges of contempt of Congress. In July 2022, he was convicted and sentenced to four months in prison and a $6,500 fine. After losing his appeal to the U.S. Supreme Court, Bannon surrendered to a federal prison in Danbury, Connecticut, where he was imprisoned from July to October 2024.

== Early life and education ==
Stephen Kevin Bannon was born November 27, 1953, in Norfolk, Virginia, to Doris (née Herr), a homemaker, and Martin J. Bannon Jr., who worked as an AT&T telephone lineman and as a middle manager. He grew up in a working-class family that was pro-Kennedy and pro-union Democrat. He is of Irish and German descent. Much of his mother's side of the family settled in the Baltimore area. Bannon graduated from Benedictine College Preparatory, a private, Catholic, military high school in Richmond, Virginia, in 1971, and then attended Virginia Tech, where he served as the president of the student government association. During the summers he worked at a local junkyard.

In 1976, he graduated from Virginia Tech College of Architecture and Urban Studies with a bachelor's degree in urban planning. While serving in the navy, he earned a master's degree in national security studies in 1983 from Georgetown University School of Foreign Service. In 1985, (Note: Per a Harvard Crimson article, but note that some places mistakenly say Bannon graduated in 1983, which was his *first* year at Harvard according to the Boston Globe.) Bannon earned a Master of Business Administration degree with honors from Harvard Business School.

== Career ==
=== U.S. Navy ===
Bannon was an officer in the United States Navy from 1977 to 1983; he served on the destroyer USS Paul F. Foster as a surface warfare officer in the Pacific Fleet, and afterwards as a special assistant to the chief of naval operations at the Pentagon. Bannon's job at the Pentagon was, among other things, handling messages between senior officers and writing reports about the state of the Navy fleet worldwide. While at the Pentagon, Bannon attended Georgetown University at night and obtained his master's degree in national security studies.

In 1980, Bannon was deployed to the Persian Gulf to assist with Operation Eagle Claw during the Iran hostage crisis. In a 2015 interview, Bannon said that the mission's failure marked a turning point in his political worldview from largely apolitical to strongly Reaganite, which was further reinforced by the September 11 attacks. He recounted,

"I wasn't political until I got into the service and saw how badly Jimmy Carter fucked things up. I became a huge Reagan admirer. Still am. But what turned me against the whole establishment was coming back from running companies in Asia in 2008 and seeing that [George W.] Bush had fucked up as badly as Carter. The whole country was a disaster."

=== Investment banking ===
After his military service, Bannon worked at Goldman Sachs as an investment banker in the Mergers and Acquisitions Department. In 1987, he relocated from New York to Los Angeles, to assist Goldman in expanding their presence in the entertainment industry. He stayed in this position with Goldman in Los Angeles for two years, and left with the title of vice president. (Note: Bannon was erroneously referred to as a "managing partner".)

=== Media and investing ===
In 1990, Bannon and several colleagues from Goldman Sachs launched their own company Bannon & Co., a boutique investment bank specializing in media. In one of Bannon & Co.'s transactions, the firm represented Westinghouse Electric, which wanted to sell Castle Rock Entertainment. Bannon negotiated a sale of Castle Rock to Turner Broadcasting System, which was owned by Ted Turner at the time. Instead of a full adviser's fee, Bannon & Co. accepted a financial stake in five television shows, including Seinfeld, which was in its third season. Bannon still receives cash residuals each time Seinfeld is aired. In 1998, Société Générale purchased Bannon & Co.

=== Earth science ===
In 1993, while still managing Bannon & Co., Bannon became acting director of the earth science research project Biosphere 2 in Oracle, Arizona. Under Bannon, the closed-system experiment project shifted emphasis from researching human space exploration and colonization toward the scientific study of earth's environment, pollution, and climate change. He left the project in 1995.

=== Entertainment and media ===
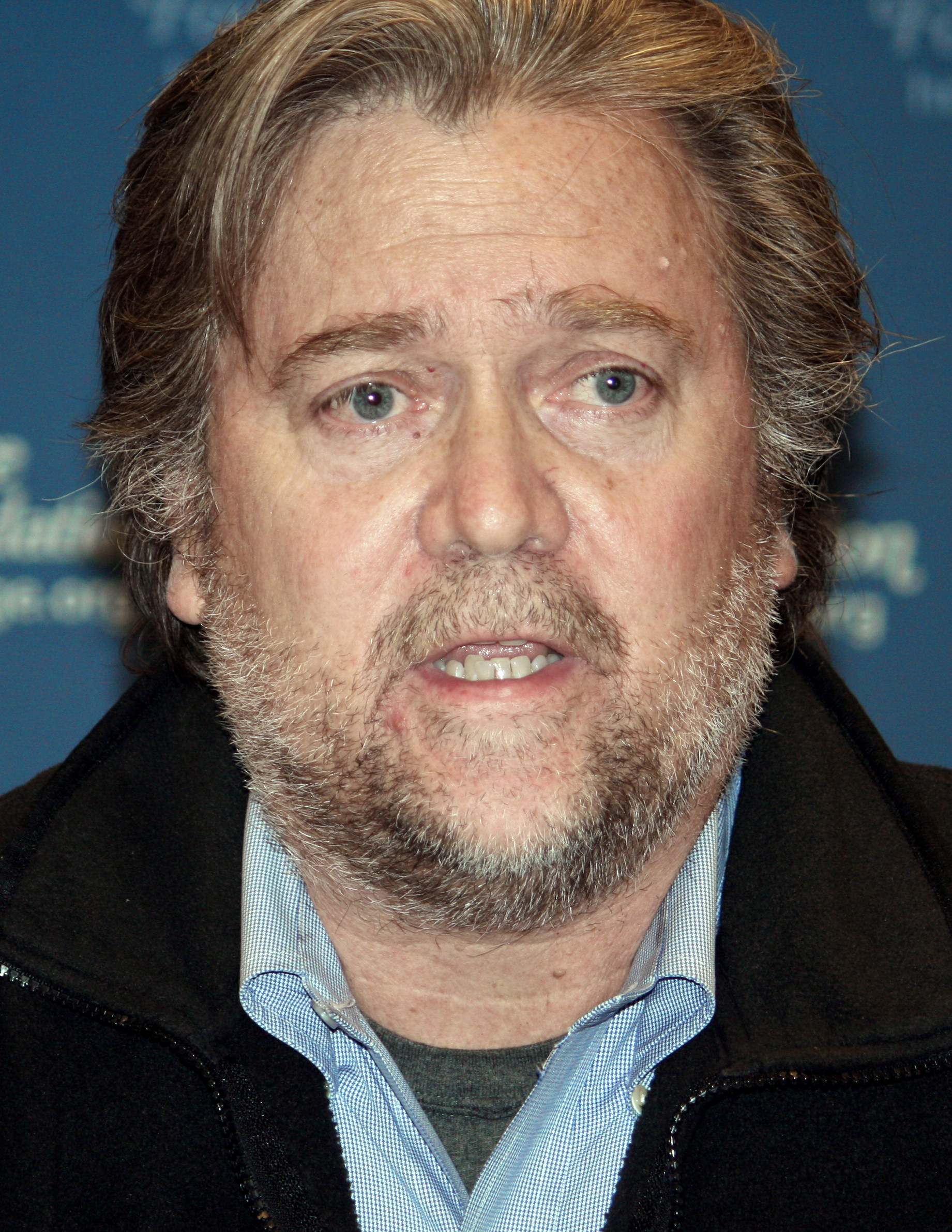
Bannon in 2010

In the 1990s, Bannon ventured into entertainment and media and became a Hollywood film and media executive producer. Bannon produced 18 films, including Sean Penn's drama The Indian Runner (1991), and Julie Taymor's film Titus (1999). Bannon became a partner with entertainment industry executive Jeff Kwatinetz at film and television management company The Firm, Inc., where he served in 2002 and 2003.

In 2004, Bannon made a documentary about Ronald Reagan, In the Face of Evil. While making and screening the film, Bannon met Reagan's War author Peter Schweizer and publisher Andrew Breitbart, who described him as the Leni Riefenstahl of the Tea Party movement. Other films Bannon financed and produced include Fire from the Heartland: The Awakening of the Conservative Woman (2010), The Undefeated (2011), and Occupy Unmasked (2012).

In 2006, Bannon persuaded Goldman Sachs to invest in a company known as Internet Gaming Entertainment. Following a lawsuit, the company rebranded as Affinity Media, and Bannon took over as CEO. From 2007 through 2011, Bannon was the chair and CEO of Affinity Media.

In 2007, Bannon wrote an eight-page treatment for another documentary, Destroying the Great Satan: The Rise of Islamic Fascism in America. The outline states, "although driven by the 'best intentions,' institutions such as the media, the Jewish community and government agencies were appeasing jihadists aiming to create an Islamic republic." In 2011, Bannon spoke at the Liberty Restoration Foundation in Orlando, Florida, about the 2008 financial crisis, the Troubled Assets Relief Program, and their impact in the origins of the Tea Party movement, and his films Generation Zero (2010) and The Undefeated.

==== Breitbart News ====
In 2007, Bannon was a founding board member of Breitbart News, a far-right news, opinion and commentary website. Philip Elliott and Zeke J. Miller of Time have said that the site has "pushed racist, sexist, xenophobic and antisemitic material into the vein of the alternative right". Bannon said that Breitbart's ideological mix included libertarians, Zionists, the conservative gay community, same-sex marriage opponents, economic nationalists, populists, as well as the alt-right, with the alt-right comprising a very small proportion overall. Conceding the alt-right holds views with "racial and anti-Semitic overtones", Bannon said he has zero tolerance for such views.

In March 2012, following the death of Breitbart News founder Andrew Breitbart, Bannon became executive chairman of Breitbart News LLC, the parent company of Breitbart News. Under his leadership, Breitbart's editorial tone became more nationalistic, and also became increasingly friendly to the alt-right. In 2016, Bannon declared the website "the platform for the alt-right". Speaking about his role at Breitbart, Bannon said, "We think of ourselves as virulently anti-establishment, particularly 'anti-' the permanent political class." Ben Shapiro, a former Breitbart editor and colleague of Bannon, called Bannon a "'bully' who 'sold out [Breitbart founder] Andrew's mission in order to back another bully, Donald Trump.'"

On August 18, 2017, Breitbart announced that Bannon would return as executive chairman following his period of employment at the White House. Because of the break with Trump, Bannon's position as head of Breitbart News was called into question by Breitbart's owners. On January 9, 2018, five months after his appointment, he stepped down as executive chairman. The billionaire funders of Breitbart, Robert and Rebekah Mercer, reportedly decided to push Bannon out from Breitbart, in part because of his break with Trump and in part because they had become weary of Bannon's "impulsive and attention-seeking antics" and Bannon's expenditures on "travel and private security".

Bannon hosted a radio show, Breitbart News Daily, on the SiriusXM Patriot satellite radio channel.

==== Other media activities ====
In 2005, Bannon secured $60 million in funding from Goldman Sachs and other investors for Internet Gaming Entertainment (IGE), a company based in Hong Kong that employed "low-wage Chinese workers" to play World of Warcraft, a massively multiplayer online role-playing game, to earn gold in-game that could be traded for virtual items, which could then be sold to players of the video game for real money.

While some gamers liked IGE's offers of World of Warcraft money that would typically take hours to farm, other gamers called it cheating. Many gamers responded by posting anti-Chinese vitriol. Blizzard Entertainment, the video game's owners, eventually shut down accounts used by gold farmers. IGE was also the target of a class action lawsuit by a player who said IGE's practices were "substantially impairing" people's enjoyment of the game.

While IGE's business model failed, Bannon became interested in the game's online community, describing its members as "rootless white males, [who] had monster power". Through Breitbart News editor Milo Yiannopoulos, whom Bannon recruited, Bannon realized that he could "activate that army" of gamers and Internet trolls, adding in 2017, "They come in through Gamergate or whatever and then get turned onto politics and Trump."

Since 2019, Bannon has hosted Bannon's War Room on Robert J. Sigg's Real America's Voice television network, podcast platforms, and radio.

=== Government Accountability Institute ===
Bannon was executive chair and co-founder of the Government Accountability Institute, a tax-exempt 501(c)(3) organization where he helped orchestrate the publication of Breitbart News senior Editor-at-large Peter Schweizer's book Clinton Cash, from its founding in 2012 until his departure in August 2016. The organization creates indictments against politicians using the deep web, tax filings, flight logs, and foreign government documents and then forwards their findings to the media. The organization is registered as nonpartisan but it mainly investigates alleged corruption, crony capitalism, and misuse of taxpayer money within the Democratic Party. The group has spread conspiracy theories about Hillary Clinton and Joe Biden. For the years 2012 through 2015, he received between $81,000 and $100,000 each year; the organization reported that Bannon worked an average of 30 hours per week for the organization.

=== Cambridge Analytica ===
Bannon served as vice president of the board of Cambridge Analytica, a data-analytics firm owned largely by the Mercer family, who also co-owns Breitbart News; the firm allegedly used illegal tactics to target American voters in the 2016 election. According to former Analytica employee Christopher Wylie, Bannon oversaw the collection of Facebook data which was used to target American voters. Wylie who helped with creation of the company referred to the company as a "psychological warfare tool". Bannon was paid more than $125,000 for his work at Cambridge Analytica. Bannon's stake in Cambridge Analytica was estimated at $1–5 million, but he sold his stake in the company once he joined the Trump administration in April 2017.

=== The Movement ===
In 2017, Bannon founded the Movement, a populist organization which frequently promotes right wing populist groups in Europe which are against the EU government and political system in Europe. The group is also known for its opposition to George Soros's Open Society Foundations, Bannon has referred to Soros as "evil but brilliant". As of 2018, the organization employed 10 full-time staff members. Mischaël Modrikamen, the leader of the Belgian People's Party, serves as executive director. The organization has received praise from figures like Prime Minister Viktor Orbán and Italian Eurosceptic party M5S leader Luigi Di Maio.

== Working for Donald Trump ==
=== Donald Trump 2016 presidential campaign ===
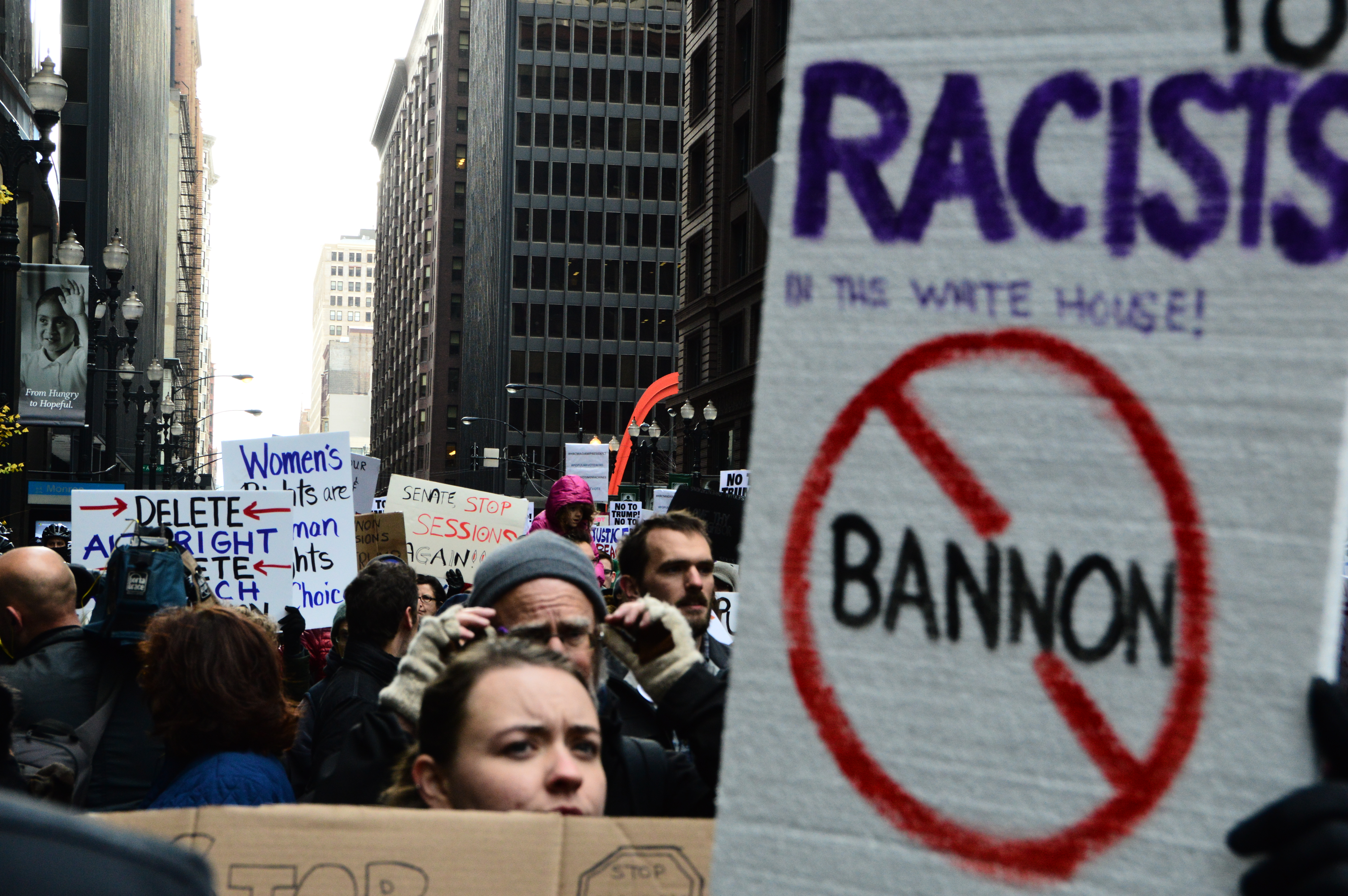
A placard criticizing Bannon at an anti-Trump protest in November 2016

On August 17, 2016, with 88 days until the 2016 presidential election, Bannon was appointed chief executive of Donald Trump's presidential campaign. Bannon left Breitbart, the Government Accountability Institute and Cambridge Analytica, to take the job. Shortly after he had assumed the chief executive role, the chairman of the Trump campaign, Paul Manafort, was dismissed.

On November 13, following Donald Trump's election to the presidency, Bannon was appointed chief strategist and senior counselor to the president-elect. His appointment drew opposition from the Anti-Defamation League (ADL), the Council on American–Islamic Relations, the Southern Poverty Law Center, Democratic Senate minority leader Harry Reid, and some Republican strategists because of statements in Breitbart News that were alleged to be racist or antisemitic. However, a number of prominent politically conservative Jews defended Bannon against the allegations of antisemitism, including Ben Shapiro, David Horowitz, Pamela Geller, Bernard Marcus of the Republican Jewish Coalition, Morton Klein, the Zionist Organization of America, and Rabbi Shmuley Boteach. Alan Dershowitz at first defended Bannon, saying there was no evidence he was antisemitic, but then in a later piece stated that Bannon had made bigoted statements against Muslims, women, and others. The ADL stated "We are not aware of any anti-Semitic statements from Bannon." Bannon had referred to French National Front (now National Rally) politician Marion Maréchal-Le Pen as "the new rising star".

On November 15, 2016, U.S. representative David Cicilline of Rhode Island released a letter to Trump signed by 169 Democratic House representatives urging the president-elect to rescind his appointment of Bannon. The letter stated that appointing Bannon "sends a disturbing message about what kind of president Donald Trump wants to be", because his "ties to the White Nationalist movement have been well documented"; it went on to present several examples of Breitbart News's alleged xenophobia. Bannon denied being a white nationalist and said, rather, that he was an "economic nationalist".

On November 18, during his first interview not conducted by Breitbart Media since the 2016 presidential election, Bannon remarked on some criticisms made about him, saying, "Darkness is good: Dick Cheney. Darth Vader. Satan. That's power. It only helps us when they get it wrong. When they're blind to who we are and what we're doing." The quote was published widely in the media.

In an interview with The New York Times in late November, Trump responded to the controversy over Bannon's appointment, saying, "I've known Steve Bannon a long time. If I thought he was a racist, or alt-right, or any of the things that we can, you know, the terms we can use, I wouldn't even think about hiring him."

In an interview with BBC Newsnight, Bannon said that his role was to "recalibrate" the campaign, which had at that point lost its message. He "stepped in and got the campaign refocused", but he rebuffed the idea that he was the reason Trump won the presidency, saying "Trump is unique in American political history, he's his own closer." Bannon said his role was to make sure that Hillary Clinton was held up as a "guardian of a corrupt and incompetent establishment" and this was key to winning votes in states that Trump needed to win.

Reuters reported on October 31, 2018, that the Senate Intelligence Committee was conducting a "wide-ranging" investigation of Bannon's activities during the campaign, including knowledge he may have had about any contacts between Russia and two campaign advisors, George Papadopoulos and Carter Page, as well as his role with Cambridge Analytica.

=== Trump's first administration ===
==== Transition to the presidency ====
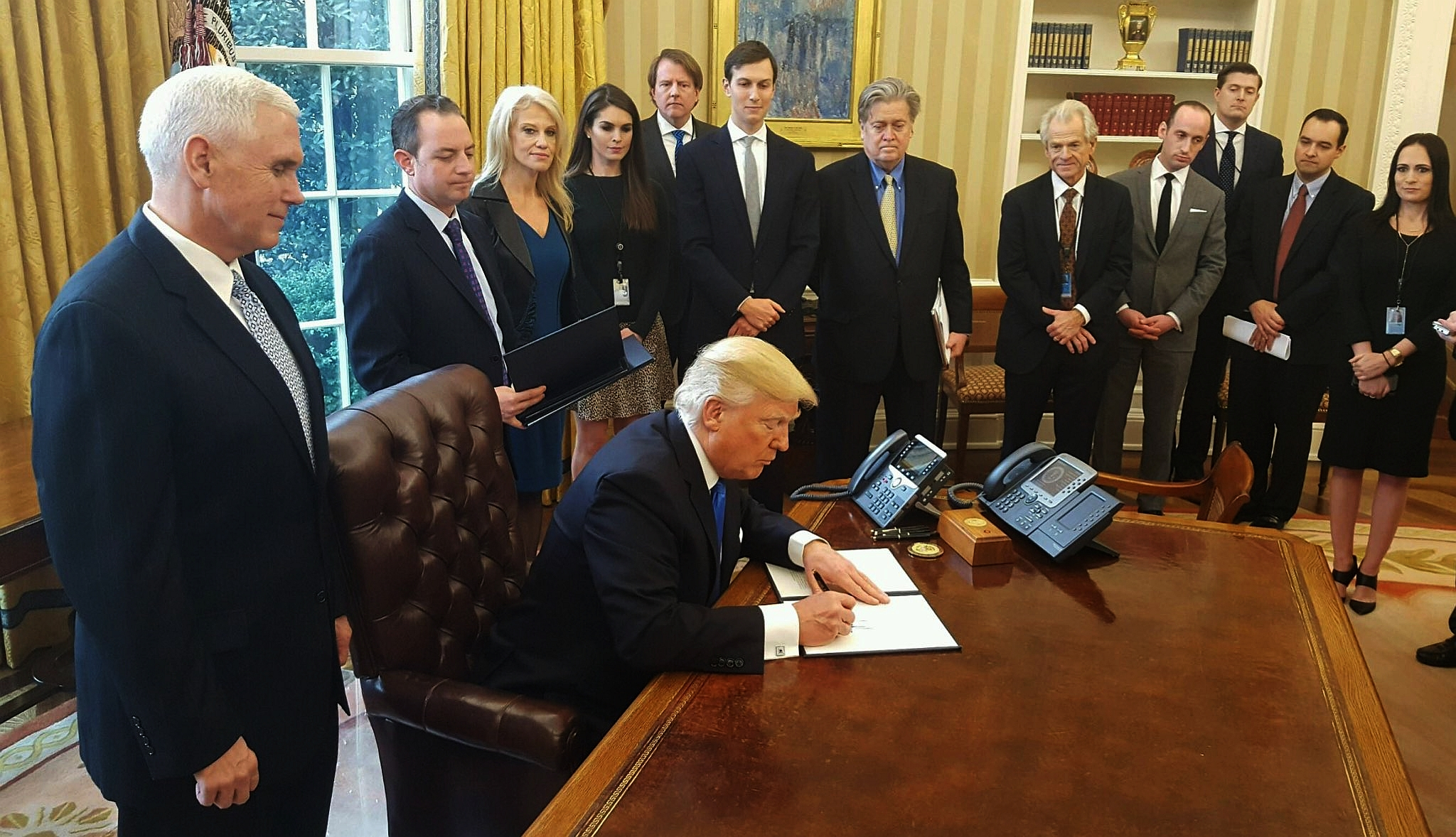
Bannon and other advisors watching Trump sign an executive order in the Oval Office in January 2017

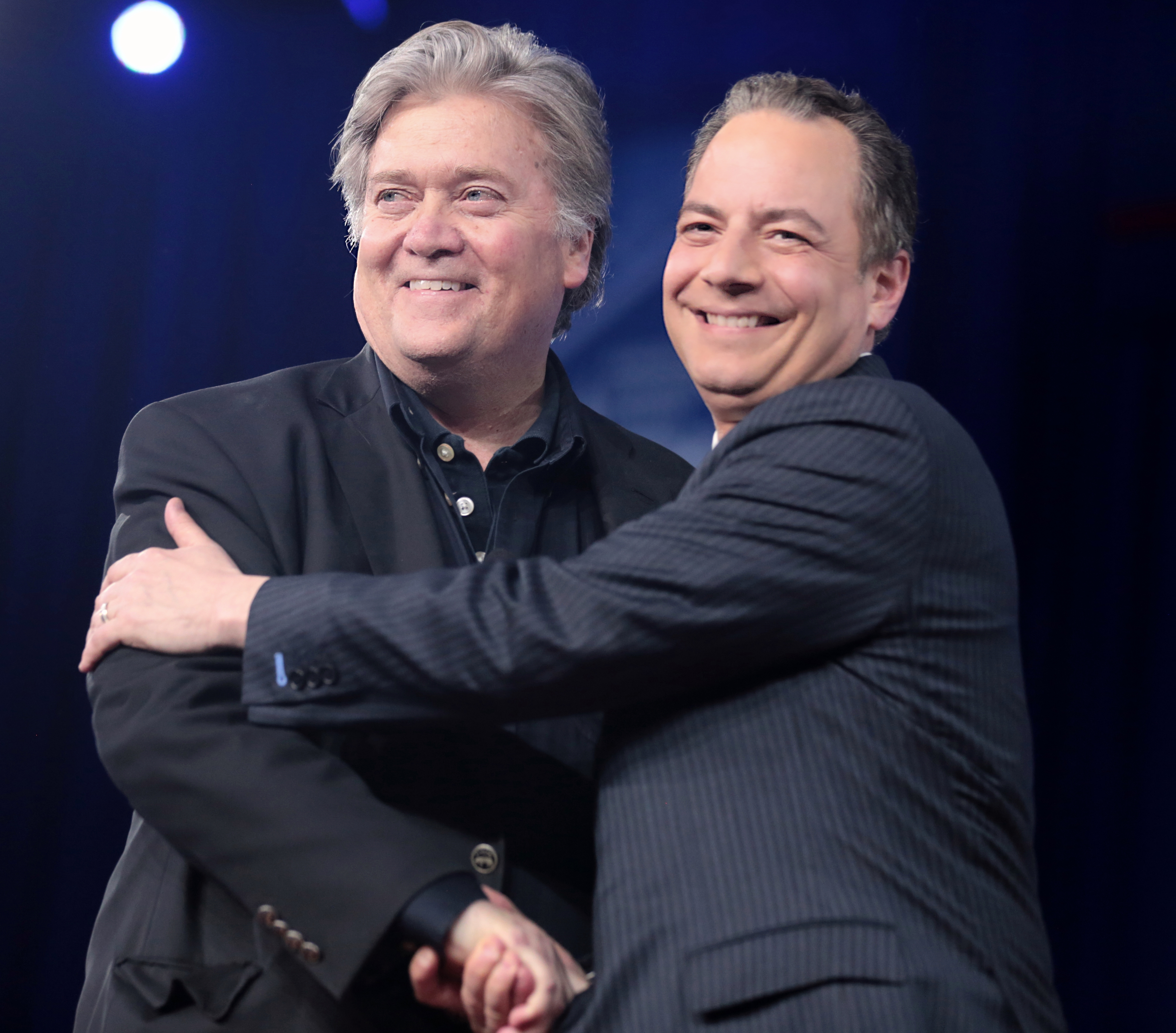
Bannon shakes hands with White House chief of staff Reince Priebus at 2017 CPAC.

In 2018, Michael Lewis published a quote ascribed to Bannon, made while the transition team for Trump was supposed to be preparing for the next administration, and The Guardian used it twice in the title of an excerpt from the 2018 Lewis book The Fifth Risk. The book examined the difference between the transition preparations provided by the administration that was exiting and what did or did not occur, and it revealed a profound lack of preparedness and concern, as expressed in the quote.

==== National Security Council ====
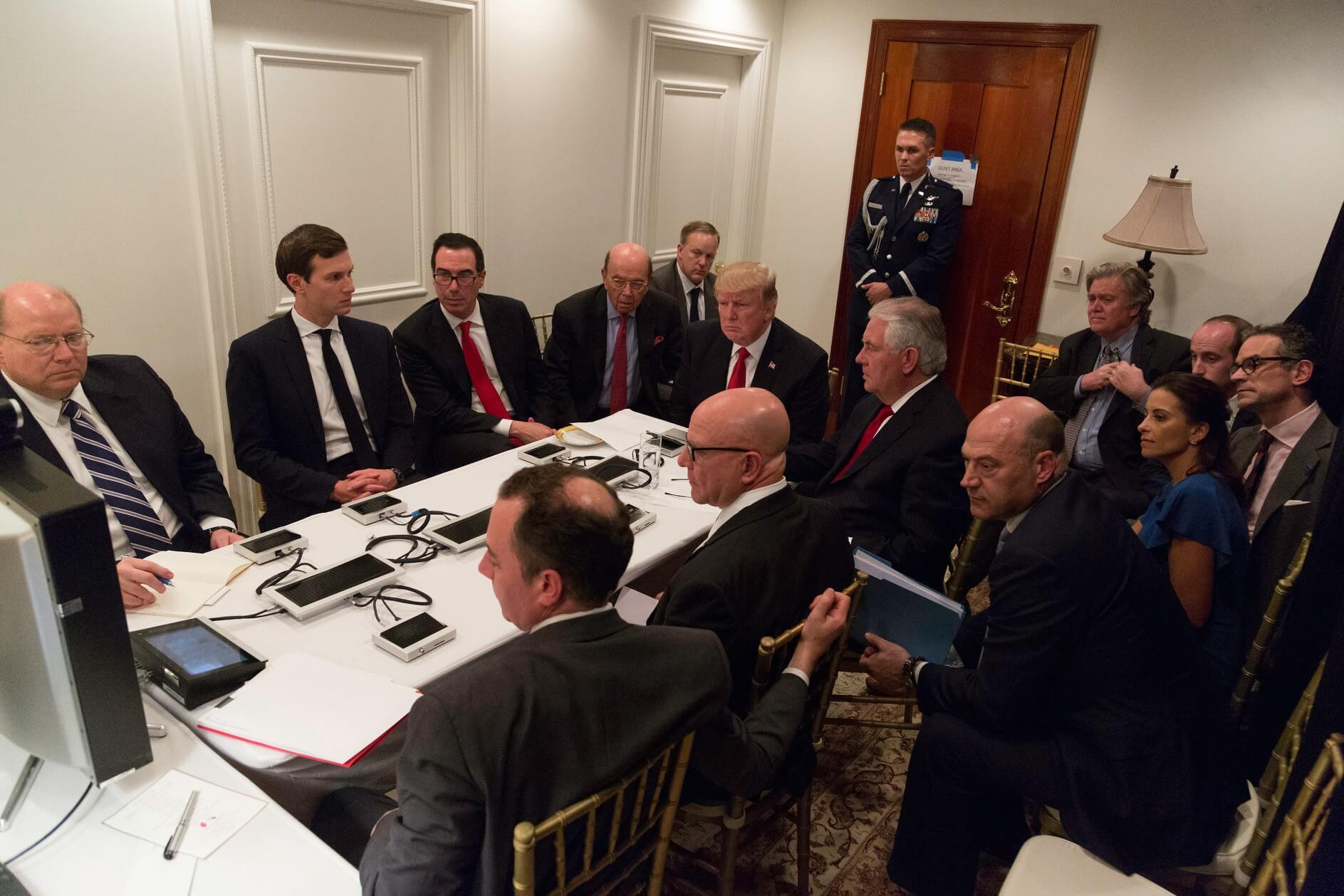
Bannon during the April 2017 Syrian missile strike operation

At the end of January 2017, in a departure from the previous format of the National Security Council (NSC), the holder of Bannon's position, along with that of the chief of staff, were designated by presidential memorandum as regular attendees to the NSC's Principals Committee, a Cabinet-level senior inter-agency forum for considering national security issues. The enacted arrangement was criticized by several members of previous administrations and was called "stone cold crazy" by Susan E. Rice, Barack Obama's last national security adviser. In response, White House press secretary Sean Spicer pointed to Bannon's seven years experience as a Navy officer in justifying his presence on the committee.

Bannon never attended an NSC principals meeting. He and Jared Kushner created a body named the Strategic Initiatives Group within the NSC. The Strategic Initiatives Group never got off the ground, and members like Sebastian Gorka failed to obtain the security clearance necessary for work on national security issues. Bannon also attempted to include Michael Pillsbury to the group.

==== Presidency of Donald Trump ====
Upon his inauguration, Trump appointed Bannon to be his chief strategist, a newly created position. The title made him a counselor to the president, nearly equivalent in authority to the chief of staff. As a staff member in the Executive Office of the President, the position did not require Senate confirmation. Breitbart News editor Julia Hahn followed Bannon to the White House, where she was appointed as Bannon's aide, as well as special assistant to President Trump.

In an interview with The Hollywood Reporter in the aftermath of the 2016 election, Bannon analogized his influence with Trump to that of "Thomas Cromwell in the court of the Tudors".

Several days after Trump's inauguration, on January 26, Bannon told The New York Times, "The media should be embarrassed and humiliated and keep its mouth shut and just listen for a while. I want you to quote this: the media here is the opposition party. They don't understand this country. They still do not understand why Donald Trump is the president of the United States."

Bannon and Stephen Miller were involved in the creation of Executive Order 13769, which resulted in restricted U.S. travel and immigration by individuals from seven countries, suspension of the United States Refugee Admissions Program (USRAP) for 120 days, and indefinite suspension of the entry of Syrians to the United States. According to The Economist, a British news magazine, Bannon and Miller "see Mr [Vladimir] Putin as a fellow nationalist and crusader against cosmopolitanism".

"Bannon Says Corporatist Global Media Opposed to Economic Nationalist Agenda" video from Voice of America recorded at the Conservative Political Action Conference in 2017

In February 2017, Bannon appeared on the cover of Time, on which he was labeled "the Great Manipulator". The headline used for the associated article was "Is Steve Bannon the Second Most Powerful Man in the World?", alluding to Bannon's perceived influence in the White House.

In a March 14, 2019, hearing of the House Committee on Oversight and Government Reform, Commerce Department secretary Wilbur Ross was questioned about his conversations regarding the adding of a citizenship question to the 2020 census surveys, which he had with Bannon, who in turn had referred him to immigration hardliners Kris Kobach and Attorney General Jeff Sessions. Missouri Democratic representative Lacy Clay accused Ross of being "complicit" regarding his efforts to weaken minority group voting rights, additionally accusing him of committing perjury with respect to those contacts. Clay called for Ross to tender his resignation, saying, "You lied to Congress. You misled the American people and you are complicit in the Trump administration's intent to suppress the growing political power of the non-white population." Ross said the change was in response to a request by the Justice Department for statistics to protect voting rights. On April 23, 2019, the United States Supreme Court heard arguments regarding appeals of rejections by three circuit courts of the proposed inclusion of the survey question.

It was reported that Bannon intentionally published stories to undermine H. R. McMaster. Bannon allegedly did this by leaking information to the alternative media, including alt-right writer Mike Cernovich. It was also reported that the Trump administration retroactively granted Bannon a blanket exemption from federal ethics rules that allowed him to communicate with editors at Breitbart News, which according to former Breitbart consultant Kurt Bardella would be proof of the administration's intent to allow him to continue being "the de facto editorial director of Breitbart" (italics added). In the final hours of Donald Trump's administration, Steve Bannon was issued a presidential pardon. The accompanying announcement said he was "an important leader in the conservative movement and is known for his political acumen".

Bannon was removed from his NSC role in early April 2017 in a reorganization by U.S. national security advisor H. R. McMaster, whom Bannon had helped select. Some White House officials said Bannon's main purpose in serving on the committee was as a check against former national security advisor Michael T. Flynn, who had resigned in February 2017 for misleading the vice president about a conversation with the Russian ambassador to the United States. Hence, with Flynn gone, Bannon was no longer needed. Bannon reportedly opposed his removal from the council and threatened to quit if President Trump went forward with it, although Republican megadonor Rebekah Mercer urged him to stay. The White House said Bannon had not attempted to leave, and Bannon said any indication that he threatened resignation was "total nonsense". Bannon only attended one NSC meeting.

==== Russia investigation ====
Bannon was interviewed multiple times by Robert Mueller as part of the investigation into Russian interference in the 2016 United States presidential election. Bannon was reportedly interviewed about Roger Stone's contact with WikiLeaks. In November 2019, Bannon gave evidence in the federal criminal trial of Roger Stone. Bannon did not voluntarily testify; rather, he was compelled to give evidence under subpoena. Bannon testified that Stone was WikiLeaks' access point for the Trump campaign; the testimony helped establish that Stone lied to Congress. Stone was subsequently convicted on all charges (lying to Congress and witness tampering), but on July 10, 2020, his federal prison sentence was commuted by President Trump. Asked for a comment after Bannon himself was arrested on August 20, 2020, Stone replied, "Karma is a bitch. But I am praying for him."

In August 2020, members of the Senate intelligence committee told the Department of Justice (DOJ) that they believed that Bannon, Jared Kushner, and Donald Trump Jr. may have misled them with their testimony about Russia investigation.

== Post–White House career ==
=== Departure from the White House ===
Bannon's employment in the White House ended on August 18, 2017, less than a week after the August 11–12, 2017, Charlottesville Unite the Right rally which degenerated into violence and acrimony. Whereas members of both political parties condemned the hatred and violence of white nationalists, neo-Nazis and alt-right activists, The New York Times noted that Trump "was the only national political figure to spread blame for the 'hatred, bigotry and violence' that resulted in the death of one person to 'many sides'." The decision to blame "many sides" was reported to have come from Bannon. The NAACP released a statement saying that while they "acknowledge and appreciate President Trump's disavowment of the hatred which has resulted in a loss of life today", they called on Trump "to take the tangible step to remove Steve Bannon – a well-known white supremacist leader – from his team of advisers". The statement further described Bannon as a "symbol of white nationalism" who "energized that sentiment" through his position within the White House.

Some sources stated that White House chief of staff John F. Kelly asked Bannon on August 18, 2017, to submit his immediate resignation in lieu of being fired. Bannon, however, stated he was not fired but rather submitted his two-week resignation notice on August 4, 2017. He reminded The Weekly Standard that he had joined then-presidential candidate Trump's campaign on August 14, 2016, and said he'd "always planned on spending one year", but that he stayed a few more days due to the Unite the Right rally in Charlottesville, Virginia.

In an official statement, White House press secretary Sarah Huckabee Sanders said: "John Kelly and Steve Bannon have mutually agreed today would be Steve's last day. We are grateful for his service and wish him the best." The same day, Breitbart News announced that Bannon would return to the site as executive chairman. Several weeks after his departure it was reported that Trump still called Bannon using his personal cell phone and was only calling when chief of staff Kelly was not around. The Washington Post reported in October 2017 that Trump and Bannon remained in regular contact.

==== Quotes in Michael Wolff books ====
In January 2018, upon the publication of Michael Wolff's book Fire and Fury: Inside the Trump White House, which attributed many controversial and inflammatory statements to Bannon, Bannon and Trump became estranged and were widely seen as enemies. The book quoted Bannon as saying that Ivanka Trump was "as dumb as a brick"; that the meeting among Donald Trump Jr., Jared Kushner, Paul Manafort, and agents of Russia was "treasonous"; and that Special Prosecutor Robert Mueller would cause Donald Trump Jr. to "crack like an egg on live television". Bannon also warned that investigators would likely uncover money laundering involving Jared Kushner and his family business loans from Deutsche Bank.

In his 2019 book Siege, Wolff wrote, "Trump was vulnerable because for 40 years he had run what increasingly seemed to resemble a semi-criminal enterprise," then quoted Bannon as saying, "I think we can drop the 'semi' part." Wolff wrote that Bannon predicted investigations into Trump's finances would be his political downfall, quoting Bannon as saying, "This is where it isn't a witch hunt – even for the hard core, this is where he turns into just a crooked business guy, and one worth $50 million instead of $10 billion. Not the billionaire he said he was, just another scumbag."

Quotes in War for Eternity

In the 2020 book War for Eternity by Benjamin R. Teitelbaum, Bannon described seeing himself as an ideologue and thinker and Trump as only an actor: “[H]e is a man of action. The power of men of action is that...you don't have to read books and think about the cycles. You just do it." Bannon also referred to Trump as "a man in time," a term which Teitelbaum speculated could have come from ultra-reactionary, pro-Hitler writer Savitri Devi. In the same book Bannon also described having held a day-long meeting with Russian ideologue Alexander Dugin in Rome, Italy, in November 2018 during which the two discussed their shared interest in Julius Evola and Bannon pressed Dugin to lobby for aligning Russia with the U.S. against China. Brazilian philosopher Olavo de Carvalho, who was a prominent supporter of Jair Bolsonaro, met with Bannon throughout 2019. Carvalho later told Teitelbaum that "Bannon believes in an alliance between the United States and Russia...And of course if he asks me to help him, I will."

==== Relationship with Donald Trump ====
In January 2018, after excerpts from Fire and Fury were published, Trump promptly disavowed Bannon, saying that Bannon "lost his mind" when he left the White House, and attacking him in multiple angry statements. Trump asserted in a tweet that Bannon had "cried when he got fired and begged for his job" and publicly referred to Bannon with an unflattering nickname ("Sloppy Steve") in reference to Bannon's usually disheveled appearance. On January 7, 2018, Bannon expressed regret over his delayed response, declared his "unwavering" support for Trump and his agenda, and praised Donald Trump Jr. Bannon said his remarks about the campaign meeting were aimed at Manafort instead of Trump Jr., a detail which Wolff contested.

Despite Trump's disparagement of him, Bannon retained ties with Trump. In an appearance in August 2019 on CNBC, Bannon praised Trump as a "great leader as president" and "amazing campaigner"; in response, Trump called Bannon "one of my best pupils" and "still a giant Trump fan" and said he "loved working with" Bannon. In 2018, Bannon released a pro-Trump documentary, Trump @War through his production company, Victory Films; the film aimed to galvanize Trump supporters ahead of the 2018 elections in a bid to keep a Republican majority in the House. In October 2019, Bannon began co-hosting War Room: Impeachment, a daily radio show and podcast in which he offered advice to the Trump administration and its allies on how to counter the impeachment inquiry against Donald Trump. In 2020, Bannon began a podcast War Room: Pandemic, broadcast from his Capitol Hill townhouse; Bannon told friends that Trump had "told others that he watches the program and that the president was familiar enough with it to cite specific interviews he had seen when the two men spoke this summer". A February 2023 Brookings Institution study found Bannon's podcast contained the highest proportion of false, misleading and unsubstantiated statements among 36,603 episodes produced by 79 prominent political podcasters.

=== Republican Senate primaries ===
Bannon has made efforts to unseat incumbent Republican members of Congress he deemed to be insufficiently supportive of Trump's agenda. In October 2017, Bannon said he planned to sponsor primary challenges against six of the seven incumbent Republican senators in the 2018 elections. He said he had two requirements for a candidate to earn his support: they must pledge to vote against Mitch McConnell as Senate majority leader and to end the Senate filibuster. Bannon used his group Citizens of the American Republic to aid him in his efforts to help keep Republican control of the House of Representatives in the 2018 election. The group is a dark money organization; Bannon declined to "describe his donors or how much money the group has raised".

Bannon received credit for helping Roy Moore defeat incumbent senator Luther Strange in the September Republican primary for the 2017 special Alabama Senate election, despite Trump's having endorsed Strange. After nine women alleged sexual misconduct, Bannon doubled down on his support for the candidate, raising doubt about the veracity of the accusations. When Ivanka Trump condemned Moore's campaign in Alabama, saying "there's a special place in hell for people who prey on children", Bannon responded, "What about the allegations about her dad and that 13-year-old?", in reference to a woman who accused Trump and sex offender Jeffrey Epstein of raping her at that age.

In what had been considered a safe Republican seat, Moore lost the election on December 12, 2017. Bannon's reputation as a political strategist was subsequently questioned by Republican commentators.

=== Work abroad ===
After leaving the White House in August 2017, Bannon declared his intention to become "the infrastructure, globally, for the global populist movement". He toured Europe to speak at events with various far-right political parties there, in a bid to build a network of right-wing populist-nationalist parties aspiring to government. Bannon visited the Dutch Party for Freedom, the Freedom Party of Austria in October 2017, the UK Conservative Party in December 2017, the Swiss People's Party in March 2018, the UK Independence Party, the Flemish Vlaams Belang, the Belgian People's Party, Alternative for Germany in March 2018, France's National Front (now the National Rally) in March 2018, the Italian League, the Brothers of Italy in September 2018, Hungary's Fidesz in March 2018, the Sweden Democrats in March 2018, the Polish Law and Justice in September 2018, Spain's Vox in July 2018, the Finns Party in July 2018, the pan-European identitarian movement in March 2018, Republika Srpska's Alliance of Independent Social Democrats in August 2018, the Five Star Movement in May 2019, and the Israeli Likud. Bannon believes that these movements – along with Japan's Shinzo Abe, India's Narendra Modi, Russia's Vladimir Putin, Saudi Arabia's Mohammad bin Salman, China's Xi Jinping, Turkey's Recep Tayyip Erdoğan, and Trump, as well as similar leaders in Egypt, the Philippines, Poland, and South Korea – are part of a global shift towards nationalism.

Bannon's attempt to build a network of far-right parties in Europe had only limited success; while he appeared at events with the French National Rally's Marine Le Pen and the Italian League's Matteo Salvini, the Sweden Democrats said that it had "no interest" in Bannon's initiative, the Flemish Vlaams Belang called it "poorly organized", and the Alternative for Germany cited divergent views among the parties. Right-wing populist parties did not achieve a surge in support in the 2019 European Parliament elections. The Atlantic cited a number of factors inhibiting Bannon's project, including differing national and ideological views among the European far right and U.S.-skeptical views held by some parties of the European extreme right. Bannon met with Tino Chrupalla and pledged to support the AfD in their campaign for the 2019 Saxony state election.

Bannon supports the Dignitatis Humanae Institute, a right-wing Catholic organization in Italy formerly based in what was previously Trisulti Charterhouse; Bannon drafted a leadership course curriculum for the group to train conservative Catholic political activists. In 2018, Bannon announced that he planned to establish a right-wing academy on the site, with the support of Benjamin Harnwell, a British associate of Bannon's who underwrote the project and aimed to create a "gladiator school for culture warriors". However, in 2019, the group's rights to use the former monastery were revoked by the Italian government because it determined that the lessee Dignitatis Humanae Institute failed to meet several criteria to operate the monastery and failed in its obligation to pay a "concession fee" as well as maintenance and security expenses.

In August 2018, Bannon met with Eduardo Bolsonaro, the son of far-right candidate Jair Bolsonaro, and served as informal advisor to the Bolsonaro campaign in the Brazilian presidential elections that year. In February 2019, the younger Bolsonaro joined Bannon's organization the Movement as its representative in South America. In March 2019, Bannon met with both Bolsonaros in Washington, D.C.

In October 2017, after leaving the White House, Bannon met exiled Chinese billionaire businessman Guo Wengui (also known as Miles Kwok), and the pair cultivated a friendship, frequently meeting in Dallas, at Guo's apartment at the Sherry-Netherland in New York, and on Guo's yacht. In 2017, Guo reportedly gave a $150,000 loan to Bannon shortly after he left the White House, and a Guo-linked company entered into a $1 million consulting contract with Bannon, beginning in August 2018. In early 2020, Bannon and Guo raised hundreds of millions of dollars in a private offering for a company called GTV Media Group. In August 2020, the Wall Street Journal reported that the fundraising for the company was under investigation of federal and state authorities.

Guo has allowed Bannon to use one of his two private jets, and during the 2018 election campaign, Bannon flew on Guo's Bombardier Global Express to events in support of Republican congressional candidates in New Mexico and Arizona. The flights were revealed in February 2020 by ProPublica. Bannon made the flights under the auspices of his dark money group, Citizens of the American Republic. Several campaign finance experts who spoke with ProPublica said the trips could violate federal campaign finance law, which prohibits foreign nationals from making contributions to candidates in U.S. political campaigns (including in-kind contributions such as payment for campaign-related travel). Guo and Bannon denied that the travel was for campaign activity; an attorney for Bannon's group stated that the trips on the private jet were to promote Bannon's film, Trump@War.

On June 3, 2020, Bannon and Guo participated in declaring a "New Federal State of China" (also called "Federal State of New China"). It was said that they would overthrow the Chinese government. In New York City, planes were seen carrying banners which said, "Congratulations to Federal State of New China!".

On August 20, 2020, federal prosecutors in New York unsealed criminal charges against Stephen K. Bannon and three other men they alleged defrauded donors to a massive crowdfunding campaign that said it was raising money for construction of a wall along the U.S.-Mexico border. After Bannon's arrest, Guo Wengui hurriedly cut ties with him, stressed that he was not involved in Bannon's affairs outside their shared efforts "fighting for democracy in China", and would no longer allow Bannon to continue to serve as a member of Guo Media's board of directors.

In November 2020, The New York Times reported that Bannon along with Guo Wengui had been promoting Li-Meng Yan's account of COVID-19. The pair had bought Yan a plane ticket to the United States, provided her accommodation, coached her in media appearances and helped secure interviews with conservative television hosts including Tucker Carlson. Yan later said that the COVID-19 virus was artificially made, however her interview was rejected on social media as misinformation and her research rejected by scientists who said it was "based on conjecture" though filled with jargon.

On January 20, 2021, the Chinese government imposed sanctions against Bannon and 27 other Trump administration officials that "planned, promoted and executed a series of crazy moves, gravely interfered in China's internal affairs, undermined China's interests, offended the Chinese people, and seriously disrupted China-U.S. relations". The sanctions ban them from entering China, including Hong Kong and Macau, and restrict companies and institutions associated with them from doing business in China.

=== Treatment of colleagues ===
In an interview with Frontline, former writer for Breitbart News Ben Shapiro said that he tried to avoid interacting with Bannon due to a fear of being on his bad side. Shapiro also recalled Bannon yelling and cursing at people at Breitbart News. Some who worked with Bannon described him as "egomaniacal" and "purely Machiavellian". Other former staffers at Breitbart who spoke to Politico said that Bannon would degrade employees by mocking their intelligence and would imply they were "expendable, low-life creatures". Several employees who left Breitbart alleged that when they attempted to find employment outside of Breitbart, Bannon attempted to sabotage them. However, other employees praised Bannon's leadership describing him as a generous, loyal, caring, and supportive. Many described Bannon as someone who would pay out of his own pocket for personal expenses.

In his memoir, White House senior adviser Jared Kushner recalled having an abrasive relationship with Bannon and two occasions in which Bannon threatened him, including one in which he threatened to 'break Kushner in half' after he accused Bannon of leaking to the press. Also in his memoir Kushner writes "Bannon single-handedly caused more problems for me than anyone else in my time in Washington. He probably leaked and lied about me more than everyone else combined. He played dirty and dragged me into the mud of the Russia investigation".

He only paid part of the $850,000 legal bill charged by Davidoff, Hutcher & Citron LLP, who represented him in the case for contempt of Congress for his defiance of the January 6 committee subpoena and in the case for the "We Build the Wall" fraud scheme. The law firm sued Bannon, and in July 2023, he was ordered to pay the remaining balance.

=== Connection to Jeffrey Epstein ===
According to Michael Wolff, Bannon was introduced to Jeffrey Epstein in 2017 and Epstein introduced Bannon to some of his friends. Bannon also worked with Ehud Barak and attorney Reid Weingarten to attempt to reform Epstein's public image. Later reports showed Bannon reportedly prepped Epstein for an interview with 60 Minutes that ultimately never occurred. Bannon confirmed that he did tape 15 hours of interviews with Epstein but denied that he was coaching him for further interviews and that the footage was for an unannounced documentary on Epstein. While Netflix documentary Jeffrey Epstein: Filthy Rich was under production, Bannon proposed a documentary, to be funded by Epstein, that would counter the claims made by Netflix and defend Epstein. Bannon proposed filming on Little Saint James, Epstein's private island which he had used as a base for underage sex trafficking. Epstein additionally made travel arrangements for Bannon, reserving a charter jet to fly Bannon to the United Kingdom to speak at the Oxford Union.

In December 2025, the House Oversight Committee released email and text messages between Bannon and Epstein. The two had discussed in 2019 using a Kovel agreement, a legal maneuver, to extend attorney-client privilege to Bannon, allowing him to join Epstein's legal team, despite Bannon not being a lawyer. The proposed agreement would allow Bannon to withhold documentary footage of Epstein he had produced. Bannon and Epstein further discussed a potential project to improve Epstein's reputation following the publication of a 2018 Miami Herald article investigating Epstein's sexual trafficking of minors. The proposed project would focus on publicizing positive aspects about Epstein's personal life. Epstein said that the goal of the project was "to humanize the monster." Bannon described negative media coverage of Epstein as a "sophisticated op". Photographs were also released of Bannon socializing with Epstein. Bannon privately described public scrutiny of Epstein as a "crazed jihad" and advised Epstein on how to avoid legal repercussions for his crimes.

In 2026, documents were released that included thousands of text messages between Bannon and Epstein, particularly from 2018 and 2019. The messages showed the two discussing efforts to influence international geopolitics, including shaping European coalitions, increasing pressure on China, and forging business ties in the Middle East. Epstein offered Bannon the use of a Paris apartment, a Palm Beach house, and his plane on multiple occasions; the two dined together frequently. Bannon provided media training to Epstein as part of work on a documentary and coached him as he faced increasing media scrutiny in early 2019. Bannon did not immediately respond to requests for comment. Bannon sought support from Epstein in his effort to build a global right-wing populist movement. Bannon discussed with Epstein his plans to remove Pope Francis as leader of the Catholic Church because of Francis' perceived opposition to nationalist political parties. Epstein additionally introduced Bannon to Noam Chomsky.

=== Criminal prosecutions ===
==== Dismissed 1996 domestic violence charges ====
Bannon was charged with misdemeanor domestic violence, battery, and dissuading a witness in early January 1996 after his then-wife, Mary Piccard, accused Bannon of domestic abuse. The Santa Monica Police Department crime report states that after Piccard called 911, an officer arrived at their home and observed red marks on Piccard's wrist and neck. The charges were later dropped when Piccard did not appear in court. In her divorce filing, Piccard stated her absence was due to threats made against her by Bannon and his lawyer: Bannon, she said, told her, "if I went to court, he and his attorney would make sure that I would be the one who was guilty." She said that Bannon's lawyer also threatened her, telling her that if Mr. Bannon went to jail, she "would have no money and no way to support the children". Bannon's lawyer denied pressuring Piccard not to testify.

==== Charges related to We Build the Wall campaign ====
===== 2020 federal fraud and money laundering indictment =====
On August 20, 2020, a federal grand jury indictment was unsealed against Bannon and three others, charging them with conspiracy to commit wire fraud and money laundering. Each charge has a maximum penalty of 20 years in prison upon conviction. Federal prosecutors of the U.S. Attorney's Office for the Southern District of New York allege that Bannon, United States Air Force veteran Brian Kolfage and the two other defendants used funds received from the We Build the Wall fundraising campaign, marketed to support the building of a border wall between the U.S. and Mexico, in a way which was "inconsistent" with how they were advertised for use to the public. According to the indictment, donations were collected through a GoFundMe campaign that was launched in December 2018. Bannon promoted the project until the day before the indictment, saying "You've been the leader of this, assisting President Trump in building this wall in these tough areas" in his War Room: Pandemic podcast.

Federal prosecutors allege that Bannon and the three other men conspired to use a non-profit group run by Bannon, and a shell company controlled by one of the other defendants, to make payments to themselves, despite promises to donors that their contributions would go to build a wall. Prosecutors also alleged that Bannon received more than $1 million in connection with the plan, some of which was paid to Kolfage in secret and some of which Bannon and two other defendants allegedly used for personal expenses ranging from paying off credit cards to personal travel. Prosecutors stated that they plan to seize the assets of Bannon's non-profit Citizens of the American Republic, as well as other organizations "politically aligned with [Donald] Trump".

Bannon was arrested by U.S. postal inspectors on Long Island Sound, off the coast of Connecticut, on board People's Republic of China expatriate Guo Wengui's luxury yacht. Later that day, Bannon pleaded not guilty to the charges. Bannon was released pending trial on a $5 million bond, of which Bannon was required to put up $1.7 million. He was required to surrender his passport and his domestic travel was restricted. Following the indictment, Donald Trump and his son, Donald Trump Jr. distanced themselves from Bannon. Trump Jr. had originally been supportive of Bannon's fundraising efforts for the Mexico–United States border wall.

At a preliminary hearing on August 31, U.S. district judge Analisa Torres set a trial date for May 24, 2021. Prosecutors revealed that they had collected a large number of emails found on various devices and online storage accounts after search warrants were executed—some earlier in the year.

In February 2025, Bannon pleaded guilty to one state felony count of a scheme to defraud in the first degree and was sentenced to a three-year conditional discharge, without any prison time or restitution.

==== Pardon by Trump ====
Trump pardon for Steve Bannon, and 27 other individuals, on January 19, 2021, the last full day of Trump's term of office

Shortly before midnight on Tuesday, January 19, the final full day of Trump's first presidency, Trump issued a series of pardons to 144 individuals, including Bannon. The White House released the list of pardoned individuals at 12:50am on January 20, Trump's final day in office.

In May 2021, Judge Torres, following the precedent of criminal cases being dismissed following presidential pardons, dismissed the fraud case against Bannon. Torres said that because the pardon was valid, dismissal of the indictment was "the proper course". In her ruling, Torres stated that despite Bannon not pleading guilty, "the issuance of a pardon may carry an imputation of guilt; acceptance a confession of it." She further quoted from an 1833 judicial discussion: "If there be no guilt, there is no ground for forgiveness."

==== 2022 New York state indictment ====
Federal pardons only cover federal offenses, so Trump's pardon of Bannon did not preclude state charges against him. By February 2021, the Manhattan district attorney had issued subpoenas to Wells Fargo Bank and GoFundMe, which had provided accounts for the venture. In August 2022, Bannon was indicted on New York state charges of money laundering, conspiracy and fraud related to the $25 million "We Build the Wall" scheme. Bannon said the charges were politically motivated, and—invoking a common right-wing conspiracy theory—linked somehow to financier George Soros. Bannon said that he and Trump would not "stop fighting" and "they will have to kill me first".

He surrendered to authorities on September 8, 2022. The trial was originally expected to start May 27, 2024, however it was postponed to September 23, 2024, because the judge in that case, Juan Merchan, was also overseeing the Trump "hush-money" case and was unavailable at that time. Due to an ongoing conflict, Bannon's case was reassigned to Judge April Newbauer who later rescheduled it for December 9, 2024. At Bannon's request, Newbauer again rescheduled it for February 25, 2025. On February 11, 2025, Bannon "pleaded guilty to one state felony count of a scheme to defraud in the first degree and was sentenced to a three-year conditional discharge."

==== 2022 contempt of Congress conviction and prison stay ====
On September 23, 2021, the U.S. House Select Committee on the January 6 Attack subpoenaed Bannon, ordering him to appear on October 14. His lawyers gave the committee advance notice that he would not comply. After he did not appear, the House of Representatives voted to hold him in criminal contempt of Congress and to refer him to the Justice Department. This was initiated by the nine-member committee's unanimous vote on October 19, followed by the full House of Representatives which voted 229–202, with all 220 Democrats and 9 Republicans in favor of the resolution, on October 21. He was indicted by a federal grand jury on November 12, 2021, on two criminal contempt charges: one count of not providing documents, and one count of not testifying. Three days later, Bannon surrendered to the FBI. He was represented by criminal defense attorney David Schoen. He pleaded not guilty.

Bannon was released pending trial, without bail, but on conditions, including keeping authorities informed of his whereabouts, and not leaving the country. An appeals court in April 2022 rejected his appeal regarding his failure to testify before the committee.

In the days leading up to his trial, Bannon offered to testify before the January 6 committee after all; U.S. district judge Carl J. Nichols, a Trump appointee, rejected Bannon's offer as a "last-ditch attempt to avoid accountability." Bannon sought to delay his trial to October, citing negative publicity from the concurrent televised committee hearings; the court denied the motions. Bannon incorrectly asserted Trump had claimed executive privilege over his testimony and documents, and said he would call prominent Democrats such as Nancy Pelosi to testify at his trial, asserting on his podcast, "we're going medieval on these people." Nichols denied the defense motions, finding that Bannon was not entitled to raise an "advice of counsel" defense or an executive privilege defense. After the judge's ruling, Bannon's attorney Schoen asked the court, "what's the point of going to trial if there are no defenses?", to which Nichols replied, "agreed", hinting that Bannon should seek a plea deal.

The trial began on July 18, 2022, with the jury being finalized the next day. Bannon declined to call witnesses or testify in his own defense.

On July 22, 2022, the jury found Bannon guilty on both charges. Bennie Thompson and Liz Cheney, the chairman and vice chairman, respectively, of the January 6 Committee, called Bannon's conviction "a victory for the rule of law and an important affirmation of the Select Committee's work". The DOJ prosecutor said that Bannon "chose allegiance to Donald Trump over compliance with the law" and "No one is above the law"; prosecutors also said that Bannon had "thumbed his nose" at American democracy and law.

On October 21, 2022, Judge Nichols sentenced Bannon to serve four months in prison and pay a $6,500 fine. Nichols stated in issuing the sentence, "Others must be deterred from committing similar crimes." The DOJ had requested the maximum penalty (six months in jail), plus a $200,000 fine.

On November 4, 2022, Bannon appealed his conviction and sentence; he remained free pending appeal, with his sentence put on hold. In January 2023, his lawyers argued that the DOJ had improperly searched his private communications. Due to the unexpected death of a government lawyer's son, Bannon's appeal hearing was delayed from October 12 to November 9 at the request of the DOJ. Bannon did not attend the hearing; his attorney David Schoen did. On May 10, 2024, the appellate court unanimously upheld the conviction and on May 14, the DOJ filed a motion to lift Bannon's stay of sentence and have him report to prison.

June 28, 2024, Order of the Supreme Court denying Steve Bannon's request to delay his prison sentence

On June 6, 2024, Judge Carl Nichols granted the motion and ordered Bannon to report to prison by July 1 unless the full appeals court were to take the case and pause enforcement of the sentence. Because of the pending case against him in New York, he was not eligible for a minimum-security prison, and it was decided that he would instead go to Federal Correctional Institution, Danbury, a low-security prison in Connecticut. On June 26, House speaker Mike Johnson said that House Republicans would intercede on behalf of Bannon with the federal court considering his appeal, though they did not file any briefs doing so.

On June 21, Bannon made an emergency application to the U.S. Supreme Court, which denied it in a one-sentence order on June 28. He reported to the low-level security Federal Correctional Institution, Danbury in Danbury, Connecticut on July 1, 2024, where he lived in a special veterans housing unit according to his federal prison consultant Sam Mangel. He is the second Trump era official to be jailed for contempt related to defying a subpoena from the January 6 Committee, after Peter Navarro. Bannon was released from Bureau of Prisons custody on October 29, 2024.

On April 6, 2026, the U.S. Supreme Court threw out the federal appeals court ruling that had upheld Bannon's conviction.

== Social media bans ==
During the November 5, 2020, edition of his webcast, Bannon called for the beheadings of Anthony Fauci, the government's top infectious diseases expert, and FBI director Christopher Wray. Bannon said that if it were up to him, after beheading Fauci and Wray, "I'd put the heads on pikes" and display them outside the White House "as a warning to bureaucrats" who dared oppose Trump. By the end of the day, Facebook and YouTube had deleted the video from their platforms, and Twitter had permanently banned his account for glorifying violence. Mailchimp also disabled Bannon's email newsletter. The next day, Bannon was dropped by a lawyer who had been defending him against federal charges of fraud.

On January 9, 2021, Rudy Giuliani appeared on War Room, accusing Democrats of stealing the recent presidential election and blaming them for the storming of the Capitol. Hours later, YouTube removed both the podcast channel and another one called "Trump at War – A Film by Stephen K. Bannon", citing a "violation of YouTube's Terms of Service".

== Political ideology ==
Bannon has described himself as a populist and nationalist.

Lebanese-American author Nassim Nicholas Taleb, neoreactionary blogger Curtis Yarvin and conservative intellectual Michael Anton have been pointed out as three of the main influences in Steve Bannon's political thinking. Political theorist and philosopher Edmund Burke has also been described as a major influence on Bannon's ideological outlook. According to The Guardian in January 2018, Bannon's ideology is similar to that of Stephen Miller, Tucker Carlson, Benny Johnson, Raheem Kassam and Matthew Boyle, the latter two having been protégés of Bannon at Breitbart.

Despite being arrested on federal charges of conspiracy to commit mail fraud and money laundering in connection with the We Build the Wall fundraising campaign in August 2020, in an interview, Bannon told journalist Michael Lewis in February 2018, "We got elected on Drain the Swamp, Lock Her Up, Build a Wall. This was pure anger. Anger and fear is what gets people to the polls." He added, "The Democrats don't matter. The real opposition is the media. And the way to deal with them is to flood the zone with shit."

=== Individual issues ===
A self-described economic nationalist, Bannon advocates for reductions in immigration and restrictions on free trade with China and Mexico. He has been described as a white nationalist but rejects the description. He generally believes in reducing the size of the federal bureaucracy, declaring at the Conservative Political Action Conference he favored the "deconstruction of the administrative state".

In May 2025, Bannon voiced opposition to a bipartisan proposal that would expand anti-BDS laws punishing the boycott of Israel.

==== Paris climate agreement ====
Bannon was a strong opponent of the Paris climate agreement. During his time in the Trump administration, he successfully persuaded Donald Trump to withdraw from it.

==== Immigration ====
Bannon favors reducing immigration, both legal and illegal immigration, to the U.S. and asserts that immigration threatens national sovereignty. Bannon has suggested that too many Silicon Valley chief executives are Asian or South Asian, and that this undermines "civic society". In a 2015 radio appearance, Bannon expressed opposition to resettling any refugees of the Syrian Civil War in the U.S. In a 2016 radio appearance, Bannon asserted that illegal immigration was "horrific" but that legal immigration was "the beating heart of this problem"; that levels of legal immigration to the U.S. were "scary"; and that legal immigrants had "kinda overwhelmed the country". On his podcast, Bannon emphasized the need for "MAGA shock troops" to actively support Donald Trump's plans for mass deportations. He envisions these loyalists not only participating in street-level actions but also embedding within the Trump administration to ensure the comprehensive removal of undocumented immigrants.

Bannon was the chairman of We Build the Wall, an organization involved in the construction of the proposed expansion of the Mexico–United States barrier.

==== Economics ====
Bannon often describes himself as an economic nationalist, criticizing crony capitalism, Austrian economics, and the objectivist capitalism of Ayn Rand. He also generally considers himself a free-market capitalist, however in May 2025 Steve Bannon described his team as being Neo-Brandeisians and advocated in favor of Lina Khan's administration of the FTC. He is also considered to be a market fundamentalist. Bannon favors raising federal income taxes to 44 percent for those earning incomes over $5 million a year as a way to pay for middle class tax cuts. He also supports significantly increasing spending on infrastructure, describing himself as "the guy pushing a trillion-dollar infrastructure plan".

In 2014, during a conference at the Vatican, Bannon criticized Wall Street for its role in the 2008 financial crisis. He has also criticized bail outs for big banks and is angered by the fact that Wall Street banks have not been held accountable for the financial crisis, which he says fueled populist fury and groups such as the Tea Party.

Bannon has praised Democratic politicians Ro Khanna, Sherrod Brown, and John Fetterman for their economically populist views, particularly regarding corporate offshoring. Khanna has, in turn, agreed with Bannon on several occasions, praising Bannon's support for increasing taxes on corporations and opposition to "unfettered globalization and automation".

==== Gun control ====
Amid ongoing national debates on gun violence and gun control, Bannon has been vocal in advocating for broader access to firearms, emphasizing the importance of the Second Amendment. He has been vocal in warning Trump against any shifts towards gun control, emphasizing the potential for intense backlash from the president's base. A notable instance of this was his reaction to the 2017 Las Vegas shooting, where Bannon insisted that any move by Trump towards gun control would be the "end of everything," suggesting that it would be received even more negatively than an immigration amnesty bill by Trump's political base. Expanding on his pro-gun stance, Bannon sparked controversy by advocating for the arming and training of children in the use of firearms. Speaking at Turning Point USA's America Fest in December 2023, he proposed that gun classes should be integrated into school curriculums as a means for children to defend themselves against bullies.

==== Foreign policy ====
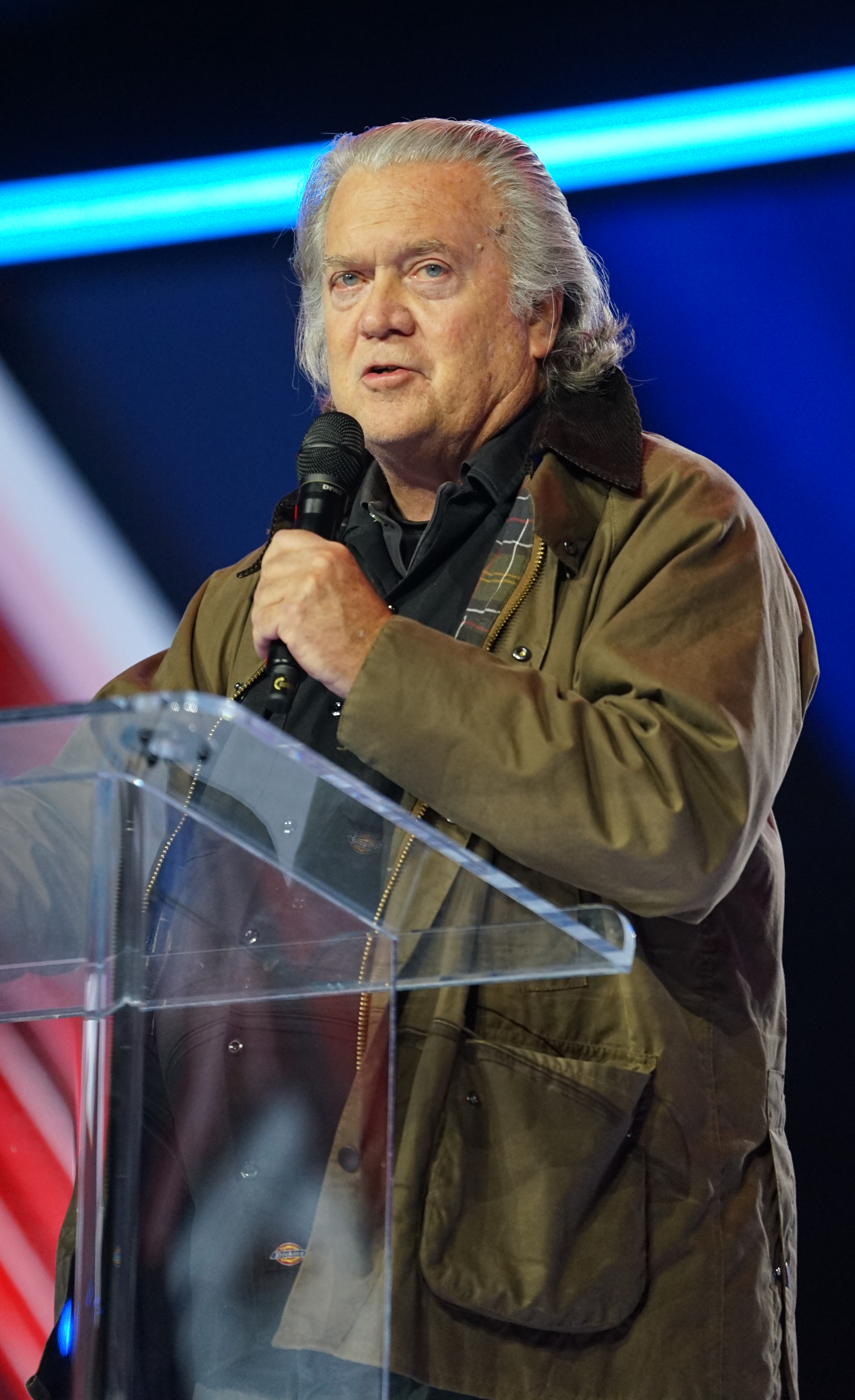
Bannon advocating "America First" policies at AmericaFest 2025

Bannon is generally skeptical of military intervention abroad, opposing proposals for the expansion of U.S. involvement in the War in Afghanistan, the Syrian Civil War, and the crisis in Venezuela.

In Afghanistan, he supported a proposal by Erik Prince for the deployment of private military contractors instead of the U.S. military. He believes "there is no military solution" to the 2017 North Korea crisis.

Bannon has described U.S. allies in Europe, the Persian Gulf, the South China Sea, the Strait of Malacca, as well as South Korea and Japan, as having become "protectorates of the United States" that do not "make an effort to defend [themselves]", and believes NATO members should pay a minimum of 2% of GDP on defense.

Bannon opposes upgrading the U.S. nuclear arsenal. Bannon strongly favors U.S. withdrawal from the Iran nuclear deal, and was supportive of the approach taken by Saudi crown prince Mohammed bin Salman during the 2017 Qatar diplomatic crisis.

During his tenure as White House chief strategist, Bannon opposed the 2017 Shayrat missile strike, but lost the internal debate on the matter to Kushner. He also expressed skepticism about the 2020 assassination of Qasem Soleimani, questioning whether it was "necessary to kill this guy and to kill him now and to exacerbate the military issues", and warned that an escalation with Iran could undermine Trump's support with "working-class, middle-class people, particularly people whose sons and daughters actually fight in these wars".

He has referred to himself as a "proud Christian Zionist" in reference to his support of Israel. Bannon reportedly spoke often with Trump donor Sheldon Adelson, and was alarmed at a push for a renewed Middle East peace process. He has described Palestinian president Mahmoud Abbas as a "terrorist". He has advocated giving the land in the West Bank to Jordan and in Gaza to Egypt. In 2025, Bannon suggested a Three-state solution, which would include a Christian state.

In June 2025, Bannon opposed the involvement of the United States in the Twelve-Day War. During a meeting with Trump prior to the American strikes on Iranian nuclear sites, Bannon suggested to Trump that Israeli intelligence could not be trusted, that bunker buster bombs may not work as planned, and that striking Iran put U.S. soldiers in the Middle East at risk. Following Israeli violations of the Twelve-Day War ceasefire, he stated that Israel is "not an ally" of the United States and described pro-Israel commentator Mark Levin as "Tel Aviv Levin". Bannon has also called for an investigation into Fox News over its coverage of the war, suggesting it was acting at the behest of Israel. Bannon later accused Israeli Prime Minister Benjamin Netanyahu of "pathological lies" in order to involve the United States in Israel's future conflicts, after Netanyahu claimed the Make America Great Again movement was incompatible with anti-Israel views.

==== China ====
Bannon believes the U.S. is not merely in a Cold War but already in a "hot war" with China, especially in the domains of information and economics. Bannon expressed concerns about China's growing influence in Asia, viewing the nation as expansionist and anticipating a global culture clash. He holds the view that the Chinese Communist Party (CCP) must be confronted and suggests that the ongoing informational and economic confrontations will escalate into a "kinetic war". Bannon believes a military confrontation between the US and China in the South China Sea is likely to occur within the next decade. He highlighted China's construction of artificial islands, equating them to stationary aircraft carriers with missiles, as a primary concern.

According to Chaos Under Heaven, a book by Josh Rogin, Bannon was the leader of a group of officials that wanted Trump to "speed the downfall" of the CCP and that "believed in economic nationalism, the return of manufacturing from abroad, and the protection of domestic industries, even at the expense of free trade". The book wrote that Bannon "believed the only way to save our country and the free world is to bring down the CCP as quickly as possible". Regarding China, Bannon said, "My belief is pretty straightforward, that the CCP is exactly like Mussolini, Hitler, and Tojo. These are gangsters, they are criminals. They think like criminals, they act like criminals and they need to be treated like criminals". Bannon frequently used the phrase "CCP delende est", paraphrasing Cato the Elder, who said "Carthago delenda est". During his tenure in the White House, Bannon allied with trade advisor Peter Navarro, who advocated for a hawkish stance against China. Bannon had read Navarro's books about China and used his influence on Trump to advance Navarro's views.

==== United Kingdom ====
Although "those who met him say" Bannon initially favored the British National Party (BNP) and the English Defence League (EDL) in the United Kingdom, he later backed the UK Independence Party (UKIP).

Bannon urged Boris Johnson, who Bannon said in July 2018 that he had known "over the last year" and was "very impressed" with, to challenge Prime Minister Theresa May. According to a BuzzFeed News report, Bannon was in private contact with Johnson during his visit to Britain that month, and the two men were previously in text communication during their respective tenures as White House chief strategist and British foreign secretary.

==== Europe ====
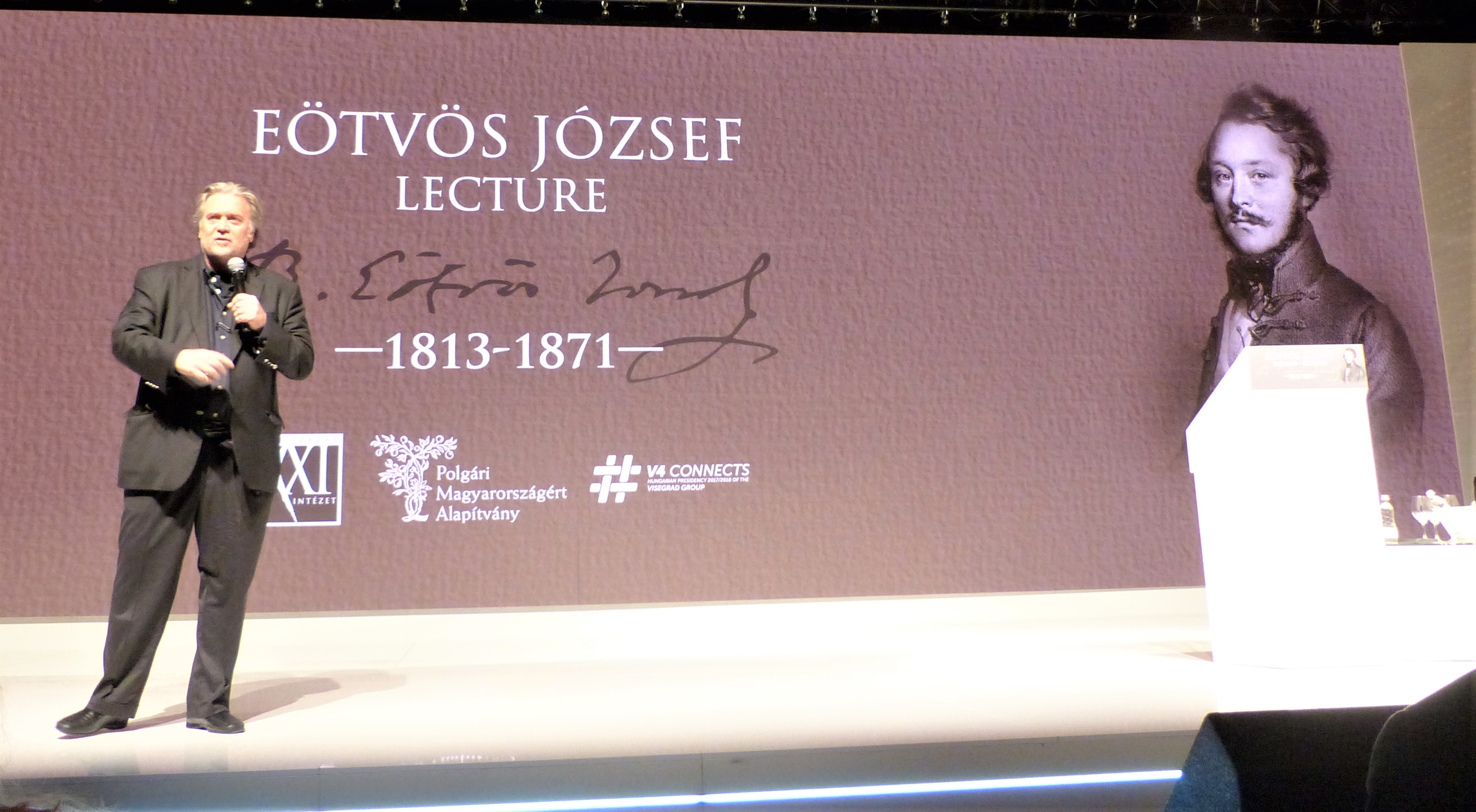
Bannon speaking on the future of Europe in Budapest in May 2018

Bannon has defended Trump's ties to and praise for Russian president Vladimir Putin. He expressed a belief that traditionalists see Russia as an ally. Bannon said they "believe that at least Putin is standing up for traditional institutions, and he's trying to do it in a form of nationalism—and I think that people, particularly in certain countries, want to see the sovereignty for their country. They want to see nationalism for their country" rather than a "pan-European Union". According to the book War for Eternity, Bannon met Russian far-right political philosopher Aleksandr Dugin in Rome in 2018 to advocate closer relations between the United States and Russia, as well as Traditionalist philosophy. Bannon supports closer ties to Russia to ally them against China.

In 2018, Bannon announced plans to launch a new political operation beginning with an attempt to unite populist parties across Europe before the 2019 European Parliament election. With the project to be based in Brussels, he indicated he would spend 50 percent of his time in Europe from the following November, working at locations throughout the continent. Later that year, Bannon formed a foundation called The Movement to connect far-right groups throughout Europe.

Bannon is supportive of European right-wing populist national conservative movements such as the Hungarian Fidesz, the French National Front (now National Rally), the Spanish Vox, the Dutch Party for Freedom, Alternative for Germany, the Italian Northern League, the Freedom Party of Austria, the Sweden Democrats, the Danish People's Party, the Flemish Vlaams Belang and the New Flemish Alliance, the Polish Law and Justice, and the Swiss People's Party.

==== Islam ====
In 2007, Bannon proposed and developed a script for a documentary titled Destroying the Great Satan: The Rise of Islamic Fascism in America. The film's plot was that there was an effort by Muslims to take over America.

In 2010, Bannon said, "Islam is not a religion of peace. Islam is a religion of submission". He also criticized George W. Bush for calling Islam a religion of peace. Bannon has said that Islam today is "something much darker" than Adolf Hitler and the Nazis. He has also stated, "If you're Sharia-compliant ... we don't want you here," and has accused U.S. newspapers of being "Sharia-compliant". He has also stated, "The elites in Europe ... are allowing an Islamic invasion to take place." and that the war with Islamic fascism is "metastasizing far quicker than governments can handle it."

In his talk delivered to a small conference in the Vatican during 2014, Bannon said: "If you look back at the long history of the Judeo-Christian West [sic] struggle against Islam, I believe that our forefathers kept their stance, and I think they did the right thing. I think they kept it out of the world, whether it was at Vienna, or Tours, or other places...it bequeathed to us the great institution that is the church of the West". He is reputed to believe Putin's Russia and Trump's America are Christian allies against the Islamic State and "radical Islamic terrorism". During his time in the Trump administration, Bannon and Stephen Miller helped orchestrate Executive Order 13769 which banned entrance into United States from seven majority Muslim countries. Bannon has been linked to the counter-jihad movement.

==== Transhumanism and new technologies ====
Bannon sees transhumanism as a dangerous and radical religion of "the technocratic elite". He accuses tech entrepreneurs of using "transhumanistic science" to control humanity and eradicate religion through advanced gene editing, robotics, and forced microscopic implants. He has accused transhumanists of wanting eternal life at the expense of disregarding people's religious beliefs. Bannon's recent preoccupation with transhumanism aligns with his anti-vaccine rhetoric, and he has adopted similar positions as Alex Jones on this topic. In discussions with his frequent podcast contributor Joe Allen, he also promotes viewpoints against AI and other new technologies inspired by "The Unabomber" Ted Kaczynski. On his podcast, Bannon said he was proud to be a Luddite and expressed concern that Homo sapiens could be replaced in the near future.

=== Overview and influences ===
Bannon's ideology was the subject of the book War for Eternity by Benjamin R. Teitelbaum, where his thinking is described as combining elements of a radical version of traditionalism with paleoconservatism and other more standard American conservative beliefs. Bannon's political and economic views have been described by others as nationalist, and right-wing populist. He self-identifies as a conservative. He rejects allegations that he is a white nationalist.

At a party congress in March 2018, Bannon gave members of the French right-wing populist National Front (NF) what has been described as a "populist pep talk". He advised party members to "Let them call you racist, let them call you xenophobes, let them call you nativists. Wear it like a badge of honor. Because every day, we get stronger and they get weaker...History is on our side and will bring us victory." Bannon's remarks brought the members to their feet. Critics expressed concern that Bannon was "normalizing racism".

Bannon was influenced by Fourth Turning theory, outlined in Neil Howe's and William Strauss's The Fourth Turning: An American Prophecy, one of Bannon's favorite books. The theory proposes, "populism, nationalism and state-run authoritarianism would soon be on the rise, not just in America but around the world. [...Once one strips] away the extraneous accidents and technology, you are left with only a limited number of social moods, which tend to recur in a fixed order", and cyclically. The book was major influence on Bannon's film Generation Zero.

According to Bannon's former friends, he was particularly influenced by the Hindu scripture Bhagavad Gita and the ancient Chinese military treatise The Art of War. Bannon has also cited the Russian neo-fascist Alexander Dugin, who promotes a Russian nationalist variant of traditionalism called Eurasianism, and described himself as a fan of Dugin's book, The Fourth Political Theory. However, Bannon has urged Dugin to abandon his anti-American and Sinophile views. Bannon has also described Brazilian traditionalist thinker Olavo de Carvalho as "one of the great conservative intellectuals in the world".

==== Paleoconservatism and alleged Nazi positions ====
Bannon is an admirer of paleoconservative commentator Pat Buchanan. Bannon's favorite columnist is academic Walter Russell Mead. In a 2014 speech to a Vatican conference, Bannon made a passing reference to Julius Evola, a twentieth-century, Nazi-linked Italian writer who influenced Benito Mussolini's Italian Fascism and promoted the Traditionalist School, described by a New York Times writer as "a worldview popular in far-right and alternative religious circles that believes progress and equality are poisonous illusions." Bannon's interest in the ideas of the Traditionalist School was driven by Evola's book Revolt Against the Modern World, and Guénon's books Man and His Becoming According to the Vedanta and The Crisis of the Modern World. In March 2016, Bannon stated he appreciates "any piece that mentions Evola". In referring to the associated views of Vladimir Putin, who is influenced by Evola follower Dugin, Bannon stated "We, the Judeo-Christian West, really have to look at what he's talking about as far as Traditionalism goes — particularly the sense of where it supports the underpinnings of nationalism." He has likewise quoted French anti-Enlightenment writer Charles Maurras approvingly to a French diplomat. Bannon has also repeatedly referenced the controversial French novel The Camp of the Saints (1973) by Jean Raspail, which depicts Third World immigration destroying Western civilization. He has embraced what BBC News describes as Savitri Devi's "account of history as a cyclical battle between good and evil". Bannon told an interviewer in 2018 that he is "fascinated by Mussolini", noting: "He was clearly loved by women. He was a guy's guy. He has all that virility. He also had amazing fashion sense, right, that whole thing with the uniforms." A former Breitbart writer wrote that Bannon said in 2015 that alt-right publication American Renaissance was "fighting the same fight" as him. Bannon has expressed admiration for German Conservative Revolutionary philosopher Martin Heidegger, praising his "ideas on the subject of being".

German film director Leni Riefenstahl, who produced propaganda films for the regime in Nazi Germany, is said to have influenced Bannon's film-making techniques, with Bannon once describing himself to writing colleague Julia Jones as the "Riefenstahl of George Bush", modifying the ending as "the GOP" when Jones was horrified. The opening of Bannon's documentary film The Hope & The Change (2012) consciously imitated Riefenstahl's film The Triumph of the Will (1935), which depicted the Nuremberg Rally held in 1934.

He has expressed interest in Henri Bergson's concept of élan vital and Joseph Schumpeter's creative destruction. Additionally, he said that his initial inspiration to get into traditionalist philosophy was his reading of George Gurdjieff, when Dugin asked him to explain this during a meeting they had together in Rome.

Speaking at a Conservative Political Action Conference meeting in February 2025, Bannon closed his pro-Trump remarks with what appeared to some as a Nazi salute. The incident came one month after Elon Musk made a similar salute during a Trump inaugural appearance. French far-right political party National Rally president Jordan Bardella canceled his scheduled speech to CPAC, saying Bannon's gesture was "referring to Nazi ideology". Bannon denied that it was a Nazi salute, writing that he had "waved to the MAGA movement".

== Personal life ==
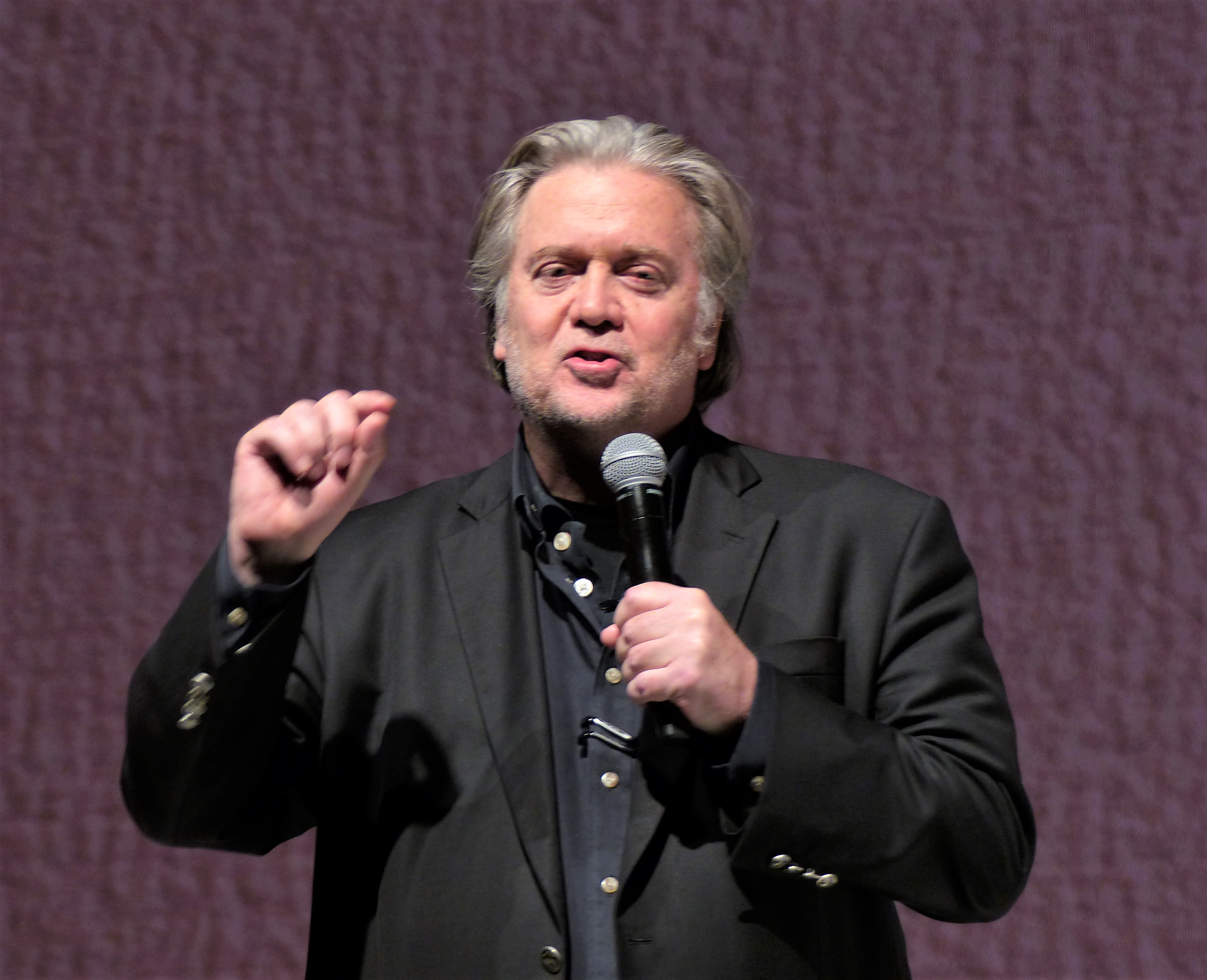
Bannon in 2018

Bannon has been married and divorced three times. He has three adult daughters. His first marriage was to Cathleen Suzanne Houff. Bannon and Houff had a daughter, Maureen, in 1988 and subsequently divorced.

Bannon's second marriage was to Mary Louise Piccard, a former investment banker, whom he married in April 1995. Their twin daughters were born three days after the wedding. Piccard filed for dissolution of their marriage in 1997.

During their divorce proceedings, Piccard alleged that Bannon had made antisemitic remarks about her choice of schools, saying he did not want to send his children to the Archer School for Girls because there were too many Jews at the school, and Jews raise their children to be "whiny brats". Bannon's spokesperson denied the accusation, noting that he had chosen to send both his children to the Archer School.

Bannon's third marriage was to model Diane Clohesy; they married in 2006 and divorced in 2009.

His brother, Chris Bannon, is a TV producer.

Bannon is a self-described Traditionalist Catholic.

== Filmography ==
Bannon has been a producer, writer, director or actor on the following films and documentaries:

Year	Title	Credited as	Notes
1991	The Indian Runner	executive producer	
1999	Titus	co-executive producer	based on the Shakespearean tragedy Titus Andronicus and starring Anthony Hopkins and Jessica Lange
2004	In the Face of Evil: Reagan's War in Word and Deed	director, co-producer, writer	based on the 2002 book Reagan's War by Peter Schweizer
2005	Cochise County USA: Cries from the Border	executive producer	
2006	Border War: The Battle Over Illegal Immigration	executive producer	
2007	Tradition Never Graduates: A Season Inside Notre Dame Football	executive producer	
2010	Generation Zero	director, producer, writer	based on the 1997 book The Fourth Turning by William Strauss and Neil Howe
2010	Battle for America	director, producer, writer	
2010	Fire from the Heartland: The Awakening of the Conservative Woman	director, producer, writer	
2011	Still Point in a Turning World: Ronald Reagan and His Ranch	director, writer	
2011	The Undefeated	director, producer, writer	documentary on Sarah Palin
2012	Occupy Unmasked	director, writer	
2012	The Hope & The Change	director, producer, writer	documentary on former Barack Obama supporters
2012	District of Corruption	director, producer	
2013	Sweetwater	executive producer	
2016	Clinton Cash	producer, writer	based on the same-titled Peter Schweizer book Clinton Cash
2016	Torchbearer	director, producer, writer	features Duck Dynasty patriarch Phil Robertson
2018	Trump @War	director, writer	Starring Corey Lewandowski, Pete Hegseth, Sebastian Gorka, Raheem Kassam, Sonnie Johnson, Raynard Jackson, Alfredo Ortiz, Sasha Gong, Erik Prince, Joe Concha, Lian Chao Han, Bill Gertz, Michael Caputo, Rob Wasinger, John Zmirak
2019	American Dharma	actor	
2019	Claws of the Red Dragon	executive producer	
2019	The Brink	actor	

== See also ==
- Mueller Report – 2019 U.S. government report on Russian interference in the 2016 election
- Russian interference in the 2016 Brexit referendum – Alleged foreign meddling campaign
- Russian interference in the 2016 United States elections
- Timeline of Russian interference in the 2016 United States elections
- Unhumans – Book by Jack Posobiec and Joshua Lisec

== Notes ==
Political offices
Vacant Title last held by John Podesta as Counselor to the President	Senior Counselor to the President; 2017; Served alongside: Kellyanne Conway, Dina Powell	Succeeded by Kellyanne Conway; Dina Powell
New office	White House Chief Strategist; 2017	Vacant
