= Deneen Borelli =

American journalist (born 1964)

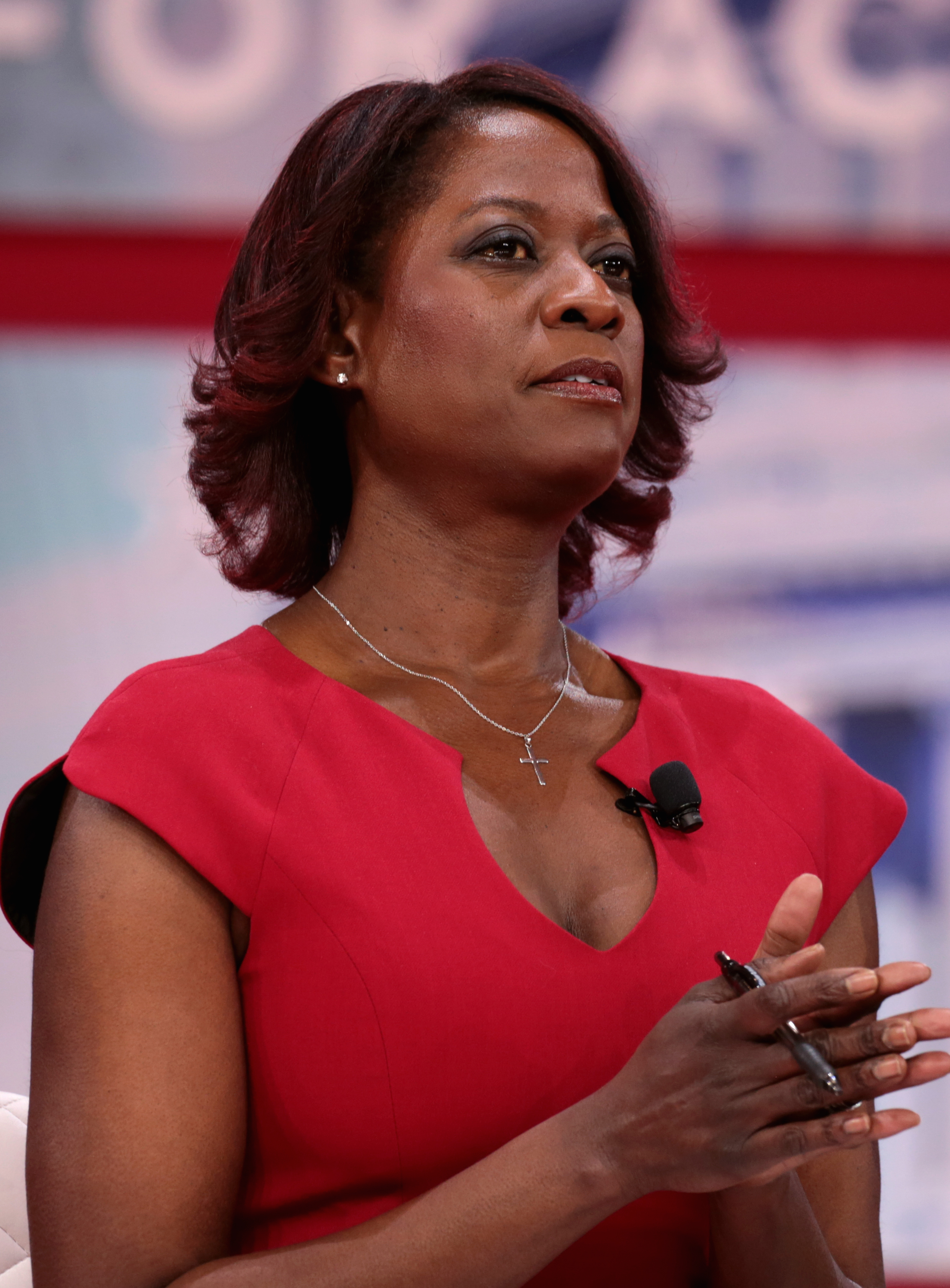
- Borelli in 2018
- Born: Deneen Laverne Moore; May 28, 1964 (age 62); Burlington, New Jersey, U.S.
- Education: Pace University (BA)
- Occupations: Author, television personality, columnist
- Spouse: Tom Borelli
- Website: deneenborelli.com

Deneen Laverne Borelli (née Moore; born May 28, 1964) is an American conservative author, radio and television personality, and columnist.

== Career ==
Borelli worked at Philip Morris for twenty years. She is the author of Blacklash: How Obama and the Left are Driving Americans to the Government Plantation, a 2012 political book on what she describes as progressivism, crony capitalism, and elitism under the Obama administration.

Borelli was a host on BlazeTV; has spoken at Tea Party rallies; was the Outreach Director for Tea Party group FreedomWorks overseeing its Empower.org outreach program; and a Manager of Media Relations with the Congress of Racial Equality (CORE). Borelli was also a Senior Fellow with Project 21, a network of black conservatives organized by the National Center for Public Policy Research.

Borelli is a contributor on Newsmax. She was previously a contributor on Fox News and Fox Business and has appeared on programs such as Hannity, Fox & Friends, Your World with Neil Cavuto, America's Newsroom, Making Money with Charles Payne, Trish Regan Primetime, and Lou Dobbs Tonight.

Borelli is a guest host with SiriusXM Patriot satellite radio and fills in for national broadcast radio shows including The Sean Hannity Show, The David Webb Show, and The Wilkow Majority.

== Personal life ==
She is married to Tom Borelli and is Catholic.

== See also ==
- Black conservatism in the United States
