= David E. Kaiser =

American historian (born 1947)

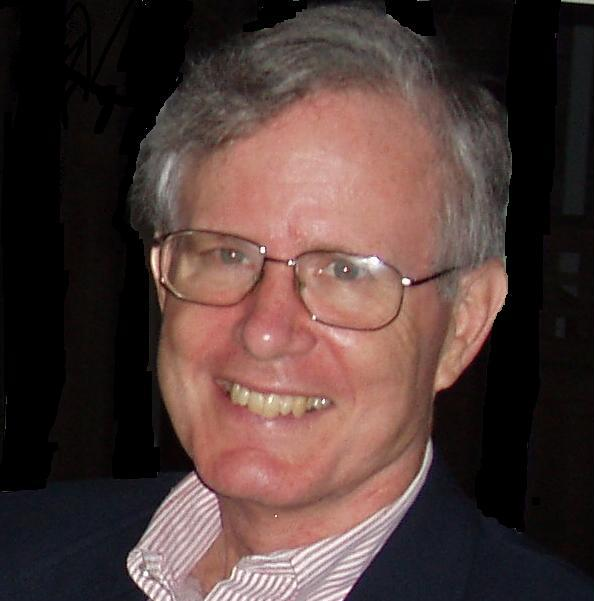
- David Kaiser
- Born: June 7, 1947 (age 79)
- Education: Harvard University
- Website: historyunfolding.blogspot.com

David E. Kaiser (born June 7, 1947) is an American historian whose published works have covered a broad range of topics, from European warfare to American League baseball. He was a professor in the Strategy and Policy Department of the United States Naval War College from 1990 until 2012 and has taught at Carnegie Mellon, Williams College, and Harvard University.

== Early life ==
The son of a diplomat, Kaiser spent his childhood in three capital cities: Washington D.C., Albany, New York, and Dakar, Senegal. He attended Harvard University, graduating with a B.A. in history in 1969. He then spent several years at Harvard University where he gained a PhD in history, in 1976. He served in the Army Reserve from 1970 to 1976.

== Published works ==
His works include: Economic Diplomacy and the Origins of the Second World War, Postmortem: New Evidence in the Case of Sacco and Vanzetti (with William Young), Politics and War: European Conflict from Philip II to Hitler, and Epic Season: The 1948 American League Pennant Race. His book, American Tragedy: Kennedy, Johnson, and the Origins of the Vietnam War, was winner of the 2001 ForeWord Magazine Book of the Year Award (History Category). The Road to Dallas, (2008) examined the evidence in the Kennedy Assassination. In December 2008 he published a collection of his blog entries History Unfolding : Crisis and Rebirth in American Life 2004-2008. No End Save Victory (2014) described Franklin Roosevelt's leadership and the growing involvement of the United States in the Second World War in 1940–1. Baseball Greatness: Top Players and Teams According to Wins Above Average, 1901-2017(2018) analyzed the contributions of individual players to winning teams over the whole history of major league baseball, and developed a new, simple way to identify the greatest players. A Life in History (2018) combines an account of Kaiser's own life and career with a commentary on changes in academia over the last half century and their broader effects.

=== The Road to Dallas ===
The Road to Dallas, about the Kennedy assassination, was published by Harvard University Press in 2008. The book accepts the Warren Commission's finding that Lee Harvey Oswald was the lone gunman, but posits that he was an opponent of Castro used by mafia leaders who wanted Kennedy and Castro dead. Publishers Weekly's review stated: "While plenty of authors have argued that the Mafia and anti-Castro Cubans were behind the assassination of President Kennedy, few have done so as convincingly as... Kaiser." Kirkus Reviews said that "the narrative’s level of detail, sober style, strict adherence to its double-track theory and plausible argument make it worthy of consideration."

Timothy Naftali review for The Washington Post stated that he did not find Kaiser's arguments to be plausible or persuasive and described The Road to Dallas as "manic and unreadable".

=== No End Save Victory ===
No End Save Victory: How FDR Led the Nation into War was published by Basic Books in 2014. In the book, Kaiser argued that Franklin D. Roosevelt did not lead the United States into World War II prior to 1941 because the country did not have the arms to do so. In a review for The Washington Post, H. W. Brands wrote: "David Kaiser focuses on the critical months between May 1940 and December 1941. Others have written about this period, but few with his precision and insight." Michael Beschloss of The New York Times described the book as "David Kaiser’s judicious, detailed and soundly researched history of Roosevelt’s tortuous process of first preparing America psychologically, politically and militarily, and then nudging the country into that apocalyptic struggle." Beschloss added, "Kaiser has brought us a careful, nuanced, credible account of the events and complex issues surrounding America’s entry into World War II, which, however historical fashions change, is likely to wear well over the years."

Writing for The Wall Street Journal, Alonzo L. Hamby stated: "Mr. Kaiser's important story of internal discussion makes a substantial contribution to knowledge." Hamby also wrote: "What gets largely passed over in his account is the high public drama of the period—the intense interventionist-isolationist debate (including the rhetorical duel between Roosevelt and Charles A. Lindbergh); the crucial commitment-laden visits to Britain and the Soviet Union by the president's close adviser Harry Hopkins; and FDR's unprecedented campaign for a third term in 1940." Kirkus Reviews described No End Save Victory as "[a]n admiring, richly textured portrait of a leader confronting the unthinkable." It also characterized Kaiser as "an unabashed fan of FDR in this detailed description and analysis of U.S. foreign policy from May 1940 to Pearl Harbor. Repeatedly, he pauses to praise the president."

=== A Life in History ===
Kaiser's autobiography, A Life in History, became available at MountGreylockBooks.com late in 2018. The book tells the story of his own education, teaching, authorship and academic career, while simultaneously commenting on changes in academia in general and the historical profession in particular over the last half century. Prof. Anne Rose of Penn State University describes it as "a probing, sometimes searing look at the professional life of an intellectual during the past half century" and "a personal answer to how to sustain the life of the mind and to ensure a public presence for bold thinking." Morley Winograd of the University of Southern California's Annenberg School writes that the book "captures a rare quality these days--the ability to stand for what you believe and base those beliefs on facts, not trendy opinions."

== Authored works ==
=== Books ===
- Economic Diplomacy and the Origins of the Second World War. Princeton University Press. 1980.
- (with William Young) Postmortem: New Evidence in the Case of Sacco and Vanzetti. University of Massachusetts Press. 1985. ISBN 978-0870234798.
- Epic Season: The 1948 American League Pennant Race. University of Massachusetts Press. 1998. ISBN 978-1558491465.
- American Tragedy: Kennedy, Johnson, and the Origins of the Vietnam War. Belknap Press of Harvard University Press. 2000. ISBN 978-0674006720.
- The Road to Dallas: The Assassination of John F. Kennedy. Belknap Press of Harvard University Press. 2008. ISBN 978-0674027664.
- No End Save Victory: How FDR Led the Nation into War. Basic Books. 2015. ISBN 978-0465052981.
- A Life in History. Mount Greylock Books. 2019. ISBN 978-1732874503.

=== Papers ===
- "Germany and the Origins of the First World War". The Journal of Modern History. 55 (3): 442–474. September 1983.
